= 2008–09 Sheffield Wednesday F.C. season =

English football club season

Sheffield Wednesday
2008–09 season
- Chairman: Lee Strafford
- Manager: Brian Laws
- Football League Championship: 12th
- FA Cup: Third round
- League Cup: First round
- Top goalscorer: League: Marcus Tudgay (14); All: Marcus Tudgay (14)
- Highest home attendance: 30,444 (vs. Sheffield United, 19 October)
- Lowest home attendance: 14,792 (vs. Queens Park Rangers, 9 December)
- Average home league attendance: 21,542
Home colours	Away colours

The 2008–09 season was Sheffield Wednesday Football Club's 107th competitive season, their 4th consecutive season in the Championship, and their 151st year in existence as a football club.

== Season summary ==
Sheffield Wednesday achieved their first league double over city rivals Sheffield United in 95 years, but that was the highlight of a mediocre season for the Owls. Still, a final 12th-placed finish was an improvement from the relegation struggle of the previous season.

== Kit ==
Italian manufacturers Lotto remained kit manufacturers for the season, as did Sheffield-based internet service provider Plusnet for the kit sponsorship. A new kit was introduced for the season.

== Key dates ==
- 1 July 2008: Sheffield Wednesday signs James O'Connor on a free transfer from Burnley.
- 12 August 2008: Sheffield Wednesday lost 5–3 to Rotherham United on penalties, after drawing 2–2 in the first round of Football League Cup.
- 16 September 2008: Sheffield Wednesday lost 6–0 away to Reading, their worst loss of the season.
- 19 October 2008: Sheffield Wednesday defeated Sheffield United 1–0 in the Steel City derby.
- 3 January 2009: Sheffield Wednesday lost 2–1 to Fulham in the third round of FA Cup.
- 31 January 2009: Sheffield Wednesday signs Lewis Buxton from Stoke City for a fee of £87,000.
- 2 February 2009: Sheffield Wednesday signs Michael Gray from Wolverhampton Wanderers on a free transfer.
- 7 February 2009: Sheffield Wednesday defeated Sheffield United 2–1 at Bramall Lane, their first derby double in 95 years and first competitive win at Bramall Lane in 41 years.

== Squads ==
=== First team squad ===
As per end of the season.

No.	Name	Nationality	Position (s)	Date of Birth (Age)	Signed from
Goalkeepers
1	Lee Grant	(England)	GK	27 January 1983 (aged 26)	(England) Derby County
22	Richard O'Donnell	(England)	GK	12 September 1988 (aged 20)	(England) Sheffield Wednesday Academy
27	Arron Jameson	(England)	GK	7 November 1989 (aged 19)	(England) Sheffield Wednesday Academy
Defenders
2	Tommy Spurr	(England)	LB	30 September 1987 (aged 21)	(England) Sheffield Wednesday Academy
3	Peter Gilbert (Note: Gilbert was born in Newcastle upon Tyne, England, but also qualified to represent Wales internationally and represented them at U-21 level.)	(Wales)	LB	31 July 1983 (aged 25)	(England) Leicester City
5	Richard Hinds	(England)	CB	22 August 1980 (aged 28)	(England) Scunthorpe United
6	Steve Watson	(England)	RB	1 April 1974 (aged 35)	(England) West Bromwich Albion
15	Mark Beevers	(England)	CB	12 November 1989 (aged 19)	(England) Sheffield Wednesday Academy
16	Richard Wood	(England)	CB	5 July 1985 (aged 23)	(England) Sheffield Wednesday Academy
19	Michael Gray	(England)	LB	3 August 1974 (aged 34)	(England) Wolverhampton Wanderers
20	Frank Simek	(United States)	RB	13 October 1984 (aged 24)	(England) Arsenal
21	Lewis Buxton	(England)	RB	10 December 1983 (aged 25)	(England) Stoke City
Midfielders
4	Kenny Lunt	(Republic of Ireland)	CM	20 November 1979 (aged 29)	(England) Crewe Alexandra
8	Sean McAllister	(England)	CM	15 August 1987 (aged 21)	(England) Sheffield Wednesday Academy
10	Darren Potter (Note: Potter was born in Liverpool, England, but also qualified to represent the Republic of Ireland internationally and represented them at youth level before making his international debut for the Republic of Ireland in May 2007.)	(Republic of Ireland)	CM	21 December 1984 (aged 24)	(England) Wolverhampton Wanderers
11	Etiënne Esajas	(Netherlands)	LW	4 November 1984 (aged 24)	(Netherlands) Vitesse
12	Rocky Lekaj (Note: Lekaj was born in Peć, Yugoslavia (now Kosovo), but was raised in Norway and represented them at U-18 and U-19 level.)	(Norway)	RW	12 October 1989 (aged 19)	(England) Sheffield Wednesday Academy
17	James O'Connor	(Republic of Ireland)	CM	1 September 1979 (aged 29)	(England) Burnley
23	Jermaine Johnson	(Jamaica)	RW	25 June 1980 (aged 28)	(England) Bradford City
Forwards
7	Marcus Tudgay	(England)	CF	3 February 1983 (aged 26)	(England) Derby County
9	Francis Jeffers	(England)	CF	25 January 1981 (aged 28)	(England) Blackburn Rovers
14	Luke Varney	(England)	CF	28 September 1982 (aged 26)	(England) Derby County
18	Leon Clarke	(England)	CF	10 February 1985 (aged 24)	(England) Wolverhampton Wanderers
26	Wade Small	(England)	CF	23 February 1984 (aged 25)	(England) Milton Keynes Dons
24	Luke Boden	(England)	CF	26 November 1988 (aged 20)	(England) Sheffield Wednesday Academy
30	Akpo Sodje	(England)	CF	31 January 1980 (aged 29)	(England) Port Vale
32	Nathan Modest	(England)	CF	29 September 1991 (aged 17)	(England) Sheffield Wednesday Academy

=== Reserve squad ===
Note: Flags indicate national team as defined under FIFA eligibility rules; some limited exceptions apply. Players may hold more than one non-FIFA nationality.

No.	Pos.	Nation	Player
26	DF	NIR	Liam McMenamin
29	DF	ENG	Sam Liversidge

No.	Pos.	Nation	Player
33	DF	ENG	Max Wragg

== Transfers ==
=== In ===
No.	Pos	Player	Transferred from	Fee	Date	Source
17	MF	(Republic of Ireland) James O'Connor	(England) Burnley	Free transfer	1 July 2008	
21	DF	(England) Lewis Buxton	(England) Stoke City	£87,000	31 January 2009	
19	DF	(England) Michael Gray	(England) Wolverhampton Wanderers	Free transfer	2 February 2009	

=== Out ===
No.	Pos	Player	Transferred To	Fee	Date	Source
2	DF	(Scotland) Lee Bullen	(Scotland) Falkirk	Free transfer	1 July 2008	
8	MF	(Scotland) Burton O'Brien	(Scotland) Falkirk	Free transfer	1 July 2008	
27	GK	(England) Rob Burch	(England) Lincoln City	Free transfer	1 July 2008	
28	DF	(England) James Kay	(England) Mansfield Town	Free transfer	1 July 2008	
21	MF	(Northern Ireland) Dave McClements	(Northern Ireland) Coleraine	Free transfer	1 July 2008	
10	FW	(Jamaica) Deon Burton (Note: Burton was born in Reading, England, but also qualified to represent Jamaica internationally and made his international debut for Jamaica in September 1997.)	(England) Charlton Athletic	Free transfer	27 November 2008	

=== Loan out ===
No.	Pos	Player	Loaned To	Start date	End date
24	FW	(England) Luke Boden	(England) Chesterfield	1 September 2008	1 October 2008
24	FW	(England) Luke Boden	(England) Rushden & Diamonds	1 November 2008	1 December 2008
4	MF	(England) Kenny Lunt	(England) Crewe Alexandra	1 November 2008	1 May 2009
27	GK	(England) Arron Jameson	(England) Gainsborough Trinity	29 November 2008	1 January 2009
28	DF	(England) Sam Liversidge	(England) Buxton	1 January 2009	1 May 2009
26	FW	(England) Wade Small	(England) Blackpool	13 March 2009	13 May 2009

=== Loan in ===
No.	Pos	Player	Loaned From	Start date	End date
14	MF	(England) Jimmy Smith	(England) Chelsea Academy	1 July 2008	31 December 2008
19	DF	(England) Tony McMahon	(England) Middlesbrough	1 August 2008	1 December 2008
29	FW	(Poland) Bartosz Ślusarski	(England) West Bromwich Albion	27 November 2008	31 December 2008
10	MF	(Republic of Ireland) Darren Potter	(England) Wolverhampton Wanderers	1 January 2009	1 May 2009
14	FW	(England) Luke Varney	(England) Charlton Athletic	1 March 2009	1 May 2009

== Competitions ==
=== Overview ===
Competition	Started round	Final position / round	First match	Last match
Championship	—	12th	9 August 2008	3 May 2009
FA Cup	3rd round	3rd round	3 January 2009	3 January 2009
Football League Cup	1st round	1st round	12 August 2008	12 August 2008

=== Championship ===
==== League table ====
Pos	Team	Pld	W	D	L	GF	GA	GD	Pts
10	Bristol City	46	15	16	15	54	54	0	61
11	Queens Park Rangers	46	15	16	15	42	44	−2	61
12	Sheffield Wednesday	46	16	13	17	51	58	−7	61
13	Watford	46	16	10	20	68	72	−4	58
14	Doncaster Rovers	46	17	7	22	42	53	−11	58

Updated to match(es) played on 3 May 2009. Source: The Football League
Rules for classification: 1) points; 2) goal difference; 3) number of goals scored.

==== Results summary ====
Overall								Home						Away					
Pld	W	D	L	GF	GA	GD	Pts	W	D	L	GF	GA	GD	W	D	L	GF	GA	GD
46	16	13	17	51	58	−7	61	11	6	6	26	14	+12	5	7	11	25	44	−19

==== Results by round ====
Round	1	2	3	4	5	6	7	8	9	10	11	12	13	14	15	16	17	18	19	20	21	22	23	24	25	26	27	28	29	30	31	32	33	34	35	36	37	38	39	40	41	42	43	44	45	46
Ground	H	A	H	A	H	A	H	A	H	A	H	A	A	H	A	H	A	H	A	H	A	H	H	A	H	A	A	H	A	H	A	A	H	H	A	H	H	A	A	H	A	H	A	H	A	H
Result	W	L	D	D	W	L	D	W	W	L	W	L	L	L	D	W	L	L	W	W	D	W	D	L	D	L	D	W	L	D	W	L	L	W	W	L	L	D	D	D	W	L	L	W	D	W
Position	13	11	14	5	13	14	14	5	10	5	10	12	15	15	11	13	16	16	15	12	12	10	10	11	11	13	12	12	13	13	12	12	13	12	12	12	12	12	13	13	12	12	12	12	12	12
Points	3	3	4	5	8	8	9	12	15	15	18	18	18	18	19	22	22	22	25	28	29	32	33	33	34	34	35	38	38	39	42	42	42	45	48	48	48	49	50	51	54	54	54	57	58	61

Source: 11v11
A = Away; H = Home; W = Win; D = Draw; L = Loss

==== Score overview ====
Win Draw Loss

Opposition	Home score	Away score	Aggregate score	Double
Barnsley	0–1	1–2	1–3	No
Birmingham City	1–1	1–3	2–4	No
Blackpool	1–1	2–0	3–1	No
Bristol City	0–0	1–1	1–1	No
Burnley	4–1	4–2	8–3	Yes
Cardiff City	1–0	0–2	1–2	No
Charlton Athletic	4–1	2–1	6–2	Yes
Coventry City	0–1	0–2	0–3	No
Crystal Palace	2–0	1–1	3–1	No
Derby County	0–1	0–3	0–4	No
Doncaster Rovers	1–0	0–1	1–1	No
Morecambe	1–3	1–2	2–5	No
Ipswich Town	0–0	1–1	1–1	No
Norwich City	2–0	1–0	3–0	Yes
Nottingham Forest	1–0	1–4	2–4	No
Plymouth Argyle	0–1	0–4	0–5	No
Preston North End	1–1	1–1	2–2	No
Queens Park Rangers	1–0	2–3	3–3	No
Reading	1–2	0–6	1–8	No
Sheffield United	1–0	2–1	3–1	Yes
Southampton	2–0	1–1	3–1	No
Swansea City	0–0	1–1	1–1	No
Watford	2–0	2–2	4–2	No
Wolverhampton Wanderers	0–1	1–4	1–5	No

==== Matches ====
9 August 2008 1	Sheffield Wednesday	4–1	Burnley	Sheffield
15:00 BST	Tudgay 1', 65'; Sodje 4', 17'; O'Connor (yellow card) 54'; Beevers (yellow card) 63'	Report	Paterson 6'; Blake (yellow card) 27'	Stadium: Hillsborough Stadium; Attendance: 23,793; Referee: Clive Oliver

16 August 2008 2	Wolverhampton Wanderers	4–1	Sheffield Wednesday	Wolverhampton
15:00 BST	Iwelumo 28', 59'; Ebanks-Blake 54'; Jones (yellow card) 76'; Edwards 90'	Report	Esajas 15'	Stadium: Molineux Stadium; Attendance: 22,491; Referee: Mike Jones

23 August 2008 3	Sheffield Wednesday	1–1	Preston North End	Sheffield
15:00 BST	McAllister 20'; Burton (yellow card) 82'; Esajas (yellow card) 90'	Report	Hill (yellow card) 39'; Chaplow 77'	Stadium: Hillsborough Stadium; Attendance: 17,693; Referee: Mike Russell

30 August 2008 4	Swansea City	1–1	Sheffield Wednesday	Swansea
15:00 BST	Bodde 36'; Burton (yellow card) 82'; Esajas (yellow card) 90'	Report	Burton (yellow card) 25'; McAllister (yellow card) 30'; McMahon (yellow card) 39'; Watson 70'	Stadium: Liberty Stadium; Attendance: 16,702; Referee: Kevin Friend

13 September 2008 5	Sheffield Wednesday	2–0	Watford	Sheffield
15:00 BST	Tudgay 22'; Watson (yellow card) 42'; Wood (yellow card) 44'; Spurr 55'	Report	Bromby (yellow card) 34'; Harley (yellow card) 88'	Stadium: Hillsborough Stadium; Attendance: 17,066; Referee: Graham Salisbury

16 September 2008 6	Reading	6–0	Sheffield Wednesday	Reading
20:00 BST	Doyle 5', 9', 62'; Bikey 30'; Hunt 50', 64'	Report	Gilbert (yellow card) 53'	Stadium: Madejski Stadium; Attendance: 18,159; Referee: Andy Woolmer

20 September 2008 7	Sheffield Wednesday	0–0	Ipswich Town	Sheffield
15:00 BST		Report		Stadium: Hillsborough Stadium; Attendance: 17,198; Referee: Mike Jones

27 September 2008 8	Charlton Athletic	1–2	Sheffield Wednesday	Charlton
15:00 BST	Varney 20', (yellow card) 36'	Report	McMahon (yellow card) 23'; Small 39'; Tudgay 42', (yellow card) 56'; O'Connor (yellow card) 45'	Stadium: The Valley; Attendance: 20,278; Referee: Dean Whitestone

30 September 2008 9	Sheffield Wednesday	1–0	Nottingham Forest	Sheffield
19:45 BST	McAllister (yellow card) 30'; Esajas 48'	Report		Stadium: Hillsborough Stadium; Attendance: 20,823; Referee: Andy D'Urso

4 October 2008 10	Plymouth Argyle	4–0	Sheffield Wednesday	Plymouth
15:00 BST	Beevers 15' (o.g.); Gallagher 25'; Mackie 30'; Seip 90'	Report		Stadium: Home Park; Attendance: 10,795; Referee: Roger East

19 October 2008 11	Sheffield Wednesday	1–0	Sheffield United	Sheffield
13:15 BST	Watson 35'; O'Connor (yellow card) 40'; Johnson (yellow card) 57' (yellow-red card) 68'; Sodje (yellow card) 90'	Report	Kilgallon (red card) 27'; Speed (yellow card) 46'; Naysmith (yellow card) 82'; Ehiogu (yellow card) 90'	Stadium: Hillsborough Stadium; Attendance: 30,441; Referee: Mike Dean

21 October 2008 12	Barnsley	2–1	Sheffield Wednesday	Barnsley
18:45 BST	Hume 4', (yellow card) 90'; Campbell-Ryce 61' (pen.); Souza (yellow card) 68'	Report	McMahon (red card) 34'; Beevers (yellow card) 61'; Clarke 69' (pen.); Gilbert (yellow card) 90'	Stadium: Oakwell; Attendance: 17,784; Referee: Phil Crossley

25 October 2008 13	Birmingham City	3–1	Sheffield Wednesday	Birmingham
15:00 GMT	G. O'Connor 11', 15'; Phillips 38'; Larsson (yellow card) 64'; McFadden (yellow card) 90'	Report	Esajas 14'; Smith (yellow card) 63' (yellow-red card) 69'; Buxton (yellow card) 83'	Stadium: St Andrew's Stadium; Attendance: 17,300; Referee: Paul Taylor

28 October 2008 14	Sheffield Wednesday	0–1	Plymouth Argyle	Sheffield
15:00 GMT		Report	MacLean 23'; McNamee (yellow card) 35'; Gallagher (yellow card) 76'	Stadium: Hillsborough Stadium; Attendance: 16,515; Referee: Graham Laws

1 November 2008 15	Crystal Palace	1–1	Sheffield Wednesday	Selhurst
15:00 GMT	B. Watson 54' (pen.), (yellow card) 74'	Report	Clarke 7'	Stadium: Selhurst Park; Attendance: 14,650; Referee: Kevin Wright

8 November 2008 16	Sheffield Wednesday	1–0	Doncaster Rovers	Sheffield
15:00 GMT	Clarke 43'	Report		Stadium: Hillsborough Stadium; Attendance: 20,872; Referee: Lee Mason

15 November 2008 17	Derby County	3–0	Sheffield Wednesday	Derby
15:00 GMT	Commons 31'; Addison 52'; Villa (yellow card) 56'; Stewart 67'	Report	Sodje (yellow card) 41'	Stadium: Pride Park Stadium; Attendance: 20,111; Referee: Keith Stroud

22 November 2008 18	Sheffield Wednesday	0–1	Coventry City	Sheffield
15:00 GMT	Johnson (yellow card) 28'	Report	Morrison 60'; Ward (yellow card) 73'; Eastwood (yellow card) 79'; Wright (yellow card) 84'	Stadium: Hillsborough Stadium; Attendance: 16,119; Referee: Kevin Friend

25 November 2008 19	Blackpool	0–2	Sheffield Wednesday	Blackpool
19:45 GMT		Report	Tudgay 61'; Burton 86'	Stadium: Bloomfield Road; Attendance: 7,054; Referee: Carl Boyeson

29 November 2008 20	Sheffield Wednesday	3–2	Norwich City	Sheffield
15:00 GMT	McMahon (yellow card) 45', (goal) 51'; Clarke 55'; Tudgay 72'	Report	Clingan 43' (pen.); Lita 62'	Stadium: Hillsborough Stadium; Attendance: 18,883; Referee: Tony Bates

6 December 2008 21	Southampton	1–1	Sheffield Wednesday	Southampton
15:00 GMT	Wright-Phillips 14'	Report	Tudgay 87', (yellow card) 88'	Stadium: St Mary's Stadium; Attendance: 15,440; Referee: Grant Hegley

9 December 2008 22	Sheffield Wednesday	1–0	Queens Park Rangers	Sheffield
19:45 GMT	Clarke 75'; Grant (yellow card) 90'	Report		Stadium: Hillsborough Stadium; Attendance: 14,792; Referee: Nigel Miller

13 December 2008 23	Sheffield Wednesday	0–0	Bristol City	Sheffield
15:00 GMT		Report		Stadium: Hillsborough Stadium; Attendance: 15,542; Referee: Rob Shoebridge

20 December 2008 24	Cardiff City	2–0	Sheffield Wednesday	Cardiff
15:00 GMT	Johnson 49'; Chopra 65' (pen.)	Report	McAllister (yellow card) 65'	Stadium: Ninian Park; Attendance: 17,600; Referee: Kevin Friend

26 December 2008 25	Sheffield Wednesday	1–1	Blackpool	Sheffield
15:00 GMT	Buxton (yellow card) 47'; Ślusarski 55'; O'Connor 82'	Report	Gow 48' (pen.); Reid (yellow card) 51'; Southern (yellow card) 67'; Taylor-Fletcher (yellow card) 90'; Dickinson (yellow card) 90'	Stadium: Hillsborough Stadium; Attendance: 25,044; Referee: Michael Oliver

28 December 2008 26	Coventry City	2–0	Sheffield Wednesday	Coventry
15:00 GMT	Morrison 11'; Simpson 82'	Report		Stadium: Ricoh Arena; Attendance: 19,602; Referee: Graham Laws

10 January 2009 27	Ipswich Town	1–1	Sheffield Wednesday	Ipswich
15:00 GMT	Campo (yellow card) 31'; Couñago 66'	Report	Spurr 52'	Stadium: Portman Road; Attendance: 22,213; Referee: Graham Horwood

17 January 2009 28	Sheffield Wednesday	4–1	Charlton Athletic	Sheffield
15:00 GMT	Potter 16'; Tudgay 38', 90' (pen.); Johnson (yellow card) 48'; Wood (yellow card) 53'; Jeffers 63', (yellow card) 63'; Boden (yellow card) 90'	Report	Spring (yellow card) 49', (goal) 86'; Randolph (yellow card) 82'	Stadium: Hillsborough Stadium; Attendance: 28,766; Referee: Darren Deadman

27 January 2009 29	Nottingham Forest	4–1	Sheffield Wednesday	West Bridgford
19:45 GMT	Tyson 34'; Breckin (yellow card) 47'; Chambers 75'; Garner (yellow card) 90'	Report	Johnson 27'; Jeffers (red card) 40'; Buxton (yellow card) 44'	Stadium: City Ground; Attendance: 22,618; Referee: Scott Mathieson

31 January 2009 30	Sheffield Wednesday	1–1	Birmingham City	Sheffield
17:20 GMT	Buxton 57'	Report	Taylor (yellow card) 59'; Phillips 90'; Murphy (yellow card) 90'	Stadium: Hillsborough Stadium; Attendance: 18,409; Referee: Phil Crossley

7 February 2009 31	Sheffield United	1–2	Sheffield Wednesday	Sheffield
12:00 GMT	Lupoli 5'	Report	Spurr 1'; Tudgay 29'; Beevers (yellow card) 44'; O'Connor (yellow card) 56'; Potter (yellow card) 61'	Stadium: Bramall Lane; Attendance: 30,786; Referee: Mark Halsey

14 February 2009 32	Doncaster Rovers	1–0	Sheffield Wednesday	Doncaster
15:00 GMT	Heffernan 31'; Wellens (yellow card) 42'	Report	O'Connor (yellow card) 61'; Buxton (yellow card) 90'	Stadium: Keepmoat Stadium; Attendance: 14,823; Referee: Neil Swarbrick

17 February 2009 33	Sheffield Wednesday	0–1	Barnsley	Sheffield
19:45 GMT	Johnson (yellow card) 53'	Report	Campbell-Ryce 38', (yellow card) 41'; Bruma (yellow card) 49'; Mifsud (yellow card) 76'; Moore (yellow card) 86'	Stadium: Hillsborough Stadium; Attendance: 25,820; Referee: Russell Booth

21 February 2009 34	Sheffield Wednesday	2–0	Crystal Palace	Sheffield
15:00 GMT	Jeffers (yellow card) 68'; McAllister 80'; Clarke 90'; Johnson (yellow card) 90'	Report	Clyne (yellow card) 35'; Lawrence 76'	Stadium: Hillsborough Stadium; Attendance: 22,687; Referee: Colin Webster

28 February 2009 35	Burnley	2–4	Sheffield Wednesday	Burnley
15:00 GMT	Jordan (yellow card) 35'; McCann 53'; Eagles 85'	Report	Tudgay 19', 69'; Clarke 79', 82', (yellow card) 80'	Stadium: Turf Moor; Attendance: 12,449; Referee: Andy D'Urso

3 March 2009 36	Sheffield Wednesday	1–2	Reading	Sheffield
19:45 GMT	McAllister 45'; Clarke (yellow card) 80'	Report	Rosenior (yellow card) 19'; Hunt (yellow card) 37'; Doyle 56'; Long 81'	Stadium: Hillsborough Stadium; Attendance: 19,268; Referee: Andy Hall

7 March 2009 37	Sheffield Wednesday	0–1	Wolverhampton Wanderers	Sheffield
15:00 GMT		Report	Ebanks-Blake 5'; Hill (yellow card) 58'; Keogh (yellow card) 83'; Stearman (yellow card) 89'	Stadium: Hillsborough Stadium; Attendance: 23,703; Referee: Scott Mathieson

7 March 2009 38	Preston North End	1–1	Sheffield Wednesday	Preston
15:00 GMT	Parkin 90'	Report	Jeffers 30'	Stadium: Deepdale; Attendance: 12,381; Referee: Andy Penn

14 March 2009 39	Watford	2–2	Sheffield Wednesday	Watford
15:00 GMT	Williamson (yellow card) 35'; Beevers 45' (o.g.); McAnuff 56', (yellow card) 83'	Report	Tudgay 20'; Jeffers (yellow card) 79', (goal) 90' (pen.); Wood (yellow card) 87'	Stadium: Vicarage Road; Attendance: 16,294; Referee: Andy Woolmer

21 March 2009 40	Sheffield Wednesday	0–0	Swansea City	Sheffield
15:00 GMT	Potter (yellow card) 61'; Varney (yellow card) 79'	Report	Williams (yellow card) 83'	Stadium: Hillsborough Stadium; Attendance: 22,564; Referee: Mike Jones

4 April 2009 41	Norwich City	0–1	Sheffield Wednesday	Norwich
15:00 GMT	Mooney (yellow card) 80'	Report	Johnson 48'; Wood (yellow card) 81'; Spurr (yellow card) 87' (yellow-red card) 89'	Stadium: Carrow Road; Attendance: 25,385; Referee: Mike Russell

11 April 2009 42	Sheffield Wednesday	0–1	Derby County	Sheffield
15:00 GMT	O'Connor (yellow card) 45'	Report	Hulse (yellow card) 13', (goal) 45'; Bywater (yellow card) 90'	Stadium: Hillsborough Stadium; Attendance: 24,391; Referee: Tanner

13 April 2009 43	Queens Park Rangers	3–2	Sheffield Wednesday	London
15:00 GMT	Taarabt (yellow card) 45'; Vine 62'; Cook (yellow card) 69'; Mahon 74'; Stewart 88'	Report	Mahon 35' (o.g.); Tudgay 53' (pen.)	Stadium: Loftus Road; Attendance: 13,742; Referee: Darren Deadman

18 April 2009 44	Sheffield Wednesday	2–0	Southampton	Sheffield
15:00 GMT	Varney 24', 73'	Report	James (yellow card) 89'	Stadium: Hillsborough Stadium; Attendance: 24,145; Referee: Rob Shoebridge

25 April 2009 45	Bristol City	1–1	Sheffield Wednesday	Ashton Gate
15:00 GMT	Johnson (yellow card) 25'; McAllister (yellow card) 53'	Report	Potter 88'	Stadium: Ashton Gate; Attendance: 17,486; Referee: Andy D'Urso

3 May 2009 46	Sheffield Wednesday	1–0	Cardiff City	Sheffield
15:00 GMT	Johnson 71', (yellow card) 78'	Report	Chopra (yellow card) 42'; McNaughton (yellow card) 72'	Stadium: Hillsborough Stadium; Attendance: 30,568; Referee: Phil Crossley

=== League Cup ===
12 August 2008 First round	Sheffield Wednesday	2–2 (a.e.t.) (3–5 p)	Rotherham United	Sheffield
19:45 BST	Esajas 14', 117'	Report	Rhodes 15'; Joseph (red card) 116'; Reid 119'	Stadium: Hillsborough Stadium; Attendance: 16,298; Referee: Nigel Miller
	Penalties
	Clarke (penalty scored); Esajas (penalty missed); O'Connor (penalty scored); McAllister (penalty scored)		(penalty scored) Mills; (penalty scored) Harrison; (penalty scored) Hudson; (penalty scored) Todd; (penalty scored) Reid

=== FA Cup ===
3 January 2009 Third round	Sheffield Wednesday	1–2	Fulham	Sheffield
15:00 BST	Spurr 21'; O'Connor (yellow card) 57'	Report	Johnson 12', 88'	Stadium: Hillsborough Stadium; Attendance: 18,377; Referee: Lee Mason

== Statistics ==
=== Appearances and goals ===
As of end of season.

No.	Pos	Nat	Player	Total		League Championship		FA Cup		League Cup	
No.	Pos	Nat	Player	Apps	Goals	Apps	Goals	Apps	Goals	Apps	Goals
1	GK	(England) ENG	Lee Grant	49	0	46	0	1	0	1+1	0
2	LB	(England) ENG	Tommy Spurr	44	4	41	3	1	1	1+1	0
3	LB	(Wales) WAL	Peter Gilbert	10	0	8	0	0	0	1+1	0
5	CB	(England) ENG	Richard Hinds	14	0	13+1	0	0	0	0	0
6	RB	(England) ENG	Steve Watson	24	2	15+7	2	0	0	1+1	0
7	CF	(England) ENG	Marcus Tudgay	42	14	42	14	0	0	0	0
8	CM	(England) ENG	Sean McAllister	41	3	37+3	3	1	0	0	0
9	CF	(England) ENG	Francis Jeffers	32	3	20+11	3	1	0	0	0
10	RW	(Republic of Ireland) IRL	Darren Potter	17	2	17	2	0	0	0	0
11	LW	(Netherlands) NED	Etiënne Esajas	24	5	18+4	3	0	0	1+1	2
12	RW	(Norway) NOR	Rocky Lekaj	3	0	0+2	0	0+1	0	0	0
14	CF	(England) ENG	Luke Varney	4	2	3+1	2	0	0	0	0
15	CB	(England) ENG	Mark Beevers	37	0	30+4	0	1	0	1+1	0
16	CB	(England) ENG	Richard Wood	45	0	42	0	1+1	0	1	0
17	CM	(Republic of Ireland) IRL	James O'Connor	44	0	35+6	0	1	0	1+1	0
18	CF	(England) ENG	Leon Clarke	31	8	20+9	8	0	0	1+1	0
19	LB	(England) ENG	Michael Gray	13	0	13	0	0	0	0	0
20	RB	(United States) USA	Frankie Simek	6	0	4+2	0	0	0	0	0
21	RB	(England) ENG	Lewis Buxton	32	1	31	1	0	0	1	0
22	GK	(England) ENG	Richard O'Donnell	0	0	0	0	0	0	0	0
23	RW	(Jamaica) JAM	Jermaine Johnson	38	3	29+8	3	1	0	0	0
24	CF	(England) ENG	Luke Boden	13	0	2+10	0	1	0	0	0
26	CB	(England) ENG	Liam McMenamin	0	0	0	0	0	0	0	0
28	GK	(England) ENG	Arron Jameson	0	0	0	0	0	0	0	0
30	CF	(England) ENG	Akpo Sodje	11	2	2+9	2	0	0	0	0
32	CF	(England) ENG	Nathan Modest	5	0	1+3	0	0+1	0	0	0
34	CB	(England) ENG	Max Wragg	0	0	0	0	0	0	0	0
Players who spent the season/part of the season out on loan, or left the club in January transfer window
4	CM	(England) ENG	Kenny Lunt	0	0	0	0	0	0	0	0
10	CF	(Jamaica) JAM	Deon Burton	20	1	10+8	1	0	0	1+1	0
14	RW	(England) ENG	Jimmy Smith	14	0	3+9	0	0	0	1+1	0
19	RB	(England) ENG	Tony McMahon	15	1	14+1	1	0	0	0	0
26	CF	(England) ENG	Wade Small	20	1	6+13	1	1	0	0	0
28	CB	(England) ENG	Sam Liversidge	0	0	0	0	0	0	0	0
29	CF	(Poland) POL	Bartosz Ślusarski	7	1	4+3	1	0	0	0	0

=== Goalscorers ===
As of end of season.

Rnk	No.	Pos	Player	Championship	FA Cup	League Cup	Total
1	7	FW	(England) Marcus Tudgay	14	0	0	14
2	18	FW	(England) Leon Clarke	8	0	0	8
3	11	MF	(Netherlands) Etiënne Esajas	3	0	2	5
4	2	DF	(England) Tommy Spurr	3	1	0	4
5	8	MF	(England) Sean McAllister	3	0	0	3
5	9	FW	(England) Francis Jeffers	3	0	0	3
5	23	MF	(Jamaica) Jermaine Johnson	3	0	0	3
8	6	DF	(England) Steve Watson	2	0	0	2
8	10	MF	(Republic of Ireland) Darren Potter	2	0	0	2
8	14	FW	(England) Luke Varney	2	0	0	2
8	30	FW	(England) Akpo Sodje	2	0	0	2
12	10	FW	(Jamaica) Deon Burton	1	0	0	1
12	19	DF	(England) Tony McMahon	1	0	0	1
12	21	DF	(England) Lewis Buxton	1	0	0	1
12	26	FW	(England) Wade Small	1	0	0	1
12	29	FW	(Poland) Bartosz Slusarski	1	0	0	1
Own Goals				1	0	0	1
TOTALS				51	1	2	54

=== Clean sheets ===
As of end of season.

Rnk	No.	Pos	Player	Championship	FA Cup	League Cup	Total
1	1	GK	(England) Lee Grant	13	0	0	13
TOTALS				13	0	0	13

=== Disciplinary record ===
As of end of season.

Rnk	Pos.	No.	Player	Championship			FA Cup			League Cup			Total (FA Total)		
Rnk	Pos.	No.	Player	Yellow card	(yellow card) (yellow-red card)	Red card	Yellow card	(yellow card) (yellow-red card)	Red card	Yellow card	(yellow card) (yellow-red card)	Red card	Yellow card	(yellow card) (yellow-red card)	Red card
1	MF	17	(England) James O'Connor	7	0	0	1	0	0	0	0	0	8	0	0
2	MF	23	(Jamaica) Jermaine Johnson	5	1	0	0	0	0	0	0	0	5	1	0
3	FW	9	(England) Francis Jeffers	3	0	1	0	0	0	0	0	0	3	0	1
3	DF	19	(England) Tony McMahon	3	0	1	0	0	0	0	0	0	3	0	1
3	DF	21	(England) Lewis Buxton	4	0	0	0	0	0	0	0	0	4	0	0
3	DF	15	(England) Mark Beevers	4	0	0	0	0	0	0	0	0	4	0	0
3	DF	16	(England) Richard Wood	4	0	0	0	0	0	0	0	0	4	0	0
8	MF	8	(England) Sean McAllister	3	0	0	0	0	0	0	0	0	3	0	0
9	FW	7	(England) Marcus Tudgay	2	0	0	0	0	0	0	0	0	2	0	0
9	FW	18	(England) Leon Clarke	2	0	0	0	0	0	0	0	0	2	0	0
9	MF	10	(Republic of Ireland) Darren Potter	2	0	0	0	0	0	0	0	0	2	0	0
9	FW	14	(England) Luke Varney	2	0	0	0	0	0	0	0	0	2	0	0
9	FW	30	(England) Akpo Sodje	2	0	0	0	0	0	0	0	0	2	0	0
9	FW	10	(Jamaica) Deon Burton	2	0	0	0	0	0	0	0	0	2	0	0
9	DF	3	(Wales) Peter Gilbert	2	0	0	0	0	0	0	0	0	2	0	0
9	MF	14	(England) Jimmy Smith	1	0	1	0	0	0	0	0	0	1	0	1
14	DF	2	(England) Tommy Spurr	0	0	1	0	0	0	0	0	0	0	0	1
14	MF	11	(Netherlands) Etiënne Esajas	1	0	0	0	0	0	0	0	0	1	0	0
14	DF	6	(England) Steve Watson	1	0	0	0	0	0	0	0	0	1	0	0
14	GK	1	(England) Lee Grant	1	0	0	0	0	0	0	0	0	1	0	0
14	FW	24	(England) Luke Boden	1	0	0	0	0	0	0	0	0	1	0	0
TOTALS				52	1	4	1	0	0	0	0	0	53	1	4

=== Overall ===
As of end of season.

Games played	48 (46 Championship, 1 FA Cup, 1 Football League Cup)
Games won	16 (16 Championship)
Games drawn	13 (13 Championship)
Games lost	19 (17 Championship, 1 FA Cup, 1 Football League Cup)
Goals scored	54 (51 Championship, 1 FA Cup, 2 Football League Cup)
Goals conceded	62 (58 Championship, 1 FA Cup, 2 Football League Cup)
Goal difference	–8 (–7 Championship, –1 FA Cup, 0 Football League Cup)
Clean sheets	13 (13 Championship)
Yellow cards	53 (52 Football League Cup, 1 FA Cup)
Red cards	4 (4 Football League Cup)
Worst discipline	(England) James O'Connor (7 (yellow card) )
Best result(s)	W 4–1 (H) v Burnley – Championship – 9 August 2008
Best result(s)	W 4–1 (H) v Charlton Athletic – Championship – 17 January 2009
Worst result(s)	L 6–0 (A) v Reading – Championship – 16 September 2008
Most appearances	(England) Lee Grant with 49 appearances
Top scorer(s)	(England) Marcus Tudgay (14 goals)
Top assister(s)	(Jamaica) Jermaine Johnson, (England) Leon Clarke & (Netherlands) Etiënne Esajas (5 assists)
