= 2015–16 Football League Cup =

Capital One Cup, League Cup

Tournament details
- Country: England; Wales
- Dates: 11 August 2015 – 28 February 2016
- Teams: 92

Final positions
- Champions: Manchester City (4th title)
- Runners-up: Liverpool

Tournament statistics
- Matches played: 93
- Goals scored: 284 (3.05 per match)
- Attendance: 1,430,554 (15,382 per match)
- Top goal scorer(s): Kevin De Bruyne (5 goals)

The 2015–16 Football League Cup (known as the Capital One Cup for sponsorship purposes) was the 56th season of the Football League Cup. It began on 11 August 2015 and concluded on 28 February 2016. It was a knock-out competition for the top 92 football clubs played in English football league system.

Chelsea were the defending champions, having beaten Tottenham Hotspur 2–0 in the previous season's final. However, they were eliminated in the fourth round by Stoke City on penalties.

Manchester City won the final on 28 February, defeating Liverpool 3–1 in a penalty shoot-out after the match had finished 1–1 after extra time.

This was the final season in which the tournament was known as the Football League Cup, as it was renamed the EFL Cup in 2016 after the Football League was rebranded as the English Football League (EFL).

== Format ==
The League Cup was open to all 92 members of the Premier League and the Football League and was divided into seven rounds, organised so that 32 teams remained by the third round. Teams involved in European competition during the season received a bye to the third round, the remaining Premier League teams entered at the second round, and the remaining Football League teams entered at the first round.

The League Cup was played as a knockout cup competition for each tie, being played as a single match (with the exception of the semi-finals) with the winner advancing to the next round. The semi-finals were played over two legs, with each team playing one leg at home, and the teams that scored more goals on aggregate over the two legs advancing to the final. If the score was level after 90 minutes, or if the aggregate score was level for semi-finals, then thirty minutes of extra time were played, divided into two fifteen-minute halves. If the aggregate scores in semi-finals were still level at the end of extra time, the tie was decided by goals scored away from home counting twice, according to the away goals rule. If the tie was not decided during extra time, it was determined by a penalty shoot-out.

In the first five rounds, the team drawn first played at their home ground, and in the semi-finals the team drawn first played the first leg at home. The final was played on a neutral ground.

== Team allocation ==
92 teams from the top four English tiers (Premier League, Football League Championship, Football League One and Football League Two) participated.

=== Distribution ===
The tournament was organised so that 32 teams remained by the third round. Teams involved in European competition received a bye to the third round, the remaining Premier League teams entered at the second round, and the remaining Football League teams entered at the first round.

- Teams involved in European competition enter at the third round.
- The remaining Premier League teams entered at the second round.
- The remaining Football League teams entered at the first round.

	Clubs entering in this round	Clubs advancing from previous round
First round (72 clubs)	24 clubs from Football League Two; 24 clubs from Football League One; 24 clubs from Football League Championship	N/A
Second round (48 clubs)	12 Premier League clubs (not involved in European competition)	36 winners from first round
Third round (32 clubs)	8 Premier League clubs (involved in European competition)	24 winners from second round
Fourth round (16 clubs)	No other entries	16 winners from third round
Quarter-finals (8 clubs)	No other entries	8 winners from fourth round
Semi-finals (4 clubs)	No other entries	4 winners from quarter-finals
Final (2 clubs)	No other entries	2 winners from semi-finals

== Round and draw dates ==
The schedule was as follows.

Round	Draw date	First leg	Second leg
First round	16 June 2015	10 August 2015	
Second round	13 August 2015	24 August 2015	
Third round	25 August 2015	21 September 2015	
Fourth round	23 September 2015	26 October 2015	
Quarter-finals	28 October 2015	30 November 2015	
Semi-finals	2 December 2015	4 January 2016	25 January 2016
Final		28 February 2016	

Note: Matches were played the week commencing on dates above except for the final, which was fixed for 28 February 2016.

== First round ==
A total of 72 teams played in the first round: 24 teams from League Two (tier 4), 24 teams from League One (tier 3), and 24 teams from the Championship (tier 2). The draw for the first round was held on 16 June 2015. (Note: The numbers in parentheses are the tier for the team during the 2015–16 season.)

=== Matches ===
The matches were played in the week commencing 10 August 2015.

==== Northern section ====
11 August 2015	Accrington Stanley (4)	2–2 (a.e.t.) (3–4 p)	Hull City (2)	Accrington
19:45 BST	Crooks 105'; Gornell 115'	Report	Akpom 92'; Luer 108'	Stadium: Crown Ground; Attendance: 2,118; Referee: David Webb
	Penalties
	Mingoia (penalty scored); Windass (penalty scored); Kee (penalty missed); McConville (penalty missed); Gornell (penalty scored); Crooks (penalty missed)		(penalty scored) Luer; (penalty missed) Maguire; (penalty scored) Huddlestone; (penalty scored) Akpom; (penalty missed) Meyler; (penalty scored) Davies

11 August 2015	Blackburn Rovers (2)	1–2	Shrewsbury Town (3)	Blackburn
19:45 BST	Lawrence 30' (o.g.)	Report	Collins 9'; Barnett 32'	Stadium: Ewood Park; Attendance: 5,280; Referee: Geoff Eltringham

11 August 2015	Carlisle United (4)	3–1 (a.e.t.)	Chesterfield (3)	Carlisle
19:45 BST	Ibehre 75', 108'; Osei 120'	Report	Dieseruvwe 84'	Stadium: Brunton Park; Attendance: 2,950; Referee: Sebastian Stockbridge

11 August 2015	Fleetwood Town (3)	0–1	Hartlepool United (4)	Fleetwood
19:45 BST		Report	Paynter 58'	Stadium: Highbury Stadium; Attendance: 1,892; Referee: Gary Sutton

11 August 2015	Huddersfield Town (2)	1–2	Notts County (4)	Huddersfield
19:45 BST	Wallace 35'	Report	Noble 42', 56'	Stadium: John Smith's Stadium; Attendance: 4,238; Referee: Jeremy Simpson

11 August 2015	Morecambe (4)	0–1	Sheffield United (3)	Morecambe
19:45 BST		Report	Collins 90'	Stadium: Globe Arena; Attendance: 2,168; Referee: Stephen Martin

11 August 2015	Northampton Town (4)	3–0	Blackpool (3)	Northampton
19:45 BST	Hackett 20'; Calvert-Lewin 24'; Hoskins 29'	Report		Stadium: Sixfields Stadium; Attendance: 2,549; Referee: James Adcock

11 August 2015	Nottingham Forest (2)	3–4	Walsall (3)	Nottingham
19:45 BST	Walker 32'; Antonio 81', 90'	Report	Bradshaw 11', 14', 90' (pen.); Sawyers 79'	Stadium: City Ground; Attendance: 5,237; Referee: Darren Handley

11 August 2015	Port Vale (3)	1–0	Burnley (2)	Burslem
19:45 BST	Moore 82'	Report		Stadium: Vale Park; Attendance: 4,634; Referee: Trevor Kettle

11 August 2015	Rochdale (3)	1–1 (a.e.t.) (5–3 p)	Coventry City (3)	Rochdale
19:45 BST	McDermott 45'	Report	Tudgay 84'	Stadium: Spotland Stadium; Attendance: 1,986; Referee: Eddie Ilderton
	Penalties
	Rose (penalty scored); Henderson (penalty scored); Kennedy (penalty scored); Rafferty (penalty scored); Andrew (penalty scored)		(penalty scored) Tudgay; (penalty scored) Morris; (penalty scored) Maddison; (penalty missed) Lameiras

11 August 2015	Rotherham United (2)	1–0	Cambridge United (4)	Rotherham
19:45 BST	Bowery 45'	Report		Stadium: New York Stadium; Attendance: 4,568; Referee: Christopher Sarginson

11 August 2015	Scunthorpe United (3)	1–1 (a.e.t.) (6–7 p)	Barnsley (3)	Scunthorpe
19:45 BST	Madden 52' (pen.)	Report	Scowen 47' (pen.)	Stadium: Glanford Park; Attendance: 3,003; Referee: Graham Salisbury
	Penalties
	Madden (penalty scored); Hopper (penalty scored); Adelakun (penalty scored); Laird (penalty scored); Bishop (penalty scored); Van Veen (penalty missed); Mirfin (penalty scored); McAllister (penalty missed)		(penalty scored) Winnall; (penalty scored) Hourihane; (penalty scored) Scowen; (penalty scored) Mawson; (penalty scored) Roberts; (penalty missed) Pearson; (penalty scored) Nyatanga; (penalty scored) Bree

11 August 2015	Sheffield Wednesday (2)	4–1	Mansfield Town (4)	Sheffield
19:45 BST	Lucas João 13'; Semedo 19'; Lee 53'; Sougou 84'	Report	Tafazolli 45'	Stadium: Hillsborough Stadium; Attendance: 14,021; Referee: Mark Brown

11 August 2015	Wigan Athletic (3)	1–2	Bury (3)	Wigan
19:45 BST	Grigg 46' (pen.)	Report	L. Clarke 63', 89' (pen.)	Stadium: DW Stadium; Attendance: 5,484; Referee: Mark Heywood

11 August 2015	York City (4)	2–2 (a.e.t.) (4–2 p)	Bradford City (3)	York
19:45 BST	Summerfield 49' (pen.); Berrett 85'	Report	Routis 21'; Hanson 90'	Stadium: Bootham Crescent; Attendance: 4,201; Referee: Mark Haywood
	Penalties
	Lowe (penalty scored); Hyde (penalty missed); Berrett (penalty scored); Thompson (penalty scored); Carson (penalty scored)		(penalty missed) McMahon; (penalty scored) Morris; (penalty missed) Routis; (penalty scored) Hanson

11 August 2015	Bolton Wanderers (2)	0–1	Burton Albion (3)	Bolton
20:00 BST		Report	Palmer 87'	Stadium: Macron Stadium; Attendance: 5,842; Referee: Richard Clark

12 August 2015	Crewe Alexandra (3)	1–3	Preston North End (2)	Crewe
19:45 BST	King 36'	Report	Hugill 5' (pen.); Keane 13'; Brownhill 86'	Stadium: Gresty Road; Attendance: 2,852; Referee: Scott Duncan

12 August 2015	Oldham Athletic (3)	1–3	Middlesbrough (2)	Oldham
19:45 BST	Philliskirk 90'	Report	Wildschut 23'; Stuani 41', 61'	Stadium: Boundary Park; Attendance: 4,182; Referee: Carl Boyeson

13 August 2015	Doncaster Rovers (3)	1–1 (a.e.t.) (4–2 p)	Leeds United (2)	Doncaster
19:45 BST	Williams 31' (pen.)	Report	L. Cook 14'	Stadium: Keepmoat Stadium; Attendance: 8,361; Referee: Keith Hill
	Penalties
	Tyson (penalty scored); Williams (penalty scored); Forrester (penalty scored); Wellens (penalty scored)		(penalty scored) Antenucci; (penalty scored) Murphy; (penalty missed) Byram; (penalty missed) Wood

==== Southern section ====
11 August 2015	Brentford (2)	0–4	Oxford United (4)	Brentford, London
19:45 BST		Report	Sercombe 5'; Hylton 9'; Roofe 12'; Mullins 54'	Stadium: Griffin Park; Attendance: 5,177; Referee: Lee Collins

11 August 2015	Bristol Rovers (4)	1–2	Birmingham City (2)	Bristol
19:45 BST	Harrison 65'	Report	Maghoma 57'; Shinnie 68'	Stadium: Memorial Stadium; Attendance: 5,650; Referee: Andy Davies

11 August 2015	Cardiff City (2)	1–0	AFC Wimbledon (4)	Cardiff, Wales
19:45 BST	Noone 45'	Report		Stadium: Cardiff City Stadium; Attendance: 6,314; Referee: Brendan Malone

11 August 2015	Charlton Athletic (2)	4–1	Dagenham & Redbridge (4)	Charlton, London
19:45 BST	Watt 26'; Ahearne-Grant 40'; Bergdich 57'; Ghoochannejhad 77'	Report	Doidge 69'	Stadium: The Valley; Attendance: 5,100; Referee: Stuart Attwell

11 August 2015	Colchester United (3)	0–1 (a.e.t.)	Reading (2)	Colchester
19:45 BST		Report	Gunter 115'	Stadium: Colchester Community Stadium; Attendance: 2,706; Referee: Darren Drysdale

11 August 2015	Ipswich Town (2)	2–1	Stevenage (4)	Ipswich
19:45 BST	Yorwerth 55'; Tabb 76'	Report	Berra 34' (o.g.)	Stadium: Portman Road; Attendance: 10,449; Referee: Frederick Graham

11 August 2015	Luton Town (4)	3–1	Bristol City (2)	Luton
19:45 BST	Marriott 44', 63'; Benson 59'	Report	Robinson 71'	Stadium: Kenilworth Road; Attendance: 3,948; Referee: James Linington

11 August 2015	Millwall (3)	1–2 (a.e.t.)	Barnet (4)	Bermondsey, London
19:45 BST	Morison 76'	Report	Akinde 11' (pen.); Yiadom 102'	Stadium: The Den; Attendance: 4,454; Referee: Andrew Madley

11 August 2015	Milton Keynes Dons (2)	2–1	Leyton Orient (4)	Milton Keynes
19:45 BST	Baudry 90' (o.g.); Baker 90'	Report	Lewington 36' (o.g.)	Stadium: Stadium MK; Attendance: 5,444; Referee: Simon Hooper

11 August 2015	Peterborough United (3)	2–0	Crawley Town (4)	Peterborough
19:45 BST	Washington 2'; Maddison 49'	Report		Stadium: London Road Stadium; Attendance: 2,500; Referee: Rob Lewis

11 August 2015	Plymouth Argyle (4)	1–2	Gillingham (3)	Plymouth
19:45 BST	Tanner 78'	Report	Dack 85'; Hessenthaler 87'	Stadium: Home Park; Attendance: 5,120; Referee: Kevin Johnson

11 August 2015	Southend United (3)	0–1	Brighton & Hove Albion (2)	Southend
19:45 BST		Report	LuaLua 90'	Stadium: Roots Hall; Attendance: 4,485; Referee: Iain Williamson

11 August 2015	Swindon Town (3)	1–2	Exeter City (4)	Swindon
19:45 BST	Obika 65'	Report	Nicholls 37'; Wheeler 42'	Stadium: County Ground; Attendance: 4,693; Referee: Charles Breakspear

11 August 2015	Wolverhampton Wanderers (2)	2–1	Newport County (4)	Wolverhampton
19:45 BST	Dicko 16'; Afobe 58' (pen.)	Report	Boden 6'	Stadium: Molineux Stadium; Attendance: 9,586; Referee: Darren Bond

11 August 2015	Wycombe Wanderers (4)	0–1	Fulham (2)	High Wycombe
19:45 BST		Report	Kačaniklić 69'	Stadium: Adams Park; Attendance: 4,012; Referee: Gavin Ward

11 August 2015	Yeovil Town (4)	0–3	Queens Park Rangers (2)	Yeovil
19:45 BST		Report	Polter 16'; Emmanuel-Thomas 20'; Onouha 56'	Stadium: Huish Park; Attendance: 4,058; Referee: Oliver Langford

12 August 2015	Portsmouth (4)	2–1	Derby County (2)	Portsmouth
19:45 BST	McGurk 49'; Chaplin 76'	Report	Shackell 73'	Stadium: Fratton Park; Attendance: 11,573; Referee: Paul Tierney

== Second round ==
A total of 48 teams played in the second round: 12 teams which entered in this round, and the 36 winners of the first round. The 12 teams entering this round were the teams from the 2015–16 Premier League not involved in any European competition. The draw for the second round was held on 13 August 2015. (Note: The numbers in parentheses are the tier for the team during the 2015–16 season.)

=== Matches ===
The matches were played in the week commencing 24 August 2015.

25 August 2015	Aston Villa (1)	5–3 (a.e.t.)	Notts County (4)	Aston, Birmingham
19:45 BST	Traoré 24'; Sinclair 50', 78' (pen.), 99'; Bennett 111'	Report	Snijders 16'; Stead 45' (pen.); Burke 56'	Stadium: Villa Park; Attendance: 21,430; Referee: Chris Kavanagh

25 August 2015	Walsall (3)	2–1	Brighton & Hove Albion (2)	Walsall
19:45 BST	Lalkovič 65'; Henry 86'	Report	Forster-Caskey 39' (pen.)	Stadium: Bescot Stadium; Attendance: 2,968; Referee: Peter Bankes

25 August 2015	Crystal Palace (1)	4–1 (a.e.t.)	Shrewsbury Town (3)	Selhurst, London
19:45 BST	Gayle 41' (pen.); Murray 95' (pen.); Lee Chung-yong 97'; Zaha 114'	Report	Tootle 9'	Stadium: Selhurst Park; Attendance: 10,978; Referee: Darren Bond

25 August 2015	Sheffield Wednesday (2)	1–0	Oxford United (4)	Sheffield
19:45 BST	Nuhiu 55'	Report		Stadium: Hillsborough Stadium; Attendance: 11,799; Referee: David Webb

25 August 2015	Portsmouth (4)	1–2	Reading (2)	Portsmouth
19:45 BST	Chaplin 40'	Report	Blackman 64'; McCleary 84'	Stadium: Fratton Park; Attendance: 18,190; Referee: Gavin Ward

25 August 2015	Hartlepool United (4)	0–4	Bournemouth (1)	Hartlepool
19:45 BST		Report	Kermorgant 30'; Gosling 34'; Stanislas 44', 64'	Stadium: Victoria Park; Attendance: 4,890; Referee: Carl Boyeson

25 August 2015	Fulham (2)	3–0	Sheffield United (3)	London
19:45 BST	McCormack 62' (pen.), 75'; Dembélé 90'	Report		Stadium: Craven Cottage; Attendance: 5,927; Referee: Dean Whitestone

25 August 2015	Milton Keynes Dons (2)	2–1 (a.e.t.)	Cardiff City (2)	Milton Keynes
19:45 BST	Baker 78'; Murphy 108'	Report	Revell 53'	Stadium: Stadium MK; Attendance: 5,617; Referee: Tim Robinson

25 August 2015	Hull City (2)	1–0	Rochdale (3)	Kingston upon Hull
19:45 BST	Luer 9'	Report		Stadium: KC Stadium; Attendance: 10,430; Referee: Mark Haywood

25 August 2015	Sunderland (1)	6–3	Exeter City (4)	Sunderland
19:45 BST	Rodwell 12', 64'; Defoe 16', 39', 87'; Watmore 78'	Report	Oyeleke 19'; Wheeler 31'; McCready 43'	Stadium: Stadium of Light; Attendance: 14,360; Referee: Stuart Attwell

25 August 2015	Bury (3)	1–4	Leicester City (1)	Bury
19:45 BST	Mayor 49'	Report	Dodoo 25', 86', 90'; Kramarić 41'	Stadium: Gigg Lane; Attendance: 4,914; Referee: Andrew Madley

25 August 2015	Doncaster Rovers (3)	1–4 (a.e.t.)	Ipswich Town (2)	Doncaster
19:45 BST	Williams 23'	Report	Pitman 58'; McGoldrick 102'; Alabi 105'; Fraser 113'	Stadium: Keepmoat Stadium; Attendance: 3,729; Referee: Scott Duncan

25 August 2015	Rotherham United (2)	1–2	Norwich City (1)	Rotherham
19:45 BST	Green 80'	Report	Howson 22'; Van Wolfswinkel 68'	Stadium: New York Stadium; Attendance: 5,648; Referee: Kevin Wright

25 August 2015	Swansea City (1)	3–0	York City (4)	Swansea
19:45 BST	Dyer 2'; Grimes 64'; Emnes 88'	Report		Stadium: Liberty Stadium; Attendance: 10,174; Referee: James Adcock

25 August 2015	Queens Park Rangers (2)	1–2	Carlisle United (4)	London
19:45 BST	Emmanuel-Thomas 40'	Report	Asamoah 37'; Kennedy 79'	Stadium: Loftus Road; Attendance: 5,501; Referee: James Linington

25 August 2015	Peterborough United (3)	1–4	Charlton Athletic (2)	Peterborough
19:45 BST	J. Anderson 90+3'	Report	Kennedy 3'; Ahearne-Grant 53' (pen.); Kashi 76'; Vetokele 87'	Stadium: London Road; Attendance: 2,771; Referee: Gary Sutton

25 August 2015	Birmingham City (2)	2–0	Gillingham (3)	Birmingham
19:45 BST	Thomas 35', 72'	Report		Stadium: St Andrew's; Attendance: 9,275; Referee: Graham Salisbury

25 August 2015	Newcastle United (1)	4–1	Northampton Town (4)	Newcastle upon Tyne
19:45 BST	Thauvin 3'; De Jong 8'; Janmaat 56'; Williamson 63'	Report	Richards 10' (pen.)	Stadium: St James' Park; Attendance: 26,923; Referee: David Coote

25 August 2015	Wolverhampton Wanderers (2)	2–1	Barnet (4)	Wolverhampton
19:45 BST	Enobokhare 3'; Ojo 58'	Report	Dembélé 76'	Stadium: Molineux Stadium; Attendance: 7,384; Referee: Mark Heywood

25 August 2015	Burton Albion (3)	1–2 (a.e.t.)	Middlesbrough (2)	Burton upon Trent
19:45 BST	Friend 24' (o.g.)	Report	Stuani 70', 109'	Stadium: Pirelli Stadium; Attendance: 3,414; Referee: Mark Brown

25 August 2015	Luton Town (4)	1–1 (a.e.t.) (7–8 p)	Stoke City (1)	Luton
19:45 BST	McGeehan 90'	Report	Walters 67'	Stadium: Kenilworth Road; Attendance: 6,099; Referee: Paul Tierney
	Penalties
	Benson (penalty scored); McGeehan (penalty scored); Lee (penalty scored); Wilkinson (penalty scored); Hall (penalty scored); O'Donnell (penalty scored); Smith (penalty scored); Griffiths (penalty missed)		(penalty scored) Walters; (penalty scored) Joselu; (penalty scored) Bardsley; (penalty scored) Sidwell; (penalty scored) Wilson; (penalty scored) Diouf; (penalty scored) Wollscheid; (penalty scored) Cameron

25 August 2015	Preston North End (2)	1–0	Watford (1)	Preston
19:45 BST	Vermijl 8'	Report		Stadium: Deepdale; Attendance: 6,250; Referee: Stephen Martin

25 August 2015	West Bromwich Albion (1)	0–0 (a.e.t.) (5–3 p)	Port Vale (3)	West Bromwich
20:00 BST		Report		Stadium: The Hawthorns; Attendance: 13,915; Referee: Keith Stroud
	Penalties
	Lambert (penalty scored); Yacob (penalty scored); McManaman (penalty scored); Fletcher (penalty scored); Chester (penalty scored)		(penalty scored) Leitch-Smith; (penalty missed) Duffy; (penalty scored) Purkiss; (penalty scored) Foley

26 August 2015	Barnsley (3)	3–5 (a.e.t.)	Everton (1)	Barnsley
19:45 BST	Winnall 22'; Watkins 28'; Crowley 60'	Report	Mirallas 51'; Naismith 59'; Lukaku 78', 115'; Roberts 96' (o.g.)	Stadium: Oakwell; Attendance: 12,290; Referee: Simon Hooper

== Third round ==
=== Teams ===
A total of 32 teams played in the third round: 8 teams which entered in this round, and the 24 winners of the second round. The eight teams entering this round were the teams from the 2015–16 Premier League involved in European competition in the 2015–16 season. There was no seeding in this round. The lowest ranked team in this round was Carlisle United, who played in League Two, the fourth division of English football.

=== Matches ===
The matches were played in the week commencing 21 September 2015.

22 September 2015	Middlesbrough (2)	3–0	Wolverhampton Wanderers (2)	Middlesbrough
19:45 BST	Adomah 37', 64'; Fabbrini 57'	Report		Stadium: Riverside Stadium; Attendance: 13,368; Referee: Kevin Wright

22 September 2015	Hull City (2)	1–0	Swansea City (1)	Kingston upon Hull
19:45 BST	Meyler 41'	Report		Stadium: KC Stadium; Attendance: 16,286; Referee: James Linington

22 September 2015	Leicester City (1)	2–1 (a.e.t.)	West Ham United (1)	Leicester
19:45 BST	Dodoo 6'; King 116'	Report	Zárate 27'	Stadium: King Power Stadium; Attendance: 21,268; Referee: Peter Bankes

22 September 2015	Aston Villa (1)	1–0	Birmingham City (2)	Aston, Birmingham
19:45 BST	Gestede 62'	Report		Stadium: Villa Park; Attendance: 34,442; Referee: Bobby Madley

22 September 2015	Fulham (2)	0–1	Stoke City (1)	Fulham, London
19:45 BST		Report	Crouch 33'	Stadium: Craven Cottage; Attendance: 9,100; Referee: Stuart Attwell

22 September 2015	Sunderland (1)	1–4	Manchester City (1)	Sunderland
19:45 BST	Toivonen 83'	Report	Agüero 9' (pen.); De Bruyne 25'; Mannone 33' (o.g.); Sterling 36'	Stadium: Stadium of Light; Attendance: 21,644; Referee: Roger East

22 September 2015	Preston North End (2)	2–2 (a.e.t.) (2–3 p)	Bournemouth (1)	Preston
19:45 BST	Hugill 84'; Johnson 118' (pen.)	Report	MacDonald 23'; Pugh 96'	Stadium: Deepdale; Attendance: 5,643; Referee: Nigel Miller
	Penalties
	Hugill (penalty missed); Keane (penalty scored); Reid (penalty scored); Browne (penalty missed); Johnson (penalty missed)		(penalty scored) Stanislas; (penalty scored) Cook; (penalty missed) Gosling; (penalty scored) Pugh

22 September 2015	Reading (2)	1–2	Everton (1)	Reading
20:00 BST	Blackman 36'	Report	Barkley 62'; Deulofeu 73'	Stadium: Madejski Stadium; Attendance: 19,435; Referee: Keith Hill

23 September 2015	Norwich City (1)	3–0	West Bromwich Albion (1)	Norwich
19:45 BST	Jarvis 62'; Lafferty 85'; Pocognoli 90' (o.g.)	Report		Stadium: Carrow Road; Attendance: 19,015; Referee: Craig Pawson

23 September 2015	Tottenham Hotspur (1)	1–2	Arsenal (1)	Tottenham, London
19:45 BST	Chambers 56' (o.g.)	Report	Flamini 26', 78'	Stadium: White Hart Lane; Attendance: 35,687; Referee: Andre Marriner

23 September 2015	Crystal Palace (1)	4–1	Charlton Athletic (2)	Selhurst, London
19:45 BST	Campbell 51'; Gayle 59' (pen.), 74' (pen.), 86'	Report	Sarr 65'	Stadium: Selhurst Park; Attendance: 16,576; Referee: Neil Swarbrick

23 September 2015	Newcastle United (1)	0–1	Sheffield Wednesday (2)	Newcastle upon Tyne
19:45 BST		Report	McGugan 76'	Stadium: St James' Park; Attendance: 33,986; Referee: Chris Kavanagh

23 September 2015	Walsall (3)	1–4	Chelsea (1)	Walsall
19:45 BST	O'Connor 45'	Report	Ramires 10'; Rémy 41'; Kenedy 52'; Pedro 90'	Stadium: Bescot Stadium; Attendance: 10,525; Referee: Lee Mason

23 September 2015	Milton Keynes Dons (2)	0–6	Southampton (1)	Milton Keynes
19:45 BST		Report	Rodriguez 5', 48' (pen.); Mané 10', 25'; Long 68', 75'	Stadium: Stadium MK; Attendance: 10,189; Referee: Keith Stroud

23 September 2015	Manchester United (1)	3–0	Ipswich Town (2)	Old Trafford, Manchester
20:00 BST	Rooney 23'; Pereira 60'; Martial 90+2'	Report		Stadium: Old Trafford; Attendance: 56,607; Referee: Simon Hooper

23 September 2015	Liverpool (1)	1–1 (a.e.t.) (3–2 p)	Carlisle United (4)	Liverpool
20:00 BST	Ings 23'	Report	Asamoah 34'	Stadium: Anfield; Attendance: 42,518; Referee: Andrew Madley
	Penalties
	Milner (penalty scored); Can (penalty scored); Lallana (penalty missed); Coutinho (penalty missed); Ings (penalty scored)		(penalty missed) Grainger; (penalty scored) Dicker; (penalty missed) Joyce; (penalty scored) McQueen; (penalty missed) Héry

== Fourth round ==
=== Teams ===
A total of 16 teams played in the fourth round, all winners of the third round. There was no seeding in this round. The draw for the fourth round was held on 23 September 2015 after the North London derby. (Note: The numbers in parentheses are the tier for the team during the 2015–16 season.) The lowest ranked teams in this round were Hull City, Middlesbrough, and Sheffield Wednesday who all played in the Championship, the second division of English football.

=== Matches ===
The matches were played in the week commencing 26 October 2015.

27 October 2015	Everton (1)	1–1 (a.e.t.) (4–3 p)	Norwich City (1)	Liverpool
19:45 GMT	Osman 68'	Report	Bassong 51'	Stadium: Goodison Park; Attendance: 31,694; Referee: Roger East
	Penalties
	Deulofeu (penalty scored); Barkley (penalty scored); Lukaku (penalty scored); Gibson (penalty scored)		(penalty scored) Dorrans; (penalty scored) Whittaker; (penalty missed) Hoolahan; (penalty scored) Grabban; (penalty missed) Redmond

27 October 2015	Sheffield Wednesday (2)	3–0	Arsenal (1)	Sheffield
19:45 GMT	Wallace 27'; Lucas João 40'; Hutchinson 51'	Report		Stadium: Hillsborough Stadium; Attendance: 35,065; Referee: Graham Scott

27 October 2015	Hull City (2)	1–1 (a.e.t.) (5–4 p)	Leicester City (1)	Kingston upon Hull
19:45 GMT	Hernández 106'	Report	Mahrez 100'	Stadium: KC Stadium; Attendance: 16,818; Referee: Stuart Attwell
	Penalties
	Hernández (penalty scored); Maloney (penalty scored); Huddlestone (penalty scored); Akpom (penalty scored); Meyler (penalty scored)		(penalty missed) Mahrez; (penalty scored) Drinkwater; (penalty scored) Inler; (penalty scored) Wasilewski; (penalty scored) Vardy

27 October 2015	Stoke City (1)	1–1 (a.e.t.) (5–4 p)	Chelsea (1)	Stoke-on-Trent
19:45 GMT	Walters 52'	Report	Rémy 90+1'	Stadium: Britannia Stadium; Attendance: 24,886; Referee: Kevin Friend
	Penalties
	Adam (penalty scored); Odemwingie (penalty scored); Shaqiri (penalty scored); Wilson (penalty scored); Arnautović (penalty scored)		(penalty scored) Willian; (penalty scored) Oscar; (penalty scored) Rémy; (penalty scored) Zouma; (penalty missed) Hazard

28 October 2015	Manchester City (1)	5–1	Crystal Palace (1)	Manchester
19:45 GMT	Bony 22'; De Bruyne 44'; Iheanacho 59'; Touré 76' (pen.); García 90'	Report	Delaney 89'	Stadium: Etihad Stadium; Attendance: 40,585; Referee: Paul Tierney

28 October 2015	Liverpool (1)	1–0	Bournemouth (1)	Liverpool
19:45 GMT	Clyne 17'	Report		Stadium: Anfield; Attendance: 41,948; Referee: Mike Jones

28 October 2015	Southampton (1)	2–1	Aston Villa (1)	Southampton
19:45 GMT	Yoshida 51'; Pellè 77'	Report	Sinclair 90' (pen.)	Stadium: St Mary's Stadium; Attendance: 31,314; Referee: Keith Stroud

28 October 2015	Manchester United (1)	0–0 (a.e.t.) (1–3 p)	Middlesbrough (2)	Manchester
20:00 GMT		Report		Stadium: Old Trafford; Attendance: 67,258; Referee: Lee Mason
	Penalties
	Rooney (penalty missed); Pereira (penalty scored); Carrick (penalty missed); Young (penalty missed)		(penalty scored) Leadbitter; (penalty missed) Nugent; (penalty scored) Downing; (penalty scored) Gibson

== Quarter-finals ==
=== Teams ===
A total of eight teams played in the quarter-finals, all winners of the fourth round. There was no seeding in this round. The draw for the fifth round was held on 28 October after the completion of the fourth round. The lowest ranked teams in this round were Hull City, Middlesbrough and Sheffield Wednesday, who all played in the Championship, the second division of English football.

=== Matches ===
The matches were played in the week commencing 30 November 2015.

1 December 2015	Middlesbrough (2)	0–2	Everton (1)	Middlesbrough
19:45 GMT		Report	Deulofeu 20'; Lukaku 28'	Stadium: Riverside Stadium; Attendance: 31,628; Referee: Roger East

1 December 2015	Stoke City (1)	2–0	Sheffield Wednesday (2)	Stoke-on-Trent
19:45 GMT	Afellay 30'; Bardsley 75'	Report		Stadium: Britannia Stadium; Attendance: 26,779; Referee: Jon Moss

1 December 2015	Manchester City (1)	4–1	Hull City (2)	Manchester
19:45 GMT	Bony 12'; Iheanacho 80'; De Bruyne 82', 87'	Report	Robertson 90+2'	Stadium: Etihad Stadium; Attendance: 38,246; Referee: Neil Swarbrick

2 December 2015	Southampton (1)	1–6	Liverpool (1)	Southampton
19:45 GMT	Mané 1'	Report	Sturridge 25', 29'; Origi 45', 68', 86'; Ibe 73'	Stadium: St Mary's Stadium; Attendance: 31,592; Referee: Bobby Madley

== Semi-finals ==
=== Teams ===
A total of four teams played in the semi-finals, all winners of the quarter-finals. There was no seeding in this round. The draw for the semi-finals was held on 2 December 2015 and all of the remaining teams were from the Premier League (top tier).

=== Matches ===
The semi-finals were played over two legs, with each team playing one leg at home, and the teams that scored more goals on aggregate over the two legs advanced to the final.

==== First leg ====
The first leg matches were played on 5 and 6 January 2016.

5 January 2016	Stoke City (1)	0–1	Liverpool (1)	Stoke-on-Trent
20:00 GMT		Report	Ibe 37'	Stadium: Britannia Stadium; Attendance: 27,369; Referee: Anthony Taylor

6 January 2016	Everton (1)	2–1	Manchester City (1)	Liverpool
20:00 GMT	Funes Mori 45'; Lukaku 78'	Report	Navas 76'	Stadium: Goodison Park; Attendance: 34,027; Referee: Bobby Madley

==== Second leg ====
The second leg were played on 26 and 27 January 2016.

26 January 2016	Liverpool (1)	0–1 (a.e.t.) (1–1 agg.) (6–5 p)	Stoke City (1)	Liverpool
19:45 GMT		Report	Arnautović 45+1'	Stadium: Anfield; Attendance: 43,091; Referee: Jon Moss
	Penalties
	Lallana (penalty scored); Can (penalty missed); Benteke (penalty scored); Firmino (penalty scored); Milner (penalty scored); Lucas (penalty scored); Allen (penalty scored)		(penalty scored) Walters; (penalty missed) Crouch; (penalty scored) Whelan; (penalty scored) Afellay; (penalty scored) Shaqiri; (penalty scored) Van Ginkel; (penalty missed) Muniesa

27 January 2016	Manchester City (1)	3–1 (4–3 agg.)	Everton (1)	Manchester
19:45 GMT	Fernandinho 24'; De Bruyne 70'; Agüero 76'	Report	Barkley 18'	Stadium: Etihad Stadium; Attendance: 50,048; Referee: Martin Atkinson

== Final ==
The League Cup Final was held on 28 February 2016 at Wembley Stadium.

28 February 2016
16:30 GMT

Liverpool	1–1 (a.e.t.)	Manchester City
Coutinho 83'	Report	Fernandinho 49'
Penalties
Can (penalty scored); Lucas (penalty missed); Coutinho (penalty missed); Lallana (penalty missed)	1–3	(penalty missed) Fernandinho; (penalty scored) Navas; (penalty scored) Agüero; (penalty scored) Touré

Wembley Stadium, London
Attendance: 86,206
Referee: Michael Oliver

== Top goalscorers ==
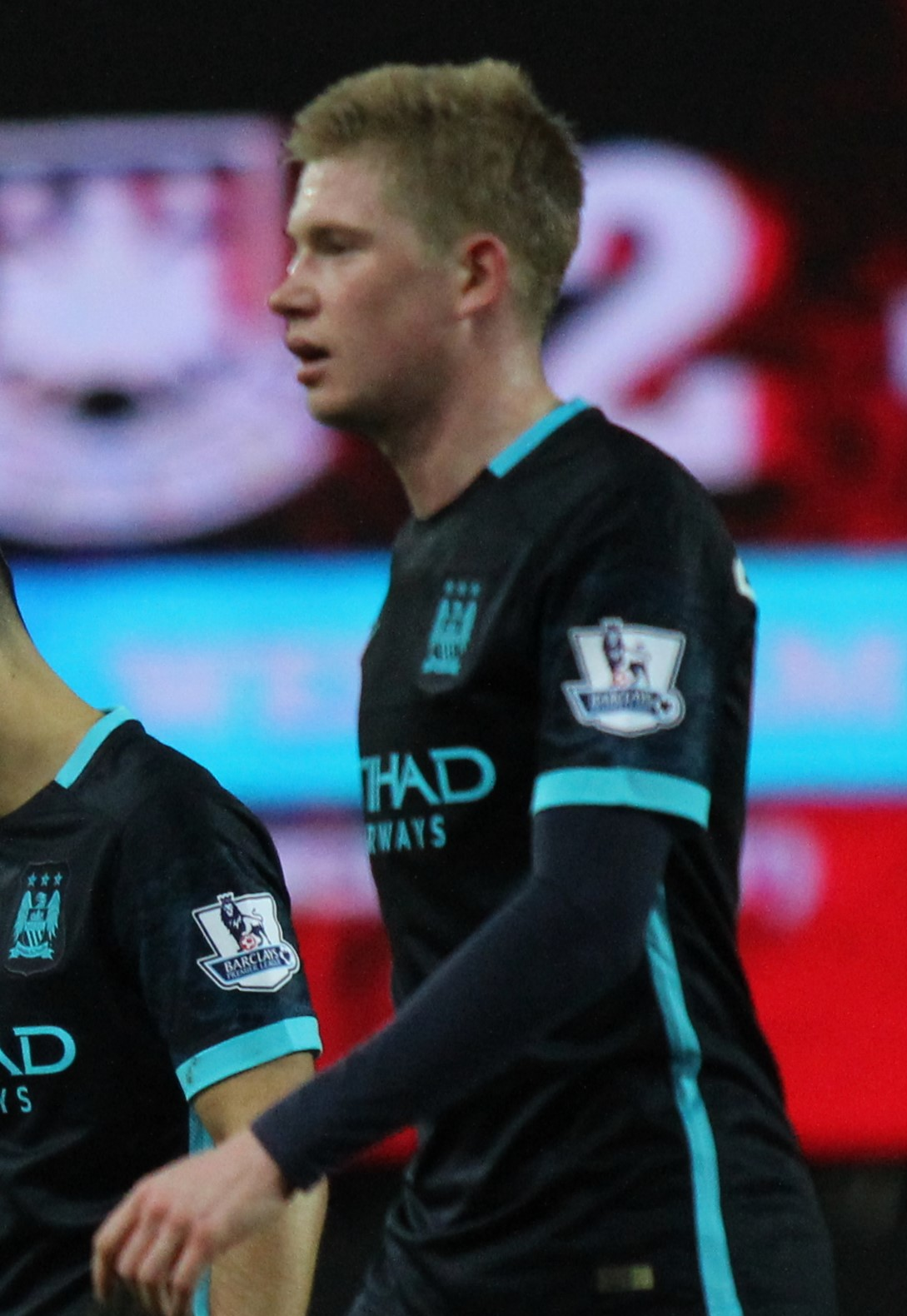
Kevin De Bruyne was the top scorer in the competition with five goals for Manchester City.

Rank	Player	Club	Goals
1	(Belgium) Kevin De Bruyne	Manchester City	5
2	(England) Joe Dodoo	Leicester City	4
2	(England) Dwight Gayle	Crystal Palace	4
2	(Belgium) Romelu Lukaku	Everton	4
2	(England) Scott Sinclair	Aston Villa	4
2	(Uruguay) Cristhian Stuani	Middlesbrough	4
7	(Wales) Tom Bradshaw	Walsall	3
7	(England) Jermain Defoe	Sunderland	3
7	(Senegal) Sadio Mané	Southampton	3
7	(Belgium) Divock Origi	Liverpool	3

== Broadcasting rights ==
The live television rights for the competition were held by the subscription channel Sky Sports, who have held rights to the competition since 1996–97 apart from 2001-02 when the short-lived ITV Digital had exclusive coverage of that season's League Cup competition as part of the original three year TV deal with The Football League.

These matches were televised live by Sky Sports:

Round	Live TV games
First round	Portsmouth vs Derby County, Doncaster Rovers vs Leeds United
Second round	Luton Town vs Stoke City, Barnsley vs Everton
Third Round	Aston Villa vs Birmingham City, Tottenham Hotspur vs Arsenal
Fourth Round	Sheffield Wednesday vs Arsenal, Liverpool vs Bournemouth
Quarter-finals	Middlesbrough vs Everton, Southampton vs Liverpool
Semi-finals	All 4 Matches
Final	Liverpool vs Manchester City

== See also ==
- 2015–16 Premier League
- 2015–16 Football League Championship
- 2015–16 Football League One
- 2015–16 Football League Two
- 2015–16 FA Cup
