= 2007–08 Sheffield Wednesday F.C. season =

English football club season

Sheffield Wednesday
2007–08 season
- Chairman: Dave Allen
- Manager: Brian Laws
- Stadium: Hillsborough
- Championship: 16th
- FA Cup: Third round
- League Cup: Third round
- Top goalscorer: League: Burton/Sodje/Tudgay (7); All: Burton (9)
- Average home league attendance: 21,418

During the 2007–08 English football season, Sheffield Wednesday F.C. competed in the Football League Championship.

== Season summary ==
In the 2007–08 season, the Owls made their worst ever start to a season, losing six league games in a row. Chairman Dave Allen resigned in November 2007, and Wednesday avoided relegation with a win on the last day of the season.

== Final league table ==
Pos	Team	Pld	W	D	L	GF	GA	GD	Pts
14	Queens Park Rangers	46	14	16	16	60	66	−6	58
15	Preston North End	46	15	11	20	50	56	−6	56
16	Sheffield Wednesday	46	14	13	19	54	55	−1	55
17	Norwich City	46	15	10	21	49	59	−10	55
18	Barnsley	46	14	13	19	52	65	−13	55

Updated to match(es) played on 4 May 2008. Source: The Football League
Rules for classification: 1) points; 2) goal difference; 3) number of goals scored.

== Results ==
Sheffield Wednesday's score comes first

=== Legend ===
Win	Draw	Loss

=== Football League Championship ===
Date	Opponent	Venue	Result	Attendance	Scorers
11 August 2007	Ipswich Town	A	1–4	23,099	Clarke
19 August 2007	Wolverhampton Wanderers	H	1–3	22,131	Small
25 August 2007	Charlton Athletic	A	2–3	22,033	O'Brien, Spurr
1 September 2007	Bristol City	H	0–1	17,559	
15 September 2007	Preston North End	A	0–1	13,062	
18 September 2007	Burnley	H	0–2	18,359	
22 September 2007	Hull City	H	1–0	21,518	Jeffers
29 September 2007	Norwich City	A	1–0	23,293	Small
2 October 2007	Watford	A	1–2	15,473	Kavanagh
6 October 2007	Leicester City	H	0–2	20,010	
20 October 2007	Stoke City	A	4–2	14,019	J Johnson, Tudgay (2), Burton
23 October 2007	Scunthorpe United	H	1–2	21,557	Burton (pen)
27 October 2007	Blackpool	H	2–1	19,238	Tudgay, Hinds
3 November 2007	Plymouth Argyle	A	2–1	12,145	Sodje, O'Brien
6 November 2007	West Bromwich Albion	A	1–1	19,807	Watson
10 November 2007	Southampton	H	5–0	19,442	Whelan (2, 1 pen), Sodje (2), O'Brien
24 November 2007	Queens Park Rangers	A	0–0	15,241	
27 November 2007	Barnsley	H	1–0	27,769	Sodje
1 December 2007	Colchester United	H	1–2	22,331	Sodje
4 December 2007	Southampton	A	0–0	17,981	
15 December 2007	Crystal Palace	A	1–2	14,865	Hinds
22 December 2007	Watford	H	0–1	19,641	
26 December 2007	Burnley	A	1–1	15,326	Burton (pen)
30 December 2007	Hull City	A	0–1	21,252	
1 January 2008	Preston North End	H	2–1	20,690	Sodje, Jeffers (pen)
12 January 2008	Cardiff City	A	0–1	14,015	
19 January 2008	Sheffield United	H	2–0	30,486	Sodje, Tudgay
29 January 2008	Wolverhampton Wanderers	A	1–2	22,746	Tudgay
2 February 2008	Ipswich Town	H	1–2	19,092	Tudgay
9 February 2008	Bristol City	A	1–2	15,520	Bullen
12 February 2008	Charlton Athletic	H	0–0	17,211	
23 February 2008	Cardiff City	H	1–0	18,539	Tudgay
1 March 2008	Barnsley	A	0–0	18,257	
4 March 2008	West Bromwich Albion	H	0–1	18,805	
8 March 2008	Queens Park Rangers	H	2–1	18,555	Kavanagh, Burton (pen)
11 March 2008	Colchester United	A	2–1	5,086	Burton, Small
15 March 2008	Coventry City	A	0–0	19,283	
22 March 2008	Crystal Palace	H	2–2	19,875	Sahar, Small
29 March 2008	Stoke City	H	1–1	21,857	Songo'o
1 April 2008	Coventry City	H	1–1	21,110	Wood
5 April 2008	Scunthorpe United	A	1–1	7,425	Sahar
8 April 2008	Sheffield United	A	2–2	31,760	Bolder (2)
14 April 2008	Plymouth Argyle	H	1–1	20,635	Spurr
19 April 2008	Blackpool	A	1–2	9,633	Wood
26 April 2008	Leicester City	A	3–1	31,892	Slusarski, Watson, Clarke
4 May 2008	Norwich City	H	4–1	36,208	Burton (2, 1 pen), Sahar, Clarke

=== FA Cup ===
Round	Date	Opponent	Venue	Result	Attendance	Goalscorers
R3	6 January 2008	Derby County	A	2–2	20,094	Beevers, Tudgay
R3R	22 January 2008	Derby County	H	1–1 (lost 2–4 on pens)	25,449	Watson

=== League Cup ===
Round	Date	Opponent	Venue	Result	Attendance	Goalscorers
R1	16 August 2007	Rotherham United	A	3–1	6,416	Whelan, Burton, Small
R2	28 August 2007	Hartlepool United	H	2–1 (a.e.t.)	8,751	Burton, Folly
R3	26 September 2007	Everton	H	0–3	16,463	

== Squad ==
Note: Flags indicate national team as defined under FIFA eligibility rules; some limited exceptions apply. Players may hold more than one non-FIFA nationality.

No.	Pos.	Nation	Player
1	GK	ENG	Lee Grant
2	DF	SCO	Lee Bullen
3	DF	ENG	Peter Gilbert
4	MF	ENG	Kenny Lunt
5	DF	ENG	Richard Hinds
6	MF	IRL	Graham Kavanagh (on loan from Sunderland)
7	FW	ENG	Marcus Tudgay
8	MF	SCO	Burton O'Brien
9	FW	ENG	Francis Jeffers
10	FW	JAM	Deon Burton
11	FW	NED	Etiënne Esajas
12	MF	NOR	Rocky Lekaj
14	MF	ENG	Sean McAllister
15	DF	ENG	Mark Beevers
16	DF	ENG	Richard Wood
17	DF	ENG	Steve Watson
18	FW	ENG	Leon Clarke

No.	Pos.	Nation	Player
19	FW	ENG	Jason Bradley
20	DF	USA	Frankie Simek
21	MF	NIR	Dave McClements
22	GK	ENG	Richard O'Donnell
23	MF	JAM	Jermaine Johnson
24	MF	ENG	Luke Boden
25	DF	NIR	Liam McMenamin
26	MF	ENG	Wade Small
27	GK	ENG	Rob Burch
28	DF	ENG	James Kay
29	MF	ENG	Adam Bolder (on loan from QPR)
30	FW	ENG	Akpo Sodje
32	DF	ENG	Tommy Spurr
33	DF	ENG	Ronnie Wallwork
34	FW	ISR	Ben Sahar (on loan from Chelsea)
35	MF	CMR	Franck Songo'o (on loan from Portsmouth)
36	FW	POL	Bartosz Ślusarski (on loan from West Bromwich Albion)

=== Left club during season ===
Note: Flags indicate national team as defined under FIFA eligibility rules; some limited exceptions apply. Players may hold more than one non-FIFA nationality.

No.	Pos.	Nation	Player
11	MF	NIR	Chris Brunt (to West Bromwich Albion)
33	MF	IRL	Graham Kavanagh (on loan from Sunderland)
31	MF	FRA	Yoann Folly (to Plymouth Argyle)

No.	Pos.	Nation	Player
29	DF	JAM	Michael Johnson (on loan from Derby County)
6	MF	IRL	Glenn Whelan (to Stoke City)
31	FW	NGA	Enoch Showunmi (on loan from Bristol City)
