= Tommy Spurr =

English footballer (born 1987)

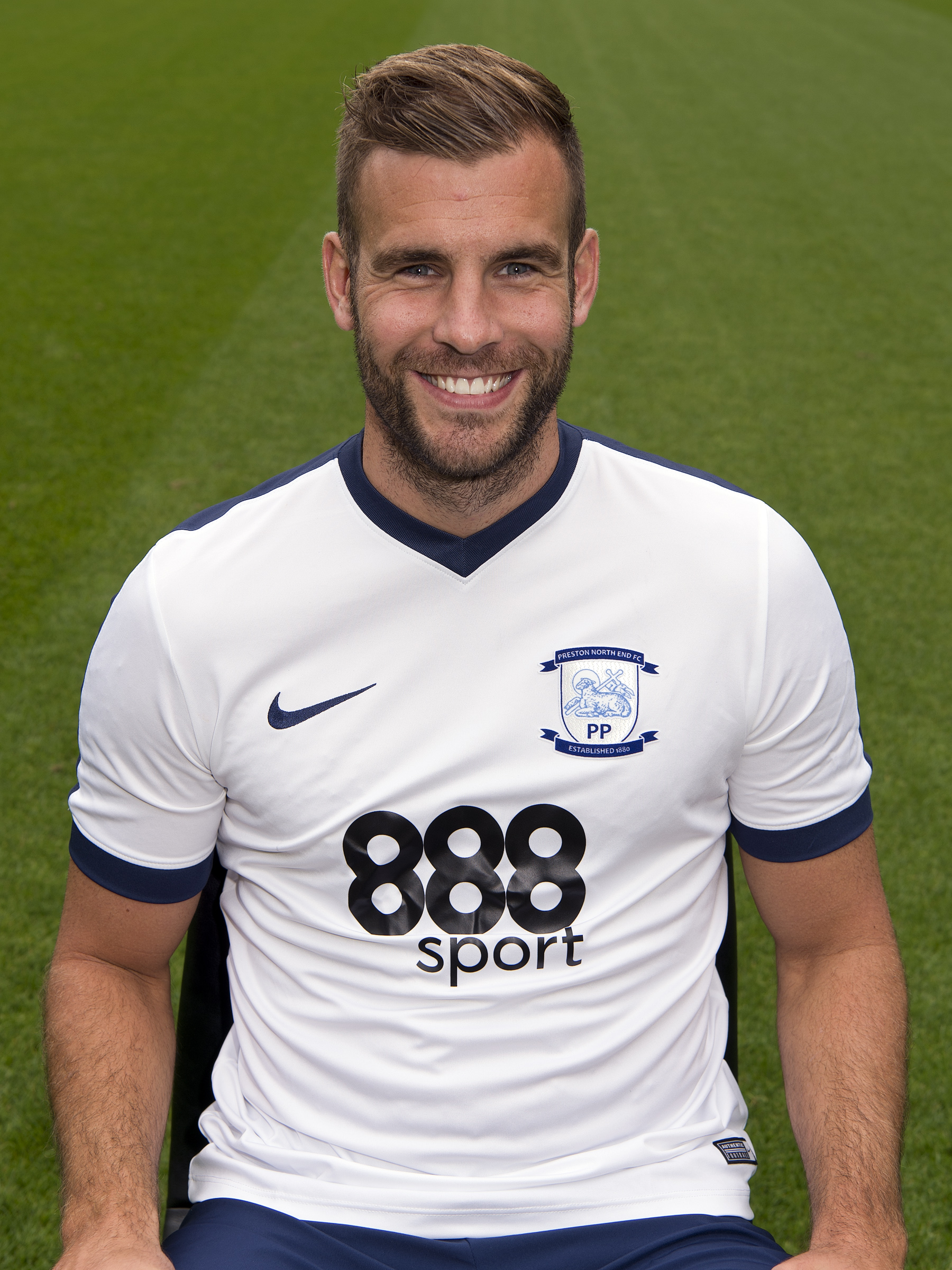
- Spurr with Preston North End in 2016

Personal information
- Full name: Thomas Spurr
- Date of birth: 30 September 1987 (age 39)
- Place of birth: Leeds, England
- Height: 6 ft 1 in (1.85 m)
- Position: Defender

Youth career
- 2004–2005: Sheffield Wednesday

Senior career*
Years	Team	Apps	(Gls)
2005–2011	Sheffield Wednesday	192	(5)
2011–2013	Doncaster Rovers	65	(1)
2013–2016	Blackburn Rovers	78	(3)
2016–2019	Preston North End	23	(1)
2018–2019	→ Fleetwood Town (loan)	4	(0)
Total		362	(10)
- * Club domestic league appearances and goals

Thomas Spurr (born 30 September 1987) is an English former professional footballer who played as a defender for Sheffield Wednesday, Doncaster Rovers, Blackburn Rovers, Preston North End and a loan spell with Fleetwood Town.

== Career ==
=== Sheffield Wednesday ===
Spurr was born in Leeds, West Yorkshire, where he played for Seacroft Colts AFC as a child. He joined Sheffield Wednesday at a young age and worked his way up through the academy before signing for them full-time in 2004 and in his first season established himself in the reserves and won a place on the bench for the first team. He was named Academy Player of the Year in the 2004–05 season and made his first team debut against Reading on 22 April 2006. He was awarded Sponsor's Man of the Match for his performance in the game.

The 2006–07 season saw Spurr hold down a regular place in the starting eleven at left back ahead of the more experienced Peter Gilbert and John Hills. In December 2006, Spurr was given a new two-and-a-half-year contract which took his contract up until the summer of 2009.

Spurr scored his first goal for Sheffield Wednesday against Charlton Athletic on 25 August 2007 in a 3–2 defeat. He scored his second career goal and first Hillsborough goal on 14 April 2008 against Plymouth Argyle. It proved to be the equaliser in what was a crunch game for Sheffield Wednesday and was voted Sky Sports Championship Goal of the Season.

In December 2007 Championship rivals Queens Park Rangers made an offer for Spurr. It was turned down, however, as he was described as a 'top asset in the playing squad.' Later in the month Queens Park Rangers made an improved offer which was also rejected by Sheffield Wednesday.

Spurr scored his third goal for Wednesday against Watford in a 2–0 win at Hillsborough on 13 September 2008. Despite playing at centre back for the game due to an injury sustained by Mark Beevers, Spurr found himself 50 yards out on the left wing and played a give and go with Etiënne Esajas, before sliding the ball right footed past Mart Poom from 8 yards.

Spurr scored another eye-catching goal from 25 yards in a 2–1 defeat against Fulham in the FA Cup 3rd Round on 3 January 2009. During the 7 February 2009 Steel City derby Spurr scored his fourth league goal for the club from a Michael Gray cross just 45 seconds into the game.

Spurr was handed the team's captaincy in the game on 21 February 2009 against Crystal Palace, in the absence of team captain Richard Wood. In September, he signed a three-year contract extension. However Sheffield Wednesday were relegated from the Championship on the final day of the season against Crystal Palace. After staying with the club in League One, Spurr found himself out of favour when manager Gary Megson took over the club.

=== Doncaster Rovers ===
In June 2011, it was reported that Sheffield Wednesday had accepted an undisclosed fee said to be around the £200,000 area from Doncaster Rovers for the services of Spurr. He signed for Doncaster Rovers on 28 June 2011. When fit, Spurr was a regular starter at left back for Doncaster.

=== Blackburn Rovers ===
Spurr's Doncaster contract expired in June 2013. Despite lengthy talks, no new contract was agreed, and only a few days before the start of the new season, he signed a two-year deal with Blackburn Rovers, replacing regular left-back Martin Olsson who had departed for Norwich City of the Premier League. He went straight into the starting eleven for Blackburn's opening-day draw at Derby County. On 10 August 2013, he started and played the full 90 minutes in a 1–0 defeat against Nottingham Forest at Ewood Park. On 7 May 2014, Spurr signed a new two-year contract with Rovers.

=== Preston North End ===
On 28 June 2016, Spurr signed a three-year deal with Preston North End on a free transfer after the expiry of his contract. He was signed as left-back, moving to centre-half for his second season at the club but an injury early in the season limited his appearances. Spurr joined Fleetwood Town on loan for the 2018–19 season. After a short spell with The Cod Army, he was sent back to Preston after suffering a serious injury.

He was released by Preston at the end of the 2018–19 season. Spurr announced his retirement from professional football due to injury on 10 June 2019.

== Career statistics ==
Appearances and goals by club, season and competition
Club	Season	League			FA Cup		League Cup		Other		Total	
Club	Season	Division	Apps	Goals	Apps	Goals	Apps	Goals	Apps	Goals	Apps	Goals
Sheffield Wednesday	2005–06	Championship	2	0	0	0	0	0	—		2	0
Sheffield Wednesday	2006–07	Championship	36	0	2	0	1	0	—		39	0
Sheffield Wednesday	2007–08	Championship	41	2	2	0	2	0	—		45	2
Sheffield Wednesday	2008–09	Championship	41	2	1	1	1	0	—		43	3
Sheffield Wednesday	2009–10	Championship	46	1	1	0	2	0	—		49	1
Sheffield Wednesday	2010–11	League One	26	0	4	1	1	0	2 (Note: Appearances in League One play-offs)	0	33	1
Sheffield Wednesday	Total		192	5	10	2	7	0	2	0	211	7
Doncaster Rovers	2011–12	Championship	19	0	0	0	2	0	—		21	0
Doncaster Rovers	2012–13	League One	46	1	2	0	3	0	1 (Note: Appearance(s) in Football League Trophy)	0	52	1
Doncaster Rovers	Total		65	1	2	0	5	0	1	0	73	1
Blackburn Rovers	2013–14	Championship	43	3	2	0	0	0	—		45	3
Blackburn Rovers	2014–15	Championship	12	0	1	0	0	0	—		13	0
Blackburn Rovers	2015–16	Championship	23	0	2	0	1	0	—		26	0
Blackburn Rovers	Total		78	3	5	0	1	0	—		84	3
Preston North End	2016–17	Championship	18	1	0	0	2	0	—		20	1
Preston North End	2017–18	Championship	5	0	0	0	0	0	0	0	5	0
Preston North End	Total		23	1	0	0	2	0	0	0	25	1
Fleetwood Town	2018–19	League One	4	0	0	0	2	0	1	0	7	0
Career total			362	10	17	2	17	0	4	0	400	12

== Honours ==
Doncaster Rovers

- Football League One: 2012–13
