= Darren Potter =

English footballer (born 1984)

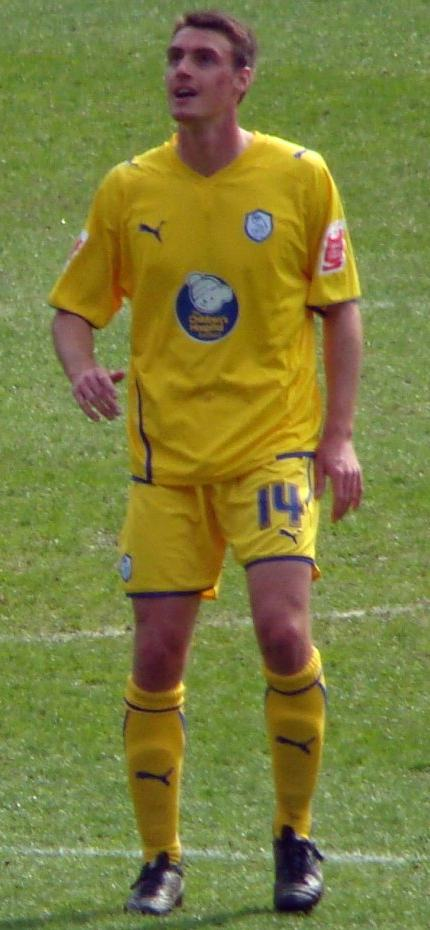
- Potter playing for Sheffield Wednesday in 2010.

Personal information
- Full name: Darren Michael Potter
- Date of birth: 21 December 1984 (age 41)
- Place of birth: Liverpool, England
- Height: 6 ft 1 in (1.85 m)
- Position: Midfielder

Youth career
- 1995–1999: Everton
- 1999–2001: Blackburn Rovers
- 2001–2003: Liverpool

Senior career*
Years	Team	Apps	(Gls)
2003–2007	Liverpool	2	(0)
2006	→ Southampton (loan)	10	(0)
2006	→ Wolverhampton Wanderers (loan)	21	(0)
2007–2009	Wolverhampton Wanderers	35	(0)
2009	→ Sheffield Wednesday (loan)	17	(2)
2009–2011	Sheffield Wednesday	79	(6)
2011–2017	Milton Keynes Dons	229	(9)
2017–2019	Rotherham United	17	(0)
2019–2020	Tranmere Rovers	12	(0)
2020	Altrincham	0	(0)
Total		422	(17)

International career
- Republic of Ireland U21
2007–2008	Republic of Ireland	5	(0)
- * Club domestic league appearances and goals

Darren Michael Potter (born 21 December 1984) is a football coach and former player who is a coach at EFL League One club Milton Keynes Dons. A midfielder, he made 502 league and cup appearances in a 16-year career in the Premier League and English Football League. Born in England, he won five caps for the Republic of Ireland.

Potter began his career at Liverpool, making his senior debut in a UEFA Champions League qualifier in August 2004 in the first of his three appearances in that season's competition, which Liverpool would eventually win. He played a total of 17 games for Liverpool. However, he featured just twice in the Premier League and spent 2006 on loan at Southampton and Wolverhampton Wanderers. He joined Wolves on a £250,000 transfer in January 2007. A first-team regular in the 2006–07 season, he lost his place the following season and spent the second half of the 2008–09 season on loan at Sheffield Wednesday before joining the club permanently for an undisclosed fee in July 2009. Wednesday were relegated out of the Championship in 2010, and Potter left the club by mutual consent in June 2011.

Potter signed with Milton Keynes Dons in June 2011 and was named the club's Player of the Year and on the PFA Team of the Year for the 2011–12 season. Promotion out of League One was secured with a second-place finish at the end of his fourth season at the club. However, they would be relegated at the end of their maiden season in the Championship. He left the club at the end of the 2016–17 season and joined Rotherham United in June 2017. He suffered an Achilles injury six months into his stay at Rotherham, which kept him out of action until the last game of the 2018–19 campaign. He spent the 2019–20 season with Tranmere Rovers and announced his retirement whilst at Altrincham in November 2020. He went on to coach at Port Vale, Stoke City and Milton Keynes Dons.

== Club career ==
=== Liverpool ===
Born in Liverpool, Potter grew up in the Scotland Road area of the city. He was released by Everton, the club he supported as a boy, at the age of 15 and spent time in the youth team at Blackburn Rovers, before being signed to Liverpool in 2001. He turned professional at Liverpool in April 2002.

He made his senior debut for the "Reds" under the stewardship of Rafael Benítez on 10 August 2004, coming on as a late substitute for Steve Finnan in a UEFA Champions League qualifier against Austrian side Grazer AK, playing the last five minutes. He started in the return fixture at Anfield 14 days later, in what ended as a 1–0 defeat though Liverpool advanced with a 2–1 aggregate victory. He made his Premier League debut on 1 February, in a 2–1 win at Charlton Athletic. He also featured in the knockout stages of the UEFA Champions League, coming on as a substitute in the round of 16 home tie against Bayer Leverkusen. Liverpool went on to beat Milan in the final, though only the matchday squad received winner's medals. In total, he made 10 appearances in the 2004–05 season.

"I am more comfortable in the middle than on the right, but you know that Steven Gerrard, the best player in Europe, Xabi Alonso and Didi Hamann are competing for those places, so it is not going to be easy playing there. But as far as I am concerned, I'd give an arm and a leg just to get a shirt in any position."

— Potter speaking in July 2005.

The following season, he was involved in pre-season friendlies and the Champions League qualifying rounds but did not feature in the Premier League. He made a brief cameo in the group stages of the Champions League, playing in the final moments of a 0–0 draw with Real Betis. On 26 January, he joined Championship side Southampton on loan for the remainder of the 2005–06 season. He provided an assist for Kenwyne Jones on his "Saints" debut, a 1–0 victory at Leicester City in the FA Cup. He made 12 appearances for George Burley's side, nine starts and three times appearing from the bench.

=== Wolverhampton Wanderers ===
On 17 August 2006, Potter returned to the Championship on loan at Wolverhampton Wanderers for the 2006–07 season. He scored his first career goal on 16 January, opening the scoring in a 2–0 victory at Oldham Athletic in the FA Cup. The loan move was made permanent for a £250,000 fee just two days later, with Potter signing a three-and-a-half-year contract. He played 44 games for Wolves during the campaign, helping the team to qualify for the play-offs, though they were eliminated at the semi-final stages by Black Country derby rivals West Bromwich Albion.

His second season with Wolves was less successful, though, and manager Mick McCarthy offered him the option of going on the transfer list during the January transfer window to seek more playing time at a new club. Potter rejected the offer and remained at Molineux for the rest of the 2007–08 season. However, the club transfer-listed him at its conclusion. After finding no takers for him during the summer transfer window, he was taken off the transfer list and told to fight for his place.

=== Sheffield Wednesday ===
He failed to appear for his parent club during the first half of the 2008–09 season. He joined Sheffield Wednesday on loan in January, remaining there until the end of the season. Potter scored for Brian Laws's "Owls" 16 minutes into his debut with a 30 yards (27 m) drive into the bottom corner in a 4–1 win over Charlton at Hillsborough on 17 January. His loan was made into a permanent deal on 10 July for an undisclosed fee.

Potter scored his first goal of the 2009–10 season on 22 August, in a 4–0 win over newly-promoted Scunthorpe United. His next goal was a left-footed curler in the bottom corner against Blackpool at Hillsborough on 9 February. Potter added to his tally for the season with a volley against Wednesday's fierce rivals Sheffield United in the Steel City derby on 19 April. Wednesday were relegated at the end of the season after new manager Alan Irvine failed to inspire an upturn in form.

The club struggled to adapt to life in League One and brought in Gary Megson as manager in February 2011. They ended the 2010–11 season in 15th-place, with Potter scoring four goals from 40 games. He also received the first red card of his career for a foul on Craig Mackail-Smith in a 5–3 defeat at Peterborough United on 1 February.

=== Milton Keynes Dons ===
On 24 June 2011, Potter signed a one-year contract for League One club Milton Keynes Dons after leaving Sheffield Wednesday by mutual consent. He was sent off on his fourth appearance for the Dons, having received two yellow cards during a 1–0 win at Yeovil Town on 16 August. He signed a new two-year contract in April 2012. He played 49 games during the 2011–12 season, scoring three goals, Dons qualified for the play-offs with a fifth-place finish. However, they were beaten 3–2 on aggregate by Huddersfield Town in the play-off semi-finals. Potter was named on the PFA Team of the Year and as Milton Keynes Dons Player of the Year and Player's Player of the Year.

The 2012–13 season would see a career-high for appearances and goals, as he scored five goals from 55 games, though the club finished two places outside the play-off places. He was limited to 37 appearances at Stadium mk during the 2013–14 campaign. On 21 February 2014, Potter signed a new two-year contract extension. The club secured promotion at the end of the 2014–15 season under the stewardship of Karl Robinson, finishing second to champions Bristol City.

In October 2015, Potter signed a new contract to keep him at the club until 2017, with the option of another 12 months. Dons lasted just one season in the Championship, being relegated after finishing 23rd in the 2015–16 season. Potter battle back from a knee injury to make 38 appearances that season, scoring once in a 5–1 home defeat to Chelsea in the FA Cup. On 24 April 2017, after six seasons, 266 appearances and 12 goals, Milton Keynes Dons announced that Potter would be leaving the club at the end of the 2016–17 season.

=== Rotherham United ===
On 14 June 2017, Potter signed a two-year contract with Rotherham United. He was rated as one of manager Paul Warne's best performers during the first half of the 2017–18 season. However, in December 2017 he suffered an Achilles injury which required two operations, and which kept him out of action until the final match of the 2018–19 season. He left the New York Stadium when his contract expired in June 2019.

=== Tranmere Rovers ===
On 28 June 2019, Potter signed a one-year contract with Micky Mellon's Tranmere Rovers. He made 15 appearances in the first half of the 2019–20 season before Tranmere were relegated into League Two after the season was ended early due to the COVID-19 pandemic in England.

=== Altrincham ===
Potter signed a short-term deal with National League club Altrincham on 22 October 2020. He played for the "Reds" in an FA Cup qualifying defeat at AFC Fylde three days later. He left the club in less than a week and later announced his retirement on 17 November to become a coach at Port Vale.

== International career ==
Potter was capped multiple times for Republic of Ireland youth teams – appearing at the 2003 FIFA World Youth Championship – and later made his debut for Ireland's senior team in a friendly against Ecuador in Giants Stadium, New York on 23 May 2007. He was given his debut by Steve Staunton and would win a total of five caps, the last one coming under the caretaker stewardship of Don Givens in a friendly defeat to Brazil at Croke Park in February 2008.

== Style of play ==
Potter was a midfielder with good tackling, leadership and ball retention skills.

== Coaching career ==
Potter left the Port Vale coaching staff to join Potteries derby rivals Stoke City as Lead Youth Development Phase Coach at the U15-U16 age bracket. In May 2025, left Stoke to become a first team coach with former club Milton Keynes Dons, reuniting with his former Rotherham United coach Paul Warne.

== Career statistics ==
=== Club statistics ===
Appearances and goals by club, season and competition
Club	Season	League			FA Cup		League Cup		Other		Total	
Club	Season	Division	Apps	Goals	Apps	Goals	Apps	Goals	Apps	Goals	Apps	Goals
Liverpool	2004–05	Premier League	2	0	1	0	4	0	3 (Note: Appearances in Champions League)	0	10	0
Liverpool	2005–06	Premier League	0	0	0	0	1	0	6	0	7	0
Liverpool	Total		2	0	1	0	5	0	9	0	17	0
Southampton (loan)	2005–06	Championship	10	0	2	0	—		—		12	0
Wolverhampton Wanderers	2006–07	Championship	38	0	3	1	1	0	2 (Note: Appearances in Championship play-offs)	0	44	1
Wolverhampton Wanderers	2007–08	Championship	18	0	3	0	2	0	—		23	0
Wolverhampton Wanderers	2008–09	Championship	0	0	0	0	0	0	—		0	0
Wolverhampton Wanderers	Total		56	0	6	1	3	0	2	0	67	1
Sheffield Wednesday (loan)	2008–09	Championship	17	2	—		—		—		17	2
Sheffield Wednesday	2009–10	Championship	46	3	1	0	2	0	—		49	3
Sheffield Wednesday	2010–11	League One	33	3	2	1	2	0	3 (Note: Appearances in Football League Trophy)	0	40	4
Sheffield Wednesday	Total		96	8	3	1	4	0	3	0	106	9
Milton Keynes Dons	2011–12	League One	40	2	3	1	3	0	3 (Note: Appearance in Football League Trophy, 2 appearances in League One play-offs)	0	49	3
Milton Keynes Dons	2012–13	League One	46	4	6	1	3	0	0	0	55	5
Milton Keynes Dons	2013–14	League One	29	0	3	0	3	0	1	0	37	0
Milton Keynes Dons	2014–15	League One	40	2	4	0	2	0	1	0	47	2
Milton Keynes Dons	2015–16	Championship	37	0	1	1	0	0	—		38	1
Milton Keynes Dons	2016–17	League One	37	1	3	0	0	0	1 (Note: Appearance(s) in the EFL Trophy)	0	41	1
Milton Keynes Dons	Total		229	9	20	3	11	0	6	0	266	12
Rotherham United	2017–18	League One	16	0	1	0	1	0	0	0	18	0
Rotherham United	2018–19	Championship	1	0	0	0	0	0	—		1	0
Rotherham United	Total		17	0	1	0	1	0	0	0	19	0
Tranmere Rovers	2019–20	League One	12	0	2	0	1	0	2	0	17	0
Altrincham	2019–20	National League	0	0	1	0	—		0	0	1	0
Career total			422	17	36	5	25	0	22	0	505	22

=== International statistics ===
Republic of Ireland national team
Year	Apps	Goals
2007	4	0
2008	1	0
Total	5	0

== Honours ==
Liverpool

- UEFA Champions League: 2004–05

Milton Keynes Dons

- Football League One runner-up: 2014–15

Individual

- PFA Team of the Year: 2011–12 League One
- Milton Keynes Dons Player of the Year: 2011–12
- Milton Keynes Dons Player's Player of the Year: 2011–12
