= Sean McAllister (footballer, born 1987) =

English footballer

Personal information
- Full name: Sean Brian McAllister
- Date of birth: 15 August 1987 (age 39)
- Place of birth: Bolton, England
- Height: 5 ft 8 in (1.73 m)
- Position: Midfielder

Youth career
- 1996–1999: Manchester United
- 1999–2003: Bolton Wanderers
- 2003–2006: Sheffield Wednesday

Senior career*
Years	Team	Apps	(Gls)
2006–2010	Sheffield Wednesday	68	(4)
2007	→ Mansfield Town (loan)	7	(0)
2007–2008	→ Bury (loan)	0	(0)
2010–2012	Shrewsbury Town	35	(1)
2012–2013	Port Vale	2	(0)
2013	Cowdenbeath	9	(0)
2013–2016	Scunthorpe United	73	(0)
2016–2018	Grimsby Town	4	(0)
2017–2018	→ York City (loan)	3	(0)
2019	Chester	10	(0)
2019–2021	Newtown	49	(1)
Total		260	(6)
- * Club domestic league appearances and goals

Sean Brian McAllister (born 15 August 1987) is an English former professional footballer who played as a midfielder who is now a coach at EFL League Two club Shrewsbury Town.

Primarily as a central midfielder, he has good vision and passing ability. He began his professional career at Sheffield Wednesday in 2006. He had spells on loan at Mansfield Town and Bury, before establishing himself in the Wednesday first-team in the 2008–09 season. He was allowed to join Shrewsbury Town in July 2010 and helped them to win promotion out of League Two in 2011–12. He joined Port Vale on a short-term contract in November 2012. Then he signed with Cowdenbeath in March 2013 before joining Scunthorpe United four months later. He helped Scunthorpe to win promotion out of League Two in 2013–14. He signed with Grimsby Town in June 2016 and had a loan spell with York City from December 2017 to January 2018. He joined Chester in January 2019 and then moved on to Newtown eight months later. He retired in July 2021. He went on to coach at former club Shrewsbury Town.

== Career ==
=== Early career ===
McAllister was born in Bolton, Greater Manchester. He started playing at Deans Sports in Swinton before going on a successful trial at Manchester United at the age of nine. He spent three years as a schoolboy at Old Trafford before joining Bolton Wanderers, where he stayed for four years.

=== Sheffield Wednesday ===
He switched to the Sheffield Wednesday Academy in 2003. Having previously been an unused substitute in the Steel City derby at Hillsborough, McAllister made his first-team debut for Sheffield Wednesday in the Championship the following week on 25 February 2006, coming on as a substitute after 56 minutes when Wednesday were already 3–0 down to Southampton at St Mary's. He did not appear in the first-team again until the end-of-season, when he played all 90 minutes of a 2–0 victory against Derby County at Pride Park. He was named as the club's Young Player of the Year for the 2005–06 season.

On 19 August 2006, McAllister scored his first senior goal to inspire a Wednesday comeback, as they went on to beat Plymouth Argyle 2–1 at Home Park following his 52nd-minute equaliser. He collected the ball from Burton O'Brien's cross and shot into the top corner of the goal. He would rarely feature in the rest of the 2006–07 season, only making one substitute appearance under Paul Sturrock's successor Brian Laws. Despite this, he signed a new contract in May 2007.

After failing to feature for the first team during the start of the 2007–08 season, he was sent out on a one-month loan to League Two club Mansfield Town in September 2007. He made four league starts, and manager Bill Dearden had the loan deal extended to cover a second month. However, he then lost his first-team place at Field Mill, and returned to Wednesday. He then joined Chris Casper's Bury on loan in November 2007, and remained at Gigg Lane for two months without making a first-team appearance. He was recalled by Wednesday as a back-up early into his second month with Bury. He went on to break into the first-team again in February 2008, but missed the end-of-season run-in with a calf injury.

He signed a two-year contract extension in May 2008. He became a first-team regular in the 2008–09 season, making 42 appearances and claiming three league goals against Preston North End, Crystal Palace, and Reading. However, he lost his first-team spot in September 2009, and later struggled with a stomach injury. He was released by new manager Alan Irvine at the end of the 2009–10 season, after he was limited to 14 appearances throughout the season.

=== Shrewsbury Town ===
McAllister signed a two-year contract with Shrewsbury Town in July 2010. Manager Graham Turner stated that "McAllister's an attacking, exciting player and I'm a bit surprised he was still on the market. We were a little short in midfield and with his Championship experience he could be a real gain for us." He made his first appearance at the New Meadow as a 77th-minute substitute in a 3–1 victory over Bradford City on 7 August 2010. He was named as Shrewsbury's Player of the Month for August 2010, but found first-team opportunities harder to come by in the second half of the season due to a hernia injury and the arrival of new signings Nicky Wroe and David Davies. He had an operation to correct the hernia injury in February 2011.

McAllister returned to fitness during the 2011–12 pre-season, scoring against a Manchester United XI in a 2–1 home victory in July 2011. He scored his first competitive goal for Shrewsbury when he was recalled to the starting line-up in a 2–0 win over Crewe Alexandra on 20 August. His goal came in the 23rd minute with a glancing header from Lionel Ainsworth's cross. However, the form of Matt Richards and loan signing David McAllister again left him sitting on the sidelines for much of the season. Shrewsbury won promotion to League One as runners-up of League Two, although McAllister was not offered a new contract. He said that "Hopefully my experience at a higher level, and the fact that I've got a promotion under my belt, will help my cause. I'm disappointed, I thought I was worth a new deal, but I've had two good years at Shrewsbury."

=== Port Vale ===
McAllister failed to find a club before the start of the 2012–13 season, despite a trial at Oxford United. In October 2012, he went on trial at Port Vale, after personally ringing manager Micky Adams to enquire about a vacancy in midfield created when Doug Loft picked up an injury. He signed an eight-week contract with Vale on 9 November. The League Two club were in administration, and applied for special permission to sign McAllister after asking the Football League for leniency after they underwent a shortage of available midfielders. He made his debut from the bench at Vale Park on 17 November, replacing Rob Taylor 74 minutes into a 2–2 draw with York City. However, he would only feature twice more for Vale, and left the club on 8 January 2013.

=== Cowdenbeath ===
McAllister joined Scottish First Division club Cowdenbeath in March 2013. He made nine appearances at the end of the 2012–13 season, helping the club to avoid relegation.

=== Scunthorpe United ===
On 19 July 2013, McAllister made a return to League Two when he signed a one-year contract with Scunthorpe United. He made 43 appearances in the 2013–14 season as Scunthorpe won promotion as divisional runners-up, and was also crowned the club's Player of the Year for his "high energy and consistent performances".

He signed a new two-year contract in May 2014. However, after Mark Robins replaced Russ Wilcox as manager, McAllister found first-team football hard to come by in the second half of the 2014–15 season. He made 15 appearances across the 2015–16 season, and was released at the end of the season.

=== Grimsby Town ===
On 23 June 2016, McAllister signed a two-year contract with newly promoted League Two club Grimsby Town on a free transfer. However, he played just four matches throughout the 2016–17 season as he struggled with what was said to be a recurring groin injury. However, he later discovered that he had been misdiagnosed and was suffering from an ankle-related problem.

McAllister joined National League North club York City on 8 December 2017 on a one-month loan. He made his debut on 16 December 2017, when starting in a 2–1 away defeat to Kidderminster Harriers in the FA Trophy first round. He finished the loan with four appearances. He was released by Grimsby at the end of the 2017–18 season after making just six appearances in two years.

=== Chester ===
On 11 January 2019, McAllister joined National League North side Chester. He was signed to form a central midfield partnership with Gary Roberts as Gary Stopforth was ruled out with injury. Manager Bernard Morley praised McAllister for an assured performance in his "Seals" debut appearance against Guiseley.

=== Newtown ===
On 9 August 2019, McAllister joined Cymru Premier side Newtown. He made 26 appearances in the 2019–20 campaign, which was curtailed early due to the COVID-19 pandemic in Wales, and signed a new contract in June. He featured 26 times in the 2020–21 campaign and was an unused substitute as Newtown beat Caernarfon Town in the play-off final to secure qualification into the newly created UEFA Europa Conference League. He announced his retirement in July 2021.

== Style of play ==
In describing his playing style, McAllister said that "I work hard and I read the game well... [and] I like to get forward".

== Coaching career ==
McAllister was working as a youth team coach at Shrewsbury Town by 2026.

== Career statistics ==
Appearances and goals by club, season and competition
Club	Season	League			National cup (Note: Includes FA Cup, Scottish Cup, Welsh Cup)		League cup (Note: Includes Football League Cup, Scottish League Cup, Welsh League Cup)		Other		Total	
Club	Season	Division	Apps	Goals	Apps	Goals	Apps	Goals	Apps	Goals	Apps	Goals
Sheffield Wednesday	2005–06	Championship	2	0	0	0	0	0	—		2	0
Sheffield Wednesday	2006–07	Championship	6	1	0	0	1	0	—		7	1
Sheffield Wednesday	2007–08	Championship	8	0	0	0	0	0	—		8	0
Sheffield Wednesday	2008–09	Championship	40	3	1	0	1	0	—		42	3
Sheffield Wednesday	2009–10	Championship	12	0	0	0	2	0	—		14	0
Sheffield Wednesday	Total		68	4	1	0	4	0	—		73	4
Mansfield Town (loan)	2007–08	League Two	7	0	—		—		—		7	0
Bury (loan)	2007–08	League Two	0	0	0	0	—		0	0	0	0
Shrewsbury Town	2010–11	League Two	18	0	1	0	2	0	2 (Note: Appearance(s) in Football League Trophy)	0	23	0
Shrewsbury Town	2011–12	League Two	17	1	2	0	2	0	1	0	22	1
Shrewsbury Town	Total		35	1	3	0	4	0	3	0	45	1
Port Vale	2012–13	League Two	2	0	0	0	—		1	0	3	0
Cowdenbeath	2012–13	Scottish First Division	9	0	—		—		—		9	0
Scunthorpe United	2013–14	League Two	39	0	2	0	1	0	1	0	43	0
Scunthorpe United	2014–15	League One	23	0	4	0	2	0	2	1	31	1
Scunthorpe United	2015–16	League One	11	0	2	0	1	0	1	0	15	0
Scunthorpe United	Total		73	0	8	0	4	0	4	1	89	1
Grimsby Town	2016–17	League Two	3	0	0	0	1	0	0	0	4	0
Grimsby Town	2017–18	League Two	1	0	0	0	0	0	1 (Note: Appearance in EFL Trophy)	0	2	0
Grimsby Town	Total		4	0	0	0	1	0	1	0	6	0
York City (loan)	2017–18	National League North	3	0	—		—		1 (Note: Appearance in FA Trophy)	0	4	0
Chester	2018–19	National League North	10	0	—		—		0	0	10	0
Newtown	2019–20	Cymru Premier	23	1	2	0	1	0	0	0	26	1
Newtown	2020–21	Cymru Premier	26	0	0	0	0	0	1 (Note: Appearance in play-offs)	0	27	0
Newtown	Total		49	1	2	0	1	0	1	0	53	1
Career total			260	6	14	0	14	0	11	1	299	7

== Honours ==
Shrewsbury Town

- Football League Two second-place promotion: 2011–12

Scunthorpe United

- Football League Two second-place promotion: 2013–14

Individual

- Sheffield Wednesday Young Player of the Year: 2005–06
- Scunthorpe United Player of the Year: 2013–14
