= Nathan Modest =

English footballer (born 1991)

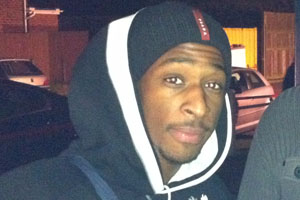
- Modest in 2011

Personal information
- Full name: Nathan Daniel Modest
- Date of birth: 29 September 1991 (age 35)
- Place of birth: Sheffield, England
- Positions: Striker; winger

Team information
- Current team: Sheffield

Youth career
- 2005–2008: Sheffield Wednesday

Senior career*
Years	Team	Apps	(Gls)
2008–2011	Sheffield Wednesday	4	(0)
2011	→ Darlington (loan)	13	(0)
2011–2012	Sheffield		
2012–2013	Worksop Town		
2013	→ Rainworth Miners Welfare (loan)		
2013–2014	Lincoln United	15	(0)
2014–2015	Gloucester City	24	(4)
2015–2016	Hednesford Town	9	(5)
2016–2017	AFC Telford United	1	(0)
2017–2018	Rainworth Miners Welfare	25	(16)
2018–2019	Bridlington Town	33	(20)
2019	Mickleover	13	(1)
2020	Pontefract Collieries	8	(3)
2021	Grantham Town	12	(1)
2021–	Sheffield	78	(17)
- * Club domestic league appearances and goals as of 10:23, 14 July 2019 (UTC)

Nathan Daniel Modest (born 29 September 1991) is an English footballer who plays as a striker and winger for Sheffield in the Northern Premier League Division One East.

Modest made his Football League debut at the age of 17 when he played in the Championship for Sheffield Wednesday; he made three further appearances between 2008 and 2011, before later playing for Darlington, Sheffield, Worksop Town and Rainworth Miners Welfare.

== Career ==
=== Sheffield Wednesday and early loan moves ===
He graduated through the Sheffield Wednesday Academy and reserve teams, making his first team debut on 20 December 2008, aged 17 years and 82 days. He has also played for the England Schoolboy team. Modest was called up to the Sheffield Wednesday first team squad for the home match against Bristol City on 13 December 2008 as the team suffered an injury crisis. He was a non-playing substitute for the eventual goalless draw. However, Modest went on to make his debut for Sheffield Wednesday a week later on 20 December, when he started in the 2–0 loss away to Cardiff City. Modest was then a second-half substitute in the home game versus Blackpool on 26 December 2008.

On 14 January 2011 it was announced that Modest was to join Conference side Darlington on loan until the end of the season.

=== First stint at Sheffield ===
On 18 October 2011 it was announced that Modest had left Sheffield Wednesday by mutual consent, having not played for the club for nearly three years and being unable to play in the Sheffield Wednesday Academy, due to being above age. A week later, Modest signed for Sheffield FC.

Due to fitness levels, Modest did not make his debut until 10 December later that year. The game was away to Romulus, in which Modest scored on his debut to equalise and gain Sheffield a 1–1 draw. This was his first career goal, aged 20, after a total 17 career appearances.

At the end of his first season with Sheffield he had helped the club to reach the play-offs in the Northern Premier League Division One South after making 21 appearances and scoring six goals. There, they lost 7–0 to Ilkeston, with Modest making a substitute appearance.

=== Worksop Town ===
After one season with Sheffield, Modest joined another local north Nottinghamshire side, Worksop Town. He made his debut for Worksop Town later that day in a 4–0 win over Hednesford Town. Used as a winger for the team due to his pace, in Modest's first season with Worksop Town he played fourteen games for the club, twelve of which were league appearances.

=== Rainworth Miners Welfare loan and Lincoln United ===
At the beginning of the 2013–14 season, Modest was sent on loan to Rainworth Miners Welfare. He scored on his competitive debut for Rainworth against Loughborough Dynamo, as his new team won 3–2. He then signed for Lincoln United in September 2013, where he made fifteen league appearances and contributed three assists, but did not score a goal.

=== Gloucester City ===
In September 2014, after impressing on trial, he signed for Gloucester City.

=== Return to Rainworth Miners Welfare ===
Modest signed for Rainworth Miners Welfare FC for the 2017/18 season, after returning to the city of Sheffield following three years of study at Hartpury University. In his debut season for Rainworth he scored 16 goals in league and cup.

=== Bridlington Town ===
Following a successful campaign at Rainworth, Modest signed for Bridlington Town, who at this time were managed by the former Sheffield United player Curtis Woodhouse. Playing as a striker, Modest enjoyed a productive season, scoring 20 goals for the club.

=== Mickleover ===
In 2019, he moved on to Mickleover in the Northern Premier League, where he made thirteen league appearances, scoring one goal, but did not play for the club after December 2019.

=== Pontefract Collieries ===
At the beginning of the following season, he joined Pontefract Collieries, and there he played in eight league matches, scoring three goals, before the season was curtailed due to the COVID-19 pandemic.

=== Grantham Town ===
In July 2021, Modest joined Grantham Town; there, he made twelve league appearances, scoring once, before departing in December to return to Sheffield.

=== Return to Sheffield ===
His second spell at Sheffield began well, as he scored six goals in twenty league appearances during the 2021–22 season, and he built on this with seven goals in 31 appearances the following campaign. He remained a regular fixture in the first-team throughout the 2023-24 season.

== Style of play ==
Modest has been described as a quick attacking player who has an eye for goal.

== Personal life ==
Away from football, he has represented South Yorkshire in athletics, achieving a time of 12.1 seconds at 100m during competition. He attended Notre Dame High School, Sheffield.
