= Marcus Tudgay =

English footballer (born 1983)

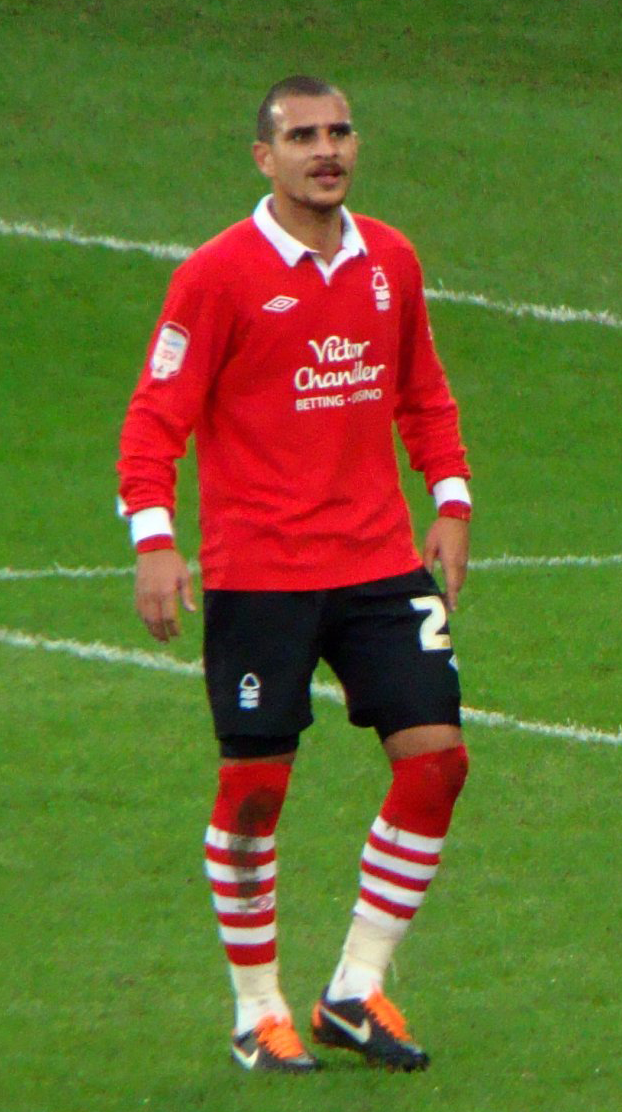
- Tudgay playing for Nottingham Forest in 2011

Personal information
- Full name: Marcus Tudgay
- Date of birth: 3 February 1983 (age 43)
- Place of birth: Worthing, England
- Height: 5 ft 9 in (1.75 m)
- Position: Forward

Youth career
- –2002: Derby County

Senior career*
Years	Team	Apps	(Gls)
2002–2006	Derby County	92	(17)
2006	→ Sheffield Wednesday (loan)	1	(1)
2006–2011	Sheffield Wednesday	194	(48)
2010–2011	→ Nottingham Forest (loan)	4	(3)
2011–2014	Nottingham Forest	57	(10)
2012–2013	→ Barnsley (loan)	9	(3)
2013–2014	→ Barnsley (loan)	5	(1)
2014	→ Charlton Athletic (loan)	2	(0)
2014–2017	Coventry City	75	(12)
2017	Sutton Coldfield Town		
2017–2018	South Normanton Athletic	29	(23)
- * Club domestic league appearances and goals as of 22:29, 28 March 2020 (UTC)

Marcus Tudgay (born 3 February 1983) is a former English professional footballer who played as a forward. He played in the English Football League for Derby County, Sheffield Wednesday, Nottingham Forest, Barnsley, Charlton Athletic and Coventry City, followed by a brief stint in non league English football.

== Club career ==
=== Derby County ===
Tudgay was born in Worthing, West Sussex. He came through the ranks at Derby County and made his senior debut in August 2002. His final Rams goal came against future club Sheffield Wednesday at Hillsborough in November 2005.

=== Sheffield Wednesday ===
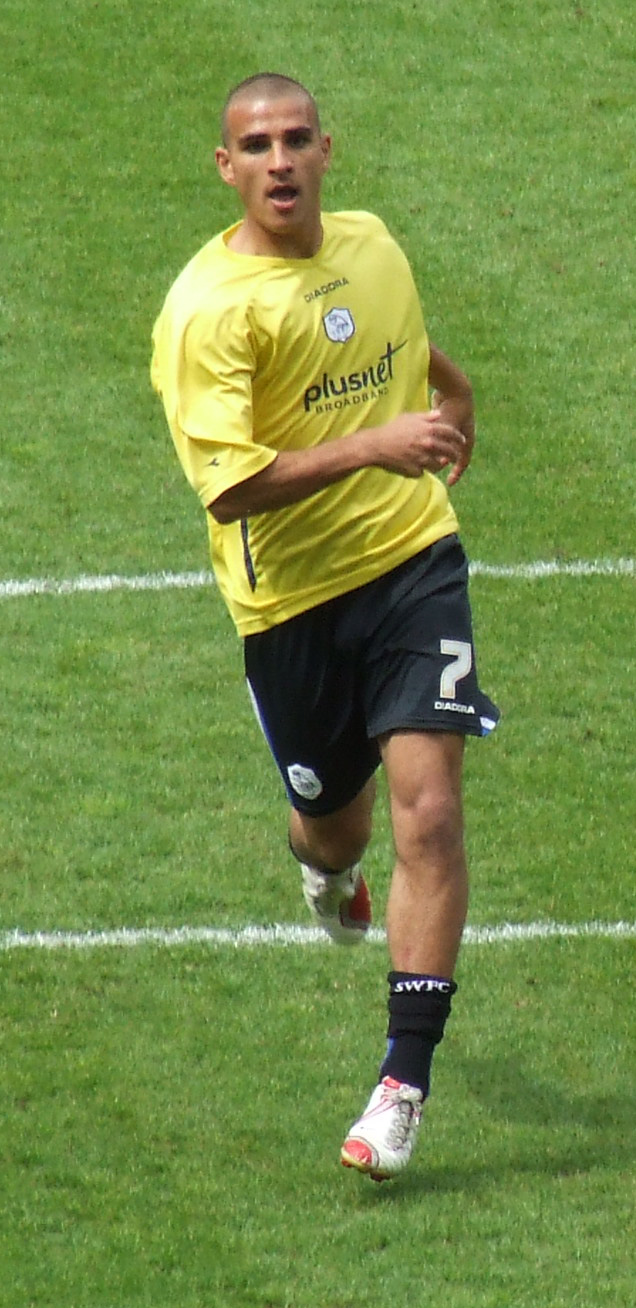
Tudgay training with Sheffield Wednesday in 2007

Tudgay joined Sheffield Wednesday for an undisclosed fee in January 2006, penning a contract to keep him at Hillsborough until 2010. He had initially signed on loan with the club but manager Paul Sturrock decided to make his move permanent after he scored a debut goal in a 3–0 win over Crewe Alexandra.

The manager's faith in him was justified as Tudgay scored vital goals in Sheffield Wednesday's successful attempt to avoid relegation from the Championship, including a goal against his former employers on the last day of the season in a 2–0 win.

Tudgay was ruled out for the start of the 2006–07 campaign due to a bizarre injury sustained at a family barbecue over the summer. The player cut his toe on glass, severing tendons and requiring surgery which ruled him out of competitive action for three months. But he bounced back on his return, forming a good partnership with Deon Burton, to score six goals in five games. He was moved out to the wing after injuries to Wade Small and Jermaine Johnson but still finished the season with 11 goals. The 2007–08 season saw Tudgay add eight goals to his career record, the most notable of these was a second half volley to lead his team to a 2–0 victory in the Steel City derby at Hillsborough and another goal against Derby County in the FA Cup which helped to earn his team a replay. He missed the end of the season due to an injury.

At the start of the 2008–09 season Tudgay scored twice in the opening game against Burnley, the first coming within 30 seconds of kick off. He played in almost every position during the season. He won the Fans player of the month awards for February and March 2009 and the PFA Fans Championship Player of the Year award, as well as the Sheffield Wednesday Player of the Year.

On 15 July 2009 it was reported that the Owls had rejected an offer from newly promoted Premier League club Burnley, describing the bid as unwelcome. Later that month he signed a new four-year contract until the summer of 2013.

On 25 August 2010 it was reported that newly promoted Premier League club Blackpool had tried to sign Tudgay the previous month and were about to make an improved offer for him. Sky Sports reported that Blackpool manager Ian Holloway had watched Tudgay in action the previous night. Two days later, the Yorkshire club rejected at £500,000 bid from Blackpool, calling the sum "derisory".

At the end of his five-year stint with Sheffield Wednesday, he was one of the only two players to score over 50 goals for the club since the turn of the millennium. He was a fan favorite and is regarded as the club's best January signing. He played over 200 matches including 195 league matches for the Owls.

=== Nottingham Forest ===
On 25 November 2010, Tudgay moved to Nottingham Forest on loan, with a view to a permanent deal in January 2011. He scored on his Forest debut in a 3–0 win against Crystal Palace on 18 December 2010 at the City Ground. In his next appearance for Nottingham Forest, he scored a brace in Forest's 5–2 victory over their East Midlands rivals Derby County. On 5 January 2011, the loan deal was made permanent and he signed for Forest for an undisclosed fee. He scored the winner against Portsmouth in a 2–1 victory for Forest. Tudgay's next goal came on 5 February against Watford, and it again proved decisive. He then did not score until April, when he opened the scoring in a 3–2 win against Leicester City. His final goal of the 2010–11 season came on the final day of the regular season, in a 3–0 win over Crystal Palace.

Tudgay's first league goal in the 2011–12 season came in a 2–0 win against Middlesbrough on 18 October 2011. His second league goal of the season was the only goal of the game against Reading on 1 November. His next goal came in the 3–2 win at home Ipswich Town on 19 November. Tudgay scored two in the return fixture as Forest beat Ipswich 3–1 on 2 January 2012. They were Tudgay's last goals of the season.

After making an appearance and scoring a goal for Forest's reserves on 13 November 2012, on the next day, Tudgay signed for Barnsley on loan until January with a view to a permanent deal. His first goal for Barnsley was the equaliser in a 1–1 draw with Burnley on 27 November 2012. His second goal for Barnsley came in a 4–1 away defeat at Watford on 1 December. His third goal for the club was the winner in a 2–1 win at Millwall.

On 28 November 2013, Tudgay re-joined Barnsley for his second loan spell at the club.

On 21 February 2014, Tudgay joined Charlton Athletic on loan for the remainder of the 2013–14 season. On 27 March 2014, the loan was cut short and he returned to Nottingham Forest.

=== Coventry City ===
Tudgay joined Coventry City on a one-year deal on 29 July 2014. He scored his first goal for the club in a 2–0 win against Walsall on 3 January 2015. He helped ensure Coventry's survival in League One by scoring in a 2–1 win against Crawley on the final day of the 2014–15 season.

After scoring 4 goals in 23 appearances in his first season to help the club avoid relegation he signed another one-year deal for the 2015–16 season.

In his second season with the club he scored 5 goals in all competitions. He then signed a third one-year deal with the club for the 2016–17 season. He came on as a late substitute as Coventry won the 2017 EFL Trophy Final.

Following Coventry's relegation in 2016–17, Tudgay was released by the club. He then had spells in non-League with Sutton Coldfield Town and South Normanton Athletic.

== Career statistics ==
As of end of 2016–17 season

Appearances and goals by club, season and competition
Club	Season	League			FA Cup		League Cup		Other		Total	
Club	Season	Division	Apps	Goals	Apps	Goals	Apps	Goals	Apps	Goals	Apps	Goals
Derby County	2002–03	First Division	8	0	1	0	0	0	—		9	0
Derby County	2003–04	First Division	29	6	1	0	0	0	—		30	6
Derby County	2004–05	Championship	34	9	3	1	1	0	0	0	38	10
Derby County	2005–06	Championship	21	2	—		1	0	—		22	2
Derby County	Total		92	17	5	1	2	0	0	0	99	18
Sheffield Wednesday	2005–06	Championship	18	5	1	0	—		—		19	5
Sheffield Wednesday	2006–07	Championship	40	11	2	0	0	0	—		42	11
Sheffield Wednesday	2007–08	Championship	35	7	2	1	3	0	—		40	8
Sheffield Wednesday	2008–09	Championship	42	14	0	0	0	0	—		42	14
Sheffield Wednesday	2009–10	Championship	43	10	1	0	2	0	—		46	10
Sheffield Wednesday	2010–11	League One	17	2	1	0	1	1	3 (Note: Appearance(s) in Football League Trophy)	1	22	4
Sheffield Wednesday	Total		195	49	7	1	6	1	3	1	211	52
Nottingham Forest	2010–11	Championship	22	7	—		—		2 (Note: Appearances in Championship play-offs)	0	24	7
Nottingham Forest	2011–12	Championship	34	5	1	0	3	1	—		38	6
Nottingham Forest	2012–13	Championship	3	0	0	0	1	0	—		4	0
Nottingham Forest	2013–14	Championship	2	1	0	0	0	0	—		2	1
Nottingham Forest	Total		61	13	1	0	4	1	2	0	68	14
Barnsley (loan)	2012–13	Championship	9	3	—		—		—		9	3
Barnsley (loan)	2013–14	Championship	5	1	—		—		—		5	1
Barnsley (loan)	Total		14	4	—		—		—		14	4
Charlton Athletic (loan)	2013–14	Championship	2	0	1	0	—		—		3	0
Coventry City	2014–15	League One	22	4	1	0	0	0	0	0	23	4
Coventry City	2015–16	League One	25	4	0	0	1	1	1	0	27	5
Coventry City	2016–17	League One	28	4	0	0	1	0	6 (Note: Appearances in EFL Trophy)	0	35	4
Coventry City	Total		75	12	1	0	2	1	7	0	85	13
South Normanton Athletic	2017-18	The Capelli Sport MFL Premier Division	29	23	—		—		—		29	23
South Normanton Athletic	Total		29	23	—		—		—		29	23

== Honours ==
Coventry City

- EFL Trophy: 2016–17

Individual

- PFA Fans' Player of the Year: 2008–09 Championship
- PFA Championship Fans' Player of the Month: February 2009, March 2009
- Sheffield Wednesday Player of the Year: 2008–09
