= Bartosz Ślusarski =

Polish footballer (born 1981)

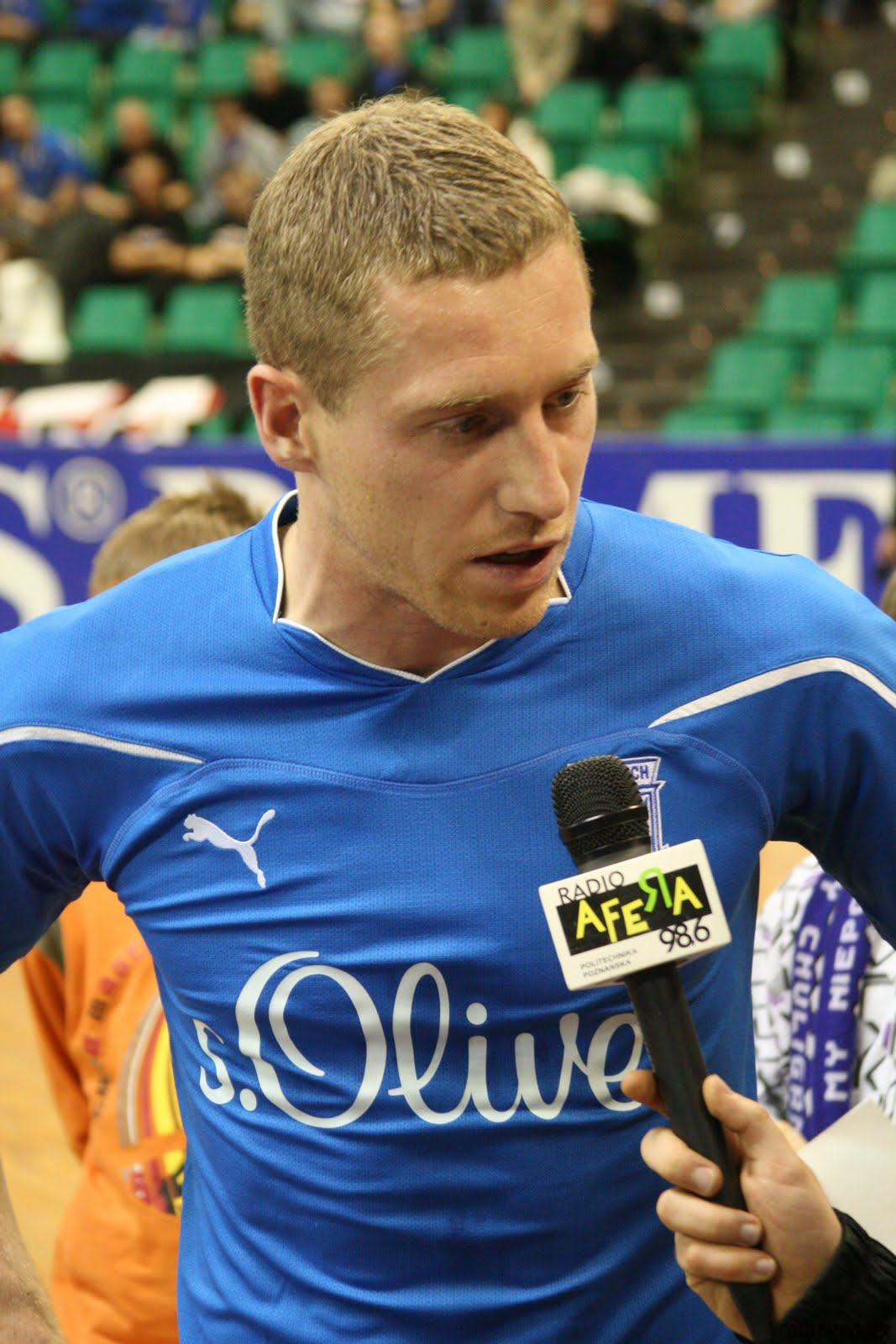
- Ślusarski with Lech Poznań in 2011

Personal information
- Full name: Bartosz Ślusarski
- Date of birth: 11 December 1981 (age 44)
- Place of birth: Szamocin, Poland
- Height: 1.86 m (6 ft 1 in)
- Position: Striker

Team information
- Current team: Poznań FC
- Number: 81

Senior career*
| Years | Team | Apps | (Gls) |
| 2000–2003 | Lech Poznań | 91 | (19) |
| 2002 | → Widzew Łódź (loan) | 8 | (2) |
| 2004–2007 | Dyskobolia Grodzisk | 59 | (20) |
| 2006–2007 | → U.D. Leiria (loan) | 24 | (7) |
| 2007–2009 | West Bromwich Albion | 1 | (0) |
| 2007–2008 | → Blackpool (loan) | 6 | (1) |
| 2008 | → Sheffield Wednesday (loan) | 7 | (1) |
| 2008 | → Sheffield Wednesday (loan) | 7 | (1) |
| 2009–2010 | Cracovia | 37 | (8) |
| 2010–2013 | Lech Poznań | 65 | (15) |
| 2013 | Lech Poznań II | 1 | (0) |
| 2013–2014 | Arka Gdynia | 15 | (5) |
| 2014–2015 | GKS Bełchatów | 22 | (5) |
| 2015–2016 | Miedź Legnica | 18 | (2) |
| 2016–2018 | Tarnovia Tarnowo Podgórne | 75 | (29) |
| 2025– | Poznań FC | 17 | (9) |

International career
| | Poland U21 | 12 | (3) |
| 2005 | Poland | 2 | (0) |
- * Club domestic league appearances and goals as of 22:32, 30 June 2026 (UTC)

Bartosz Ślusarski (Polish pronunciation: [ˈbartɔʂ ɕluˈsarski]; born 11 December 1981) is a Polish professional footballer who plays as a striker for Klasa A club Poznań FC.

== Career ==
Ślusarski joined Dyskobolia Grodzisk Wielkopolski in early 2004 as a replacement for Grzegorz Rasiak who had refused to sign a new contract. He spent the 2006–07 season on loan at UD Leiria in the Portuguese top flight, helping them qualify for the Intertoto Cup and winning their Player of the Year award. On 24 August 2007, he signed a two-year deal with West Bromwich Albion; the Baggies paid Dyskobolia £680,000 for Ślusarski's services. Ślusarski made his only Albion appearance on 20 October 2007, coming on as a late substitute in a 3–2 defeat at Colchester United.

On 20 November 2007, Ślusarski signed on loan with Blackpool until January 2008. A week later, in his second game for Blackpool, he scored his first goal in English football, although Blackpool lost 3–1 at home to Norwich City. On 3 January 2008, Blackpool extended Ślusarski's loan period until 28 January, and West Brom granted permission for him to play for Blackpool in their upcoming FA Cup match at Barnsley.

On 27 March 2008, he joined Sheffield Wednesday on loan for the rest of the season. At the time of his loan move, Ślusarski had made 12 appearances for the Poland under-21 team and had also won two caps for the senior team. He scored his first goal for Sheffield Wednesday on 26 April 2008 in his second start for the club, contributing to a crucial win in their battle against relegation.

On 27 November 2008, Ślusarski re-joined Sheffield Wednesday on loan in an initial one-month deal, with a view to a permanent transfer in January. He scored his first goal of that loan spell against his former loan club, Blackpool, in a 1–1 draw at Hillsborough on Boxing Day. On 10 January 2009, his contract at West Brom was cancelled by mutual consent and he returned to Poland, to sign for Cracovia.

On 22 December 2010, it became official that he would return to Lech Poznań.

== Honours ==
Lech Poznań

- Polish Cup: 2003–04

West Bromwich Albion

- Football League Championship: 2007–08

Individual

- Polish Cup top scorer: 2010–11
