= Etiënne Esajas =

Dutch footballer

Personal information
- Full name: Etiënne Esajas
- Date of birth: 4 November 1984 (age 41)
- Place of birth: Amsterdam, Netherlands
- Height: 1.71 m (5 ft 7 in)
- Position: Winger

Youth career
- SV Bijlmer
- 1993–2005: Ajax

Senior career*
Years	Team	Apps	(Gls)
2005–2007	Vitesse	36	(7)
2007–2010	Sheffield Wednesday	60	(5)
2010–2011	Helmond Sport	9	(3)
2011–2012	Swindon Town	6	(0)
2013–2014	Scunthorpe United	13	(2)
2015	Dayton Dutch Lions	7	(2)
Total		131	(19)
- * Club domestic league appearances and goals

Etiënne Esajas (born 4 November 1984) is a Dutch former footballer. Esajas was a winger who was born in Amsterdam and made his debut in professional football, being part of the Vitesse Arnhem squad in the 2005–06 season.

== Club career ==
=== Sheffield Wednesday ===
Esajas signed a three-year deal at Hillsborough and wore squad number 11. He was signed as a replacement for Chris Brunt who left at the beginning of August 2007 in a £3.5 million move to West Bromwich Albion. He made his Owls debut as a 55th-minute substitute for Burton O'Brien in the 1–0 defeat to Bristol City. He performed well on his debut and almost scored an equaliser in the 88th minute but had his free kick saved by Adriano Basso. His performance earned him a starting place for the next game, the 1–0 defeat to Preston North End.

On 11 September 2007, Esajas scored twice in a 5–1 away victory for SWFC reserves at Grimsby Town. A bright start to his first season in England saw him voted player of the month by fans of Sheffield Wednesday, however much of Esajas' first season at Hillsborough was hit by injury and he only made 6 starts and 13 substitute appearances in all competitions.

Esajas did not start Wednesday's first league game of the 2008–09 season, but instead had to settle for a start against Rotherham United in the League Cup on 12 August 2008. It turned out to be a game of mixed emotions for Esajas; he scored his first two goals for Sheffield Wednesday in spectacular fashion – he opened the scoring with a swerving drive from 20 yards after beating two defenders in the 14th minute, and thought he had put his side through to the next round with a 25-yard curling free kick in the 117th minute. However the game went to penalties at 2–2 after extra time, and Esajas saw his kick hit the outside of the post in front of the Hillsborough Kop end. Esajas was the only player to miss from the spot, and the Owls lost 5–3.

He kept his starting position for the next two games against Wolverhampton Wanderers and Preston North End. He had a high quality first 45 minutes at Wolves, including a 20-yard opener for the Owls, before being taken off at half time with a tight hamstring. The performance led to him being included in the Championship team of the week and eventually he gained his second Sheffield Wednesday Player of the Month award.

Esajas finished the 2008/2009 season with the most goal assists for The Owls, despite missing a large portion of the season with injury.

Esajas made an impact as a substitute against local rivals Sheffield United, scoring a free kick from 30 yards, which won the club's goal of the season award and also having a part in the first goal for The Owls.

At the end of the 2009/2010 season his contract expired with The Owls and it was not renewed by new manager Alan Irvine. He had trials at both Charlton Athletic and Scottish champions Rangers. After having a disappointing trial with RC Genk too, he finally signed a contract with Helmond Sport in October 2010 until the end of the season.

=== Swindon Town ===
On 11 July 2011 Esajas joined up with the Swindon Town squad in Norcia, Italy where he took part in a trial, Esajas was signed to a 2-year contract with Swindon on 25 July 2011. His Swindon Town contract was cancelled by mutual consent on 24 May 2012.

=== Scunthorpe United ===
After missing a whole season out of the professional game, he signed for Scunthorpe United on 16 July 2013 after a successful trial period on a one-year contract, reuniting with his former Sheffield Wednesday manager Brian Laws. He left Scunthorpe after the expiry of that contract.

He was snapped up by Premier Development League side Dayton Dutch Lions for the 2015 season. It has been rumoured that Esajas was to trial with Blackpool during pre-season 2017–18
