= 2011–12 Sheffield Wednesday F.C. season =

English football club season

Sheffield Wednesday
2011–12 season
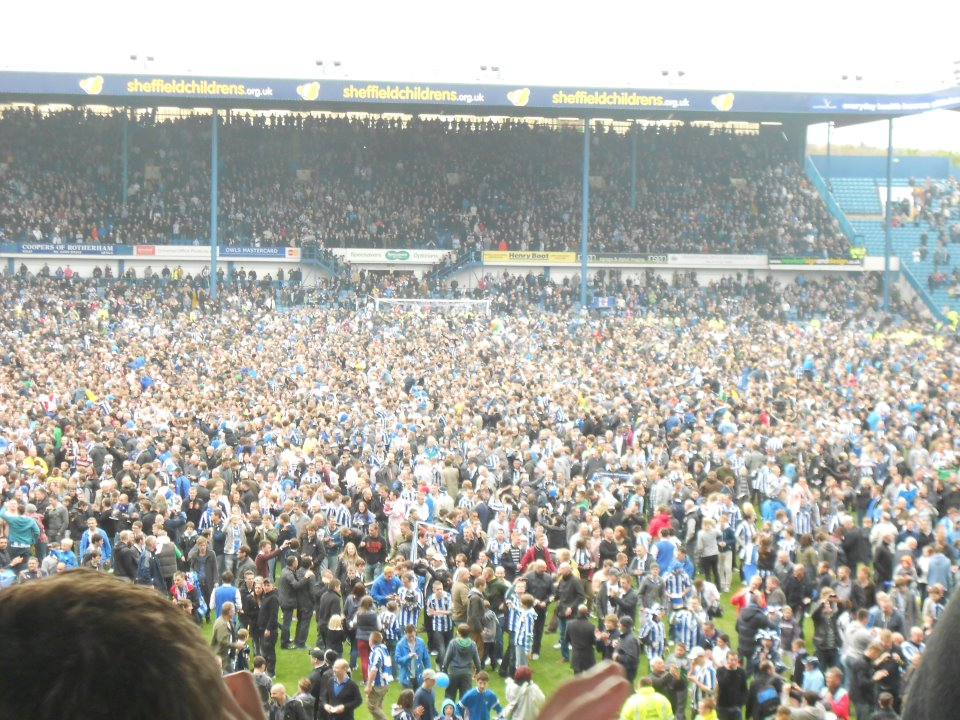
- Sheffield Wednesday fans invade the pitch and celebrate at Hillsborough after being promoted to the Championship at the expense of their rivals Sheffield United.
- Chairman: Milan Mandarić
- Manager: Gary Megson (until 29 February 2012); Dave Jones (from 2 March 2012)
- Stadium: Hillsborough Stadium
- League One: 2nd (promoted)
- FA Cup: Round 4 Replay (eliminated by Blackpool)
- League Cup: Round 2 (eliminated by Blackburn Rovers)
- Football League Trophy: Round 1 (eliminated by Bradford City)
- Top goalscorer: League: Gary Madine (18); All: Gary Madine (18)
- Highest home attendance: 38,082 vs. Wycombe Wanderers, 5 May 2012
- Lowest home attendance: 5,240 vs. Blackpool, 11 August 2011
- Average home league attendance: 19,804 (in all competitions); 21,336 (League One)
Home colours	Away colours

During the 2011–12 season, Sheffield Wednesday F.C. competed in League One, the FA Cup, the League Cup, and the Football League Trophy. It was their second consecutive season in the third tier of English football, and their 110th season in the Football League. At the end of the season they completed their aim of automatic promotion to the Football League Championship, after a remarkable season with many twists and turns.

== League table ==
Pos	Team	Pld	W	D	L	GF	GA	GD	Pts	Promotion, qualification or relegation
1	Charlton Athletic (C, P)	46	30	11	5	82	36	+46	101	Promotion to Football League Championship
2	Sheffield Wednesday (P)	46	28	9	9	81	48	+33	93	Promotion to Football League Championship
3	Sheffield United	46	27	9	10	92	51	+41	90	Qualification for League One play-offs (Note: Four teams play for one spot and promotion to Football League Championship.)
4	Huddersfield Town (O, P)	46	21	18	7	79	47	+32	81	Qualification for League One play-offs
5	Milton Keynes Dons	46	22	14	10	84	47	+37	80	Qualification for League One play-offs

Updated to match(es) played on 5 May 2012. Source: BBC Sport
Rules for classification: 1) Points; 2) Goal difference; 3) Number of goals scored
(C) Champions; (O) Play-off winners; (P) Promoted

== Review ==
=== Pre-season ===
Pre-season for Sheffield Wednesday saw the introduction of many new players, as well as many leaving the club. With this being the first opportunity for manager Gary Megson to change the squad, having only joined Wednesday at the beginning of February and the club in the bottom half of the table, he felt that it was time to vastly change the squad, into a promotion contending team. His intentions were clear even before the pre-season started as the Owls confirmed new signings of David Prutton from recently relegated Swindon Town, and Rob Jones, who had played on loan at the later stages of the previous season. As well as arrivals, there were also many departures, including Richard Hinds whom had been released, striker Paul Heffernan on a free transfer to Kilmarnock, academy product Tommy Spurr on an undisclosed fee to Doncaster Rovers, and midfielder Darren Potter to Milton Keynes Dons. The first day of the new pre-season saw another departure with midfielder Gary Teale leaving on 1 July by mutual consent. Three days later the club signed defender Julian Bennett from Football League Championship side Nottingham Forest on a two-year deal. Sheffield Wednesday's pre-season matches kicked off with a tour in Austria. Before their first match, the club featured more introductions and departures of players. Firstly, Jose Semedo joined the club on a free transfer from Charlton Athletic, in which he had won Charlton Athletic's player of the year the previous season. Defender Michael Morrison then departed the club for Charlton Athletic having only joined the Owls six months previously, this was for an undisclosed fee, rumoured to be for around £1.5million. Also, midfielder Tommy Miller moved across to the West of Yorkshire to Huddersfield Town on a free transfer. The first game the Owls played in their pre-season was against recently promoted Russian Premier League side FC Volga Nizhny Novgorod, the game ended in a goalless draw.

On 14 July 2011, Sheffield Wednesday confirmed 'a groundbreaking sponsorship deal', where both Sheffield clubs (Sheffield Wednesday and rivals Sheffield United) announced at a joint press conference that they would share the same club sponsors, in a collaborative 'twin sponsorship'. This deal was the first of its kinds in the history of British football, whereby two rival clubs shared the same sponsor. The sponsorship deal was with Westfield Health and Volkswagen, with Sheffield Wednesday wearing the Volkswagen logo on their home shirts, and Sheffield United on their away, and Westfield Health on the away shirts of the Owls, and the home of the Blades.

Having arrived back home from the tour in Austria, Sheffield Wednesday faced their first opponents back in England on 16 July, a day before this game, manager Gary Megson announced the club's new captain Rob Jones, who had only joined permanently weeks earlier. The Owls then played Worksop Town away in the first set of pre-season games back in England, in which they won 0–3, thanks to goals from Lewis Buxton on the eleventh minute, Gary Madine ten minutes later and defender Mark Beevers on the sixty-seventh minute. Wednesday's next friendly took place across Sheffield at Don Valley Stadium, where they won Rotherham United 1–2. The Owls took a two-goal lead after goals from Lewis Buxton and Gary Madine, before Adam Le Fondre pulled one back for Rotherham United, which was one of his last goals for Rotherham United as he later went on to sign for Reading. As well as the Wednesday first team taking part in friendlies, a Sheffield Wednesday XI – mainly made up of the Sheffield Wednesday Academy – also took part in several friendlies. The first of these games took place against Stocksbridge Park Steels, in which the result was a 2–0 loss, after an own goal from Ayo Obileye and a goal from Mark Ward. Sheffield Wednesday then went on to play their first home game of the pre-season. The game against Leeds United and finished in a 1–1 draw, with goals from ex-Leeds United player David Prutton finishing after a dribble into the box on the eighth minute, and an eighty-fourth-minute goal from the penalty spot by Max Gradel. Max Gradel's goal was also the last he scored for his club, as he then went on to move to France by joining Marseille. One day later Sheffield Wednesday's XI were in action again, they played the oldest club in the world – local side Sheffield FC. The game ended in a 3–0 loss for the Owls XI, after goals from James Gregory, Danny Kirkland and Connor Higginson. On 26 July the Owls signed central defender Danny Batth on loan for six months from Wolverhampton Wanderers, with the deal due to end in January. Later that same evening, the Owls were in action away to Barnsley. With goals from David Perkins on the seventh minute, and James O'Brien on the eightieth, it ended in a 2–0 loss. Again, a day later on 27 July, the Owls XI played a match, this against local side Hallam FC, whom are six leagues below the first team of Sheffield Wednesday. At half time the game was level at 1–1, with the Wednesday XI scoring their first goal of the pre-season campaign, after they conceded in the third minute from a goal by Matthew Thompson, then Brad Tomlinson equalising in the thirty-second. Thompson scored his second goal of the game to put Hallam FC back in front, and then thirteen minutes later Hallam FC finished off the game with a goal from David Heaver. Although the Owls XI did score a second with six minutes to go thanks to a goal from Mitcham Husbands, the game did finish in a 3–2 loss. The final friendly for the Sheffield Wednesday first team was at home to Premier League side Stoke City on 30 July. Playing their toughest opposition of the pre-season, The Owls managed to end the game in a goalless draw. The final game for the Sheffield Wednesday XI was against Alfreton Town. With Alfreton Town only two leagues below the first team, it was by far their toughest opponents of the pre-season. However, although the game was going to be tough, the outcome turned out to be an embarrassing loss for the Wednesday youngsters – losing by an abysmal 14–0. The game started with an own goal by goalkeeper Sean Cuff, and then thirteen more goals followed, including hat-tricks from Nathan Arnold, Nathan Jarman, and Paul Clayton.

=== August ===
August kicked off with the start of the new season, with Sheffield Wednesday playing in their second consecutive season in the Football League One. Being second favourites for the title, Wednesday were expected to come out with a comfortable win in their first game against Rochdale. In front of the home crowd at Hillsborough Stadium the game finished in a 2–0 win, after goals from captain Rob Jones from a corner-kick, and then a superb volley from outside the area by David Prutton, after the ball was cleared away from a corner. The goal is now up for contention for Sheffield Wednesday's goal of the season. Three days later, The Owls confirmed the signing of striker Chris O'Grady from Rochdale. It was rumoured before the previous game that O'Grady was soon to sign for Wednesday, and actually played his last game for Rochdale against Sheffield Wednesday when he came off the bench in the later stages of that game. Chris O'Grady signed on a three-year contract for an undisclosed fee. With Wednesday only having two first team forward's for their first game of the season, they desperately needed some attacking players. O'Grady made it three strikers at the club, and still needing more depth in that department, The Owls confirmed that Nigerian Danny Uchechi had signed on a six-month loan deal from fellow country team FC Dender. 21-year-old Uchechi had never made a first team professional appearance throughout his career, although having experience at several other English clubs, including Charlton Athletic, West Ham United and Leicester City. However, the next day Uchechi did make his first career appearance when The Owls were hosts to Blackpool in the Football League Cup. The game, which was live on ESPN, was made clear by manager Gary Megson of its unimportance to the club and its seasons expectations, with it possibly being a distraction in gaining promotion in the league. Megson therefore made several changes to the team's starting line-up including giving debuts to youngsters Cecil Nyoni, and Matthew Tumilty – who came off the bench. Blackpool being a league above The Owls were inevitably favourites, even though making several changes themselves. The match went without any goals throughout the full 90 minutes and extra time, even though Blackpool were reduced to ten men after Ashley Eastham was sent-off in the seventy-eighth minute. Wednesday went on to win 4–2 on penalties, after Blackpool missed their first two. Another signing for The Owls was made the same evening of the Blackpool game, this time in midfield with Chris Lines from Bristol Rovers on an undisclosed fee, and a contract lasting three-years. The end of a busy week for Wednesday was ended with their first away trip of the campaign, against AFC Bournemouth. Sheffield Wednesday continued their same away form as the end of the previous season – losing 2–0. Goals in each half from Adam Barrett and Harry Arter finished off The Owls. Wednesday were away again three days later in their first mid-week game of the season. An early goal from Ryan Lowe and a goal five minutes before half-time by Damien Mozika meant Bury led 2–0 at half-time. Although, Chris Sedgwick pulled a goal back for The Owls at the beginning of the second half, Wednesday could not grab another for a draw, the game ended 2–1 and meant a second consecutive loss for Sheffield Wednesday. Before the weekends game back at Hillsborough Stadium against Notts County, Wednesday confirmed the loan signing of winger Ben Marshall from Premier League club Stoke City. Marshall made his debut for Sheffield Wednesday in the 2–1 win against Notts County on the following Saturday. Jeff Hughes gave Notts County an early lead from the penalty spot on the tenth minute. It was not until the second half when Wednesday equalised through Julian Bennett, scoring his first goal for the club having joined in mid-July. Then Gary Madine got the winner fourteen-minutes later, giving The Owls two wins on the bounce at home. A second consecutive mid-week game saw Wednesday visit Premier League club Blackburn Rovers in the Football League Cup. Megson made several changes for the Football League Cup tie once again, and within the first seven-minutes The Owls were already 3–0 down. Although, Clinton Morrison did pull a goal back in the second half, the game finished 3–1, sending Wednesday out of the competition in the second round. The last league game in August saw Wednesday visit captain Rob Jones's former club, Scunthorpe United. With Scunthorpe United recently being relegated from the above division, it was expected to be the toughest opposition in the league yet. The game showed to be a close encounter, in front of a crowd of 16,862 at Hillsborough Stadium, the game finished 3–2 to The Owls. A double-brace from Gary Madine and a first goal in two appearances for Ben Marshall were the goal scorers for Wednesday, and Robert Grant and Mark Duffy both scoring for Scunthorpe United. On 30 August The Owls confirmed another loan signing, this time with defender David Kasnik being brought into the team from Slovenian side Olimpija Ljubljana for six months. The same day Sheffield Wednesday were to play live on Sky Sports in the Football League Trophy against Bradford City. Gary Megson's intentions for this competition were clear again, as just another unimportant fixture, of which was a distraction to the club. He gave a debut to youngster Ayo Obileye who became one of the youngest ever players to play for the club, at the age of 16 years and 363 days. The competition however states that a club has to start at least 'six first team players', so The Owls were unable to make as many changes as they would have liked, but instead three of their 'first team players' were subbed within the first seventeen minutes of the game. One player who did come on was Cecil Nyoni, who was given is second ever career appearance. The game finished goalless and went to penalties, with Bradford City going through 3–1 on penalties. Throughout that game there were many reports that Bury striker Ryan Lowe was in the later stages of signing for the club. It was confirmed after the game that he indeed had signed on a two-year contract for an undisclosed fee, rumoured to be around £1million. The next day saw the last day of the transfer window, The Owls let go Giles Coke on loan to Bury for six months, and Mark Beevers on loan to Milton Keynes Dons.

=== September ===
The beginning of September saw Sheffield Wednesday face promotion rivals Charlton Athletic away at The Valley. With Wednesday yet to gain any points away from home this season, The Owls were happy with the eventual outcome of a 1–1 draw. Bradley Wright-Phillips scored from outside the box into the low corner in just the third minute, but Clinton Morrison earned the point when he equalised in the second half, three-minutes after coming on in the fifty-third minute. In the course of this game, Ryan Lowe made his debut for the club when coming off the bench, but then had to be replaced after an injury. Ryan Lowe did however win the League One Player of the Month award four days later, after scoring seven goals in the opening month of the season for his previous side Bury. The first home game of the month saw another tough opponent of Milton Keynes Dons who held first place in the league. After a poor performance in the first half, the game was goalless and Jermaine Johnson was replaced, as he had only been back in training after injury days earlier. Things changed in the second half with Gary Madine scoring twice in ten minutes, before Angelo Balanta pulled one back for Milton Keynes Dons. With Milton Keynes Dons pushing forward in the later stages of the game, Wednesday hit them on the counter-attack with 19-year-old Scotland U-21 international Liam Palmer scoring his first goal for the club. On 12 September The Owls were sad to hear that Wednesday-supporter and goalkeeper Nicky Weaver was to be 'sidelined for three months', due to an ongoing problem with the cartilage in his knee. This meant second-choice goalkeeper was expected to have an opportunity to impress in several matches on the bounce for Wednesday. His first appearance with the absence of Nicky Weaver however was one to forget. In the mid-week match away to Stevenage The Owls lost 5–1, after four goals in the first half from Craig Reid, John Mousinho, Michael Bostwick, and Lawrie Wilson. Then another to make it five in the second-half by Darius Charles, before Gary Madine scored nothing but a consolation goal in the seventy-fourth minute. Wednesday included their first sending-off of the campaign to make matters worse in the later stages of the game when Jermaine Johnson was sent-off for an off-the-ball incident. After this terrible defeat, Gary Megson felt the squad still needed some improvement, especially with the club having several injuries, including striker Ryan Lowe. Midway through the month David McGoldrick was brought in on a one-month loan, as the emergency-loan window was still open for football league clubs below the Barclays Premier League. David McGoldrick made his debut for Sheffield Wednesday that weekend, in which he started the game away to Yeovil Town. Ten-minutes into the game David McGoldrick scored on his debut to give Wednesday the lead. However, Yeovil Town striker Kieran Agard hit two goals before half-time and The Owls found themselves behind. Having been humiliated the previous away game, Wednesday went out in the second-half hoping to finish the game with a win. Wednesday did exactly that with goals from defender Julian Bennett on the fifty-first minute and twenty-minutes later top scorer Gary Madine scored the winning goal with the game finishing 2–3. Although manager Gary Megson felt goalkeeper Richard O'Donnell was up to the job at first, due to first-choice keeper Nicky Weaver out for three-months, Megson did bring in Stephen Bywater on loan from Derby County for three-months, as The Owls had let in seven goals in two games. With new signing Chris O'Grady coming back from injury that week, and Ryan Lowe soon to be back, striker Clinton Morrison was sent out on loan to Milton Keynes Dons for one-month on an emergency loan deal. The Owls back at home on 24 September they played Exeter City, James O'Connor scored the opener, and a double-brace from Gary Madine, including one from the penalty-spot, made the game finish 3–0.

=== October ===
The beginning of October saw Wednesday travel to Hartlepool United. With an impressive record over Hartlepool United in previous encounters, The Owls built on this fact and scored on the thirty-third minute through Reda Johnson, whose goal turned out to be the winning goal with the game finishing 0–1. The next two games were the biggest of the season so far, with Wednesday facing rivals Chesterfield at home, and then there was the Steel City derby against Sheffield United at Bramall Lane. Going into the Chesterfield game Wednesday were without Liam Palmer who had been called up to the Scotland U-21 side, and defender Reda Johnson being called up to the Benin national football team. With Johnson scoring the winning goal in the previous game and being named in the team of the week, Wednesday would have to deal without him. Wednesday did go onto win the game comfortably in a 3–1 win, with goals from Lewis Buxton, Gary Madine, and loanee Ben Marshall, with former Sheffield Wednesday player Leon Clarke getting a consolation goal just before Wednesday's third. The win took The Owls into the automatic-promotion position of second. In the build-up to the biggest game of the season so far, the Steel City derby against Sheffield United, Wednesday had some good news with top scorer Gary Madine winning The Football League Young Player of the Month award for September. The highly anticipated first Steel City derby of the season was at Bramall Lane in front of over 28,000 fans, and an over a further 11,000 watched the game at Hillsborough Stadium on three large television screens. Wednesday started the game well, and was neutrally supported to have been unlucky to find themselves behind, but at half-time The Owls had not taken their chances and The Blades had taken their two, with Stephen Quinn and Ched Evans finding the net to make it 2–0. The second half was more of an even contest, but The Owls still seemed to be making more chances. Finally, their well and truly deserved goals came twice in four minutes with ten minutes of the game left to play, Chris O'Grady and Gary Madine both scored with headers. Captain Rob Jones nearly grabbed an amazing win in the final minutes but his header was straight at goalkeeper Steve Simonsen. The game finished 2–2, and although Megson felt 'over the course of the game' Wednesday deserved to win, although it was the Wednesday fans who went home the happier. The week after Wednesday's amazing comeback saw David McGoldrick go back to Nottingham Forest after spending one-month on loan, scoring one goal and making four appearances. Also, youngster Nathan Modest left the club by mutual consent on 18 October, after making four appearances in 2008 for the club, and unable to break into the side since, he later signed for local club Sheffield F.C. The Owls built on the Steel City derby result as they won Colchester United 2–0 the next weekend. Goals from captain Rob Jones and Reda Johnson in the second half won the game at Hillsborough. Tuesday 25 October saw Wednesday travel to Carlisle United. Unfortunately for The Owls they ended up dropping points and went two points behind second-place Huddersfield Town after losing 3–2. Impressive loanee Ben Marshall scored against his former club to open the game, before Carlisle United scored three in the second-half, with goals from Lee Miller, Rory Loy, and Liam Noble. To make matters worse, top scorer Gary Madine gained his second bookable offence and got sent-off, but still pushing to somehow get back in the game Rob Jones scored his second in two games, but it was not enough for Sheffield Wednesday. Wednesday were away again in the league at the weekend, this time against Wycombe Wanderers. Vice-captain Jose Semedo scored his first goal for the club to put The Owls in the lead. However, the lead just lasted six-minutes when a wonderful solo dribble and shot saw Jordon Ibe score. Jordon Ibe became the youngest ever player to score for Wycombe Wanderers at just an amazing 15 years and 244 days old on his first-start for the club. Another, first goal for a club came when Ryan Lowe scored to put Wednesday back in the lead, after recently coming back from injury. The goal was enough to seal a 2–1 victory for The Owls. The last piece of news in October was that Wednesday were drawn away in Round 1 to Morecambe in the 2011-12 FA Cup, with the game due to be played on the weekend of 12 November.

=== November ===
The FA Cup clash with Morecambe was announced to be live on ESPN on the first day of the month. Four days later, Sheffield Wednesday faced Brentford who ended The Owls' continuous run of winning games at home since the season started in a 0–0 draw. Morecambe was the next game for Wednesday which was a late kick-off on the Sunday. Former-Bristol Rovers midfielder Chris Lines got the opening with a low shot from outside the area, and in the second-half Chris O'Grady scored his first goal for the club to double the advantage. Laurence Wilson did scored for Morecambe from the penalty-spot on the sixty-second minute, but the home side could not take the game to a reply, finishing 1–2. In Round 2, The Owls were drawn at home to another Football League Two side, this time Aldershot Town. Back to the league and Wednesday were away to Tranmere Rovers. Everton loanee Jose Baxter gave Tranmere Rovers the lead before Chris Lines scored his second goal for Wednesday in two consecutive weeks on the brink of half-time. The Owls did manage to come out with a win though, as Ryan Lowe struck with ten-minutes to go. With the emergency-loan market to end soon, Megson brought in three new players in the last week of November. Firstly, right back James Tavernier was brought in for just over a month from Newcastle United as regular Lewis Buxton had picked up a hamstring injury. Also, with central defensive problems and injuries, Miguel Llera was brought in on loan from Football League Championship club Blackpool. The final addition to the squad came from Premier League club Arsenal as the highly anticipated youngster Sanchez Watt came in for a one-month loan, after top scorer Gary Madine was ruled out for three weeks with an injury. At Hillsborough Stadium on 26 November Sheffield Wednesday edged out a close encounter with Leyton Orient, but thanks to another goal from Benin international Reda Johnson on the nineteenth minute, The Owls won 1–0.

=== December ===
The first of many league games in December came at Hillsborough Stadium in the FA Cup against Aldershot Town. The Owls obviously went into the game favourites, due to Aldershot Town being a league below them. The game was a close encounter though and it was Ryan Lowe's goal that separated the sides meaning The Owls went through to the next round 1–0. Round 3 saw Sheffield Wednesday drawn against top Football League Championship side West Ham United at home. Sheffield Wednesday played Oldham Athletic away on 10 December. After, a very tense and tough first hour, Wednesday continued to battle away and got their award as David Prutton scored one of the club's goals of the season, then a penalty from Ryan Lowe put the game to bed with six-minutes to go, adding another win for The Owls. During the game, the Sheffield Wednesday supporters showed their appreciation to chairman Milan Mandaric, who took over the club one year previously. Mandaric had taken Wednesday out of much debt and chances of administration and up towards the top of the league by making managerial changes. Their fans showed their appreciation at the Oldham Athletic game through a large banner/sign across the away stand which said 'THIS CITY IS OURS – XBAЛA MILAN', with the end words translating to 'thank you Milan'. Mandaric's reacted 'emotionally' to this in which he explained in a statement towards his appreciation of the fans. The banner was put up at the next home game, which was the biggest home game of the season against West Yorkshire rivals Huddersfield Town. The games importance was not only the rivalry, but mainly due to league positions, and could prove to be an important factor in the outcome in the race to automatic promotion. Wednesday were one point ahead of Huddersfield Town in second, however Huddersfield Town had one game in hand, so the three points for either team was of much importance and could be pivotal at the end of the season. The game turned out to be one of the most, if not the most, dramatic and exciting games of the season. In front of the highest attendance of the season so far, and an away crowd filling the away stand The Owls started poorly and Scotland international Jordan Rhodes, the league's top scorer, opened the game to put Huddersfield Town 0–1 up. Just three minutes later and Huddersfield Town's second attack of the game saw Jordan Rhodes score his second of the afternoon and Wednesday were already feeling beaten. On the twenty-seventh minute however Rob Jones pulled one back for The Owls and then another three minutes later Reda Johnson astonishingly put Sheffield Wednesday back on level terms for half-time. Sheffield Wednesday came out into the second-half much like the end of the first-half – the better team. Finally, their award came and Wednesday had managed to come back from two goals behind and turn it into a 3–2 lead, when Ben Marshall took on two players and finished coolly into the bottom corner. So far quite an unbelievable game and to add to the games excitement so far Chris O'Grady scored his second goal for the club to put Wednesday into what was surely a comfortable 4–2 lead. With twelve minutes of the game to go however Wednesday Jordan Rhodes, son of Sheffield Wednesday's goalkeeping coach Andy Rhodes, scored his hat-trick to set up a very nervy last moments of the game. The Owls began to sit-back in order to defend their lead in such an important game and was shocked to hear seven minutes added time had been awarded at the end of the game, due to many yellow cards. Huddersfield Town were pushing closer and closer, and every time goalkeeper Stephen Bywater cleared the ball it went back into the possession of Huddersfield Town. And then in the dying moments a long-ball upfield by the opposition keeper and a flick on found Jordan Rhodes threw on goal, with Reda Johnson, Lewis Buxton, and Jose Semedo all unable to catch him or make a tackle, Jordan Rhodes showed his complacency and scored in the ninety-seventh minute of the game. All Huddersfield Town's players went over to celebrate, while Wednesday were left devastated, even though it ended in a 4–4 draw. A total of nine yellow cards were handed out in the game with Wednesday getting five of them. After such an unbelievable game The Owls travelled to Walsall for their Boxing Day match. During the week between the games Wednesday were given a Christmas treat when they heard consistent centre back Danny Batth had extended his loan deal from Wolverhampton Wanderers until the end of the season. Wednesday took the lead at Bescot Stadium at the weekend on the hour mark thanks to Ryan Lowe. With nerves and thoughts being remembered by the club of the previous weeks last-minute goal, the defence looked 'shaky' and quite astonishingly conceded another goal in stoppage time for the second consecutive week when Claude Gnakpa scored in the ninety-first minute. After that blow Wednesday fell asleep and gave a free-kick away and the ball was floated into the box when Reda Johnson missed timed his jump for the ball by a long way and Emmanuele Smith scored at the far post in the ninety-third minute. Sheffield Wednesday had given away three vital points in the matter of minutes, at the dying moments of the game. After throwing away five points in stoppage time over the last two weeks, Wednesday somehow had still managed to hold onto that second spot. However, this can be seen as even more frustrating as The Owls could have been six points clear in the automatic promotion spot. The team's character and strength was shown though in the next game, when they were away at Preston North End and won 0–2. Goals from loanees Danny Batth and Ben Marshall in the first-half secured the points for The Owls on New Year's Eve. That same day the last piece of news about Sheffield Wednesday in 2011 was that Stephen Bywater had signed on a permanent deal from Derby County on a free transfer. Bywater had impressed manager Gary Megson, after spending the previous three months at the club due to usual first choice goalkeeper Nicky Weaver had been out with an injury.

=== January ===
Wednesday's first game of 2012 came at home to Tranmere Rovers. Sheffield Wednesday got off to a great start when Reda Johnson scored on just the second minute, then five minutes later Chris Lines scored his first home goal of the club to put The Owls 2–0 up. The game relaxed after this until the eighty-second minute when Ian Goodison scored from a corner to put a nervous last ten minutes of the game, with Sheffield Wednesday losing points in the final minutes of games just weeks earlier. However, Sheffield Wednesday managed to hold on and the game finished 2–1. On the Thursday after this game left back Mark Reynolds who had played only a few games since he joined the club at the beginning of the season was sent out on loan till the end of the season to Aberdeen. Sheffield Wednesday faced top of the Football League Championship West Ham United in the FA Cup the following weekend. Both teams made changes and was a very tight encounter even though the odds were stacked up on West Ham United to go through to the next round. It took a late goal to separate the sides when Chris O'Grady scored with two minutes to go of the ninety and sent Sheffield Wednesday through to the next round of the competition. The next day Sheffield Wednesday found they would be playing Blackpool away in Round 4 of the competition. With the transfer market open for the January month The Owls made their first signing when Miguel Llera, who had signed on loan for the month previously, signed on a two-year contract on a free transfer from Blackpool. Also, the club saw the introduction of Mike Jones a winger signed on an undisclosed fee for two-and-a-half years from fellow League One club Bury. In terms of departures, the club saw three when young goalkeeper Sean Cuff was sent out on loan to Cambridge United for a month, out-of-contract James O'Connor left for American club Orlando City, and Giles Coke went back on loan to Bury for the rest of the season. Back to matches and Sheffield Wednesday faced their toughest opponent of the season so far when the played top of the league Charlton Athletic at home, Charlton Athletic were five points clear of second place Sheffield Wednesday and had not dropped from the top of the league since October. The first goal was largely expected to be the key goal and the team who would go on to win the game. Sheffield Wednesday, unbeaten at home throughout the season and only having two draws at Hillsborough Stadium, started slightly on the back foot in front of a crowd of over 26,000 and were the first to concede when Charlton Athletic captain Johnnie Jackson curled a free-kick around the wall and into the net. That turned out to be the only goal of the game and Sheffield Wednesday were ended of their unbeaten run since the beginning of the season at home. Although with much of the season to go, the game was likely to end any chances of Sheffield Wednesday winning the league with Charlton Athletic now eight points clear of second place and Wednesday slipping down to fourth place with city rivals Sheffield United taking up second place four points ahead of The Owls, although they had played one extra game. The final of the four straight home games was against Hartlepool United and after a goalless first half it was Peter Hartley's goal that put Hartlepool United ahead two minutes into the second half. It took a goal by Jermaine Johnson when he took on four players on the right flank before finishing into the far, low bottom corner to put Sheffield Wednesday back on level terms. That goal lifted the fans in the stadium and the players reacted and scored a second with fifteen minutes to go with Gary Madine on the score sheet this time. However, again The Owls opted to start to defend their lead and then what seemed to be a goal out of nothing from outside the box and caught the keeper off his line, as Antony Sweeney's eighty-eighth minute effort meant Sheffield Wednesday could only manage a draw. With Wednesday reaching Round 3 of the FA Cup it meant that the game they would have played in the league on that same weekend was rescheduled to mid-week. This game was rescheduled to 24 January and was away to Scunthorpe United. After two disappointing results in a row Sheffield Wednesday were looking to bounce back. Sheffield Wednesday did exactly that when Chris O'Grady scored in under a minute after a long ball from Miguel Llera found the striker. Sheffield Wednesday then doubled their lead seventeen minutes later as Chris O'Grady grabbed his second. In the second half there was another goal from Jermaine Johnson, when he took on three players after running from the half-way line and slotted the ball coolly into the net when he found himself one-on-one. Jordan Robertson did pull one back for Scunthorpe United from a corner, but the game did finish 1–3 to The Owls. Sheffield Wednesday's next trip was in the FA Cup against Blackpool. Gary Megson made many changes to the side as he wanted to rest his key players ready for the tough mid-week tie in the league against fifth place MK Dons. One of those changes was striker Clinton Morrison who put The Owls unexpectedly ahead on the fifty-second minute. However, Sheffield Wednesday conceded yet another late, late goal, this time it was in the last minute of stoppage time again when Sheffield Wednesday conceded a penalty and Kevin Phillips scored from the spot in the ninety-minute, meaning a replay had to be played – something that neither team wanted due to their league focuses. The draw for the FA Cup saw the winner of the replay to play Premier League side Everton in the fifth round of the competition. After this Tottenham Hotspur young midfielder John Bostock join The Owls on loan until the end of the season. Mid-week and the last day of the month saw Sheffield Wednesday away to fifth place Milton Keynes Dons. Sheffield Wednesday were six points ahead of Milton Keynes Dons in fourth place; however they had played one more game than Milton Keynes Dons. An effort from distance saw the ball hit the bar and then hit goalkeeper Stephen Bywater's leg and roll into the net, giving Milton Keynes Dons the lead after seventeen minutes. Ten minutes later however a corner for Sheffield Wednesday saw Gary MacKenzie put the ball into his own net after the ball bounced off his knee, making it two own goals in the game. The game finished 1–1 and as a result Sheffield Wednesday went home happy with. However, the bad news of the month was Sheffield Wednesday were unable to extend key player Ben Marshall's loan until the end of the season - Marshall had made twenty-two appearances for the club, scoring five goals, and was signed by Football League Championship club Leicester City for over a million pounds.

=== February ===
On the first weekend of February Sheffield Wednesday played Yeovil Town at Hillsborough Stadium. The game ended up being one of the toughest wins of the season, with Wednesday winning 2–1 after a first-half goal from almost nothing by Jonathan Obika gave Yeovil Town the lead, but Jermaine Johnson's shot from 25-yards equalised and then the other Johnson, Reda Johnson added another goal to the season with ten-minutes to go to win the game. In such an important part of the season, where points are so vital, there was a mid-week distraction for The Owls in the FA Cup replay against Blackpool, many changes were made and proved costly as The Owls went down 0–3, all goals coming in the first-half. Although Gary Megson did not see this as an unfortunate happening when Sheffield Wednesday were knocked out at the fourth round replay stage. Back to their only competition left, the League One they were away to relegation-threatened Exeter City, and although Wednesday were second in the league they had played two extra games than some of the teams around them, the most threatening of which was Sheffield United. Therefore, it was more important to get maximum points in the games in hope they can get far enough ahead that the games in hand Sheffield United and other teams have would not be enough to catch them. Having struggled the previous game but still came out with a win, Jermaine Johnson scored is fourth goal in as many matches when he struck in the second-half, however two minutes later on the sixty-eighth minute, Billy Jones equalised for Exeter City, before David Noble scored with six minutes to go and ending the game in a 2–1 loss for Wednesday. This gave teams around them a chance to catch up and Sheffield United were now one point behind them and their city rivals had two games in hand, meaning if they won those they would be five points clear in second, and probably ending any hopes Sheffield Wednesday had of automatic promotion. However, their next game was at home in Sheffield Wednesday's first mid-week home fixture of the season, and having only being beaten once at home against top of the table The Owls were hoping to bounce back. With city rivals Sheffield United breathing closely down Wednesday's backs, Sheffield Wednesday were hoping they would slip up on the same night as they played tough opposition against fourth place Huddersfield Town. However, it was a night to forget for Sheffield Wednesday as a goal from Scott Laird on the stroke of half-time saw The Owls lose for the second time at home this season against Stevenage and meanwhile Sheffield United won Huddersfield Town away 0–1. This meant Wednesday's city rivals went two points ahead with two games in hand. After three losses on the bounce in all competitions Sheffield Wednesday came across North Derbyshire rivals Chesterfield away. Chesterfield were second-to-bottom of the league, but in a derby game form usually 'goes out of the window'. Sheffield Wednesday conceded a penalty on the seventy-eighth minute that Dean Morgan finished and ended the game 1–0 to Chesterfield. Sheffield United won again and with it being the later stages of the season Sheffield Wednesday felt their automatic promotion chances were gone and rivals Sheffield United would beat them to it. Sheffield Wednesday in such a poor run of form, their poorest of the season, it could not have come at a worse time for the club as they face Sheffield United in the Steel City derby at the last weekend of February. Meanwhile, Gary Megson had signed Michail Antonio from Reading on loan until the end of the season after other winger Jermaine Johnson had been put aside injured. Rumours in the media had been suggesting that Gary Megson was not going to last much longer as manager of the club, although Wednesday fans dismissed this as the club still had the chance of getting promoted as they were third in the league even though the club had lost their last four matches in all competitions. Sheffield United were clear favourites having won their last three games, but saw themselves all level at 0–0 at half-time. A surprisingly even contest saw Sheffield Wednesday just having the better of the play in the second half in front of the largest crowd of the season of over 36,000. Then quite amazingly a ball down the right-hand side by debutant Michail Antonio saw Lewis Buxton cross the ball into the box first time and Chris O'Grady headed into the back of the net. The Sheffield Wednesday supporters went crazy and all the players went to celebrate with supposedly under-pressure manager Gary Megson. Although having conceded late goals in the past Wednesday went on to win 1–0. However, after that win Sheffield United were two points ahead of Sheffield Wednesday and if they won their games in hand it could potentially be eight points, leaving Sheffield Wednesday still with hardly any hope of reaching the automatic promotion spot. Mid-week saw Sheffield United win one of their games in hand to put them five points clear and on the same night, Sheffield Wednesday manager Gary Megson was sacked.

=== March ===
Megson had been sacked just days after his 'best win of my (Gary Megson) career', leaving the club third in the table with sixty points from thirty-three games. The news was a surprise and Sheffield Wednesday fans were unhappy with the dismissal of manager and Wednesday supporter himself Gary Megson. With Milan Mandaric taking such a big decision, it was in hope of 'still reaching the automatic promotion spot', although still with some games left it would prove to be a very difficult, and looking an almost impossible task for any manager. With rivals Sheffield United second in the league, having the potential to go eight points clear and although losing against Wednesday still seemingly in good form. And a team in such a high position in the league and having a much bigger goal difference the chances of Sheffield Wednesday catching them up and going ahead of them looked very slim. Assistant manager Chris Evans and first-team coach Neil Thompson were confirmed to take control of first-team affairs until a new appointment was made. Milan Mandaric was expected to make a quick appointment as a loss of such large possible consequences, it was sure a particular new manager was in mind. Also as well as the fans' anger, they were worried the effect of the dismissal of Megson would have on the players. After, scoring such a valuable and pride winning goal majority of the players went over to hug Gary Megson, showing a strong player-to-manager relationship. On 2 March, Sheffield Wednesday announced the appointment of new manager Dave Jones on a three-and-a-half year contract. Dave Jones was rumoured to take the job ever since and before Gary Megson's dismissal. The game against Rochdale the next day finished goalless with Dave Jones watching from the sidelines. Meanwhile, at Sheffield an amazing game took place at Bramall Lane, as Sheffield United were leading comfortably by 2–0 at half time before Oldham Athletic scored two in four minutes to equalise, and then The Blades went down to ten men and then nine as they conceded a penalty in the last minute of the game. Former-Sheffield Wednesday striker Shefki Kuqi scored from the spot and Oldham Athletic won 2–3. This meant Sheffield Wednesday caught up by one point. Dave Jones's first game in charge was shortly after his appointment in a mid-week game at Hillsborough Stadium against Bury. The Owls took an early lead on the eleventh minute with Michail Antonio getting his first goal for the club, Antonio went on to score another as Gary Madine and Ryan Lowe scored as Wednesday won 4–1, a great start to Dave Jones's Sheffield Wednesday managerial career. Meanwhile, Walsall won Sheffield United 3–2, The Owls catching-up by a further three points meaning they were one point behind, however Sheffield United still had a game in hand meaning they could potentially be four points ahead. A second consecutive home game saw Sheffield Wednesday face Bournemouth. Fans could not believe their eyes as goals from Danny Batth, Miles Addison (own goal), and Michail Antonio saw Wednesday 3–0 up inside ten minutes, but that is how the game finished. Sheffield Wednesday were disappointed however as Sheffield United managed to get back to winning ways as they won Brentford 0–2, their wonder top-scorer Ched Evans getting both. Mid-week saw The Blades play their game in hand and drew 1–1 with Colchester United and suddenly was only two points ahead after having the potential to be eight just weeks before. Also, young goalkeeper was loaned to Worksop Town for the rest of the season to get some experience around a first-team squad. Sheffield Wednesday however faced Notts County the next weekend away, and they were incredible form, having been 4–0 up on top of the league Charlton Athletic at just half-time. A tough battle as it was expected to be fortunately saw Sheffield Wednesday win 1–2, by far Dave Jones's toughest game yet. Goals from Ryan Lowe and Gary Madine, before Lloyd Sam pulled a late goal back for Notts County. At Bramall Lane Sheffield United only drew with Tranmere Rovers, meaning Sheffield Wednesday were now level on points, however The Blades had a significant better goal difference. Back at Hillsborough Stadium and The Owls faced Walsall, the team that brought back bad memories for Wednesday fans having conceded two goals in stoppage time the last time the teams met. At half-time it was goalless while Sheffield United were comfortably beating Notts County by a surprisingly large amount of 0–4. With The Blades bound to win their game, Sheffield Wednesday had to stay on track with them. However, Sheffield Wednesday found themselves 1–2 down and after pushing late for an equaliser, it was the last kick of the game as Gary Madine scored in the ninety-fifth minute against relegation-threatened Walsall. The fans went home disappointed as they felt it was a game they could have won, however it was seconds away from being a 'catastrophy' as Dave Jones described it. After not impressing in the team, loanee John Bostock was recalled by Tottenham Hotspur after making six appearances for the club, meanwhile as the emergency-loan transfer market came towards a close Dave Jones brought in Keith Treacy on loan from Burnley and Nile Ranger on loan from Newcastle United – both on loan until the end of the season. The next game was against Leyton Orient, Reda Johnson's goal won the game for The Owls, as both Keith Treacy and Nile Ranger made their debuts for the club after coming off the bench. Sheffield United did not play as their opponents Chesterfield played in the Football League Trophy, this meaning that Sheffield Wednesday temporarily went into second as Sheffield United played rivals Chesterfield mid-week and won 4–1. The last game of a quite long, but incredible month, came and Sheffield Wednesday featured in an early kick-off live on Sky Sports. They won 2–0, after a double-brace by Madine, while later Sheffield United also won again 0–1. Both teams in form, it set up a fantastic end of the season as April came closer and could decide the two fierce rivals between automatic promotion and who would have to settle for the play-offs.

=== April ===
On 6 April 2012, it was announced that manager Dave Jones had won the Football League One Manager of the Month award for March, while Michail Antonio just missed out on Player of the Month award. 7 April saw another early kick-off with Sheffield Wednesday playing Yorkshire rivals Huddersfield Town who were in fourth, six points behind Wednesday with a game in hand. After a goalless first half, Spaniard Miguel Llera struck a free-kick round the wall and into the bottom corner in the fifty-fourth minute, scoring his first goal for Wednesday and giving them a well deserved lead. Then Nile Ranger found himself through on goal eighteen minutes later and having missed a 'sitter' and hitting the bar earlier, he showed composure to double The Owls' lead and the game finished 0–2. Sheffield Wednesday went home happy in knowledge of the importance of the game and the fact that they won comfortably compared to what was expected to be a very tough game. Sheffield United played later on in the day and again won as they edged out a 2–1 victory over Bournemouth. Two days later on the Bank Holiday Monday The Owls played their third consecutive early kick-off in a row as they played back at home and were live on Sky Sports against Oldham Athletic. Sheffield Wednesday had so far had similar results against the same clubs as their rivals Sheffield United, such as both losing at the likes of Carlisle United, Charlton Athletic, and Walsall, and both winning against teams such as Bournemouth, Bury etc. And with the knowledge of Sheffield United losing to Oldham Athletic earlier on in the season at home, Wednesday needed to ensure that this did not happen here. Gary Madine scored just before half-time and then Keith Treacy's two crosses with each foot secured victory for The Owls as Miguel Llera and Ryan Lowe headed home from them. Sheffield United again played later, this time a day after Sheffield Wednesday and they won bottom of the league Rochdale. With both rivals in such good form as they aim for automatic promotion it was likely to be who 'slipped' up first. And unfortunately for Sheffield Wednesday it was them as they drew with Colchester United, who had drawn their last four games at home. This game finished 1–1 after an early goal from Ian Henderson from a poor mistake by Michail Antonio and Miguel Llera equalised in the second half but The Owls were unable to pull off those three vital points and drew meaning with Sheffield United winning they were four points behind their rivals with three games to go – so although it had once before in the season looked like Sheffield United had secured the automatic promotion spot, it looked near enough confirmed this time as they had such a large goal difference as well. During the week though Sheffield United star striker and player Ched Evans was in court for the R v Evans and McDonald criminal prosecution case. Ched Evans on the Friday was found guilty of rape and was sentenced to five years in jail, meaning Sheffield United were without their best player of the season, who had led them to victory in so many games and scored over thirty goals throughout the season. However, with Sheffield United in such good form, there was still little doubts about the outcome of the season. The next day Sheffield Wednesday faced Carlisle United who were fighting for a play-off spot and was a must win game for them as well. While Sheffield United were away to in-form Milton Keynes Dons who lay in fifth place. Chris Lines's right-footed shot rolled into the bottom corner in the twenty-sixth minute of the match to put Sheffield Wednesday 1 goal up. Sheffield United however had conceded in their game to make things as they stood Wednesday one point behind their city rivals with two games to go. As Sheffield United were still trailing, Wednesday were cruelly punished for not finishing their chances within the game as James Berrett equalised to send Carlisle United into jubilation. As the Sheffield United game had finished Wednesday still had several minutes of stoppage time to play. And their deserved goal came as Michail Antonio who had injured his right foot and right shoulder during the game, continued to play and dribbled round one player and finished in a tight corner to send the Sheffield Wednesday fans absolutely crazy as Antonio's winning goal came in the ninety-fifth minute of the game. This goal still gave Wednesday a chance as they were now one point behind Sheffield United thanks to that late, late goal. With both Sheffield clubs playing teams who were likely to be relegated by the last game of the season, the second-to-last games of the season were seen to most as the decider in the automatic promotion race. It was Sheffield Wednesday who kicked off first at three o'clock on the Saturday of the last weekend of April. They faced another difficult challenge as Brentford who they were playing away, were desperate for maximum points as they looked to get into the final play-off place. In the first-half it was Brentford who were the better side as they missed one 'sitter' and hit the bar from four-yards out and should have been in front. However, a free-kick saw Keith Treacy pick out the bottom corner as the goalkeeper was not covering his near post and was caught unaware of that possibility. Wednesday went into the break ahead, although they had scored against the run of play. The second half was similar to the first but Wednesday were playing better, but Brentford still had the better of the play. And then in the sixty-second minute Mark Beevers conceded a penalty and was lucky not to be sent off after already having a yellow card. Clayton Donaldson scored and Sheffield Wednesday still being on the back foot, were looking unlikely to win even though they so desperately had to. Then up-jumped Miguel Llera to head the ball up into the net four minutes later to put Wednesday back in front. After several misses from Brentford, a one-on-one and a great save from Stephen Bywater, Sheffield Wednesday went home with a 2–1 win. Sheffield United had a late kick-off and was live on Sky Sports and was being viewed by all supporters of both rival clubs. They played Stevenage who were in an incredible run of form going into the game, as they pushed for the final play-off place themselves. Although, Sheffield United started brightly they were unable to convert any chances and was missing their star player Ched Evans. And then joy for Stevenage and Sheffield Wednesday fans alike as Joel Byrom scored and put Stevenage one nil up at half-time. Two minutes into the second half and Stevenage scored again, sending The Owls and Stevenage wild again. Sheffield United had to win to stay above Sheffield Wednesday and pulled a goal back and then Matthew Lowton equalised to make it 2–2 with five minutes to go plus stoppage time. It was the most tense and heart-racing moments of both Sheffield United and Sheffield Wednesday as they knew one goal for The Blades in those final moments could be the decisive goal in the automatic promotion race. A fabulous save from Chris Day in the final minutes was able to stop Sheffield United and they could only manage to draw. Meaning Sheffield Wednesday after such an amazing season, for fans of both clubs and the neutral, were now second and in the driving seat for automatic promotion.

=== May ===
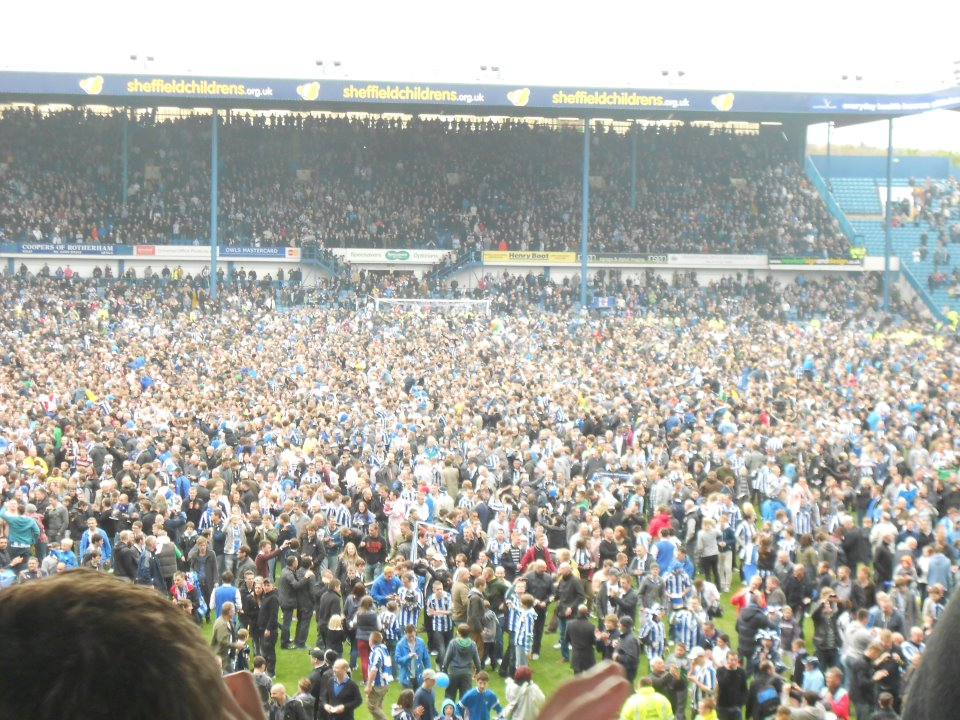
Wednedayites celebrating on the pitch, following promotion to the Championship, on 5 May 2012

Wednesday final game of the season was against fourth-to-bottom placed Wycombe Wanderers, who had already been relegated to the Football League Two the previous week. Wycombe Wanderers had only brought around 200 fans, so Wednesday supporters were given an extra 6,000 seats, giving them a home capacity of over 37,000. Hillsborough Stadium was completely sold-out and was the biggest attendance of the season, at the last game of the season. Sheffield United were to play away to Exeter City who were second-to-bottom in the league and also already relegated. Both teams were expected to win. But with so many twists and turns in the season would there be one more on the final day of the season? Would this twist see Sheffield United promoted and Sheffield Wednesday heading for the play-offs? Or would Sheffield Wednesday stay concentrated on the game ahead and continue their unbeaten run under manager Dave Jones for one last important win? All would be told between ninety minutes of football kicking off at three o'clock on Saturday 5 May 2012. At Hillsborough Stadium within the first twenty-minutes, Jose Semedo blasted the ball over from close range and should have done better, while on the twenty-fourth minute of the Sheffield United game at St James Park striker Alan Gow put Exeter City in front, and a minute later even better news for Sheffield Wednesday as they took the lead as Michail Antonio did well as he finished with the ball bouncing awkwardly. Things were getting better and better for Wednesday on the most crucial game of the season as James Beattie got sent-off for Sheffield United for a professional foul. Hillsborough Stadium saw Lewis Buxton go down either in the penalty box or on the outside, the referee judged that the foul was committed outside the box and then Nile Ranger had a goal disallowed for offside. However, in the other game, even though The Blades were down to ten-men, just before half-time Lee Williamson equalised and put Sheffield United on level terms at the break, while Sheffield Wednesday were on the way to the Football League Championship as they were ahead by a goal to nil. After the break and Sheffield United came back fighting as Kevin McDonald put The Blades ahead and hoping Sheffield Wednesday would conceded. However, five minutes later on the fifty-second minute, Nile Ranger doubled Sheffield Wednesday's lead and put The Owls on course to promotion. Exeter City did equalise late on into added time but it would not even matter as Sheffield Wednesday won anyway and fans ran onto the pitch in celebration while the players did a lap of honour to show their appreciation. After catching Sheffield United the majority of the last half of the season, the table finished with Wednesday three points ahead in second-place and were automatically promoted to the Football League Championship. An end to quite a remarkable season, as Sheffield Wednesday looked upon games such as the 4–4 draw with Huddersfield Town – conceding in the ninety-seventh minute, being eight points behind their rivals, winning Sheffield United at home and so many other twists and turns. It was the perfect ending of the season for Sheffield Wednesday Football Club. A day after this saw the end of the season club awards. It proved to be a successful night for vice-Captain Jose Semedo as he won both the Fans' Player of the Season and the Players' Player of the Season. Semedo said 'This is a tremendous honour and one I will remember forever. I have to say thank you for everyone who voted for me and thank you everyone at the club. This season has been unbelievable for me and the team.'. Other awards saw Chris O'Grady's header at the Sheffield United home game named Goal of the Season. The Outstanding Contribution award was handed to chairman Milan Mandaric after he rescued Wednesday from the brink of administration, stabilised the club on all levels before steering the Owls to automatic promotion the Championship this season. Captain Rob Jones won the Owls' Player in the Community award, while youngster Jarrod Kyle lifted the Academy Player of the Year award. In further celebrations of promotion Wednesday were invited by the Lord Mayor of Sheffield to a Civic Reception in the centre of the city. Fans were packed out on the streets in their thousands to see the players and continue to celebrate the club's season success.

== Players and staff ==
=== Current squad ===
As of 22 April 2012

Note: Flags indicate national team as defined under FIFA eligibility rules; some limited exceptions apply. Players may hold more than one non-FIFA nationality.

No.	Pos.	Nation	Player
1	GK	ENG	Nicky Weaver
2	DF	ENG	Lewis Buxton
3	DF	ENG	Julian Bennett
4	DF	ENG	Danny Batth (on loan from Wolves)
5	DF	ENG	Rob Jones (captain)
6	MF	POR	José Semedo
7	MF	ENG	David Prutton
8	MF	ENG	Chris Lines
9	FW	ENG	Chris O'Grady
10	MF	IRL	Keith Treacy (on loan from Burnley)
11	MF	JAM	Jermaine Johnson
12	MF	SCO	Liam Palmer
13	DF	ENG	Mark Beevers

No.	Pos.	Nation	Player
14	FW	ENG	Gary Madine
15	MF	ENG	Chris Sedgwick
16	MF	ENG	Mike Jones
17	DF	BEN	Reda Johnson
20	DF	ENG	Jon Otsemobor
21	DF	ENG	Daniel Jones
24	GK	ENG	Arron Jameson
27	MF	ENG	Michail Antonio (on loan from Reading)
30	FW	ENG	Ryan Lowe
31	FW	ENG	Nile Ranger (on loan from Newcastle United)
32	DF	ESP	Miguel Llera
43	GK	ENG	Stephen Bywater

=== Players on loan ===
Note: Flags indicate national team as defined under FIFA eligibility rules; some limited exceptions apply. Players may hold more than one non-FIFA nationality.

No.	Pos.	Nation	Player
18	Defender (association football)	SCO	Mark Reynolds (on loan at Aberdeen)
19	Forward (association football)	IRL	Clinton Morrison (on loan at Brentford)

No.	Pos.	Nation	Player
22	Midfielder	ENG	Giles Coke (on loan at Bury)
23	GK	ENG	Richard O'Donnell (on loan at Macclesfield Town)

=== Youth squad ===
As of 25 February 2012.

Note: Flags indicate national team as defined under FIFA eligibility rules; some limited exceptions apply. Players may hold more than one non-FIFA nationality.

No.	Pos.	Nation	Player
–	GK	ENG	Lee Wall
–	GK	ENG	Cameron Dawson
–	DF	ENG	Ayo Obileye
–	DF	ENG	Matthew Tumilty
–	DF	ENG	Johnny Fenwick
–	DF	ENG	Marc Peacock
–	DF	ENG	Niall Smith
–	DF	ENG	Nick Hague
–	DF	ENG	Tom Rowbotham
–	MF	ENG	Emmanuel Dieseruvwe

No.	Pos.	Nation	Player
–	MF	ENG	Hayden White
–	MF	ENG	Elias Moses
–	MF	ENG	Matty Kingston
–	MF	ENG	Scott Canham
–	FW	AUS	Jarrod Kyle
–	FW	ENG	Wale Ayoola
–	FW	ENG	Mitcham Husbands
–	FW	ENG	Brad Tomlinson
–	FW	SLO	Roy Rudonja

=== International Call-Ups ===
No	Pos	Name	Team	Competition	Opposition	Date	Caps	Goals	Ref
12	MF	Liam Palmer	Scotland U-21	2013 UEFA U-21 Euro Qualifier	Bulgaria U-21	5 September 2011	3	0	
12	MF	Liam Palmer	Scotland U-21	2013 UEFA U-21 Qualifier	Luxembourg U-21	6 October 2011	4	0	
17	DF	Réda Johnson	Benin	2012 Africa Cup of Nations Qualifier	Rwanda	9 October 2011	9	0	
12	MF	Liam Palmer	Scotland U-21	2013 UEFA U-21 Qualifier	Austria U-21	10 October 2011	5	0	
12	MF	Liam Palmer	Scotland U-21	2013 UEFA U-21 Qualifier	Netherlands U-21	14 November 2011	6	0	
12	MF	Liam Palmer	Scotland U-21	Friendly	Italy U-21	25 April 2012	7	0	
12	MF	Liam Palmer	Scotland U-21	2013 UEFA U-21 Qualifier	Bulgaria U-21	31 May 2012	8	0	

=== Coaching and Medical Staff ===
- Manager: (England) Dave Jones
- Assistant Manager: (England) Terry Burton
- First Team Coach: (England) Neil Thompson
- Goalkeeping Coach: (England) Andy Rhodes
- Director of Performance: (England) Alex Armstrong
- Head Physiotherapist: (England) Paul Smith
- Assistant Physiotherapist: (England) Dean Taylor

== Squad statistics ==
=== Appearances and goals ===
As of 5 May 2012

No.	Pos	Nat	Player	Total		League One		FA Cup		League Cup		FL Trophy	
No.	Pos	Nat	Player	Apps	Goals	Apps	Goals	Apps	Goals	Apps	Goals	Apps	Goals
1	GK	(England) ENG	Nicky Weaver	10	0	8+0	0	1+0	0	0+0	0	1+0	0
2	DF	(England) ENG	Lewis Buxton	40	1	37+1	1	2+0	0	0+0	0	0+0	0
3	DF	(England) ENG	Julian Bennett	29	2	20+5	2	4+0	0	0+0	0	0+0	0
4	DF	(England) ENG	Danny Batth	49	2	44+0	2	4+0	0	1+0	0	0+0	0
5	DF	(England) ENG	Rob Jones	38	4	33+1	4	4+0	0	0+0	0	0+0	0
6	MF	(Portugal) POR	José Semedo	52	1	46+0	1	4+1	0	0+0	0	1+0	0
7	MF	(England) ENG	David Prutton	32	2	22+6	2	2+1	0	0+0	0	1+0	0
8	MF	(England) ENG	Chris Lines	54	4	42+5	3	5+0	1	1+1	0	0+0	0
9	FW	(England) ENG	Chris O'Grady	39	7	27+7	5	4+1	2	0+0	0	0+0	0
10	MF	(Republic of Ireland) IRL	Keith Treacy	7	1	2+5	1	0+0	0	0+0	0	0+0	0
11	MF	(Jamaica) JAM	Jermaine Johnson	39	4	21+12	4	4+2	0	0+0	0	0+0	0
12	MF	(Scotland) SCO	Liam Palmer	29	1	14+8	1	3+0	0	2+1	0	1+0	0
13	DF	(England) ENG	Mark Beevers	10	0	4+3	0	1+0	0	1+0	0	1+0	0
14	FW	(England) ENG	Gary Madine	43	18	38+2	18	1+0	0	2+0	0	0+0	0
15	MF	(England) ENG	Chris Sedgwick	21	1	9+5	1	4+1	0	1+0	0	1+0	0
16	MF	(England) ENG	Mike Jones	14	0	10+4	0	0+0	0	0+0	0	0+0	0
17	DF	(Benin) BEN	Reda Johnson	32	7	24+2	7	4+0	0	2+0	0	0+0	0
20	DF	(England) ENG	Jon Otsemobor	20	0	11+3	0	3+1	0	2+0	0	0+0	0
21	MF	(England) ENG	Daniel Jones	7	0	2+2	0	1+1	0	1+0	0	0+0	0
24	GK	(England) ENG	Arron Jameson	0	0	0+0	0	0+0	0	0+0	0	0+0	0
25	DF	(England) ENG	Matthew Tumilty	1	0	0+0	0	0+0	0	0+1	0	0+0	0
27	MF	(England) ENG	Michail Antonio	14	5	14+0	5	0+0	0	0+0	0	0+0	0
29	DF	(England) ENG	Ayo Obileye	1	0	0+0	0	0+0	0	0+0	0	1+0	0
30	FW	(England) ENG	Ryan Lowe	41	9	21+15	8	4+1	1	0+0	0	0+0	0
31	FW	(England) ENG	Nile Ranger	8	2	7+1	2	0+0	0	0+0	0	0+0	0
32	DF	(Spain) ESP	Miguel Llera	24	4	19+5	4	0+0	0	0+0	0	0+0	0
43	GK	(England) ENG	Stephen Bywater	34	0	32+0	0	2+0	0	0+0	0	0+0	0
Players that have featured for Sheffield Wednesday in a match day squad this season who are out on loan:
18	DF	(Scotland) SCO	Mark Reynolds	6	0	3+0	0	0+0	0	2+0	0	1+0	0
19	FW	(Republic of Ireland) IRL	Clinton Morrison	41	3	18+12	1	4+2	1	2+2	1	1+0	0
22	MF	(England) ENG	Giles Coke	3	0	0+0	0	0+0	0	2+0	0	0+1	0
23	GK	(England) ENG	Richard O'Donnell	11	0	6+0	0	2+0	0	2+0	0	0+1	0
26	MF	(Zimbabwe) ZIM	Cecil Nyoni	2	0	0+0	0	0+0	0	1+0	0	0+1	0
34	GK	(England) ENG	Sean Cuff	0	0	0+0	0	0+0	0	0+0	0	0+0	0
Players that have featured for Sheffield Wednesday in a match day squad this season who are not now at the club:
10	MF	(England) ENG	John Bostock	6	0	4+2	0	0+0	0	0+0	0	0+0	0
10	MF	(England) ENG	Ben Marshall	22	5	22+0	5	0+0	0	0+0	0	0+0	0
16	MF	(Republic of Ireland) IRL	James O'Connor	22	1	11+7	1	1+0	0	2+0	0	1+0	0
27	FW	(Nigeria) NGR	Danny Uchechi	5	0	1+1	0	0+0	0	2+0	0	1+0	0
27	DF	(England) ENG	James Tavernier	6	0	4+0	0	2+0	0	0+0	0	0+0	0
31	DF	(Slovenia) SLO	David Kašnik	0	0	0+0	0	0+0	0	0+0	0	0+0	0
32	FW	(England) ENG	David McGoldrick	4	1	3+1	1	0+0	0	0+0	0	0+0	0
33	FW	(England) ENG	Sanchez Watt	6	0	4+2	0	0+0	0	0+0	0	0+0	0

=== Top scorers ===
Place	Position	Nation	Number	Name	League One	FA Cup	League Cup	JP Trophy	Total
1	FW	(England)	14	Gary Madine	18	0	0	0	18
=	FW	(England)	30	Ryan Lowe	8	1	0	0	9
3	FW	(England)	9	Chris O'Grady	5	2	0	0	7
=	DF	(Benin)	17	Reda Johnson	7	0	0	0	7
=	MF	(England)	27	Michail Antonio	5	0	0	0	5
=	MF	(England)	10	Ben Marshall	5	0	0	0	5
7	DF	(England)	5	Rob Jones	4	0	0	0	4
=	MF	(Jamaica)	11	Jermaine Johnson	4	0	0	0	4
=	MF	(England)	8	Chris Lines	3	1	0	0	4
10	FW	(Republic of Ireland)	19	Clinton Morrison	1	1	1	0	3
=	DF	(Spain)	32	Miguel Llera	3	0	0	0	3
12	MF	(England)	7	David Prutton	2	0	0	0	2
=	DF	(England)	3	Julian Bennett	2	0	0	0	2
=	DF	(England)	4	Danny Batth	2	0	0	0	2
=	FW	(England)	31	Nile Ranger	2	0	0	0	2
16	MF	(England)	15	Chris Sedgwick	1	0	0	0	1
=	MF	(Scotland)	12	Liam Palmer	1	0	0	0	1
=	MF	(Portugal)	6	Jose Semedo	1	0	0	0	1
=	DF	(England)	2	Lewis Buxton	1	0	0	0	1
=	MF	(Republic of Ireland)	16	James O'Connor	1	0	0	0	1
=	FW	(England)	32	David McGoldrick	1	0	0	0	1
=	MF	(Republic of Ireland)	10	Keith Treacy	1	0	0	0	1
				Totals	69	5	1	0	75

=== Sheffield Wednesday Man of the Match ===
Place	Position	Nation	Number	Name	League One	FA Cup	League Cup	JP Trophy	Total
1	MF	(England)	27	Michail Antonio	6	0	0	0	6
=	DF	(Spain)	32	Miguel Llera	6	0	0	0	6
3	MF	(England)	10	Ben Marshall	5	0	0	0	5
4	DF	(England)	4	Danny Batth	3	1	0	0	4
=	FW	(England)	14	Gary Madine	4	0	0	0	4
=	FW	(England)	9	Chris O'Grady	2	2	0	0	4
=	MF	(Portugal)	6	José Semedo	4	0	0	0	4
8	MF	(Jamaica)	11	Jermaine Johnson	3	0	0	0	3
=	DF	(Benin)	17	Réda Johnson	3	0	0	0	3
10	DF	(England)	5	Rob Jones	2	0	0	0	2
=	MF	(England)	8	Chris Lines	1	1	0	0	2
=	MF	(Scotland)	12	Liam Palmer	1	0	1	0	2
13	DF	(England)	13	Mark Beevers	1	0	0	0	1
=	DF	(England)	2	Lewis Buxton	1	0	0	0	1
=	GK	(England)	43	Stephen Bywater	0	1	0	0	1
=	FW	(Republic of Ireland)	19	Clinton Morrison	1	0	0	0	1
=	MF	(Republic of Ireland)	16	James O'Connor	0	0	1	0	1
=	GK	(England)	23	Richard O'Donnell	0	0	0	1	1
=	MF	(England)	7	David Prutton	1	0	0	0	1
=	MF	(Republic of Ireland)	10	Keith Treacy	1	0	0	0	1
=	GK	(England)	1	Nicky Weaver	1	0	0	0	1
				Totals	46	5	2	1	54

=== Disciplinary record ===
Number	Nation	Position	Name	League One		FA Cup		League Cup		JP Trophy		Total	
Number	Nation	Position	Name	Yellow card	Red card	Yellow card	Red card	Yellow card	Red card	Yellow card	Red card	Yellow card	Red card
14	(England)	FW	Gary Madine	8	1	0	0	1	0	0	0	9	1
11	(Jamaica)	MF	Jermaine Johnson	3	1	0	0	0	0	0	0	3	1
17	(Benin)	DF	Reda Johnson	8	0	1	0	1	0	0	0	10	0
5	(England)	DF	Rob Jones	9	0	0	0	0	0	0	0	9	0
6	(Portugal)	MF	José Semedo	8	0	0	0	0	0	0	0	8	0
4	(England)	DF	Danny Batth	7	0	1	0	0	0	0	0	8	0
8	(England)	MF	Chris Lines	4	0	1	0	1	0	0	0	6	0
19	(Republic of Ireland)	FW	Clinton Morrison	2	0	1	0	0	0	0	0	3	0
30	(England)	FW	Ryan Lowe	3	0	0	0	0	0	0	0	3	0
32	(Spain)	DF	Miguel Llera	3	0	0	0	0	0	0	0	3	0
2	(England)	DF	Lewis Buxton	3	0	0	0	0	0	0	0	3	0
31	(England)	FW	Nile Ranger	3	0	0	0	0	0	0	0	3	0
10	(England)	MF	Ben Marshall	2	0	0	0	0	0	0	0	2	0
7	(England)	MF	David Prutton	2	0	0	0	0	0	0	0	2	0
16	(Republic of Ireland)	MF	James O'Connor	2	0	0	0	0	0	0	0	2	0
15	(England)	MF	Chris Sedgwick	1	0	1	0	0	0	0	0	2	0
3	(England)	DF	Julian Bennett	0	0	1	0	0	0	0	0	1	0
12	(Scotland)	MF	Liam Palmer	1	0	0	0	0	0	0	0	1	0
27	(England)	DF	James Tavernier	1	0	0	0	0	0	0	0	1	0
10	(England)	MF	John Bostock	1	0	0	0	0	0	0	0	1	0
25	(England)	DF	Matthew Tumilty	0	0	0	0	1	0	0	0	1	0
22	(England)	MF	Giles Coke	0	0	0	0	1	0	0	0	1	0
18	(Scotland)	DF	Mark Reynolds	0	0	0	0	1	0	0	0	1	0
9	(England)	FW	Chris O'Grady	1	0	0	0	0	0	0	0	1	0
13	(England)	DF	Mark Beevers	1	0	0	0	0	0	0	0	1	0
			TOTALS	71	2	6	0	6	0	0	0	83	2

== Matches ==
=== Pre-season ===
12 July 2011	FC Volga Novgorod	0–0	Sheffield Wednesday	REMAX Arena, Irdning, Austria
18:00

16 July 2011	Worksop Town	0–3	Sheffield Wednesday	Sandy Lane, Worksop
15:00			Buxton 11'; Madine 21'; Beevers 67'

19 July 2011	Rotherham United	1–2	Sheffield Wednesday	Don Valley Stadium, Sheffield
19:45	Le Fondre 83'		Buxton 50'; Madine 65'	Attendance: 5,589

20 July 2011	Stocksbridge Park Steels	2–0	Sheffield Wednesday XI	Look Local Stadium, Stocksbridge
19:45	Obileye 76' (o.g.); Ward 84'

23 July 2011	Sheffield Wednesday	1–1	Leeds United	Hillsborough Stadium, Sheffield
13:00	Prutton 8'		Gradel 84' (pen.)

24 July 2011	Sheffield FC	3–0	Sheffield Wednesday XI	BT Local Business Stadium, Dronfield
15:00	James Gregory 5'; Danny Kirkland 28'; Connor Higginson (?)

26 July 2011	Barnsley	2–0	Sheffield Wednesday	Oakwell, Barnsley
19:30	Perkins 7'; O'Brien 80'			Attendance: 6,519

27 July 2011	Hallam FC	3–2	Sheffield Wednesday XI	Sandygate Road, Sheffield
19:45	Matthew Thompson 3', 57'; David Heavar 70'		Brad Tomlinson 32'; Mitchell Husband 84'

30 July 2011	Sheffield Wednesday	0–0	Stoke City	Hillsborough Stadium, Sheffield
13:00				Attendance: 3,959

31 July 2011	Alfreton Town	14–0	Sheffield Wednesday XI	North Street, Alfreton
14:00	Cuff 2' (o.g.); Law 6', 85'; Arnold 21', 23', 38'; Senior 32'; Jarman 40', 43', 60'; Clayton 45', 54', 80' (pen.); Hall 63'	Report		Attendance: 538

=== League One ===
6 August 2011 1	Sheffield Wednesday	2–0	Rochdale	Hillsborough Stadium
15:00	R. Jones 17' (yellow card) 69'; Morrison (yellow card) 53'; Prutton 72'		Trotman (yellow card) 69'	Attendance: 21,174

13 August 2011 2	Bournemouth	2–0	Sheffield Wednesday	Dean Court
15:00	Barrett 38'; Molesley (yellow card) 56'; Arter 83'		Madine (yellow card) 50'; Buxton (yellow card) 75'; R. Jones (yellow card) 90+1'	Attendance: 6,901

16 August 2011 3	Bury	2–1	Sheffield Wednesday	Gigg Lane Stadium
19:45	Lowe 7'; Mozika 41'; Hughes (yellow card) 65'		Prutton (yellow card) 6'; R. Johnson (yellow card) 18'; Sedgwick 47'	Attendance: 5,219

20 August 2011 4	Sheffield Wednesday	2–1	Notts County	Hillsborough Stadium
15:00	Bennett 53'; Madine 68'		J. Hughes 10' (pen.); Judge (yellow card) 24'; Sheehan (yellow card) 36'; Bishop (yellow card) 63' (yellow-red card) 78'	Attendance: 16,979

27 August 2011 5	Sheffield Wednesday	3–2	Scunthorpe United	Hillsborough Stadium
15:00	Madine 5', 70'; Marshall 17'		Lillis (yellow card) 12'; Grant 67'; Duffy 85'	Attendance: 16,862

5 September 2011 6	Charlton Athletic	1–1	Sheffield Wednesday	The Valley
19:45	Wright-Phillips 3'; Morrison (yellow card) 35'		R. Jones (yellow card) 35'; Semedo (yellow card) 42'; Morrison 56' (yellow card) 62'; Prutton (yellow card) 72'	Attendance: 14,014

10 September 2011 7	Sheffield Wednesday	3–1	Milton Keynes Dons	Hillsborough Stadium
15:00	Batth (yellow card) 34'; Madine 54', 63'; Palmer 89'		Ibehre (yellow card) 41' (yellow-red card) 90+5'; Balanta 77'	Attendance: 16,982

13 September 2011 8	Stevenage	5–1	Sheffield Wednesday	Broadhall Way
19:45	Reid 6'; Mousinho 10'; Bostwick 17'; Wilson 38'; Charles 67'		Madine 74'; J. Johnson (red card) 87'	Attendance: 4,339

17 September 2011 9	Yeovil Town	2–3	Sheffield Wednesday	Huish Park
15:00	Agard 28', 38'; Jones (yellow card) 45+5'; Upson (yellow card) 56'; MacLean (yellow card) 66'; Ehmer (yellow card) 72'		McGoldrick 10'; O'Connor (yellow card) 46'; Bennett 53'; Madine 72'	Attendance: 4,445

24 September 2011 10	Sheffield Wednesday	3–0	Exeter City	Hillsborough Stadium
15:00	Batth (yellow card) 30'; O'Connor 40'; Madine 43', 75' (pen.); R. Johnson (yellow card) 67'		Noble (yellow card) 50'; Nardiello (yellow card) 56'	Attendance: 16,995

1 October 2011 11	Hartlepool United	0–1	Sheffield Wednesday	Victoria Park
15:00	Collins (yellow card) 27'		R. Johnson 33'; Madine (yellow card) 50'; Sedgwick (yellow card) 90+4'	Attendance: 6,800

8 October 2011 12	Sheffield Wednesday	3–1	Chesterfield	Hillsborough Stadium
15:00	Buxton 17'; O'Connor (yellow card) 51'; Madine 59'; Marshall 87'		Downes (yellow card) 25'; Clarke 79'	Attendance: 24,514

16 October 2011 13	Sheffield United	2–2	Sheffield Wednesday	Bramall Lane
12:00	Quinn 11'; Evans 20' (yellow card) 56'; Cresswell (yellow card) 37'; Williamson (yellow card) 65'		Buxton (yellow card) 30'; R. Johnson (yellow card) 65'; O'Grady 82'; Madine 86'	Attendance: 28,136

22 October 2011 14	Sheffield Wednesday	2–0	Colchester United	Hillsborough Stadium
15:00	R. Jones 59'; R. Johnson 70' (yellow card) 77'		Coker (yellow card) 62'; Wilson (yellow card) 70'	Attendance: 17,634

25 October 2011 15	Carlisle United	3–2	Sheffield Wednesday	Brunton Park
19:45	Berrett (yellow card) 18'; Michalik (yellow card) 33'; Noble (yellow card) 41' (goal) 64'; Miller 50'; Loy 56'		R. Jones (yellow card) 12' (goal) 88'; Marshall 35'; Madine (yellow card) 57' (yellow-red card) 81'; Lines (yellow card) 86'; O'Connor (yellow card) 60'; J. Johnson (yellow card) 90+3'	Attendance: 6,058

29 October 2011 16	Wycombe Wanderers	1–2	Sheffield Wednesday	Adams Park
15:00	Ibe 29' (yellow card) 31'; Ainsworth (yellow card) 31' (yellow-red card) 73'; Winfield (yellow card) 89'		Semedo 23'; Lowe 35'; Marshall (yellow card) 36'	Attendance: 6,448

5 November 2011 17	Sheffield Wednesday	0–0	Brentford	Hillsborough Stadium
15:00	Batth (yellow card) 30'		Eger (yellow card) 45'; O'Connor (yellow card) 50'; Lee (yellow card) 87'	Attendance: 18,107

19 November 2011 18	Tranmere Rovers	1–2	Sheffield Wednesday	Prenton Park
15:00	Welsh (yellow card) 16'; Baxter 38'; Weir (yellow card) 58'		Lines 45+1'; R. Jones (yellow card) 72'; Batth (yellow card) 77'; Lowe 80'	Attendance: 6,652

26 November 2011 19	Sheffield Wednesday	1–0	Leyton Orient	Hillsborough Stadium
15:00	R. Johnson 19'			Attendance: 18,355

10 December 2011 20	Oldham Athletic	0–2	Sheffield Wednesday	Boundary Park
15:00	Parker (yellow card) 68'; Kuqi (yellow card) 84'		R. Jones (yellow card) 36'; Semedo (yellow card) 59'; Prutton 62'; Tavernier (yellow card) 79'; Lowe 84' (pen.)	Attendance: 7,060

17 December 2011 21	Sheffield Wednesday	4–4	Huddersfield Town	Hillsborough Stadium
15:00	R. Jones 26'; R. Johnson 28'; Watt (yellow card) 45+3'; Batth (yellow card) 50'; Marshall 63'; O'Grady 74'; Lowe (yellow card) 78'; Lines (yellow card) 90+1'; Semedo (yellow card) 90+3'		Rhodes 12', 16', 77', 90+7'; Clarke (yellow card) 21'; Bruce (yellow card) 52'; Miller (yellow card) 74'; Gobern (yellow card) 84'	Attendance: 28,600

26 December 2011 22	Walsall	2–1	Sheffield Wednesday	Bescot Stadium
15:00	Beevers (yellow card) 66'; Gnakpa (yellow card) 79' (goal) 90+1'; Smith 90+4'		Lowe 60'; Marshall (yellow card) 66'	Attendance: 8,603

31 December 2011 23	Preston North End	0–2	Sheffield Wednesday	Deepdale Stadium
13:00			Batth 4'; Marshall 42'	Attendance: 15,904

2 January 2012 24	Sheffield Wednesday	2–1	Tranmere Rovers	Hillsborough Stadium
15:00	R. Johnson 2' (yellow card) 56'; Lines 7'; Semedo (yellow card) 87'		Goodison 82'	Attendance: 24,254

14 January 2012 25	Sheffield Wednesday	0–1	Charlton Athletic	Hillsborough Stadium
15:00	Madine (yellow card) 29'; Semedo (yellow card) 78'; R. Jones (yellow card) 81'		Jackson 28'; Kermorgant (yellow card) 42'	Attendance: 26,759

21 January 2012 26	Sheffield Wednesday	2–2	Hartlepool United	Hillsborough Stadium
15:00	J. Johnson 58'; Madine 75'		Hartley (yellow card) 38' (goal) 47'; Horwood (yellow card) 59'; Liddle (yellow card) 71'; Sweeney 87'	Attendance: 17,469

24 January 2012 27	Scunthorpe United	1–3	Sheffield Wednesday	Glanford Park
19:45	Robertson 55'; Walker (yellow card) 75'		O'Grady 1', 18'; D. Jones (yellow card) 15'; J. Johnson 47'; Madine (yellow card) 51'; Palmer (yellow card) 52'	Attendance: 5,727

31 January 2012 28	Milton Keynes Dons	1–1	Sheffield Wednesday	Stadium mk
19:45	Bywater 17' (o.g.); Flanagan (yellow card) 58'; Lewington (yellow card) 73'		MacKenzie 27' (o.g.); Semedo (yellow card) 55'; Sedgwick (yellow card) 58'; R. Johnson (yellow card) 90'	Attendance: 9,776

4 February 2012 29	Sheffield Wednesday	2–1	Yeovil Town	Hillsborough Stadium
15:00	R. Johnson (yellow card) 21' (goal) 80'; J. Johnson 57' (yellow card) 89'; Lowe (yellow card) 90+3'		Upson (yellow card) 28'; Obika 41'	Attendance: 17,213

11 February 2012 30	Exeter City	2–1	Sheffield Wednesday	St James Park
15:00	Jones 68'; Nardiello (yellow card) 74'; Noble 84'		J. Johnson 65' (yellow card) 84'	Attendance: 5,555

14 February 2012 31	Sheffield Wednesday	0–1	Stevenage	Hillsborough Stadium
19:45	Lines (yellow card) 31'; R. Jones (yellow card) 90'; Batth (yellow card) 90+4'		Roberts (yellow card) 13'; Laird 45'; Ashton (yellow card) 78'	Attendance: 16,185

18 February 2012 32	Chesterfield	1–0	Sheffield Wednesday	B2net Stadium
13:00	Morgan 78' (pen.)		Lowe (yellow card) 20'; Bostock (yellow card) 87'	Attendance: 9,279

26 February 2012 33	Sheffield Wednesday	1–0	Sheffield United	Hillsborough Stadium
13:00	O'Grady 73'			Attendance: 36,364

3 March 2012 34	Rochdale	0–0	Sheffield Wednesday	Spotland Stadium
15:00	Jones (penalty missed) 79'			Attendance: 5,361

6 March 2012 35	Sheffield Wednesday	4–1	Bury	Hillsborough Stadium
19:45	Antonio 11', 58'; Madine 51'; Lowe 64'		Worrall (yellow card) 43'; Schumacher 72'	Attendance: 17,684

10 March 2012 36	Sheffield Wednesday	3–0	Bournemouth	Hillsborough Stadium
15:00	Batth 4'; Addison 9' (o.g.); Antonio 10'; R. Jones (yellow card) 78'			Attendance: 19,416

17 March 2012 37	Notts County	1–2	Sheffield Wednesday	Meadow Lane
15:00	Chilvers (yellow card) 42'; Sheehan (yellow card) 45'; Sam 88'		Lowe 53'; Madine 66'; O'Grady (yellow card) 89'	Attendance: 12,410

20 March 2012 38	Sheffield Wednesday	2–2	Walsall	Hillsborough Stadium
19:45	Lowe 60'; Semedo (yellow card) 90+3'; Madine 90+5'		Smith (yellow card) 39'; Macken 58' (yellow card) 90'; Paterson 73'; Hurst (yellow card) 80'	Attendance: 18,869

24 March 2012 39	Leyton Orient	0–1	Sheffield Wednesday	Matchroom Stadium
15:00			R. Johnson 49' (yellow card) 69'	Attendance: 6,196

31 March 2012 40	Sheffield Wednesday	2–0	Preston North End	Hillsborough Stadium
12:45 (Live on Sky Sports)	Madine 49', 64' (yellow card) 84'; Lines (yellow card) 68'; R. Jones (yellow card) 88'		Wright (yellow card) 19'; Ehmer (yellow card) 27'; Parry (yellow card) 58'	Attendance: 18069

7 April 2012 41	Huddersfield Town	0–2	Sheffield Wednesday	Galpharm Stadium
12:30			Batth (yellow card) 44'; Llera 54' (yellow card) 90+2'; Ranger 72'	Attendance: 18646

9 April 2012 42	Sheffield Wednesday	3–0	Oldham Athletic	Hillsborough Stadium
12:45 (Live on Sky Sports)	Madine 43'; Llera 67'; Lowe 80'		Bunn (yellow card) 1'	Attendance: 22,232

14 April 2012 43	Colchester United	1–1	Sheffield Wednesday	Colchester Community Stadium
15:00	Henderson 3'; Gillespie (yellow card) 44'; Wordsworth (yellow card) 54'; Izzet (yellow card) 70'		Llera 52' (yellow card) 71'; Ranger (yellow card) 62'	Attendance: 6,643

21 April 2012 44	Sheffield Wednesday	2–1	Carlisle United	Hillsborough Stadium
15:00	Lines 26'; Antonio 90+5'; Ranger (yellow card) 90+8'		Murphy (yellow card) 9'; Simek (yellow card) 39'; Berrett 82'; Noble (yellow card) 90+7'	Attendance: 21,934

28 April 2012 45	Brentford	1–2	Sheffield Wednesday	Griffin Park
15:00	Douglas (yellow card) 33'; Donaldson 62' (pen.)		Beevers (yellow card) 27'; Treacy 38'; Llera (yellow card) 58' (goal) 66'; Buxton (yellow card) 90+3'	Attendance: 7,381

5 May 2012 46	Sheffield Wednesday*	2–0	Wycombe Wanderers	Hillsborough Stadium
15:00	Antonio 25'; Ranger 52' (yellow card) 53'		Bloomfield (yellow card) 28'; Eastmond (yellow card) 40'; Lewis (yellow card) 83'	Attendance: 38,082
Note: *Sheffield Wednesday are promoted to the Football League Championship.

=== FA Cup ===
13 November 2011 First round	Morecambe	1–2	Sheffield Wednesday	Morecambe
15:15 (Live on ESPN)	Wilson 62' (pen.)	Report	Lines 18'; O'Grady 52'	Stadium: Globe Arena; Attendance: 4,160; Referee: David Webb

3 December 2011 Second round	Sheffield Wednesday	1–0	Aldershot Town	Sheffield
15:00	Lowe 49'; Bennett (yellow card) 83'	Report		Stadium: Hillsborough; Attendance: 10,162; Referee: Graham Salisbury

8 January 2012 Third round	Sheffield Wednesday	1–0	West Ham United	Sheffield
15:00	O'Grady 88'; Morrison (yellow card) 90'	Report	O'Neil (yellow card) 17'; Baldock (penalty missed) 49'; McCartney (yellow card) 72'; Potts (yellow card) 90+10'	Stadium: Hillsborough; Attendance: 17,916; Referee: Keith Stroud

28 January 2012 Fourth round	Blackpool	1–1	Sheffield Wednesday	Blackpool
15:00	Dicko (yellow card) 88'; K. Phillips 90+3' (pen.)		Morrison 52'; Lines (yellow card) 85'; Batth (yellow card) 90+1'	Stadium: Bloomfield Road; Attendance: 14,042; Referee: David Deadman

7 February 2012 Fourth round replay	Sheffield Wednesday	0–3	Blackpool	Sheffield
19:45 (Live on ESPN)	Sedgwick (yellow card) 27'; R. Johnson (yellow card) 45'		M. Phillips 7'; LuaLua 14'; Sylvestre 54'	Stadium: Hillsborough Stadium; Attendance: 10,274; Referee: Andy D'Urso

=== League Cup ===
11 August 2011 First round	Sheffield Wednesday	0–0 (a.e.t.) (4–2 p)	Blackpool	Hillsborough Stadium
19:45 (Live on ESPN)	Reynolds (yellow card) 31'; Tumilty (yellow card) 77'; Coke (yellow card) 103'	Report	Eastham (red card) 78'; Clarke (yellow card) 112'	Attendance: 5,240
	Penalties
	Palmer (penalty scored); Otsemobor (penalty scored); Morrison (penalty scored); O'Connor (penalty scored)		Clarke (penalty missed); Eardley (penalty missed); Sylvestre (penalty scored); Llera (penalty scored)

24 August 2011 Second round	Blackburn Rovers	3–1	Sheffield Wednesday	Ewood Park
20:00	Rochina 3', 4'; Goodwillie 7'		Madine (yellow card) 45'; Morrison 50'; R. Johnson (yellow card) 57'; Lines (yellow card) 78'	Attendance: 8,607

=== Football League Trophy ===
30 August 2011 First round	Bradford City	0–0 (3–1 p)	Sheffield Wednesday	Valley Parade
19:45 (Live on ESPN)	Flynn (yellow card) 85'			Attendance: 3,519
	Penalties
	Jones (penalty scored); Flynn (penalty scored); Hannah (penalty scored)		Morrison (penalty missed); Palmer (penalty missed); Coke (penalty scored); Sedgwick (penalty missed)

== Transfers ==
Players transferred in
Date	Pos.	Name	From	Fee	Ref.
7 July 2011	DF	(Portugal) José Semedo	(England) Charlton Athletic	Free Transfer	
24 May 2011	MF	(England) David Prutton	(England) Swindon Town	Free Transfer	
24 May 2011	DF	(England) Rob Jones	(England) Scunthorpe United	Free Transfer	
5 July 2011	DF	(England) Julian Bennett	(England) Nottingham Forest	Free Transfer	
10 August 2011	ST	(England) Chris O'Grady	(England) Rochdale	Undisclosed	
12 August 2011	MF	(England) Chris Lines	(England) Bristol Rovers	£50,000	
30 August 2011	ST	(England) Ryan Lowe	(England) Bury	Undisclosed	
1 January 2012	GK	(England) Stephen Bywater	Free Agent	N/A	
10 January 2012	DF	(Spain) Miguel Llera	(England) Blackpool	Free	
13 January 2012	MF	(England) Mike Jones	(England) Bury	Undisclosed	
Players transferred out
Date	Pos.	Name	To	Fee	Ref.
24 June 2011	MF	(Republic of Ireland) Darren Potter	(England) Milton Keynes Dons	Free	
1 July 2011	MF	(Scotland) Gary Teale	(Scotland) St Mirren	Free	
7 July 2011	MF	(England) Tommy Miller	(England) Huddersfield Town	Free	
8 July 2011	DF	(England) Michael Morrison	(England) Charlton Athletic	Undisclosed	
10 May 2011	DF	(England) Richard Hinds	Unattached	Free	
28 June 2011	DF	(England) Tommy Spurr	(England) Doncaster Rovers	Undisclosed	
15 June 2011	ST	(Republic of Ireland) Paul Heffernan	(Scotland) Kilmarnock	Free	
11 January 2012	MF	(Republic of Ireland) James O'Connor	(United States) Orlando City	Free	
Players loaned in
Date from	Pos.	Name	From	Date to	Ref.
26 July 2011	DF	(England) Danny Batth	(England) Wolverhampton Wanderers	3 January 2012	
11 August 2011	FW	(Nigeria) Danny Uchechi	(Belgium) FC Dender	February 2011	
17 August 2011	MF	(England) Ben Marshall	(England) Stoke City	January 2012	
30 August 2011	DF	(Slovenia) David Kašnik	(Slovenia) Olimpija Ljubljana	February 2012	
15 September 2011	FW	(England) David McGoldrick	(England) Nottingham Forest	15 October 2011	
20 September 2011	GK	(England) Stephen Bywater	(England) Derby County	17 December 2011	
21 November 2011	DF	(England) James Tavernier	(England) Newcastle United	21 January 2012	
23 November 2011	FW	(England) Sanchez Watt	(England) Arsenal	16 January 2012	
21 December 2011	DF	(England) Danny Batth	(England) Wolverhampton Wanderers	End of the season	
30 January 2012	MF	(England) John Bostock	(England) Tottenham Hotspur	End of the season (recalled on 19 March 2012)	
21 February 2012	MF	(England) Michail Antonio	(England) Reading	End of the season	
22 March 2012	MF	(Republic of Ireland) Keith Treacy	(England) Burnley	End of the season	
22 March 2012	FW	(England) Nile Ranger	(England) Newcastle United	End of the season	
Players loaned out
Date from	Pos.	Name	To	Date to	Ref.
31 August 2011	DF	(England) Mark Beevers	(England) Milton Keynes Dons	31 December 2011	
31 August 2011	MF	(England) Giles Coke	(England) Bury	31 October 2011	
24 September 2011	FW	(Republic of Ireland) Clinton Morrison	(England) Milton Keynes Dons	24 October 2011	
6 January 2012	DF	(Scotland) Mark Reynolds	(Scotland) Aberdeen	End of the season	
10 January 2012	GK	(England) Sean Cuff	(England) Cambridge United	10 February 2012	
13 January 2012	MF	(England) Giles Coke	(England) Bury	End of the season	
24 February 2012	GK	(England) Richard O'Donnell	(England) Macclesfield Town	22 March 2012	
16 March 2012	GK	(England) Sean Cuff	(England) Worksop Town	End of the season	
20 March 2012	GK	(England) Richard O'Donnell	(England) Macclesfield Town	End of the season	
22 March 2012	FW	(Republic of Ireland) Clinton Morrison	(England) Brentford	End of the season	
23 March 2012	MF	(Zimbabwe) Cecil Nyoni	(England) Frickley Athletic	End of the season	

== Awards ==
=== Sheffield Wednesday End of Season Awards ===
Award	Winner	Ref
Player of the Year	(Portugal) Jose Semedo	
Players' Player of the Year	(Portugal) Jose Semedo	
Goal of the Season	(England) Chris O'Grady (v. Sheffield United, 26 February 2012)	
Outstanding Contribution	(Serbia) Milan Mandaric	
Owls' Player in the Community	(England) Rob Jones	
Academy Player of the Year	(Australia) Jarrod Kyle	

=== PFA Fans' League One Player of the Season ===
Pos	Player	Ref
MF	(Portugal) Jose Semedo	

=== BBC Football League One Team of the Season ===
Pos	Player	Ref
FW	(England) Gary Madine	

=== Northern Programme Club Independent View Programme of the Month ===
Month	Programme	Match	Ref
May	'Wednesday'	v. Wycombe Wanderers, 5 May 2012	

=== Mascot of the Year 2012 ===
Mascot	Team	Ref
Ozzie Owl	Sheffield Wednesday	

=== Football League One Manager of the Month ===
Month	Manager	Ref
March	(England) Dave Jones	
April	(England) Dave Jones	

=== Football League One Player of the Month ===
Month	Player	Ref
August	(England) Ryan Lowe	
April	(Spain) Miguel Llera	

=== The Football League Young Player of the Month ===
Month	Player	Ref
September	(England) Gary Madine	

=== Wise Old Owls Award ===
Pos	Nat	Player	Ref
1	(Portugal)	Jose Semedo	

=== Sheffield Wednesday Player of the Month Award ===
Month	1st	%	2nd	%	3rd	%	4th	%
August	(England) Lewis Buxton	51%	(England) David Prutton	34%	(Scotland) Liam Palmer	9%	(England) Julian Bennett	6%
September	(England) Gary Madine	77%	(England) Lewis Buxton	11%	(Portugal) Jose Semedo	7%	(England) Ben Marshall	5%
October	(England) Ben Marshall	50%	(Portugal) Jose Semedo	25%	(Benin) Reda Johnson (England) Rob Jones	12.5%		
November	(Portugal) Jose Semedo	50%	(Benin) Reda Johnson	39%	(England) Chris Lines	9%	(England) Chris O'Grady	2%
December	(England) Ben Marshall	41%	(Benin) Reda Johnson	32%	(England) Chris Lines	22%	(England) Danny Batth	5%
January	(England) Chris O'Grady	61%	(Jamaica) Jermaine Johnson (Spain) Miguel Llera	16%	(England) Clinton Morrison	6%		
February	(Jamaica) Jermaine Johnson	39%	(England) Chris O'Grady	31%	(England) Danny Batth	23%	(England) Lewis Buxton	7%
March	(England) Michail Antonio	81%	(England) Danny Batth	12%	(Portugal) Jose Semedo	4%	(England) Rob Jones	3%

=== Football League One Team of the Week ===
Week	Player(s)
6/7 Aug	(England) Rob Jones, (England) David Prutton
10/11 Sep	(England) Gary Madine
17 Sep	(Benin) Reda Johnson
23/24 Sep	(England) Stephen Bywater, (England) Lewis Buxton, (England) Gary Madine
30 Sep, 1/2 Oct	(Benin) Reda Johnson
9/10 Oct	(England) Lewis Buxton
22/23 Oct	(England) Rob Jones, (Benin) Reda Johnson
25/26 Nov	(Benin) Reda Johnson
10 Dec	(England) Stephen Bywater
16/17 Dec	(England) Chris O'Grady
2 Jan	(England) Chris Lines
4 Feb	(Portugal) Jose Semedo, (Jamaica) Jermaine Johnson
11 Feb	(Jamaica) Jermaine Johnson
25/26 Feb	(England) Stephen Bywater
10/11 Mar	(England) Danny Batth, (England) Michail Antonio
25 Mar	(Portugal) Jose Semedo
30/31 Mar	(England) Lewis Buxton
6/9 Apr	(Spain) Miguel Llera
20/21 Apr	(England) Michail Antonio, (England) Chris Lines
28 Apr	(Republic of Ireland) Keith Treacy
5 May	(England) Stephen Bywater, (England) Danny Batth, (England) Michail Antonio

=== Sheffield Wednesday Man of the Matches ===
Date	Opposition	Man of the Match
06.08.11	Rochdale	(England) David Prutton
11.08.11	Blackpool	(Republic of Ireland) James O'Connor
13.08.11	Bournemouth	(Scotland) Liam Palmer
16.08.11	Bury	(England) Lewis Buxton
20.08.11	Notts County	(England) Ben Marshall
24.08.11	Blackburn Rovers	(Scotland) Liam Palmer
27.08.11	Scunthorpe United	(England) Gary Madine
30.08.11	Bradford City	(England) Richard O'Donnell
06.09.11	Charlton Athletic	(Republic of Ireland) Clinton Morrison
10.09.11	Milton Keynes Dons	(England) Gary Madine
13.09.11	Stevenage	(England) Gary Madine
17.09.11	Yeovil Town	(England) Ben Marshall
24.09.11	Exeter City	(England) Chris Lines
01.10.11	Hartlepool United	(Benin) Réda Johnson
08.10.11	Chesterfield	(England) Ben Marshall
16.10.11	Sheffield United	(England) Ben Marshall
22.10.11	Colchester United	(England) Rob Jones
25.10.11	Carlisle United	(Portugal) José Semedo
29.10.11	Wycombe Wanderers	(Portugal) José Semedo
05.11.11	Brentford	(England) Ben Marshall
13.11.11	Morecambe	(England) Chris Lines
19.11.11	Tranmere Rovers	(Portugal) José Semedo
26.11.11	Leyton Orient	(Benin) Réda Johnson
03.12.11	Aldershot Town	(England) Chris O'Grady
10.12.11	Oldham Athletic	(England) Rob Jones
17.12.11	Huddersfield Town	(England) Chris O'Grady
26.12.11	Walsall	(Benin) Réda Johnson
31.12.11	Preston North End	(Portugal) José Semedo
02.01.12	Tranmere Rovers	(Spain) Miguel Llera
08.01.12	West Ham United	(England) Chris O'Grady
14.01.12	Charlton Athletic	(England) Nicky Weaver
21.01.12	Hartlepool United	(Jamaica) Jermaine Johnson
24.01.12	Scunthorpe United	(England) Chris O'Grady
28.01.12	Blackpool	(England) Stephen Bywater
31.01.12	Milton Keynes Dons	(Spain) Miguel Llera
04.02.12	Yeovil Town	(Jamaica) Jermaine Johnson
07.02.12	Blackpool	(England) Danny Batth
11.02.12	Exeter City	(Spain) Miguel Llera
14.02.12	Stevenage	(Jamaica) Jermaine Johnson
18.02.12	Chesterfield	(England) Danny Batth
26.02.12	Sheffield United	(England) Danny Batth
03.03.12	Rochdale	(England) Danny Batth
06.03.12	Bury	(England) Michail Antonio
10.03.12	Bournemouth	(England) Michail Antonio
17.03.12	Notts County	(England) Michail Antonio
20.03.12	Walsall	(England) Michail Antonio
24.03.12	Leyton Orient	(Spain) Miguel Llera
31.03.12	Preston North End	(England) Gary Madine
07.04.12	Huddersfield Town	(Spain) Miguel Llera
09.04.12	Oldham Athletic	(Spain) Miguel Llera
14.04.12	Colchester United	(England) Mark Beevers
21.04.12	Carlisle United	(England) Michail Antonio
28.04.12	Brentford	(Republic of Ireland) Keith Treacy
05.05.12	Wycombe Wanderers	(England) Michail Antonio

=== League Football Education Goal of the Season ===
Place	Pos	Player	Ref
1st	FW	(Australia) Jarrod Kyle	
3rd	DF	(England) Tom Rowbotham	

=== League Football Education Goal of the Month ===
Month	Player	ref
March	(England) Tom Rowbotham	
April	(Australia) Jarrod Kyle	

== Competitions ==
=== Overall ===
Competition	Started Round	Current Pos/Round	Final Pos/Round	First Match	Last Match
League One		2nd	2nd	6 August 2011	5 May 2012
FA Cup	Round 1	Round 4 Replay	Round 4 Replay	13 November 2011	7 February 2012
League Cup	Round 1	Round 2	Round 2	11 August 2011	24 August 2012
League Trophy	Round 1	Round 1	Round 1	30 August 2011	30 August 2011

=== League One ===
==== Classification ====
Pos	Team	Pld	W	D	L	GF	GA	GD	Pts	Promotion, qualification or relegation
1	Charlton Athletic (C, P)	46	30	11	5	82	36	+46	101	Promotion to Football League Championship
2	Sheffield Wednesday (P)	46	28	9	9	81	48	+33	93	Promotion to Football League Championship
3	Sheffield United	46	27	9	10	92	51	+41	90	Qualification for League One play-offs (Note: Four teams play for one spot and promotion to Football League Championship.)
4	Huddersfield Town (O, P)	46	21	18	7	79	47	+32	81	Qualification for League One play-offs
5	Milton Keynes Dons	46	22	14	10	84	47	+37	80	Qualification for League One play-offs

Updated to match(es) played on 5 May 2012. Source: BBC Sport
Rules for classification: 1) Points; 2) Goal difference; 3) Number of goals scored
(C) Champions; (O) Play-off winners; (P) Promoted

==== Results summary ====
Overall								Home						Away					
Pld	W	D	L	GF	GA	GD	Pts	W	D	L	GF	GA	GD	W	D	L	GF	GA	GD
46	28	9	9	81	48	+33	93	17	4	2	48	19	+29	11	5	7	33	29	+4

Last updated: 5 May 2012.
Source: The Football League

==== Results by round ====
Round	1	2	3	4	5	6	7	8	9	10	11	12	13	14	15	16	17	18	19	20	21	22	23	24	25	26	27	28	29	30	31	32	33	34	35	36	37	38	39	40	41	42	43	44	45	46
Ground	H	A	A	H	H	A	H	A	A	H	A	H	A	H	A	A	H	A	H	A	H	A	A	H	H	H	A	A	H	A	H	A	H	A	H	H	A	H	A	H	A	H	A	H	A	H
Result	W	L	L	W	W	D	W	L	W	W	W	W	D	W	L	W	D	W	W	W	D	L	W	W	L	D	W	D	W	L	L	L	W	D	W	W	W	D	W	W	W	W	D	W	W	W
Position	6	10	16	12	9	9	8	10	9	7	4	2	3	3	3	3	3	3	2	2	2	2	3	2	4	4	4	3	2	2	3	3	3	3	3	3	3	3	2	3	3	2	3	3	2	2

Updated to match(es) played on 22 June 2012. Source: Competitive Matches
A = Away; H = Home; W = Win; D = Draw; L = Loss
