= 2010–11 Sheffield Wednesday F.C. season =

English football club season

Sheffield Wednesday
2010–11 season
- Chairman: Milan Mandarić
- Manager: Alan Irvine (until 3 February 2011); Gary Megson (from 4 February 2011)
- Stadium: Hillsborough Stadium
- Football League One: 15th
- FA Cup: Fifth round
- League Cup: Second round
- Football League Trophy: Northern Area semi-finals
- Top goalscorer: League: Neil Mellor (13); All: Neil Mellor (19)
- Highest home attendance: 23,081 (League)
- Lowest home attendance: 7,390 (League Cup)
- Average home league attendance: 17,817
Home colours	Away colours

The 2010–11 season was Sheffield Wednesday's first season in the third tier of English football since 2005 and their 109th season in the Football League.

== Events ==
- 7 August 2010 – Sheffield Wednesday start their season with a comfortable home win over Dagenham and Redbridge at Hillsborough.
- 10 August 2010 – Sheffield Wednesday progress to the second round of the League Cup after beating Bury 1–0 at Hillsborough. The game was watched by 7,390 fans.
- 11 August 2010 – Sheffield Wednesday are given 28 days to pay a £550,000 debt before potentially going into administration.
- 24 August 2010 – Sheffield Wednesday are knocked out of the League Cup after a 4–2 loss at Scunthorpe United.
- 9 November 2010 – Wednesday face a winding-up order over £600,000 of unpaid PAYE tax and also face a similar order over a £300,000 VAT bill.
- 17 November 2010 – A High Court judge gives the club 28 days to find new owners and pay off their tax debt.
- 29 November 2010 – Milan Mandaric's UK Football Investments buys the club for £7,000,001 pending shareholder approval. The deal would settle the club's £23 million debt with the Co-Operative Bank with a £7 million payment. An Extraordinary General Meeting of shareholders is called for 14 December.
- 30 November 2010 – Wednesday are knocked out of the Football League Trophy after a 3–1 loss at Carlisle United.
- 3 February 2011 – Alan Irvine is sacked as manager after 13 months in charge. The club were 12th in the table at the time.
- 4 February 2011 – Gary Megson is appointed as manager.
- 19 February 2011 – Wednesday reach the fifth round of the FA Cup for the first time in 11 years, but are knocked out by Birmingham City.
- 7 May 2011 – A loss to Exeter City in the final game of the season leaves Wednesday 15th in the final league table.

== League table ==
Pos	Team	Pld	W	D	L	GF	GA	GD	Pts
13	Charlton Athletic	46	15	14	17	62	66	−4	59
14	Yeovil Town	46	16	11	19	56	66	−10	59
15	Sheffield Wednesday	46	16	10	20	67	67	0	58
16	Hartlepool United	46	15	12	19	47	65	−18	57
17	Oldham Athletic	46	13	17	16	53	60	−7	56

Updated to match(es) played on 2 May 2011. Source: BBC
Rules for classification: 1) points; 2) goal difference; 3) number of goals scored.

== Results ==
=== League One ===
League One match details
Date	Opponents	Venue	Result	Score F–A	Scorers	Attendance	League position	Ref.
7 August 2010	Dagenham & Redbridge	Home	W	2–0	Doe 13' o.g., Morrison 15'	23,081	3rd	
14 August 2010	Colchester United	Away	D	1–1	Mellor 83'	6,011	4th	
21 August 2010	Brighton & Hove Albion	Home	W	1–0	Coke 38'	18,674	4th	
28 August 2010	Hartlepool United	Away	W	5–0	Murray 8' o.g., Coke 10', Mellor 23', Tudgay 73' pen., Morrison 90+3'	4,084	1st	
5 September 2010	Brentford	Away	L	0–1		5,396	1st	
11 September 2010	Carlisle United	Home	L	0–1		20,282	8th	
18 September 2010	Plymouth Argyle	Away	L	2–3	O'Connor 38', Miller 75'	7,916	11th	
25 September 2010	Southampton	Home	L	0–1		18,198	14th	
28 September 2010	Oldham Athletic	Home	D	0–0		16,609	16th	
2 October 2010	Notts County	Away	W	2–0	Tudgay 52', Potter 90+6'	11,355	10th	
9 October 2010	Leyton Orient	Home	W	1–0	Buxton 52'	17,445	5th	
16 October 2010	Yeovil Town	Away	W	2–0	J. Johnson 72', Miller 84' pen.	5,927	4th	
23 October 2010	Bournemouth	Home	D	1–1	Mellor 82'	17,868	4th	
30 October 2010	Charlton Athletic	Away	L	0–1		17,365	7th	
2 November 2010	Huddersfield Town	Home	L	0–2		20,540	11th	
13 November 2010	Rochdale	Home	W	2–0	Coke 62', Morrison 82'	16,520	10th	
20 November 2010	Milton Keynes Dons	Away	W	4–1	Mellor 22', 71', 83', Chadwick 27' o.g.	10,552	6th	
23 November 2010	Walsall	Home	W	3–0	Potter 7', Beevers 75', Morrison 83'	15,228	4th	
4 December 2010	Swindon Town	Away	L	1–2	Morrison 30'	9,123	5th	
11 December 2010	Bristol Rovers	Home	W	6–2	Sedgwick 10', Miller 23', Teale 26', J. Johnson 32', O'Connor 71', Heffernan 81'	19,242	2nd	
18 December 2010	Exeter City	Away	L	1–5	Miller 31'	5,524	5th	
3 January 2011	Huddersfield Town	Away	L	0–1		17,024	7th	
15 January 2011	Charlton Athletic	Home	D	2–2	Heffernan 47', R. Johnson 51'	19,051	9th	
22 January 2011	Leyton Orient	Away	L	0–4		6,449	11th	
25 January 2011	Yeovil Town	Home	D	2–2	Madine 36', R. Johnson 86'	16,618	11th	
1 February 2011	Peterborough United	Away	L	3–5	J. Johnson 5', Madine 21', Sedgwick 35'	6,480	12th	
5 February 2011	Milton Keynes Dons	Home	D	2–2	Mellor 69', Morrison 83'	17,631	12th	
12 February 2011	Rochdale	Away	L	1–2	Madine 90'	6,154	14th	
15 February 2011 (Note: Match originally scheduled for 26 December 2010 but postponed due to a frozen pitch.)	Tranmere Rovers	Away	L	0–3		5,941	16th	
22 February 2011	Bournemouth	Away	D	0–0		7,268	16th	
26 February 2011	Carlisle United	Away	W	1–0	Miller 20'	6,834	16th	
5 March 2011	Plymouth Argyle	Home	L	2–4	Coke 61', R. Johnson 83'	18,474	16th	
8 March 2011	Oldham Athletic	Away	W	3–2	Beevers 3', Sedgwick 13', 52'	4,133	15th	
12 March 2011	Notts County	Home	L	0–1		17,835	16th	
15 March 2011	Peterborough United	Home	L	1–4	Heffernan 52'	16,014	16th	
19 March 2011	Southampton	Away	L	0–2		20,234	16th	
26 March 2011	Dagenham & Redbridge	Away	D	1–1	Teale 17'	3,549	16th	
29 March 2011	Brentford	Home	L	1–3	Jones 12'	14,797	17th	
2 April 2011	Colchester United	Home	W	2–1	Mellor 25', 51'	15,663	16th	
5 April 2011	Tranmere Rovers	Home	W	4–0	Miller 10', 22' pen., Madine 14', Mellor 90+2'	15,235	15th	
9 April 2011	Brighton & Hove Albion	Away	L	0–2		8,107	16th	
16 April 2011	Hartlepool United	Home	W	2–0	Miller 45+2 pen., Madine 65'	16,358	15th	
23 April 2011	Walsall	Away	D	1–1	Mellor 26'	2,072	15th	
25 April 2011	Swindon Town	Home	W	3–1	Potter 17', Mellor 28', 53'	17,348	14th	
30 April 2011	Bristol Rovers	Away	D	1–1	Miller 3' pen.	8,340	13th	
7 May 2011	Exeter City	Home	L	1–2	J. Johnson 13'	21,085	15th	

=== FA Cup ===
FA Cup match details
Round	Date	Opponents	Venue	Result	Score F–A	Scorers	Attendance	Ref.
First round	7 November 2010	Southport	Away	W	5–2	Teale 11', Mellor 54', Morrison 61', 62', Spurr 64'	4,490	
Second round	27 November 2010	Northampton Town	Home	W	3–2	Beevers 6', Miller 37 pen., 90+2' pen.	8,932	
Third round	8 January 2011	Bristol City	Away	W	3–0	Teale 49', Mellor 55', Morrison 65'	11,387	
Fourth round	29 January 2011	Hereford United	Home	W	4–1	Potter 15', Morrison 69' pen., 79' pen., J. Johnson 77'	16,578	
Fifth round	19 February 2011	Birmingham City	Away	L	0–3		14,607	

=== League Cup ===
League Cup match details
Round	Date	Opponents	Venue	Result	Score F–A	Scorers	Attendance	Ref.
First round	10 August 2010	Bury	Home	W	1–0	Coke 60'	7,390	
Second round	24 August 2010	Scunthorpe United	Away	L	2–4	Tudgay 74' pen., Mellor 83'	4,680	

=== Football League Trophy ===
Football League Trophy match details
Round	Date	Opponents	Venue	Result	Score F–A	Scorers	Attendance	Ref.
First round	1 September 2010	Notts County	Home	W	2–1	O'Connor 2', 14'	10,551	
Second round	6 October 2010	Chesterfield	Home	D	2–2 (8–7 p)	Mellor 12', Tudgay 90'	15,003	
Area quarter-finals	10 November 2010	Hartlepool United	Home	W	4–1	Mellor 9', 29', 48' pen., Teale 55'	10,909	
Area semi-finals	30 November 2010	Carlisle United	Away	L	1–3	Purse 85'	3,149	

== Players ==
=== First-team squad ===
Squad at end of season

Note: Flags indicate national team as defined under FIFA eligibility rules; some limited exceptions apply. Players may hold more than one non-FIFA nationality.

No.	Pos.	Nation	Player
1	GK	ENG	Nicky Weaver
2	DF	ENG	Tommy Spurr
3	DF	ENG	Lewis Buxton
5	DF	ENG	Richard Hinds
6	DF	ENG	Michael Morrison
7	DF	SCO	Mark Reynolds
8	MF	ENG	Tommy Miller
9	FW	IRL	Paul Heffernan
10	MF	ENG	Giles Coke
11	MF	ENG	Daniel Jones
12	DF	ENG	Danny Batth (on loan from Wolverhampton Wanderers)
13	GK	ENG	Richard O'Donnell
14	MF	IRL	Darren Potter (Note: Potter was born in Liverpool, England, but also qualified to represent the Republic of Ireland internationally and represented the Republic of Ireland at U-21 level before making his international debut for the Republic of Ireland in May 2007.)
15	DF	ENG	Mark Beevers
17	MF	IRL	James O'Connor

No.	Pos.	Nation	Player
18	DF	IRL	Joey O'Brien (on loan from Bolton Wanderers)
21	MF	SCO	Gary Teale
22	DF	BEN	Réda Johnson (Note: Johnson was born in Marseille, France, but also qualified to represent Benin internationally and made his international debut for Benin in February 2009.)
23	MF	JAM	Jermaine Johnson
24	MF	ENG	Chris Sedgwick
25	GK	ENG	Arron Jameson
27	DF	ENG	Rob Jones (on loan from Scunthorpe United)
29	MF	SCO	Liam Palmer (Note: Palmer was born in Worksop, England, but also qualified to represent Scotland internationally through his grandmother, as well as Jamaica, and represented Scotland at U-19 and U-21 level before making his international debut for Scotland in March 2019.)
30	FW	IRL	Clinton Morrison (Note: Morrison was born in Wandsworth, England, but also qualified to represent the Republic of Ireland internationally through his grandmother and made his international debut for the Republic of Ireland in August 2001.)
32	FW	ENG	Gary Madine
33	FW	ENG	Neil Mellor (on loan from Preston North End)
34	GK	ENG	Sean Cuff
35	FM	ZIM	Cecil Nyoni
36	DF	ENG	Jon Otsemobor

=== Left club during season ===
Note: Flags indicate national team as defined under FIFA eligibility rules; some limited exceptions apply. Players may hold more than one non-FIFA nationality.

No.	Pos.	Nation	Player
4	DF	ENG	Darren Purse (captain; released)
4	MF	ENG	Isaiah Osbourne (on loan from Aston Villa)
7	FW	ENG	Marcus Tudgay (to Nottingham Forest)

No.	Pos.	Nation	Player
16	GK	ENG	Lee Nicholls (on loan from Wigan Athletic)
19	MF	ENG	Luke Boden (to Orlando City)
28	FW	ENG	Nathan Modest (on loan to Darlington)

=== Transfers In ===
Date	Nation	Position	Player	Club From	Transfer Fee
7 June 2010	(England)	MF	Chris Sedgwick	Preston North End	Free
8 June 2010	(England)	DF	Jon Otsemobor	Southampton	Free
9 June 2010	(Republic of Ireland)	FW	Paul Heffernan	Doncaster Rovers	Free
11 June 2010	(England)	MF	Daniel Jones	Wolverhampton Wanderers	Free
1 July 2010	(England)	MF	Giles Coke	Motherwell	Free
12 July 2010	(Republic of Ireland)	FW	Clinton Morrison	Coventry City	Free
5 August 2010	(England)	GK	Nicky Weaver	Burnley	Free
4 January 2011	(Benin)	DF	Reda Johnson	Plymouth Argyle	Undisclosed
7 January 2011	(England)	DF	Michael Morrison	Leicester City	Undisclosed
15 January 2011	(England)	FW	Gary Madine	Carlisle United	Undisclosed
15 January 2011	(Scotland)	DF	Mark Reynolds	Motherwell	Undisclosed

=== Transfers Out ===
Date	Nation	Position	Player	Club To	Transfer Fee
11 May 2010	(England)	MF	Michael Gray	None	Retired
20 May 2010	(England)	FW	Akpo Sodje	Charlton Athletic	Undisclosed
21 May 2010	(England)	FW	Leon Clarke	Queens Park Rangers	Free
30 June 2010	(Netherlands)	MF	Etienne Esajas	Free Agency	Released
30 June 2010	(England)	FW	Francis Jeffers	Free Agency	Released
1 July 2010	(United States)	DF	Frank Simek	Carlisle United	Free
27 July 2010	(England)	GK	Lee Grant	Burnley	Undisclosed
29 July 2010	(England)	MF	Sean McAllister	Shrewsbury Town	Free
5 January 2011	(England)	FW	Marcus Tudgay	Nottingham Forest	Undisclosed
21 January 2011	(England)	DF	Darren Purse	Millwall	Free
26 January 2011	(England)	MF	Luke Boden	Free Agency	Released

==== Loans In ====
Date	Nation	Position	Player	Club From	Length
1 July 2010	(England)	FW	Neil Mellor	Preston North End	Full-Season
31 January 2011	(England)	MF	Isaiah Osbourne	Aston Villa	Until end of season
16 March 2011	(England)	DF	Danny Batth	Wolverhampton Wanderers	Until end of season
17 March 2011	(England)	DF	Rob Jones	Scunthorpe United	Until end of season
23 March 2011	(Republic of Ireland)	DF	Joey O'Brien	Bolton Wanderers	Until end of season

==== Loans Out ====
Date	Nation	Position	Player	Club To	Length
25 November 2010	(England)	FW	Marcus Tudgay	Nottingham Forest	Until January
14 January 2011	(England)	FW	Nathan Modest	Darlington	Until end of season

== Statistics ==
=== Appearances and goals ===
				Total			Football League One		FA Cup		Football League Cup		Football League Trophy	
No.	Pos.	Nat.	Name	Sts	App	Gls	App	Gls	App	Gls	App	Gls	App	Gls
1	GK	(England)	Weaver	36	47		36		5		2		4	
2	DF	(England)	Spurr	33	33	1	26		4	1	1		2	
3	DF	(England)	Buxton	31	32	1	30	1					2	
4	DF	(England)	Purse	30	30	1	22		3		1		4	1
5	DF	(England)	Hinds	5	6		4		1		1			
7	ST	(England)	Tudgay	16	22	4	17	2	1		1	1	3	1
8	MF	(England)	Miller	34	41	11	34	9	3	2	1		3	
9	ST	(Republic of Ireland)	Heffernan	6	23	3	17	3	2		2		2	
10	MF	(England)	Coke	26	34	5	27	4	3		1	1	3	
11	DF	(England)	D. Jones	22	34		25		4		2		3	
13	GK	(England)	O'Donnell	8	9		9							
14	MF	(Republic of Ireland)	Potter	29	40	4	33	3	2	1	2		3	
15	DF	(England)	Beevers	34	37	3	28	2	3	1	2		4	
17	MF	(Republic of Ireland)	O'Connor	31	45	4	36	2	4		2		3	2
19	MF	(England)	Boden											
21	MF	(Scotland)	Teale	47	51	5	41	2	5	2	2		3	1
23	MF	(Jamaica)	J. Johnson	17	29	5	26	4	2	1			1	
24	MF	(England)	Sedgwick	30	42	4	33	4	4		1		4	
25	GK	(England)	Jameson	2	2		2							
28	ST	(England)	Modest											
29	MF	(England)	Palmer	5	11		9		1		1			
30	ST	(Republic of Ireland)	C. Morrison	32	46	11	35	6	5	5	2		4	
33	ST	(England)	Mellor	32	43	20	33	13	4	2	2	1	4	4
35	MF	(Zimbabwe)	Nyoni											
36	DF	(England)	Otsemobor	18	21		15		1		2		3	
	DF	(England)	Batth	10	10		10							
	DF	(Benin)	R. Johnson	18	19	3	16	3	3					
	DF	(England)	R. Jones	8	8	1	8	1						
	DF	(England)	M. Morrison	15	15		12		3					
	DF	(Republic of Ireland)	O'Brien	3	4		4							
	MF	(England)	Osbourne	10	11		10		1					
	DF	(Scotland)	Reynolds	8	8		7		1					

Last updated: 19 January 2019
Source: Sheffield Wednesday F.C.
Ordered by number
0 shown as blank

=== Scorers ===
==== All ====
Scorer	Goals
Neil Mellor	20
Clinton Morrison	11
Tommy Miller	11
Giles Coke	5
Jermaine Johnson	5
Gary Teale	5
Marcus Tudgay	4
Darren Potter	4
James O'Connor	4
Chris Sedgwick	4
Paul Heffernan	3
Mark Beevers	3
Reda Johnson	3
Darren Purse	1
Tommy Spurr	1
Lewis Buxton	1
Rob Jones	1

==== League One ====
Scorer	Goals
Neil Mellor	13
Tommy Miller	9
Clinton Morrison	6
Giles Coke	4
Jermaine Johnson	4
Chris Sedgwick	4
Darren Potter	3
Paul Heffernan	3
Reda Johnson	3
Gary Teale	2
James O'Connor	2
Marcus Tudgay	2
Mark Beevers	2
Lewis Buxton	1
Rob Jones	1

==== FA Cup ====
Scorer	Goals
Clinton Morrison	5
Tommy Miller	2
Neil Mellor	2
Gary Teale	2
Mark Beevers	1
Jermaine Johnson	1
Tommy Spurr	1
Darren Potter	1

==== League Cup ====
Scorer	Goals
Giles Coke	1
Neil Mellor	1
Marcus Tudgay	1

==== Football League Trophy ====
Scorer	Goals
Neil Mellor	4
James O'Connor	2
Darren Purse	1
Gary Teale	1
Marcus Tudgay	1

As of games played 7 May 2011
