= Réda Johnson =

Footballer (born 1988)

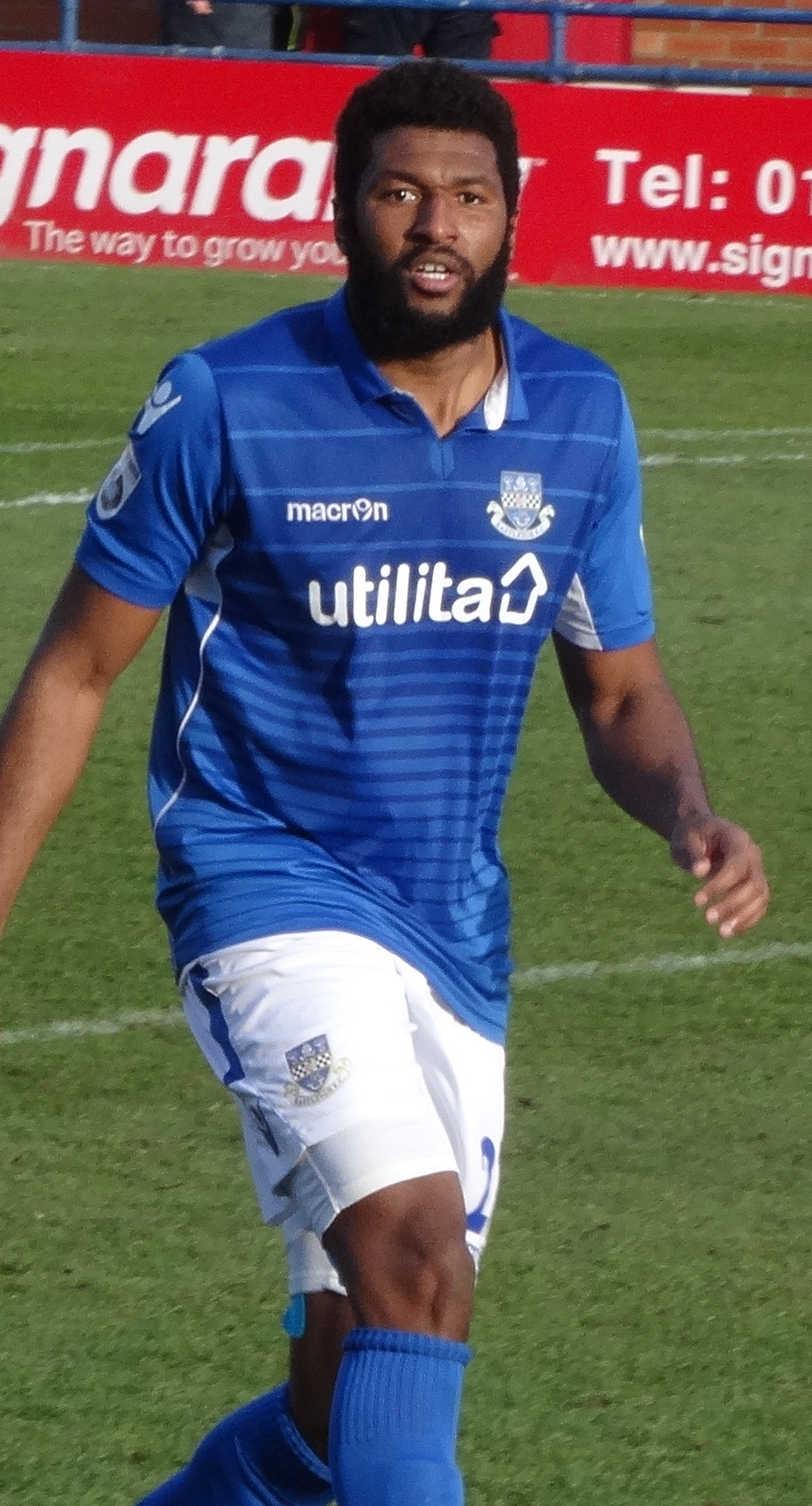
- Johnson playing for Eastleigh in 2017

Personal information
- Full name: Réda Johnson
- Date of birth: 21 March 1988 (age 38)
- Place of birth: Marseille, France
- Height: 1.91 m (6 ft 3 in)
- Position: Defender

Team information
- Current team: Cardiff City (First team coach)

Senior career*
Years	Team	Apps	(Gls)
2005–2007	Gueugnon	0	(0)
2007–2009	Amiens	15	(0)
2009–2011	Plymouth Argyle	42	(2)
2011–2014	Sheffield Wednesday	75	(18)
2014–2016	Coventry City	32	(7)
2016–2020	Eastleigh	77	(8)
2021–2022	Dover Athletic	4	(0)
Total		237	(35)

International career^{‡}
2009–2014	Benin	12	(0)
- * Club domestic league appearances and goals as of 20:17, 25 May 2022 (UTC) ‡ National team caps and goals as of 5 March 2017

Réda Johnson (born 21 March 1988) is a former professional footballer who played as a defender. He is currently first team coach at Cardiff City.

He most notably played for Sheffield Wednesday, Gueugnon, Amiens, Plymouth Argyle and Coventry City. Born in France, he played for the Benin national team.

== Club career ==
Born in Marseille, Johnson began his career as a professional footballer in 2005 with Gueugnon. He spent two years with the club but didn't make an appearance in Ligue 2 before joining Amiens. He made his debut on 24 August 2007 and went on to make a further eleven appearances in all competitions during the 2007–08 season. He was restricted to eight league appearances the following season as Amiens were relegated to Championnat National. New manager Serge Romano identified Johnson as one of the club's more saleable assets and agreed that he could leave if a suitable offer materialised. He joined Scottish club Aberdeen on trial in July 2009, and looked set to join them permanently after impressing their manager Mark McGhee.

He then played in a pre-season game for English club Plymouth Argyle, and joined permanently for an undisclosed fee on a three-year contract a few days later. He made his debut on 22 August 2009, and made a further 24 appearances in his first season with the club. He won earned many plaudits for his performances but couldn't prevent Argyle from being relegated. He scored his first senior goal in September 2010 against Colchester United, while captaining the team in the absence of Carl Fletcher. Johnson was sold to Sheffield Wednesday in January 2011 for an undisclosed fee. He scored on his league debut to rescue a point for his new club against Charlton Athletic.

It was announced on 5 July 2014 that Johnson had signed for Coventry City on a one-year contract, with a negotiation clause for a further year. He scored twice on his debut for Coventry, in a 3–2 defeat to Bradford City.

On 5 February 2020, Eastleigh Football Club released a statement that the contract with Reda had been terminated with immediate effect.

On 24 June 2021, Johnson was announced to have joined Dover Athletic in the role of player-coach. Johnson was released by the club after one season following relegation.

== International career ==
On 11 February 2009, Johnson made his debut for Benin in a friendly against Algeria.

== Coaching career ==
In late-2023, Johnson joined Cardiff City as a coach on placement, taking the club's under-15 side to victory in the regional floodlit cup final.

== Personal life ==
He went on to win the PFA Player in the Community award in 2014.

== Career statistics ==
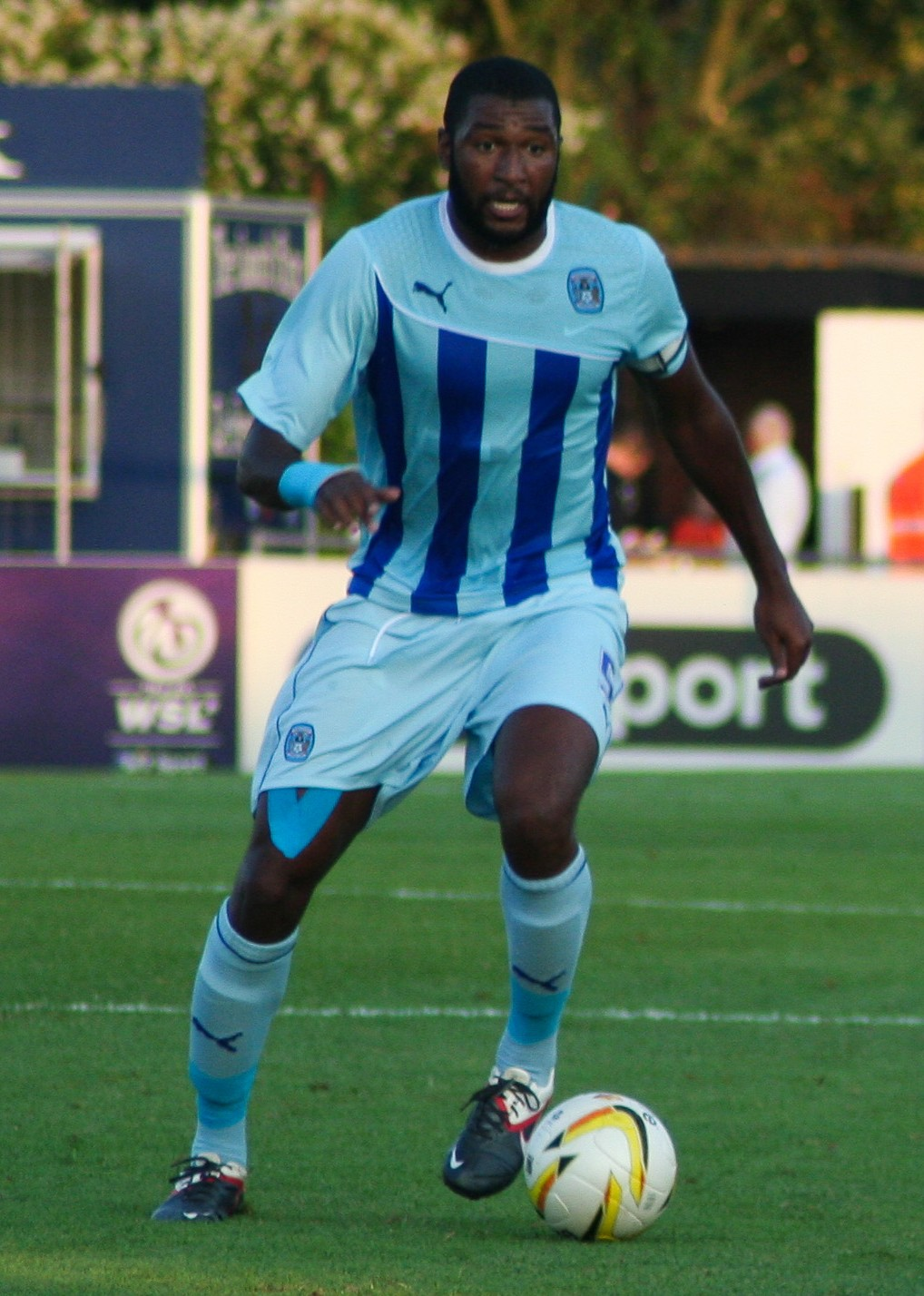
Johnson with Coventry City in 2014

As of 13 November 2021

Appearances and goals by club, season and competition
Club	Season	League			National Cup		League Cup		Other		Total	
Club	Season	Division	Apps	Goals	Apps	Goals	Apps	Goals	Apps	Goals	Apps	Goals
Amiens	2008–09	Ligue 2	7	0	1	0	0	0	—		8	0
Plymouth Argyle	2009–10	Championship	25	0	0	0	0	0	—		25	0
Plymouth Argyle	2010–11	League One	17	2	0	0	1	0	1 (Note: Appearances in Football League Trophy)	0	19	2
Plymouth Argyle	Total		42	2	0	0	1	0	1	0	44	2
Sheffield Wednesday	2010–11	League One	16	3	3	0	—		—		19	3
Sheffield Wednesday	2011–12	League One	24	7	4	0	2	0	0	0	30	7
Sheffield Wednesday	2012–13	Championship	16	6	0	0	1	0	—		17	6
Sheffield Wednesday	2013–14	Championship	19	2	2	1	0	0	—		21	3
Sheffield Wednesday	Total		75	18	9	1	3	0	0	0	87	19
Coventry City	2014–15	League One	20	5	1	1	0	0	1	0	22	6
Coventry City	2015–16	League One	12	2	0	0	0	0	0	0	12	2
Coventry City	Total		32	7	1	1	0	0	1	0	34	8
Eastleigh	2016–17	National League	21	3	5	0	—		0	0	26	3
Eastleigh	2017–18	National League	13	1	0	0	—		0	0	13	1
Eastleigh	2018–19	National League	33	2	0	0	—		2 (Note: 2 appearances in National League play-offs)	0	35	2
Eastleigh	2019–20	National League	10	2	2	1	—		1 (Note: Appearance(s) in FA Trophy)	0	13	3
Eastleigh	Total		77	8	7	1	—		3	0	87	9
Dover Athletic	2021–22	National League	4	0	1	0	—		0	0	5	0
Career total			236	35	19	3	4	0	5	0	265	38

== Honours ==
Sheffield Wednesday

- Football League One runner-up: 2011–12
