= Lewis Buxton =

English footballer

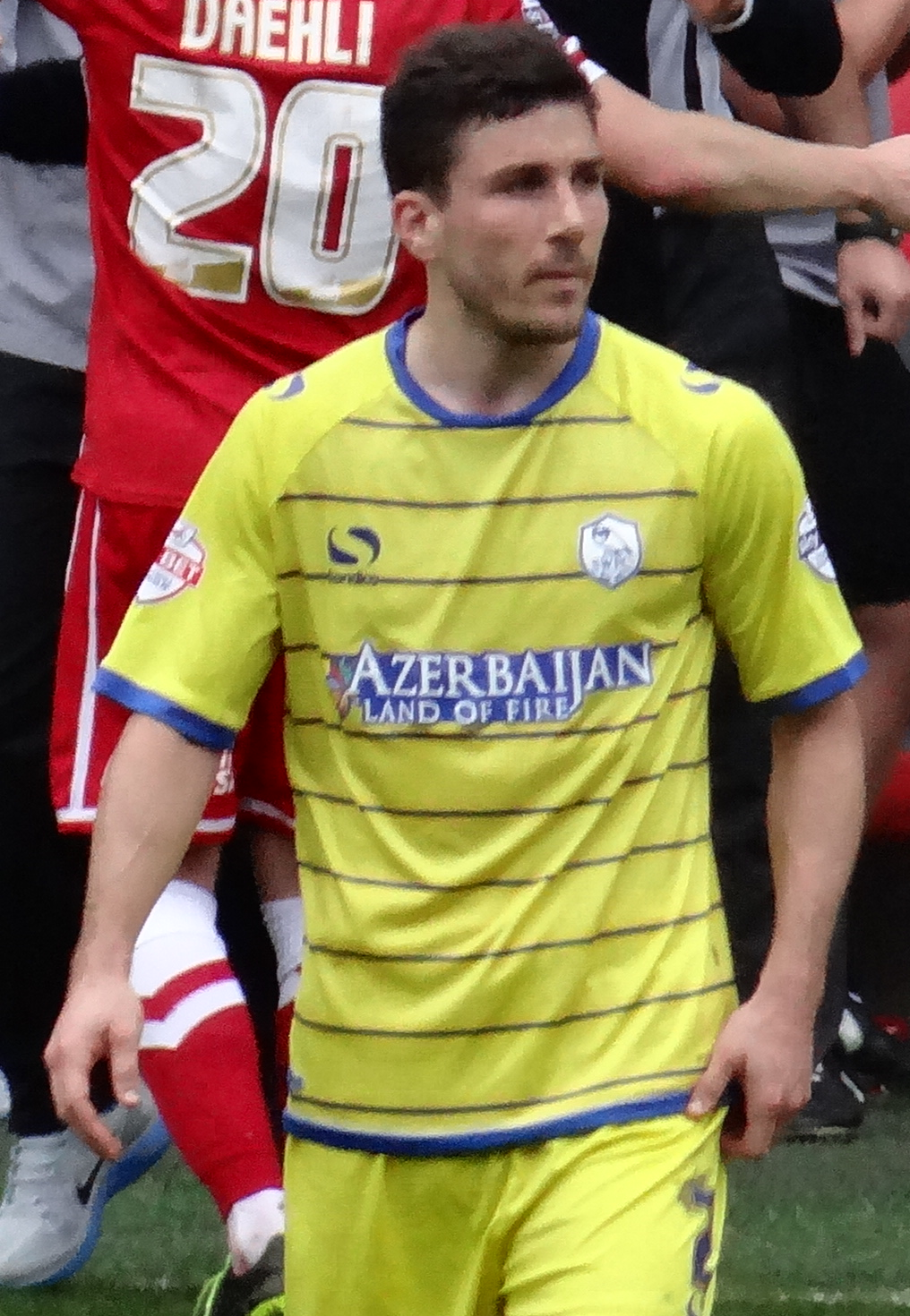
- Buxton playing for Sheffield Wednesday in 2014

Personal information
- Full name: Lewis Edward Buxton
- Date of birth: 10 December 1983 (age 42)
- Place of birth: Newport, Isle of Wight, England
- Height: 6 ft 1 in (1.85 m)
- Position: Defender

Youth career
- –2001: Portsmouth

Senior career*
Years	Team	Apps	(Gls)
2001–2004	Portsmouth	30	(0)
2002	→ Exeter City (loan)	4	(0)
2003	→ AFC Bournemouth (loan)	17	(0)
2003–2004	→ AFC Bournemouth (loan)	26	(0)
2004–2009	Stoke City	53	(1)
2008–2009	→ Sheffield Wednesday (loan)	15	(0)
2009–2015	Sheffield Wednesday	181	(6)
2015–2016	Rotherham United	20	(0)
2016–2017	Bolton Wanderers	9	(0)
Total		355	(7)
- * Club domestic league appearances and goals

Lewis Edward Buxton (born 10 December 1983) is an English former professional footballer who played as a defender.

Buxton began his career with Portsmouth where he progressed through the youth ranks at the club. He gained first team experience with loan spells at Exeter City and AFC Bournemouth. He joined Stoke City in January 2005 in order to find first team football. His time at the Britannia Stadium was hampered by injury and he left for Sheffield Wednesday in October 2008. With the Owls, Buxton established himself as a regular member of the team and spent seven years, making 207 appearances.

== Career ==
=== Portsmouth ===
A promising young defender, after working his way up through the Portsmouth youth ranks, Buxton made his first team debut at the beginning of the 2001–02 season, aged 17, in a 1–0 win at Stockport County. He was soon a regular in Graham Rix's squad.

However, following Harry Redknapp's appointment as manager at the club, and the subsequent influx of new players, Buxton found games harder to come by. He was loaned out to Exeter City for October 2002, but upon his return to Fratton Park still found the competition too great. In January he was loaned to AFC Bournemouth for the remainder of the season. He played 18 games whilst at Bournemouth, and helped them achieve promotion.

He returned to Portsmouth for the 2003–04 season, but by October he was again not in the first team picture, and so returned to Bournemouth for the season, this time playing 28 games for the Cherries. It was a similar story during the 2004–05 season when Buxton failed to break into the team on a regular basis.

=== Stoke City ===
After turning down several loan offers he decided to call time on his Portsmouth career and transferred to Football League Championship club Stoke City in January 2005. He scored his first senior goal in Stoke's 3–1 defeat to Wolverhampton Wanderers in September 2005.

He was sidelined for the first 2 months of the season due to a back injury, but he made his first start of the season in Stoke City's 1–0 win at Ipswich Town as a centre-half. However, he required an operation on his back, which kept him out for the remainder of the 2006–07 season. He since recovered and was ready for pre-season training, prior to the start of the 2007–08 season. He made his comeback as a substitute for Stephen Wright in the 33rd minute of Stoke's 2–1 win over Charlton Athletic on 18 August 2007. Buxton only appeared fleetingly in the 2007–08 season.

=== Sheffield Wednesday ===
On 17 October 2008 Buxton moved to Sheffield Wednesday on an initial one-month loan deal. This was made a full deal on 26 January 2009 after Buxton expressed his desire to leave Stoke and move to Wednesday. He signed a 2 1/2-year contract. On 31 January 2009, Buxton scored his first goal for Wednesday against Birmingham City. He has played in many different positions at Hillsborough. These are Right Back, Left Back, Centre Back, Right Wing and Centre Midfield. He achieved promotion to the Championship with Wednesday in May 2012.

In 2012–13, Buxton was voted player of the year by the Sheffield Wednesday supporters. This was following a consistency across over 40 games in a regularly changed Wednesday defensive unit. Buxton was released by Wednesday at the end of the 2014–15 season.

=== Rotherham United ===
In June 2015 Buxton signed for Rotherham United on a one-year contract with the option of a further year. After Rotherham had succeeded in surviving from relegation in the Championship, finishing one place above the drop in 21st, the club decided to opt in not keeping Buxton for a further season, and instead let his contract run out, releasing him.

=== Bolton Wanderers ===
On 5 August 2016, following a successful trial with Charlton Athletic, Buxton turned down a one-year contract signing in favour of a one-year contract to join Bolton Wanderers. On 11 May 2017 the club confirmed that Buxton would be leaving at the end of his contract on 30 June. Buxton retired from playing football after leaving the Trotters.

== Post-retirement ==
After retiring Buxton co-founded Human Experience Coaching, working with players in the Premier League, Championship, and Major League Soccer and also wrote a book named The Athlete's Bible.

== Career statistics ==
Appearances and goals by club, season and competition
Club	Season	League			FA Cup		League Cup		Other^{[A]}		Total	
Club	Season	Division	Apps	Goals	Apps	Goals	Apps	Goals	Apps	Goals	Apps	Goals
Portsmouth	2001–02	First Division	29	0	0	0	0	0	—		29	0
Portsmouth	2002–03	First Division	1	0	0	0	0	0	—		1	0
Portsmouth	2003–04	Premier League	0	0	0	0	0	0	—		0	0
Portsmouth	Total		30	0	0	0	0	0	0	0	30	0
Exeter City (loan)	2002–03	Third Division	4	0	0	0	0	0	2	0	6	0
AFC Bournemouth (loan)	2002–03	Third Division	17	0	1	0	0	0	0	0	18	0
AFC Bournemouth (loan)	2003–04	Second Division	26	0	2	0	0	0	0	0	28	0
AFC Bournemouth (loan)	Total		43	0	3	0	0	0	0	0	46	0
Stoke City	2004–05	Championship	16	0	1	0	0	0	—		17	0
Stoke City	2005–06	Championship	32	1	3	0	1	0	—		36	1
Stoke City	2006–07	Championship	1	0	0	0	0	0	—		1	0
Stoke City	2007–08	Championship	4	0	0	0	0	0	—		4	0
Stoke City	2008–09	Premier League	0	0	0	0	2	0	—		2	0
Stoke City	Total		53	1	4	0	3	0	0	0	60	1
Sheffield Wednesday	2008–09	Championship	32	1	1	0	0	0	—		33	1
Sheffield Wednesday	2009–10	Championship	28	0	1	0	0	0	—		29	0
Sheffield Wednesday	2010–11	League One	30	1	0	0	0	0	2	0	32	1
Sheffield Wednesday	2011–12	League One	37	1	2	0	0	0	0	0	39	1
Sheffield Wednesday	2012–13	Championship	40	0	2	0	2	0	—		44	0
Sheffield Wednesday	2013–14	Championship	20	3	0	0	0	0	—		20	3
Sheffield Wednesday	2014–15	Championship	9	0	0	0	1	0	—		10	0
Sheffield Wednesday	Total		196	6	6	0	3	0	2	0	207	6
Rotherham United	2015–16	Championship	20	0	0	0	2	0	—		22	0
Bolton Wanderers	2016–17	League One	9	0	0	0	0	0	2	0	11	0
Career Total			355	7	13	0	8	0	6	0	382	7

A. The "Other" column constitutes appearances and goals in the Football League play-offs and Football League Trophy.

== Honours ==
Bournemouth

- Football League Two runner-up: 2002–03

Stoke City

- EFL Championship runner-up: 2007–08

Sheffield Wednesday

- Football League One runner-up: 2011–12
- Player of the Year 2012–13

Bolton Wanderers

- EFL League One runner-up: 2016–17
