= Matthew Tumilty =

English footballer

Personal information
- Date of birth: 9 November 1993 (age 32)
- Place of birth: Newcastle upon Tyne, England
- Position: Right back

Team information
- Current team: Team Northumbria

Senior career*
Years	Team	Apps	(Gls)
2010–2012	Sheffield Wednesday	2	(0)
2012–2013	Morpeth Town	35	(3)
2013–2014	Team Northumbria	16	(1)
2025-	STB FC	8	(6)
- * Club domestic league appearances and goals

Matthew Tumilty (born 9 November 1993) is an English footballer who plays full back for Team Northumbria of the Northern League.

== Career ==
Tumilty joined Sheffield Wednesday after a successful trial in 2010. He made his professional debut on 11 August 2011, in the Football League Cup 0–0 draw with Blackpool at Hillsborough, which the Owls eventually won on penalties. He came on as a second-half substitute for Danny Uchechi. He was shown a yellow card on his debut for a late timed tackle. He was then released by the club in 2012.

Tumilty went on to play for a number or Northern League clubs fininding his greatest success at Blyth AFC under the tutelage of Ian Skinner. Tumilty currently Plys his trade for Hebburn Town Fc who he has recently signed for. Tumilty has since left and is now commanding the back line at Burradon New Fordley.
