= Cecil Nyoni =

Zimbabwean footballer (born 1992)

Personal information
- Full name: Cecil Nyoni
- Date of birth: 1 September 1993 (age 33)
- Place of birth: Bulawayo, Zimbabwe
- Positions: Midfielder; centre back

Team information
- Current team: Thorne Colliery

Youth career
- 2008–2010: Sheffield Wednesday

Senior career*
Years	Team	Apps	(Gls)
2010–2012	Sheffield Wednesday	0	(0)
2011	→ Boston United (loan)	3	(0)
2012	→ Frickley Athletic (loan)	6	(0)
2013	Nottingham Forest	0	(0)
2013	→ Worksop Town	9	(0)
2013	Matlock Town	2	(0)
2014	Stocksbridge Park Steels	4	(0)
2014–2015	Goole	17	(0)
2015–2016	Harrogate Town	15	(0)
2016–2017	Alfreton Town	10	(0)
2017	Gainsborough Trinity	1	(0)
2017	Alfreton Town		
2017	Halesowen Town		
2017	Shaw Lane		
2017–2018	Sheffield		
2018	Swallownest		
2018	Worksop Town	1	(0)
2019–	Thorne Colliery		
- * Club domestic league appearances and goals as of 20:20, 8 August 2013 (UTC)

Cecil Nyoni (born 1 September 1992) is a Zimbabwean footballer who plays for Thorne Colliery.

== Career ==
Nyoni was born in Bulawayo but he grew up in Gwanda, and he moved to England in 2003 aged 11. Nyoni joined Wednesday just before his 16th birthday after being spotted playing for local side Middlewood Rovers. He previously played for Brinsworth, and also had the choice to join Sheffield rivals Sheffield United.

=== Sheffield Wednesday ===
He made his professional debut on 11 August 2011, in the Football League Cup 0–0 draw with Blackpool at Hillsborough Stadium, which the Owls eventually won on penalties. His second appearance for the club was in the same month against Bradford City, this time in the Football League Trophy. This time he made his appearance from the bench after seventeen minutes, replacing Jose Semedo. The game was away at Valley Parade and it was another goalless draw and this time Wednesday lost 3–1 on penalties.

=== Boston United (loan) ===
On 8 January 2011, he was sent out on work experience to Conference North side Boston United after an injury crisis at York Street. He made his debut for the Pilgrims in a 1–0 victory over Gloucester City and went onto make a total of three appearances.

=== Frickley Athletic (loan) ===
On 23 March 2012, Nyoni signed for Frickley Athletic on loan for the rest of the season from Sheffield Wednesday. Nyoni's first game for Frickley Athletic was a 1–0 loss, at home to Marine. His second appearance for the non-league club was the goalless draw away to Nantwich Town. After five straight appearances for the club – all starting the game – Nyoni made his last league appearance on the last day of the season where he had to help Frickley win, along with results elsewhere going for the club, otherwise they would have faced relegation. Frickely stayed up by winning the game 4–3 against Stafford Rangers. His last appearance for the club was in the Sheffield and Hallamshire Senior Cup final against Worksop Town. Frickley had the potential to win the competition for the twelfth time, and with scores level at 1–1 after forty minutes, Nyoni scored his first goal for the club, and in his whole football career, after making eight appearances between three different clubs. However, Worksop Town came from behind to win the game 3–2, and won the competition for the twelfth time.

=== Nottingham Forest ===
Nyoni joined Nottingham Forest during the 2012–13 season, and made an appearance for the Under-21 side against Sheffield United. He came off the bench in the seventy-fifth minute. Later on that same month Nyoni joined Worksop Town on loan for the rest of the season. He made his debut for Worksop Town in a 0–2 loss against Nantwich Town, and went on to make nine appearances for the rest of the season for the club.

=== Non-League ===
Nyoni joined League of Ireland side Limerick on 6 August 2013. However, he was denied clearance as Limerick were unable to process his registration. Instead he joined Matlock Town in November 2013 and Stocksbridge Park Steels in September 2014. Just weeks later he moved to Goole, before Harrogate Town boss Simon Weaver brought him from East to North Yorkshire in December 2014. The contract with Town was cancelled on 4 January 2016. During the same month he joined Alfreton Town of National League North on non-contract terms. He then switched to league rivals Gainsborough Trinity in March 2017 until the end of the season, and committed to the club ahead of the 2017–18 season. However, he returned to Alfreton Town in July 2017. The spell was short-lived, as he moved to Halesowen Town in time for the autumn. Further moves include Shaw Lane in October 2017, Sheffield in November 2017, Swallownest in March 2018, and Worksop Town again in July 2018. His only league appearance for the latter was against Eccleshill United on 18 August 2018.

In March 2019 he joined Thorne Colliery of the Central Midlands League North Division.
