= 2013–14 Sheffield Wednesday F.C. season =

English football club season

Sheffield Wednesday
2013–14 season
- Chairman: Milan Mandarić
- Manager: Dave Jones (until 1 December 2013); Stuart Gray (from 1 December 2013)
- Stadium: Hillsborough Stadium
- Championship: 16th
- FA Cup: Round 5 (eliminated by Charlton Athletic)
- League Cup: Round 1 (eliminated by Rotherham United)
- Top goalscorer: League: Chris Maguire (9); All: Chris Maguire (10)
- Highest home attendance: 25,279 (vs. Wigan Athletic)
- Lowest home attendance: 18,029 (vs. Queens Park Rangers)
- Average home league attendance: 21,239
Home colours	Away colours

During the 2013–14 football season, Sheffield Wednesday Football Club competed in three professional football competitions. Sheffield Wednesday competed in the 2013–14 Football League Championship, 2013–14 FA Cup, and the 2013–14 Football League Cup. It was the Owls' second consecutive season in the Football League Championship having secured promotion from League One in the 2011–12 season and then securing Championship safety on the last day of the 2012–13 season. The Football League season kicked off in the beginning of August, along with the League Cup in the same month. Meanwhile, with Sheffield Wednesday being within the top two-tiers of the English football league system the club did not enter the FA Cup until the beginning of January 2014 where they entered Round 3 of the competition.

== Review ==
=== Pre-season ===
Following the end of the 2012–13 football league season, Jérémy Hélan, Danny Pugh, Seyi Olofinjana, Leroy Lita and Steve Howard all returned to their parent clubs following their loans at Sheffield Wednesday. Many players were out of contract in the summer of 2013 and therefore many decisions had to be made on players' futures at the club within May and June. The first transfer of the new pre-season was confirmed just a few days after the end of the 2012–13 football season as development squad player Bastien Héry signed for Rochdale. Sheffield Wednesday youth players Ayo Obileye, Emmanuel Dieseruvwe and Johnny Fenwick soon all signed their first professional contracts with the club, all lasting one-year. On 16 May 2013, the club announced their retained list, with Player of the Year Lewis Buxton, Stephen Bywater, Giles Coke, Jermaine Johnson, Miguel Llera and David Prutton being the senior players to re-sign, while Adam Hinchliffe and Hayden White (who was rumoured to be signing for Bolton Wanderers) were offered their first professional contract. Nicky Weaver and Julian Bennett were released along with youth players Matthew Fletcher and Harry Grant. Also, out-of-favour midfielder Nejc Pečnik left by mutual consent. On 19 June 2013, the first transfer in relation to Sheffield Wednesday was revealed, with Chris O'Grady joining Yorkshire rivals Barnsley for an undisclosed fee, rumoured to be around £300,000. The week after the O'Grady departure, two players had decided whether their futures still lay with Sheffield Wednesday. Promising youth player Hayden White rejected an offer to sign with the team and went with Bolton Wanderers. White had been heavily followed the previous season with his impressive performances for the Owls' youth team and was linked with a possible move to Manchester United at one point. Elsewhere, senior player Stephen Bywater had also rejected signing and went with Millwall on a free transfer for a two-year contract. Bywater played a major part in the side's promotion in the 2011–12 season where he was signed permanently in January of that season. A day after these departures it was confirmed that David Prutton had signed to stay for the next season. Prutton is the second senior player to re-sign after Lewis Buxton signed later that month. 24-hours after Prutton's contract confirmation, Sheffield Wednesday's first signing of the season was confirmed. The signing was Jacques Maghoma from Burton Albion. He has signed a two-year contract after scoring 18 goals in League Two last season from the wing. Another player committed his future at Sheffield Wednesday on 27 June when Miguel Llera signed a new one-year contract at the club, having been a key player in defence over the last two-seasons. Another senior player yet to confirm where his future lay was Giles Coke, but he also chose to commit his future to Wednesday by signing a two-year contract at the club a day after Llera had signed his. Into July and nearly a week after Coke signed with the team, Jermaine Johnson was the last remaining senior player to be offered a contract that he signed to stay for the following season. He is one of the longest playing team players having made over 200 appearances having since joined the club in 2007 Later that day, it was confirmed that the club's midfielder Chris Lines had left by mutual consent. Lines was signed in the summer of 2011 and in the 2011–12 season he made the majority of his 53 appearances and scored all of his 4 goals.

Sheffield Wednesday's first pre-season fixtures were announced on 15 May; the club confirmed that the first pre-season game would be away to Scunthorpe United on 13 July and then the side would, like the previous season, play two pre-season fixtures in Portugal, this time against Hull City in the second game in Portugal on 20 July, while the first game in the country was later confirmed to be Sporting Braga on 16 June 2013. A day later Chesterfield were confirmed to be friendly opponents on 27 July at their ground. Scottish giants Rangers was confirmed at the end of May to be the only pre-season friendly that will be at home, with the game due to take place mid-week on 24 July. The Owls played in their first pre-season friendly on 6 July 2013 with a "behind-closed-doors" friendly. The game was hosted at St George's Park National Football Centre, where the team played Romanian first-tier champions Steaua București. It ended in a 1–1 draw with goals either side of the half with Miguel Llera scoring for Wednesday in the second-half. Tuesday, 9 July saw Sheffield Wednesday play in a friendly-testimonial game against Stockport County. The game was a testimonial for Rodger Wylde, whose first club was Sheffield Wednesday and his last Stockport County, between his career spanning 1972–1989. Wednesday took the lead within 43 seconds when Michail Antonio scored for the Owls, Martin Taylor scored after 12-minutes and the game was wrapped up when Chris Maguire scored a penalty at the stroke of half-time. There were no further goals in the game but ex-Wednesday players Chris Waddle and David Hirst made appearances in the last 15 minutes of the game for the Owls. Three days after this game, one of last season's loanees signed on a permanent-basis: Jérémy Hélan signed on a four-year contract, making it the longest current contract at the club. The weekend after Hélan's signing, Sheffield Wednesday faced Scunthorpe United away in a friendly. It was a first-half strike by new signing Hélan that gave the Owls a 1–0 victory in this pre-season friendly. Similarly to last season's pre-season Sheffield Wednesday flew to a training camp in Portugal, where they would play two games in just under a week. The first game was against top Portuguese side Sporting Braga, whom although were trailing by one goal thanks to a Martin Taylor's header after nineteen minutes, scored twice in the last five-minutes of the first half and then also scored in the second to win the game 3–1. Although it was Sheffield Wednesday's first loss of their pre-season it was still seen as a good workout. Wednesday's second and last game in Portugal was against newly promoted Hull City, the game was fairly even and the Owls's best chance fell after great work by Michail Antonio in the middle of the park led to a pass threading through to Jérémy Hélan, who rounded the goalkeeper and had his shot cleared off the line. Meanwhile, Hull's best chance was when they scored, though the goal was disallowed for offside. Another pre-season workout was completed, but this time finished in a goalless draw. Sheffield Wednesday returned from their trip to Portugal in the week commencing 22 July, where they prepared for their final two pre-season friendlies against Rangers and Chesterfield. The Rangers game was the only home friendly of pre-season for the Owls and Rangers brought 6,000 fans to the game, selling out the away stand at Hillsborough Stadium, just for a friendly match. Although the away support was as if the game was a competitive fixture, the match was still played like a friendly. Both sides were fairly evenly matched and when Wednesday got a corner on 12-minutes Michail Antonio's shot bounced off the ground a looped into the goal to give Sheffield Wednesday the lead. And that was the only goal of the game, giving Sheffield Wednesday their third win of pre-season. Under 24-hours after the Rangers game and Sheffield Wednesday signed their third player of the new season, European striker Atdhe Nuhiu. Nuhiu has played in the top-league of Austria for the most of his career and signed on a three-year contract on a free transfer from Rapid Wien. Two-days later and Nuhiu played in Sheffield Wednesday's final pre-season fixture, this being away to Chesterfield. Although the Owls dominated the first half, it was Chesterfield who were leading at half-time thanks to a goal from Hamza Bencherif on 29 minutes. Wednesday deservedly equalised though late in the second-half with just two-minutes of normal time as Chris Maguire scored from 20-yards. Sheffield Wednesday's pre-season was over after seven pre-season friendlies in preparation for the upcoming season, with the first game a week away against Queens Park Rangers.

=== August ===
On the day before the first game of the season, Sheffield Wednesday signed central defender Kamil Zayatte, who had been on trial with the Owls throughout pre-season, on a free transfer on a two-year-long contract. Later on that same day and Wednesday winger Danny Mayor went out on loan to League Two side Bury for the entire season. Sheffield Wednesday opened their championship campaign on Saturday 3 August away to promotion favourites Queens Park Rangers. Manager Dave Jones gave débuts to new signings Kamil Zayatte and Atdhe Nuhiu, who both had just managed to gain international clearance before the game. The game kicked off at Loftus Road in front of a full house and Rangers were soon on the upper hand with Andrew Johnson having an effort from distance just go wide and volley well saved as well. Once the game settled down, Wednesday got their fair share of chances with Atdhe Nuhiu's volley and shot inside the box being saved and going wide respectively. Then on nineteen-minutes Nuhiu wiggled his way out of two defenders' challenges cut inside and hit a shot that sailed into the bottom corner, giving the Owls the lead and a début goal for the 6-foot 6-inch striker Atdhe Nuhiu. Although the game continued to be evenly matched, Rangers were the ones who were creating the chances. Junior Hoilett got his shot over the bar from close range and then Bobby Zamora was denied by a save from Chris Kirkland. Soon after, a long ball by David Prutton over the top sent Michail Antonio through on goal, who was clipped from behind by the opposing defender in the box, but the referee waved away the penalty claims. If a penalty had been given, it would surely have been a red card as well as the opposing defender was the last man. Two minutes later when QPR gained a corner and took it quickly, Sheffield Wednesday were asleep and not aware of the danger, Junior Hoilett cut inside, took a shot that was going wide until the ball was passed into the net by Nedum Onuoha to put the game level. After the goal Queens Park Rangers had the momentum and the Owls were just looking to hang on for five minutes until half-time. However, three minutes later a Joey Barton header was saved by Kirkland and the rebound was volleyed in by Andrew Johnson, and the Owls were behind. Dave Jones was very frustrated at half-time, and in the second half, Hoilett continued to run riot and had another opportunity excellently saved by Chris Kirkland. Soon after, Jermaine Johnson and Michail Antonio found themselves two-on-one when the Owls pounced on the counter-attack, and when the ball was slid to Antonio with the goal gaping at his mercy he hit the ball over the bar. Then substitute Jacques Maghoma (also making his début) was taken down in the box by Joey Barton (who had just been booked), the referee stopped play but only to book Maghoma for diving. Replays revealed that the penalty should have been given with Barton being sent off in a result of this. Then to add to Maghoma and Wednesday's woes, he went on to hit the post. The first game of the season ended in a 2–1 loss against the promotion favourites.

With hours to go before the League Cup, Round 1 fixture against local rivals Rotherham United kicked off, it was confirmed that Portuguese left-back Rafael Floro had signed for the club having spent all pre-season impressing while playing for the Owls. Floro did make his debut for the club and first career appearance hours later as he was one of three changes for the League Cup clash. The game was delayed by 15 minutes due to crowd congestion, but when the game did kick-off it was all Rotherham United who were taking the game to the Owls. And when a long throw-in was launched into the box, it bounced all the way to the other side of the box where Rotherham midfielder Ben Pringle volleyed into the far top corner of the net. Rotherham United continued to be the better side but soon after when Wednesday got a free-kick 35 yards out, Rhys McCabe stepped up, and with the help of a small deflection, hit the ball into the far corner of the net to put the game level again. Although the game did even out slightly after this, it was still Rotherham United who played as the better side and when another long thrown-in was cleared just to the outside of the box, it was Lee Frecklington who managed to find some space and strike the ball from distance into the net and Rotherham were in front again. Into the second half and chances were few and far, but the main talking point was when Wednesday substitute Jermaine Johnson lost his cool and head-butted an opposition player in an off-the-ball incident. The officials were aware of this and Jermaine Johnson got a straight red-card, earning himself a three-match suspension on top of the already many injuries to the side. That was the last main piece of action and it was Rotherham United who went through to the next round, while earning themselves 'bragging rights' with Sheffield Wednesday losing and falling at the first hurdle of the competition. The weekend following the League Cup defeat and Sheffield Wednesday faced Burnley in the first home game of the season. Further injuries had hit the squad by the game, stretching the squad to its limit. The first opportunity of the game was when a shot was deflected into a cross and went into Sam Vokes's path, but he was unable to convert due to a good Chris Kirkland save. As Wednesday got into the game it was them who had more of the chances, with Jérémy Hélan's shot from distance just going wide and Jacques Maghoma's accurate free-kick being well-saved by the opposition goalkeeper. Also another chance was when Michail Antonio's cross fell to David Prutton whose shot hit the side netting. Maghoma's clever cross was nearly deflected to an own goal, but when Burnley broke on the Owls, a cross was failed to be closed down by new-boy and youngster Rafael Floro and unfortunately the cross fell to Danny Ings who headed home comfortably to give Burnley the lead. Then just five-minutes later near enough exactly the same thing happened: Floro failed to close down the cross and Sam Vokes headed pass the keeper to put Burnley two in front. Wednesday had been the better side in the first-half but poor defending had led to them being 2–0 down. Sheffield Wednesday came out fighting in the second half and Atdhe Nuhiu's header seemed destined for the far top-corner but span just wide. Nuhiu then had another head well saved and the follow-up by Antonio was also blocked. With around 20-minutes to go and the Owls got what they deserved, a goal. Liam Palmer's first time cross met the head of Prutton to pull a goal back for Wednesday. Youngster Caolan Lavery came off the bench for his début for the club, but was unable to help his side equalise and Sheffield Wednesday fell to another frustrating 2–1 loss.

The next game in Wednesday's fixture list was against local rivals Leeds United, just three weeks in to the new season. The game saw comebacks from first-team full-backs Lewis Buxton and Réda Johnson (who eventually came off the bench in the second-half). At 12:15, the game kicked off and it started fairly evenly and the first chance of the game came for Sheffield Wednesday. When a corner was curled into the box Atdhe Nuhiu's header was stopped just on the line by the keeper. However, Leeds almost capitalised when Jérémy Hélan lost the ball just outside his own area, but David Prutton came sliding in to stop a Leeds player from striking the ball in a very good position. With just under ten-minutes to go until half-time and the Owls won another corner, this was whipped in to the far post by Hélan, where Michail Antonio headed the ball across goal to see Kamil Zayatte loop a header into the net, scoring his first goal for the club and giving the Owls the lead. Sheffield Wednesday continued to trouble Leeds from corner's but the home team managed to hang on until half-time. Into the second half and Leeds United came out looking for an equaliser and on the 58th-minute Ross McCormack picked up the ball just passed the half-way line in the Owls' half, ran at the defence, fooled Zayatte as he ran round him with the ball going the other way and slotted the ball past the on-rushing Chris Kirkland. A great goal saw the game level at 1–1 again (similarly to the last two encounters, although Leeds went on to win the last 2–1). The game continued to be a tight and scrappy Yorkshire derby, but Antonio's solo effort and shot nearly gave Wednesday the lead if it wasn't for a good save by the opposition goalkeeper and ex-Sheffield United player Paddy Kenny. Sheffield Wednesday continued to create the better chances though and a long throw-in by Antonio was flicked on by Zayatte where Jacques Maghoma swivelled and took the shot on which was blocked by two Leeds players (one of which blocked partially with an arm but was too close to the ball for a penalty to be given) and bounced in front of goal line where several players launched themselves in to get a foot on the ball, but it was a Leeds United players' foot that got the ball away. That was the last main piece of action of the game and it ended all square at Elland Road, giving Sheffield Wednesday their first point of the season.

A day before Sheffield Wednesday's second home fixture of the season against Millwall, the Owls signed young Swiss striker Andelko Savić from Italian side Sampdoria on a season-long loan. Savić will most likely feature in the team's Development Squad for at least the first half of the season. 24-hours later and the home game against Millwall had just kicked off, with Millwall quite bizarrely having to wear Wednesday's away kit for the first-half having forgotten their own. Millwall without even a point so far this season got off to a great start just five-minutes into the game, soon after Chris Kirkland had already had to make one great stop, he failed to make another as a cross hit Owls' player Kamil Zayatte 2-yards out and bounced into the net, scoring his second goal in two games, however this one was unfortunately in his own net. Their lead didn't last long though, not even 2 minutes as a long ball from a free-kick was sent in by Lewis Buxton and was fumbled by the opposition goalkeeper, then failed to be cleared and Réda Johnson jumped highest to head home and put the scores level again. Then fifteen-minutes later good work by Atdhe Nuhiu saw Jérémy Hélan set himself up for the shot outside the area and coolly finish into the bottom corner, Wednesday were now ahead. Into the second half and Réda Johnson scored again; however it was ruled out for a foul on the opposition goalkeeper. Millwall should have equalised when a cross found the free-head of a Millwall striker whose header went wide of the goal. But with three-minutes to go a corner for Millwall was taken and the ball bounced away from the centre of the area, it was chased down by a Millwall player who went down very easily under a challenge by Hélan and this was quite extraordinarily given as a penalty by the referee. To make things worse Millwall scored the penalty and the game ended all square at 2–2, leaving Wednesday very frustrated.

With the Owls continuing to struggle at the back due to injuries, and Lewis Buxton having been sidelined yet again through injury, West Ham United defender Jordan Spence was signed on a 28-day emergency loan deal and was eligible to play for the game against Middlesbrough that very day. He made his début that very day in a game that started with Middlesbrough dominating the first ten-minutes and as Wednesday gradually got into the game it was they who was creating more chances and with ten-minutes to go until half-time a corner swung in to the box and was headed down in front of goalkeeper by Kamil Zayatte but Michail Antonio managed to swing his boot at the ball sending it into the roof of the net giving the Owls the lead. Chris Kirkland was tested on a few occasions before the break but the score remained the same. Into the second half and Middlesbrough similarly to the first-half started on top and when a Middlesbrough player beat Zayatte to the ball before he could clear it away, it left an open gap for Middlesbrough to cross and Mustapha Carayol to tap in the equaliser. Although the game went on to be relatively even, Middlesbrough nearly doubled their lead when Lukas Jutkiewicz hit the bar with his fierce first-time shot from the edge of the box. The game finished level meaning another draw for Sheffield Wednesday. During the first half of this game, Captain Anthony Gardner had to be stretchered off the pitch, looking to what could be a serious injury, leaving the Owls without another defender and mainly another key player to their team.

=== September ===
Transfer deadline day this year fell on Monday 2 September and Sheffield Wednesday were one of the most inactive teams during the day as they were not involved in any transfers what so ever. The weekend before the international break and Wednesday's worst fears of Anthony Gardner were confirmed as it was revealed that he had torn his Achilles tendon, usually meaning a player will be sidelined for around 5-months.

Dave Jones had already revealed that he planned to bring players in and take players out of the club during the emergency loan window which opened a week after the closure of the transfer window. It had already been known that Sheffield Wednesday will have to let players go out before anyone comes in due to the tight wage budget and finances at the club. Martin Taylor was the first player to go out on loan as he joined Brentford for a month. Back at Hillsborough Stadium after the international break and Sheffield Wednesday faced newly promoted Yeovil Town, with the Owls looking to gain their first win of the season. Both teams started fairly evenly and it was Yeovil who had the first key chance when they forced Kamil Zayatte into making a goal line clearance. However, as the Owls continued to push, a long ball over the top, saw the linesman put the offside flag up for Atdhe Nuhiu who seemed to be going for the ball, however the referee didn't blow his whistle as Michail Antonio picked up the ball instead as he was in an on side position, therefore the referee had over-ruled the linesman with the game continuing to go on. Yeovil momentarily paused waiting for the whistle, while Michail Antonio went through on goal and passed the ball square to Atdhe Nuhiu who passed the ball into the net. A controversial goal followed many Yeovil complaints, with the referee discussing the matter with the linesman and eventually decided to give the goal. Replays after the game showed that the referee had made the correct decision. As Yeovil felt hard done by the contest fell into a scrappy, rough affair with strong challenges going in, mainly from the Yeovil Town players. And on 41-minutes, just after Nuhiu had a header just miss the back of the net, Yeovil defender Byron Webster was caught in a rough tangle with Nuhiu which led to both players falling to the ground and Byron Webster seeming to throw a punch at Nuhiu while tussling on the ground. Byron Webster saw a straight red card for the incident and the Owls couldn't have gone in much better at half-time. Into the second half and although it was the Owls in the lead and having the extra man advantage, it was Yeovil who were the better side and somehow pushing for the equaliser. Yeovil Town's Joe Ralls gave his team what they deserved with 25-minutes to go when he took a great first-touch outside the area and finished nicely on the volley into the far corner. After this both sides gave it their all and Sheffield Wednesday now looked the more likely team to score and the fans thought they were about to do just that as a cross found Antonio who volleyed towards the goal where the opposition goalkeeper saved the shot, but also fumbled it, and as the ball rolled and hit the inside of the post, Nuhiu and Réda Johnson raced to tap the ball home but the keeper pounced upon the loose ball just in time. Sheffield Wednesday were left with another draw, this one though more disappointing than the others due to the position they were in at half-time and arguably should have gone on to win the game.

A day after the Yeovil result, Wednesday signed Roger Johnson on loan from Wolverhampton Wanderers for three months with the Owls amid their desperate need of another centre-back. Later in the week it was confirmed that ex-Cardiff City midfielder and free-agent Stephen McPhail had signed for the club until mid-January. McPhail went on to start the away game against Birmingham City two days later. The team and McPhail started the game brightly and although Michail Antonio went close, it was Birmingham's first real attack of the game that led to the first goal. Chris Burke's shot was saved well but the rebound was tapped in by Jesse Lingard, scoring on his début for Birmingham having joined them on loan from Manchester United earlier on in the week. After this goal and Birmingham had the momentum and dominated, and it wasn't long until they doubled their lead. Again it was new loan signing Lingard whom dribbled and dodged in and out of defender's in the box before slotting home his second of the afternoon. And it was only two-minutes later after this goal when it was game over. Jesse Lingard shot from outside the area found the bottom corner to complete his hat-trick. 3–0 at half-time and the main objective really for the Owls was not to concede any more. However, Birmingham continued to create chances after the break and just six-minutes into the second-half Burke and Lingard linked up with each other for Jesse Lingard to score yet another goal. Wednesday did create a few chances before the end of the game, one of which they scored, when a corner was whipped in and headed in for a late consolation goal by Kamil Zayatte. After the goal and Shane Ferguson nearly made it 5 when he went through on goal but Chris Kirkland kept the player at bay.

As the Owls prepared for the derby game against Doncaster Rovers, it was confirmed that Matty Fryatt had joined the team on loan from Hull City for 1-month. Fryatt started the following game at Hillsborough Stadium on the bench. The derby game was a tight and scrappy affair, but it was Sheffield Wednesday whom created the most chances in a very dull first-half. Atdhe Nuhiu's shot went just wide after the mistake from the Doncaster defence. Jérémy Hélan also had a tame effort from distance comfortably saved. That was all to be noted in the first-half, but the second-half continued to be a tight and scrappy affair but more chances were created. Doncaster had one half-chance from a corner, while Nuhiu's header from a cross was just cleared off the line by ex-Owl Rob Jones. Soon after and Miguel Llera also had his header cleared off the line by an excellent save from Doncaster Rovers goalkeeper Ross Turnbull. Doncaster's first main chance of the game came midway through the second half as new loan signing Federico Macheda, another loan signing by an opposing club from Manchester United, managed to take on two defenders before his finished was well-saved by Chris Kirkland at the near post. Doncaster's second main chance though was a cross where Macheda out-jumped Llera and headed the ball on-target...and into the net. Doncaster up to this point had been second-best in the game, but after the goal Wednesday did well to not concede a second. Chris Kirkland was forced into a double save after a free-kick led to two shots by the same player. Boos echoed Hillsborough as the full-time whistle blew, with the Owls still without a win this season.

=== October ===
The very first day of October landed on a Tuesday where the Owls faced Brighton & Hove Albion down at the south coast. Brighton had the first major chance of the game as a ball over the Owls' defence saw Ashley Barnes go through on goal, but keeper Kirkland made an excellent save to keep the scores level. Chris Kirkland continued to make some good saves and Brighton nearly had a penalty given as Kazenga LuaLua was brought down in the box by Lewis Buxton. However, the referee waved away the protests in which replays revealed it would have been a fairly 'soft' penalty to give. Although it was Brighton who were creating more chances it was Sheffield Wednesday who took the lead three-minutes before the break. Great work by Jérémy Hélan saw him take on two players before crossing low in the box, where loanee Matty Fryatt touched and swivelled before blasting the ball home into the back of the net. Into the second half and Ashley Barnes was so close to scoring for Brighton again, after his shot from a cross went just wide of the post. Wednesday continued to somehow keep Brighton at bay, even when Keith Andrews' volley also went just wide. Into the last-minute with the game ticking down to the Owls' first victory of the season, a cross from Brighton was then headed across goal where Keith Andrews tapped in at the far post. Wednesday had failed to hold on to their first victory of the season with the game finishing level at 1–1. Just before the following weekend started the Owls' club striker Gary Madine verdict of his trial was announced. Gary Madine is to face an 18-month jail sentence after two separate assaults in night clubs. Ipswich Town were the next team that Wednesday faced that following weekend. Sheffield Wednesday went out looking for their first win of the season and nearly took the lead early on when Atdhe Nuhiu's shot was well saved by the opposing goalkeeper. However, twelve-minutes in and a long ball over the top set Ipswich on the counter where a cross found Paul Anderson who comfortably took on the shot and scored. Two-minutes later and a cross by Wednesday this time saw Nuhiu head across goal where Michail Antonio then headed into the back of the net and the scores were all level again. The Owls continued to press for the lead at Hillsborough and Matty Fryatt's clear cut volley was unfortunately straight at the keeper, who palmed the ball over for a corner. Into the second half and Réda Johnson also came close with a header, before Kirkland saved an opposing shot well at the near post. Kirkland then had to make another save, this one excellently, as Paul Anderson nearly doubled his tally for the afternoon as his shot took a slight deflection and seemed to be heading into the near corner before it was palmed out for a corner. And then as the game entered the last quarter of its time Jermaine Johnson dribbled inwards from the left-hand side and had fierce shot from 25-yards out that seemed to be destined for the top corner of the goal, only to be denied by the bar. Another draw and another game without a win came as the full-time whistle blew soon after.

On 15 October 2013, Arsenal's young goalkeeper Emiliano Martínez joined the club on loan to give more competition to Chris Kirkland. Martínez was on the bench for Wednesday's next game against Bolton Wanderers at the Reebok Stadium and it was the Owls whom started the lot brighter, especially when Matty Fryatt came close after great link up play with Giles Coke. Two-minutes after this chance though and good link up play by two of the opposition players saw Jermaine Beckford take on a fantastically sliced shot and score against the run of play with 16-minutes gone on the clock. Just 10-minutes later and Wednesday were deservedly back on level terms as Jérémy Hélan's cross instead found the head Alex Baptiste whose diving header bounced on the ground and went into the net, therefore scoring an own goal. The game was fairly evenly matched up to half-time and the second-half started similarly as the first did with the Owls on top. Jérémy Hélan created the first goal and very nearly scored the second as he took on his man in the box and his shot was well saved by the opposing goalkeeper. Halfway through the second-half with Sheffield Wednesday still on top, they managed to win a free-kick just outside and to the right-hand corner of the box. Stephen McPhail whipped the ball in, which was punched away only to find Kamil Zayatte whose resultant header looped up and into the back of the net giving the Owls the lead. Or that's what they thought until they realised that the assistant referee had her flag up. The goal was given as offside as when Zayatte's looping header was on its way to the back of the net, Réda Johnson went for the ball from being in an offside position, he jumped and attempted to flick on the ball and even though he didn't touch the ball, the officials felt that Réda Johnson was interfering with play when being from an offside position. Into the last five-minutes with Wednesday on the front foot and looking to win the game, José Semedo went in with a strong but fair challenge on an opposing player where he won the ball. However, the referee blew his whistle and without much hesitation showed Semedo a red card. Protests to the referee by the Sheffield Wednesday players were unsuccessful and José Semedo left the field in tears. Down to ten men and the game had spun itself on its head and it was now Bolton who were looking to win the game, even though they had been second best throughout the 90-minutes. Into stoppage-time and a Bolton corner led to a header where Chris Kirkland made an excellent save to keep the scores level. Two more corners in stoppage time later and another header was directed towards goal and Kirkland made an even better save to ensure the Owls didn't leave empty handed as the referee blew his whistle with the scores locked at 1–1.

José Semedo's red card appeal the following week was unsuccessful which meant he missed the next 3 games, including the next one which was the derby day visit to Barnsley. Hours before the game and it was confirmed that free-agent Seyi Olofinjana had joined the club on a short-term contract. The midfielder had joined the club on a short loan spell at the end of last season as well where he helped the team survive from relegation. An early kick-off at Oakwell and both relegation threatened teams started well but it was the Owls' away faithful that had thought they had scored when loanee Roger Johnson's header hit the side netting. Seven-minutes later and Réda Johnson was tackled while in possession of the ball at the back, leading Barnsley to quickly counterattack. Marcus Pedersen decided to quickly shoot from outside the area and his fierce shot hit the post so hard it came back out to around 30-yards from goal where the ball was passed, in the air, straight back to Marcus Pedersen whose touch set him up for a fantastic volley inside the area that riffled into the top of the net giving Chris Kirkland no chance. Jérémy Hélan soon came close to putting the Owls back level though, as he took on a player but his shot was so close to being on target, but instead hit the side netting. Just before the break and Barnsley's Paddy McCourt managed to take on three players while dribbling with the ball from wide on the touchline to inside the box, and his final shot trickled along the front of the goal and out past the far post for a goal kick. Barnsley had been the better side in the first-half, but all changed in the second and it started first when Atdhe Nuhiu's shot was well saved by the opposition keeper. Coming up to the hour mark and the ball was cleared out from a Wednesday corner all the way to the halfway line where Jérémy Hélan touched and volleyed the ball back towards goal and all the players up field, the ball hit and span off Réda Johnson's leg and found Matty Fryatt with acres of space and the keeper on-rushing, but he volleyed home first time sweetly leading to eruption in the away end. After the goal and Sheffield Wednesday were relentless and the opposition goalkeeper somehow kept out Michail Antonio's free open shot from just three yards out. Matty Fryatt's follow-up then went over the bar. Barnsley though looked dangerous on the counter-attack and nearly scored when a cross was whipped in front of goal but the out-stretching leg of a Barnsley attacker couldn't make contact with the ball. Antonio's shot over the bar soon after this was the last piece of action in the game meaning Sheffield Wednesday had still not won all season after 12 games and had drawn all their games in 1–1 November. However, there was good news before the month was up as it was confirmed that Matty Fryatt had extended his deal at the club for a further month.

=== November ===
More good news in terms of signings came on the first day of November when a loanee from the end of last season re-joined the club on a youth loan. This was Sunderland striker Connor Wickham. Wickham started alongside Matty Fryatt the following weekend as the Owls faced recently relegated (from the Premier League) Reading at Hillsborough Stadium. Reading were looking for more likely to score in the early exchanges as they had a couple of half chances saved and go wide. But it was on 18-minutes when a fantastic long-ball by Kamil Zayatte found Michail Antonio in the box whom waited on the touchline, pulled back for Matty Fryatt to smash the ball home to give Wednesday the lead. 7-minutes later and Seyi Olofinjana found Antonio just inside Reading's area, Antonio flicked the ball over the opposition defender ran towards the goal and let fly just outside the area and the ball curled into the far corner, giving the Owls a surprise 2–0 lead. However, soon after and Reading were back in the game as a cross found the free head of Pavel Pogrebnyak whose header went in off the post. The first-half seemed full of goals as just six-minutes after Reading's goal back, a mistake at the back by Reading saw Antonio set Connor Wickham free whose shot went straight at the keeper but bounced onto the opposition player chasing Wickham down and rolled into the back of the net for an own goal, Sheffield Wednesday went into the break two goals to the good. Could Sheffield Wednesday finally win their first game of the season? It looked doubtful at the beginning of the second half as Reading started again as the better side as they again went close with two-chances, one from long and one from short distance. However, just before the hour mark Antonio did a volley/cross into the box, just keeping the ball in play in the process, and the ball deflected up to Wickham who chest controlled the ball and volleyed into the top corner of the net. Unbelievably, Wednesday were 4–1 up with half an hour to play. And it just got better five-minutes later as Matty Fryatt was set through on goal and he chipped the ball over the keeper to score his second of the game. Adam Le Fondre score from a penalty that shouldn't have been in stoppage time, but it was only a consolation as the Owls finally got their first win of the season... And it was a big win. Unfortunately, Sheffield Wednesday then went on a three-game losing streak to end November, losing to Derby County, Huddersfield Town and Blackpool. This led to Sheffield Wednesday being six points behind relegation.

=== December ===
Manager Dave Jones was sacked on 1 December 2013. Stuart Gray took over as manager on a temporary basis and was appointed permanently on 25 January 2014.

== Players ==
=== First-team squad ===
As of 27 March 2014

Note: Flags indicate national team as defined under FIFA eligibility rules; some limited exceptions apply. Players may hold more than one non-FIFA nationality.

No.	Pos.	Nation	Player
1	GK	ENG	Chris Kirkland
2	DF	ENG	Lewis Buxton
3	DF	BEN	Réda Johnson (Vice-Captain)
4	DF	ENG	Anthony Gardner (Captain)
5	DF	GUI	Kamil Zayatte
6	MF	POR	José Semedo
7	MF	ENG	Michail Antonio
8	DF	USA	Oguchi Onyewu
10	MF	COD	Jacques Maghoma
11	MF	JAM	Jermaine Johnson
13	GK	ENG	Adam Davies
14	MF	ENG	Giles Coke
15	DF	ENG	Martin Taylor
17	MF	FRA	Jérémy Hélan

No.	Pos.	Nation	Player
18	FW	SCO	Chris Maguire
19	DF	ENG	Joe Mattock
20	MF	ENG	Kieran Lee
21	MF	IRL	Paul Corry
22	MF	SCO	Liam Palmer
25	FW	NIR	Caolan Lavery
26	GK	ARG	Emiliano Martínez (on loan from Arsenal)
28	FW	ENG	Benik Afobe (on loan from Arsenal)
32	DF	ESP	Miguel Llera
34	FW	ALB	Atdhe Nuhiu
35	DF	ENG	Adedeji Oshilaja (on loan from Cardiff City)
36	DF	NED	Glenn Loovens
41	DF	ENG	Sam Hutchinson (on loan from Chelsea)
42	FW	IRL	Leon Best (on loan from Blackburn Rovers)

==== Out on loan ====
Note: Flags indicate national team as defined under FIFA eligibility rules; some limited exceptions apply. Players may hold more than one non-FIFA nationality.

No.	Pos.	Nation	Player
9	FW	ENG	Gary Madine (on loan at Carlisle United)
12	MF	ENG	David Prutton (on loan at Coventry City)
16	MF	SCO	Rhys McCabe (on loan at Portsmouth)
23	MF	ENG	Danny Mayor (on loan at Bury)

No.	Pos.	Nation	Player
30	GK	ENG	Arron Jameson (on loan at Bradford City)
31	GK	ENG	Cameron Dawson (on loan at Plymouth Argyle)
—	GK	ENG	Joe Wildsmith (on loan at Alfreton Town)

=== Development squad ===
Note: Flags indicate national team as defined under FIFA eligibility rules; some limited exceptions apply. Players may hold more than one non-FIFA nationality.

No.	Pos.	Nation	Player
24	DF	POR	Rafael Floro
33	FW	SUI	Anđelko Savić (on loan from Sampdoria)
38	DF	ENG	Taylor McKenzie
—	DF	ENG	Johnny Fenwick

No.	Pos.	Nation	Player
—	MF	ENG	Adam Hinchliffe
—	MF	ENG	Ayo Obileye
—	FW	ENG	Emmanuel Dieseruvwe
—	FW	FRA	Khalil Lambin

=== Academy ===
Note: Flags indicate national team as defined under FIFA eligibility rules; some limited exceptions apply. Players may hold more than one non-FIFA nationality.

No.	Pos.	Nation	Player
37	FW	FRA	Franck Betra
39	MF	ENG	Jack Stobbs
—	DF	ENG	Brad Beatson
—	DF	NIR	Seanna Foster
69	DF	NOR	Simen Lenes
—	DF	ENG	Harry Frost
—	DF	ENG	Adam Harvey
—	DF	ENG	Emmanuel Kanteh
—	DF	ENG	Ryan Lee
—	MF	ENG	Rhys Davies

No.	Pos.	Nation	Player
—	MF	ENG	Charlie Dawes
—	MF	ENG	Jake Ellam
—	MF	NIR	Simon Hanna
—	MF	ENG	Luke Smith
—	MF	ENG	Jack Taylor
—	FW	ENG	Jonathan Fusco
—	FW	NIR	Sean Mullan
41	FW	NOR	Thomas Oeiseth

=== International Call-Ups ===
No	Pos	Name	Team	Competition	Opposition	Date	Caps	Goals	Ref
—	GK	(England) Cameron Dawson	England U-19	2013 UEFA European Championship Elite Qualifier	Georgia U-19, Belgium U-19, Scotland U-19	24 May 2013, 26 May 2013, 29 May 2013	4	0	
11	MF	(Jamaica) Jermaine Johnson	Jamaica	Friendly, 2014 FIFA World Cup Qualifier	Tottenham Hotspur, Bahamas, Mexico, United States, Honduras	23 May 2013, 31 May 2013, 4 June 2013, 7 June 2013, 11 June 2013	74	9	
25	FW	(Northern Ireland) Caolan Lavery	Northern Ireland U-21	Friendly	Denmark U-21	14 August 2013	2	0	
11	MF	(Jamaica) Jermaine Johnson	Jamaica	2014 FIFA World Cup Qualifier	Panama, Costa Rica	6 September 2013, 10 September 2013	75	9	
3	DF	(Benin) Réda Johnson	Benin	2014 FIFA World Cup Qualifier	Rwanda	8 September 2013	10	0	
5	DF	(Guinea) Kamil Zayatte	Guinea	2014 FIFA World Cup Qualifier	Egypt	10 September 2013	45	4	
11	MF	(Jamaica) Jermaine Johnson	Jamaica	2014 FIFA World Cup Qualifier	United States, Honduras	11 October 2013, 15 October 2013	75	9	
—	MF	(Northern Ireland) Simon Hanna	Northern Ireland U-19	2014 UEFA Euro U-19 Qualifier	Belgium U-19, France U-19, Iceland U-19	10 October 2013, 12 October 2013, 15 October 2013	3	1	
25	FW	(Northern Ireland) Caolan Lavery	Northern Ireland U-21	2015 UEFA Euro U-21 Qualifier	Italy U-21, Cyprus U-21	14 November 2013, 19 November 2013	4	0	
8	DF	(United States) Oguchi Onyewu	United States	Friendly	Ukraine	5 March 2014	69	6	
25	FW	(Northern Ireland) Caolan Lavery	Northern Ireland U-21	2015 UEFA Euro U-21 Qualifier	Italy U-21	5 March 2014	5	0	

=== Squad information ===
As of 3 May 2014

No	Pos	Nat	Name	Age	Joined	From	Contract Expires	Fee	Apps	Goals
1	GK	(England)	Chris Kirkland	32	July 2012	Wigan Athletic	June 2014	Free	83	0
2	DF	(England)	Lewis Buxton	29	August 2008	Stoke City	June 2015	£88,000	197	6
3	DF	(Benin)	Réda Johnson	25	January 2011	Plymouth Argyle	June 2014	£110,000	88	19
4	DF	(England)	Anthony Gardner	32	July 2012	Crystal Palace	June 2014	Free	44	0
5	DF	(Guinea)	Kamil Zayatte	28	August 2013	Istanbul BB	June 2015	Free	12	2
6	MF	(Portugal)	José Semedo	28	July 2011	Charlton Athletic	June 2014	Free	107	1
7	MF	(England)	Michail Antonio	23	August 2012	Reading	June 2016	Undisclosed	85	18
8	DF	(United States)	Oguchi Onyewu	31	January 2014	Queens Park Rangers	June 2014	Free	19	1
9	FW	(England)	Gary Madine	23	January 2011	Carlisle United	June 2015	£1,056,000	101	27
10	MF	(Democratic Republic of the Congo)	Jacques Maghoma	25	July 2013	Burton Albion	June 2015	Undisclosed	29	3
11	MF	(Jamaica)	Jermaine Johnson	33	January 2007	Bradford City	June 2014	£660,000	249	30
12	MF	(England)	David Prutton	31	July 2011	Swindon Town	June 2014	Free	61	3
13	GK	(England)	Adam Davies	21	June 2013	Free Agent	June 2014	Free	0	0
14	MF	(England)	Giles Coke	27	July 2010	Motherwell	June 2015	Free	82	6
15	DF	(England)	Martin Taylor	33	August 2012	Watford	June 2014	Undisclosed	13	0
16	MF	(Scotland)	Rhys McCabe	21	July 2012	Rangers	June 2015	Free	32	2
17	MF	(France)	Jérémy Hélan	21	July 2013	Manchester City	June 2017	Undisclosed	76	3
18	FW	(Scotland)	Chris Maguire	24	July 2012	Derby County	June 2015	Undisclosed	46	11
19	DF	(England)	Joe Mattock	23	July 2012	West Bromwich Albion	June 2015	Free	36	3
20	DF	(England)	Kieran Lee	25	July 2012	Oldham Athletic	June 2015	Free	55	1
21	MF	(Republic of Ireland)	Paul Corry	22	August 2012	University College Dublin	June 2015	Undisclosed	9	0
22	MF	(Scotland)	Liam Palmer	21	January 2013	Sheffield Wednesday Academy	June 2018	Free	79	1
23	MF	(England)	Danny Mayor	22	August 2012	Preston North End	June 2015	Undisclosed	9	0
24	DF	(Portugal)	Rafael Floro	19	August 2013	FC Porto	June 2014	Free	2	0
25	FW	(Northern Ireland)	Caolan Lavery	20	July 2012	Ipswich Town	Unknown	Free	24	4
26	GK	(Argentina)	Emiliano Martínez	21	October 2013	Arsenal	May 2014	Loan	15	0
28	FW	(England)	Benik Afobe	20	January 2014	Arsenal	June 2014	Loan	13	2
30	GK	(England)	Arron Jameson	23	July 2008	Sheffield Wednesday Academy	June 2014	Free	2	0
31	GK	(England)	Cameron Dawson	18	April 2013	Sheffield Wednesday Academy	June 2016	Free	0	0
32	DF	(Spain)	Miguel Llera	34	January 2012	Blackpool	June 2014	Free	93	11
33	FW	(Switzerland)	Anđelko Savić	20	August 2013	Sampdoria	June 2014	Loan	1	0
34	FW	(Austria)	Atdhe Nuhiu	24	July 2013	Rapid Wien	June 2016	Free	43	8
35	DF	(England)	Adedeji Oshilaja	20	February 2014	Cardiff City	May 2014	Loan	2	0
36	DF	(Netherlands)	Glenn Loovens	30	December 2013	Free Agent	May 2014	Free	25	0
37	FW	(France)	Franck Betra	17	August 2013	Sheffield Wednesday Academy	June 2014	Free	0	0
38	DF	(England)	Taylor McKenzie	19	October 2012	Sheffield Wednesday Academy	June 2014	Free	0	0
39	MF	(England)	Jack Stobbs	17	Unknown	Sheffield Wednesday Academy	Unknown	Free	1	0
41	DF	(England)	Sam Hutchinson	24	February 2014	Chelsea	April 2014	Loan	10	1
42	FW	(Republic of Ireland)	Leon Best	27	February 2014	Blackburn Rovers	May 2014	Loan	29	7

=== Player Debuts ===
Players making their first team Sheffield Wednesday début in a fully competitive match.

#	Position	Player	Date	Opponents	Ground	Ref
5	DF	(Guinea) Kamil Zayatte	3 August 2013	Queens Park Rangers	Loftus Road	
34	FW	(Albania) Atdhe Nuhiu	3 August 2013	Queens Park Rangers	Loftus Road	
10	MF	(Democratic Republic of the Congo) Jacques Maghoma	3 August 2013	Queens Park Rangers	Loftus Road	
24	DF	(Portugal) Rafael Floro	6 August 2013	Rotherham United	New York Stadium	
25	FW	(Northern Ireland) Caolan Lavery	10 August 2013	Burnley	Hillsborough Stadium	
26	DF	(England) Jordan Spence	31 August 2013	Middlesbrough	Riverside Stadium	
8	DF	(England) Roger Johnson	21 September 2013	Birmingham City	St Andrew's	
27	MF	(Republic of Ireland) Stephen McPhail	21 September 2013	Birmingham City	St Andrew's	
28	FW	(England) Matty Fryatt	28 September 2013	Doncaster Rovers	Hillsborough Stadium	
26	GK	(Argentina) Emiliano Martínez	23 November 2013	Huddersfield Town	Hillsborough Stadium	
36	DF	(Netherlands) Glenn Loovens	3 December 2013	Leicester City	Hillsborough Stadium	
33	FW	(Switzerland) Anđelko Savić	21 December 2013	Bournemouth	Hillsborough Stadium	
8	DF	(United States) Oguchi Onyewu	18 January 2014	Burnley	Turf Moor	
28	FW	(England) Benik Afobe	1 February 2014	Barnsley	Hillsborough Stadium	
35	DF	(England) Adedeji Oshilaja	11 February 2014	Wigan Athletic	Hillsborough Stadium	
40	MF	(England) Gary Gardner	18 February 2014	Derby County	Hillsborough Stadium	
42	FW	(Republic of Ireland) Leon Best	18 February 2014	Derby County	Hillsborough Stadium	
41	DF	(England) Sam Hutchinson	18 February 2014	Derby County	Hillsborough Stadium	
39	MF	(England) Jack Stobbs	26 April 2014	Bolton Wanderers	Hillsborough Stadium	

=== Début Goals ===
Players scoring their first goal while playing their first game for Sheffield Wednesday in a competitive fixture.

#	Position	Player	Date	Opponents	Ground	Ref
34	FW	(Austria) Atdhe Nuhiu	3 August 2013	Queens Park Rangers	Loftus Road	

=== Transfers ===
==== In ====
Position	Player	Transferred from	Fee	Date	Source
MF	(Democratic Republic of the Congo) Jacques Maghoma	Burton Albion	Free	1 July 2013	
MF	(France) Jérémy Hélan	Manchester City	Undisclosed	12 July 2013	
FW	(Austria) Atdhe Nuhiu	Rapid Wien	Free	25 July 2013	
DF	(Guinea) Kamil Zayatte	Istanbul BB	Free	2 August 2013	
DF	(Portugal) Rafael Floro	FC Porto	Free	6 August 2013	
FW	(France) Khalil Lambin	Ergotelis	Free	12 August 2013	
MF	(Republic of Ireland) Stephen McPhail	Free Agent	Free	20 September 2013	
MF	(Nigeria) Seyi Olofinjana	Free Agent	Free	26 October 2013	
DF	(Netherlands) Glenn Loovens	Free Agent	Free	3 December 2013	
DF	(United States) Oguchi Onyewu	Free Agent	Free	11 January 2014	

==== Out ====
#	Position	Player	Transferred to	Fee	Date	Source
—	MF	(France) Bastien Héry	Rochdale	Free	8 May 2013	
—	DF	(England) Julian Bennett	Released	Free	16 May 2013	
—	FW	(Australia) Matthew Fletcher	Released	Free	16 May 2013	
—	MF	(England) Harry Grant	Released	Free	16 May 2013	
—	MF	(Slovenia) Nejc Pečnik	Left by mutual consent	Free	16 May 2013	
—	GK	(England) Nicky Weaver	Released	Free	16 May 2013	
—	FW	(England) Chris O'Grady	Barnsley	Undisclosed	19 June 2013	
—	DF	(England) Hayden White	Bolton Wanderers	Free (Compensation package agreed)	24 June 2013	
—	GK	(England) Stephen Bywater	Millwall	Free	24 June 2013	
—	MF	(England) Chris Lines	Left by mutual consent	Free	4 July 2013	
27	MF	(Republic of Ireland) Stephen McPhail	Shamrock Rovers	Free	21 February 2014	

==== Loan in ====
#	Position	Player	Transferred from	Length	Date	Source
33	FW	(Switzerland) Anđelko Savić	Sampdoria	Season-long loan	23 August 2013	
26	DF	(England) Jordan Spence	West Ham United	1-month loan	31 August 2013	
8	DF	(England) Roger Johnson	Wolverhampton Wanderers	3-month loan	16 September 2013	
—	DF	(England) George Swan	Manchester City	1-month youth loan	17 September 2013	
28	FW	(England) Matty Fryatt	Hull City	28-days	27 September 2013	
26	GK	(Argentina) Emiliano Martínez	Arsenal	28-days	15 October 2013	
28	FW	(England) Matty Fryatt	Hull City	28-days	29 October 2013	
29	FW	(England) Connor Wickham	Sunderland	1-month recurring youth loan (Recalled 27 January 2014)	1 November 2013	
26	GK	(Argentina) Emiliano Martínez	Arsenal	1-month 18-days	14 November 2013	
26	GK	(Argentina) Emiliano Martínez	Arsenal	End-of-the-season	3 January 2014	
28	FW	(England) Benik Afobe	Arsenal	End-of-the-season	30 January 2014	
35	DF	(England) Adedeji Oshilaja	Cardiff City	1-month	7 January 2014	
40	MF	(England) Gary Gardner	Aston Villa	1-month	12 February 2014	
42	FW	(Republic of Ireland) Leon Best	Blackburn Rovers	1-month	14 February 2014	
41	DF	(England) Sam Hutchinson	Chelsea	1-month	14 February 2014	
42	FW	(Republic of Ireland) Leon Best	Blackburn Rovers	End-of-the-season	14 March 2014	
41	DF	(England) Sam Hutchinson	Chelsea	1-month	14 March 2014	
35	DF	(England) Adedeji Oshilaja	Cardiff City	End-of-the-season	21 March 2014	

==== Loan out ====
#	Position	Player	Loaned to	Length	Date	Source
23	MF	(England) Danny Mayor	Bury	Season-long loan	2 August 2013	
15	DF	(England) Martin Taylor	Brentford	28-day loan	10 September 2013	
—	FW	(England) Emmanuel Dieseruvwe	Hyde	1-month youth loan	13 September 2013	
—	DF	(England) Taylor McKenzie	Gainsborough Trinity	1-month youth loan	17 September 2013	
—	FW	(England) Emmanuel Dieseruvwe	Fleetwood Town	1-month youth loan	1 November 2013	
25	FW	(Northern Ireland) Caolan Lavery	Plymouth Argyle	1-month	22 November 2013	
18	FW	(Scotland) Chris Maguire	Coventry City	1-month	28 November 2013	
30	GK	(England) Arron Jameson	Stalybridge Celtic	1-month	29 November 2013	
25	FW	(Northern Ireland) Caolan Lavery	Plymouth Argyle	1-month (Recalled on 8 January 2014)	3 January 2014	
30	GK	(England) Arron Jameson	Bradford City	1-month	10 January 2014	
38	DF	(England) Taylor McKenzie	Gainsborough Trinity	1-month	16 January 2014	
31	GK	(England) Cameron Dawson	Plymouth Argyle	End-of-the-season	7 February 2014	
16	MF	(Scotland) Rhys McCabe	Portsmouth	End-of-the-season (Recalled on 24 April 2014)	17 March 2014	
—	GK	(England) Joe Wildsmith	Alfreton Town	28-days	27 March 2014	
9	FW	(England) Gary Madine	Carlisle United	End-of-the-season	27 March 2014	
12	MF	(England) David Prutton	Coventry City	End-of-the-season	27 March 2014	

=== Contracts ===
Position	Player	Length	Date	Expiry	Source
GK	(England) Cameron Dawson	3 years	22 April 2013	30 June 2016	
DF	(England) Johnny Fenwick	1 year	1 May 2013	30 June 2014	
FW	(England) Emmanuel Dieseruvwe	1 year	1 May 2013	30 June 2014	
DF	(England) Ayo Obileye	1 year	10 May 2013	30 June 2014	
DF	(England) Lewis Buxton	2-years	31 May 2013	June 2015	
MF	(England) David Prutton	1-year	25 June 2013	June 2014	
DF	(Spain) Miguel Llera	1-year	27 June 2013	June 2014	
MF	(England) Giles Coke	2-years	28 June 2013	June 2015	
GK	(England) Adam Davies	1-year	28 June 2013	June 2014	
MF	(Jamaica) Jermaine Johnson	1-year	4 July 2013	June 2014	
MF	(England) Adam Hinchliffe	1-year	July 2013	June 2014	—
GK	(England) Joe Wildsmith	2.5-years	19 November 2013	June 2016	
MF	(Nigeria) Seyi Olofinjana	1-month	28 November 2013	December 2013	
DF	(Netherlands) Glenn Loovens	5-months	31 December 2013	May 2014	
MF	(Republic of Ireland) Stephen McPhail	1-month	21 January 2014	February 2014	
MF	(England) Jack Stobbs	1-year	19 March 2014	June 2015	
FW	(Northern Ireland) Caolan Lavery	Long-term	21 March 2014	Unknown	
MF	(Scotland) Liam Palmer	3-year extension	27 March 2014	June 2018	

== Fixtures and Results ==
=== Pre-season ===
6 July 2013	Sheffield Wednesday	1–1	Steaua București	St George's Park National Football Centre
14:00	Llera 67'	Report	Popa 20'	Attendance: 0

9 July 2013	Stockport County	0–3	Sheffield Wednesday	Edgeley Park
19:45		Report	Antonio 1'; Taylor 12'; Maguire 45' (pen.)	Attendance: 2,083

13 July 2013	Scunthorpe United	0–1	Sheffield Wednesday	Glanford Park
15:00		Report	Hélan 41'	Attendance: 2,393

16 July 2013	Sporting Braga	3–1	Sheffield Wednesday	Estádio Municipal de Albufeira
20:00	Baiano 41'; Pardo 45'; Pedro 69'	Report	Taylor 19'

20 July 2013	Hull City	0–0	Sheffield Wednesday	Estádio Municipal de Albufeira
20:00		Report

24 July 2013	Sheffield Wednesday	1–0	Rangers	Hillsborough Stadium
20:00	Antonio 12'	Report		Attendance: 16,248

27 July 2013	Chesterfield	1–1	Sheffield Wednesday	Proact Stadium
15:00	Roberts 29'	Report	Maguire 88'	Attendance: 5,491

=== Football League Championship ===
3 August 2013 1	Queens Park Rangers	2–1	Sheffield Wednesday	Loftus Road
15:00	Onuoha 40'; Johnson 43'; Barton (yellow card) 57'	Report	Nuhiu 19'; Palmer (yellow card) 20'; Maghoma (yellow card) 57'	Attendance: 17,626

10 August 2013 2	Sheffield Wednesday	1–2	Burnley	Hillsborough Stadium
15:00	Hélan (yellow card) 45'; Maghoma (yellow card) 59'; Gardner (yellow card) 62'; Prutton 71'	Report	Ings 33'; Vokes 38'; Shackell (yellow card) 58'; Jones (yellow card) 77'; Edgar (yellow card) 85'	Attendance: 22,282

17 August 2013 3	Leeds United	1–1	Sheffield Wednesday	Elland Road
12:15	McCormack 58'	Report	Maguire (yellow card) 23'; Zayatte 36'; Buxton (yellow card) 56'	Attendance: 23,766

24 August 2013 4	Sheffield Wednesday	2–2	Millwall	Hillsborough Stadium
15:00	R. Johnson 7'; Hélan 21'; Zayatte (yellow card) 89'	Report	Zayatte 5' (o.g.); N'Guessan (yellow card) 73'; Keogh 87' (pen.)	Attendance: 20,009

31 August 2013 5	Middlesbrough	1–1	Sheffield Wednesday	Riverside Stadium
15:00	Carayol 49'	Report	Antonio 35'; Prutton (yellow card) 84'	Attendance: 15,964

14 September 2013 6	Sheffield Wednesday	1–1	Yeovil Town	Hillsborough Stadium
15:00	Nuhiu 25' (yellow card) 42'; Llera (yellow card) 31'; J. Johnson (yellow card) 82'	Report	Webster (red card) 41'; Ralls 64'; Edwards (yellow card) 67'	Attendance: 22,328

21 September 2013 7	Birmingham City	4–1	Sheffield Wednesday	St Andrew's
15:00	Lingard 20', 29', 33', 51'; Green (yellow card) 45+3'; Ferguson (yellow card) 90+4'	Report	Prutton (yellow card) 57'; Zayatte 66'	Attendance: 14,379

28 September 2013 8	Sheffield Wednesday	0–1	Doncaster Rovers	Hillsborough Stadium
15:00	Nuhiu (yellow card) 21'; Spence (yellow card) 51'	Report	Wellens (yellow card) 13'; Keegan (yellow card) 45+1'; Macheda 71'; Brown (yellow card) 89'	Attendance: 21,871

1 October 2013 9	Brighton & Hove Albion	1–1	Sheffield Wednesday	Falmer Stadium
19:45	Andrews (yellow card) 40' (goal) 89'; LuaLua (yellow card) 76'; Barnes (yellow card) 90+1'	Report	Semedo (yellow card) 40'; Fryatt 43'; Llera (yellow card) 57'; Kirkland (yellow card) 70'; Buxton (yellow card) 77'	Attendance: 25,725

5 October 2013 10	Sheffield Wednesday	1–1	Ipswich Town	Hillsborough Stadium
15:00	Antonio 14'; J. Johnson (yellow card) 90'	Report	Anderson 12'; Smith (yellow card) 78'	Attendance: 19,599

19 October 2013 11	Bolton Wanderers	1–1	Sheffield Wednesday	Reebok Stadium
15:00	Beckford 16'; Baptiste (yellow card) 78'; Hall (yellow card) 81'	Report	Baptiste 26' (o.g.); McPhail (yellow card) 75'; Semedo (red card) 85'	Attendance: 17,177

26 October 2013 12	Barnsley	1–1	Sheffield Wednesday	Oakwell
12:15	Pedersen 16' (yellow card) 66'	Report	Fryatt 60'; Réda Johnson (yellow card) 66'; Nuhiu (yellow card) 88'	Attendance: 13,268

2 November 2013 13	Sheffield Wednesday	5–2	Reading	Hillsborough Stadium
15:00	Fryatt 18', 63'; Antonio 25'; Morrison 42' (o.g.); Wickham 57'; Réda Johnson (yellow card) 90+1'	Report	Pogrebnyak 35'; Kelly (yellow card) 52'; Le Fondre 90' (pen.)	Attendance: 20,368

9 November 2013 14	Derby County	3–0	Sheffield Wednesday	Pride Park Stadium
15:00	Buxton 45'; Hughes 49'; Martin 58'; Cissé (yellow card) 61'	Report	McPhail (yellow card) 28'; Roger Johnson (yellow card) 29'; Réda Johnson (yellow card) 38'; Palmer (yellow card) 90+3'	Attendance: 26,421

23 November 2013 15	Sheffield Wednesday	1–2	Huddersfield Town	Hillsborough Stadium
12:15	McPhail (yellow card) 33'; Llera (yellow card) 44'; Wickham 90+3'	Report	Paterson 11'; Clayton (yellow card) 15' (goal) 68'; Vaughan (yellow card) 31'; Smith (yellow card) 84'; Smithies (yellow card) 90+4'	Attendance: 19,338

30 November 2013 16	Blackpool	2–0	Sheffield Wednesday	Bloomfield Road
15:00	Dobbie (yellow card) 3'; Fuller 6'; Osbourne (yellow card) 25'; Gosling (yellow card) 59' (goal) 73'	Report	Semedo (yellow card) 74'; J. Johnson (yellow card) 87'	Attendance: 14,452

3 December 2013 17	Sheffield Wednesday	2–1	Leicester City	Hillsborough Stadium
19:45	Wickham 9', 25'; Mattock (yellow card) 45'	Report	Knockaert 3'	Attendance: 20,016

7 December 2013 18	Sheffield Wednesday	0–1	Nottingham Forest	Hillsborough Stadium
15:00	Loovens (yellow card) 19'; Olofinjana (yellow card) 62'	Report	Cox 48'; Lascelles (yellow card) 52'	Attendance: 23,414

14 December 2013 19	Watford	0–1	Sheffield Wednesday	Vicarage Road
15:00		Report	Wickham 24' (yellow card) 70'; Roger Johnson (yellow card) 32'; Lee (yellow card) 67'; Hélan (yellow card) 83'	Attendance: 15,476

18 December 2013	Sheffield Wednesday	A–A	Wigan Athletic	Hillsborough Stadium
19:45		Report	McClean 24'; Carson (yellow card) 53'; McArthur (yellow card) 55'	Attendance: 22,700 (approx.)
Note: Match abandoned after 59-minutes due to waterlogged pitch

21 December 2013 20	Sheffield Wednesday	1–2	Bournemouth	Hillsborough Stadium
15:00	Réda Johnson (yellow card) 46'; Maghoma 82'	Report	Ritchie 10'; Grabban 27'; Elphick (yellow card) 71'	Attendance: 21,057

26 December 2013 21	Blackburn Rovers	0–0	Sheffield Wednesday	Ewood Park
15:00	Henley (yellow card) 54'; Spurr (yellow card) 87'	Report		Attendance: 18,539

29 December 2013 22	Charlton Athletic	1–1	Sheffield Wednesday	The Valley
15:00	Stephens 47'; Evina (yellow card) 88'; Green (yellow card) 90+3'	Report	McPhail (yellow card) 25'; Wickham 59'; Palmer (yellow card) 62'	Attendance: 16,377; Referee: F. Graham

1 January 2014 23	Sheffield Wednesday	2–0	Blackpool	Hillsborough Stadium
15:00	Wickham 51'; Maghoma (yellow card) 58'; Maguire 60'; Réda Johnson (yellow card) 62'	Report	Fuller (yellow card) 45+1'	Attendance: 19,447; Referee: D. Whitestone

11 January 2014 24	Sheffield Wednesday	6–0	Leeds United	Hillsborough Stadium
12:15	Llera (yellow card) 14'; R. Johnson 20'; Loovens (yellow card) 42'; Nuhiu 45'; Wickham 50'; Maguire (yellow card) 52' (goal) 67'; Lavery 80', 90+4'	Report	Smith (red card) 47'; Pearce (yellow card) 51'	Attendance: 21,224; Referee: L. Probert

18 January 2014 25	Burnley	1–1	Sheffield Wednesday	Turf Moor
15:00	Vokes 43'; Marney (yellow card) 87'	Report	Maguire 45' (yellow card) 78'; Semedo (yellow card) 64'; Wickham (yellow card) 68'; Mattock (yellow card) 81'	Attendance: 13,735; Referee: S. Attwell

28 January 2014 26	Millwall	1–1	Sheffield Wednesday	The Den
19:45	Martin (yellow card) 45'; Campbell 80'; Lowry (red card) 89'; Bywater (yellow card) 89'	Report	Coke 69' (red card) 89'; Nuhiu (yellow card) 89'	Attendance: 10,624; Referee: L. Probert

1 February 2014 27	Sheffield Wednesday	1–0	Barnsley	Hillsborough Stadium
15:00	Maguire (yellow card) 46' (goal) 90+7'; J. Johnson (red card) 80'	Report	Frimpong (yellow card) 24' (red card) 30'; Hunt (yellow card) 53'; Mellis (red card) 90+1'	Attendance: 25,139; Referee: A. Marriner

8 February 2014 28	Reading	0–2	Sheffield Wednesday	Madjeski Stadium
15:00	Pearce (red card) 9'; McAnuff (yellow card) 45'	Report	Maguire 10' (pen.) (yellow card) 42'; McCabe (yellow card) 13'; Llera (yellow card) 52'; Afobe 58'; Hélan (yellow card) 68'	Attendance: 19,772; Referee: K. Hill

11 February 2014 29	Sheffield Wednesday	0–3	Wigan Athletic	Hillsborough Stadium
19:45	Semedo (yellow card) 36'; Llera (yellow card) 45+2'	Report	Maynard 31', 38'; Waghorn (yellow card) 74'; Perch (yellow card) 88'; Fortuné 90+3'	Attendance: 25,279; Referee: D. Webb

18 February 2014 30	Sheffield Wednesday	0–1	Derby County	Hillsborough Stadium
19:45	Llera (yellow card) 35'; Hélan (yellow card) 59'; Hutchinson (yellow card) 74'	Report	Martin (yellow card) 37'; Bryson (yellow card) 40'; Forsyth (yellow card) 53'; Bamford 78'	Attendance: 21,039; Referee: D. Bond

22 February 2014 31	Huddersfield Town	0–2	Sheffield Wednesday	John Smith's Stadium
15:00	Smith (yellow card) 54'; Gerrard (yellow card) 78'	Report	Palmer (yellow card) 28'; Hélan 40'; Hutchinson (yellow card) 50'; G. Gardner (yellow card) 65'; Maghoma 72'	Attendance: 16,499; Referee: N. Swarbrick

1 March 2014 32	Sheffield Wednesday	1–0	Middlesbrough	Hillsborough Stadium
15:00	Nuhiu 87' (pen.) (yellow card) 88'; Coke (yellow card) 90'	Report	Friend (yellow card) 42'; Whitehead (yellow card) 36' (yellow-red card) 86'	Attendance: 20,743; Referee: D'Urso

8 March 2014 33	Yeovil Town	2–0	Sheffield Wednesday	Huish Park
15:00	Miller 41', 51'; Dawson (yellow card) 83'	Report	Palmer (yellow card) 24'; G. Gardner (yellow card) 31'; Hutchinson (yellow card) 85' (yellow-red card) 89'; Loovens (yellow card) 90+4'	Attendance: 6,251; Referee: D. Sheldrake

12 March 2014 34	Wigan Athletic	1–0	Sheffield Wednesday	DW Stadium
19:45	Al-Habsi (yellow card) 35'; Gómez (yellow card) 41' (goal) 88' (pen.)	Report	Best (penalty missed) 37'; Hélan (yellow card) 71'	Attendance: 15,039; Referee: Andy Haines

15 March 2014 35	Sheffield Wednesday	4–1	Birmingham City	Hillsborough Stadium
15:00	Lavery 16', 68' (yellow card) 17'; Best 21'; Packwood 58' (o.g.)	Report	Spector (yellow card) 65'; Novak 80'	Attendance: 20,637; Referee: S. Martin

18 March 2014 36	Sheffield Wednesday	3–0	Queens Park Rangers	Hillsborough Stadium
19:45	Buxton (yellow card) 29' (goal) 71'; Maguire 35' (pen.); Best 51'	Report	Dunne (red card) 33'	Attendance: 18,029; Referee: P. Tierney

22 March 2014 37	Doncaster Rovers	1–0	Sheffield Wednesday	Keepmoat Stadium
15:00	Brown 32'	Report	Hutchinson (yellow card) 89'	Attendance: 12,609; Referee: M. Dean

25 March 2014 38	Sheffield Wednesday	1–0	Brighton & Hove Albion	Hillsborough Stadium
19:45	Best 90+1'	Report	Ince (yellow card) 90+9'	Attendance: 18,192; Referee: A. Taylor

29 March 2014 39	Sheffield Wednesday	1–4	Watford	Hillsborough Stadium
15:00	Afobe 54'; Lee (yellow card) 71'	Report	Angella 5' (yellow card) 38'; McGugan 23'; Pudil (yellow card) 42'; Deeney 49', 51'; Tőzsér (yellow card) 56'	Attendance: 22,057; Referee: M. Heywood

4 April 2014 40	Leicester City	2–1	Sheffield Wednesday	King Power Stadium
19:45	Mahrez 10'; Schlupp (yellow card) 48'; Knockaert 61'	Report	Antonio 37'; Palmer (yellow card) 45+1'; Lee (yellow card) 60'	Attendance: 26,103; Referee: G. Scott

8 April 2014 41	Nottingham Forest	3–3	Sheffield Wednesday	The City Ground
19:45	Lansbury (yellow card) 14'; Lascelles (yellow card) 26'; Mackie (yellow card) 34' (goal) 44'; Collins (yellow card) 55' (red card) 80'; Tudgay 77'; Paterson 87'	Report	Maguire 15' (pen.); Antonio (yellow card) 38'; Mattock (yellow card) 41' (goal) 57'; Buxton 45+3'; Hélan (yellow card) 77'	Attendance: 20,185; Referee: S. Duncan

12 April 2014 42	Sheffield Wednesday	3–3	Blackburn Rovers	Hillsborough Stadium
15:07*	Buxton 30'; Llera (yellow card) 45+1'; Nuhiu 72', 90+5' (yellow card) 83'; Hutchinson (yellow card) 75'; Afobe (yellow card) 89'	Report	Rhodes 15' (yellow card) 90+1'; Conway 36'; Keane 43'; Hanley (yellow card) 56'; Williamson (yellow card) 75'; Gestede (yellow card) 80'	Attendance: 22,792; Referee: F. Graham
Note: *All English and Welsh football matches kicked off at 15:07 for the 25th anniversary of the Hillsborough disaster.

18 April 2014 43	Bournemouth	2–4	Sheffield Wednesday	Dean Court
15:00	Surman (yellow card) 15'; Pugh 31'; Kermorgant 57'; Elphick (yellow card) 84'	Report	Nuhiu 16'; Hutchinson 34' (yellow card) 45+1' (red card) 63'; Maguire (yellow card) 71' (goal) 90+6'; Best 86'	Attendance: 10,864; Referee: T. Robinson

21 April 2014 44	Sheffield Wednesday	2–3	Charlton Athletic	Hillsborough Stadium
15:00	Nuhiu 3'; Maguire 8' (yellow card) 9'; Lee (yellow card) 79'; Hélan (yellow card) 86'	Report	Sordell 10', 43', 63'; Morrison (yellow card) 22'	Attendance: 20,557; Referee: T. Harrington

26 April 2014 45	Sheffield Wednesday	1–3	Bolton Wanderers	Hillsborough Stadium
15:00	Mattock 38'; Onyewu (yellow card) 57'; Nuhiu (yellow card) 59'	Report	Danns 8' (yellow card) 18'; Lee 19'; Trotter 29'; Threlkeld (yellow card) 53'; Beckford (yellow card) 57'	Attendance: 23,070; Referee: A. Davies

3 May 2014 46	Ipswich Town	2–1	Sheffield Wednesday	Portman Road
12:15	Smith 37' (yellow card) 60'; Green 67'	Report	Onyewu (yellow card) 36'; Lee 55'	Attendance: 20,862; Referee: C. Boyeson

Last updated: 3 May 2014
Note: Championship fixtures not listed due to copyright.

=== Football League Cup ===
6 August 2013	Rotherham United	2–1	Sheffield Wednesday	New York Stadium
20:00	Pringle 10'; Agard (yellow card) 22'; Frecklington 38'; Skarz (yellow card) 43'; Tubbs (yellow card) 77'	Report	McCabe 23'; Hélan (yellow card) 57'; J. Johnson (red card) 78'; Antonio (yellow card) 88'	Attendance: 11,433

=== FA Cup ===
4 January 2014 Round 3	Macclesfield Town	1–1	Sheffield Wednesday	Moss Rose
15:00	Williams 72'	Report	Réda Johnson 25' (yellow card) 83'; Maguire (yellow card) 84'	Attendance: 5,873

14 January 2014 Round 3 Replay	Sheffield Wednesday	4–1	Macclesfield Town	Hillsborough Stadium
19:45	Maguire 3'; Maghoma 78'; J. Johnson 85'; Llera 90+1'	Report	Boden 65' (pen.)	Attendance: 12,302; Referee: N. Miller

25 January 2014 Round 4	Rochdale	1–2	Sheffield Wednesday	Spotland Stadium
15:00	Eastham (yellow card) 6'; Lund (yellow card) 20'; Rose 60' (yellow card) 85'	Report	Mattock 51' (yellow card) 31' (red card) 64'; Onyewu 57'; Semedo (yellow card) 55'	Attendance: 8,240; Referee: S. Hooper

15 February 2014 Round 5	Sheffield Wednesday	P–P	Charlton Athletic	Hillsborough Stadium
15:00		Report		Attendance: N/A; Referee: M. Clattenburg
Note: Postponed due to waterlogged pitch

24 February 2014 Round 5	Sheffield Wednesday	1–2	Charlton Athletic	Hillsborough Stadium
19:45	Best 57' (yellow card) 62'; Llera (yellow card) 64'; Loovens (yellow card) 67'; Mattock (yellow card) 77'	Report	Harriott 22'; Church 65'; Wood (yellow card) 88'	Attendance: 24,607; Referee: M. Clattenburg

== Squad statistics ==
=== Appearances and goals ===
As of 3 May 2014

No.	Pos	Nat	Player	Total		Championship		FA Cup		League Cup	
No.	Pos	Nat	Player	Apps	Goals	Apps	Goals	Apps	Goals	Apps	Goals
1	GK	(England) ENG	Chris Kirkland	36	0	35+0	0	0+0	0	1+0	0
2	DF	(England) ENG	Lewis Buxton	20	3	20+0	3	0+0	0	0+0	0
3	DF	(Benin) BEN	Réda Johnson	21	3	17+2	2	2+0	1	0+0	0
4	DF	(England) ENG	Anthony Gardner	6	0	5+0	0	0+0	0	1+0	0
5	DF	(Guinea) GUI	Kamil Zayatte	12	2	11+0	2	0+0	0	1+0	0
6	MF	(Portugal) POR	José Semedo	25	0	17+5	0	3+0	0	0+0	0
7	MF	(England) ENG	Michail Antonio	28	4	24+3	4	0+0	0	1+0	0
8	DF	(United States) USA	Oguchi Onyewu	19	1	18+0	0	1+0	1	0+0	0
10	MF	(Democratic Republic of the Congo) COD	Jacques Maghoma	30	3	18+7	2	3+1	1	1+0	0
11	MF	(Jamaica) JAM	Jermaine Johnson	31	1	5+22	0	0+3	1	0+1	0
13	GK	(England) ENG	Adam Davies	0	0	0+0	0	0+0	0	0+0	0
14	MF	(England) ENG	Giles Coke	30	1	20+8	1	1+1	0	0+0	0
15	DF	(England) ENG	Martin Taylor	0	0	0+0	0	0+0	0	0+0	0
16	MF	(Scotland) SCO	Rhys McCabe	10	1	2+5	0	0+2	0	1+0	1
17	MF	(France) FRA	Jérémy Hélan	48	2	33+10	2	2+2	0	1+0	0
18	FW	(Scotland) SCO	Chris Maguire	32	10	23+4	9	4+0	1	0+1	0
19	DF	(England) ENG	Joe Mattock	26	3	20+3	2	2+1	1	0+0	0
20	DF	(England) ENG	Kieran Lee	29	1	26+0	1	3+0	0	0+0	0
21	MF	(Republic of Ireland) IRL	Paul Corry	1	0	0+1	0	0+0	0	0+0	0
22	MF	(Scotland) SCO	Liam Palmer	44	0	33+6	0	4+0	0	1+0	0
24	DF	(Portugal) POR	Rafael Floro	2	0	1+0	0	0+0	0	1+0	0
25	FW	(Northern Ireland) NIR	Caolan Lavery	23	4	9+12	4	1+1	0	0+0	0
26	GK	(Argentina) ARG	Emiliano Martínez	15	0	11+0	0	4+0	0	0+0	0
28	FW	(England) ENG	Benik Afobe	13	2	4+8	2	1+0	0	0+0	0
32	DF	(Spain) ESP	Miguel Llera	25	1	18+4	0	3+0	1	0+0	0
33	FW	(Switzerland) SUI	Anđelko Savić	1	0	0+1	0	0+0	0	0+0	0
34	FW	(Austria) AUT	Atdhe Nuhiu	43	8	25+13	8	3+1	0	1+0	0
35	DF	(England) ENG	Adedeji Oshilaja	2	0	2+0	0	0+0	0	0+0	0
36	DF	(Netherlands) NED	Glenn Loovens	26	0	21+1	0	4+0	0	0+0	0
37	FW	(France) FRA	Franck Betra	0	0	0+0	0	0+0	0	0+0	0
38	DF	(England) ENG	Taylor McKenzie	0	0	0+0	0	0+0	0	0+0	0
39	MF	(England) ENG	Jack Stobbs	1	0	0+1	0	0+0	0	0+0	0
41	DF	(England) ENG	Sam Hutchinson	10	1	8+2	1	0+0	0	0+0	0
42	FW	(Republic of Ireland) IRL	Leon Best	16	6	12+3	5	1+0	1	0+0	0
Players for Sheffield Wednesday who are currently out on loan:
9	FW	(England) ENG	Gary Madine	2	0	0+1	0	0+0	0	0+1	0
12	MF	(England) ENG	David Prutton	10	1	7+2	1	0+0	0	1+0	0
23	MF	(England) ENG	Danny Mayor	0	0	0+0	0	0+0	0	0+0	0
30	GK	(England) ENG	Arron Jameson	0	0	0+0	0	0+0	0	0+0	0
31	GK	(England) ENG	Cameron Dawson	0	0	0+0	0	0+0	0	0+0	0
Sheffield Wednesday players from this season that are no longer at the club:
8	DF	(England) ENG	Roger Johnson	17	0	17+0	0	0+0	0	0+0	0
26	DF	(England) ENG	Jordan Spence	4	0	4+0	0	0+0	0	0+0	0
27	MF	(Republic of Ireland) IRL	Stephen McPhail	14	0	13+0	0	1+0	0	0+0	0
28	FW	(England) ENG	Matty Fryatt	9	4	7+2	4	0+0	0	0+0	0
29	FW	(England) ENG	Connor Wickham	11	8	11+0	8	0+0	0	0+0	0
35	MF	(Nigeria) NGR	Seyi Olofinjana	6	0	5+1	0	0+0	0	0+0	0
40	MF	(England) ENG	Gary Gardner	4	0	3+0	0	1+0	0	0+0	0

=== Top Goal Scorers ===
As of 3 May 2014

Place	Position	Nation	Number	Name	Championship	FA Cup	League Cup	Total
1	FW	(Scotland)	18	Chris Maguire	9	1	0	10
2	FW	(Albania)	34	Atdhe Nuhiu	8	0	0	8
=	FW	(England)	29	Connor Wickham	8	0	0	8
4	FW	(Republic of Ireland)	42	Leon Best	4	1	0	5
5	MF	(England)	7	Michail Antonio	4	0	0	4
=	FW	(England)	28	Matty Fryatt	4	0	0	4
=	FW	(Northern Ireland)	25	Caolan Lavery	4	0	0	4
8	DF	(England)	2	Lewis Buxton	3	0	0	3
=	DF	(Benin)	3	Réda Johnson	2	1	0	3
=	MF	(Democratic Republic of the Congo)	10	Jacques Maghoma	2	1	0	3
=	DF	(England)	19	Joe Mattock	2	1	0	3
12	FW	(England)	28	Benik Afobe	2	0	0	2
=	MF	(France)	17	Jérémy Hélan	2	0	0	2
=	DF	(Guinea)	5	Kamil Zayatte	2	0	0	2
15	MF	(England)	14	Giles Coke	1	0	0	1
=	DF	(England)	41	Sam Hutchinson	1	0	0	1
=	MF	(Jamaica)	11	Jermaine Johnson	0	1	0	1
=	MF	(England)	20	Kieran Lee	1	0	0	1
=	DF	(Spain)	32	Miguel Llera	0	1	0	1
=	MF	(Scotland)	16	Rhys McCabe	0	0	1	1
=	DF	(United States)	8	Oguchi Onyewu	0	1	0	1
=	MF	(England)	12	David Prutton	1	0	0	1
				Totals	60	8	1	69

=== Disciplinary record ===
As of 3 May 2014

Place	No.	Nation	Position	Name	Championship		FA Cup		League Cup		Total	
Place	No.	Nation	Position	Name	Yellow card	Red card	Yellow card	Red card	Yellow card	Red card	Yellow card	Red card
1	41	(England)	DF	Sam Hutchinson	4	2	0	0	0	0	4	2
2	11	(Jamaica)	MF	Jermaine Johnson	3	1	0	0	0	1	3	2
3	6	(Portugal)	MF	José Semedo	4	1	1	0	0	0	5	1
4	19	(England)	DF	Joe Mattock	3	0	1	1	0	0	4	1
5	14	(England)	MF	Giles Coke	0	1	0	0	0	0	0	1
6	32	(Spain)	DF	Miguel Llera	8	0	1	0	0	0	9	0
7	17	(France)	MF	Jérémy Hélan	7	0	0	0	1	0	8	0
=	18	(Scotland)	FW	Chris Maguire	7	0	1	0	0	0	8	0
9	34	(Austria)	FW	Atdhe Nuhiu	7	0	0	0	0	0	7	0
10	3	(Benin)	DF	Réda Johnson	5	0	1	0	0	0	6	0
=	22	(Scotland)	MF	Liam Palmer	6	0	0	0	0	0	6	0
12	20	(England)	MF	Kieran Lee	4	0	0	0	0	0	4	0
=	36	(Netherlands)	DF	Glenn Loovens	3	0	1	0	0	0	4	0
=	27	(Republic of Ireland)	MF	Stephen McPhail	4	0	0	0	0	0	4	0
15	2	(England)	MF	Lewis Buxton	3	0	0	0	0	0	3	0
=	10	(Democratic Republic of the Congo)	MF	Jacques Maghoma	3	0	0	0	0	0	3	0
17	7	(England)	MF	Michail Antonio	1	0	0	0	1	0	2	0
=	40	(England)	MF	Gary Gardner	2	0	0	0	0	0	2	0
=	8	(England)	DF	Roger Johnson	2	0	0	0	0	0	2	0
=	8	(United States)	DF	Oguchi Onyewu	2	0	0	0	0	0	2	0
=	12	(England)	MF	David Prutton	2	0	0	0	0	0	2	0
=	29	(England)	FW	Connor Wickham	2	0	0	0	0	0	2	0
23	28	(England)	FW	Benik Afobe	1	0	0	0	0	0	1	0
=	42	(Republic of Ireland)	FW	Leon Best	0	0	1	0	0	0	1	0
=	4	(England)	DF	Anthony Gardner	1	0	0	0	0	0	1	0
=	1	(England)	GK	Chris Kirkland	1	0	0	0	0	0	1	0
=	25	(Northern Ireland)	FW	Caolan Lavery	1	0	0	0	0	0	1	0
=	16	(Scotland)	MF	Rhys McCabe	1	0	0	0	0	0	1	0
=	35	(Nigeria)	MF	Seyi Olofinjana	1	0	0	0	0	0	1	0
=	26	(England)	DF	Jordan Spence	1	0	0	0	0	0	1	0
=	5	(Guinea)	DF	Kamil Zayatte	1	0	0	0	0	0	1	0
				Totals	90	5	7	1	2	1	99	7

== Competitions ==
=== Overall ===
Competition	Started round	Current Pos/Round	Final Pos/Round	First match	Last match
Championship	N/A	16th	16th	3 August 2013	3 May 2014
FA Cup	Round 3	Round 5	Round 5	4 January 2014	24 February 2014
League Cup	Round 1	Round 1	Round 1	6 August 2013	6 August 2013

=== Championship ===
==== Classification ====
Pos	Team	Pld	W	D	L	GF	GA	GD	Pts
14	Bolton Wanderers	46	14	17	15	59	60	−1	59
15	Leeds United	46	16	9	21	59	67	−8	57
16	Sheffield Wednesday	46	13	14	19	63	65	−2	53
17	Huddersfield Town	46	14	11	21	58	65	−7	53
18	Charlton Athletic	46	13	12	21	41	61	−20	51

Source: BBC Sport
Rules for classification: 1) points; 2) goal difference; 3) number of goals scored

==== Results summary ====
Overall								Home						Away					
Pld	W	D	L	GF	GA	GD	Pts	W	D	L	GF	GA	GD	W	D	L	GF	GA	GD
46	13	14	19	63	66	−3	53	9	4	10	39	34	+5	4	10	9	24	32	−8

Last updated: 3 May 2014.
Source: Championship

==== Results by round ====
Round	1	2	3	4	5	6	7	8	9	10	11	12	13	14	15	16	17	18	19	20	21	22	23	24	25	26	27	28	29	30	31	32	33	34	35	36	37	38	39	40	41	42	43	44	45	46
Ground	A	H	A	H	A	H	A	H	A	H	A	A	H	A	H	A	H	H	A	H	A	A	H	H	A	A	H	A	H	H	A	H	A	A	H	H	A	H	H	A	A	H	A	H	H	A
Result	L	L	D	D	D	D	L	L	D	D	D	D	W	L	L	L	W	L	W	L	D	D	W	W	D	D	W	W	L	L	W	W	L	L	W	W	L	W	L	L	D	D	W	L	L	L
Position	19	20	21	20	21	19	21	22	21	22	23	24	21	22	22	23	23	23	22	22	22	22	20	19	19	20	17	17	17	17	15	15	16	17	16	14	15	13	14	14	15	15	15	15	16	16

Updated to match(es) played on 3 May 2014. Source: BBC Sport
A = Away; H = Home; W = Win; D = Draw; L = Loss

== Awards ==
=== PFA Player in the Community Award ===
Winner	Club	Ref
(Benin) Réda Johnson	Sheffield Wednesday	

=== Wise Old Owls Award ===
Pos	Nat	Player	Ref
1	(Scotland)	Liam Palmer	

=== Sheffield Wednesday Community Champion ===
Place	#	Pos	Nat	Player	Ref
1st	3	DF	(Benin)	Réda Johnson	

=== Sheffield Wednesday Academy Player of the Year ===
Place	#	Pos	Nat	Player	Ref
1st	—	GK	(England)	Joe Wildsmith	

=== The IV Northern Programme Club Merit Award ===
Winner	Programme Name	Ref
Sheffield Wednesday	Wednesday	

=== The Football League Family Excellence Award ===
Club	Ref
Sheffield Wednesday	

=== Student Employer of the Year ===
Winner	Ref
Sheffield Wednesday	

=== LMA Performance of the Week ===
Winner	Match	Ground	Date	Ref
Sheffield Wednesday	Sheffield Wednesday 5–2 Reading	Hillsborough Stadium	7 November 2013	
Sheffield Wednesday	Sheffield Wednesday 6–0 Leeds United	Hillsborough Stadium	11 January 2014	

=== Sky Bet Football League Team of the Week ===
Week	Player(s)	Ref
3–9 Feb	(Scotland) Chris Maguire	
7–13 Apr	(England) Lewis Buxton	

=== The 72 Championship Team of the Week ===
Week	Player(s)	Ref
14 Dec	(Netherlands) Glenn Loovens	
11 Jan	(Benin) Réda Johnson, (England) Kieran Lee, (Portugal) José Semedo	
1 Feb	(Scotland) Chris Maguire	
8 Feb	(Spain) Miguel Llera	
22 Feb	(England) Sam Hutchinson, (France) Jérémy Hélan	
1 Mar	(Netherlands) Glenn Loovens	
15 Mar	(Northern Ireland) Caolan Lavery	

=== League Football Education Goal of the Month ===
Month	Player	Versus	Ref
February	(England) Jack Stobbs	Chelsea U-18	
