= Pedro Baquero =

Spanish footballer

Personal information
- Full name: Pedro Jesús López Baquero
- Date of birth: 2 October 1980 (age 46)
- Place of birth: Huelva, Spain
- Height: 1.83 m (6 ft 0 in)
- Position: Centre back

Senior career*
Years	Team	Apps	(Gls)
2000–2003	Recreativo B		
2003	→ Gimnàstic (loan)	25	(0)
2003–2006	Recreativo	34	(0)
2006–2008	Rayo Vallecano	62	(2)
2008–2009	Lorca Deportiva	33	(0)
2009–2010	Pontevedra	25	(0)
2010–2012	Cádiz	56	(3)
2012–2013	Oviedo	29	(1)
2013–2014	Doxa	28	(0)
2014–2015	Lleida Esportiu	34	(0)
2015–2017	San Roque	58	(2)
2017–2018	Villarrobledo	36	(2)
Total		420	(10)
- * Club domestic league appearances and goals

Pedro Jesús López Baquero (born 2 October 1980 in Huelva, Andalusia) is a Spanish retired footballer who played as a central defender.

== Club statistics ==
As of 13 November 2015

Club	Season	League			Cup		Other		Total	
Club	Season	Division	Apps	Goals	Apps	Goals	Apps	Goals	Apps	Goals
Gimnàstic	2002–03	Segunda División B	25	1	—		—		29	10
Recreativo	2003–04	Segunda División	3	0	0	0	—		3	0
Recreativo	2004–05	Segunda División	18	0	4	0	—		22	0
Recreativo	2005–06	Segunda División	13	0	1	0	—		14	0
Recreativo	Total		34	0	5	0	—		39	0
Rayo Vallecano	2006–07	Segunda División B	36	2	2	0	4 (Note: Appearances in Promotion Play-offs)	0	42	2
Rayo Vallecano	2007–08	Segunda División B	26	0	1	0	1	0	28	0
Rayo Vallecano	Total		62	2	3	0	5	0	70	2
Lorca Deportiva	2008–09	Segunda División B	33	0	0	0	4	0	37	0
Pontevedra	2009–10	Segunda División B	25	0	0	0	2	0	27	0
Cádiz	2010–11	Segunda División B	26	1	1	0	2	0	29	1
Cádiz	2011–12	Segunda División B	30	2	3	0	3	0	36	2
Cádiz	Total		56	3	4	0	5	0	65	3
Oviedo	2012–13	Segunda División B	29	1	2	0	4	0	35	1
Doxa	2013–14	Cypriot First Division	28	0	3	0	—		31	0
Lleida	2014–15	Segunda División B	34	0	2	0	—		36	0
San Roque	2015–16	Segunda División B	5	0	0	0	—		5	0
Career total			331	7	19	0	20	0	370	7

== Honours ==
Recreativo

- Segunda División: 2005–06

Rayo Vallecano

- Segunda División B: 2007–08

Cádiz

- Segunda División B: 2011–12
