= Atlético Onubense =

Spanish football club

- Full name: Atlético Onubense
- Nicknames: Recre, El Decano (The Dean)
- Founded: 1960
- Ground: Ciudad Deportiva, Huelva, Andalusia, Spain
- Capacity: 1,300
- President: José Miguel de la Corte
- Head coach: Antonio Calle
- League: Tercera Federación – Group 10
- 2025–26: Tercera Federación – Group 10, 14th of 18
| Home colours | Away colours |

Atlético Onubense, is a Spanish football team based in Huelva, in the autonomous community of Andalusia. Founded in 1960, it is the reserve team of Recreativo de Huelva, and currently plays in the Tercera Federación – Group 10, holding home games at Ciudad Deportiva Recreativo de Huelva, with a 1,300-seat capacity.

== Season to season ==
- As a farm team

| Season | Tier | Division | Place | Copa del Rey |
|---|---|---|---|---|
| 1960–1963 | — | Regional | — | |
| 1963–64 | 4 | 1ª Reg. | 2nd | |
| 1964–65 | 3 | 3ª | 7th | |
| 1965–66 | 3 | 3ª | 5th | |
| 1966–67 | 3 | 3ª | 6th | |
| 1967–68 | 3 | 3ª | 16th | |
| 1968–69 | DNP | | | |
| 1969–70 | DNP | | | |
| 1970–71 | DNP | | | |
| 1971–72 | 5 | 2ª Reg. | 2nd | |
| 1972–73 | 4 | 1ª Reg. | 16th | |
| 1973–74 | 5 | 2ª Reg. | 10th | |
| 1974–75 | 5 | 2ª Reg. | 11th | |
| 1975–76 | 6 | 2ª Reg. | 4th | |
| 1976–77 | 6 | 2ª Reg. | 1st | |

| Season | Tier | Division | Place | Copa del Rey |
|---|---|---|---|---|
| 1977–78 | 6 | 1ª Reg. | 13th | |
| 1978–79 | 6 | 1ª Reg. | 3rd | |
| 1979–80 | 6 | 1ª Reg. | 6th | |
| 1980–81 | 5 | Reg. Pref. | 14th | |
| 1981–82 | 5 | Reg. Pref. | 16th | |
| 1982–83 | 5 | Reg. Pref. | 4th | |
| 1983–84 | 4 | 3ª | 10th | |
| 1984–85 | 4 | 3ª | 15th | |
| 1985–86 | 5 | Reg. Pref. | 10th | |
| 1986–87 | 5 | Reg. Pref. | 12th | |
| 1987–88 | 5 | Reg. Pref. | 5th | |
| 1988–89 | 5 | Reg. Pref. | 14th | |
| 1989–90 | 5 | Reg. Pref. | 5th | |
| 1990–91 | 5 | Reg. Pref. | 1st | |

- As a reserve team

| Season | Tier | Division | Place |
|---|---|---|---|
| 1991–92 | 5 | Reg. Pref. | 6th |
| 1992–93 | 5 | Reg. Pref. | 3rd |
| 1993–94 | 5 | Reg. Pref. | 9th |
| 1994–95 | 5 | Reg. Pref. | 6th |
| 1995–96 | 5 | Reg. Pref. | 4th |
| 1996–97 | 5 | Reg. Pref. | 2nd |
| 1997–98 | 5 | Reg. Pref. | 4th |
| 1998–99 | 5 | Reg. Pref. | 2nd |
| 1999–2000 | 4 | 3ª | 8th |
| 2000–01 | 4 | 3ª | 7th |
| 2001–02 | 4 | 3ª | 4th |
| 2002–03 | 4 | 3ª | 19th |
| 2003–04 | 5 | Reg. Pref. | 3rd |
| 2004–05 | 5 | 1ª And. | 6th |
| 2005–06 | 5 | 1ª And. | 5th |
| 2006–07 | 5 | 1ª And. | 4th |
| 2007–08 | 5 | 1ª And. | 1st |
| 2008–09 | 4 | 3ª | 11th |
| 2009–10 | 4 | 3ª | 8th |
| 2010–11 | 4 | 3ª | 13th |

| Season | Tier | Division | Place |
|---|---|---|---|
| 2011–12 | 4 | 3ª | 8th |
| 2012–13 | 4 | 3ª | 9th |
| 2013–14 | 4 | 3ª | 13th |
| 2014–15 | 4 | 3ª | 20th |
| 2015–16 | 5 | 1ª And. | 1st |
| 2016–17 | 4 | 3ª | 15th |
| 2017–18 | 4 | 3ª | 18th |
| 2018–19 | 5 | Div. Hon. | 5th |
| 2019–20 | 5 | Div. Hon. | 4th |
| 2020–21 | 5 | Div. Hon. | 6th |
| 2021–22 | 6 | Div. Hon. | 19th |
| 2022–23 | 7 | 1ª And. | 2nd |
| 2023–24 | 6 | Div. Hon. | 1st |
| 2024–25 | 5 | 3ª Fed. | 8th |
| 2025–26 | 5 | 3ª Fed. | 14th |
| 2026–27 | 5 | 3ª Fed. | |

- 19 seasons in Tercera División
- 3 seasons in Tercera Federación

== Former players ==
- (Nigeria) Elvis Onyema
- (Spain) Pedro Baquero
- (Spain) Cheli
- (Spain) Fidel
- (Spain) Joselito
- (Spain) Miguel Llera
- (Spain) Pablo Oliveira
- (Spain) Juan Villar
- (Spain) Chuli
- (Vietnam) Đỗ Hoàng Hên
