= Anđelko Savić =

Swiss footballer (born 1993)

Personal information
- Date of birth: 11 March 1993 (age 33)
- Place of birth: Lausanne, Switzerland
- Height: 1.88 m (6 ft 2 in)
- Position: Forward

Team information
- Current team: Bavois
- Number: 17

Youth career
- 2010–2011: Basel
- 2011–2012: Sampdoria

Senior career*
| Years | Team | Apps | (Gls) |
| 2012–2015 | Sampdoria | 1 | (0) |
| 2013–2014 | → Sheffield Wednesday (loan) | 1 | (0) |
| 2014–2015 | → Lausanne Sport (loan) | 20 | (3) |
| 2015–2016 | Neuchâtel Xamax | 20 | (5) |
| 2016–2017 | Le Mont | 19 | (2) |
| 2017–2019 | Wil | 42 | (5) |
| 2019– | Bavois | 2 | (0) |

International career
| 2007–2008 | Switzerland U15 | 10 | (3) |
| 2009–2010 | Switzerland U16 | 8 | (6) |
| 2009–2011 | Switzerland U17 | 8 | (2) |
| 2011 | Switzerland U18 | 3 | (0) |
| 2011–2012 | Switzerland U19 | 5 | (0) |
| 2013 | Switzerland U21 | 1 | (0) |
| 2014 | Switzerland U20 | 1 | (0) |
- * Club domestic league appearances and goals as of 22:41, 8 August 2019 (UTC)

Anđelko Savić (Serbian Cyrillic: Анђелко Савић; born 11 March 1993) is a Swiss professional footballer who plays for FC Bavois as a forward in the Swiss Promotion League.

== Club career ==
In 2011, he joined Sampdoria from Basel. He also holds Serbian passport. He made his debut against Siena.

On 23 August 2013, Savić signed a loan deal with buying option with Sheffield Wednesday. On 21 December 2013, he made his debut as a 66th-minute substitute in a 2-1 home loss to AFC Bournemouth.

Savić signed a season long loan deal with Swiss Challenge League side Lausanne Sport on 2 July 2014. He made his debut as a second-half substitute in the season opener against FC Lugano on 19 July.

On 25 June 2015, he joined Swiss Challenge League side Neuchâtel Xamax on a free transfer.

Ahead of the 2019/20 season, Savić joined Swiss Promotion League club FC Bavois.

== International career ==
He is capped at various youth levels for Switzerland, ranging from U15 to U21.

== Career statistics ==
=== Club ===
As of 13 February 2014

| Club | Season | League | | | Cup | | Europe | | Other | | Total | |
| Club | Season | Division | Apps | Goals | Apps | Goals | Apps | Goals | Apps | Goals | Apps | Goals |
|---|---|---|---|---|---|---|---|---|---|---|---|---|
| Sampdoria | 2012-13 | Serie A | 1 | 0 | 0 | 0 | 0 | 0 | 0 | 0 | 1 | 0 |
| Sheffield Wednesday | 2013-14 | Championship | 1 | 0 | 0 | 0 | 0 | 0 | 0 | 0 | 1 | 0 |
| Career total | | | 2 | 0 | 0 | 0 | 0 | 0 | 0 | 0 | 2 | 0 |

== Honours ==
Individual

- Swiss Cup Top goalacorers: 2016–17
