= Puebla de Guzmán =

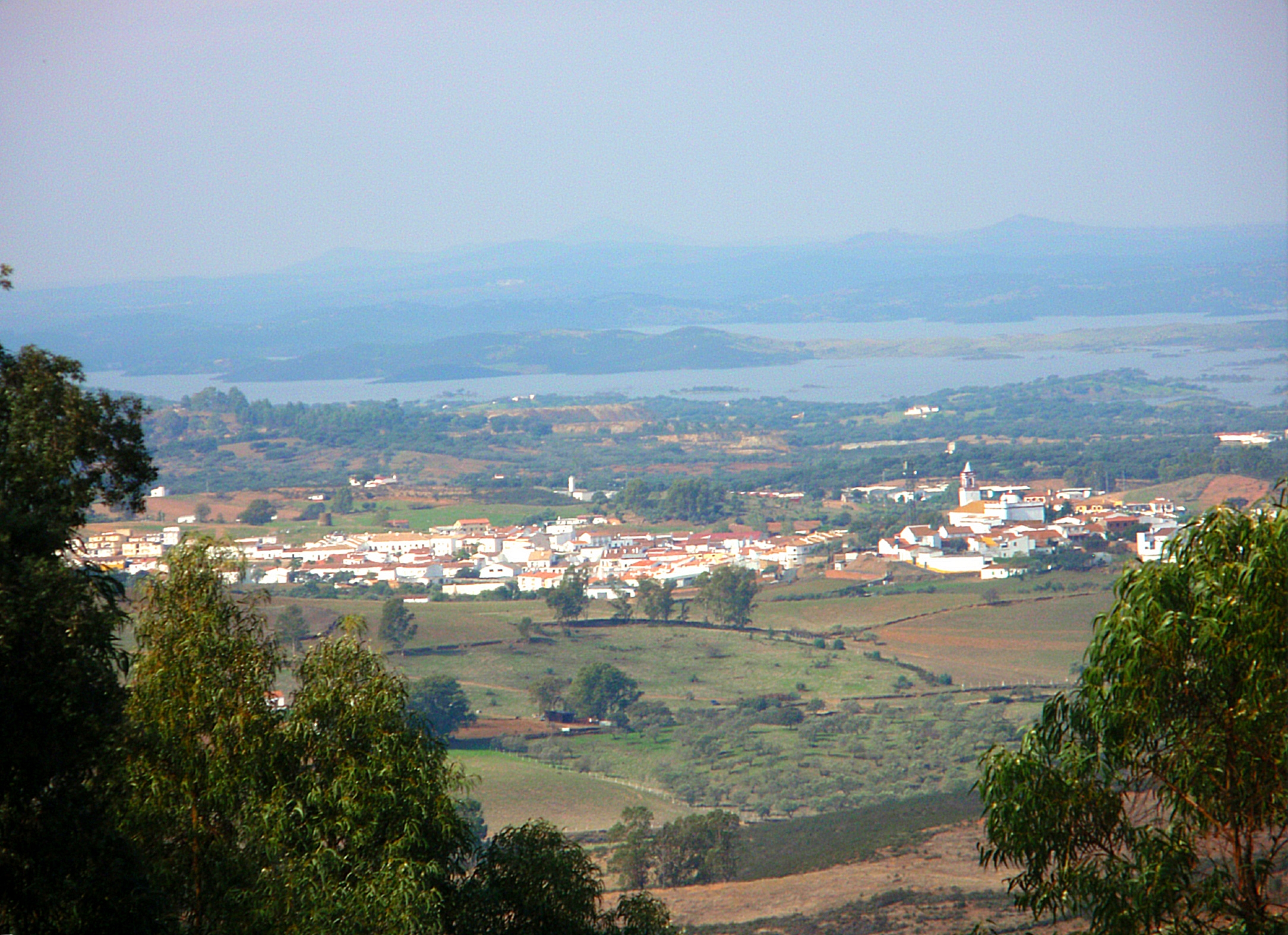

- Flag Coat of arms

- Location of Puebla de Guzmán in Spain
- Coordinates: 37°37′N 7°15′W
- Country: Spain
- Autonomous community: Andalusia
- Province: Huelva

Area
  - Total: 337 km^{2} (130 sq mi)
- Elevation: 214 m (702 ft)

Population (2025-01-01)
  - Total: 3,071
  - Density: 9.11/km^{2} (23.6/sq mi)
- Time zone: UTC+1 (CET)
  - Summer (DST): UTC+2 (CEST)
- Website: https://www.puebladeguzman.es/

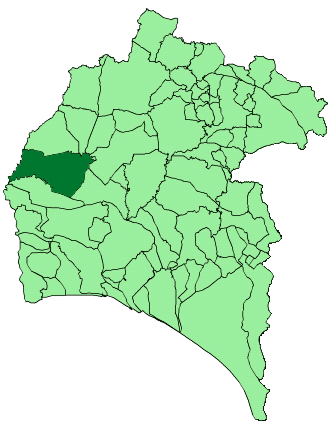
Map of Puebla de Guzmán, Huelva

Puebla de Guzmán is a town and a municipality located in the province of Huelva, Spain. According to the 2025 municipal register, it has a population of 3,071 inhabitants.

== Notable people ==
- Pablo Oliveira, footballer

== See also ==
- List of municipalities in Huelva
