= Cheli (footballer) =

Spanish footballer

Personal information
- Full name: José Manuel González Ortiz
- Date of birth: 29 January 1979 (age 47)
- Place of birth: Lepe, Spain
- Height: 1.75 m (5 ft 9 in)
- Position: Midfielder

Youth career
- Recreativo

Senior career*
Years	Team	Apps	(Gls)
1997–2000	Recreativo B		
1998	→ Isla Cristina (loan)	9	(0)
1999	→ San Roque (loan)		
2000–2007	Recreativo	77	(7)
2002–2003	→ Jaén (loan)	19	(0)
2003–2004	→ Badajoz (loan)	35	(3)
2007–2009	Málaga	36	(2)
2009–2010	Lleida	30	(3)
2010–2011	San Roque	37	(3)
- * Club domestic league appearances and goals

José Manuel González Ortiz (born 29 January 1979), known as Cheli, is a Spanish retired footballer who played as a midfielder.

== Football career ==
Cheli was born in Lepe, Province of Huelva. After emerging through the ranks of local Recreativo de Huelva he played eight seasons with the first team, experiencing two La Liga promotions with the Andalusians; he was also loaned twice, on both occasions to third division sides.

In 2006–07, Cheli made his top level debuts, his first appearance being in a 1–1 home draw against RCD Mallorca on 27 August 2006. Scarcely used throughout the campaign he still scored two goals, in large wins over Galicia's Celta de Vigo (4–2) and Deportivo de La Coruña (5–2).

Cheli joined Recreativo neighbours Málaga CF for 2007–08, appearing regularly – both as starter or from the bench – to help the club return to the top flight. In the following season, however, he was very rarely played, being released at its closure and joining UE Lleida in division three.
