= Elvis Onyema =

Nigerian footballer

Personal information
- Full name: Elvis Onyema Ogude
- Date of birth: 21 September 1986 (age 40)
- Place of birth: Abeokuta, Nigeria
- Height: 1.86 m (6 ft 1 in)
- Positions: Winger; striker

Youth career
- NEPA Lagos

Senior career*
Years	Team	Apps	(Gls)
2005–2007	Poli Ejido B	52	(17)
2007–2008	Bellinzona	19	(1)
2008	Granada 74	20	(1)
2008–2009	Ceuta	37	(19)
2009–2010	Barcelona B	28	(7)
2010	Recreativo B	0	(0)
2011	Leganés	6	(0)
2011–2012	Racing de Ferrol	0	(0)
2012	Ceuta	14	(0)
2014–2015	Unión Adarve		
2016	Motril		
2016–2017	Segorbe		
- * Club domestic league appearances and goals

Elvis Onyema Ogude (born 21 September 1986, in Abeokuta) is a former Nigerian footballer, who plays as a winger or striker.
