= Pablo Oliveira =

Spanish footballer

Personal information
- Full name: Pablo Oliveira Serrano
- Date of birth: 8 March 1987 (age 39)
- Place of birth: Puebla de Guzmán, Spain
- Height: 1.82 m (5 ft 11 1/2 in)
- Position: Right back

Team information
- Current team: Aroche

Youth career
- Recreativo

Senior career*
Years	Team	Apps	(Gls)
2006–2011	Recreativo B	73	(6)
2007–2012	Recreativo	7	(0)
2009	→ Ponferradina (loan)	2	(0)
2010	→ San Roque (loan)	10	(0)
2012	San Roque	8	(0)
2012–2014	Ayamonte	49	(3)
2014–2015	Olímpica Valverdeña	30	(1)
2015–2016	San Roque	24	(0)
2016–2017	Cartaya	32	(0)
2017–2019	Olímpica Valverdeña	63	(5)
2019–	Aroche	2	(0)
- * Club domestic league appearances and goals as of 8 September 2019

Pablo Oliveira Serrano (born 8 March 1987) is a Spanish professional footballer who plays for Aroche CF as a right back.

== Club career ==
Oliveira was born in Puebla de Guzmán, Province of Huelva. A product of local Recreativo de Huelva's youth academy, he made his first-team debut on 10 June 2007 in 2006–07's penultimate round in La Liga, appearing as a late substitute in a 5–2 away win against Deportivo de La Coruña. He would spend, however, his first three senior seasons almost entirely with the reserves, amassing only seven top-flight appearances.

For 2009–10, Oliveira was loaned to SD Ponferradina of the third division. He completed the campaign at CD San Roque de Lepe in the same level, and would join the same club midway through 2011–12 after cutting all ties with Recreativo.
