= Joselito (footballer, born 1985) =

Spanish footballer

Personal information
- Full name: José Romero Jiménez
- Date of birth: 23 January 1985 (age 41)
- Place of birth: Zalamea la Real, Spain
- Height: 1.82 m (5 ft 11 1/2 in)
- Position: Forward

Youth career
- Zalamea
- Recreativo

Senior career*
Years	Team	Apps	(Gls)
2003–2005	Recreativo B		
2005–2009	Recreativo	3	(0)
2006	→ Racing Ferrol (loan)	18	(2)
2006–2007	→ Jaén (loan)	19	(1)
2007	→ Cultural Leonesa (loan)	3	(0)
2008	→ Castelldefels (loan)	14	(1)
2009–2013	Guijuelo	113	(18)
2013	La Roda	11	(0)
2014	Arroyo	13	(0)
2015	Olímpica Valverdeña	3	(0)
2015–2016	Guijuelo	12	(0)
2016–2017	Olímpica Valverdeña	16	(0)
2017–2019	Zalamea	12	(4)
2019–2020	Riotinto	19	(4)
2020–2021	Zalamea	14	(5)
2022–2023	Riotinto	9	(2)
Total		279	(37)
- * Club domestic league appearances and goals

José Romero Jiménez (born 23 January 1985), known as Joselito, is a Spanish former footballer who played as a forward.

== Club career ==
Born in Zalamea la Real, Province of Huelva, Joselito all but spent his career in the Spanish lower leagues. In the 2008–09 season he appeared in four competitive matches with local club Recreativo de Huelva as a substitute, playing in La Liga in the 1–0 away win against Real Betis and the 0–1 home loss to RCD Espanyol.

Joselito was loaned to Segunda División side Racing de Ferrol on 2 January 2006. He scored on his debut thirteen days later, closing a 3–3 draw at Real Valladolid.
