= Miguel Llera =

Spanish footballer and manager

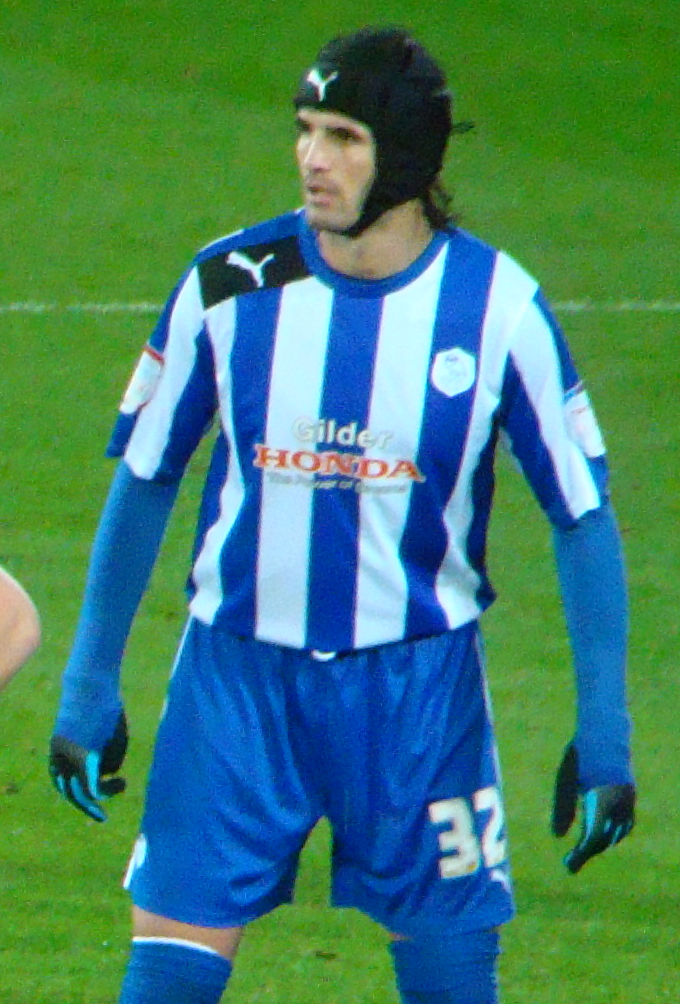
- Llera playing for Sheffield Wednesday in 2012

Personal information
- Full name: Miguel Ángel Llera Garzón
- Date of birth: 7 August 1979 (age 47)
- Place of birth: Castilleja de la Cuesta, Spain
- Height: 1.93 m (6 ft 4 in)
- Position: Centre back

Youth career
- Recreativo

Senior career*
Years	Team	Apps	(Gls)
1998–2001	Recreativo B		
2000–2001	→ San Fernando (loan)	19	(0)
2001–2005	Alicante	102	(4)
2005–2007	Gimnàstic	39	(5)
2007–2008	Hércules	11	(1)
2008–2009	Milton Keynes Dons	36	(2)
2009–2011	Charlton Athletic	41	(6)
2011–2012	Blackpool	0	(0)
2011	→ Brentford (loan)	11	(0)
2011–2012	→ Sheffield Wednesday (loan)	4	(0)
2012–2014	Sheffield Wednesday	79	(10)
2014–2015	Scunthorpe United	15	(1)
Total		357	(29)
- * Club domestic league appearances and goals

Miguel Ángel Llera Garzón (born 7 August 1979) is a Spanish football manager and former professional player who played as a centre back. He was most recently first-team coach at Bristol Rovers.

He played mostly in the lower leagues of his country, appearing in only 12 La Liga games with Gimnàstic. He moved to England in 2008 after signing with Milton Keynes Dons, going on to remain in the country until his retirement and represent a host of clubs, mainly Sheffield Wednesday (three years) and Charlton Athletic (two).

== Playing career ==
=== Spain ===
Llera was born in Castilleja de la Cuesta, Province of Seville. After unsuccessfully emerging through local Recreativo de Huelva's youth ranks, he represented several modest clubs until 2005–06, when he contributed with 27 games (scoring three times) to Gimnàstic de Tarragona's return to La Liga after a 56-year absence; midway through the following season, however, he was released from contract after appearing in 12 matches (all starts) for the Catalans and scoring in defeats against Real Sociedad (2–3, away) and Getafe CF (1–3, home), as Nàstic were immediately relegated.

In 2007–08 Llera continued in Segunda División, but also failed to impress at Hércules CF, playing only 11 games out of a possible 42.

=== Milton Keynes Dons ===
Subsequently, Llera took his game to England, joining League One side Milton Keynes Dons in September 2008.

He scored twice during his spell with the Dons, against Carlisle United and Brighton & Hove Albion.

=== Charlton ===
After a successful season, with a third-place finish straight out of Football League Two, albeit without eventual promotion, Llera signed for Charlton Athletic on 2 July 2009, after turning down a new contract offer – he became the first Spanish footballer to play for the club.

Llera quickly established himself as a fans' favourite after just four matches, scoring on his debut against Wycombe Wanderers but also picking up a head injury which led him to wear a helmet for the next fixtures, similar to that of Chelsea's Petr Čech; he scored his first goal for the Addicks on 22 August 2009, in a 2–0 home win against Walsall.

=== Blackpool ===
After leaving Charlton at the end of the 2010–11 season, Llera spent some time training with Blackpool and joined them on trial, making his debut against Rangers on 19 July 2011. On 2 August, he scored from a free kick against Lancaster City in a 1–3 defeat, and, two days later, he signed a one-year contract with the option of a further year.

=== Brentford / S. Wednesday ===
On 7 September 2011, Llera transferred to Brentford on a three-month loan deal. On 22 November he moved to Sheffield Wednesday, in a loan agreement lasting until January 2012.

On 10 January 2012, Llera was signed on a permanent deal by Wednesday, having been released by Blackpool. On 11 February, in a game against Exeter City, he suffered a head injury in an eventual 1–2 away loss, going on to miss approximately one month of action.

=== Scunthorpe ===
After impressing on trial, on 21 July 2014 Llera was offered a contract by Oldham Athletic, which was later withdrawn. He eventually moved to League One's Scunthorpe United late in the month, agreeing to a one-year deal also after a trial period.

Llera made his competitive debut on 9 August 2014, in a 1–3 defeat at Swindon Town. His first appearance at Glanford Park took place the following weekend, and he scored a 39th minute own goal in 0–4 loss to Preston North End.

Llera netted his first and only goal for the Iron on 13 December 2014, contributing to a 2–1 home win over Crewe Alexandra. On 5 May of the following year, it was announced he would not be offered a new contract and was free to leave the club.

== Coaching career ==
=== S. Wednesday / Chesterfield ===
In July 2014, Llera began coaching the under-14 squad of Sheffield Wednesday. In summer 2015, he started working as a first-team scout.

In January 2016, Llera launched his own academy, Miguel Llera International Football Academy, occasionally sending young players for trials at Wednesday. In August 2017, he was appointed Professional Development Phase coach at Chesterfield.

On 11 January 2019, Llera left the Proact Stadium by mutual consent.

=== Sheffield FC / Hallam University ===
Starting in July 2015 and with the duration of one year, Llera was part of the staff at Sheffield FC, acting as assistant manager as well as being responsible for subjects concerning the academy. In September 2015, he became the club's scholarship football coach and also second and third team manager at Sheffield Hallam University; in addition, he held the same position at Meadowhead School Academy Trust.

Llera left all of these roles in September 2016.

=== Walsall ===
A qualified personal trainer who owned a master's degree in sport psychology and coaching, Llera subsequently worked as a primary and secondary physical education fitness coach. On 12 July 2019, he was hired as academy manager at Walsall.

On 14 January 2022, Llera left his role as Walsall academy manager.

=== Non-League coaching roles ===
In July 2023, Llera joined NCEFL Division One team Retford United as a member of their coaching staff.

In October 2023, he was appointed assistant manager of NCEFL Premier Division club Maltby Main. He resigned from his role alongside manager Jamie Smith two months later.

In May 2024, Llera was appointed assistant manager of Shirebrook Town.

In March 2025, Llera joined the coaching staff of League One side Bristol Rovers, initially on a short-term basis. On 4 May 2025, following relegation, Llera departed the club alongside manager Iñigo Calderón.

== Club statistics ==
Club	Season	League			Cup		Other		Total	
Club	Season	Division	Apps	Goals	Apps	Goals	Apps	Goals	Apps	Goals
San Fernando (loan)	2000–01	Segunda División B	19	0	—		—		19	0
Alicante	2001–02	Segunda División B	27	2	1	0	—		28	2
Alicante	2002–03	Segunda División B	33	1	6	0	—		39	1
Alicante	2003–04	Segunda División B	27	1	1	0	—		28	1
Alicante	2004–05	Segunda División B	15	0	1	0	1 (Note: Appearance in Promotion Play-offs)	1	17	1
Alicante	Total		102	4	9	0	1	1	112	5
Gimnàstic	2005–06	Segunda División	27	3	3	0	—		30	3
Gimnàstic	2006–07	La Liga	12	2	0	0	—		12	2
Gimnàstic	Total		39	5	3	0	—		42	5
Hércules	2007–08	Segunda División	11	1	4	1	—		15	2
Milton Keynes Dons	2008–09	League One	36	2	1	0	1 (Note: Appearance(s) in Football League Trophy)	0	38	2
Charlton Athletic	2009–10	League One	26	4	0	0	1	0	27	4
Charlton Athletic	2010–11	League One	15	2	2	0	1	0	18	2
Charlton Athletic	Total		41	6	2	0	2	0	45	6
Blackpool	2011–12	Championship	0	0	1	0	—		1	0
Brentford (loan)	2011–12	League One	11	1	1	0	2	0	14	1
Sheffield Wednesday (loan)	2011–12	League One	4	0	0	0	0	0	4	0
Sheffield Wednesday	2011–12	League One	16	4	0	0	0	0	16	4
Sheffield Wednesday	2012–13	Championship	41	6	5	0	—		46	6
Sheffield Wednesday	2013–14	Championship	22	0	3	1	—		25	1
Sheffield Wednesday	Total		83	10	8	1	0	0	91	11
Scunthorpe United	2014–15	League One	15	1	6	0	2	0	23	1
Career total			321	28	35	2	8	1	364	31

== Honours ==
=== Club ===
Alicante

- Segunda División B: 2004–05

Sheffield Wednesday

- Football League One runner-up: 2011–12

=== Individual ===
- Football League One Player of the Month: April 2012
