= 2011–12 Football League One =

Football League One
- Season: 2011–12
- Champions: Charlton Athletic (3rd divisional title)
- Promoted: Charlton Athletic; Sheffield Wednesday; Huddersfield Town
- Relegated: Wycombe Wanderers; Chesterfield; Exeter City; Rochdale
- Matches: 552
- Goals: 1,489 (2.7 per match)
- Top goalscorer: Jordan Rhodes (36)
- Biggest home win: Brentford 5–0 Leyton Orient (20 August 2011); Milton Keynes Dons 5–0 Oldham Athletic (18 February 2012); Wycombe Wanderers 5–0 Hartlepool United (25 February 2012)
- Biggest away win: Wycombe Wanderers 0–6 Huddersfield Town (6 January 2012); Yeovil Town 0–6 Stevenage (14 April 2012)
- Highest scoring: Milton Keynes Dons 6–2 Chesterfield (20 August 2011); Sheffield Wednesday 4–4 Huddersfield Town (17 December 2011)
- Longest winning run: 7 games Preston North End
- Longest unbeaten run: 18 games Huddersfield Town
- Longest winless run: 17 games Chesterfield
- Longest losing run: 5 games AFC Bournemouth; Bury; Chesterfield; Exeter; Leyton Orient; Oldham Athletic; Wycombe Wanderers
- Highest attendance: 38,082; Sheffield Wednesday v Wycombe Wanderers (5 May 2012)
- Lowest attendance: 1,930; Rochdale v Exeter City (14 April 2012)

The 2011–12 Football League One (referred to as the Npower Football League One for sponsorship reasons) was the eighth season of the league under its current title and nineteenth season under its current league division format.

== Team changes ==
=== From League One ===
Promoted to the Championship

- Brighton & Hove Albion
- Southampton
- Peterborough United

Relegated to League Two

- Dagenham & Redbridge
- Bristol Rovers
- Plymouth Argyle
- Swindon Town

=== To League One ===
Relegated from the Championship

- Sheffield United
- Scunthorpe United
- Preston North End

Promoted from League Two

- Chesterfield
- Bury
- Wycombe Wanderers
- Stevenage

== Rules changes ==
- The Football League agreed to use the new UEFA financial regulations. Football League One clubs decided to introduce the Salary Cost Management Protocol (SCMP) from this season, teams will only be allowed to spend a fixed proportion of their total turnover on player wages.

== Team overview ==
=== Stadia and locations ===
Locations of teams in the 2011–12 Football League One

Team	Location	Stadium	Capacity
AFC Bournemouth	Bournemouth	Seward Stadium	10,700
Brentford	London	Griffin Park	12,763
Bury	Bury	Gigg Lane	11,840
Carlisle United	Carlisle	Brunton Park	16,981
Charlton Athletic	London	The Valley	27,111
Chesterfield	Chesterfield	B2net Stadium	10,338
Colchester United	Colchester	Colchester Community Stadium	10,064
Exeter City	Exeter	St James Park	8,830
Hartlepool United	Hartlepool	Victoria Park	8,240
Huddersfield Town	Huddersfield	Galpharm Stadium	24,500
Leyton Orient	London	Brisbane Road	9,271
Milton Keynes Dons	Milton Keynes	Stadium:mk	22,000
Notts County	Nottingham	Meadow Lane	21,388
Oldham Athletic	Oldham	Boundary Park	10,638
Preston North End	Preston	Deepdale	23,408
Rochdale	Rochdale	Spotland	10,249
Scunthorpe United	Scunthorpe	Glanford Park	9,088
Sheffield United	Sheffield	Bramall Lane	32,702
Sheffield Wednesday	Sheffield	Hillsborough	39,812
Stevenage	Stevenage	Broadhall Way	6,722
Tranmere Rovers	Birkenhead	Prenton Park	16,789
Walsall	Walsall	Bescot Stadium	11,300
Wycombe Wanderers	High Wycombe	Adams Park	10,284
Yeovil Town	Yeovil	Huish Park	9,565

=== Personnel and sponsoring ===
Team	Manager	Team captain	Chairman	Kit maker	Sponsor
AFC Bournemouth	(England) Paul Groves (caretaker) (England) Shaun Brooks (caretaker)	(England) Darryl Flahavan	(England) Eddie Mitchell (Russia) Maxim Demin	Fila	Focal Point
Brentford	(Germany) Uwe Rösler	(Republic of Ireland) Kevin O'Connor	(England) Greg Dyke	Puma	Hertings Fixings (H); Bathwise (A)
Bury	(England) Richard Barker	(England) Steven Schumacher	(England) Brian Fenton	Surridge	Bury Metropolitan Council
Carlisle United	(England) Greg Abbott	(England) Paul Thirlwell	(England) Andrew Jenkins	Carbrini	Eddie Stobart Transport
Charlton Athletic	(England) Chris Powell	(England) Johnnie Jackson	(England) Michael Slater	Macron	Krbs.com
Chesterfield	(Republic of Ireland) John Sheridan	(England) Mark Allott	(England) Barrie Hubbard	Respect	Vodka Kick
Colchester United	(England) John Ward	(England) Kemal Izzet	(England) Robbie Cowling	Puma	ROL Cruise
Exeter City	(England) Paul Tisdale	(England) David Noble	(England) Edward Chorlton	Carbrini	Flybe
Hartlepool United	(Scotland) Neale Cooper	(England) Sam Collins	(England) Ken Hodcroft	Nike	Dove Energy
Huddersfield Town	(England) Simon Grayson	(England) Peter Clarke	(England) Dean Hoyle	Umbro	Kirklees College (H); RadianB (A)
Leyton Orient	(England) Russell Slade	(England) Matthew Spring	(England) Barry Hearn	Puma	PartyCasino.com
Milton Keynes Dons	(England) Karl Robinson	(England) Dean Lewington	(England) Pete Winkelman	ISC	Doubletree by Hilton
Notts County	(England) Keith Curle	(England) Neal Bishop	(England) Ray Trew	Fila	Fraser Brown (H); Vision Express (A)
Oldham Athletic	(Scotland) Paul Dickov	(South Africa) Dean Furman	(England) Simon Corney	Carbrini	Carbrini
Preston North End	(England) Graham Westley	(Scotland) Paul Coutts	(England) Peter Ridsdale	Puma	Tennent's Lager
Rochdale	(England) John Coleman	(England) Gary Jones	(England) Chris Dunphy	Carbrini	The Co-operative Society
Scunthorpe United	(Wales) Alan Knill	(Republic of Ireland) Cliff Byrne	(England) J. Steven Wharton	Nike	Rainham Steel
Sheffield United	(Northern Ireland) Danny Wilson	(England) Chris Morgan	(England) Kevin McCabe	Macron	Westfield Health (H); Gilder group Volkswagen (A)
Sheffield Wednesday	(England) Dave Jones	(England) Rob Jones	(Serbia) Milan Mandarić	Puma	Gilder group Volkswagen (H); Westfield Health (A)
Stevenage	(England) Gary Smith	(England) Mark Roberts	(England) Phil Wallace	Puma	ServerChoice
Tranmere Rovers	(England) Ronnie Moore	(England) John Welsh	(England) Peter Johnson	Carbrini	Wirral
Walsall	(England) Dean Smith	(England) Andy Butler	(England) Jeff Bonser	Admiral	Surestop
Wycombe Wanderers	(Republic of Ireland) Gary Waddock	(England) Gareth Ainsworth	(England) Steve Hayes	Kappa	Dreams
Yeovil Town	(England) Gary Johnson	(England) Paul Huntington	(England) John Fry	Vandanel	Jones's Building Contractors

==== Managerial changes ====
Team	Outgoing manager	Manner of departure	Date of vacancy	Position in table	Incoming manager	Date of appointment
Sheffield United	(England) Micky Adams	Sacked	10 May 2011	Pre-season	(Northern Ireland) Danny Wilson	27 May 2011
Brentford	(England) Nicky Forster	End of contract	19 May 2011	Pre-season	(Germany) Uwe Rösler	10 June 2011
Rochdale	(England) Keith Hill	Signed by Barnsley	1 June 2011	Pre-season	(England) Steve Eyre	13 June 2011
Hartlepool United	(England) Mick Wadsworth	Sacked	6 December 2011	13th	(Scotland) Neale Cooper	28 December 2011
Preston North End	(England) Phil Brown	Sacked	14 December 2011	10th	(Scotland) Graham Alexander (England) David Unsworth	14 December 2011
Rochdale	(England) Steve Eyre	Sacked	19 December 2011	22nd	(England) John Coleman	24 January 2012
Yeovil Town	(England) Terry Skiverton	Demotion to Assistant Manager	9 January 2012	21st	(England) Gary Johnson	9 January 2012
Preston North End	(Scotland) Graham Alexander (England) David Unsworth	End of tenure as caretakers	13 January 2012	14th	(England) Graham Westley	13 January 2012
Stevenage	(England) Graham Westley	Signed by Preston North End	13 January 2012	7th	(England) Gary Smith	25 January 2012
Huddersfield Town	(England) Lee Clark	Sacked	15 February 2012	4th	(England) Simon Grayson	20 February 2012
Notts County	(England) Martin Allen	Sacked	18 February 2012	11th	(England) Keith Curle	20 February 2012
Sheffield Wednesday	(England) Gary Megson	Sacked	29 February 2012	3rd	(England) Dave Jones	1 March 2012
Tranmere Rovers	(England) Les Parry	Sacked	4 March 2012	19th	(England) Ronnie Moore	4 March 2012
AFC Bournemouth	(England) Lee Bradbury	Sacked	25 March 2012	13th	(England) Paul Groves (caretaker) (England) Shaun Brooks (caretaker)	25 March 2012

== League table ==
Pos	Team	Pld	W	D	L	GF	GA	GD	Pts	Promotion, qualification or relegation
1	Charlton Athletic (C, P)	46	30	11	5	82	36	+46	101	Promotion to Football League Championship
2	Sheffield Wednesday (P)	46	28	9	9	81	48	+33	93	Promotion to Football League Championship
3	Sheffield United	46	27	9	10	92	51	+41	90	Qualification for League One play-offs (Note: Four teams play for one spot and promotion to Football League Championship.)
4	Huddersfield Town (O, P)	46	21	18	7	79	47	+32	81	Qualification for League One play-offs
5	Milton Keynes Dons	46	22	14	10	84	47	+37	80	Qualification for League One play-offs
6	Stevenage	46	18	19	9	69	44	+25	73	Qualification for League One play-offs
7	Notts County	46	21	10	15	75	63	+12	73	
8	Carlisle United	46	18	15	13	65	66	−1	69	
9	Brentford	46	18	13	15	63	52	+11	67	
10	Colchester United	46	13	20	13	61	66	−5	59	
11	AFC Bournemouth	46	15	13	18	48	52	−4	58	
12	Tranmere Rovers	46	14	14	18	49	53	−4	56	
13	Hartlepool United	46	14	14	18	50	55	−5	56	
14	Bury	46	15	11	20	60	79	−19	56	
15	Preston North End	46	13	15	18	54	68	−14	54	
16	Oldham Athletic	46	14	12	20	50	66	−16	54	
17	Yeovil Town	46	14	12	20	59	80	−21	54	
18	Scunthorpe United	46	10	22	14	55	59	−4	52	
19	Walsall	46	10	20	16	51	57	−6	50	
20	Leyton Orient	46	13	11	22	48	75	−27	50	
21	Wycombe Wanderers (R)	46	11	10	25	65	88	−23	43	Relegation to Football League Two
22	Chesterfield (R)	46	10	12	24	56	81	−25	42	Relegation to Football League Two
23	Exeter City (R)	46	10	12	24	46	75	−29	42	Relegation to Football League Two
24	Rochdale (R)	46	8	14	24	47	81	−34	38	Relegation to Football League Two

Updated to match(es) played on 5 May 2012. Source: BBC Sport
Rules for classification: 1) Points; 2) Goal difference; 3) Number of goals scored
(C) Champions; (O) Play-off winners; (P) Promoted; (R) Relegated

== Play-offs ==
Semifinals
3	Sheffield United	0	1	1
6	Stevenage	0	0	0
4	Huddersfield Town	2	1	3
5	Milton Keynes Dons	0	2	2

Final
3	Sheffield United	0 (7)
4	Huddersfield Town (p)	0 (8)

== Results ==
The fixtures for the League One were released on 17 June 2011. The season kick-off was announced for 6 August 2011, and concluded on 5 May 2012.

Home \ Away	BOU	BRE	BRY	CRL	CHA	CHF	COL	EXE	HAR	HUD	LEY	MKD	NTC	OLD	PNE	ROC	SCU	SHU	SHW	STE	TRA	WAL	WYC	YEO
AFC Bournemouth		1–0	1–2	1–1	0–1	0–3	1–1	2–0	1–2	2–0	1–2	0–1	2–1	0–0	1–0	1–1	2–0	0–2	2–0	1–3	2–1	0–2	2–0	0–0
Brentford	1–1		3–0	4–0	0–1	2–1	1–1	2–0	2–1	0–4	5–0	3–3	0–0	2–0	1–3	2–0	0–0	0–2	1–2	0–1	0–2	0–0	5–2	2–0
Bury	1–0	1–1		0–2	1–2	1–1	4–1	2–0	1–2	3–3	1–1	0–0	2–2	0–0	1–0	2–4	0–0	0–3	2–1	1–2	2–0	2–1	1–4	3–2
Carlisle United	2–1	2–2	4–1		0–1	2–1	1–0	4–1	1–2	2–1	4–1	1–3	0–3	3–3	0–0	2–1	0–0	3–2	3–2	1–0	0–0	1–1	2–2	3–2
Charlton Athletic	3–0	2–0	1–1	4–0		3–1	0–2	2–0	3–2	2–0	2–0	2–1	2–4	1–1	5–2	1–1	2–2	1–0	1–1	2–0	1–1	1–0	2–1	3–0
Chesterfield	1–0	2–3	1–0	4–1	0–4		0–1	0–2	2–3	0–2	0–0	1–1	1–3	1–1	0–2	2–1	1–4	0–1	1–0	1–1	1–0	1–1	4–0	2–2
Colchester United	1–1	2–1	4–1	1–1	0–2	1–2		2–0	1–1	1–1	1–1	1–5	4–2	4–1	3–0	0–0	1–1	1–1	1–1	1–6	4–2	1–0	1–1	2–2
Exeter City	0–2	1–2	3–2	0–0	0–1	2–1	1–1		0–0	0–4	3–0	0–2	1–1	2–0	1–2	3–1	0–0	2–2	2–1	1–1	3–0	4–2	1–3	1–1
Hartlepool United	0–0	0–0	3–0	4–0	0–4	1–2	0–1	2–0		0–0	2–1	1–1	3–0	0–1	0–1	2–0	1–2	0–1	0–1	0–0	0–2	1–1	1–3	0–1
Huddersfield Town	0–1	3–2	1–1	1–1	1–0	1–0	3–2	2–0	1–0		2–2	1–1	2–1	1–0	3–1	2–2	1–0	0–1	0–2	2–1	2–0	1–1	3–0	2–0
Leyton Orient	1–3	2–0	1–0	1–2	1–0	1–1	0–1	3–0	1–1	1–3		0–3	0–3	1–3	2–1	2–1	1–3	1–1	0–1	0–0	0–1	1–1	1–3	2–2
Milton Keynes Dons	2–2	1–2	2–1	1–2	1–1	6–2	1–0	3–0	2–2	1–1	4–1		3–0	5–0	0–1	3–1	0–0	1–0	1–1	1–0	3–0	0–1	4–3	0–1
Notts County	3–1	1–1	2–4	2–0	1–2	1–0	4–1	2–1	3–0	2–2	1–2	1–1		1–0	0–0	2–0	3–2	2–5	1–2	1–0	3–2	2–1	1–1	3–1
Oldham Athletic	1–0	0–2	0–2	2–1	0–1	5–2	1–1	0–0	0–1	1–1	0–1	2–1	3–2		1–1	2–0	1–2	0–2	0–2	1–1	1–0	2–1	2–0	1–2
Preston North End	1–3	1–3	1–1	3–3	2–2	0–0	2–4	1–0	1–0	1–0	0–2	1–1	2–0	3–3		0–1	0–0	2–4	0–2	0–0	2–1	0–0	3–2	4–3
Rochdale	1–0	1–2	3–0	0–0	2–3	1–1	2–2	3–2	1–3	2–2	0–2	1–2	0–1	3–2	1–1		1–0	2–5	0–0	1–5	0–2	3–3	2–1	0–0
Scunthorpe United	1–1	0–0	1–3	1–2	1–1	2–2	1–1	1–0	0–2	2–2	2–3	0–3	0–0	1–2	1–1	1–0		1–1	1–3	1–1	4–2	0–1	4–1	2–1
Sheffield United	2–1	2–0	4–0	1–0	0–2	4–1	3–0	4–4	3–1	0–3	3–1	2–1	2–1	2–3	2–1	3–0	2–1		2–2	2–2	1–1	3–2	3–0	4–0
Sheffield Wednesday	3–0	0–0	4–1	2–1	0–1	3–1	2–0	3–0	2–2	4–4	1–0	3–1	2–1	3–0	2–0	2–0	3–2	1–0		0–1	2–1	2–2	2–0	2–1
Stevenage	2–2	2–1	3–0	1–0	1–0	2–2	0–0	0–0	2–2	2–2	0–1	4–2	0–2	1–0	1–1	4–2	1–2	2–1	5–1		2–1	0–0	1–1	0–0
Tranmere Rovers	0–0	2–2	2–0	1–2	1–1	1–0	0–0	2–0	1–1	1–1	2–0	0–2	1–1	1–0	2–1	0–0	1–1	1–1	1–2	3–0		2–1	2–0	0–0
Walsall	2–2	0–1	2–4	1–1	1–1	3–2	3–1	1–2	0–0	1–1	1–0	0–2	0–1	0–1	1–0	0–0	2–2	3–2	2–1	1–1	0–1		2–0	1–1
Wycombe Wanderers	0–1	0–1	0–2	1–1	1–2	3–2	0–0	3–1	5–0	0–6	4–2	1–1	3–4	2–2	3–4	3–0	1–1	1–0	1–2	0–1	2–1	1–1		2–3
Yeovil Town	1–3	2–1	1–3	0–3	2–3	3–2	3–2	2–2	0–1	0–1	2–2	0–1	1–0	3–1	2–1	3–1	2–2	0–1	2–3	0–6	2–1	2–1	1–0	

Updated to match(es) played on 5 May 2012. Source: The Football League
Legend: Blue = home team win; Yellow = draw; Red = away team win.

== Statistics ==
=== Top goalscorers ===
Rank	Player	Club	Goals
1	(Scotland) Jordan Rhodes	Huddersfield Town	36
2	(Wales) Ched Evans	Sheffield United	29
3	(England) Bradley Wright-Phillips	Charlton Athletic	22
4	(England) Stuart Beavon	Wycombe Wanderers	21
5	(England) Gary Madine	Sheffield Wednesday	18
6	(England) Andy Williams	Yeovil Town	16
7	(Scotland) Lee Miller	Carlisle United	14
8	(Ivory Coast) François Zoko	Carlisle United	13
8	(England) Anthony Wordsworth	Colchester United	13
8	(England) Lee Novak	Huddersfield Town	13
8	(Northern Ireland) Jeff Hughes	Notts County	13
8	(Jamaica) Lee Williamson	Sheffield United	13

=== Top assists ===
Rank	Player	Club	Assists
1	(Republic of Ireland) Stephen Quinn	Sheffield United	14
2	(Jamaica) Clayton Donaldson	Brentford	13
2	(Wales) Ched Evans	Sheffield United	13
4	(England) Chris Lines	Sheffield Wednesday	12
4	(Republic of Ireland) Alan Judge	Notts County	12
6	(England) Lee Novak	Huddersfield Town	11
6	(Scotland) Lee Miller	Carlisle United	11
8	(England) Dean Bowditch	Milton Keynes Dons	10
8	(England) Charlie MacDonald	Milton Keynes Dons	10
8	(England) Danny Green	Charlton Athletic	10
8	(England) Jack Hunt	Huddersfield Town	10
8	(England) Richard Cresswell	Sheffield United	10

=== Scoring ===
- First goal of the season: Anthony Wordsworth for Colchester United against Preston North End (6 August 2011)
- Highest scoring game: 8 goals – Milton Keynes Dons 6–2 Chesterfield (20 August 2011), Sheffield Wednesday 4–4 Huddersfield Town (17 December 2011)Sheffield United 4–4 Exeter City (29 October 2011)
- Most goals scored in a game by one team: 6 goals – Milton Keynes Dons 6–2 Chesterfield (20 August 2011), Colchester United 1–6 Stevenage (26 December 2011), Wycombe Wanderers 0–6 Huddersfield Town (6 January 2012, Yeovil Town 0–6 Stevenage (14 April 2012))
- Widest winning margin: 6 goals – Wycombe Wanderers 0–6 Huddersfield Town (6 January 2012, Yeovil Town 0–6 Stevenage (14 April 2012))
- Most goals scored by a player in a game: 5 goals Jordan Rhodes - Wycombe Wanderers 0–6 Huddersfield Town (6 January 2012)
- Fewest games failed to score in:
- Most games failed to score in:

== Awards ==
=== Monthly awards ===
Month	Manager of the Month		Player of the Month		Notes
Month	Manager	Club	Player	Club	Notes
August	(England) Karl Robinson	Milton Keynes Dons	(England) Ryan Lowe	Sheffield Wednesday	
September	(England) Martin Allen	Notts County	(England) Neil Mellor	Preston North End	
October	(England) Lee Clark	Huddersfield Town	(Scotland) Jordan Rhodes	Huddersfield Town	
November	(England) Chris Powell	Charlton Athletic	(England) Michael Morrison	Charlton Athletic	
December	(Northern Ireland) Danny Wilson	Sheffield United	(Scotland) Jordan Rhodes	Huddersfield Town	
January	(England) Chris Powell	Charlton Athletic	(England) Johnnie Jackson	Charlton Athletic	
February	(England) Chris Powell	Charlton Athletic	(England) Dean Bowditch	Milton Keynes Dons	
March	(England) Dave Jones	Sheffield Wednesday	(Wales) Ched Evans	Sheffield United	
April	(England) Dave Jones	Sheffield Wednesday	(Spain) Miguel Llera	Sheffield Wednesday	

=== Other awards ===
Month	Award	Player	Club	Notes
August	Young Player of the Month	(England) Harry Maguire	Sheffield United	
September	Young Player of the Month	(England) Gary Madine	Sheffield Wednesday	
February	Young Player of the Month	(Wales) Kieron Freeman	Notts County	
April	Young Player of the Month	(England) Luke Freeman	Stevenage	
