= Kamil Zayatte =

Guinean footballer (born 1985)

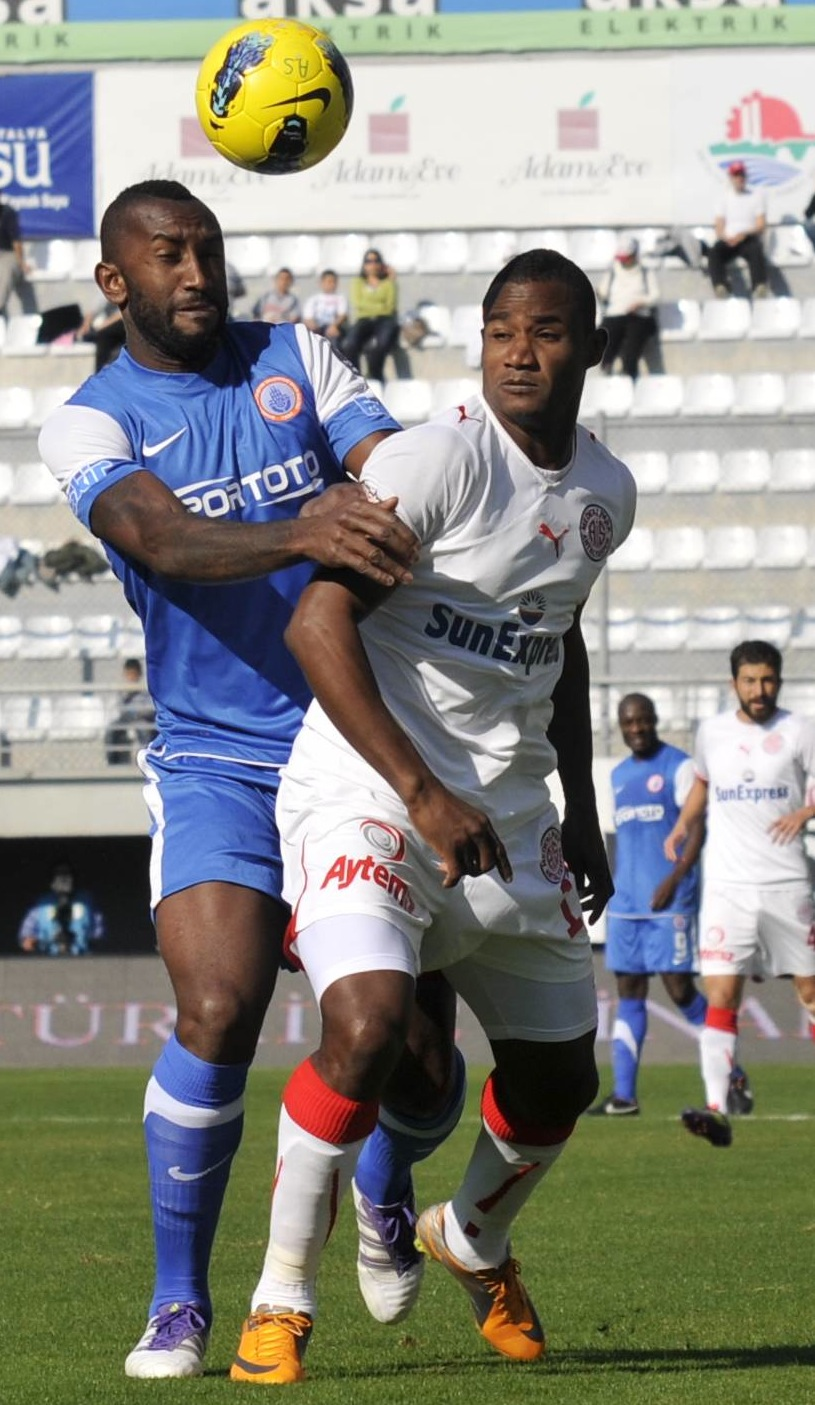
- Zayatte (left) in action for Istanbul BB

Personal information
- Full name: Kamil Zayatte
- Date of birth: 7 March 1985 (age 41)
- Place of birth: Conakry, Guinea
- Height: 1.87 m (6 ft 2 in)
- Positions: Centre-back; defensive midfielder

Youth career
- 2002–2005: Lens

Senior career*
Years	Team	Apps	(Gls)
2003–2007	Lens B	55	(1)
2005–2007	Lens	1	(0)
2007–2009	Young Boys	47	(2)
2008–2009	→ Hull City (loan)	18	(1)
2009–2011	Hull City	53	(2)
2011	Konyaspor	13	(1)
2011–2013	Istanbul BB	26	(0)
2013–2015	Sheffield Wednesday	21	(2)
2015–2016	Al Raed	6	(0)
Total		240	(9)

International career
2006–2015	Guinea	50	(4)
- * Club domestic league appearances and goals

Kamil Zayatte (/ˈkæmɪl ˈzaɪæt/; born 7 March 1985) is a Guinean former professional footballer who played as a centre-back. An Lens youth product, Zayatte's performances at Swiss club Young Boys earned him a loan move to Premier League club Hull City in 2008 which was later made permanent. Following a brief stint with Turkish side Konyaspor in the second half of the 2010–11 season, he joined Istanbul BB. In 2013 he returned to England signing with Sheffield Wednesday where he stayed for two seasons. His last club was Al Raed where he remained for half a season. In addition to his club career, Zayatte made 44 FIFA-official appearances for the Guinea national team.

== Club career ==
Born in Conakry, Zayatte moved from Guinea to Paris, France at the age of fifteen. His first professional club was Lens, where he got to know future Hull City teammate Daniel Cousin. He only played in two games for Lens, one league and one cup, and moved to Young Boys for more first-team opportunities.

In summer 2008, Zayatte had trials with Everton and Newcastle United, before joining Hull City on a season-long loan on 31 August. City had the option to sign him longer-term if they stayed in the Premier League. A deal made the transfer permanent for a fee that matched the club's then-record signing (£2.5 million for Anthony Gardner).

On 25 October 2008, Zayatte scored his first goal for Hull in a 3–0 win against West Bromwich Albion early in the second half, a volley from Dean Marney's right hand corner to maintain Hull's impressive start to the 2008–09 campaign.

On 23 January 2009, it was announced that Zayatte had signed permanently with Hull, on a reported three-year deal.

In September 2010, Zayatte was to sign for Leicester City, first permanently and then on a season-long loan with an optional view of a permanent deal. Leicester, however, pulled out of the deal citing regulatory issues.

On 18 January 2011, Zayatte was allowed to return to France on compassionate grounds, with Hull City retaining his playing registration in order to control any future compensation issues. On 24 January 2011, it was announced that he had signed a contract with Turkish club Konyaspor.

On 27 May 2011, Zayatte signed a three-year contract with İstanbul BB.

On 2 August 2013, Zayatte signed a two-year deal with Sheffield Wednesday subject to FIFA clearance. He scored his first goal for the club in the 17 August 2013 derby against Leeds United, which finished 1–1. Zayatte was one of 11 players released by Sheffield Wednesday at the end of the 2014–15 season.

== International career ==
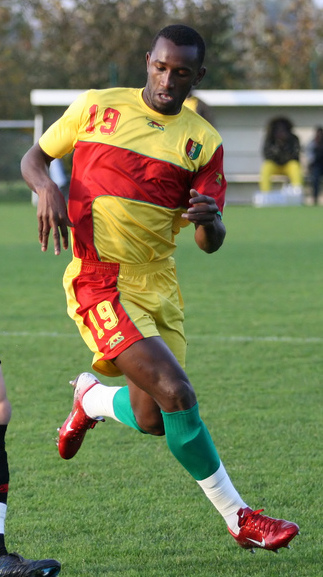
Zayatte in action for Guinea in 2006

Zayatte was called up to the Guinea national team in 2006, making his international debut that year. He subsequently participated in the 2008 Africa Cup of Nations, appearing in the group stage and quarter-final. Guinea were eliminated after suffering a 5–0 defeat to the Ivory Coast in the quarter-finals.

On 12 October 2008, Zayatte scored his first international goal in a 2010 FIFA World Cup qualification match against the Kenya, helping Guinea secure a 3–2 victory. On 28 March 2009, he scored again in a World Cup qualifying match against the Burkina Faso, although Guinea lost 4–2. On 11 August 2010, he scored in a friendly against the Mali, contributing to a 2–0 victory. He also scored against the Ethiopia on 5 September of the same year in a 2012 Africa Cup of Nations qualifying match, helping Guinea win 4–1.

He also participated in the 2012 Africa Cup of Nations, featuring in all three of Guinea's group-stage matches. Guinea were eliminated in the group stage, and Zayatte subsequently continued to represent his country in competitions including the 2014 FIFA World Cup qualification and the 2015 Africa Cup of Nations qualifiers.

Zayatte was also included in Guinea's squad for the 2015 Africa Cup of Nations. However, he did not feature in any of the group-stage matches against Ivory Coast, the Cameroon, and Mali, or in the quarter-final against the Ghana. Guinea were eliminated after losing 3–0 to Ghana.

== Career statistics ==
#	Date	Venue	Opponent	Score	Result	Competition
1.	12 October 2008	Stade 28 Septembre, Conakry, Guinea	Kenya	3–2	Win	2010 WC qualification
2.	11 February 2009	Roumdé Adjia Stadium, Garoua, Cameroon	Cameroon	3–1	Loss	Friendly
3.	11 August 2010	Stade Antoine de Saint-Exupéry, Marignane, France	Mali	0–2	Win	Friendly
4.	5 September 2010	Addis Ababa Stadium, Addis Ababa, Ethiopia	Ethiopia	1–4	Win	2012 ANC qualification
