= John Hemmingham =

English football supporter (born 1963)

- Born: John Hemmingham; 26 February 1963 (age 63); Sheffield, England
- Other name: "Hema"
- Occupation: Commercial manager
- Known for: Leader of The England Band

John Hemmingham (born 26 February 1963) is an association football supporter and football administrator from Sheffield, England. He is best known as the leader and trumpet player of the England Band. Hemmingham first started playing music at football in 1993 with Sheffield Wednesday fans. In 1996, he was invited to play at England national football team matches. He has since played at other sporting events including the Olympics and boxing matches.

Hemmingham also works in football administration. He started in 2001 as the chief executive of The Owls Trust until a dispute with the Sheffield Wednesday chairman caused him to resign in 2004. Hemmingham then went on to work at other football clubs, including Leeds United and Mansfield Town before taking a position at Sheffield Wednesday after his relations improved with them.

== Band ==
=== Sheffield Wednesday ===
Hemmingham started playing music at football matches in 1993 when he took a bugle to a Sheffield Wednesday match away at Everton's Goodison Park and played the fanfare to Aida. The action was noticed by local newspapers and after a phone call to Hemmingham from Sheffield Wednesday manager, Trevor Francis, Sheffield Wednesday then hired Hemmingham and a group of Sheffield Wednesday supporters to form an official club band which became known as the "Kop Band". Although the band became popular, Hemmingham and the Kop Band have been banned from Steel City derby rivals Sheffield United's stadium, Bramall Lane a number of times. In 2002, they were banned from Bramall Lane because Sheffield United were concerned that playing music might lead to "unsafe crowd movement" and "unacceptable structural movement" by Sheffield United's safety officer.

=== England ===
In 1996, Hemmingham, along with the Kop Band, were invited by the head of The Football Association, David Davies to form a supporters band for the England national team in time for UEFA Euro 96. Hemmingham accepted and the Kop Band became known as the England Supporters Band. Since then, Hemmingham claims he has not missed an England game. As well as being viewed as the leader of the band, Hemmingham is also the managing director of them.

After being offered a recording deal by Virgin Group chairman, Richard Branson, Hemmingham and the band released The Great Escape theme tune as singles for the 1998 FIFA World Cup and UEFA Euro 2000. The England Supporters band then started receiving backing from commercial sponsors. In 2006, the band was sponsored by Leicester-based company Pukka Pies, becoming known as the Pukka Pies England Band until 2014.

In 2010 publishers, Peakpublish announced they had signed a deal with Hemmingham for him to write two books about the formation of the England Supporters Band and his experiences with them. The books were called The Story of the England Supporters' Band and Playing for England.

=== Other sports ===
Hemmingham has also led the England Band to other sporting events. In 2008, Hemmingham took the band to Beijing, China during the Beijing 2008 Summer Olympics to support Team GB however they were not permitted to enter the Beijing National Stadium with their instruments and instead played on the streets of Beijing. In 2012, during the London 2012 Summer Olympics it was announced that the England Band would be supporting both the Great Britain men's national field hockey team and the Great Britain women's national field hockey team during their matches at the Olympics. Hemmingham has also taken the band to Las Vegas, United States as well as the City of Manchester Stadium to support Manchester boxer, Ricky Hatton. They have also attended Rugby sevens matches to support the England national team.

== Football administration ==
Hemmingham first started in football administration as the chief executive of an independent supporters group called The Owls Trust, which he helped establish, in 2001. The Owls Trust was disliked by many Sheffield Wednesday fans and by Sheffield Wednesday chairman Dave Allen as it was perceived that it was a vehicle leading towards a takeover by Ken Bates, then chairman of Sheffield Wednesday's rivals Leeds United, as The Owls Trust controlled a large amount of shares and Hemmingham had publicly stated support for Bates.

After an attempted boardroom coup by The Owls Trust to remove Allen from the chairmanship in an extraordinary general meeting in October 2004, in 2005, The Owls Trust were evicted from their offices at Hillsborough Stadium, Hemmingham was banned from executive areas of the stadium and The Kop Band was asked to reduce its numbers by Allen. Hemmingham's ban was then later extended to a full stadium ban from Hillsborough. As a result of this, after securing an area for matchday parking, Hemmingham resigned to take a full-time position at Bates' Leeds United as head of customer services and membership. This led to Hemmingham receiving death threats from some Sheffield Wednesday fans.

In January 2008, Hemmingham left Leeds United and in August, he was appointed as the chief executive of non-league side, Mansfield Town where he oversaw the expansion of the capacity of their Field Mill stadium. However, in January 2009, he left his position after three months. Also in January, his relations with Sheffield Wednesday improved after Allen was no longer chairman and the new directors at the club, Lee Strafford and Nick Parker elected to remove Hemmingham's ban from Hillsborough. In 2011, Hemmingham rejoined Sheffield Wednesday as the Commercial Manager of Sheffield Wednesday Ladies.

== Personal life ==
Hemmingham has been married since 2007.
