= July 31 =

July 31 this year in various calendars
- Friday, 31 July 2026
Akan	Kurufie
Armenian	11 Nawasardi 1476
Aztec	Pānquetzaliztli 2, 8 Itzcuintli
Babylonian	16 Du'uzu, 2337 SE
Balinese pawukon	Menga, Pasah, Menala, Wage, Paniron, Sukra of Krulut, Yama, Urungan, Pandita
Bengali	16 Shrabon, BS 1433
Chinese	Yang Fire Horse・Ox Mansion; Fire Horse Year, Month 6, Day 18 (Dashu, 7 days until Liqiu)
Common Era	31 July 2026 CE
Coptic	24 Epip, AM 1742
Egyptian	16 Choiak, 2775 NE
Ethiopian	24 Ḥamlē, 2018 Amätä Məhrät
French Republican	Décade II, Tridi de Thermidor de l'Année 234 de la République
Gregorian	31 July, AD 2026
Hebrew	17 Av, AM 5786
Hindu	Dhaniṣṭhā・Ayuṣmān; Solar: 15 Śrāvaṇa, 1948 SE; Lunisolar: Dvitīyā, Kṛishna pakṣa of Āṣāḍha, 2083 VE; Rāudra・5127 KY・1,872,787
Icelandic	Föstudagur, 6 Heyannir 2026
Islamic	15 Safar, AH 1448 (using tabular method)
ISO week date	2026-W31-5
Japanese	18 Minazuki, Reiwa 8 (Taisho, 7 days until Risshū)
Julian	18 July, AD 2026 (AM 7534)
Julian day	2461253
Korean	18 Yangdal, 4359 DE
Maya	13.0.13.14.10; 3 Yaxkin, 8 Oc
Roman	ante diem XV Kalendas Augustas, MMDCCLXXIX AUC
Solar Hijri	9 Mordad, SH 1405
Tibetan	17 chu stod, me pho rta 2153 or 1772 or 1000

<<	July					>>
Su	Mo	Tu	We	Th	Fr	Sa
			1	2	3	4
5	6	7	8	9	10	11
12	13	14	15	16	17	18
19	20	21	22	23	24	25
26	27	28	29	30	31
2026

July 31 in recent years
2026 (Friday)
2025 (Thursday)
2024 (Wednesday)
2023 (Monday)
2022 (Sunday)
2021 (Saturday)
2020 (Friday)
2019 (Wednesday)
2018 (Tuesday)
2017 (Monday)

July 31 is the 212th day of the year (213th in leap years) in the Gregorian calendar; 153 days remain until the end of the year.

== Events ==
=== Pre-1600 ===
- 398 – End of the Gildonic rebellion after Gildo's forces are defeated by forces loyal to Western Roman Emperor Honorius under Gildo's brother Mascezel and Gildo's subsequent death.
- 432 – Election of pope Sixtus III following the death of pope Celestine I four days prior.
- 768 – Antipope Constantine II is arrested by primicerius Christopher and Lombard troops sent to aid him by king Desiderius.
- 781 – The oldest recorded eruption of Mount Fuji (Traditional Japanese date: Sixth day of the seventh month of the first year of the Ten'o (天応) era).
- 1009 – Pope Sergius IV becomes the 142nd pope, succeeding Pope John XVIII.
- 1201 – Attempted usurpation by John Komnenos the Fat for the throne of Alexios III Angelos.
- 1423 – Hundred Years' War: Battle of Cravant: A Franco-Scottish army is defeated by the Anglo-Burgundians at Cravant on the banks of the river Yonne.
- 1451 – Jacques Cœur is arrested by order of Charles VII of France.
- 1492 – All remaining Jews are expelled from Spain when the Alhambra Decree takes effect.
- 1498 – On his third voyage to the Western Hemisphere, Christopher Columbus becomes the first European to discover the island of Trinidad.

=== 1601–1900 ===
- 1618 – Maurice, Prince of Orange disbands the waardgelders militia in Utrecht, a pivotal event in the Remonstrant/Counter-Remonstrant tensions.
- 1655 – Russo-Polish War (1654–67): The Russian army enters the capital of the Grand Duchy of Lithuania, Vilnius, which it holds for six years.
- 1658 – Aurangzeb is proclaimed Mughal emperor of India.
- 1667 – The treaty of Breda ends the second Anglo-Dutch War and grants England in possession of New Amsterdam.
- 1703 – Daniel Defoe is placed in a pillory for the crime of seditious libel after publishing a politically satirical pamphlet, but is pelted with flowers.
- 1715 – Seven days after a Spanish treasure fleet of 12 ships left Havana, Cuba for Spain, 11 of them sink in a storm off the coast of Florida. A few centuries later, treasure is salvaged from these wrecks.
- 1741 – Charles Albert of Bavaria invades Upper Austria and Bohemia.
- 1763 – Odawa Chief Pontiac's forces defeat British troops at the Battle of Bloody Run during Pontiac's War.
- 1777 – The U.S. Second Continental Congress passes a resolution that the services of Gilbert du Motier, Marquis de Lafayette "be accepted, and that, in consideration of his zeal, illustrious family and connexions, he have the rank and commission of major-general of the United States."
- 1790 – The first U.S. patent is issued, to inventor Samuel Hopkins for a potash process.
- 1856 – Christchurch, New Zealand, is chartered as a city.
- 1865 – The first narrow-gauge mainline railway in the world opens at Grandchester, Queensland, Australia.
- 1874 – Patrick Francis Healy becomes the first African-American inaugurated as president of a predominantly white university, Georgetown University.

=== 1901–present ===
- 1904 – Russo-Japanese War: Battle of Hsimucheng: Units of the Imperial Japanese Army defeat units of the Imperial Russian Army in a strategic confrontation.
- 1917 – World War I: The Battle of Passchendaele begins near Ypres in West Flanders, Belgium.
- 1932 – The NSDAP (Nazi Party) wins more than 38% of the vote in German elections.
- 1938 – Bulgaria signs a non-aggression pact with Greece and other states of Balkan Antanti (Turkey, Romania, Yugoslavia).
- 1938 – Archaeologists discover engraved gold and silver plates from King Darius the Great in Persepolis.
- 1941 – The Holocaust: Under instructions from Adolf Hitler, Nazi official Hermann Göring orders SS General Reinhard Heydrich to "submit to me as soon as possible a general plan of the administrative material and financial measures necessary for carrying out the desired Final Solution of the Jewish question."
- 1941 – World War II: The Battle of Smolensk concludes with Germany capturing about 300,000 Soviet Red Army prisoners.
- 1945 – Pierre Laval, the fugitive former leader of Vichy France, surrenders to Allied soldiers in Austria.
- 1948 – At Idlewild Field in New York, New York International Airport (later renamed John F. Kennedy International Airport) is dedicated.
- 1948 – USS Nevada is sunk by an aerial torpedo after surviving hits from two atomic bombs (as part of post-war tests) and being used for target practice by three other ships.
- 1964 – Ranger program: Ranger 7 sends back the first close-up photographs of the moon, with images 1,000 times clearer than anything ever seen from earth-bound telescopes.
- 1966 – The pleasure cruiser MV Darlwyne disappears off the Cornwall coast with the loss of all 31 aboard.
- 1970 – Black Tot Day: The last day of the officially sanctioned rum ration in the Royal Navy.
- 1971 – Apollo program: The Apollo 15 astronauts become the first to ride in a lunar rover.
- 1972 – The Troubles: In Operation Motorman, the British Army re-takes the urban no-go areas of Northern Ireland. It is the biggest British military operation since the Suez Crisis of 1956, and the biggest in Ireland since the Irish War of Independence. Later that day, nine civilians are killed by car bombs in the village of Claudy.
- 1973 – A Delta Air Lines jetliner, flight DL 723, crashes while landing in fog at Logan International Airport, Boston, Massachusetts, killing 89.
- 1975 – The Troubles: Three members of a popular cabaret band and two gunmen are killed during a botched paramilitary attack in Northern Ireland.
- 1987 – A tornado occurs in Edmonton, Alberta, killing 27 people.
- 1988 – Thirty-two people are killed and 1,674 injured when a bridge at the Sultan Abdul Halim ferry terminal collapses in Butterworth, Penang, Malaysia.
- 1991 – The United States and Soviet Union both sign the START I Strategic Arms Reduction Treaty, the first to reduce (with verification) both countries' stockpiles.
- 1991 – Singing Revolution: Soviet Special Purpose Police Unit forces (OMON) kill seven Lithuanian customs officials in Medininkai, the deadliest of the Soviet OMON assaults on Lithuanian border posts.
- 1992 – The nation of Georgia joins the United Nations.
- 1992 – Thai Airways International Flight 311 crashes into a mountain north of Kathmandu, Nepal, killing all 113 people on board.
- 1992 – China General Aviation Flight 7552 crashes during takeoff from Nanjing Dajiaochang Airport, killing 108.
- 1992 – Space Shuttle program: Atlantis is launched on STS-46 to deploy the European Retrievable Carrier and the Tethered Satellite System.
- 1997 – FedEx Express Flight 14 crashes at Newark International Airport, injuring five.
- 1999 – Discovery Program: Lunar Prospector: NASA intentionally crashes the spacecraft into the Moon, thus ending its mission to detect frozen water on the Moon's surface.
- 2006 – Fidel Castro hands over power to his brother, Raúl.
- 2007 – Operation Banner, the presence of the British Army in Northern Ireland, and the longest-running British Army operation ever, comes to an end.
- 2008 – East Coast Jets Flight 81 crashes near Owatonna Degner Regional Airport in Owatonna, Minnesota, killing all eight people on board.
- 2012 – Michael Phelps breaks the record set in 1964 by Larisa Latynina for the most medals won at the Olympics.
- 2014 – Gas explosions in the southern Taiwanese city of Kaohsiung kill at least 20 people and injure more than 270.
- 2020 – A De Havilland Canada DHC-2 Beaver and Piper PA-12 Super Cruiser collide over Soldotna, Alaska, killing all seven people on board both aircraft, including state representative Gary Knopp.

== Births ==
=== Pre-1600 ===
- 1143 – Emperor Nijō of Japan (died 1165)
- 1396 – Philip III, Duke of Burgundy (died 1467)
- 1526 – Augustus, Elector of Saxony (died 1586)
- 1527 – Maximilian II, Holy Roman Emperor (died 1576)
- 1595 – Philipp Wolfgang, Count of Hanau-Lichtenberg (died 1641)
- 1598 – Alessandro Algardi, Italian sculptor (died 1654)

=== 1601–1900 ===
- 1686 – Charles of France, Duke of Berry (died 1714)
- 1702 – Jean Denis Attiret, French missionary and painter (died 1768)
- 1704 – Gabriel Cramer, Swiss mathematician and physicist (died 1752)
- 1718 – John Canton, English physicist and academic (died 1772)
- 1724 – Noël François de Wailly, French lexicographer and author (died 1801)
- 1759 – Ignaz Anton von Indermauer, Austrian nobleman and government official (died 1796)
- 1777 – Pedro Ignacio de Castro Barros, Argentine priest and politician (died 1849)
- 1796 – Jean-Gaspard Deburau, Czech-French actor and mime (died 1846)
- 1800 – Friedrich Wöhler, German chemist and academic (died 1882)
- 1803 – John Ericsson, Swedish-American engineer, designed the USS Monitor, the first ironclad warship of the US Navy (died 1889).
- 1816 – George Henry Thomas, American general (died 1870)
- 1826 – Juhani Aataminpoika, Finnish serial killer (died 1854)
- 1826 – William S. Clark, American colonel and politician (died 1886)
- 1835 – Henri Brisson, French lawyer and politician, 50th Prime Minister of France (died 1912)
- 1835 – Paul Du Chaillu, French-American anthropologist and explorer (died 1903)
- 1836 – Vasily Sleptsov, Russian author and activist (died 1878)
- 1837 – William Quantrill, American captain (died 1865)
- 1839 – Ignacio Andrade, Venezuelan general and politician, 25th President of Venezuela (died 1925)
- 1843 – Peter Rosegger, Austrian poet and author (died 1918)
- 1847 – Ignacio Cervantes, Cuban pianist and composer (died 1905)
- 1854 – José Canalejas, Spanish academic and politician, Prime Minister of Spain (died 1912)
- 1854 – Arthur Barclay, 15th president of Liberia (died 1938)
- 1858 – Richard Dixon Oldham, English seismologist and geologist (died 1936)
- 1858 – Marion Talbot, American educator (died 1948)
- 1860 – Mary Vaux Walcott, American painter and illustrator (died 1940)
- 1867 – S. S. Kresge, American businessman, founded Kmart (died 1966)
- 1875 – Jacques Villon, French painter (died 1963)
- 1877 – Louisa Bolus, South African botanist and taxonomist (died 1970)
- 1880 – Premchand, Indian author and playwright (died 1936)
- 1884 – Carl Friedrich Goerdeler, Polish-German economist and politician (died 1945)
- 1886 – Salvatore Maranzano, Italian-American mob boss (died 1931)
- 1886 – Fred Quimby, American animation producer (died 1965)
- 1886 – Larry Doyle, American baseball player (died 1974)
- 1887 – Hans Freyer, German sociologist and philosopher (died 1969)
- 1892 – Herbert W. Armstrong, American evangelist and publisher, founded Worldwide Church of God (died 1986)
- 1892 – Joseph Charbonneau, Canadian archbishop (died 1959)
- 1894 – Fred Keenor, Welsh footballer (died 1972)

=== 1901–present ===
- 1901 – Jean Dubuffet, French painter and sculptor (died 1985)
- 1902 – Gubby Allen, Australian-English cricketer and soldier (died 1989)
- 1904 – Brett Halliday, American engineer, surveyor, and author (died 1977)
- 1907 – Neil Robinson, American baseball player (died 1983)
- 1909 – Erik von Kuehnelt-Leddihn, Austrian theorist and author (died 1999)
- 1911 – George Liberace, American violinist (died 1983)
- 1912 – Bill Brown, Australian cricketer (died 2008)
- 1912 – Milton Friedman, American economist and academic, Nobel Prize laureate (died 2006)
- 1912 – Irv Kupcinet, American football player and journalist (died 2003)
- 1913 – Bryan Hextall, Canadian ice hockey player (died 1984)
- 1914 – Paul J. Christiansen, American conductor and composer (died 1997)
- 1914 – Mario Bava, Italian director and screenwriter (died 1980)
- 1914 – Louis de Funès, French actor and screenwriter (died 1983)
- 1916 – Sibte Hassan, Pakistani journalist, scholar, and activist (died 1986)
- 1916 – Billy Hitchcock, American baseball player, coach, and manager (died 2006)
- 1916 – Bill Todman, American screenwriter and producer (died 1979)
- 1918 – Paul D. Boyer, American biochemist and academic, Nobel Prize laureate (died 2018)
- 1918 – Hank Jones, American pianist, composer, and bandleader (died 2010)
- 1918 – Frank Renouf, New Zealand businessman and financier (died 1998)
- 1919 – Hemu Adhikari, Indian cricketer (died 2003)
- 1919 – Curt Gowdy, American sportscaster and actor (died 2006)
- 1919 – Primo Levi, Italian chemist and author (died 1987)
- 1920 – James E. Faust, American religious leader, lawyer, and politician (died 2007)
- 1921 – Peter Benenson, English lawyer and activist, founded Amnesty International (died 2005)
- 1921 – Donald Malarkey, American sergeant and author (died 2017)
- 1921 – Whitney Young, American activist (died 1971)
- 1922 – Hank Bauer, American baseball player and manager (died 2007)
- 1923 – Ahmet Ertegun, Turkish-American songwriter and producer, founded Atlantic Records (died 2006)
- 1923 – Stephanie Kwolek, American chemist and engineer, invented Kevlar (died 2014)
- 1924 – Jimmy Evert, American tennis player and coach (died 2015)
- 1925 – Carmel Quinn, Irish singer, actress and writer (died 2021)
- 1925 – John Swainson, Canadian-American jurist and politician, 42nd Governor of Michigan (died 1994)
- 1926 – Bernard Nathanson, American physician and activist (died 2011)
- 1926 – Hilary Putnam, American mathematician, computer scientist, and philosopher (died 2016)
- 1927 – Peter Nichols, English author and playwright (died 2019)
- 1928 – Bill Frenzel, American lieutenant and politician (died 2014)
- 1929 – Lynne Reid Banks, English author (died 2024)
- 1929 – Gilles Carle, Canadian director and screenwriter (died 2009)
- 1929 – Oriana Fallaci, Italian journalist and writer (died 2006)
- 1929 – Don Murray, American actor (died 2024)
- 1929 – José Santamaría, Uruguayan footballer and manager (died 2026)
- 1931 – Nick Bollettieri, American tennis player and coach (died 2022)
- 1931 – Kenny Burrell, American singer-songwriter and guitarist
- 1932 – Ted Cassidy, American actor and screenwriter (died 1979)
- 1932 – John Searle, American philosopher and academic (died 2025)
- 1933 – Cees Nooteboom, Dutch journalist, author, and poet (died 2026)
- 1935 – Yvon Deschamps, Canadian comedian, actor, and producer
- 1935 – Geoffrey Lewis, American actor and screenwriter (died 2015)
- 1939 – Steuart Bedford, English pianist and conductor (died 2021)
- 1939 – Susan Flannery, American actress
- 1939 – France Nuyen, Vietnamese-French actress
- 1940 – Stanley R. Jaffe, American film producer and director (died 2025)
- 1941 – Amarsinh Chaudhary, Indian politician, 8th Chief Minister of Gujarat (died 2004)
- 1943 – William Bennett, American journalist and politician, 3rd United States Secretary of Education
- 1943 – Lobo, American singer-songwriter and guitarist
- 1944 – Geraldine Chaplin, American actress and screenwriter
- 1944 – Jonathan Dimbleby, English journalist and author
- 1944 – Sherry Lansing, American film producer
- 1944 – Robert C. Merton, American economist and academic, Nobel Prize laureate
- 1944 – David Norris, Irish scholar and politician
- 1945 – William Weld, American lawyer and politician, 68th Governor of Massachusetts
- 1946 – Gary Lewis, American pop-rock musician
- 1947 – Karl Green, English bass player and songwriter
- 1947 – Richard Griffiths, English actor (died 2013)
- 1947 – Mumtaz, Indian actress
- 1947 – Hubert Védrine, French politician, French Minister of Foreign Affairs
- 1947 – Ian Beck, English children's illustrator and author
- 1948 – Russell Morris, Australian singer-songwriter and guitarist
- 1949 – Alan Meale, English journalist and politician
- 1950 – Richard Berry, French actor, director, and screenwriter
- 1951 – Evonne Goolagong Cawley, Australian tennis player
- 1952 – Chris Ahrens, American ice hockey player
- 1952 – Alan Autry, American football player, actor, and politician, 23rd Mayor of Fresno, California
- 1952 – Helmuts Balderis, Latvian ice hockey player and coach
- 1952 – João Barreiros, Portuguese author and critic
- 1952 – Faye Kellerman, American author
- 1953 – Ted Baillieu, Australian architect and politician, 46th Premier of Victoria
- 1953 – Jimmy Cook, South African cricketer and coach
- 1953 – Hugh McDowell, English cellist (died 2018)
- 1954 – Derek Smith, Canadian ice hockey player
- 1956 – Michael Biehn, American actor, director, producer, and screenwriter
- 1956 – Bill Callahan, American football player and coach
- 1956 – Ron Kuby, American lawyer and radio host
- 1956 – Deval Patrick, American lawyer and politician, 71st Governor of Massachusetts
- 1956 – Lynne Rae Perkins, American author and illustrator
- 1956 – Lynn "Lynja" Yamada Davis, American online celebrity chef (died 2024)
- 1957 – Daniel Ash, English singer-songwriter and guitarist
- 1957 – Mark Thompson, English business executive
- 1958 – Bill Berry, American drummer and songwriter
- 1958 – Mark Cuban, American businessman and television personality
- 1958 – Suzanne Giraud, French music editor and composer
- 1959 – Stanley Jordan, American guitarist, pianist, and songwriter
- 1959 – Andrew Marr, Scottish journalist and author
- 1959 – Kim Newman, English journalist and author
- 1960 – Dale Hunter, Canadian ice hockey player and coach
- 1960 – Malcolm Ross, Scottish guitarist and songwriter
- 1961 – Frank Gardner, English captain and journalist
- 1961 – Sanusi Lamido Sanusi, Nigerian banker, royal
- 1962 – John Chiang, American lawyer and politician, 31st California State Controller
- 1962 – Kevin Greene, American football player and coach (died 2020)
- 1962 – Wesley Snipes, American actor and producer
- 1962 – Troy Murray, Canadian ice hockey player (died 2026)
- 1963 – Norman Cook (Fatboy Slim), English DJ and musician
- 1963 – Fergus Henderson, English chef and author
- 1963 – Brian Skrudland, Canadian ice hockey player and coach
- 1964 – Jim Corr, Irish singer-songwriter and guitarist
- 1964 – Urmas Hepner, Estonian footballer and coach
- 1965 – Scott Brooks, American basketball player and coach
- 1965 – John Laurinaitis, American wrestler and producer
- 1965 – Ian Roberts, English-Australian rugby league player and actor
- 1965 – J. K. Rowling, English author and film producer
- 1966 – Dean Cain, American actor, producer, and screenwriter
- 1967 – Tony Massenburg, American basketball player
- 1967 – Tim Wright, Welsh composer
- 1968 – Saeed-Al-Saffar, Emirati cricketer
- 1968 – Julian Richards, Welsh director and producer
- 1969 – Antonio Conte, Italian footballer and manager
- 1969 – Loren Dean, American actor
- 1969 – Kenneth D. Schisler, American lawyer and politician
- 1970 – Ahmad Akbarpour, Iranian author and poet
- 1970 – Ben Chaplin, English actor
- 1970 – Andrzej Kobylański, Polish footballer and manager
- 1970 – Giorgos Sigalas, Greek basketball player, coach, and sportscaster
- 1971 – Gus Frerotte, American football player and coach
- 1971 – Eve Best, English actress
- 1973 – Nathan Brown, Australian rugby league player and coach
- 1974 – Emilia Fox, English actress
- 1974 – Leona Naess, American-English singer-songwriter and guitarist
- 1974 – Jonathan Ogden, American football player
- 1975 – Randy Flores, American baseball player and coach
- 1975 – Andrew Hall, South African cricketer
- 1975 – Gabe Kapler, American baseball player and manager
- 1976 – Joshua Cain, American guitarist and producer
- 1976 – Paulo Wanchope, Costa Rican footballer and manager
- 1978 – Zac Brown, American country singer-songwriter and guitarist
- 1978 – Will Champion, English drummer (Coldplay)
  - Abelardo de la Espreilla, Colombian attorney, businessman and politician, President of Colombia (2026-present)
- 1978 – Nick Sorensen, American football player and sportscaster
- 1978 – Justin Wilson, English race car driver (died 2015)
- 1979 – Jaco Erasmus, South African-Italian rugby player
- 1979 – J. J. Furmaniak, American baseball player
- 1979 – Per Krøldrup, Danish footballer
- 1979 – Carlos Marchena, Spanish footballer
- 1979 – B. J. Novak, American actor, director, producer, and screenwriter
- 1980 – Mikko Hirvonen, Finnish race car driver
- 1980 – Mils Muliaina, New Zealand rugby player
- 1981 – Titus Bramble, English footballer
- 1981 – Vernon Carey, American football player
- 1981 – Paul Whatuira, New Zealand rugby league player
- 1982 – Anabel Medina Garrigues, Spanish tennis player
- 1982 – DeMarcus Ware, American football player
- 1985 – Daniel Ciofani, Italian footballer
- 1985 – Rémy Di Gregorio, French cyclist
- 1986 – Evgeni Malkin, Russian ice hockey player
- 1986 – Brian Orakpo, American football player
- 1987 – Michael Bradley, American soccer player
- 1988 – Alex Glenn, New Zealand rugby league player
- 1988 – A. J. Green, American football player
- 1988 – Charlie Carver, American actor and writer
- 1989 – Victoria Azarenka, Belarusian tennis player
- 1989 – Alexis Knapp, American actress
- 1991 – Réka Luca Jani, Hungarian tennis player
- 1992 – José Fernández, Cuban-American baseball player (died 2016)
- 1992 – Ryan Johansen, Canadian ice hockey player
- 1992 – Kyle Larson, American race car driver
- 1993 – Linus Ullmark, Swedish professional hockey player
- 1995 – Lil Uzi Vert, American hip hop artist
- 1997 – Bobbi Althoff, American podcaster and influencer
- 1997 – Thomas Bryant, American basketball player
- 1998 – Rico Rodriguez, American actor
- 2000 – Kim Sae-ron, South Korean actress (died 2025)
- 2002 – João Gomes, Brazilian singer
- 2002 – Will Penisini, Australian-Tongan rugby league player
- 2003 – Calvin Ramsay, Scottish footballer

== Deaths ==
=== Pre-1600 ===
- 54 BC – Aurelia Cotta, Roman mother of Gaius Julius Caesar (born 120 BC)
- 450 – Peter Chrysologus, Italian bishop and saint (born 380)
- 910 – Feng Xingxi, Chinese warlord
- 975 – Fu Yanqing, Chinese general (born 898)
- 1098 – Hugh of Montgomery, 2nd Earl of Shrewsbury
- 1358 – Étienne Marcel, French rebel leader (born 1302)
- 1396 – William Courtenay, English archbishop and politician, Lord Chancellor of the United Kingdom (born 1342)
- 1508 – Na'od, Ethiopian emperor
- 1556 – Ignatius of Loyola, Spanish priest and theologian, founded the Society of Jesus (born 1491)

=== 1601–1900 ===
- 1616 – Roger Wilbraham, Solicitor-General for Ireland (born 1553)
- 1638 – Sibylla Schwarz, German poet (born 1621)
- 1653 – Thomas Dudley, English soldier and politician, 3rd Governor of Massachusetts Bay Colony (born 1576)
- 1693 – Willem Kalf, Dutch still life painter (born 1619)
- 1726 – Nicolaus II Bernoulli, Swiss mathematician and theorist (born 1695)
- 1750 – John V, king of Portugal (born 1689)
- 1762 – Luis Vicente de Velasco e Isla, Spanish sailor and commander (born 1711)
- 1781 – John Bligh, 3rd Earl of Darnley, British parliamentarian (born 1719)
- 1784 – Denis Diderot, French philosopher and critic (born 1713)
- 1805 – Dheeran Chinnamalai, Indian soldier (born 1756)
- 1864 – Louis Christophe François Hachette, French publisher (born 1800)
- 1875 – Andrew Johnson, American general and politician, 17th President of the United States (born 1808)
- 1884 – Kiến Phúc, Vietnamese emperor (born 1869)
- 1886 – Franz Liszt, Hungarian pianist, composer, and conductor (born 1811)
- 1891 – Jean-Baptiste Capronnier, Belgian stained glass painter (born 1814)

=== 1901–present ===
- 1913 – John Milne, British geologist and mining engineer. (born 1850)
- 1914 – Jean Jaurès, French journalist and politician (born 1859)
- 1917 – Francis Ledwidge, Irish soldier and poet (born 1881)
- 1917 – Hedd Wyn, Welsh language poet (born 1887)
- 1920 – Ion Dragoumis, Greek philosopher and diplomat (born 1878)
- 1940 – Udham Singh, Indian activist (born 1899)
- 1942 – Francis Younghusband, British Army Officer, explorer and spiritual writer (born 1863)
- 1943 – Hedley Verity, English cricketer and soldier (born 1905)
- 1944 – Antoine de Saint-Exupéry, French pilot and poet (born 1900)
- 1951 – Cho Ki-chon, North Korean poet (born 1913)
- 1953 – Robert A. Taft, American soldier and politician (born 1889)
- 1954 – Onofre Marimón, Argentine race car driver (born 1923)
- 1958 – Eino Kaila, Finnish philosopher and psychologist, attendant of the Vienna circle (born 1890)
- 1964 – Jim Reeves, American singer-songwriter (born 1923)
- 1966 – Bud Powell, American pianist (born 1924)
- 1968 – Jack Pizzey, Australian politician, 29th Premier of Queensland (born 1911)
- 1971 – Walter P. Carter, American soldier and activist (born 1923)
- 1972 – Paul-Henri Spaak, Belgian politician, 40th Prime Minister of Belgium, 1st President of the United Nations General Assembly (born 1899)
- 1973 – Azumafuji Kin'ichi, Japanese sumo wrestler, the 40th Yokozuna (born 1921)
- 1979 – Beatrix Lehmann, English actress and director (born 1903)
- 1980 – Pascual Jordan, German physicist, author, and academic (born 1902)
- 1980 – Mohammed Rafi, Indian playback singer (born 1924)
- 1981 – Omar Torrijos, Panamanian general and politician, Military Leader of Panama (born 1929)
- 1985 – Eugene Carson Blake, American religious leader (born 1906)
- 1986 – Chiune Sugihara, Japanese diplomat (born 1900)
- 1987 – Joseph E. Levine, American film producer (b, 1905)
- 1990 – Albert Leduc, Canadian ice hockey player (born 1902)
- 1992 – Leonard Cheshire, English captain and pilot (born 1917)
- 1993 – Baudouin, King of Belgium (born 1930)
- 1997 – Bảo Đại, Vietnamese emperor (born 1913)
- 2000 – William Keepers Maxwell Jr., American editor, novelist, short story writer, and essayist (born 1908)
- 2001 – Francisco da Costa Gomes, Portuguese general and politician, 15th President of Portugal (born 1914)
- 2001 – Friedrich Franz, Hereditary Grand Duke of Mecklenburg-Schwerin (born 1910)
- 2003 – Guido Crepax, Italian author and illustrator (born 1933)
- 2004 – Virginia Grey, American actress (born 1917)
- 2005 – Wim Duisenberg, Dutch economist and politician, 1st President of the European Central Bank (born 1935)
- 2009 – Bobby Robson, English footballer and manager (born 1933)
- 2009 – Harry Alan Towers, English-Canadian screenwriter and producer (born 1920)
- 2012 – Mollie Hunter, Scottish author and playwright (born 1922)
- 2012 – Alfredo Ramos, Brazilian footballer and coach (born 1924)
- 2012 – Gore Vidal, American novelist, screenwriter, and critic (born 1925)
- 2012 – Tony Sly, American musician, singer-songwriter (born 1970)
- 2013 – Michael Ansara, Syrian-American actor (born 1922)
- 2013 – Michel Donnet, English-Belgian general and pilot (born 1917)
- 2013 – John Graves, American captain and author (born 1920)
- 2013 – Trevor Storer, English businessman, founded Pukka Pies (born 1930)
- 2014 – Warren Bennis, American scholar, author, and academic (born 1925)
- 2014 – Nabarun Bhattacharya, Indian journalist and author (born 1948)
- 2014 – Jeff Bourne, English footballer (born 1948)
- 2014 – Wilfred Feinberg, American lawyer and judge (born 1920)
- 2015 – Alan Cheuse, American writer and critic (born 1940)
- 2015 – Howard W. Jones, American surgeon and academic (born 1910)
- 2015 – Billy Pierce, American baseball player and sportscaster (born 1927)
- 2015 – Roddy Piper, Canadian wrestler and actor (born 1954)
- 2015 – Richard Schweiker, American soldier and politician, 14th United States Secretary of Health and Human Services (born 1926)
- 2016 – Chiyonofuji Mitsugu, Japanese sumo wrestler, the 58th Yokozuna (born 1955)
- 2016 – Seymour Papert, South African mathematician (born 1928)
- 2017 – Jeanne Moreau, French actress (born 1928)
- 2018 – Tony Bullimore, British sailor and businessman (born 1939)
- 2019 – Harold Prince, Broadway producer and director, who received more Tony awards than anyone else in history (born 1928)
- 2020 – Alan Parker, English filmmaker (born 1944)
- 2022 – Fidel V. Ramos, 12th President of the Philippines (born 1928)
- 2022 – Bill Russell, NBA Hall of Fame player and coach (born 1934)
- 2023 – Angus Cloud, American actor (born 1998)
- 2024 – Paul Bucha, United States Army Medal of Honor recipient (born 1943)
- 2024 – Ismail Haniyeh, Palestinian politician, political leader of Hamas (born 1962/1963)
- 2026 – Glenn A. Baker, Australian journalist and author (born 1952)
- 2026 – Franco Baresi, Italian footballer (born 1960)
- 2026 – Jakob Butturff, American bowler (born 1994)

== Holidays and observances ==
- Christian feast day:
  - Abanoub
  - Blessed Cecília Schelingová
  - Blessed Solanus Casey
  - Fabius
  - Germanus of Auxerre
  - Giustino de Jacobis
  - Helena of Skövde
  - Ignatius of Loyola
  - Neot
  - July 31 (Eastern Orthodox liturgics)
- Earliest day on which the Feast of Kamál (Perfection) can fall, while August 1 is the latest; observed on the first day of the eighth month of the Baháʼí calendar. (Baháʼí Faith)
- End of the Trinity term (sitting of the High Court of Justice of England)
- Lā Hae Hawaiʻi Day (Hawaii, United States), and its related observance:
  - Sovereignty Restoration Day (Hawaiian sovereignty movement)
- Martyrdom Day of Shahid Udham Singh (Haryana and Punjab, India)
- Treasury Day (Poland)
- Warriors' Day (Malaysia)
