= Wednesdayite =

Sheffield Wednesday fan group

- Logo of Wednesdayite
- Formation: 2014
- Legal status: Registered as a Private Company Limited by Guarantee
- Headquarters: Sheffield
- Members: 721 (as at November 2014)
- Acting Chair: Paul Holmes
- Affiliations: Football Supporters' Federation
- Website: wednesdayite.com

"Wednesdayite" is also a term commonly used to refer to any supporter of Sheffield Wednesday F.C.

Wednesdayite is the largest independent supporters group for Sheffield Wednesday fans.

"Wednesdayite" is the trading name of Wednesdayite Limited, an independent football supporter group.

Wednesdayite operates a number of services with the view to benefit Wednesdayite members, Sheffield Wednesday fans and the wider community, including free football coaching schemes for local schools, the Wednesdayite Lounge matchday bar, the Wednesdayite Away Coach, the Wednesdayite Car Park, regular social events and the SMILE Ticket system – enabling people to attend football matches in Hillsborough that they normally would not be able to attend.

Wednesdayite as an organisation are members of the Football Supporters' Federation.

== History ==
=== The Owls Trust ===
Previous to 'Wednesdayite', the Sheffield Wednesday Supporters' Society functioned under the name of 'The Owls Trust' which was originally set up in 2001. At the time, Sheffield Wednesday club directors Dave Allen, Keith Addy and Geoff Hulley bought an amount of shares in the club equal to 36.7% of the total share capital of Sheffield Wednesday PLC, from investment company Charterhouse.

The purchase of more than 29.9% of any company triggers a mandatory bid for the remaining shares in company law, however to avoid making such a bid, a portion of those shares equal to 9.46% of Sheffield Wednesday PLC were donated to the fledgeling fans' trust.

The organisation angered the then chairman of Sheffield Wednesday, Dave Allen, as well as many Wednesday fans, by being perceived to support a takeover bid by Ken Bates. However, the organisation – in particular its chief executive John Hemmingham and chairman Jim Harrison – maintained that it was not supporting a takeover, but was supporting the principle of allowing potential investors, including Ken Bates, access to relevant documents in order to formulate an educated bid for the company. This feud resulted in the trust being evicted from their offices in Hillsborough.

Hemmingham eventually quit in March 2005 when Bates took control of Yorkshire rivals Leeds and offered him a job as "Head of Membership Development". The move reportedly saw Hemmingham receive death threats, and many fans believe that Hemmingham's actions vindicated Allen.

=== Rebirth as Wednesdayite ===
In light of previous perceptions of the organisation, The Owls Trust received a number of candidates for its board elections in May 2005 and once elected the new board rebranded the organisation to a much more fan-friendly name of 'Wednesdayite' in August 2005. Jim Harrison was replaced at this same time as Chairman by Darryl Keys, a former merchant banker with responsibility for Sports Finance.

Since the rebranding the trust grew massively in size, although they still attracted a lot of controversy. Despite regular attempts to communicate with the club's directors (as dictated by the members who voted massively in favour of working with the incumbent board) many in that board were still hostile to Wednesdayite.

Whilst Wednesdayite's 10.07% shareholding was regarded as a valuable asset for a supporters' trust by the government initiative, Supporters Direct and their member trusts, the Society courted a lot of controversy with the Sheffield Wednesday board and sections of fans.

In September 2005, the former Sheffield Wednesday Chairman, Dave Allen, offered to buy Wednesdayite's share of the club for around £330,000 (which would be put back into the playing squad budget). However Allen refused to address a Wednesdayite members' meeting to discuss this purchase and additionally it was not made clear how any ensuing Capital Gains Tax would be paid to the Inland Revenue, which would possibly leave the Supporters' Trust in tens of thousands of pounds' debt. Wednesdayite members democratically voted in favour of rejecting the offer.

Allen claimed to have increased this offer to £500,000 (from the initial £333,000), however no ballot of members took place regarding this offer, due to the previous rejection.

In July 2007 Wednesdayite were accused in part of being responsible by Dave Allen for the collapse of a takeover by former Everton director Paul Gregg due to their 10.07% shareholding, a claim which Wednesdayite denied. In the months and years that followed, Wednesdayite balloted both members and non-members to gauge opinion on their shareholding across the entire fanbase; and held a vote to decide if members would be willing to listen to offers from any new investor.

Members voted in favour of listening to offers and Wednesdayite, on 2 October 2007, also pledged their shares to a scheme backed by the Sheffield Wednesday Shareholders Association to listen to any offers from new investors willing to achieve a 51% shareholding in the business.

=== Geoff Sheard bid ===
On 13 February 2008, Wednesdayite Chairman Darryl Keys revealed that the group had been approached by different parties with regards to the processes involving the sale of their shareholding. One of those parties was later revealed to be Geoff Sheard, who was said to be fronting a 'Swiss – based trust' and was said to be at an "advanced stage" in steps to buy the club. Wednesdayite membership significantly increased during the period with all members promised that they would be able to take part in any future potential vote deciding whether to sell the shares.

Both Wednesdayite and the Shareholders Association announced they had met with Geoff Sheard on the afternoon of Monday 21 April 2008 to discuss how their respective shareholdings figured in a potential takeover by Sheard's group.

Due to the length of time taken to complete a takeover of the club, speculation mounted amongst the Sheffield Wednesday fanbase as to the role of Wednesdayite's shares in a possible takeover, the identity of consortium members and whether the funds of the group could be legally verified under UK money laundering laws. Wednesdayite issued several statements on their website which were picked up by the press. Wednesdayite's openness in addressing the unfolding situation (whilst all other parties, including the club, remained silent on the subject) saw support for the group grow.

Frustrations led to Sheffield Wednesday themselves appointing financial company Deloitte and Touche to vet potential bidders and facilitate any purchase of an undisclosed tranche of shares, speculated to be at least 10% of the clubs' shares belonging to board member Geoff Hulley and possibly including a further 10% belonging to former director Keith Addy. However, it was believed that due to Geoff Sheard's preference to not go through the club's preferred Deloitte and Touche process, he approached former Chairman, Dave Allen, and Wednesdayite individually.

On 1 July 2008, Wednesdayite received a formal bid from Geoff Sheard, acting for a 'Swiss-based trust'. Wednesdayite immediately referred the correspondence to legal advisors in preparation of a ballot of members on whether to accept the offer for the shareholding. To keep members and the fanbase aware of what was happening, Wednesdayite subsequently published a list of Questions and Answers regarding the bid. It was also announced that Dave Allen had agreed to sell his 10% stake in Sheffield Wednesday PLC to Sheard's group.

Wednesdayite announced on 17 July 2008 that they would formally ballot members to decide the fate of the shares. It was also revealed that the former Home Secretary and Wednesdayite Patron, David Blunkett, has been advising the group with regards to the ballot.

Notice of a Special General Meeting of Wednesdayite was given on 23 July 2008 and ballot forms sent out to all eligible members. The Special General Meeting took place on 6 August 2008. Members were sent detailed supporting information alongside the ballot forms, and the Wednesdayite board recommended members vote 'Yes' to both resolutions:

- Resolution 1: An amendment to Rule 2 iv which currently reads ‘to increase the shareholding in the club as is deemed appropriate and to help safeguard minority interests. The 5,037,017 ordinary shares in Sheffield Wednesday Plc should not be sold or otherwise transferred’. Following amendment it is proposed for Rule 2 iv to read ‘The Society members are free to determine whether the Society holds any shares in the club. Where the Society owns any shares in the club, any decision to relinquish any such holding must be made in General Meeting’.
- Resolution 2: To sell the Society’s holding of 5,037,017 shares in Sheffield Wednesday Plc to Geoff Sheard in accordance with the Society Board’s recommendation and the conditions included therein.

Resolution 1 was passed with a 97.4% majority in favour and Resolution 2 was similarly passed by a majority of 92.1% with a turnout of 77.7% of all members voting. Wednesdayite promptly contacted Sheard, to ask if he would like to continue with the purchase in light of the result.

On 6 October 2008, Wednesdayite withdrew their previous offer to sell shares to Geoff Sheard and his consortium, citing the length of time taken for the takeover to be completed and the lack of verifiable funds. Despite this, Wednesdayite stated they would still be open to revisiting the situation if Mr. Sheard could verify funds – however this would have to result in another member vote taking place.

=== Fighting for the club's future ===
Following the final collapse of the Sheard bid, significant changes took place at the club, with Lee Strafford firstly joining the club board and then quickly becoming Chairman. Strafford's plan to revitalise the Owls hinged on engaging with the fanbase, and as such Wednesdayite were welcomed into the club in ways that mere months ago had seemed unthinkable. Going into the 2009/10 season, Strafford stated to a Wednesdayite members' meeting that he would like to see all Wednesday fans be a member of Wednesdayite, and permitted Wednesdayite membership to be included as an option on season ticket forms.

However, as the political situation continued to unravel at Hillsborough, Strafford eventually resigned as Chairman and with the club facing winding-up petitions from HMRC amid rumours of the club going into administration or worse, Wednesdayite lent their voice to the growing protest movement amongst Wednesday fans, working closely with the Shareholders Association and Time to Go under the Save Our Owls banner.

In December 2010, Milan Mandarić took over as chairman of Sheffield Wednesday with Wednesdayite handing their 10.07% shareholding to the Mandarić family trust as part of the takeover. When Wednesdayite members were balloted on the issue of gifting the shares, 97.9% voted in favour.

=== A New Dawn ===
With the disbursement of the Society's shareholding came the opportunity to carve a new path for Wednesdayite in a post-political era. Wednesdayite changed their mission statement and shifted the emphasis from seeking positive change within the SWFC boardroom to seeking closer ties with the club in order to deliver a better matchday experience for fans, to mutually benefit both supporters and the club, and to reach out to the wider community with the SWFC brand.

At the 2011 Society AGM, Wednesdayite Vice-Chair Eddie Hoyland presented a vision of a future for Wednesdayite as a supporter's club first and foremost, embracing community, matchday and commercial operations to bring benefit to all the main stakeholders in SWFC in the years to come.

== Good causes and community initiatives ==
=== SMILE Tickets ===
With Smile Tickets, Wednesdayite provide matchday tickets to disadvantaged people who would not normally be able to attend games. They are able to provide this scheme through generous donations from members and supporters, together with the support of the club to maximise the Society's ticket-buying power. For every adult Season Ticket the Society purchases through the initiative, Sheffield Wednesday have pledged to honour the current offer of providing a free ticket for under-8's, meaning that tickets will be purchased for both adults and children.

The tickets will be awarded on a match-by-match basis to qualifying applicants who meet specific criteria, with emphasis on providing a matchday experience to long-term sick children and also to unemployed adults who would not be able to attend a match due to their circumstances.

For 2011/12 the SMILE scheme provided matchday tickets for 27 fans to enjoy a Hillsborough experience (7x adult, 3x U18, 3x U13 and 14xU8). In addition to the ticket itself, the recipients and their families are Guests of Honour at the Wednesdayite Lounge and are escorted to the game by Wednesdayite volunteers.

=== Primary Schools Coaching Scheme ===
Another highly regarded community initiative facilitated by Wednesdayite is the Primary Schools Coaching Scheme, of which former Sheffield Wednesday coach Steve Adams provides free curricular-time football coaching under the Wednesdayite banner to Primary Schools and Special Needs schools throughout the community. Wednesdayite secure grants on an annual basis to provide this service, which has so far coached over 8,000 children from over 20 schools.

=== Member services ===
Wednesdayite provide a number of usually discounted facilities for members to maintain a social atmosphere and build up links in the community.

Services include the Wednesdayite Lounge matchday bar, the Wednesdayite Away Coach, the Wednesdayite Car Park, as well as regular football-themed social events. The Society also maintains a strong presence online, with a popular website and busy Facebook and Twitter feeds (as of summer 2010, Wednesdayite's Twitter following was the largest of any Supporter's Trust and larger than all but 6 official club Twitter accounts in English football.

== Current directors ==
Wednesdayite operates on a democratic basis with directors elected to the corporate board at an annual AGM.. Directors work on a voluntary basis and do not draw any salary from the organisation. Likewise, directors will not benefit from any proceeds of sales.

Current directors are:

- John Gath
- Paul Holmes
- Darryl Keys
- Peter Shaw
- Craig Turton
- Jeff Williams
- Neville Wright (Director)

== Patrons ==
Wednesdayite's patrons currently include:

- Rt. Hon. David Blunkett M.P.
