= 2009–10 Sheffield Wednesday F.C. season =

English football club season

Sheffield Wednesday
2009–10 season
- Chairman: Lee Strafford
- Manager: Brian Laws (until 13 December); Sean McAuley (caretaker until 7 January); Alan Irvine
- Championship: 22nd (relegated)
- FA Cup: Third Round (eliminated by Crystal Palace)
- League Cup: Second Round (eliminated by Port Vale)
- Top goalscorer: League: Marcus Tudgay (10); All: Marcus Tudgay (10)
- Highest home attendance: 37,121 (League)
- Lowest home attendance: 18,329 (League); 6,696 (League Cup)
- Average home league attendance: 23,179
Home colours	Away colours

The 2009–10 season will be Sheffield Wednesday's fifth consecutive season in the Football League Championship and 108th season in The Football League since being elected to the Football League First Division in 1892 (from The Football Alliance).

== Chronological list of events ==
- 2 May 2010: The club are relegated to League One after a final day home draw against Crystal Palace.
- 4 March 2010: Chairman Lee Strafford rules out the possibility of the club going into administration.
- 26 February 2010: Defender Frank Simek receives a call-up to the United States men's national soccer team.
- 11 January 2010: Alan Irvine appointed as Manager.
- 13 December 2009: Brian Laws leaves the club by mutual consent after a nine-game winless run with the club in 22nd position in the League.
- 19 August 2009: The club release plans to develop Hillsborough Stadium
- 23 July 2009: Owls season tickets sales exceed 13,000 (actual figure 13,060)
- 15 July 2009: Wednesday turn down a £1.5 million bid from Burnley for Marcus Tudgay in a statement the club called the bid "derisory" and "unwelcome"
- 13 July 2009: Owls win JPL Cup in Malta
- 17 June 2009: The Championship 2009–2010 season fixtures were announced.
- 16 April 2009: Owls reveal that the logo of the Sheffield Children's Hospital will be featured on the shirts rather than that of a sponsor.

== Team kit ==
The team kit's for the 2009–10 season will be produced by Puma. The logo of the Sheffield Children's Hospital will be featured on the shirts rather than that of a sponsor.
£1 from every shirt sale will go to the charity, after a month of being on sale 6,000 home shirts had been sold.

Home colours	Away colours

== Pre-season ==
Pre-season match details
Date	Opponent	Venue	Result	Score F–A	Scorers	Attendance	Ref.
13 July 2009	Floriana	A	W	1–0 (Note: Match was 45 minutes in duration.)	McAllister 31'		
13 July 2009	Dingli Swallows	A	W	1–0	Esajas 35'		
16 July 2009	Birkirkara	A	D	0–0 (4–5 p)			
16 July 2009	Sliema Wanderers	A	L	0–1			
21 July 2009	Hartlepool United	A	W	2–0	Tudgay 13', France 19'	1,625	
25 July 2009	Hull City	H	D	0–0		5,213	
28 July 2009	Northampton Town	A	W	2–0	Johnson, Jeffers	1,912	
1 August 2009	Blackburn Rovers	H	D	2–2	Sodje, Tudgay	5,579	

== League results ==
=== League results summary ===
Overall								Home						Away					
Pld	W	D	L	GF	GA	GD	Pts	W	D	L	GF	GA	GD	W	D	L	GF	GA	GD
46	11	14	21	49	69	−20	47	8	6	9	30	31	−1	3	8	12	19	38	−19

Last updated: 3 May 2010 03:50 UK.

=== League round by round ===
Round	1	2	3	4	5	6	7	8	9	10	11	12	13	14	15	16	17	18	19	20	21	22	23	24	25	26	27	28	29	30	31	32	33	34	35	36	37	38	39	40	41	42	43	44	45	46
Ground	H	A	A	H	A	H	H	A	H	A	A	H	H	A	A	H	A	H	H	A	A	H	H	A	A	H	A	H	A	H	H	H	A	H	A	A	A	H	H	A	A	H	A	H	A	H
Result	D	D	L	W	W	D	L	L	W	D	L	W	L	L	D	L	D	L	L	L	L	L	D	W	W	W	L	W	L	W	L	L	L	W	L	D	D	D	W	D	D	L	L	D	L	D
Position	7	12	16	11	8	9	11	12	12	13	16	13	15	15	14	14	17	19	20	21	22	22	22	22	21	20	21	19	20	18	19	21	22	22	22	21	20	21	20	19	20	22	22	22	22	22

Updated to match(es) played on 3 May 2010. Source: swfc.co.uk
A = Away; H = Home; W = Win; D = Draw; L = Loss

=== Results ===
Championship match details
Date	Opponent	Venue	Result	Score F–A	Scorers	Attendance	Ref.
8 August 2009	Barnsley	H	D	2–2	Johnson 9', Gray 38'	30,644	
15 August 2009	Peterborough United	A	D	1–1	O'Connor 21'	10,747	
19 August 2009	Newcastle United	A	L	0–1		43,904	
22 August 2009	Scunthorpe United	H	W	4–0	R. Wood 6', Johnson 12', Tudgay 34', Potter 58'	20,215	
29 August 2009	Plymouth Argyle	A	W	3–1	R. Wood 33', Tudgay 72' pen., 90+2'	10,228	
12 September 2009	Nottingham Forest	H	D	1–1	Tudgay 39'	25,270	
15 September 2009	Middlesbrough	H	L	1–3	Varney 2'	21,722	
18 September 2009	Sheffield United	A	L	2–3	Tudgay 46', Esajas 65'	29,210	
26 September 2009	Cardiff City	H	W	3–1	Esajas 4', Varney 48', Clarke 80'	18,959	
29 September 2009	Crystal Palace	A	D	0–0		12,476	
3 October 2009	Derby County	A	L	0–3		30,116	
17 October 2009	Coventry City	H	W	2–0	Purse 4', Clarke 20' pen.	20,026	
20 October 2009	Preston North End	H	L	1–2	Gray 38'	20,882	
23 October 2009	Watford	A	L	1–4	Tudgay 45'	14,591	
31 October 2009	Bristol City	A	D	1–1	Varney 75'	15,005	
7 November 2009	Queens Park Rangers	H	L	1–2	Johnson 13'	19,491	
21 November 2009	Ipswich Town	A	D	0–0		19,636	
28 November 2009	West Bromwich Albion	H	L	0–4		20,824	
5 December 2009	Reading	H	L	0–2		22,090	
8 December 2009	Doncaster Rovers	A	L	0–1		12,825	
12 December 2009	Leicester City	A	L	0–3		22,236	
19 December 2009	Swansea City	H	L	0–2		18,329	
26 December 2009	Newcastle United	H	D	2–2	Varney 14', O'Connor 59'	30,030	
16 January 2010	Barnsley	A	W	2–1	Spurr 3', Johnson 21'	17,844	
19 January 2010	Blackpool	A	W	2–1	Soares 71', Clarke 84'	8,007	
23 January 2010	Peterborough United	H	W	2–1	Tudgay 45', 67'	24,882	
27 January 2010	Scunthorpe United	A	L	0–2		7,038	
30 January 2010	Plymouth Argyle	H	W	2–1	Varney 24', 42'	22,590	
6 February 2010	Nottingham Forest	A	L	1–2	Varney 73'	27,900	
9 February 2010	Blackpool	H	W	2–0	O'Connor 3', Potter 50'	19,058	
16 February 2010	Doncaster Rovers	H	L	0–2		22,252	
20 February 2010	Ipswich Town	H	L	0–1		21,641	
27 February 2010	Reading	A	L	0–5		17,573	
6 March 2010	Leicester City	H	W	2–0	Clarke 6', 61'	21,647	
9 March 2010	West Bromwich Albion	A	L	0–1		20,458	
13 March 2010	Swansea City	A	D	0–0		14,167	
16 March 2010	Preston North End	A	D	2–2	Miller 57', Tudgay 60'	12,311	
20 March 2010	Derby County	H	D	0–0		21,827	
24 March 2010	Watford	H	W	2–1	Nolan 56', Varney 89'	18,449	
27 March 2010	Coventry City	A	D	1–1	Varney 67'	17,608	
3 April 2010	Queens Park Rangers	A	D	1–1	Soares 77'	13,405	
5 April 2010	Bristol City	H	L	0–1		19,688	
10 April 2010	Middlesbrough	A	L	0–1		19,932	
18 April 2010	Sheffield United	H	D	1–1	Potter 41'	35,485	
24 April 2010	Cardiff City	A	L	2–3	Johnson 15', Tudgay 78'	23,304	
2 May 2010	Crystal Palace	H	D	2–2	Clarke 43', Purse 87'	37,121	

== Domestic cups ==
=== FA Cup ===
FA Cup match details
Round	Date	Opponents	Venue	Result	Score F–A	Scorers	Attendance	Ref.
Third round	2 January 2010	Crystal Palace	H	L	1–2	Hill 44' o.g.	8,690	

=== Football League Cup ===
Football League Cup match details
Round	Date	Opponents	Venue	Result	Score F–A	Scorers	Attendance	Ref.
First round	11 August 2009	Rochdale	H	W	3–0	Esajas 19', Johnson 21', 50'	6,696	
Second round	25 August 2009	Port Vale	A	L	0–2		6,667	

== Transfers ==
=== In ===
Date	Position	Player	Previous club	Fee	Ref.
10 May 2009	DF	Darren Purse	Cardiff City	free/released	
21 May 2009	MF	Tommy Miller	Ipswich Town	free/released	

=== Loans in ===
Date from	Position	Player	Club	Date until	Ref.
21 August 2009	FW	Luke Varney	Derby County	1 January 2010	

=== Out ===
Date	Position	Player	New Club	Fee	Ref.
8 May 2009	MF	Kenny Lunt	Hereford United	Released	
8 May 2009	FW	Wade Small	Chesterfield	Released	
6 January 2010	DF	Richard Wood	Coventry City	Undisclosed	

=== Loaned out ===
Date from	Position	Player	Club	Date until	Ref.
18 November 2009	DF	Richard Wood	Coventry City	1 January 2010	
2009	MF	Rocky Lekaj	Sandefjord Fotball	Unknown	

== First-team squad ==
Note: Flags indicate national team as defined under FIFA eligibility rules; some limited exceptions apply. Players may hold more than one non-FIFA nationality.

No.	Pos.	Nation	Player
1	GK	ENG	Lee Grant
2	DF	ENG	Tommy Spurr
3	DF	ENG	Lewis Buxton
4	DF	ENG	Darren Purse (captain)
5	DF	ENG	Richard Hinds
6	MF	ENG	Tommy Miller
7	FW	ENG	Marcus Tudgay
8	MF	ENG	Sean McAllister
9	FW	ENG	Francis Jeffers
11	MF	NED	Etienne Esajas
14	MF	IRL	Darren Potter
15	DF	ENG	Mark Beevers
17	MF	IRL	James O'Connor
18	FW	ENG	Leon Clarke

No.	Pos.	Nation	Player
19	FW	ENG	Luke Varney (on loan from Derby County)
20	DF	USA	Frank Simek
21	DF	ENG	Nick Wood
22	GK	ENG	Richard O'Donnell
23	MF	JAM	Jermaine Johnson
24	MF	ENG	Luke Boden
25	GK	ENG	Arron Jameson
26	DF	ENG	Max Wragg
27	MF	ENG	Callum Harrison
28	FW	ENG	Nathan Modest
29	MF	ENG	Liam Palmer
30	MF	ENG	Tom Soares (on loan from Stoke City)
30	DF	IRL	Eddie Nolan (on loan from Preston North End)
33	MF	ENG	Michael Gray

=== Left club during season ===
Note: Flags indicate national team as defined under FIFA eligibility rules; some limited exceptions apply. Players may hold more than one non-FIFA nationality.

No.	Pos.	Nation	Player
10	FW	ENG	Akpo Sodje (on loan from Charlton Athletic)
12	MF	NOR	Rocky Lekaj (to Lyn)

No.	Pos.	Nation	Player
16	DF	ENG	Richard Wood (to Coventry City)
29	FW	NIR	Warren Feeney (on loan from Cardiff City)
