= The England Band =

Supporters band of the England national football team

The England Band are the official supporters band of the England national football team, from Sheffield and are led by John Hemmingham. They were sponsored by Pukka Pies from 2006 until 2014.

== History ==
The band first performed at England games in 1996 after the then England manager, Terry Venables, and head of The Football Association, David Davies, heard them playing for Sheffield Wednesday fans away at Arsenal and invited them to play at England matches just in time for Euro 96. The band say that they try to learn a song of the opposition and refuse to play anything controversial, for example not playing the Dambusters March when England are playing Germany. In 2008, entertainer Bernie Clifton joined the band.

The band planned to perform at the 2008 Summer Olympics as the "Great Britain Band in Beijing", but they were not permitted to take their instruments into the Birds Nest Stadium. Instead they performed on the streets of Beijing.

At UEFA Euro 2012, the band were not permitted to perform at England's game against France in the Donbas Arena in Donetsk, Ukraine, despite having UEFA approval. The band were allowed to enter the stadium but had their instruments confiscated. However, after an appeal by the FA, the ban was overturned and they were cleared to perform at England's next group game against Sweden.

The band were also forbidden from playing at the 2014 World Cup in Brazil by FIFA, due to strict rules on not allowing instruments into the stadiums.

== Charts ==
The band have also released The Great Escape theme tune as a single for the 1998 FIFA World Cup and a newer version for UEFA Euro 2000. The original peaked in the UK charts at number 46 while the later version reached number 26.

== Criticism ==
The band has been the subject of extensive criticism, mainly levied at them by fellow England fans. They have been referred to as "horrific" and a Twitter account was set up calling for them to be banned, which quickly gained 500 followers. They have also been considered repetitive. Comedian David Baddiel said, "I tire of endless Rule, Britannias and Great Escapes", and is "aware" of the band's refusal to play Three Lions. When the large contingent of Polish fans drowned out the band at Wembley during the final group qualifier for the 2014 World Cup, Guardian journalist Barney Ronay welcomed the fact:

"There had been a fear before kick-off that 18,000 or so Poles would out-sing and out-atmosphere the home support, albeit anything that might drown out the England band, whose parpings and whumpings tend to produce the feeling of being very slowly lulled into semi-consciousness by a dementedly patriotic stage hypnotist, is to be welcomed."

—

After the same game, England fans were quoted in The Guardian as saying that the band are like "the Go Compare advert of international football fans" and that "If 18,000 Polish supporters drown out the England band, they should be invited to every game at Wembley." In 2018, Sean O'Grady in The Independent called for the "tin-eared unworthy musical accompaniment" of this "in-your-face, Sun-front page 'support our boys' gammonesque nationalism" to be banned.
