= Trevor Storer =

British businessman (1930–2013)

- Born: 11 July 1930; Leicester, England
- Died: 31 July 2013 (aged 83)
- Occupation: Founder of Pukka Pies
- Spouse: Valerie Storer
- Children: 3

Trevor Storer (11 July 1930 – 31 July 2013) was a British businessman and founder of the Pukka Pies company in 1963, which was originally called Trevor Storer's Home Made Pies. He was the author of Bread Salesmanship, which became the training manual for Allied Bakeries in the 1960s. Originally making his pies in his own home, he built the company up until retiring at the age of 65, but remained chairman until his death. As of his time of his death, the company turned over £40 million a year.

== Early life ==
Storer was born in Leicester on 11 July 1930. He attended Alderman Newton's School, and after leaving school at the age of sixteen he worked in the family bakery, which had been founded by his grandfather in 1899. Following his National service, which he spent as an instructor at the British Army's bakery school, he rejoined the family firm. In 1960, the company was sold to Allied Bakeries and Storer was persuaded to become a trainee manager. He wrote a book entitled Bread Salesmanship, which was used by Allied as a training manual.

== Pukka Pies ==
He left Allied Bakeries in 1963, and sold his Austin-Healey Sprite to fund the opening of his own company. Initially called Trevor Storer's Home Made Pies, as they were made in his home in Earl Shilton, he sold 1,200 steak and kidney pies in the first week, mainly to pubs. He expanded the range to include chicken and mushroom pies, turning over £12,000 in the first year. In 1964 the company was renamed to Pukka Pies at the suggestion of his wife. She later explained that it was so named as it was a fashionable term at the time and "represented something that was top-notch".

Under Storer's management, the company slowly expanded across the UK and opened a factory in Syston, Leicestershire. He retired in 1995 at the age of 65, but remained chairman of the company. His two sons, Tim and Andrew, took over the day-to-day running of the business as joint managing directors. The company celebrated its 50th anniversary in early 2013, by which time it was selling 60 million pies a year. Storer died at his home on 31 July 2013, survived by his wife, two sons and daughter Susan.
