= Dave Allen (football executive) =

English businessperson

David Easton Dey Allen (born April 1942) is a Sheffield based businessman and ex-chair of the football team Sheffield Wednesday and former owner of Chesterfield F.C. Allen owns a 99.9% share of the A & S Leisure Group which runs Napoleons Casinos across England, as well as the greyhound racing track at Owlerton Stadium in Sheffield.

== Sheffield Wednesday ==
Allen joined the Sheffield Wednesday board in 2000 and eventually became chair in June 2003.

Allen came under severe criticism from some supporters throughout the tenure of manager Paul Sturrock, especially for what was perceived as forcing fan favourites such as Steve MacLean and Jon-Paul McGovern out of the club. The ill-feeling towards Allen hit a new high in October 2006 after the sacking of popular manager Sturrock, with fans attributing a slump in form to the chairman's relationship with the manager and Allen's transfer policy rather than the performance of the manager; this then led to a series of protests by supporters aimed directly at the chairperson and board of directors. However, the appointment of caretaker manager Sean McAuley and his eventual successor Brian Laws did see an improvement in results. Allen was sometimes the basis of much criticism from Wednesday fans, whom he referred to as "scum", "yobs" and "cretins", also labelling one female fan a "venomous bitch" after she voiced her frustration at Allen as he sat in the directors' box at Hillsborough Stadium.

Allen resigned as chair and a director of Sheffield Wednesday on 23 November 2007. Dave Allen continued to own 10% of Sheffield Wednesday FC until December 2010, when he sold his shares to new Owls owner Milan Mandaric.

== Chesterfield ==
In April 2009 it was reported that Allen would invest about £4 million in Chesterfield F.C., while still keeping most of his shares in Sheffield Wednesday, and in 2012 he took over as chairman. The club won the League Two championship in 2014, as well as winning the Football League Trophy in 2012, but in November 2016 he resigned as chairman and director of Chesterfield F.C after two fellow shareholders refused his request to indefinitely write-off interest on their loans. At the end of that season Chesterfield were relegated from League One after finishing in 24th spot. This demotion resulted in a 'push' for promotion back to league one in the following season; Chesterfield were viewed as the favourites, but instead were relegated to the national league after finishing last. This sparked outrage in the club but once again Allen assured fans of a promotion with the appointment of national league specialist Martin Allen, who was sacked a few months from the end of the season with Chesterfield once again in the relegation spots. Allen then recruited former manager John Sheridan, who saved the club from a third relegation in three years, but the following season saw the club battling relegation again.

In 2017 he placed the club up for sale, and in late 2019 he agreed to sell the club to a fans' consortium called the Chesterfield F.C. Community Trust. Shortly after this he was named the U.K.'s worst club owner in a fans' poll.

On 6 August 2020 he formally handed over ownership of the club to the Chesterfield FC Community Trust. It was discovered afterwards that he had removed the £150,000 payment from Leeds in respect to a contract clause prior to doing so.
