= Pukka Pies =

British manufacturer of savoury pies

- Type: Private
- Founded: 1963
- Founder: Trevor Storer and Valerie Storer
- Headquarters: Leicestershire, England
- Key people: Tim and Andrew Storer
- Products: Pies, pasties and sausage rolls
- Number of employees: 360
- Website: pukkapies.co.uk

Pukka Pies is a manufacturer of pies based in Syston, Leicestershire, England.

== Products ==
The company's products include single-serve and sharing pies, sausage rolls, pasties, catering sausages, frozen puff pastry, and non-meat foods, with the Veggie Leek & Potato pie approved by the Vegetarian Society.

According to the company, the favourite pie flavours in the United Kingdom based upon its 2005 sales, were:

Flavour	Popularity
Steak pies (All Steak, Steak & Kidney and Steak & Ale)	56%
Chicken & Mushroom	22%
Minced Beef & Onion	13%
Others (Meat & Potato; Balti; Cheese, Beer & Veal)	9%

A pastiche of Pierre-Auguste Renoir's painting Le Déjeuner des Canotiers hangs in the reception at the headquarters, with the original characters replaced by members of the Storer family.

Pukka Pies are most commonly seen for sale in chip shops, stadiums, butchers, cafes, and pubs across the country. In 2008, the company started selling its pies in UK supermarkets for the customer to heat up at home.

Since 2026; the Select Car Leasing Stadium in Reading has sold Pukka Pies in its stadium.

== History ==
A family company founded in 1963 by Trevor Storer and Valerie Storer as "Trevor Storer's Home Made Pies", it was named Pukka Pies in 1964. Today, the business is called Pukka. It is currently run by the Storers' sons, Tim and Andrew, and employs 360 people at its bakery in Syston, producing 180,000 pies and pasties per day. Millmoor, then the home ground of Rotherham United FC, was the first sporting venue where Pukka Pies were sold. As of 2010, Rotherham United's supporters hold the record for the most pies consumed at a football match, with a consumption 40% above the Football League average.

As of 2025, the company sells approximately 60 million pies a year in the UK and abroad.

== Promotion ==
The main stand at Boundary Park, home of Oldham Athletic AFC, is called the Pukka Pies stand. It is also called the Pukka Pies stand for the main stand of Rotherham's home, New York Stadium. The company was the official sponsor of The England Band, who also play for Sheffield Wednesday.

The company sponsored the 2009 UK Snooker Championship, and the winner, China's Ding Junhui, was awarded his body weight in meat pies, 276 to match his 69 kg weight. He later announced that he would donate all the pies to a charity based in Sheffield that helps the homeless over the festive period.

== See also ==
- Pukka Pies England Band
