= Lee Strafford =

English businessman

Lee Strafford is an English businessman and the former chairman of Sheffield Wednesday F.C., a football club based in Sheffield, South Yorkshire. Strafford is also co-founder of NetStart. He was also co-founder and CEO of the UK ISP PlusNet.

Strafford became chairman of Sheffield Wednesday in 2009. While chairman, he signed a charitable sponsorship deal with Sheffield Children's Hospital. In May 2010, it was announced that Stafford had resigned after the club was relegated from the Football League Championship. Following his resignation, Strafford engaged in a corporate whistle-blowing process, exposing various issues which directly contributed to the club. The club was bought by Milan Mandaric on 14 December 2010. Mandaric's bid was supported by the club's bankers and major creditor, the Co-Operative Bank, in favour of an alternative bid by members of the incumbent board.

Strafford made his name with Sheffield-based Internet provider PlusNet. He took PlusNet from 7 to over 200 employees and from £0 to £100 million market cap. The company was eventually sold to British Telecom for £67 million. During his time as CEO, the business went through three sale processes, 6 years as a reporting segment of Insight Enterprises Inc, a (NASDAQ listed Fortune 500 business), one AIM IPO, two and a half years as a PLC and was eventually sold to BT Group in January 2007. Two months after acquiring Plusnet, British Telecom fired Strafford.

In June 2012 Strafford co-founded Dotforge, a pre-Seed Tech accelerator. Dotforge supports digital start-ups through its programmes which are run primarily in Sheffield.
