= Hillsborough Stadium =

Stadium in Sheffield, England

Hillsborough
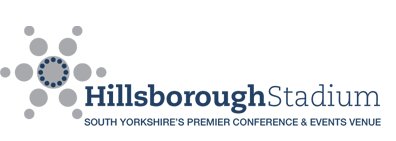

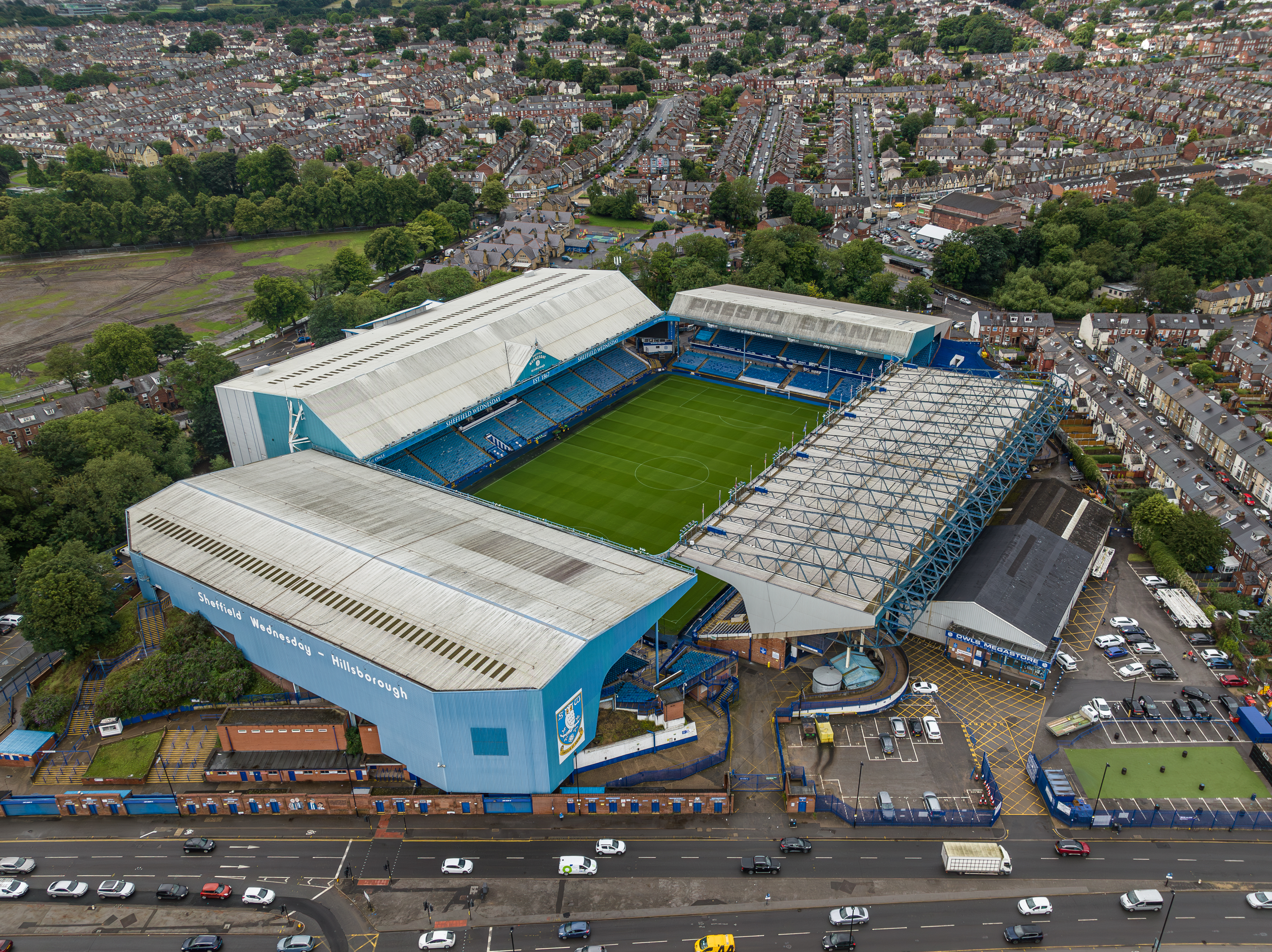
- Interactive map of Hillsborough
- Full name: Hillsborough Stadium
- Former names: Owlerton Stadium (until 1914)
- Location: Owlerton, Sheffield, South Yorkshire, England
- Coordinates: 53°24′41″N 1°30′2″W
- Owner: Hillsborough 1899 Limited, Arise Capital Partners
- Capacity: 39,732 (currently reduced to 34,845)
- Surface: Hero carpet reinforcement
- Record attendance: 72,841 v Manchester City (17 February 1934; FA Cup Quarter-Final)
- Field size: 116 × 75 yards (approx. 106 × 69 m)
- Public transit: Y Leppings Lane

Construction
- Groundbreaking: 1899
- Opened: 2 September 1899

Tenant
- Sheffield Wednesday (1899–present)

Hillsborough Stadium is a football stadium in the area of Owlerton, Sheffield, South Yorkshire, England. With a total capacity of 34,835, it has been the home of Sheffield Wednesday Football Club since opening in 1899.

The ground has been substantially re-developed, with new stands on each side and the original South Stand re-built for UEFA Euro 1996. It has two large two-tiered stands and two large single-tiered stands, all of which are covered. All four stands are of a similar capacity, with the South Stand being the largest and the West Stand (usually housing the away supporters) being the smallest.

The ground was the scene of the Hillsborough disaster on 15 April 1989, in which 97 Liverpool fans were crushed to death at an FA Cup semi-final against Nottingham Forest. The subsequent Taylor Report into the disaster led to a series of long-overdue safety improvements at the ground and other large stadiums around the country, including the requirement for clubs in the top two divisions in England to have all-seater stadiums and the withdrawal of perimeter fencing around the pitch; the latter had only been installed a few years prior to the disaster.

The club's plans to renovate the stadium and expand the capacity to 44,825 have been approved by Sheffield City Council with the aim of hosting World Cup matches. The playing surface was upgraded in 2015 to the Desso GrassMaster system, including a complete replacement of the under-soil heating and drainage systems, while the scoreboard was replaced by a modern 'big screen' prior to the 2015–16 season. The stadium previously played host to World Cup and European Championship football in 1966 and 1996, respectively. In 2025 the old Desso GrassMaster system was completely removed in favour of a HERO Hybrid Grass system, the latest technology in advanced hybrid pitches.

The stadium's capacity has currently been temporarily reduced to 34,845.

== History ==
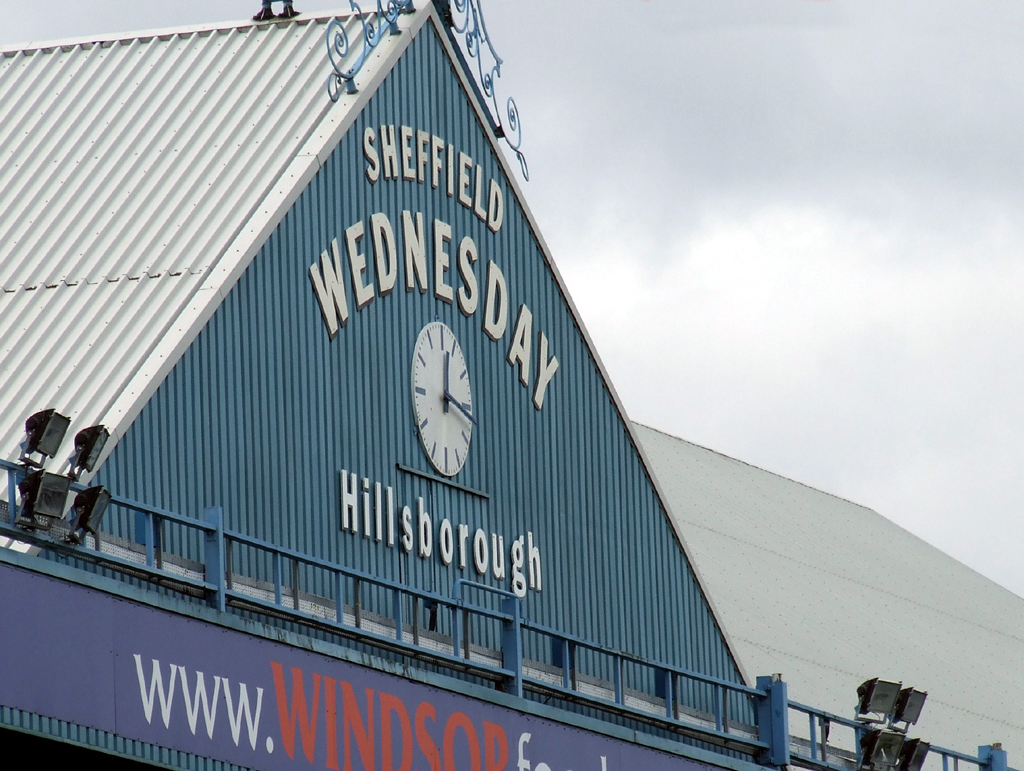
The 124-year-old clock above the current South Stand

During the 1898–99 season Sheffield Wednesday were told that the land rented at Olive Grove would be needed for railway expansions. They were allowed to remain there for the rest of that season but had to find a new ground for the next season. Several locations were considered but fell through for various reasons. An alternative was offered by the Midland Railway Company but it did not meet the requirements of the club.

Finally James Willis Dixon of Hillsborough House, owner of the Silversmiths James Dixon & Sons, offered a 10-acre (4.0 ha) site at Owlerton, a sparsely populated area of land to the northwest of the city. The land was part of the Hillsborough House estate which was being sold off by the Dixons. It was successfully bought for £5,000 plus costs. The soil was dumped at both ends of the ground to level out the ground which was initially meadowland covered with dandelions. The 2,000 capacity stand at Olive Grove was then transported to the new site and was joined by a newly built 3,000 capacity stand for the start of the next season. The first match to be played was on 2 September 1899 against Chesterfield. The match was kicked off by the Lord Mayor of Sheffield William Clegg, himself a former Wednesday player. It was a Chesterfield player, Herbert Munday, who scored the first goal at the new stadium but Wednesday came back to win the game 5–1. Despite the location of the ground several miles outside the city boundaries and a poor public transport service the new ground averaged 3,000 supporters for the first three months. One of the main contractors for the building of the ground was "Derby Joe Mills". The club could not afford to pay Mills, so he was given shares. Joe's son, Herman Henry Mills (commonly known as " Herman the German" because Herman's mother was a distant and poor relation of the Krupp family) threw away the shares more than 50 years ago, having assumed that they were worthless).

=== Early years ===
The ground was known as the Owlerton Stadium until 1914, when it was renamed Hillsborough to coincide with a series of ground improvements. The ground took its new name from the newly created parliamentary constituency. The ground proved to be lucky for Wednesday with the first 8 years proving to be their most successful so far. They included their first league wins in the 1902–03 and 1903–04. This was followed by a second FA Cup in 1907.

The first FA Cup semi-final to be held at the stadium was a replay between West Bromwich Albion and Blackburn Rovers on 3 April 1912. A crowd of 20,050 saw an extra time goal give West Brom the win. This was followed by its first international on 10 April 1920. A match between England and Scotland was watched by 25,536. The game ended with England winning 5–4. The following two seasons saw Hillsborough host two more FA Cup semi-finals, both between Preston North End and Tottenham Hotspur. The crowds for these matches were 43,320 and 49,282 respectively. The highest ever attendance was 72,841 on 17 February 1934 for an FA Cup 5th-round game against Manchester City.

After the end of the 1912–13 season a record profit was announced by the club. The money was invested in a replacement for the Olive Grove stand on the south side of the stadium. The banking on the Spion Kop was also increased in size. The new south stand was completed in time for the first round of the FA Cup on 1 October 1913 against Notts County. It cost £18,000 and included 5,600 seats plus terracing at the front. New offices, dressing rooms, refreshment rooms and a billiard room were also part of the new stand. The second round tie went to a replay on 4 February 1914, which was held in front of a record home crowd of 43,000. However the match was remembered for the collapse of the new retaining wall at the Penistone Road end. It caused 70 injuries and caused the match to be suspended while the casualties were taken to the infirmary.

=== Postwar ===
During the postwar era, Hillsborough rose to be one of the top stadia in the country. It hosted 27 FA Cup semi-finals. In 1966, the stadium was one of the venues for the Football World Cup, hosting first-round matches involving West Germany, Argentina, Switzerland, and Spain, as well as a quarterfinal in which West Germany beat Uruguay 4–0.

Demolition of the North Stand began in 1960 and work began on a new £150,000 stand. The new stand, designed by local firm Husband & Co, was 360 feet (110 m) in length. It was only the second stand in the country, after one at Scunthorpe United's Old Showground, to be built with a cantilever roof and the first to run the full length of the pitch. It was opened on 23 August 1961 by Stanley Rous, secretary of the Football Association. The 10,008 capacity all-seater stand almost doubled the seating capacity of Hillsborough from 9,000 to 16,000.

The ground held its first national cup final in 1977 when it played host to Everton and Aston Villa for a Football League Cup final replay. A crowd of 52,135 watched a 1–1 draw leading to another replay. At the end of the 1980s, the ground held three successive FA Cup semi-finals, ending with the events that changed the nature of football grounds throughout the country.

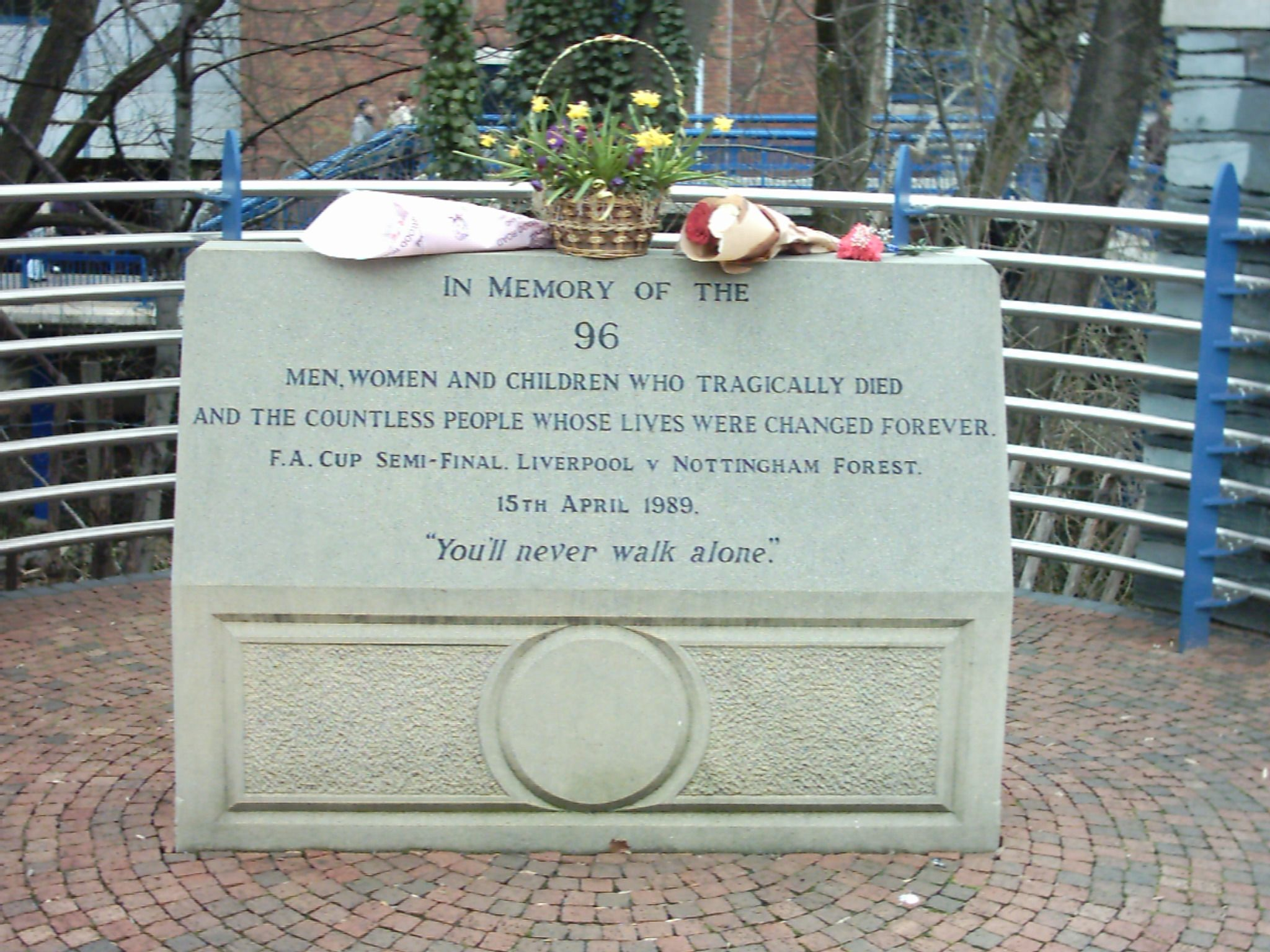
The memorial across the river from the South Stand and main entrance

=== Hillsborough disaster ===
On 15 April 1989, the ground was the scene of the worst tragedy in English sporting history when Liverpool faced Nottingham Forest in an FA Cup semi-final. During the match, 96 Liverpool fans were crushed to death. Official investigations criticised Sheffield Wednesday for not acting upon previous incidents (especially the 1981 FA Cup semi-final) that had shown the potential for crushing at Hillsborough. The Leppings Lane end of the ground did not hold a valid safety certificate; it had not been updated since 1979.

The recommendations of the Taylor Report led to a series of improvements to safety at grounds across the United Kingdom. The terraces at Hillsborough were converted to all seated accommodation over the following four years, and the fences around the pitch were replaced with low safety-barricades to allow incursion onto the playing surface in case of emergency.

==== Memorial ====
Outside the ground, near the main entrance on Parkside Road, is a memorial to the 96 fans that lost their lives at Hillsborough in 1989, during the FA Cup semi-final between Liverpool and Nottingham Forest. The memorial was unveiled on the tenth anniversary of the tragedy, 15 April 1999. It reads: In memory of the 96 men, women, and children who tragically died and the countless people whose lives were changed forever. FA Cup semi-final Liverpool v Nottingham Forest. 15 April 1989. "You'll never walk alone." The memorial suffered minor damage in the Hillsborough Flood; however, it was easily and swiftly repaired.

=== All-seater era ===
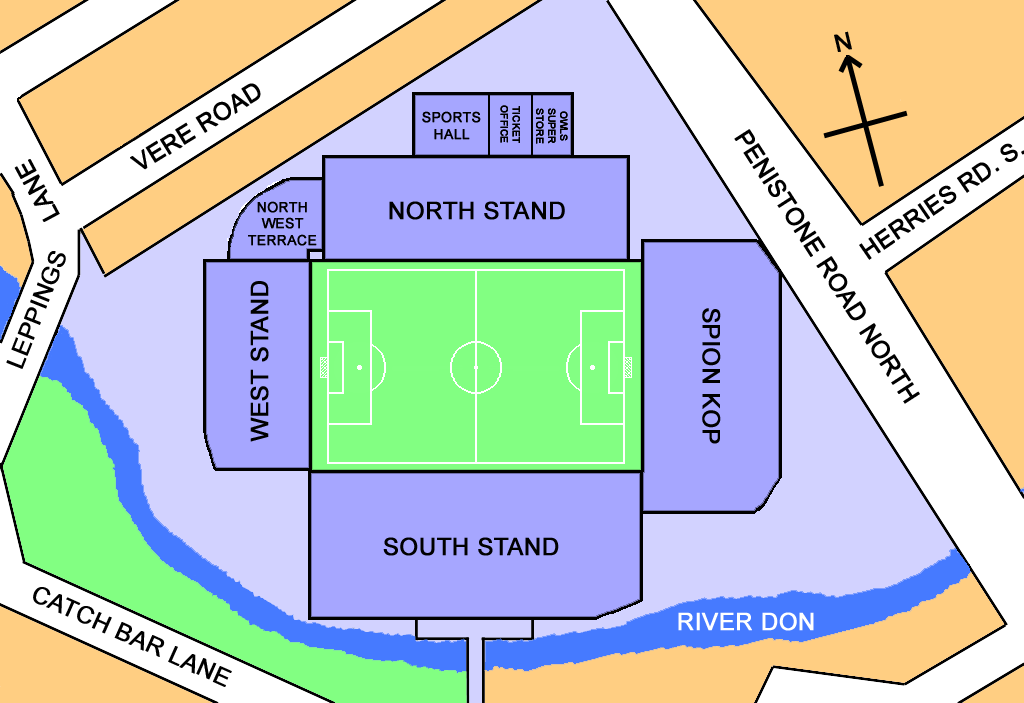
Plan of Hillsborough and the surrounding area

In 1996, Hillsborough was host to several fixtures at the Euro 96 competition and in particular was host to the Danish squad. The Danish fans endeared themselves to the local population with their fanatical support and exemplary behaviour, and were particularly popular among local landlords—a number of Sheffield public houses had to order emergency supplies of beer and cigarettes.

In 1997 Hillsborough hosted the League Cup Final replay between Leicester City and Middlesbrough, won by Leicester 1–0. Later the same year Middlesbrough returned to Hillsborough for an FA Cup semi-final replay, in which they beat Chesterfield 3–0.

The record attendance since the ground was made all-seated was on 2 February 2000 in a Premier League game against Manchester United watched by 39,640 fans. In recent years, average attendances at Hillsborough have remained high relative to the lower leagues they have participated in:

- 2015–16: 22,641 (Football League Championship)
- 2016–17: 27,129 (EFL Championship)
- 2017–18: 25,995 (EFL Championship)
- 2018–19: 24,429 (EFL Championship)
- 2019–20: 23,773 (EFL Championship)
- 2020–21: 0 (EFL Championship)
- 2021–22: 22,470 (EFL League One)
- 2022–23: 25,378 (EFL League One)
- 2023–24: 26,762 (EFL Championship)
- 2024–25: 26,636 (EFL Championship)
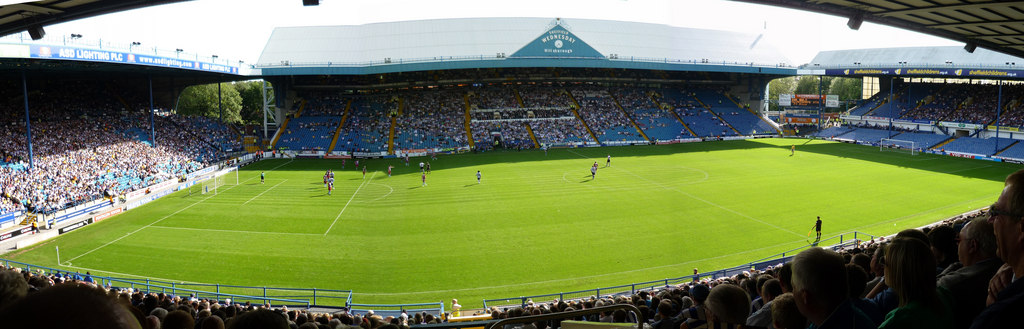
Panorama of Hillsborough Stadium in 2009

=== Hillsborough flood ===
On 25 June 2007, the River Don burst its banks during a period of severe weather in the area and the whole ground was flooded with several feet of water. Changing rooms, restaurants and kitchens, offices and superstore were all affected, with repairs costing millions of pounds. The clean-up effort took months, although Sheffield Wednesday fixtures were only slightly affected as the floods occurred in the close season. A memorial to the floods was unveiled on 25 June 2008 under the South Stand.

== Stands and other structures ==
=== North Stand ===
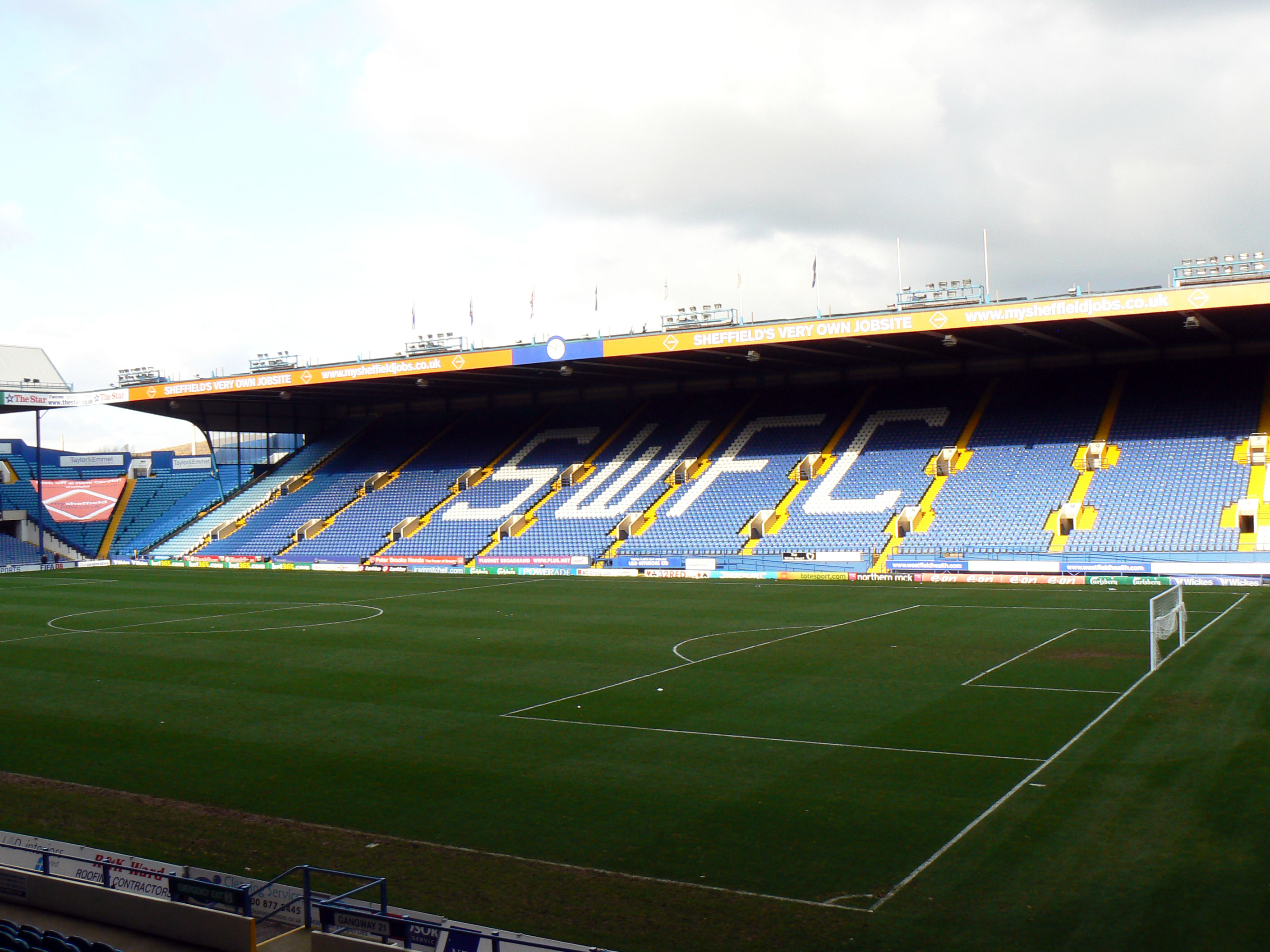
The North Stand (Cantilever) at Hillsborough

The original North Stand was built in 1899–1903 and the current stand was built in 1960–61. It has a capacity of 9,255 seated. The current sponsor for 2018–19 is Chansiri.

The North Stand is the third largest stand at the ground, running along the north side of the pitch.

The original North Stand was built between 1899 and 1903. It was unique at the time, as it had facilities for both men and women, and a slight semicircle which gave a good view of the pitch at any angle (though the supporting pillars did cause some obstruction). The area at the front of the stand was a grass bank until the early 1900s when it was made into a terrace. The stand was joined to the original North West Terrace until the late 1950s when the club decided to build a brand new stand. The current North Stand was opened in 1961. It is only the second football stand in Britain to have a cantilever roof. Hence some fans know it as 'the cantilever'. It was the first stand in the country to run the entire length of the pitch. The first cantilever stand in English football at Scunthorpe United's Old Show Ground only covered the centre of the pitch. Following the formal opening of the stand in August 1961, a celebration match was played on 22 October 1961 when Wednesday met Santos of Brazil with their new star Pele in the team. Pele's goal helped Santos to a 4–2 win. When opened, the stand held 10,000 but the capacity has been reduced more recently to make room for spectators with disabilities and also to widen the exit aisles for safety.

The architectural critic Sir Nikolaus Pevsner called the cantilever stand "interesting and unexpected". This is the only mention of a football ground in his Buildings of England series of architectural guides. The opinion of Simon Inglis, an historian of sports and architecture, is: "There is not a misplaced line in this remarkable stand. From any angle (it) is quite breathtaking. It is like an architect's model from the 1950s of the dream stand of the future, a space age stand."

On 29 July 2025, Sheffield City Council issued a prohibition notice, reducing the North Stand's capacity to 0.

=== West Stand (Leppings Lane End) ===
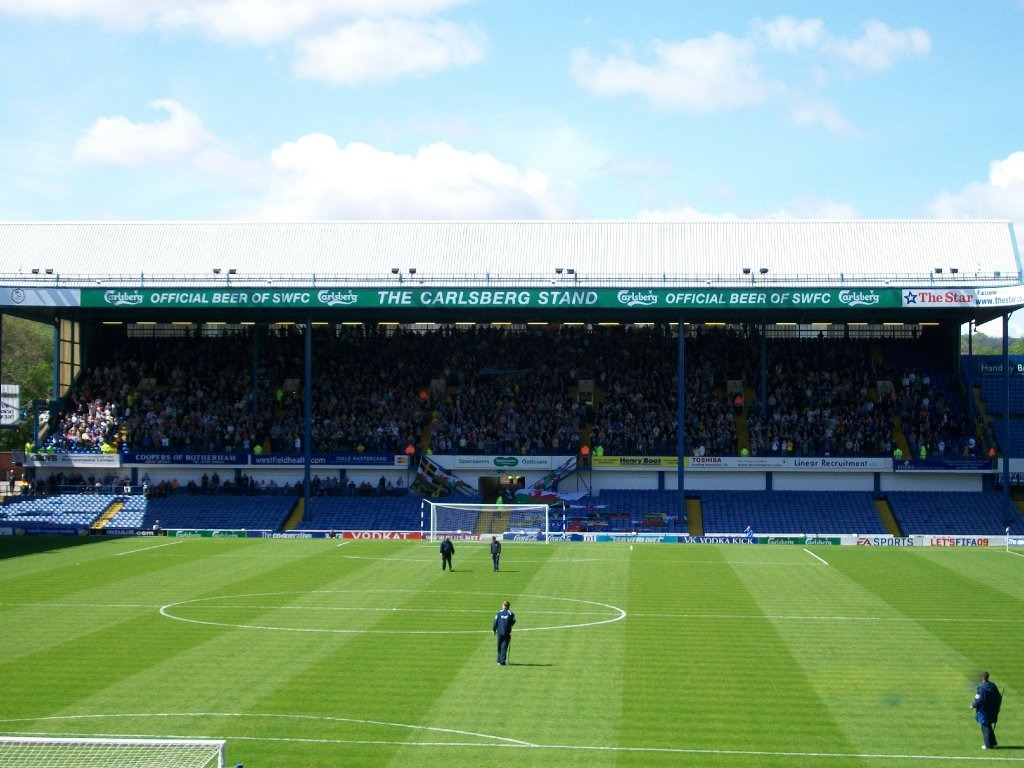
Hillsborough West Stand (Leppings Lane end)

The original west stand was built around 1900 and the current stand was built in 1961–65 with a capacity of 6,658 seated.

The West stand houses the visiting supporters at Hillsborough on match days. It is a two tier structure with 2,494 seats in the lower half, and 4,164 seats in the upper enclosure. The stand is adjoined to the North West Corner which has now had its seats removed and covered with tarpaulin. This stand has not been used for fans since the 2012 2–0 win over Wycombe Wanderers, and most recently has been used as a base for Sky Sports when matches are broadcast

The original stand, built at the turn of the 20th century, was a covered terrace housing up to 3,000 fans. In the 1920s this was joined by the North West terrace, before the Leppings Lane stand was replaced by a 12,000 capacity partially covered terrace. Before the 1966 World Cup the West Stand was demolished again and completely replaced by a two-tiered structure with 4,471 seats in the upper tier and retaining a standing terrace in the lower tier.

After the Hillsborough disaster in 1989 the lower tier terrace was closed for two years and its fencing covered with blue tarp for the remainder of the 1988–89 season. The terrace remained closed and out of use for 1989–90, and its fences were removed entirely prior to the 1990–91 season. The lower tier terrace was converted to 2,294 seats and was re-opened prior to the start of the 1991–92 season. The North West Corner was the last section of the stand to be made all seated, adding another 1,337 seats to the existing structure. The old wooden seats in the upper tier were replaced with bigger plastic ones in 1997. During the 2012–13 season the first row of seats was removed from the lower tier, after an incident involving Leeds United supporters when a minor pitch invasion took place. In the summer of 2013 small gates were installed at the front of the gangways for emergency access to the pitch.

On 7 January 2023, an FA Cup tie with Newcastle United was marred by a failure of crowd management. The council announced a further reduction in capacity following a review of this event.

=== South Stand ===
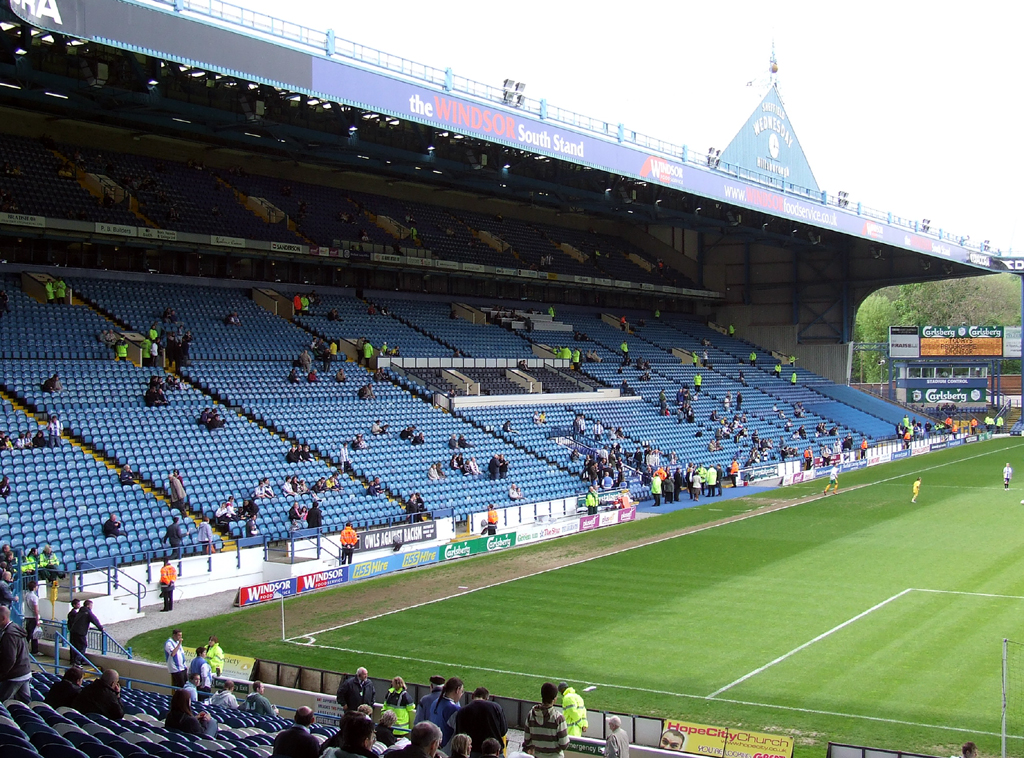
The South Stand starting to fill up for the last match of the 2006–07 season

The original South Stand was built in 1899–1903 and the current stand was built in 1913–15 and extended in 1995. The total stand capacity is 11,352 (all-seater).

The largest stand at Hillsborough situated on the banks of the river Don. It has a large lower tier with 8,275 seats (including the directors box) and an upper tier known as the 'Grand Stand' with 3,077 seats. The nearest four blocks of seating to the east on the Upper tier are used as the club's Family enclosure. The first South Stand was first built at Olive Grove, but moved with the club in the summer of 1899 to the new site at Owlerton where it was rebuilt brick by brick. The clock was also moved to Hillsborough. The modern stand, the oldest remaining stand at the ground, was built between 1913 and 1915 for a fee exceeding £17,000 to a design by Archibald Leitch. The stand had 5,600 seats as well as room for 11,000 standing fans. The clock was salvaged from the old stand and put on the new one.

The modern stand has seen a series of improvements, the first being a conversion to an all-seated stand in 1965 ahead of the 1966 FIFA World Cup and latest being a major £7 million re-development for the Euro 1996 international competition when an upper tier (Grandstand) of 3,077 extra seats, a new roof, 30 executive boxes, two conference suites, a bar, a restaurant and a range of office space were added. Again, the clock was saved and put on the new stand. The South Stand still bears the original clock face and finial from the very first stand, which was brought from Olive Grove. The stand houses the main reception, media and hospitality boxes, Press box, Television gantry, as well as the ground's family enclosure, five modern refreshment kiosks and four bars. It also features concourse television sets relaying live coverage of the match as well as highlights at half-time. The team changing room and dug-outs are also situated here.

=== Spion Kop ===
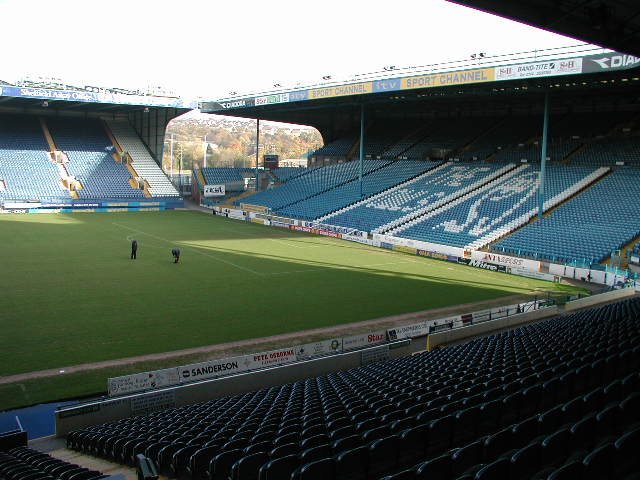
The large spion kop stand at Hillsborough

Spion Kop was built in 1914 with a capacity of 11,210 (seated). In common with several large terraces at English football grounds, it was given this name by supporters, after a hill that was the scene of a battle in the Second Boer War. The Spion Kop is built into a natural hill at the east end of the ground and houses the most vocal of Wednesday's supporters. It is usually simply referred to by fans as The Kop. In 1914 concrete terracing was installed on the bank, which was further extended in 1927. The final expansion of the hill came in 1954. The stand remained open to the elements until a roof was added in 1986 after fans raised money to contribute to the cost. When the roof was added, the stand was 'squared' off to make it symmetrical so that the roof was used fully. Due to this, the Kop was extended, so the capacity rose from 16,000 to 22,000.

After the Hillsborough disaster in 1989, the stand's blue fences were at first retained. However, for the 1989–90 season, the gates allowing egress to the pitch were painted white and kept open throughout all matches, including the Steel City derby on 21 November 1989. The Kop was the last part of the Wednesday ground to be converted to all-seater accommodation, the change finally coming in 1993 to comply with new FA Premier League regulations following the Taylor Report. The capacity was hence halved, but the Kop remains one of the largest single tier stands in Britain. A large concourse area was added in 2004, partially funded by the Owls Trust.

=== North West Corner ===
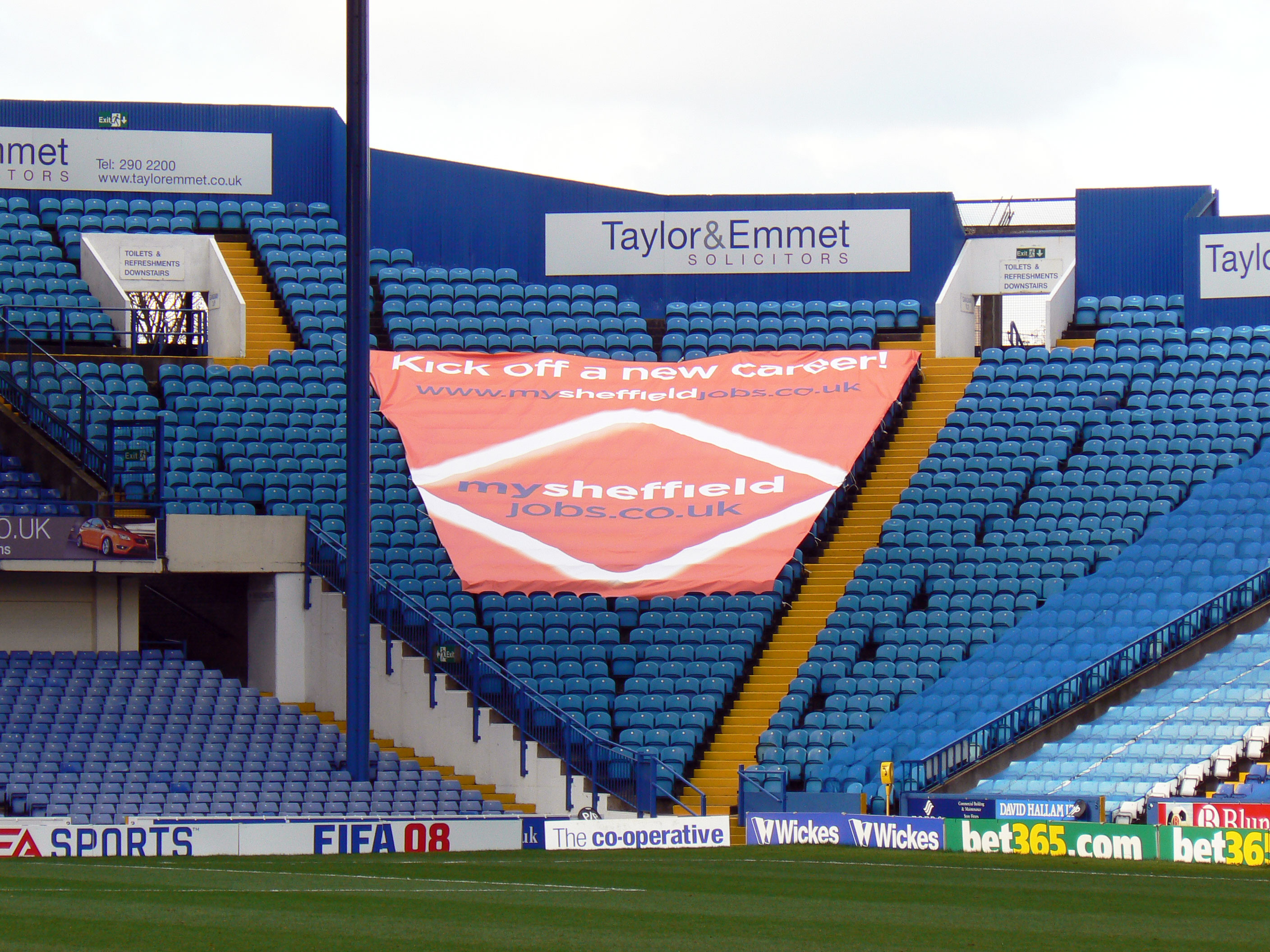
The North-West Corner at Hillsborough

North West Corner was originally built in 1919–20 and the current stand was built in January 1965 – May 1966. The North West Corner, or North West terrace as it is sometimes still referred to, despite now being all seated is the only major section of the stadium to remain uncovered (the other area is the Kop Corner). The original North West Terrace was built between 1919 and 1920 to adjoin both the North Stand and West Stand, but was demolished in early 1965 and replaced in mid 1966, in time for the 1966 World Cup. The terrace was not in use for two years, and seats were installed in 1991 along with the Leppings Lane terrace. The stand failed to gain a safety certificate for the 2007–08 season. In recent years it had only been used as overspill for away fans when both the upper and lower tiers of the West Stand have been filled, however in the 2011–12 season, with Wednesday needing to better or match the result of their neighbours to gain promotion on the final day of the season, the Corner was opened to visiting Wycombe Wanderers fans, with the West Stand used by home supporters. Whilst not being used for seating, the Corner has recently been used as extra advertising space, with advertising boards on the back wall, and more recently a large 'My Sheffield Jobs' seat covering appearing alongside their sponsorship of the North Stand. It is sponsored by Handley Brown. This corner is to be roofed, under the Hillsborough stadium Upgrade plans, yet no work has yet been done, due to owners of the nearby terraces complaining. This corner is commonly nicknamed the 'Crows Nest' by Wednesdayites. The corner is still unable to gain a safety certificate and remains unused by fans. Television company Sky use the corner for their temporary studios and technical area for televised games. Prior to the start of the 2021–22 season, the club removed the seats from the terrace, suggesting that the club have officially mothballed the corner for the foreseeable future.

=== Kop Corner ===
Kop Corner was built in 1986 with a capacity of 400 (though this 400 is included in the overall Spion Kop capacity of 11,210).

The Kop Corner is a small filling section which is adjoined to the Main Spion Kop. It is the second largest area of the ground to remain uncovered, after the North West Corner. This corner is usually just referred to as part of the Spion Kop, as is its capacity, and it is rare to see it referred to as a separate area. The Kop Corner was a lot larger before the installation of the Spion Kop roof in 1986, but a crane was needed to lift the roof, and the Kop Corner was destroyed so the crane could get in. Part of the corner was rebuilt, which is the present day area. Seats were installed in 1993 to correspond with the Taylor report, as was the rest of the Kop. This area was to be extended, and fully filled in under Sheffield Wednesday's ground renovation plans. The corner is well known amongst Wednesdayites as the location of Paul Gregory, aka 'Tango Man' on match days, along with his 'Wolverhampton Owls' flag and is often referred to as 'Tango's corner' by the Wednesdayites.

=== South West Corner (stadium control area) ===
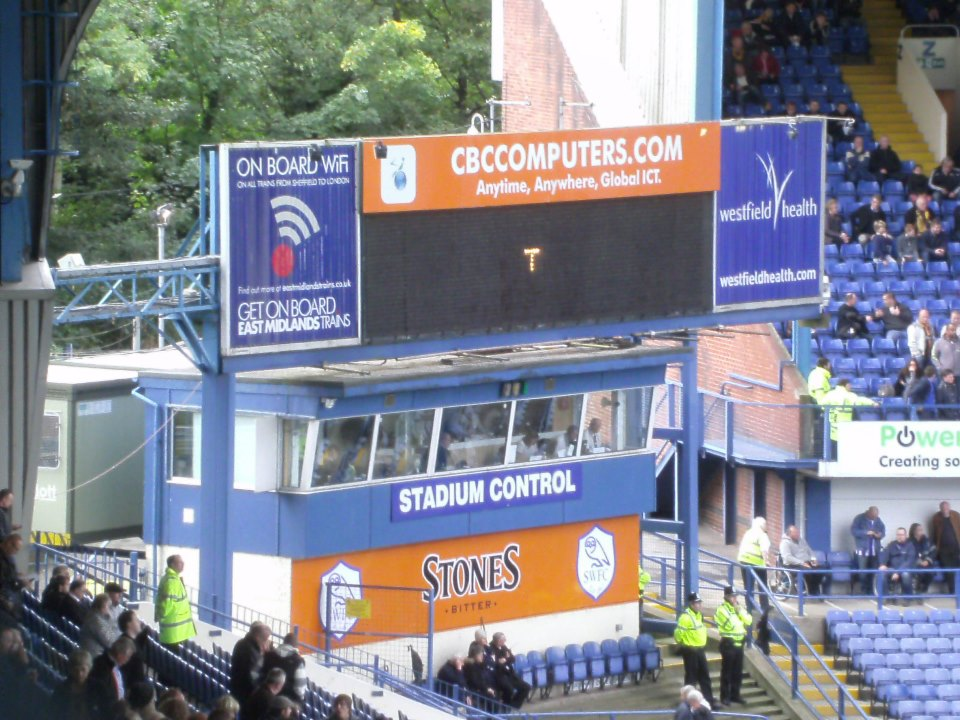
The Hillsborough scoreboard, showed displaying the "T-fault"

The stadium control area is in the southwest area of the ground, between the South and West stands. The most dominant feature is the video scoreboard. The current scoreboard was installed in May 2015 and replaced an older electronic dot-matrix style electronic scoreboard.

The old electronic scoreboard was one of the first electric scoreboards in an English football ground, installed in 1991 in time for the 1991–92 season. For the majority of the match, this showed the score and time, but as of the 2011–12 season, the board showed advertisements every few minutes. Before and after the match, information like team line-ups, fixtures, and other results were shown. The scoreboard had become somewhat of a cult icon of Hillsborough Stadium and Sheffield Wednesday as a whole, loved by the fans for its retro looks and "T-fault", where a series of lights making a T shape light up between animations due to a wiring fault, which had not been fixed on purpose by the club both as a joke and also because of its love by the fans. One of the most popular "T-fault" situations was when announcing the score of fierce rivals Sheffield United – the scoreboard displayed "Shhhhhhhh...", then, after a brief pause, "T", and only then did it announce the score.

Below the scoreboard is the stadium control building, where all the technical aspects of the stadium are controlled (e.g. lighting, announcements, CCTV). At the base of the area is a very small section of disused terrace, which has still not been converted to seating. It is only used as a congregation area for the police and stewards, and has not held fans since the 1989 Hillsborough disaster.

=== Owls Megastore and Ticket Office ===
The Owls Megastore is the official Sheffield Wednesday club shop, underneath the North Stand. It sells all the merchandise, and also the tickets for matchdays. It and the neighbouring ticket office were severely damaged in the Hillsborough Flood. The wall separating the ticket office and club shop was subsequently demolished, and a much larger Owls Megastore opened a few months later, with the ticket office now in one of the corners of the shop. Before the re-development, the Owls Megastore was two-storey, but it has now been changed to one.

=== Hillsborough Stadium Footbridge ===
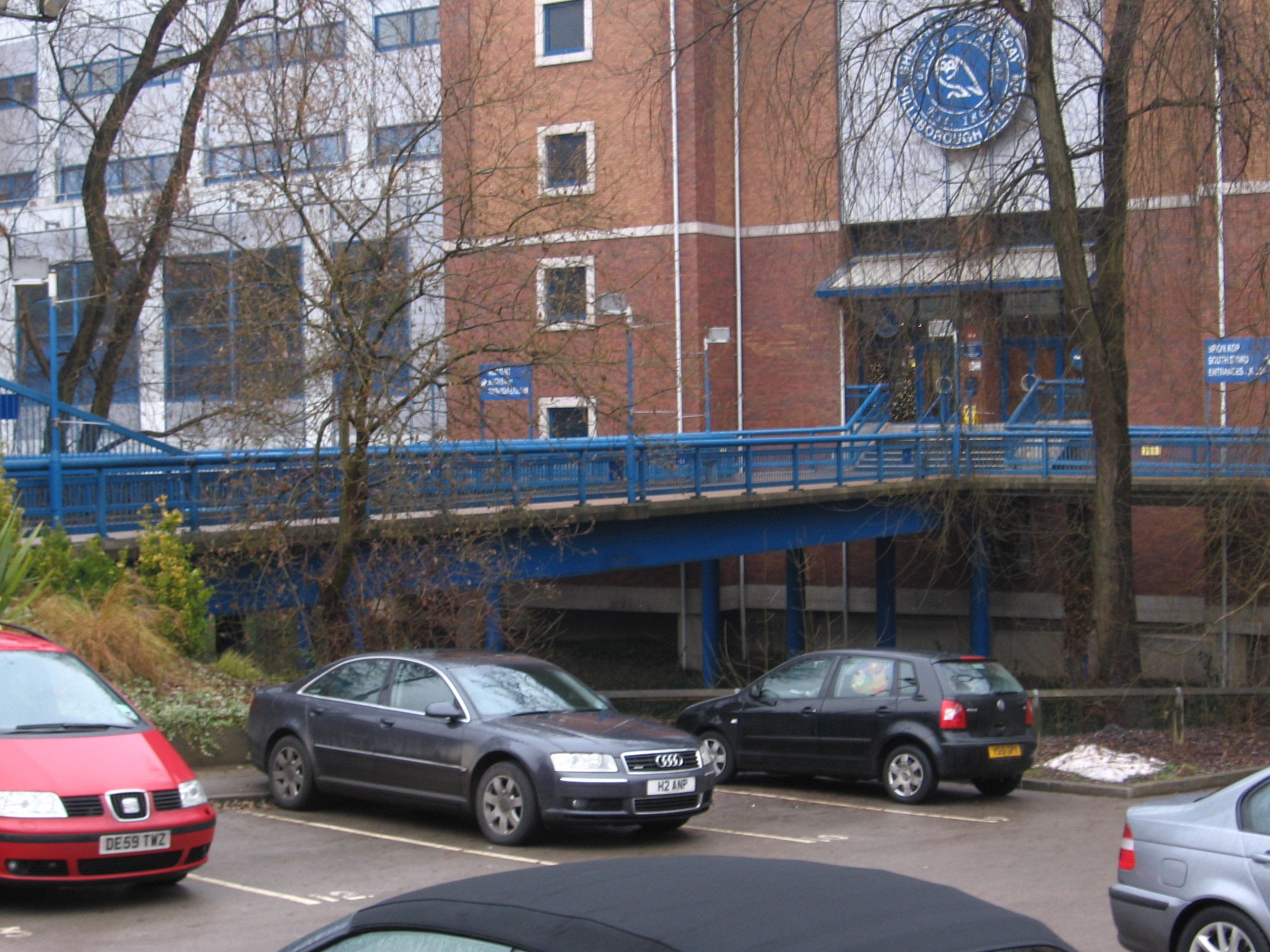
Hillsborough Stadium Footbridge

A bridge was built across the River Don in 1996, to provide access to the refurbished South Stand, ahead of Euro 96. It connects Parkside Road and the surrounding area to the main entrance to Hillsborough Stadium.

=== Dooley's Restaurant, Sheridan Suite, and other South Stand internal facilities ===
Several restaurants, such as Dooley's and the Sheridan Suite, are under the South Stand. Other areas include the 1867 Lounge, various bars, and a wide range of office space. Board rooms, meeting halls and business suites are also here.

== Location ==
Hillsborough Stadium (Sheffield)

The stadium is located in the north west of the city roughly three miles from the city centre. The area is mainly residential with a number of shops and a shopping centre located at nearby Hillsborough Corner. Views of the area can be enjoyed from hills located to the west.

The stadium is sandwiched between Hillsborough Park to the south and terrace housing to the north. The River Don also runs alongside the stadium to the south. The Spion Kop backs straight onto Penistone Road, a major dual carriageway leading to the city centre, while there is some space between the West Stand and Leppings Lane.

== Upgrade works ==
=== 2017 ===
Sheffield Wednesday did not secure promotion to the Premier League in the 2015–16 season, and so some of the long-term upgrade plans have been delayed. However, in July 2017 some upgrade and improvement works commenced with completion before the first league home game in August 2017. Upgrades include an increase in the congregation area at the rear of the Kop and installation of a new bar at the rear of the Kop. A new printed banner was added over the Leppings Lane face of the West Stand. A new fire suppression systems in all concourse Kiosk. Addition of LED Perimeter boards. During the 2015–16 season the club installed a completely new EPOS system on the concourses.

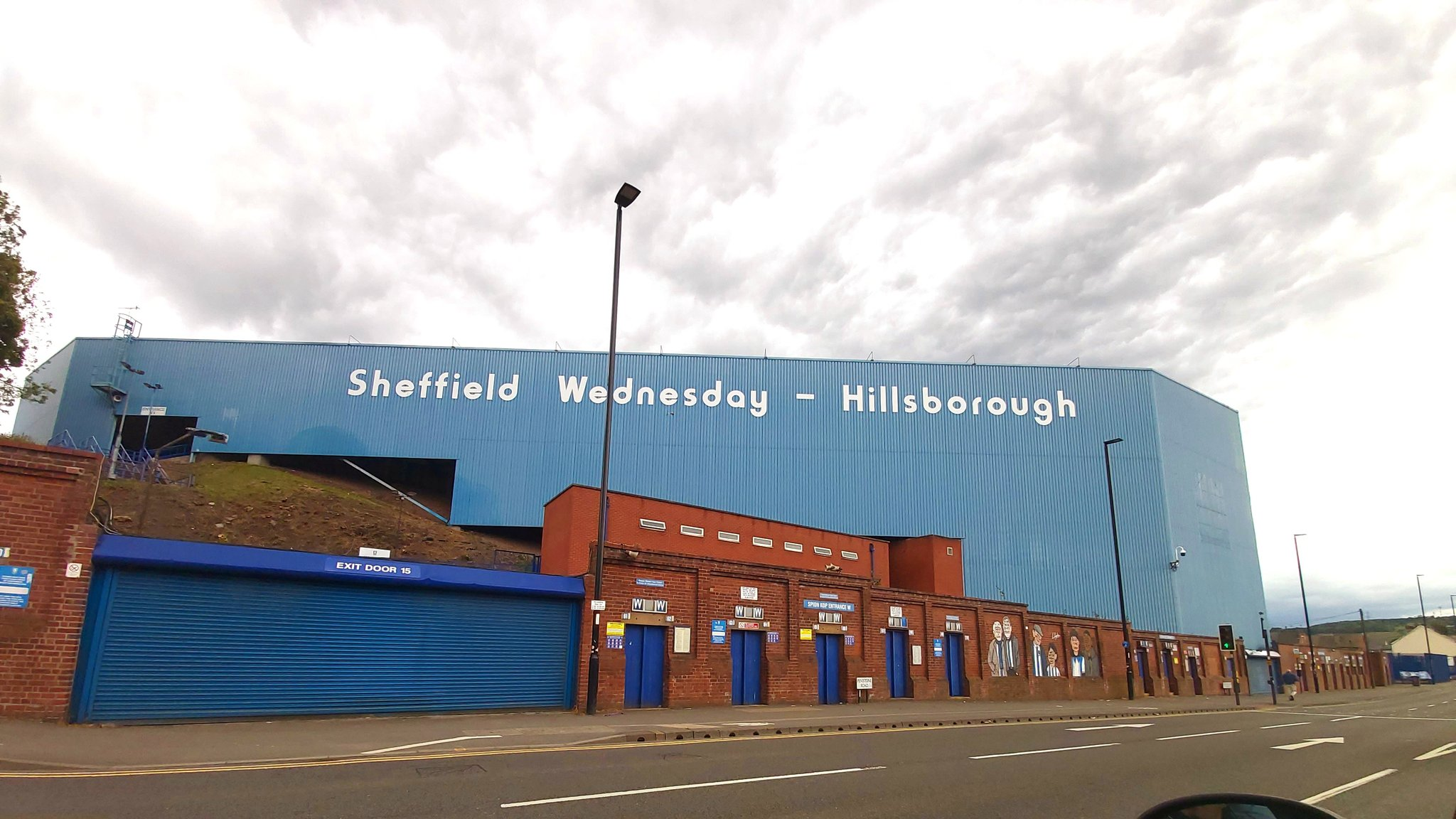
The front of Hillsborough Stadium, 2024

=== Plans ===
Sheffield Wednesday announced in the summer of 2009 plans for a £22 million upgrade of the stadium and an increase in capacity to 44,825 from the current 39,732 with no viewing restrictions. These plans were to be completed by 2013 and would bring the stadium up to FIFA standards for hosting World Cup matches.

==== Work updates ====
Work has not started as of November 2018 with no confirmation on when, or even if, it will start. Planning permission was granted for the entire scheme on 20 October 2009 but due to England not winning the World Cup 2018 bid, redevelopment has been put on hold.

In 2022, Sheffield Wednesday replaced its floodlighting system with the Modus S1500 from Midstream Lighting. The new LED floodlights were installed on the North and South stands of Hillsborough, delivering a higher standard of lighting that met the requirements for both League One and the Championship. The previous lighting system, which had been in place since the 1990s, utilised approximately 168 floodlights. The installation of the new system included 60 LED floodlights and a Light show feature, significantly enhancing the matchday experience for fans.

Graffiti artist Luke Horton has been adding new paintings of Wednesday fans outside the walls on the stadium, with each faceless character having football sayings in the Yorkshire dialect being added over their face.

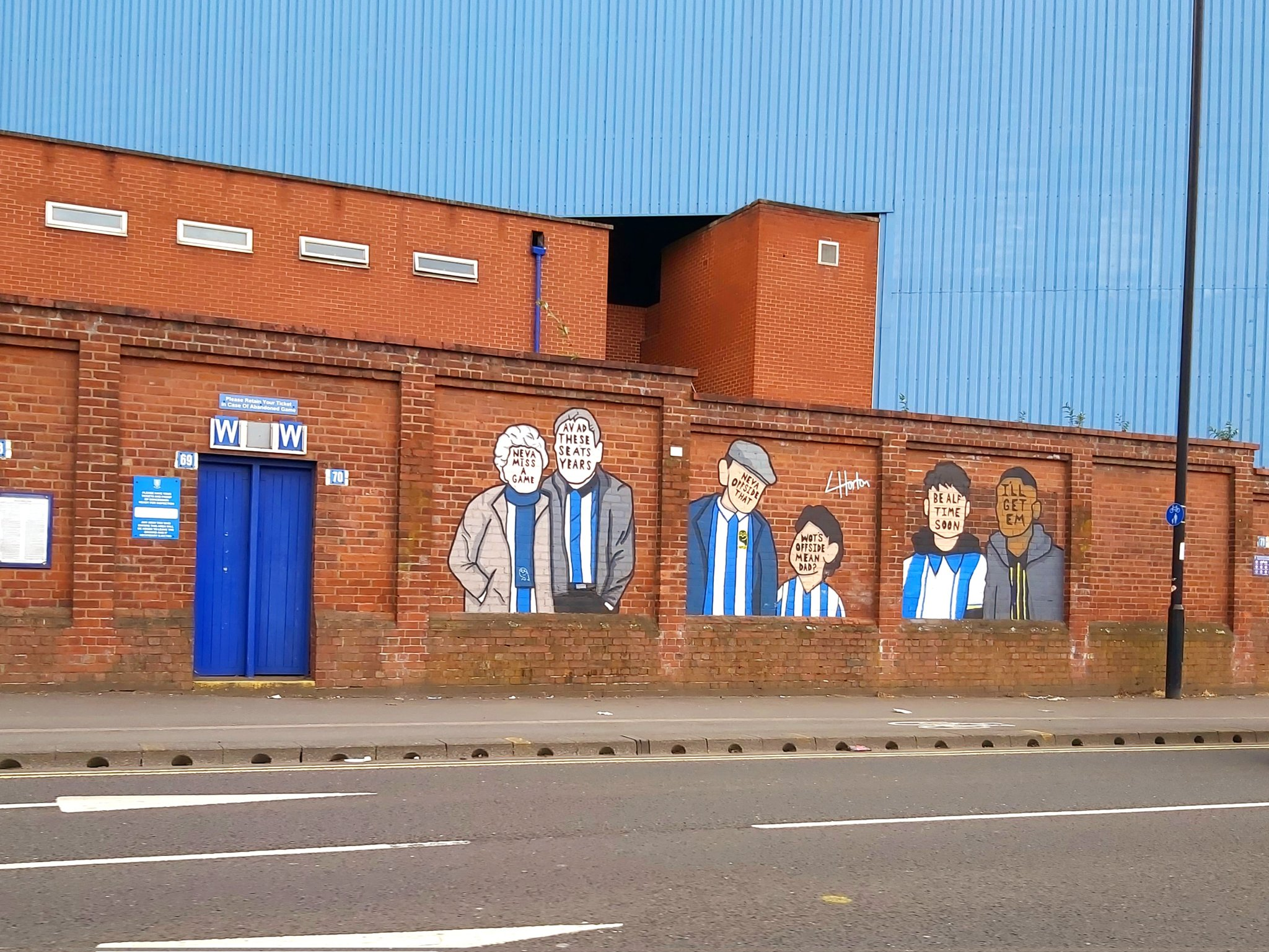
Wall art by Luke Horton

== Records ==
The highest attendance recorded at Hillsborough was in the FA Cup fifth round on 17 February 1934. A total of 72,841 turned up to see a 2–2 draw with Manchester City. The highest attendance recorded since work to convert the stadium to an all-seater venue was completed in 1993 was for a Premier League match against Manchester United on 2 February 2000. The game was watched by 39,640 fans.

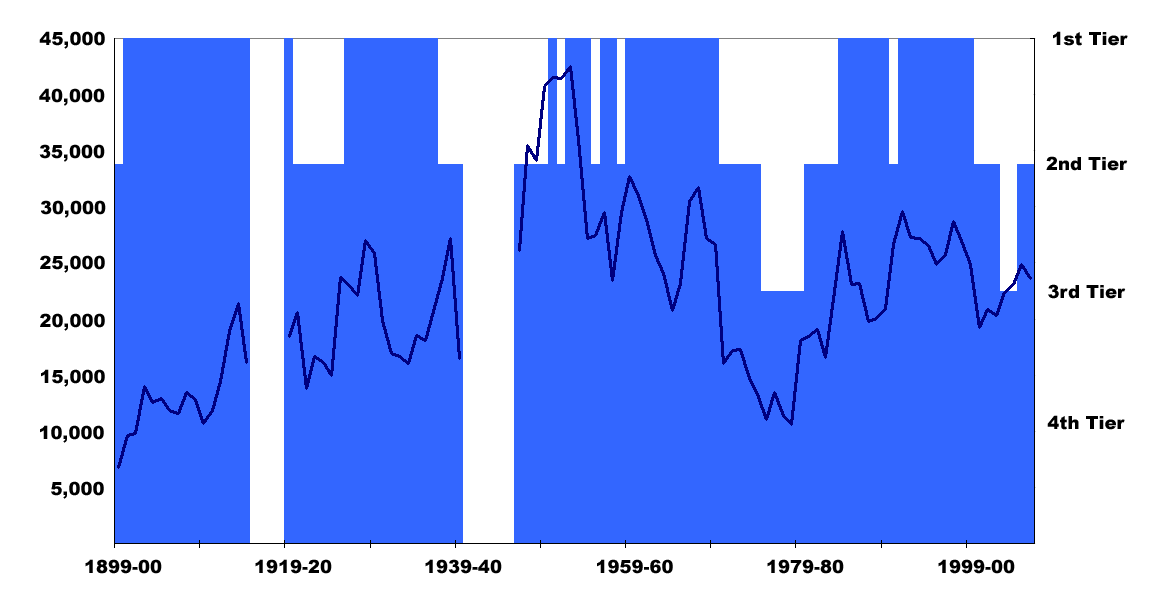
Average home league attendances since Sheffield Wednesday moved to Hillsborough in the 1899–1900 season, shown with the tier of league football that the team were competing in at the time.

The highest seasonal average attendance at Hillsborough was 42,520 in the 1952–53 season in Division 1. The highest average attendance in the second tier of English football was 41,682 in the 1951–52 season, which saw the club gain promotion from Division 2 and Derek Dooley score a record 46 league goals. The highest average attendance in the third tier of English football was achieved in the 2004–05 season when an average of 23,107 fans watched the League One games at Hillsborough.

The lowest average attendance at Hillsborough came in the first season after its opening (1899–1900) when each game was attended by an average crowd of just 6,800 fans, mainly because the new stadium, then called Owlerton Stadium, was a fraction of the size it is today.

The largest gate receipts taken from a match at Hillsborough was for the Euro 96 game between Turkey and Denmark on 19 June 1996. A crowd of 28,671 watched the match, paying a total of £1,012,150.

Hillsborough still holds the record for the highest attendance for a third tier football match in Britain. 49,309 spectators turned up on 26 December 1979, one of the most memorable days in SWFC history, when the Owls beat Sheffield United 4–0 in a top of the table clash, now known as the Boxing Day Massacre.

The largest receipts for a club game at Hillsborough were for the FA Cup semi-final replay between Chesterfield and Middlesbrough on 22 April 1997 and totalled £680,965. The game was watched by 30,339 fans.

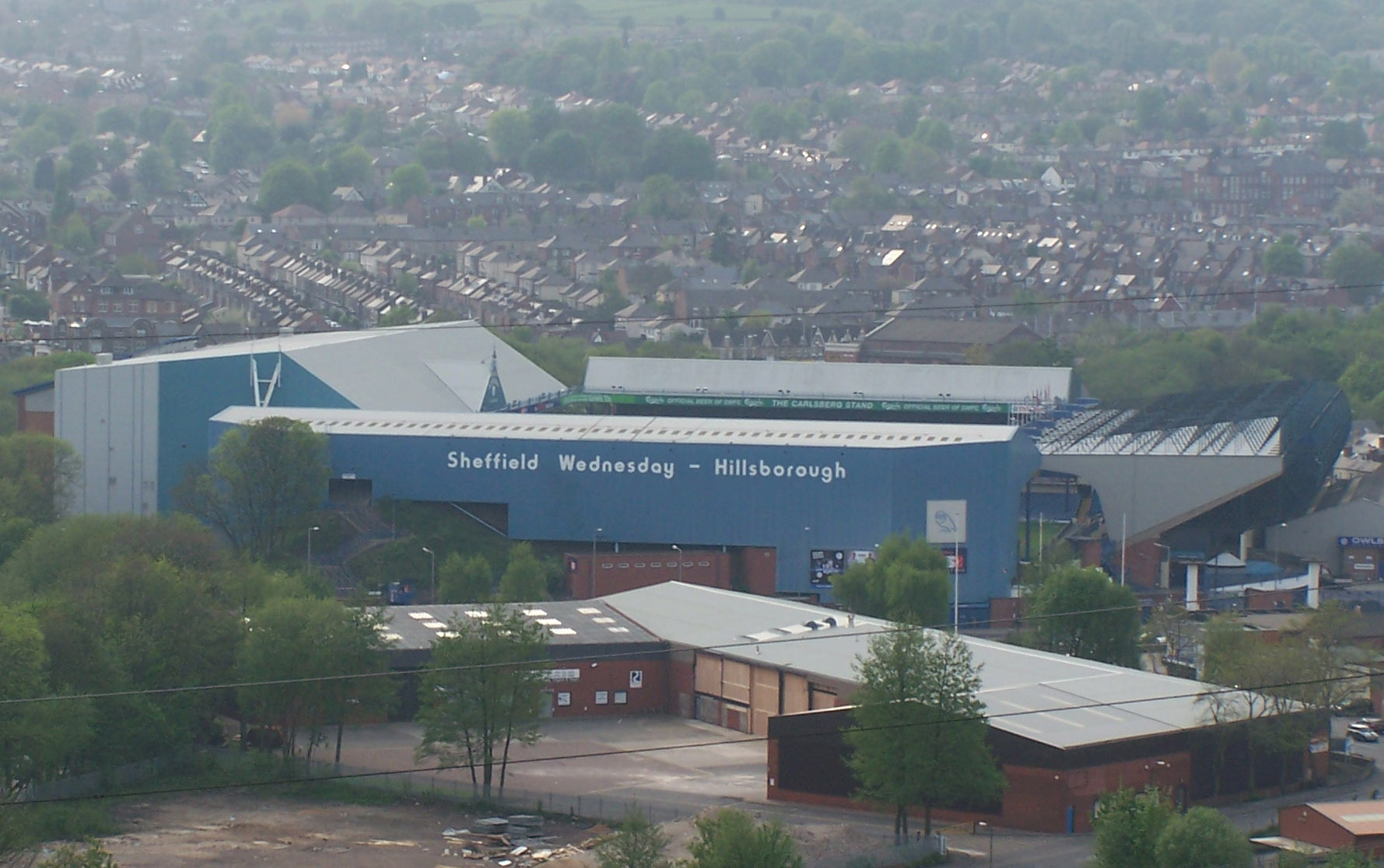
The stadium seen from Shirecliffe, one mile to the east.

The highest receipts for a game at Hillsborough involving Sheffield Wednesday was for the Premier League match against Manchester United on 7 March 1998, which was watched by 39,427 fans and earned the club £386,426.

== International football ==
Hillsborough was used as a venue for the 1966 FIFA World Cup and 1996 UEFA European championships. It was also used for some England matches before Wembley Stadium was built.

Date		Result		Competition	Attendance	Notes
1920-10-04	England	5–4	Scotland	1920 British Home Championship	35,000	
1962-10-03	England	1–1	France	UEFA Euro 1964 qualifier	35,380	
1966-07-12	West Germany	5–0	Switzerland	1966 FIFA World Cup group stage	36,000	
1966-07-15	Spain	2–1	Switzerland	1966 FIFA World Cup group stage	32,000	
1966-07-19	Argentina	2–0	Switzerland	1966 FIFA World Cup group stage	32,000	
1966-07-23	West Germany	4–0	Uruguay	1966 FIFA World Cup quarter-final	34,000	
1973-09-26	Northern Ireland	0–0	Bulgaria	1974 FIFA World Cup qualifier	6,206	
1996-06-09	Portugal	1–1	Denmark	UEFA Euro 1996 group stage	34,993	
1996-06-16	Croatia	3–0	Denmark	UEFA Euro 1996 group stage	33,671	
1996-06-19	Turkey	0–3	Denmark	UEFA Euro 1996 group stage	28,951	

It hosted two England under-21 internationals. The first was a 1984 UEFA European Under-21 Championship Qualifying Group 3 match against France's under-21s on 28 February 1984. The hosts thrashed the visitors, 6–1, with Mark Hateley scoring four goals as well as single goals from Dave Watson and Mel Sterland. The other was a 2006 UEFA European Under-21 Championship qualification Group 6 match against Poland's under-21s on 11 October 2005. The hosts thrashed the visitors, 4–1, with Steven Taylor scoring twice as well as single goals from Carlton Cole and Jerome Thomas while Marcin Kikut scored for the visitors with 23,110 in attendance.

== English 2018 and 2022 FIFA World Cup bid ==
Hillsborough Stadium was selected by The FA as a proposed venue for matches as part of the England 2018 FIFA World Cup bid on 16 December 2009.
