= Lists of England international footballers =

This is a list of articles listing players who have been capped for either the men's England national football team or the women's England women's national football team.

== Men ==
- England national football team records
- List of England international footballers with 10 caps or more
- List of England international footballers (4–9 caps)
- List of England international footballers (2–3 caps)
- List of England international footballers born outside England
- List of England international footballers capped while playing for a lower division club
- List of England international footballers with one cap
- List of England national football team captains
- List of England national football team hat-tricks
- List of England national football team World Cup and European Championship squads

== Women ==
- List of England women's international footballers (alphabetical)
- List of England national football team captains
