= List of England international footballers with one cap =

The England national football team represents the country of England in international association football. It is fielded by The Football Association, the governing body of football in England, and competes as a member of the Union of European Football Associations, which encompasses the countries of Europe. England competed in the first official international football match on 30 November 1872, a 0–0 draw with Scotland at Hamilton Crescent.

England have competed in numerous competitions, and all players who have played in only one match, either as a member of the starting eleven or as a substitute, are listed below. Each player's details include his usual playing position while with the team, the number of caps earned and goals scored in all international matches, and details of the first and most recent matches played in. The names are initially ordered by date of debut, and then by alphabetical order. All statistics are correct up to and including the match played on 15 November 2026.

== Key ==
Player
This colour background and the * symbol indicate that the player was still eligible to play for England and active at club level as at the date specified above.

Positions key
Pre-1960s		1960s–	
GK	Goalkeeper		
FB	Full back	DF	Defender
HB	Half back	MF	Midfielder
FW	Forward		

Position
Playing positions are listed according to the tactical formations that were employed at the time. Thus the change in the names of defensive and midfield positions reflects the tactical evolution that occurred from the 1960s onwards.
Caps and goals
Caps and goals comprise those in the FIFA World Cup and UEFA European Championship, their associated qualification matches and international friendly tournaments and matches.

== Players ==
England national football team players with one cap
Player	Pos.	Goals	Appearance		Refs.
Player	Pos.	Goals	Date	Opponent	Refs.
Robert Barker	GK	0	30 November 1872	Scotland	
John Brockbank	FW	0	30 November 1872	Scotland	
Frederick Chappell	HB	0	30 November 1872	Scotland	
Charles Clegg	FW	0	30 November 1872	Scotland	
Charles Morice	FW	0	30 November 1872	Scotland	
Arnold Kirke Smith	FW	0	30 November 1872	Scotland	
Alfred Goodwyn	HB	0	8 March 1873	Scotland	
Leonard Howell	FB	0	8 March 1873	Scotland	
William Kenyon-Slaney	FW	2	8 March 1873	Scotland	
Alexander Morten	GK	0	8 March 1873	Scotland	
Robert Vidal	FB	0	8 March 1873	Scotland	
John Edwards	FW	0	7 March 1874	Scotland	
Robert Kingsford	FW	1	7 March 1874	Scotland	
Robert Ogilvie	FB	0	7 March 1874	Scotland	
John Owen	FW	0	7 March 1874	Scotland	
Alfred Stratford	FB	0	7 March 1874	Scotland	
Charles Alcock	FW	1	6 March 1875	Scotland	
William Carr	GK	0	6 March 1875	Scotland	
Richard Geaves	FW	0	6 March 1875	Scotland	
Edward Haygarth	FB	0	6 March 1875	Scotland	
Herbert Rawson	FW	0	6 March 1875	Scotland	
Ernest Bambridge	HB	0	4 March 1876	Scotland	
Walter Buchanan	FW	0	4 March 1876	Scotland	
Frederick Green	FB	0	4 March 1876	Scotland	
Francis Heron	FW	0	4 March 1876	Scotland	
A. H. Savage	GK	0	4 March 1876	Scotland	
Charles Smith	FW	0	4 March 1876	Scotland	
John Bain	FW	0	3 March 1877	Scotland	
Morton Betts	GK	0	3 March 1877	Scotland	
William Lindsay	FB	0	3 March 1877	Scotland	
Alfred Lyttelton	FW	1	3 March 1877	Scotland	
Cecil Wingfield-Stratford	FW	0	3 March 1877	Scotland	
Percy Fairclough	FW	0	2 March 1878	Scotland	
Edward Lyttelton	FB	0	2 March 1878	Scotland	
Conrad Warner	GK	0	2 March 1878	Scotland	
John Wylie	FW	1	2 March 1878	Scotland	
Rupert Anderson	GK	0	18 January 1879	Wales	
Thomas Sorby	FW	1	18 January 1879	Wales	
Herbert Whitfeld	FW	1	18 January 1879	Wales	
Reg Birkett	GK	0	5 April 1879	Scotland	
Edward Christian	FB	0	5 April 1879	Scotland	
Arnold Hills	FW	0	5 April 1879	Scotland	
Harold Morse	FB	0	5 April 1879	Scotland	
James Prinsep	HB	0	5 April 1879	Scotland	
Arthur Goodyer	FW	1	5 April 1879	Scotland	
Segar Bastard	FW	0	13 March 1880	Scotland	
Sam Weller Widdowson	FW	0	13 March 1880	Scotland	
John Sands	GK	0	15 March 1880	Wales	
Alf Harvey	FB	0	26 February 1881	Wales	
George Tait	FW	0	26 February 1881	Wales	
Reginald Macaulay	FW	0	12 March 1881	Scotland	
Horace Barnet	FW	0	18 February 1882	Ireland	
Robert King	HB	0	18 February 1882	Ireland	
John Rawlinson	GK	0	18 February 1882	Ireland	
Percival Parr	FW	0	13 March 1882	Wales	
Bruce Russell	FB	0	3 February 1883	Wales	
Jack Hudson	HB	0	24 February 1883	Ireland	
John Dixon	FW	0	14 March 1885	Wales	
Jimmy Ward	FB	0	14 March 1885	Wales	
Thomas Danks	FW	0	21 March 1885	Scotland	
Charles Dobson	HB	0	13 March 1886	Ireland	
Teddy Leighton	FW	0	13 March 1886	Ireland	
Thelwell Pike	FW	0	13 March 1886	Ireland	
George Shutt	HB	0	13 March 1886	Ireland	
Teddy Brayshaw	HB	0	5 February 1887	Ireland	
Jimmy Sayer	FW	0	5 February 1887	Ireland	
Frank Saunders	HB	0	4 February 1888	Wales	
Charlie Shelton	HB	0	7 April 1888	Ireland	
Albert Allen	FW	3	7 April 1888	Ireland	
Billy Betts	HB	0	23 February 1889	Wales	
Arthur Lowder	HB	0	23 February 1889	Wales	
Frank Burton	FW	0	2 March 1889	Ireland	
Jack Yates	EW	3	2 March 1889	Ireland	
Henry Hammond	HB	0	13 April 1889	Scotland	
Nat Walton	FW	0	15 March 1890	Ireland	
John Barton	HB	1	15 March 1890	Ireland	
Jem Bayliss	HB	0	7 March 1891	Ireland	
Elphinstone Jackson	FB	0	7 March 1891	Wales	
Joseph Marsden	FB	0	7 March 1891	Ireland	
Tom Porteous	FB	0	7 March 1891	Wales	
Leonard Wilkinson	GK	0	7 March 1891	Wales	
John Cox	HB	0	5 March 1892	Ireland	
Harry Lilley	FB	0	5 March 1892	Wales	
John Pearson	FW	0	5 March 1892	Ireland	
Michael Whitham	HB	0	5 March 1892	Ireland	
Chris Charsley	GK	0	25 February 1893	Ireland	
Norman Cooper	HB	0	25 February 1893	Ireland	
Walter Gilliat	FW	3	25 February 1893	Ireland	
Harry Chippendale	FW	0	3 March 1894	Ireland	
Joe Reader	GK	0	3 March 1894	Ireland	
Arthur Topham	HB	0	12 March 1894	Wales	
John Veitch	FW	3	12 March 1894	Wales	
Richard Barker	HB	0	18 March 1895	Wales	
Gerard Dewhurst	FW	0	18 March 1895	Wales	
Hugh Stanbrough	FW	0	18 March 1895	Wales	
Steve Smith	FW	1	6 April 1895	Scotland	
Cuthbert Burnup	FW	0	4 April 1896	Scotland	
Harry Bradshaw	FW	0	20 February 1897	Ireland	
Bernard Middleditch	HB	0	20 February 1897	Ireland	
William Foulke	GK	0	29 March 1897	Wales	
Ben Garfield	FW	0	5 March 1898	Ireland	
Tommy Morren	HB	1	5 March 1898	Ireland	
Charlie Richards	FW	0	5 March 1898	Ireland	
Tom Perry	HB	0	28 March 1898	Wales	
Phil Bach	FB	0	18 February 1899	Ireland	
Jack Hillman	GK	0	18 February 1899	Ireland	
Dan Cunliffe	FW	0	17 March 1900	Ireland	
Fred Priest	FW	0	17 March 1900	Ireland	
Alf Spouncer	FW	0	26 March 1900	Wales	
Jack Plant	FW	0	7 April 1900	Scotland	
Herbert Banks	FW	0	9 March 1901	Ireland	
C. B. Fry	FB	0	9 March 1901	Ireland	
George Hedley	FW	0	9 March 1901	Ireland	
William Jones	HB	0	9 March 1901	Ireland	
Bertie Corbett	FW	0	18 March 1901	Wales	
Matt Kingsley	GK	0	18 March 1901	Wales	
Walter Abbott	HB	0	3 March 1902	Wales	
Bert Lipsham	FW	0	3 March 1902	Wales	
John Calvey	FW	0	22 March 1902	Ireland	
Harry Hadley	HB	0	14 February 1903	Ireland	
Tom Holford	HB	0	14 February 1903	Ireland	
Arthur Lockett	FW	0	14 February 1903	Ireland	
Rex Corbett	FW	0	2 March 1903	Wales	
Billy Garraty	FW	0	2 March 1903	Wales	
Arthur Capes	FW	0	4 April 1903	Scotland	
Percy Humphreys	FW	0	4 April 1903	Scotland	
Bert Lee	HB	0	29 February 1904	Wales	
Bernard Wilkinson	HB	0	9 April 1904	Scotland	
Billy Balmer	FB	0	25 February 1905	Ireland	
Frank Booth	FW	0	25 February 1905	Ireland	
Bert Gosnell	FW	0	17 February 1906	Ireland	
Gordon Wright	FW	0	19 March 1906	Wales	
James Conlin	FW	0	7 April 1906	Scotland	
Tim Coleman	FW	0	16 February 1907	Ireland	
Irvine Thornley	FW	0	18 March 1907	Wales	
Harry Maskrey	GK	0	15 February 1908	Ireland	
Frank Bradshaw	FW	3	8 June 1908	Austria	
Arthur Berry	FW	0	13 February 1909	Ireland	
Joe Cottle	FB	0	13 February 1909	Ireland	
George Richards	HB	0	1 June 1909	Austria	
Harold Halse	FW	2	1 June 1909	Austria	
Arthur Cowell	FB	0	12 February 1910	Ireland	
Bert Hall	FW	0	12 February 1910	Ireland	
Bert Morley	FB	0	12 February 1910	Ireland	
Wally Hardinge	FW	0	2 April 1910	Scotland	
Billy Hibbert	FW	0	2 April 1910	Scotland	
George Woodger	FW	0	11 February 1911	Ireland	
Bob Benson	FB	0	15 February 1913	Ireland	
Tommy Boyle	HB	0	15 February 1913	Ireland	
George Utley	HB	0	15 February 1913	Ireland	
Hugh Moffat	HB	0	17 March 1913	Wales	
Ernald Scattergood	GK	0	17 March 1913	Wales	
Frank Buckley	HB	0	14 February 1914	Ireland	
Henry Martin	FW	0	14 February 1914	Ireland	
Horace Colclough	FB	0	16 March 1914	Wales	
Jimmy Bagshaw	HB	0	25 October 1919	Ireland	
Sid Bowser	HB	0	25 October 1919	Ireland	
Arthur Knight	FB	0	25 October 1919	Ireland	
Bobby Turnbull	FW	0	25 October 1919	Ireland	
Frank Barson	HB	0	15 March 1920	Wales	
Dickie Downs	FB	0	23 October 1920	Ireland	
Jack Mew	GK	0	23 October 1920	Ireland	
Jack Bamber	HB	0	14 March 1921	Wales	
Bert Coleman	GK	0	14 March 1921	Wales	
Bert Bliss	FW	0	9 April 1921	Scotland	
Harold Gough	GK	0	9 April 1921	Scotland	
Jack Fort	FB	0	21 May 1921	Belgium	
Archibald Rawlings	FW	0	21 May 1921	Belgium	
Albert Read	HB	0	21 May 1921	Belgium	
Ernie Simms	FW	0	22 October 1921	Ireland	
Billy Kirton	FW	1	22 October 1921	Ireland	
Teddy Davison	GK	0	13 March 1922	Wales	
Max Woosnam	HB	0	13 March 1922	Wales	
Jack Alderson	GK	0	10 May 1923	France	
Frank Hartley	FW	0	10 May 1923	France	
Harry Jones	FB	0	10 May 1923	France	
Seth Plum	HB	0	10 May 1923	France	
Norman Creek	FW	1	10 May 1923	France	
Jimmy Moore	FW	1	21 May 1923	Sweden	
Harold Miller	FW	1	24 May 1923	Sweden	
Billy Moore	FW	2	24 May 1923	Sweden	
Fred Bullock	FB	0	20 October 1923	Ireland	
Tommy Meehan	HB	0	20 October 1923	Ireland	
Harry Pantling	HB	0	20 October 1923	Ireland	
Graham Doggart	FW	0	1 November 1923	Belgium	
Billy Brown	FW	1	1 November 1923	Belgium	
Ronnie Sewell	GK	0	3 March 1924	Wales	
Clem Stephenson	FW	0	3 March 1924	Wales	
Billy Butler	FW	0	12 April 1924	Scotland	
George Blackburn	HB	0	17 May 1924	France	
James Mitchell	GK	0	22 October 1924	Ireland	
Jack Butler	HB	0	8 December 1924	Belgium	
Harry Hardy	GK	0	8 December 1924	Belgium	
Tommy Cook	FW	0	28 February 1925	Wales	
William Bryant	HB	0	21 May 1925	France	
Billy Felton	FB	0	21 May 1925	France	
Freddie Fox	GK	0	21 May 1925	France	
Tom Parker	FB	0	21 May 1925	France	
George Armitage	HB	0	24 October 1925	Ireland	
Claude Ashton	FW	0	24 October 1925	Ireland	
Billy Austin	FW	0	24 October 1925	Ireland	
Frank Hudspeth	FB	0	24 October 1925	Ireland	
Ted Harper	FW	0	17 April 1926	Scotland	
George Ashmore	GK	0	24 May 1926	Belgium	
Richard Hill	FB	0	24 May 1926	Belgium	
Albert McInroy	GK	0	20 October 1926	Ireland	
Billy Pease	FW	0	12 February 1927	Wales	
George Waterfield	FB	0	12 February 1927	Wales	
Jack Ball	FW	0	22 October 1927	Ireland	
Alf Baker	HB	0	28 November 1927	Wales	
Reg Osborne	FB	0	28 November 1927	Wales	
Dan Tremelling	GK	0	28 November 1927	Wales	
Tom Wilson	HB	0	31 March 1928	Scotland	
Jim Barrett	HB	0	22 October 1928	Ireland	
Russell Wainscoat	FW	0	13 April 1929	Scotland	
Len Oliver	HB	0	11 May 1929	Belgium	
Albert Barrett	HB	0	19 October 1929	Ireland	
Jackie Crawford	FW	0	28 March 1931	Scotland	
Herbie Roberts	HB	0	28 March 1931	Scotland	
Harry Roberts	FW	0	16 May 1931	Belgium	
Harold Pearson	GK	0	9 April 1932	Scotland	
George Shaw	FB	0	9 April 1932	Scotland	
Teddy Sandford	FW	0	16 November 1932	Wales	
Johnny Arnold	FW	0	1 April 1933	Scotland	
Jack Pickering	FW	0	1 April 1933	Scotland	
Billy Furness	FW	0	13 May 1933	Italy	
Tommy White	HB	0	13 May 1933	Italy	
David Fairhurst	FB	0	6 December 1933	France	
Arthur Rowe	HB	0	6 December 1933	France	
Joe Beresford	FW	0	16 May 1934	Czechoslovakia	
Jackie Bestall	FW	0	6 February 1935	Ireland	
Walter Alsford	HB	0	6 April 1935	Scotland	
Bobby Gurney	FW	0	6 April 1935	Scotland	
George Eastham	FW	0	18 May 1935	Netherlands	
William Richardson	FW	0	18 May 1935	Netherlands	
Ralph Birkett	GW	0	19 October 1935	Ireland	
Sep Smith	HB	0	19 October 1935	Ireland	
Jimmy Cunliffe	FW	0	9 May 1936	Belgium	
Bernard Joy	HB	0	9 May 1936	Belgium	
Billy Scott	FW	0	17 October 1936	Wales	
Tom Smalley	HB	0	17 October 1936	Wales	
George Tweedy	GK	0	2 December 1936	Italy	
Harry Betmead	HB	0	20 May 1937	Ireland	
Joe Payne	FW	2	20 May 1937	Finland	
Jackie Morton	FW	1	1 December 1937	Czechoslovakia	
Micky Fenton	FW	0	9 April 1938	Scotland	
Ronnie Dix	FW	1	9 November 1938	Norway	
Doug Wright	FW	0	9 November 1938	Norway	
Pat Beasley	FW	1	15 April 1939	Scotland	
Les Smith	FW	0	24 May 1939	Romania	
Jimmy Hagan	FW	0	26 September 1948	Denmark	
Jack Haines	FW	2	2 December 1948	Switzerland	
Eddie Shimwell	FB	0	13 May 1949	Sweden	
Jesse Pye	FW	0	21 September 1949	Republic of Ireland	
Bernard Streten	GK	0	16 November 1949	Ireland	
Jack Lee	FW	1	7 October 1950	Ireland	
Bill Nicholson	HB	1	19 May 1951	Portugal	
Arthur Willis	FB	0	3 October 1951	France	
Arthur Milton	FW	0	28 November 1951	Austria	
Derek Ufton	HB	0	21 October 1953	Rest of Europe	
Stan Rickaby	FB	0	11 November 1953	Ireland	
George Robb	FW	0	25 November 1953	Hungary	
Ernie Taylor	FW	0	25 November 1953	Hungary	
Harry Clarke	HB	0	3 April 1954	Scotland	
Ray Barlow	HB	0	2 October 1954	Northern Ireland	
Bill Foulkes	FB	0	2 October 1954	Northern Ireland	
Brian Pilkington	FW	0	2 October 1954	Northern Ireland	
Johnny Wheeler	HB	0	2 October 1954	Northern Ireland	
Ken Armstrong	HB	0	2 April 1955	Scotland	
Jimmy Meadows	FB	0	2 April 1955	Scotland	
Geoff Bradford	FW	1	2 October 1955	Denmark	
David Pegg	FW	0	19 May 1957	Republic of Ireland	
Danny Clapton	FW	0	26 November 1958	Wales	
Ken Brown	HB	0	18 November 1959	Northern Ireland	
John Angus	FB	0	27 May 1961	Austria	
Brian Miller	HB	0	27 May 1961	Austria	
Johnny Fantham	FW	0	28 September 1961	Luxembourg	
Ray Charnley	FW	0	3 October 1962	France	
Chris Crowe	FW	0	3 October 1962	France	
Ron Henry	FB	0	27 February 1963	France	
Ken Shellito	FB	0	29 May 1963	Czechoslovakia	
Tony Kay	HB	1	5 June 1963	Switzerland	
Gerry Young	HB	0	18 November 1964	Wales	
Derek Temple	FW	0	12 May 1965	West Germany	
Gordon Harris	FW	0	5 January 1966	Poland	
John Hollins	FW	0	24 May 1967	Spain	
Alex Stepney	GK	0	22 May 1968	Sweden	
Ian Storey-Moore	FW	0	14 January 1970	Netherlands	
Colin Harvey	MF	0	3 February 1971	Malta	
Tony Brown	FW	0	19 May 1971	Wales	
Tommy Smith	HB	0	19 May 1971	Wales	
Jeff Blockley	HB	0	11 October 1972	Yugoslavia	
John Richards	FW	0	12 May 1973	Northern Ireland	
Phil Parkes	GK	0	3 April 1974	Portugal	
Brian Little	FW	0	21 May 1975	Wales	
Phil Boyer	FW	0	24 March 1976	Wales	
Jimmy Rimmer	GK	0	28 May 1976	Italy	
Charlie George	FW	0	8 September 1976	Republic of Ireland	
John Gidman	DF	0	30 March 1977	Luxembourg	
Trevor Whymark	MF	0	12 October 1977	Luxembourg	
Alan Sunderland	FW	0	31 May 1980	Australia	
Peter Ward	MF	0	31 May 1980	Australia	
Steve Perryman	MF	0	2 June 1982	Iceland	
Paul Goddard	FW	1	2 June 1982	Iceland	
Nick Pickering	DF	0	19 June 1983	Australia	
Nigel Spink	GK	0	19 June 1983	Australia	
Brian Stein	MF	0	29 February 1984	France	
Peter Davenport	FW	0	26 March 1985	Republic of Ireland	
Danny Wallace	FW	1	29 January 1986	Egypt	
Brian Marwood	MF	0	16 November 1988	Saudi Arabia	
Mel Sterland	DF	0	16 November 1988	Saudi Arabia	
Mike Phelan	MF	0	15 November 1989	Italy	
Mark Walters	MF	0	3 June 1991	New Zealand	
Andy Gray	MF	0	13 November 1991	Poland	
David White	MF	0	9 September 1992	Spain	
Kevin Richardson	MF	0	17 May 1994	Greece	
Neil Ruddock	DF	0	16 November 1994	Nigeria	
David Unsworth	DF	0	3 June 1995	Japan	
Chris Sutton	FW	0	15 November 1997	Cameroon	
Lee Hendrie	MF	0	18 November 1998	Czech Republic	
Steve Guppy	MF	0	10 October 1999	Belgium	
Seth Johnson	MF	0	15 November 2000	Italy	
Michael Ball	DF	0	28 February 2001	Spain	
Gavin McCann	MF	0	28 February 2001	Spain	
Michael Ricketts	FW	0	13 February 2002	Netherlands	
Lee Bowyer	MF	0	7 September 2002	Portugal	
David Dunn	MF	0	7 September 2002	Portugal	
Francis Jeffers	FW	1	12 February 2003	Australia	
Anthony Gardner	DF	0	31 March 2004	Sweden	
Alan Thompson	MF	0	31 March 2004	Sweden	
Chris Kirkland	GK	0	16 August 2006	Greece	
Joey Barton	MF	0	7 February 2007	Spain	
David Nugent	FW	1	28 March 2007	Andorra	
Dean Ashton	FW	0	1 June 2008	Trinidad and Tobago	
Kevin Davies	FW	0	10 October 2010	Montenegro	
Jay Bothroyd	FW	0	17 November 2010	France	
Matt Jarvis	MF	0	29 March 2011	Ghana	
Fraizer Campbell	FW	0	29 February 2012	Netherlands	
Martin Kelly	DF	0	26 May 2012	Norway	
John Ruddy *	GK	0	15 August 2012	Italy	
Steven Caulker	DF	1	14 November 2012	Sweden	
Carl Jenkinson	DF	0	14 November 2012	Sweden	
Ryan Shawcross	DF	0	14 November 2012	Sweden	
Jay Rodriguez	FW	0	15 November 2013	Chile	
Jon Flanagan	MF	0	4 June 2014	Ecuador	
Ryan Mason	MF	0	31 March 2015	Italy	
Nathan Redmond	MF	0	22 March 2017	Germany	
Jack Cork	MF	0	10 November 2017	Germany	
Lewis Cook *	MF	0	27 March 2018	Italy	
Nathaniel Chalobah *	MF	0	15 October 2018	Spain	
Alex McCarthy *	GK	0	15 November 2018	United States	
Mason Greenwood	FW	0	5 September 2020	Iceland	
Patrick Bamford *	FW	0	5 September 2021	Andorra	
James Justin *	DF	0	4 June 2022	Hungary	
Eddie Nketiah *	FW	0	13 October 2023	Australia	
Taylor Harwood-Bellis *	DF	1	17 November 2024	Republic of Ireland	

== See also ==
- List of England international footballers, covering players with ten or more caps
- List of England international footballers (4–9 caps)
- List of England international footballers (2–3 caps)
