= Tom Brindle =

Tom Brindle may refer to:

- Tom Brindle (footballer) (1861–1905), English footballer
- Tom Brindle (politician) (1878–1950), member of the New Zealand Legislative Council
