= Alfred Dobson =

Alfred Dobson may refer to:

- Alfred Dobson (footballer)
- Alfred Dobson (politician)
