= John Sands =

John Sands may refer to:

- John Sands (printer) (1818–1873)
  - John Sands (company), founded by the above
- John Sands (journalist) (1826–1900)
- John Sands (footballer) (1859–1924)
- Johnny Sands (1928–2003), actor
- Johnny Sands (speed skater) (1933–2020)

== See also ==
- John Sandys (disambiguation)
