= List of England international footballers (4–9 caps) =

The England national football team represents the country of England in international association football. It is fielded by The Football Association, the governing body of football in England, and competes as a member of the Union of European Football Associations (UEFA), which encompasses the countries of Europe. England competed in the first official international football match on 30 November 1872, a 0–0 draw with Scotland at Hamilton Crescent.

England have competed in numerous competitions, and all players who have played between four and nine matches, either as a member of the starting eleven or as a substitute, are listed below. Each player's details include his usual playing position while with the team, the number of caps earned and goals scored in all international matches, and details of the first and most recent matches played in. The names are initially ordered by number of caps (in descending order), then by date of debut, then by alphabetical order. All statistics are correct up to 15 November 2026.

== Key ==
Player
This colour background and the * symbol indicate that the player was active at club level as at the date specified above.

Positions key
Pre-1960s		1960s–	
GK	Goalkeeper		
FB	Full back	DF	Defender
HB	Half back	MF	Midfielder
FW	Forward		

Position
Playing positions are listed according to the tactical formations that were employed at the time. Thus the change in the names of defensive and midfield positions reflects the tactical evolution that occurred from the 1960s onwards.
Caps and goals
Caps and goals comprise those in the FIFA World Cup and UEFA European Championship, their associated qualification matches and international friendly tournaments and matches.

== Players ==
England national football team players with 4 to 9 caps
Player	Pos.	Caps	Goals	Debut		Last or most recent match		Refs.
Player	Pos.	Caps	Goals	Date	Opponent	Date	Opponent	Refs.
Billy Mosforth	FW	9	3	3 March 1877	Scotland	13 March 1882	Wales	
Nevill Cobbold	FW	9	6	24 January 1883	Ireland	19 March 1887	Scotland	
Arthur Melmoth Walters	FB	9	0	28 January 1885	Ireland	5 April 1890	Scotland	
Fred Dewhurst	FW	9	11	13 March 1886	Ireland	23 January 1889	Wales	
Frank Forman	HB	9	1	5 March 1898	Ireland	2 March 1903	Wales	
Sam Wadsworth	FB	9	0	8 April 1922	Scotland	20 October 1926	Ireland	
Fred Kean	HB	9	0	19 March 1923	Belgium	15 May 1929	Spain	
David Jack	FW	9	3	3 March 1924	Wales	7 December 1932	Austria	
George Brown	FW	9	5	20 October 1926	Ireland	16 November 1932	Wales	
Joe Hulme	FW	9	4	2 April 1927	Scotland	1 April 1933	Scotland	
George Camsell	FW	9	18	9 May 1929	France	9 May 1936	Belgium	
Alf Young	HB	9	0	16 November 1932	Wales	22 October 1938	Wales	
Cliff Britton	HB	9	1	29 September 1934	Wales	17 May 1937	Sweden	
Eddie Baily	FW	9	5	2 July 1950	Spain	4 October 1952	Ireland	
Mick McNeil	FB	9	0	8 October 1960	Northern Ireland	28 September 1961	Luxembourg	
Rodney Marsh	FW	9	1	10 November 1971	Switzerland	24 January 1973	Wales	
Kevin Beattie	DF	9	1	16 April 1975	Cyprus	12 October 1977	Luxembourg	
Joe Corrigan	GK	9	0	28 May 1976	Italy	2 June 1982	Iceland	
Geoff Thomas	MF	9	0	1 May 1991	Turkey	19 January 1992	France	
Steve Stone	MF	9	2	11 October 1995	Norway	22 June 1996	Spain	
Danny Murphy	MF	9	1	10 November 2001	Sweden	16 November 2003	Denmark	
Andy Carroll	FW	9	2	17 November 2010	France	12 October 2012	San Marino	
Jack Butland	GK	9	0	15 August 2012	Italy	11 September 2018	Switzerland	
Callum Wilson	FW	9	2	15 November 2018	United States	12 September 2023	Scotland	
Lewis Hall	DF	9	0	14 November 2024	Greece	15 November 2026	Spain	
Harry Cursham	FW	8	5	15 March 1880	Wales	23 January 1884	Ireland	
Jack Reynolds	HB	8	2	2 April 1892	Scotland	3 April 1897	Scotland	
Dicky Bond	FW	8	2	25 January 1905	Ireland	2 April 1910	Scotland	
George Hilsdon	FW	8	14	16 January 1907	Ireland	13 January 1909	Ireland	
Jimmy Windridge	FW	8	7	15 January 1908	Ireland	13 January 1909	Ireland	
Jock Simpson	FW	8	1	11 January 1911	Ireland	16 March 1914	Wales	
Sam Chedgzoy	FW	8	0	15 March 1920	Wales	22 October 1924	Ireland	
Harry Chambers	FW	8	5	14 March 1921	Wales	20 October 1923	Ireland	
Ted Taylor	GK	8	0	21 October 1922	Ireland	17 April 1926	Scotland	
George Green	HB	8	0	21 May 1925	France	19 May 1928	Belgium	
Austen Campbell	HB	8	0	22 October 1928	Ireland	9 December 1931	Spain	
Ernie Hart	HB	8	0	17 November 1928	Wales	16 May 1934	Czechoslovakia	
Jack Crayston	HB	8	1	4 December 1935	Switzerland	1 December 1937	Czechoslovakia	
Stan Pearson	FW	8	5	10 April 1948	Scotland	18 May 1952	Italy	
Ron Staniforth	FB	8	0	3 April 1954	Scotland	1 December 1954	West Germany	
Colin McDonald	GK	8	0	18 May 1958	Soviet Union	26 November 1958	Wales	
Joe Baker	FW	8	3	18 November 1959	Northern Ireland	5 January 1966	Poland	
Bobby Thomson	FB	8	0	20 November 1963	Northern Ireland	9 December 1964	Netherlands	
Mike Summerbee	FW	8	1	24 January 1968	Scotland	10 June 1973	Soviet Union	
Frank Worthington	FW	8	2	15 May 1974	Northern Ireland	20 November 1974	Portugal	
Dave Thomas	MF	8	0	30 October 1974	Czechoslovakia	19 November 1975	Portugal	
David Johnson	FW	8	6	21 May 1975	Wales	12 June 1980	Belgium	
Alan Devonshire	MF	8	0	20 May 1980	Northern Ireland	16 November 1983	Luxembourg	
Mark Chamberlain	MF	8	1	15 December 1982	Luxembourg	17 October 1984	Finland	
Kerry Dixon	FW	8	4	9 June 1985	Mexico	10 September 1986	Sweden	
Lee Sharpe	MF	8	0	27 March 1991	Republic of Ireland	13 October 1993	Netherlands	
Rob Jones	DF	8	0	19 January 1992	France	29 March 1995	Uruguay	
Matt Le Tissier	MF	8	0	9 March 1994	Denmark	12 January 1997	Italy	
Kevin Phillips	FW	8	0	28 April 1999	Hungary	13 January 2002	Netherlands	
Jonathan Woodgate	DF	8	0	9 June 1999	Bulgaria	20 August 2008	Czech Republic	
Andrew Johnson	FW	8	0	9 January 2005	Netherlands	8 September 2007	Israel	
Kieran Richardson	MF	8	2	28 May 2005	United States	15 November 2006	Netherlands	
Ben Foster	GK	8	0	7 January 2007	Spain	24 June 2014	Costa Rica	
Ben White	DF	8	2	2 June 2021	Austria	15 November 2026	Spain	
Jack Hunter	HB	7	0	2 March 1878	Scotland	13 March 1882	Wales	
Herbie Arthur	GK	7	0	28 January 1885	Ireland	26 January 1887	Wales	
Joe Lofthouse	FW	7	3	28 January 1885	Ireland	15 March 1890	Ireland	
Billy Moon	GK	7	0	4 January 1888	Wales	4 April 1891	Scotland	
Bob Holmes	FB	7	0	7 April 1888	Ireland	9 March 1895	Ireland	
Edgar Chadwick	FW	7	3	7 March 1891	Wales	3 April 1897	Scotland	
Fred Spiksley	FW	7	7	13 March 1893	Wales	2 April 1898	Scotland	
Joe Bache	FW	7	4	2 March 1903	Wales	1 April 1911	Scotland	
Tim Williamson	GK	7	0	25 January 1905	Ireland	15 January 1913	Ireland	
George Wall	FW	7	2	18 March 1907	Wales	15 January 1913	Ireland	
Evelyn Lintott	HB	7	0	15 January 1908	Ireland	31 May 1909	Hungary	
Warney Cresswell	FB	7	0	14 March 1921	Wales	19 October 1929	Ireland	
Percy Barton	HB	7	0	21 May 1921	Belgium	22 October 1924	Ireland	
Fred Tunstall	FW	7	0	14 April 1923	Scotland	4 April 1925	Scotland	
Louis Page	FW	7	1	12 January 1927	Wales	28 November 1927	Wales	
Eric Houghton	FW	7	5	20 October 1930	Ireland	7 December 1932	Austria	
Frank Broome	FW	7	3	14 May 1938	Germany	24 May 1939	Romania	
Colin Grainger	FW	7	3	9 May 1956	Brazil	6 April 1957	Scotland	
Peter Broadbent	FW	7	2	17 June 1958	Soviet Union	19 April 1960	Scotland	
Gerry Hitchens	FW	7	5	10 May 1961	Mexico	10 June 1962	Brazil	
Peter Bonetti	GK	7	0	3 July 1966	Denmark	14 June 1970	West Germany	
Steve Whitworth	DF	7	0	12 March 1975	West Germany	19 November 1975	Portugal	
Gary Stevens	DF	7	0	17 October 1984	Finland	18 June 1986	Paraguay	
Tony Cottee	FW	7	0	10 September 1986	Sweden	27 May 1989	Scotland	
Tony Daley	MF	7	0	13 November 1991	Poland	17 June 1992	Sweden	
Andy Hinchcliffe	DF	7	0	1 September 1996	Moldova	10 October 1998	Bulgaria	
Luke Young	DF	7	0	28 May 2005	United States	12 November 2005	Argentina	
David Bentley	MF	7	0	8 September 2007	Israel	20 August 2008	Czech Republic	
Carlton Cole	FW	7	0	11 January 2009	Spain	3 March 2010	Egypt	
Jake Livermore	MF	7	0	15 August 2012	Italy	14 November 2017	Brazil	
James Maddison	MF	7	0	14 November 2019	Montenegro	3 June 2024	Bosnia and Herzegovina	
Arthur Cursham	FW	6	2	4 March 1876	Scotland	10 March 1883	Scotland	
Albemarle Swepstone	GK	6	0	13 March 1880	Scotland	10 March 1883	Scotland	
Stuart Macrae	HB	6	0	3 January 1883	Wales	17 March 1884	Scotland	
Dennis Hodgetts	FW	6	1	4 January 1888	Wales	3 March 1894	Ireland	
Alf Shelton	HB	6	1	2 March 1889	Ireland	2 April 1892	Scotland	
Billy Williams	FB	6	0	20 January 1897	Ireland	20 March 1899	Wales	
Howard Spencer	FB	6	0	29 March 1897	Wales	1 April 1905	Scotland	
Jimmy Settle	FW	6	6	18 January 1899	Ireland	14 January 1903	Ireland	
Harry Johnson	HB	6	1	17 March 1900	Ireland	4 April 1903	Scotland	
Stanley Harris	FW	6	2	9 April 1904	Scotland	7 April 1906	Scotland	
Colin Veitch	HB	6	0	17 January 1906	Ireland	15 March 1909	Wales	
Andy Ducat	HB	6	1	12 January 1910	Ireland	23 October 1920	Ireland	
Charlie Buchan	FW	6	4	15 January 1913	Ireland	12 April 1924	Scotland	
Arthur Grimsdell	HB	6	0	15 March 1920	Wales	5 March 1923	Wales	
Jimmy Seddon	HB	6	0	10 May 1923	France	13 April 1929	Scotland	
Ted Hufton	GK	6	0	1 November 1923	Belgium	15 May 1929	Spain	
Jimmy Ruffell	FW	6	0	17 April 1926	Scotland	20 November 1929	Wales	
Jack Brown	GK	6	0	12 January 1927	Wales	19 October 1929	Ireland	
Herbert Jones	FB	6	0	2 April 1927	Scotland	31 March 1928	Scotland	
Ernie Hine	FW	6	4	22 October 1928	Ireland	18 November 1931	Wales	
Ray Bowden	FW	6	1	29 September 1934	Wales	2 December 1936	Hungary	
Jackie Bray	HB	6	0	29 September 1934	Wales	17 April 1937	Scotland	
Ray Westwood	FW	6	0	29 September 1934	Wales	17 October 1936	Wales	
Freddie Steele	FW	6	8	17 October 1936	Wales	20 May 1937	Finland	
Ted Ditchburn	GK	6	0	2 December 1948	Switzerland	5 December 1956	Denmark	
Jack Rowley	FW	6	6	2 December 1948	Switzerland	5 April 1952	Scotland	
Les Medley	FW	6	1	15 November 1950	Wales	28 November 1951	Austria	
Lionel Smith	FB	6	0	15 November 1950	Wales	18 April 1953	Scotland	
Jackie Sewell	FW	6	3	14 November 1951	Ireland	23 May 1954	Hungary	
Don Revie	FW	6	4	2 October 1954	Northern Ireland	6 October 1956	Northern Ireland	
John Atyeo	FW	6	5	30 November 1955	Spain	19 May 1957	Republic of Ireland	
Tommy Banks	FB	6	0	18 May 1958	Soviet Union	4 October 1958	Northern Ireland	
Alan Peacock	FW	6	3	2 June 1962	Argentina	10 November 1965	Northern Ireland	
Joe Royle	FW	6	2	3 January 1971	Malta	30 March 1977	Luxembourg	
Dennis Tueart	FW	6	2	11 May 1975	Cyprus	4 June 1977	Scotland	
Gordon Hill	FW	6	0	28 May 1976	Italy	12 October 1977	Luxembourg	
Brian Talbot	MF	6	0	28 May 1977	Northern Ireland	31 May 1980	Australia	
Laurie Cunningham	MF	6	0	23 May 1979	Wales	15 October 1980	Romania	
Tony Morley	MF	6	0	18 November 1981	Hungary	17 November 1982	Greece	
Graham Roberts	DF	6	0	28 May 1983	Northern Ireland	2 June 1984	Soviet Union	
John Gregory	MF	6	0	12 June 1983	Australia	2 May 1984	Wales	
Steve Williams	MF	6	0	12 June 1983	Australia	14 November 1984	Turkey	
Jonjo Shelvey	MF	6	0	12 October 2012	San Marino	17 November 2015	France	
Fraser Forster	GK	6	0	15 November 2013	Chile	27 May 2016	Australia	
Lewis Dunk	DF	6	0	15 November 2018	United States	3 June 2024	Bosnia and Herzegovina	
Fikayo Tomori	DF	6	0	17 November 2019	Kosovo	27 March 2026	Uruguay	
Dean Henderson	GK	6	0	12 November 2020	Republic of Ireland	18 July 2026	France	
Curtis Jones	MF	6	1	14 November 2024	Greece	10 June 2025	Senegal	
Tino Livramento	DF	6	0	17 November 2024	Republic of Ireland	6 June 2026	New Zealand	
James Garner	MF	6	0	27 March 2026	Uruguay	12 November 2026	Croatia	
Hubert Heron	FW	5	0	8 March 1873	Scotland	2 March 1878	Scotland	
Clement Mitchell	FW	5	5	15 March 1880	Wales	14 March 1885	Wales	
Jimmy Brown	FW	5	3	26 January 1881	Wales	21 March 1885	Scotland	
Howard Vaughton	FW	5	6	18 January 1882	Ireland	17 March 1884	Wales	
William Rose	GK	5	0	23 January 1884	Ireland	7 March 1891	Ireland	
George Haworth	HB	5	0	5 January 1887	Ireland	5 April 1890	Scotland	
Bob Howarth	FB	5	0	5 January 1887	Ireland	3 March 1894	Ireland	
Harry Allen	HB	5	0	4 January 1888	Wales	5 April 1890	Scotland	
Harry Daft	FW	5	3	2 March 1889	Ireland	5 March 1892	Ireland	
Arthur Henfrey	FW	5	2	7 March 1891	Ireland	4 April 1896	Scotland	
R. Cunliffe Gosling	FW	5	2	5 March 1892	Wales	6 April 1895	Scotland	
Rupert Sandilands	FW	5	3	5 March 1892	Wales	16 March 1896	Wales	
John Willie Sutcliffe	GK	5	0	13 March 1893	Wales	2 March 1903	Wales	
Lewis Vaughan Lodge	FB	5	0	12 March 1894	Wales	4 April 1896	Scotland	
R. E. Foster	FW	5	3	26 March 1900	Wales	3 March 1902	Wales	
Albert Wilkes	HB	5	1	18 March 1901	Wales	3 May 1902	Scotland	
Kelly Houlker	HB	5	0	3 May 1902	Scotland	19 March 1906	Wales	
Tom Baddeley	GK	5	0	14 January 1903	Ireland	9 April 1904	Scotland	
Alex Leake	HB	5	0	12 March 1904	Ireland	1 April 1905	Scotland	
Robert Hawkes	HB	5	0	16 January 1907	Ireland	13 June 1908	Bohemia	
Horace Bailey	GK	5	0	16 March 1908	Wales	13 June 1908	Bohemia	
Bert Freeman	FW	5	3	15 March 1909	Wales	23 March 1912	Scotland	
Fred Pentland	FW	5	0	15 March 1909	Wales	1 June 1909	Austria	
Tom Brittleton	HB	5	0	10 January 1912	Ireland	16 March 1914	Wales	
Joe Smith	FW	5	1	15 January 1913	Ireland	15 March 1920	Wales	
Joe McCall	HB	5	1	17 March 1913	Scotland	23 October 1920	Ireland	
Ephraim Longworth	FB	5	0	10 April 1920	Scotland	14 April 1923	Scotland	
Tom Bromilow	HB	5	0	14 March 1921	Wales	24 October 1925	Ireland	
Tommy Smart	FB	5	0	9 April 1921	Scotland	20 November 1929	Wales	
Jimmy Seed	FW	5	1	21 May 1921	Belgium	4 April 1925	Scotland	
Frank Moss	HB	5	0	22 October 1921	Ireland	12 April 1924	Scotland	
Tommy Magee	HB	5	0	5 March 1923	Wales	21 May 1925	France	
Vic Watson	FW	5	4	5 March 1923	Wales	14 May 1930	Austria	
Bill Ashurst	FB	5	0	21 May 1923	Sweden	4 April 1925	Scotland	
Alfred Bower	FB	5	0	20 October 1923	Ireland	12 January 1927	Wales	
Tommy Johnson	FW	5	5	24 May 1926	Belgium	17 October 1932	Ireland	
Arthur Rigby	FW	5	3	2 April 1927	Scotland	28 November 1927	Wales	
Leonard Barry	FW	5	0	17 May 1928	France	15 May 1929	Spain	
Hugh Adcock	FW	5	1	9 May 1929	France	20 November 1929	Wales	
Tom Waring	FW	5	4	14 May 1931	France	9 April 1932	Scotland	
Ted Drake	FW	5	6	14 November 1934	Italy	26 May 1938	France	
Sam Barkas	FB	5	0	9 May 1936	Belgium	1 December 1937	Czechoslovakia	
Ted Catlin	FB	5	0	17 October 1936	Wales	17 May 1937	Sweden	
Joe Johnson	FW	5	2	18 November 1936	Ireland	20 May 1937	Finland	
Joe Mercer	HB	5	0	16 November 1938	Ireland	24 May 1939	Romania	
Len Shackleton	FW	5	1	26 September 1948	Denmark	1 December 1954	West Germany	
Harold Hassall	FW	5	4	14 April 1951	Scotland	11 November 1953	Ireland	
Billy Elliott	FW	5	3	18 May 1952	Italy	26 November 1952	Belgium	
Ronnie Allen	FW	5	2	28 May 1952	Switzerland	1 December 1954	West Germany	
Albert Quixall	FW	5	0	10 October 1953	Wales	22 May 1955	Portugal	
Frank Blunstone	FW	5	0	10 November 1954	Wales	28 November 1956	Yugoslavia	
Reg Matthews	GK	5	0	14 April 1956	Scotland	6 October 1956	Northern Ireland	
Alan Hodgkinson	GK	5	0	6 April 1957	Scotland	23 November 1960	Wales	
Alan A'Court	FW	5	1	6 November 1957	Northern Ireland	26 November 1958	Wales	
Graham Shaw	FB	5	0	22 October 1958	Soviet Union	21 November 1962	Wales	
Doug Holden	FW	5	0	11 April 1959	Scotland	24 May 1959	Mexico	
Tony Waiters	GK	5	0	24 May 1964	Republic of Ireland	9 December 1964	Netherlands	
Jeff Astle	FW	5	0	7 May 1969	Wales	11 June 1970	Czechoslovakia	
David Nish	DF	5	0	12 May 1973	Scotland	18 May 1974	Northern Ireland	
Stan Bowles	FW	5	1	3 April 1974	Portugal	9 January 1977	Netherlands	
Martin Dobson	MF	5	0	3 April 1974	Portugal	30 October 1974	Czechoslovakia	
Dave Clement	DF	5	0	24 March 1976	Wales	9 January 1977	Netherlands	
Mike Doyle	DF	5	0	24 March 1976	Wales	9 January 1977	Netherlands	
Cyrille Regis	FW	5	0	23 January 1982	Northern Ireland	14 October 1987	Turkey	
Paul Walsh	FW	5	1	12 June 1983	Australia	2 May 1984	Wales	
Clive Allen	FW	5	0	10 June 1984	Brazil	17 January 1988	Israel	
John Salako	MF	5	0	1 June 1991	Australia	11 September 1991	Switzerland	
Chris Powell	DF	5	0	28 January 2001	Spain	13 January 2002	Netherlands	
James Beattie	FW	5	0	12 January 2003	Australia	16 November 2003	Denmark	
Dominic Solanke	FW	5	0	14 November 2017	Brazil	31 March 2026	Japan	
Ainsley Maitland-Niles	DF	5	0	8 September 2020	Denmark	18 November 2020	Iceland	
Aaron Ramsdale	GK	5	0	15 November 2021	San Marino	7 June 2024	Iceland	
Levi Colwill	DF	5	0	13 October 2023	Australia	10 June 2025	Senegal	
Rico Lewis	DF	5	0	20 November 2023	North Macedonia	14 November 2024	Greece	
James Trafford	GK	5	0	27 March 2026	Uruguay	15 November 2026	Spain	
Charles Wollaston	FW	4	1	7 March 1874	Scotland	13 March 1880	Scotland	
George Holden	FW	4	0	12 March 1881	Scotland	17 March 1884	Wales	
Alfred Dobson	FB	4	0	18 January 1882	Ireland	17 March 1884	Wales	
Arthur Dunn	FW	4	2	24 January 1883	Ireland	2 April 1892	Scotland	
Tommy Clare	FB	4	0	2 March 1889	Ireland	7 April 1894	Scotland	
Charles Wreford-Brown	HB	4	0	2 March 1889	Ireland	2 April 1898	Scotland	
George Cotterill	FW	4	2	7 March 1891	Ireland	1 April 1893	Scotland	
Alf Milward	FW	4	3	7 March 1891	Wales	3 April 1897	Scotland	
George Kinsey	HB	4	0	5 March 1892	Wales	16 March 1896	Wales	
George Raikes	GK	4	0	18 March 1895	Wales	4 April 1896	Scotland	
Fred Wheldon	FW	4	6	20 January 1897	Ireland	2 April 1898	Scotland	
George Molyneux	FB	4	0	3 May 1902	Scotland	4 April 1903	Scotland	
Herbert Burgess	FB	4	0	29 January 1904	Wales	7 April 1906	Scotland	
Harold Hardman	FW	4	1	27 March 1905	Wales	16 March 1908	Wales	
Herbert Smith	FB	4	0	27 March 1905	Wales	19 March 1906	Wales	
Harry Makepeace	HB	4	0	7 April 1906	Scotland	23 March 1912	Scotland	
Billy Bradshaw	HB	4	0	12 March 1910	Ireland	17 March 1913	Wales	
Robert Evans	FW	4	1	11 January 1911	Ireland	11 March 1912	Wales	
Harry Hampton	FW	4	2	17 March 1913	Wales	4 April 1914	Scotland	
Thomas Clay	FB	4	0	15 March 1920	Wales	8 April 1922	Scotland	
Alf Quantrill	FW	4	1	15 March 1920	Wales	14 March 1921	Wales	
Frank Osborne	FW	4	3	21 October 1922	Ireland	24 May 1926	Belgium	
Jackie Hegan	FW	4	4	19 March 1923	Belgium	1 November 1923	Belgium	
George Thornewell	FW	4	1	21 May 1923	Sweden	21 May 1925	France	
Thomas Urwin	FW	4	0	21 May 1923	Sweden	1 March 1926	Wales	
Arthur Dorrell	FW	4	1	8 December 1924	Belgium	24 October 1925	Ireland	
Frank Roberts	FW	4	2	8 December 1924	Belgium	21 May 1925	France	
Sid Bishop	HB	4	1	2 April 1927	Scotland	26 May 1927	France	
Ellis Rimmer	FW	4	2	5 April 1930	Scotland	9 December 1931	Spain	
Harry Burgess	FW	4	4	20 October 1930	Ireland	16 May 1931	Belgium	
Eric Keen	HB	4	0	7 December 1932	Austria	2 December 1936	Hungary	
Albert Geldard	FW	4	0	13 May 1933	Italy	23 October 1937	Ireland	
Frank Moss	GK	4	0	14 April 1934	Scotland	14 November 1934	Italy	
Fred Tilson	FW	4	6	10 May 1934	Hungary	19 October 1935	Ireland	
Ted Sagar	GK	4	0	19 October 1935	Ireland	9 May 1936	Belgium	
Jackie Robinson	FW	4	3	20 May 1937	Finland	22 October 1938	Wales	
Willie Watson	HB	4	0	16 November 1949	Ireland	20 November 1950	Yugoslavia	
Redfern Froggatt	FW	4	2	12 November 1952	Wales	8 June 1953	United States	
Johnny Berry	FW	4	0	17 May 1953	Argentina	16 May 1956	Sweden	
Bill McGarry	HB	4	0	20 June 1954	Switzerland	22 October 1955	Wales	
Eddie Clamp	HB	4	0	18 May 1958	Soviet Union	15 June 1958	Austria	
Barry Bridges	FW	4	1	10 April 1965	Scotland	20 October 1965	Austria	
Ian Callaghan	MF	4	0	26 June 1966	Finland	12 October 1977	Luxembourg	
David Sadler	MF	4	0	22 November 1967	Northern Ireland	25 November 1970	East Germany	
Cyril Knowles	DF	4	0	6 December 1967	Soviet Union	1 June 1968	West Germany	
Bob McNab	DF	4	0	6 November 1968	Romania	3 May 1969	Northern Ireland	
Peter Osgood	FW	4	0	25 January 1970	Belgium	14 November 1973	Italy	
Ralph Coates	MF	4	0	21 April 1970	Northern Ireland	19 May 1971	Wales	
Chris Lawler	DF	4	1	12 May 1971	Malta	13 October 1971	Switzerland	
Larry Lloyd	DF	4	0	19 May 1971	Wales	17 May 1980	Wales	
Mike Pejic	DF	4	0	3 April 1974	Portugal	18 May 1974	Scotland	
Keith Weller	FW	4	1	11 May 1974	Wales	22 May 1974	Argentina	
Alec Lindsay	DF	4	0	22 May 1974	Argentina	5 June 1974	Yugoslavia	
Peter Taylor	MF	4	2	24 March 1976	Wales	15 May 1976	Scotland	
Steve Howey	DF	4	0	16 November 1994	Nigeria	27 March 1996	Bulgaria	
Ian Walker	GK	4	0	18 May 1996	Hungary	5 June 2004	Iceland	
Ugo Ehiogu	DF	4	1	23 May 1996	China	27 March 2002	Italy	
Dion Dublin	FW	4	0	11 January 1998	Chile	18 November 1998	Czech Republic	
Scott Carson	GK	4	0	16 November 2007	Austria	15 November 2011	Sweden	
Tom Huddlestone	MF	4	0	14 November 2009	Brazil	14 November 2012	Sweden	
Michael Dawson	DF	4	0	11 August 2010	Hungary	26 March 2011	Wales	
Sam Johnstone	GK	4	0	6 June 2021	Romania	13 October 2023	Australia	
Adam Wharton	MF	4	0	3 June 2024	Bosnia and Herzegovina	27 March 2026	Uruguay	
Angel Gomes	MF	4	0	7 September 2024	Republic of Ireland	17 November 2024	Republic of Ireland	
Rio Ngumoha	FW	4	0	6 June 2026	New Zealand	12 November 2026	Croatia	

== See also ==
- List of England international footballers, covering players with ten or more caps
- List of England international footballers (2–3 caps)
- List of England international footballers with one cap
