= List of England international footballers (2–3 caps) =

The England national football team represents the country of England in international association football. It is fielded by The Football Association, the governing body of football in England, and competes as a member of the Union of European Football Associations (UEFA), which encompasses the countries of Europe. England competed in the first ever official international football match on 30 November 1872, a 0–0 draw with Scotland at Hamilton Crescent.

England have competed in numerous competitions, and all players who have played in two or three matches, either as a member of the starting eleven or as a substitute, are listed below. Each player's details include his usual playing position while with the team, the number of caps earned and goals scored in all international matches, and details of the first and most recent matches played in. The names are initially ordered by number of caps (in descending order), then by date of debut, and then if necessary by alphabetical order. All statistics are correct up to and including the match played on 15 November 2026.

== Key ==
Player
This colour background and the * symbol indicate that the player was active at club level and eligible to play for England on the date specified above.

Positions key
Pre-1960s		1960s–	
GK	Goalkeeper		
FB	Full back	DF	Defender
HB	Half back	MF	Midfielder
FW	Forward		

Position
Playing positions are listed according to the tactical formations that were employed at the time. Thus the change in the names of defensive and midfield positions reflects the tactical evolution that occurred from the 1960s onwards.
Caps and goals
Caps and goals comprise those in the FIFA World Cup and UEFA European Championship, their associated qualification matches and international friendly tournaments and matches.

== Players ==
England national football team players with 2 or 3 caps
Player	Pos.	Caps	Goals	Debut		Last or most recent match		Refs.
Player	Pos.	Caps	Goals	Date	Opponent	Date	Opponent	Refs.
Charles Chenery	FW	3	1	30 November 1872	Scotland	7 March 1874	Scotland	
Beaumont Jarrett	HB	3	0	4 March 1876	Scotland	2 February 1878	Scotland	
Henry Wace	FW	3	0	2 February 1878	Scotland	5 April 1879	Scotland	
Edward Parry	FW	3	1	18 January 1879	Wales	13 March 1882	Wales	
Francis Sparks	FW	3	3	5 April 1879	Scotland	15 March 1880	Wales	
Fred Hargreaves	HB	3	0	15 March 1880	Wales	18 February 1882	Ireland	
Arthur Bambridge	FW	3	1	26 February 1881	Wales	23 February 1884	Ireland	
Arthur Brown	FW	3	4	18 February 1882	Ireland	13 March 1882	Wales	
Alf Jones	FB	3	0	11 March 1882	Scotland	10 March 1883	Scotland	
Percy de Paravicini	FB	3	0	3 February 1883	Wales	10 March 1883	Scotland	
Harry Goodhart	FW	3	0	3 February 1883	Wales	10 March 1883	Scotland	
Joe Beverley	FB	3	0	23 February 1884	Ireland	17 March 1884	Wales	
Benjamin Spilsbury	FW	3	5	28 February 1885	Ireland	27 March 1886	Scotland	
Ralph Squire	HB	3	0	13 March 1886	Ireland	29 March 1886	Wales	
George Brann	FW	3	0	27 March 1886	Scotland	7 March 1891	Wales	
Charlie Mason	FB	3	0	5 February 1887	Ireland	15 March 1890	Ireland	
Bob Roberts	GK	3	0	19 March 1887	Scotland	15 March 1890	Ireland	
Jack Southworth	FW	3	3	23 February 1889	Wales	2 April 1892	Scotland	
John Brodie	FW	3	1	2 March 1889	Ireland	7 March 1891	Ireland	
Charlie Perry	HB	3	0	15 March 1890	Ireland	13 March 1893	Wales	
Harry Wood	FW	3	1	15 March 1890	Wales	4 April 1896	Scotland	
Albert Smith	HB	3	0	7 March 1891	Wales	25 February 1893	Ireland	
Joe Schofield	FW	3	0	5 March 1892	Wales	9 March 1895	Ireland	
Fred Pelly	FB	3	0	25 February 1893	Ireland	7 April 1894	Scotland	
Jimmy Turner	HB	3	0	13 March 1893	Wales	5 March 1898	Ireland	
Leslie Gay	GK	3	0	1 April 1893	Scotland	7 April 1894	Scotland	
Fred Forman	FW	3	2	18 February 1899	Ireland	8 April 1899	Scotland	
Jack Cox	FW	3	0	9 March 1901	Ireland	4 April 1903	Wales	
Fred Blackburn	FW	3	1	30 March 1901	Scotland	9 April 1904	Scotland	
Billy George	GK	3	0	3 March 1902	Wales	3 May 1902	Scotland	
Billy Hogg	FW	3	0	3 March 1902	Wales	3 May 1902	Scotland	
Harry Davis	FW	3	1	14 February 1903	Ireland	4 April 1903	Scotland	
Alf Common	FW	3	2	29 February 1904	Wales	19 March 1906	Wales	
Harry Ruddlesdin	HB	3	0	29 February 1904	Wales	1 April 1905	Scotland	
Samuel Wolstenholme	HB	3	0	9 April 1904	Scotland	27 March 1905	Wales	
Charlie Roberts	HB	3	0	25 February 1905	Ireland	1 April 1905	Ireland	
Jimmy Ashcroft	GK	3	0	17 February 1906	Ireland	7 April 1906	Scotland	
Samuel Day	FW	3	2	17 February 1906	Ireland	7 April 1906	Scotland	
James Stewart	FW	3	2	18 March 1907	Wales	1 April 1911	Scotland	
Watty Corbett	FB	3	0	6 June 1908	Austria	13 June 1908	Bohemia	
George Elliott	FW	3	0	15 February 1913	Ireland	15 March 1920	France	
Joseph Hodkinson	FW	3	0	17 March 1913	Wales	25 October 1919	Ireland	
Charlie Wallace	FW	3	0	17 March 1913	Wales	10 April 1920	Scotland	
Billy Watson	HB	3	0	5 April 1913	Scotland	25 October 1919	Ireland	
Jack Silcock	FB	3	0	14 March 1921	Wales	24 May 1923	Sweden	
Jimmy Dimmock	FW	3	0	9 April 1921	Scotland	24 May 1926	Belgium	
Tommy Lucas	FB	3	0	22 October 1921	Ireland	24 May 1926	Belgium	
Billy Smith	FW	3	0	13 March 1922	Wales	31 March 1928	Scotland	
Norman Bullock	FW	3	2	19 March 1923	Belgium	20 October 1926	Ireland	
Thomas Mort	FB	3	0	3 March 1924	Wales	17 April 1926	Scotland	
Dick Pym	GK	3	0	28 February 1925	Wales	1 March 1926	Wales	
Joe Carter	FW	3	4	24 May 1926	Belgium	15 May 1929	Spain	
Sam Cowan	HB	3	0	24 May 1926	Belgium	16 May 1931	Belgium	
Harry Nuttall	HB	3	0	22 October 1927	Ireland	13 April 1929	Scotland	
Jack Bruton	FW	3	0	17 May 1928	France	13 April 1929	Scotland	
George Stephenson	FW	3	2	17 May 1928	France	14 May 1931	France	
Jack Hacking	GK	3	0	22 October 1928	Ireland	13 April 1929	Scotland	
Edgar Kail	FW	3	2	9 May 1929	France	15 May 1929	Spain	
Joe Peacock	HB	3	0	9 May 1929	France	15 May 1929	Spain	
William Marsden	HB	3	0	20 November 1929	Wales	10 May 1930	Germany	
Maurice Webster	HB	3	0	5 April 1930	Scotland	14 May 1930	Austria	
Jimmy Hampson	FW	3	5	20 October 1930	Ireland	7 December 1932	Austria	
Gordon Hodgson	FW	3	1	20 October 1930	Ireland	28 March 1931	Scotland	
Joe Tate	HB	3	0	14 May 1931	France	16 November 1932	Wales	
Jack Smith	FW	3	4	17 October 1931	Ireland	9 December 1931	Spain	
Charles Gee	HB	3	0	18 November 1931	Wales	18 November 1936	Ireland	
Bobby Barclay	FW	3	2	9 April 1932	Scotland	4 April 1936	Scotland	
Peter O'Dowd	HB	3	0	9 April 1932	Scotland	20 May 1933	Scotland	
Sam Weaver	HB	3	0	9 April 1932	Scotland	1 April 1933	Scotland	
Lewis Stoker	HB	3	0	16 November 1932	Wales	10 May 1934	Hungary	
George Hunt	FW	3	1	1 April 1933	Scotland	20 May 1933	Switzerland	
Jack Bowers	FW	3	2	14 October 1933	Ireland	14 April 1934	Scotland	
Tom Grosvenor	FW	3	2	14 October 1933	Ireland	6 December 1933	France	
Horace Burrows	HB	3	0	10 May 1934	Hungary	18 May 1935	Netherlands	
Walter Boyes	FW	3	0	18 May 1935	Netherlands	26 October 1938	Rest of Europe	
Alf Kirchen	FW	3	2	14 May 1937	Norway	20 May 1937	Finland	
George Mills	FW	3	3	23 October 1937	Ireland	1 December 1937	Czechoslovakia	
Don Welsh	HB	3	1	14 May 1938	Germany	24 May 1939	Romania	
Bill Morris	FB	3	0	16 November 1938	Ireland	24 May 1939	Romania	
Eddie Lowe	HB	3	0	3 May 1947	France	25 May 1947	Portugal	
Phil Taylor	HB	3	0	18 October 1947	Wales	19 November 1947	Sweden	
Jack Howe	FB	3	0	16 May 1948	Italy	9 April 1949	Scotland	
Johnny Hancocks	FW	3	2	2 December 1948	Switzerland	22 November 1950	Yugoslavia	
Johnny Morris	FW	3	3	18 May 1949	Norway	21 September 1949	Republic of Ireland	
Bert Mozley	FB	3	0	21 September 1949	Republic of Ireland	16 November 1949	Ireland	
Laurie Hughes	FB	3	0	25 June 1950	Chile	2 July 1950	Spain	
Malcolm Barrass	HB	3	0	20 October 1951	Wales	18 April 1953	Scotland	
Len Phillips	FW	3	0	14 November 1951	Ireland	1 December 1954	West Germany	
Tommy Garrett	FB	3	0	5 April 1952	Scotland	10 October 1953	Wales	
Syd Owen	HB	3	0	16 May 1954	Yugoslavia	17 June 1954	Belgium	
Ray Wood	GK	3	0	2 October 1954	Northern Ireland	20 May 1956	Finland	
Peter Sillett	FB	3	0	15 May 1955	France	22 May 1955	Portugal	
Ron Baynham	GK	3	0	2 October 1955	Denmark	30 November 1955	Spain	
Bill Perry	FW	3	2	2 November 1955	Northern Ireland	15 April 1956	Scotland	
Johnny Brooks	FW	3	2	14 November 1956	Wales	5 December 1956	Denmark	
Jim Langley	FB	3	0	19 April 1958	Scotland	11 May 1958	Yugoslavia	
Peter Brabrook	FW	3	0	17 June 1958	Soviet Union	15 May 1960	Spain	
Warren Bradley	FW	3	2	6 May 1959	Italy	28 May 1959	United States	
Tony Allen	FB	3	0	17 October 1959	Wales	18 November 1959	Northern Ireland	
Edwin Holliday	FW	3	0	17 October 1959	Wales	18 November 1959	Northern Ireland	
Ray Pointer	FW	3	2	28 September 1961	Luxembourg	25 October 1961	Portugal	
Alan Hinton	FW	3	1	3 October 1962	France	18 November 1964	Wales	
Bobby Tambling	FW	3	1	21 November 1962	Wales	4 May 1966	Australia	
Fred Pickering	FW	3	5	27 May 1964	United States	21 October 1964	Belgium	
Mick Jones	FW	3	0	12 May 1965	West Germany	14 January 1970	Netherlands	
Paul Reaney	DF	3	0	11 December 1968	Bulgaria	3 February 1971	Malta	
Gordon West	GK	3	0	11 December 1968	Bulgaria	1 June 1969	Mexico	
Ian Gillard	DF	3	0	12 March 1975	West Germany	30 October 1975	Czechoslovakia	
Tony Towers	MF	3	0	8 May 1976	Wales	28 May 1976	Italy	
Garry Birtles	FW	3	0	13 May 1980	Argentina	15 October 1980	Romania	
David Armstrong	MF	3	0	31 May 1980	Australia	2 May 1984	Wales	
Steve Foster	DF	3	0	23 February 1982	Northern Ireland	25 June 1982	Kuwait	
Ricky Hill	MF	3	0	22 September 1982	Denmark	29 January 1986	Egypt	
Derek Statham	DF	3	0	23 February 1983	Wales	15 June 1983	Australia	
Paul Bracewell	MF	3	0	12 June 1985	West Germany	13 November 1985	Northern Ireland	
David Hirst	FW	3	1	1 June 1991	Australia	19 February 1992	France	
Earl Barrett	DF	3	0	3 June 1991	New Zealand	19 June 1993	Germany	
Brian Deane	FW	3	0	3 June 1991	New Zealand	9 September 1992	Spain	
Paul Stewart	MF	3	0	11 September 1991	Germany	29 April 1992	CIS	
Keith Curle	DF	3	0	29 April 1992	CIS	11 June 1992	Denmark	
Warren Barton	DF	3	0	15 February 1995	Republic of Ireland	11 June 1995	Brazil	
Stan Collymore	FW	3	0	3 June 1995	Japan	10 September 1997	Moldova	
John Scales	DF	3	0	3 June 1995	Japan	11 June 1995	Brazil	
Jason Wilcox	MF	3	0	18 May 1996	Hungary	23 February 2000	Argentina	
Tim Sherwood	MF	3	0	27 March 1999	Poland	5 June 1999	Sweden	
Michael Gray	DF	3	0	28 April 1999	Hungary	9 June 1999	Bulgaria	
Gabriel Agbonlahor	FW	3	0	19 November 2008	Germany	14 October 2009	Belarus	
Jack Rodwell	MF	3	0	12 November 2011	Spain	2 June 2013	Brazil	
Calum Chambers *	DF	3	0	3 September 2014	Norway	12 October 2014	Estonia	
Danny Ings *	FW	3	1	12 October 2015	Lithuania	8 October 2020	Wales	
Danny Drinkwater	MF	3	0	29 March 2016	Netherlands	27 May 2016	Australia	
Tom Heaton *	GK	3	0	27 May 2016	Australia	13 June 2017	France	
Aaron Cresswell *	DF	3	0	15 November 2016	Spain	8 October 2017	Lithuania	
Callum Hudson-Odoi *	FW	3	0	22 March 2019	Czech Republic	17 November 2019	Kosovo	
Emile Smith Rowe *	MF	3	1	12 November 2021	Albania	29 March 2022	Ivory Coast	
Jarrad Branthwaite *	DF	3	0	3 June 2024	Bosnia and Herzegovina	6 October 2026	Czech Republic	
Trevoh Chalobah *	DF	3	0	10 June 2025	Senegal	29 September 2026	Czech Republic	
Harwood Greenhalgh	FB	2	0	30 November 1872	Scotland	8 March 1873	Scotland	
William Maynard	FW	2	0	30 November 1872	Scotland	4 March 1876	Scotland	
Cuthbert Ottaway	FW	2	0	30 November 1872	Scotland	7 March 1874	Scotland	
Reginald Courtenay Welch	GK	2	0	30 November 1872	Scotland	7 March 1874	Scotland	
Alexander Bonsor	FW	2	1	8 March 1873	Scotland	6 March 1875	Scotland	
William Clegg	FW	2	0	8 March 1873	Scotland	18 January 1879	Wales	
Pelham von Donop	FW	2	0	8 March 1873	Scotland	6 March 1875	Scotland	
Francis Birley	HB	2	0	7 March 1874	Scotland	6 March 1875	Scotland	
William Rawson	HB	2	0	6 March 1875	Scotland	3 March 1877	Scotland	
Edgar Field	FB	2	0	4 March 1876	Scotland	12 March 1881	Scotland	
Lindsay Bury	FB	2	0	3 March 1877	Scotland	18 January 1879	Wales	
Claude Wilson	FB	2	0	18 January 1879	Wales	12 March 1881	Scotland	
William Brindle	FB	2	1	13 March 1880	Scotland	15 March 1880	Wales	
Edwin Luntley	FB	2	0	13 March 1880	Scotland	15 March 1880	Wales	
Edward Johnson	FW	2	2	15 March 1880	Wales	23 February 1884	Ireland	
Thomas Marshall	FW	2	0	15 March 1880	Wales	26 February 1881	Wales	
John Hargreaves	FW	2	0	26 February 1881	Wales	12 March 1881	Scotland	
John Hawtrey	GK	2	0	26 February 1881	Wales	12 March 1881	Scotland	
Thurston Rostron	FW	2	0	26 February 1881	Wales	12 March 1881	Scotland	
Doctor Greenwood	FB	2	0	18 February 1882	Ireland	11 March 1882	Scotland	
Harry Moore	FB	2	0	24 February 1883	Ireland	14 March 1885	Wales	
Francis Pawson	FW	2	1	24 February 1883	Ireland	28 February 1885	Ireland	
Oliver Whateley	FW	2	2	24 February 1883	Ireland	10 March 1883	Scotland	
William Bromley-Davenport	FW	2	2	15 March 1884	Scotland	17 March 1884	Wales	
William Gunn	FW	2	1	15 March 1884	Scotland	17 March 1884	Wales	
Charles Plumpton Wilson	HB	2	0	15 March 1884	Scotland	17 March 1884	Wales	
Kenny Davenport	FW	2	2	14 March 1885	Wales	15 March 1890	Ireland	
Andrew Amos	HB	2	0	21 March 1885	Scotland	29 March 1886	Wales	
Dickie Baugh	FB	2	0	13 March 1886	Ireland	15 March 1890	Ireland	
Cecil Holden-White	HB	2	0	4 February 1888	Wales	17 March 1888	Scotland	
George Woodhall	FW	2	1	4 February 1888	Wales	17 March 1888	Scotland	
Albert Aldridge	FB	2	0	31 March 1888	Ireland	2 March 1889	Ireland	
Albert Fletcher	HB	2	0	23 February 1889	Wales	15 March 1890	Wales	
William Townley	FW	2	2	23 February 1889	Wales	15 March 1890	Ireland	
Bill Rowley	GK	2	0	2 March 1889	Ireland	5 March 1892	Ireland	
Davie Weir	HB	2	2	2 March 1889	Ireland	13 April 1889	Scotland	
Edmund Currey	FW	2	2	15 March 1890	Wales	5 April 1890	Scotland	
Fred Geary	FW	2	3	15 March 1890	Ireland	6 April 1891	Scotland	
Alf Underwood	HB	2	0	7 March 1891	Ireland	5 March 1892	Ireland	
Jack Devey	FW	2	1	5 March 1892	Ireland	1 March 1894	Ireland	
Anthony Hossack	HB	2	0	5 March 1892	Wales	12 March 1894	Wales	
George Toone	GK	2	0	5 March 1892	Wales	2 April 1892	Scotland	
William Winckworth	HB	2	1	5 March 1892	Wales	25 February 1893	Ireland	
Alban Harrison	HB	2	0	5 March 1892	Ireland	1 April 1893	Scotland	
Robert Topham	FW	2	0	5 March 1892	Ireland	12 April 1894	Wales	
Jimmy Whitehead	FW	2	0	13 March 1893	Wales	3 March 1894	Ireland	
Frank Becton	FW	2	2	9 March 1895	Ireland	29 March 1897	Wales	
Rab Howell	HB	2	1	9 March 1895	Ireland	8 April 1899	Scotland	
Tom Booth	HB	2	0	28 March 1898	Wales	7 April 1903	Scotland	
Harry Thickitt	HB	2	0	20 March 1899	Wales	8 April 1899	Scotland	
Charlie Sagar	FW	2	1	17 March 1900	Ireland	3 March 1902	Wales	
Archie Turner	FW	2	0	17 March 1900	Ireland	9 March 1901	Ireland	
Arthur Chadwick	HB	2	0	26 March 1900	Wales	7 April 1900	Scotland	
Geoffrey Plumpton Wilson	HB	2	1	26 March 1900	Wales	7 April 1900	Scotland	
Billy Bannister	HB	2	0	18 March 1901	Wales	22 March 1902	Ireland	
Billy Beats	FW	2	0	18 March 1901	Wales	3 May 1902	Scotland	
Walter Bennett	FW	2	0	18 March 1901	Wales	30 March 1901	Scotland	
James Iremonger	FB	2	0	30 March 1901	Scotland	22 March 1902	Ireland	
Jack Sharp	FW	2	1	14 February 1903	Ireland	1 April 1905	Scotland	
Billy Brawn	FW	2	0	29 February 1904	Wales	12 March 1904	Ireland	
Arthur Brown	FW	2	1	29 February 1904	Ireland	17 February 1906	Wales	
George Davis	FW	2	1	29 February 1904	Wales	12 March 1904	Ireland	
Jack Carr	FB	2	0	25 February 1905	Ireland	16 February 1907	Ireland	
Harry Linacre	GK	2	0	17 March 1905	Wales	1 April 1905	Scotland	
Albert Shepherd	FW	2	2	7 April 1906	Scotland	11 February 1911	Ireland	
Jack Parkinson	FW	2	0	14 March 1910	Wales	2 April 1910	Scotland	
Albert Sturgess	HB	2	0	11 February 1911	Ireland	4 April 1914	Scotland	
Kenneth Hunt	HB	2	0	13 March 1911	Wales	1 April 1911	Scotland	
George Webb	FW	2	1	13 March 1911	Wales	1 April 1911	Scotland	
Jackie Mordue	FW	2	0	10 February 1912	Ireland	15 February 1913	Ireland	
Frank Jefferis	FW	2	0	11 March 1912	Wales	23 March 1912	Scotland	
Francis Cuggy	HB	2	0	15 February 1913	Ireland	14 February 1914	Ireland	
Eddie Latheron	FW	2	1	17 March 1913	Wales	14 February 1914	Ireland	
Danny Shea	FW	2	0	14 February 1914	Ireland	16 March 1914	Wales	
Bobby McNeal	HB	2	0	16 March 1914	Wales	4 April 1914	Scotland	
Eddie Mosscrop	FW	2	0	16 March 1914	Wales	4 April 1914	Scotland	
Fanny Walden	FW	2	0	4 April 1914	Scotland	13 March 1922	Wales	
Jackie Carr	FW	2	0	25 October 1919	Ireland	3 March 1923	Wales	
Jack Cock	FW	2	2	25 October 1919	Ireland	10 April 1920	Scotland	
Joe Smith	FB	2	0	25 October 1919	Ireland	21 October 1922	Ireland	
Fred Morris	FW	2	1	10 April 1920	Scotland	23 October 1920	Ireland	
Bert Smith	HB	2	0	9 April 1921	Scotland	13 March 1922	Wales	
George Harrison	FW	2	0	21 May 1921	Belgium	22 October 1921	Ireland	
Benjamin Howard Baker	GK	2	0	21 May 1921	Belgium	24 October 1925	Ireland	
Jerry Dawson	GK	2	0	22 October 1921	Ireland	8 April 1922	Scotland	
Bill Rawlings	FW	2	0	13 March 1922	Wales	8 April 1922	Scotland	
Fred Titmuss	FB	2	0	13 March 1922	Wales	5 March 1923	Wales	
Richard York	FW	2	0	8 April 1922	Scotland	17 April 1926	Scotland	
Jack Harrow	FB	2	0	21 October 1922	Ireland	21 May 1923	Sweden	
David Mercer	FW	2	1	21 October 1922	Ireland	19 March 1923	Belgium	
Owen Williams	FW	2	0	21 October 1922	Ireland	5 March 1923	Wales	
Jack Tresadern	HB	2	0	14 April 1923	Scotland	21 May 1923	Sweden	
Harry Bedford	FW	2	1	21 May 1923	Sweden	22 October 1924	Ireland	
Basil Patchitt	HB	2	0	21 May 1923	Sweden	24 May 1923	Sweden	
Ernest Williamson	GK	2	0	21 May 1923	Sweden	24 May 1923	Sweden	
Tommy Roberts	FW	2	2	1 November 1923	Belgium	3 March 1924	Wales	
Charlie Spencer	HB	2	0	12 April 1924	Scotland	28 February 1925	Wales	
Stan Earle	FW	2	0	17 May 1924	France	22 October 1927	Ireland	
Fred Ewer	HB	2	0	17 May 1924	France	8 December 1924	Belgium	
Vivian Gibbins	FW	2	3	17 May 1924	France	21 May 1925	France	
Harry Storer	FW	2	1	17 May 1924	France	22 October 1927	Ireland	
Henry Healless	HB	2	0	22 October 1924	Ireland	31 March 1928	Scotland	
Leonard Graham	HB	2	0	28 February 1925	Wales	4 April 1925	Scotland	
John Townrow	HB	2	0	4 April 1925	Scotland	1 March 1926	Wales	
Syd Puddefoot	FW	2	0	24 October 1925	Ireland	17 April 1926	Scotland	
Joe Spence	FW	2	1	24 May 1926	Belgium	20 October 1926	Ireland	
Vincent Matthews	HB	2	1	17 May 1928	France	19 May 1928	Belgium	
Ben Olney	GK	2	0	17 May 1928	France	19 May 1928	Belgium	
Tony Leach	HB	2	0	20 October 1930	Ireland	22 November 1930	Wales	
Tommy Graham	HB	2	0	14 May 1931	France	17 October 1931	Ireland	
Hugh Turner	GK	2	0	14 May 1931	France	16 May 1931	Belgium	
Arthur Cunliffe	FW	2	0	17 October 1932	Ireland	16 November 1932	Wales	
Ronnie Starling	FW	2	0	1 April 1933	Scotland	17 April 1937	Scotland	
Jimmy Richardson	FW	2	2	13 May 1933	Italy	29 May 1933	Switzerland	
Jimmy Allen	HB	2	0	14 October 1933	Ireland	15 November 1933	Wales	
Tommy Gardner	HB	2	0	16 May 1934	Czechoslovakia	18 May 1935	Netherlands	
Fred Worrall	FW	2	2	18 May 1935	Netherlands	18 November 1936	Ireland	
Harold Hobbis	FW	2	1	6 May 1936	Austria	9 May 1936	Belgium	
Dick Spence	FW	2	0	6 May 1936	Austria	9 May 1936	Belgium	
George Holdcroft	GK	2	0	17 October 1936	Wales	18 November 1936	Ireland	
Tom Galley	FW	2	1	14 May 1937	Norway	17 May 1937	Sweden	
Eric Stephenson	FW	2	0	9 April 1938	Scotland	16 November 1938	Ireland	
Reg Smith	FW	2	2	9 November 1938	Scotland	16 November 1938	Ireland	
Tim Ward	HB	2	0	21 September 1947	Belgium	10 November 1948	Wales	
Bill Ellerington	FB	2	0	18 May 1949	Norway	22 May 1949	France	
Peter Harris	FW	2	0	21 September 1949	Republic of Ireland	23 May 1954	Hungary	
Bill Jones	HB	2	0	14 May 1950	Portugal	18 May 1950	Belgium	
Allenby Chilton	HB	2	0	7 October 1950	Ireland	3 October 1951	France	
Leslie Compton	HB	2	0	15 November 1950	Wales	27 November 1950	Yugoslavia	
Vic Metcalfe	FW	2	0	9 May 1951	Argentina	19 May 1951	Portugal	
Jim Taylor	HB	2	0	9 May 1951	Argentina	19 May 1951	Portugal	
Tommy Thompson	FW	2	0	20 October 1951	Wales	6 April 1957	Scotland	
Johnny Nicholls	FW	2	1	3 April 1954	Scotland	16 May 1954	Yugoslavia	
Bedford Jezzard	FW	2	0	23 May 1954	Hungary	2 November 1955	Northern Ireland	
Gordon Astall	FW	2	1	20 May 1956	Finland	26 May 1956	West Germany	
Wilf McGuinness	HB	2	0	4 October 1958	Northern Ireland	24 May 1959	Mexico	
Norman Deeley	FW	2	0	13 May 1959	Brazil	17 May 1959	Peru	
Brian Clough	FW	2	0	17 October 1959	Wales	28 October 1959	Sweden	
Trevor Smith	HB	2	0	17 October 1959	Wales	28 October 1959	Sweden	
Ray Parry	FW	2	1	18 November 1959	Northern Ireland	19 April 1960	Scotland	
Dennis Viollet	FW	2	1	22 May 1960	Hungary	28 September 1961	Luxembourg	
Ray Crawford	FW	2	1	22 November 1961	Northern Ireland	4 April 1962	Austria	
Stan Anderson	HB	2	0	4 April 1962	Austria	14 April 1962	Scotland	
Mike Hellawell	FW	2	0	3 October 1962	France	20 October 1962	Northern Ireland	
Fred Hill	FW	2	0	20 October 1962	Northern Ireland	21 November 1962	Wales	
Michael O'Grady	FW	2	3	20 October 1962	Northern Ireland	12 March 1969	France	
Gerry Byrne	FB	2	0	6 April 1963	Scotland	29 June 1966	Norway	
Jimmy Melia	FW	2	1	6 April 1963	Scotland	5 June 1963	Switzerland	
Mike Bailey	HB	2	0	27 May 1964	United States	18 November 1965	Wales	
Terry Venables	FW	2	0	21 October 1964	Belgium	9 December 1964	Netherlands	
Frank Wignall	FW	2	2	15 November 1964	Wales	9 December 1964	Netherlands	
John Radford	MF	2	0	15 January 1969	Romania	13 October 1971	Switzerland	
Brian Kidd	FW	2	1	21 April 1970	Ireland	24 May 1970	Mexico	
Frank Lampard Sr.	DF	2	0	11 October 1972	Yugoslavia	31 May 1980	Australia	
Kevin Hector	FW	2	0	17 October 1973	Poland	14 November 1973	Italy	
Alan Hudson	MF	2	0	12 March 1975	West Germany	16 April 1975	Cyprus	
Colin Viljoen	MF	2	0	17 May 1975	Northern Ireland	21 May 1975	Wales	
Kevin Reeves	FW	2	0	22 November 1979	Bulgaria	20 May 1980	Northern Ireland	
Eric Gates	MF	2	0	10 September 1980	Norway	15 October 1980	Romania	
Mark Barham	MF	2	0	12 June 1983	Australia	15 June 1983	Australia	
Danny Thomas	DF	2	0	12 June 1983	Australia	15 June 1983	Australia	
Alan Kennedy	DF	2	0	4 April 1984	Northern Ireland	2 May 1984	Wales	
Steve Hunt	MF	2	0	26 May 1984	Scotland	2 June 1984	Soviet Union	
Gary Bailey	GK	2	0	26 March 1985	Republic of Ireland	9 June 1985	Mexico	
Mick Harford	FW	2	0	17 February 1988	Israel	14 September 1988	Denmark	
Michael Thomas	MF	2	0	16 November 1988	Saudi Arabia	13 December 1989	Yugoslavia	
John Fashanu	FW	2	0	23 May 1989	Chile	27 May 1989	Scotland	
Dave Beasant	GK	2	0	15 November 1989	Italy	13 December 1989	Yugoslavia	
Nigel Winterburn	DF	2	0	15 November 1989	Italy	19 June 1993	Germany	
Gary Charles	DF	2	0	8 June 1991	New Zealand	12 June 1991	Malaysia	
David Bardsley	DF	2	0	9 September 1992	Spain	29 May 1993	Poland	
Stuart Ripley	MF	2	0	17 November 1993	San Marino	18 September 1997	Moldova	
Steve Bould	DF	2	0	17 May 1994	Greece	22 May 1994	Norway	
Barry Venison	DF	2	0	7 September 1994	United States	29 March 1995	Uruguay	
Colin Cooper	DF	2	0	8 June 1995	Sweden	11 June 1995	Brazil	
Richard Wright	GK	2	0	3 June 2000	Malta	15 August 2001	Netherlands	
Paul Konchesky	DF	2	0	12 February 2003	Australia	12 November 2005	Argentina	
Zat Knight	DF	2	0	28 May 2005	United States	31 May 2005	Colombia	
Nicky Shorey	DF	2	0	1 June 2007	Brazil	22 August 2007	Germany	
Stephen Warnock	DF	2	0	1 June 2008	Trinidad and Tobago	17 November 2010	France	
Bobby Zamora	FW	2	0	11 August 2010	Hungary	15 November 2011	Sweden	
Leon Osman	MF	2	0	14 November 2012	Sweden	22 March 2013	San Marino	
Wilfried Zaha	MF	2	0	14 November 2012	Sweden	14 August 2013	Scotland	
James Tarkowski *	DF	2	0	27 March 2018	Italy	11 September 2018	Switzerland	
Harvey Barnes *	FW	2	0	8 October 2020	Wales	27 March 2026	Uruguay	
Ben Godfrey *	DF	2	0	2 June 2021	Austria	6 June 2021	Romania	
Tyrick Mitchell *	DF	2	0	26 March 2022	Switzerland	29 March 2022	Ivory Coast	
Kyle Walker-Peters *	DF	2	0	26 March 2022	Switzerland	29 March 2022	Ivory Coast	
Alex Scott *	MF	2	0	29 September 2026	Czech Republic	3 October 2026	Croatia	

== See also ==
- List of England international footballers, covering players with ten or more caps
- List of England international footballers (4–9 caps)
- List of England international footballers with one cap
