= Alfred Maynard =

England international rugby union player (1894–1916)

Alfred Frederick Maynard
- Born: 23 March 1894
- Died: 13 November 1916 (aged 22); Beaumont-Hamel, France
- Father: William Maynard

Rugby union career
International career
| Years | Team | Apps | (Points) |
| 1914 | England | 3 | (0) |
- Military career
- Allegiance: United Kingdom
- Branch: British Army
- Service years: 1914-1916
- Rank: Lieutenant
- Unit: Royal Naval Division
- Conflicts: World War I; Battle of the Somme †
- Memorials: Thiepval Memorial

Alfred Frederick Maynard (23 March 1894 – 13 November 1916 (aged 22)) was an English rugby union player. He was the son of William Maynard, former international association footballer. He won 3 caps as a hooker in the 1914 Five Nations Championship. He was killed at Beaumont Hamel in the First World War when serving as a lieutenant in the Royal Naval Division and is commemorated on the Thiepval Memorial.
