= John Sandys =

John Sandys may refer to:

- John Sandys (classicist) (1844–1922), English classical scholar
- John Sandys (MP) for Hampshire (UK Parliament constituency)
- John Sandys (priest) (died 1586), English Roman Catholic priest

== See also ==
- John Sands (disambiguation)
