= John Sands (footballer) =

English footballer

John Sands (4 March 1859 – 29 February 1924) was an English footballer who played as a goalkeeper for Nottingham Forest before the advent of League football, and made one appearance for the England national team.

== Career ==
Sands was born in Nottingham and played junior football in the town before joining Nottingham Forest in 1878, shortly before his club debut. At that time Forest were not playing in a recognised league so matches were either "friendlies" or FA Cup matches. Sands helped them reach the FA Cup semi-finals in 1879 (lost 2–1 to Old Etonians) and 1880 (lost 1–0 to Oxford University).

Shortly before the 1880 semi-final (played on 27 March 1880), Sands was selected for his only appearance for England away to Wales on 15 March. Sands was one of six players who made their England debut in this match which England won 3–2 with two goals scored by Francis Sparks of Clapham Rovers. Thomas Brindle had to leave the game in the second half due to injury, and England played on with ten men.

Sands continued to play for Nottingham Forest until 1883, his final recorded appearance being in an FA Cup replay in January 1883.

There is little recorded about his career outside football.
