= Robert Barker (footballer) =

English footballer (1847–1915)

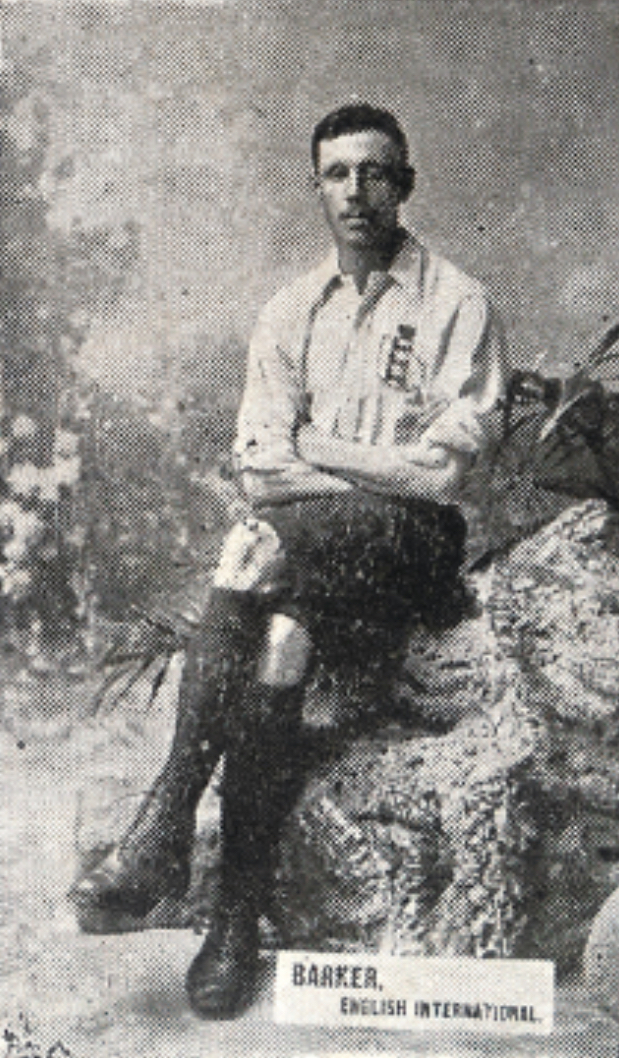

Personal information
- Full name: Robert Barker
- Date of birth: 19 June 1847
- Place of birth: Wouldham, England
- Date of death: 11 November 1915 (aged 68)
- Place of death: Watford, England
- Positions: Goalkeeper; forward

Senior career*
Years	Team	Apps	(Gls)
- Hertfordshire Rangers
- Wanderers

International career
1872	England	1	(0)
- * Club domestic league appearances and goals

Robert Barker (19 June 1847 – 11 November 1915) was an English footballer who played for England, first in goal and later as a forward, in the first international match against Scotland.

== Career ==
Barker was born in Wouldham, Kent and was educated at Marlborough College where he played both rugby and association football. After leaving school he joined Hertfordshire Rangers to concentrate on "soccer". He represented both Middlesex and Kent during his career, as well as making occasional appearances for Westminster School and Wanderers.

He was selected to play in goal for England's first ever international match against Scotland on 30 November 1872. The original selection for goalkeeper, Alexander Morten, was unavailable and, according to Graham Betts in "England – Player by player", "Barker was chosen (to play in goal) because he was the biggest and slowest player in the England team and because his rugby experience and handling of the ball would come in useful" Barker kept a clean sheet for the first half and at some point in the game he switched places with William Maynard. At 25 years, 165 days Barker was the oldest player in the England line-up.

As he was in goal and therefore first in the lineup for England's first international match, Barker officially has legacy number 1 for England.

Barker was not selected for any further internationals and went on to pursue a career as a civil engineer, later becoming Chief Assistant Engineer to the London, Chatham and Dover Railway and then the South Eastern Railway.

He died on 11 November 1915, aged 68.
