= William Maynard (footballer) =

English footballer

William John Maynard (18 March 1853 – 2 September 1921) was an English footballer who played for England, firstly as a forward and later in goal, in the first international match against Scotland.

== Career ==
Maynard was born in London and joined the 1st Surrey Rifles F.C. based in Flodden Road, Camberwell.

He was selected to play as a forward for England's first ever international match against Scotland on 30 November 1872 but at some point in the game he switched places with Robert Barker in goal and, like Barker, kept a clean sheet in a goalless draw. At 19 years, 157 days Maynard was the youngest player in the England line-up.

His second and last international appearance came on 4 March 1876 when he played on the left wing in a 3–0 defeat by Scotland.

In 1877 he represented Surrey and later spent a year with the Wanderers.

After retiring from his football career, he served as a District Registrar in Durham from 1903 until his death on 2 September 1921 aged 68.

His son Alfred Maynard represented England at rugby and was killed in the First World War.
