= Tom Urwin (footballer) =

English footballer

Personal information
- Full name: Tom Urwin
- Date of birth: 5 February 1896
- Place of birth: Haswell, England
- Date of death: 7 May 1968 (aged 72)
- Place of death: Monkseaton, England
- Height: 5 ft 6 in (1.68 m)
- Position: Outside forward

Youth career
- Fulwell
- Lambton Star

Senior career*
| Years | Team | Apps | (Gls) |
| 1913–1914 | Shildon | | |
| 1914–1924 | Middlesbrough | | |
| 1924–1930 | Newcastle United | 188 | (23) |
| 1930–1936 | Sunderland | 50 | (5) |
| Total | | 238+ | (28+) |

International career
| 1923–1926 | England | 4 | (0) |
- * Club domestic league appearances and goals

Tom Urwin (5 February 1896 – 7 May 1968) was an English international footballer who played as an outside forward.

== Early and personal life ==
Tom Irwin was born in Haswell, County Durham on 5 February 1896. Urwin was one of ten children, of whom 5 had died young. His father was a 'rope inspector' and later a 'winding engine man' at Ryhope Colliery, and the family lived in the Ryhope area of Sunderland. By 1911, Urwin was also woking at the Colliery, as an 'engine fitter'. Urwin served as a gunner in the Royal Field Artillery during the First World War and saw action at Gallipoli and in India. Urwin was married with one son.

== Career ==
Urwin spent his early career with Fulwell, Lambton Star, and Shildon, where he turned professional in February 1914. He signed for Middlesbrough in May 1914.

He transferred to Newcastle United in August 1924 for a £3,200 fee. At Newcastle he made 200 appearances in all competitions, scoring 24 goals. He won the 1926–27 league championship with Newcastle, and also earned Football League representative honours.

He finished his career with Sunderland, signing for them in February 1930 for a £525 transfer fee. His final appearance for the club was in April 1935, where he became the club's oldest ever player at the age of 39 years and 76 days. At Sunderland he made 55 appearances in all competitions, scoring 6 goals. He retired from playing in 1936.

Urwin earned four caps for England between 1923 and 1926.

== Late life and death ==
By 1939 he was working as a football trainer and masseuse. He was a coach and scout at Sunderland.

Urwin later worked as a hospital clerk, retiring in 1962. He died on 7 May 1968 in Monkseaton.
