= List of England international footballers capped while playing for a lower division club =

The England national football team represents the country of England in international association football. It is fielded by The Football Association, the governing body of football in England, and competes as a member of the Union of European Football Associations (UEFA), which encompasses the countries of Europe. England competed in the first official international football match on 30 November 1872, a 0–0 draw with Scotland at Hamilton Crescent.

England have competed in numerous competitions, and all players who have been capped while playing for clubs not in the top division of English football, either as a member of the starting eleven or as a substitute, are listed below. Each player's details include his usual playing position while with the team, the number of caps earned and the years spent playing for England while also playing for a Football League club. For example, Trevor Brooking was capped 47 times, but 12 of those caps were when West Ham United were in the Second Division. The names are initially ordered by the year of debut, and then by alphabetical order.

== Players ==
=== Players from non-League clubs ===
Player	Pos.	Club	League	Years	Caps	Refs.
Alfred Bower	DF	Corinthians	-	1923–27	5	
William Bryant	MF	Clapton	Isthmian League	1925	1	
Vivian Gibbins	FW	Clapton	Isthmian League	1925	1	
Claude Ashton	FW	Corinthians	-	1925	1	
Edgar Kail	MF	Dulwich Hamlet	Isthmian League	1929	3	
Bernard Joy	DF	Casuals	Isthmian League	1936	1	

=== Players from Third Division clubs ===
Player	Pos.	Club	League	Years	Caps	Refs.
Freddie Fox	GK	Millwall	Third Division South	1925	1	
George Armitage	MF	Charlton Athletic	Third Division South	1925	1	
Richard Hill	DF	Millwall	Third Division South	1926	1	
Len Oliver	MF	Fulham	Third Division South	1929	1	
Albert Barrett	MF	Fulham	Third Division South	1929	1	
Joe Payne	FW	Luton Town	Third Division South	1937	1	
Tommy Lawton	FW	Notts County	Third Division South	1947–48	5 (23)	
Reg Matthews	GK	Coventry City	Third Division South	1956–57	5	
Johnny Byrne	FW	Crystal Palace	Third Division	1961	1 (11)	
Peter Taylor	MF	Crystal Palace	Third Division	1976	4	
Steve Bull	FW	Wolverhampton Wanderers	Third Division	1989	2 (13)	

=== Players from Second Division clubs ===
Player	Pos.	Club	League	Years	Caps	Refs.
Fred Kean	MF	The Wednesday	Second Division	1923–26	6 (9)	
George Thornewell	FW	Derby County	Second Division	1923–25	4	
Billy Felton	DF	The Wednesday	Second Division	1925	1	
Tom Parker	DF	Southampton	Second Division	1925	1	
Howard Baker	GK	Chelsea	Second Division	1925	1 (2)	
John Townrow	MF	Clapton Orient	Second Division	1925–26	2	
Billy Pease	FW	Middlesbrough	Second Division	1927	1	
Willis Edwards	MF	Leeds United	Second Division	1928	3 (16)	
Jack Hacking	GK	Oldham Athletic	Second Division	1928–29	3	
George Camsell	FW	Middlesbrough	Second Division	1929	2 (9)	
Joe Peacock	MF	Middlesbrough	Second Division	1929	3	
Joe Carter	FW	West Bromwich Albion	Second Division	1929	2 (3)	
Dixie Dean	FW	Everton	Second Division	1931	1 (16)	
Harry Roberts	FW	Millwall	Second Division	1931	1	
Tommy Graham	DF	Nottingham Forest	Second Division	1931	2	
Johnny Arnold	FW	Fulham	Second Division	1933	1	
George Hunt	FW	Tottenham Hotspur	Second Division	1933	3	
Ray Westwood	FW	Bolton Wanderers	Second Division	1934–35	3 (6)	
George Eastham	FW	Bolton Wanderers	Second Division	1935	1	
Sep Smith	MF	Leicester City	Second Division	1935	1	
Bobby Barclay	FW	Sheffield United	Second Division	1936	1 (3)	
Harold Hobbis	FW	Charlton Athletic	Second Division	1936	2	
Ronnie Starling	FW	Aston Villa	Second Division	1937	1 (2)	
Len Goulden	FW	West Ham United	Second Division	1937–39	14	
Willie Hall	FW	Tottenham Hotspur	Second Division	1937–39	9 (10)	
Jackie Robinson	FW	Sheffield Wednesday	Second Division	1937–38	4	
Jackie Morton	FW	West Ham United	Second Division	1937	1	
Frank Broome	FW	Aston Villa	Second Division	1938	3 (7)	
Bert Sproston	DF	Tottenham Hotspur; Manchester City	Second Division	1938; 1938	2 (11); 1 (11)	
Reg Smith	FW	Millwall	Second Division	1938	2	
Frank Swift	GK	Manchester City	Second Division	1946–47	8 (19)	
Ted Ditchburn	GK	Tottenham Hotspur	Second Division	1948–49	2 (6)	
Alf Ramsey	DF	Southampton; Tottenham Hotspur	Second Division	1948; 1949–50	1 (32); 7 (32)	
Jack Haines	FW	West Bromwich Albion	Second Division	1948	1	
Bill Ellerington	DF	Southampton	Second Division	1949	2	
Tom Finney	FW	Preston North End	Second Division	1949–51	14 (76)	
Bernard Streten	GK	Luton Town	Second Division	1949	1	
Bill Eckersley	DF	Blackburn Rovers	Second Division	1950–53	17	
Gil Merrick	GK	Birmingham City	Second Division	1951–54	23	
Jackie Sewell	FW	Sheffield Wednesday	Second Division	1951–52	3 (6)	
Syd Owen	DF	Luton Town	Second Division	1954	3	
Bedford Jezzard	FW	Fulham	Second Division	1954–55	2	
Johnny Haynes	FW	Fulham	Second Division	1954–59	32 (56)	
Geoff Bradford	FW	Bristol Rovers	Second Division	1955	1	
Ronnie Clayton	DF	Blackburn Rovers	Second Division	1955–58	21 (35)	
John Atyeo	FW	Bristol City	Second Division	1955–57	6	
Colin Grainger	FW	Sheffield United	Second Division	1956	2 (7)	
Alan Hodgkinson	GK	Sheffield United	Second Division	1957–60	5	
Bryan Douglas	MF	Blackburn Rovers	Second Division	1957–58	10 (36)	
Alan A'Court	FW	Liverpool	Second Division	1957–58	5	
Jim Langley	DF	Fulham	Second Division	1958	3	
Graham Shaw	DF	Sheffield United	Second Division	1958–59	4 (5)	
Tony Allen	DF	Stoke City	Second Division	1959	3	
Brian Clough	FW	Middlesbrough	Second Division	1959	2	
Edwin Holliday	FW	Middlesbrough	Second Division	1959	3	
Ray Wilson	DF	Huddersfield Town	Second Division	1960–64	30 (63)	
Mick McNeil	DF	Middlesbrough	Second Division	1960–61	9	
Stan Anderson	DF	Sunderland	Second Division	1962	2	
Alan Peacock	FW	Middlesbrough	Second Division	1962	4 (6)	
Mike O'Grady	FW	Huddersfield Town	Second Division	1962	2 (3)	
Terry Paine	FW	Southampton	Second Division	1963–66	19	
Keith Newton	DF	Blackburn Rovers	Second Division	1967–69	17 (27)	
Peter Shilton	GK	Leicester City	Second Division	1970–71	2 (125)	
Rodney Marsh	FW	Queens Park Rangers	Second Division	1971	1 (9)	
David Watson	DF	Sunderland	Second Division	1974–75	14 (65)	
Mick Channon	FW	Southampton	Second Division	1974–77	25 (45)	
Brian Little	FW	Aston Villa	Second Division	1975	1	
Tony Towers	MF	Sunderland	Second Division	1976	3	
Trevor Brooking	MF	West Ham United	Second Division	1979–81	12 (47)	
Kenny Sansom	DF	Crystal Palace	Second Division	1979	1 (86)	
Alan Devonshire	MF	West Ham United	Second Division	1980	2 (8)	
Alvin Martin	DF	West Ham United	Second Division	1981	2 (17)	
John Gregory	MF	Queens Park Rangers	Second Division	1983	3 (6)	
Mark Hateley	FW	Portsmouth	Second Division	1984	4 (32)	
Chris Woods	GK	Norwich City	Second Division	1986	3 (43)	
Steve Bull	FW	Wolverhampton Wanderers	Second Division	1989–90	11 (13)	
Earl Barrett	DF	Oldham Athletic	Second Division	1991	1 (3)	
Stuart Pearce	DF	Nottingham Forest	First Division	1993–94	3 (78)	
Paul Merson	FW	Middlesbrough	First Division	1998	4 (21)	
Michael Gray	DF	Sunderland	First Division	1999	3	
Kevin Phillips	FW	Sunderland	First Division	1999	1 (8)	
David James	GK	West Ham United	First Division	2003	5 (53)	
David Nugent	FW	Preston North End	Championship	2007	1	
Jay Bothroyd	FW	Cardiff City	Championship	2010	1	
Wilfried Zaha (Note: Zaha was capped twice by England, both of which came in friendlies. He decided to represent the country of his birth, the Ivory Coast (French: Côte d'Ivoire) in 2016, and was cap-tied officially in his third appearance for the country, when the Ivory Coast played Togo in the 2017 Africa Cup of Nations.)	FW	Crystal Palace	Championship	2012	1 (2)	
Jack Butland	GK	Stoke City	Championship	2018	1 (9)	
Sam Johnstone	GK	West Bromwich Albion	Championship	2021	2 (4)	
