= List of England international footballers =

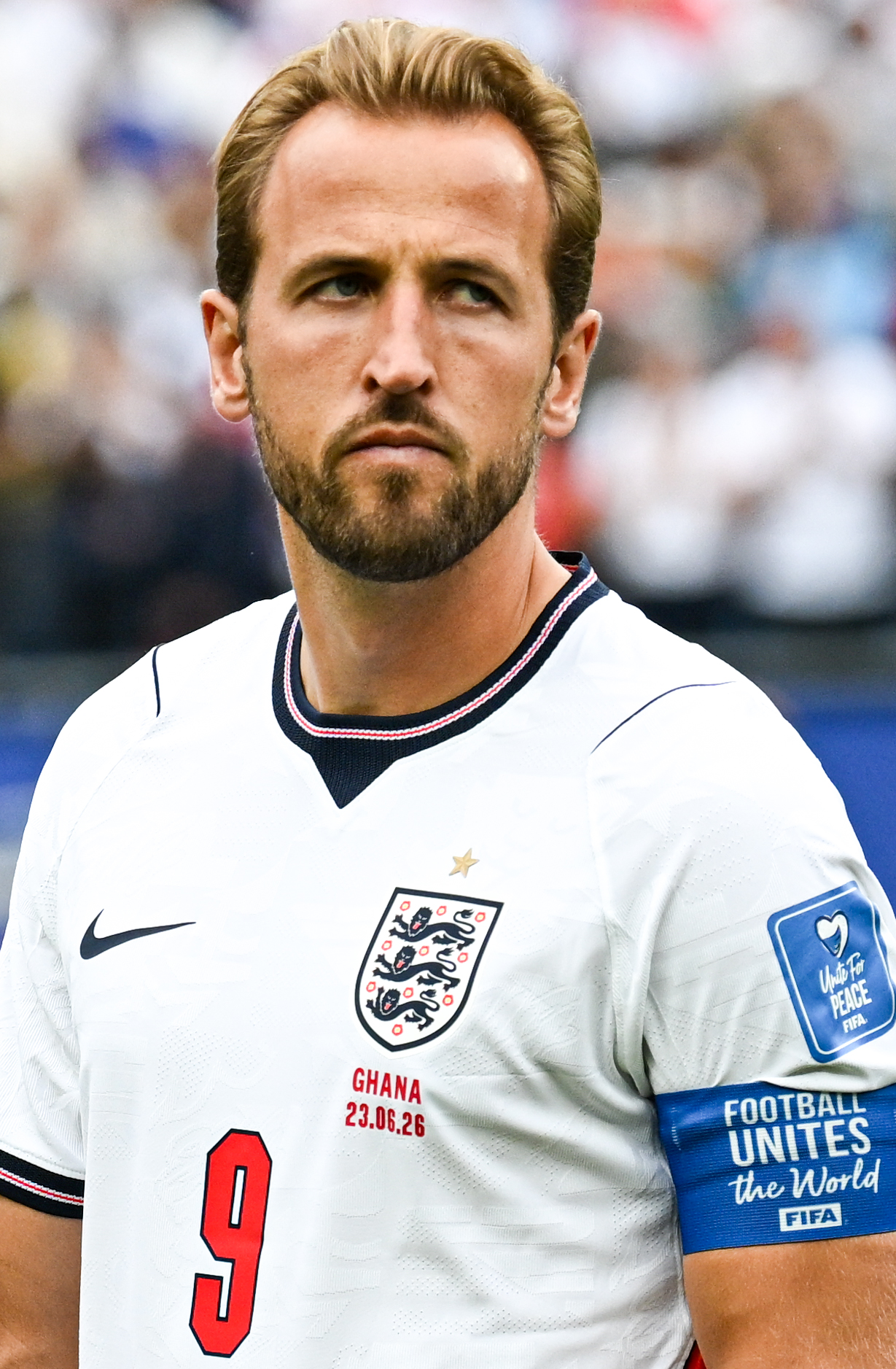
Harry Kane is England's most capped men's player with 127 appearances and all-time top scorer with 93 goals since 2015.

The England national men's football team represents the country of England in international association football. It is fielded by The Football Association, the governing body of football in England, and competes as a member of the Union of European Football Associations (UEFA), which encompasses the countries of Europe. England competed in the first official international football match on 30 November 1872, a 0–0 draw with Scotland at Hamilton Crescent.

England have competed in numerous competitions, and all players who have played in ten or more matches, either as a member of the starting eleven or as a substitute, are listed below. Each player's details include his playing position while with the team, the number of caps earned and goals scored in all international matches, and details of the first and most recent matches played in. The names are initially ordered by number of caps (in descending order), then by date of debut, then by alphabetical order. All statistics are correct up to and including the match played on 15 November 2026.

== Introduction ==
The first player to be capped ten times by England was Norman Bailey, who played his 10th match in an 8–1 away win against Ireland on 23 February 1884 in the 1883–84 British Home Championship. His final match, in which he earned his 19th cap, was the 3–1 home defeat to Scotland on 19 March 1887. The appearance record is held by Harry Kane, who passed Peter Shilton's record of 125 caps on 12 November 2026 in a 2–1 UEFA Nations League home win against Croatia.

Kane also holds the goalscoring record for England, with 93 goals since 2015. He passed Wayne Rooney's record of 53 goals, which had stood for eight years, with his 54th goal on 23 March 2023, in a 2–1 away win over Italy in a European Championship qualifier. Kane is England's highest scorer in World Cup finals matches, with fourteen goals, as well as the joint highest highest scorer in European Championship finals matches, tied with Alan Shearer, with seven goals.

== Key ==
Player
This colour background and the * symbol indicate that the player was active at club level as at the date specified above.
Players marked † were in the squad that won the 1966 FIFA World Cup.

Positions key
Pre-1960s		1960s–	
GK	Goalkeeper		
FB	Full back	DF	Defender
HB	Half back	MF	Midfielder
FW	Forward		

Position
Playing positions are listed according to the tactical formations that were employed at the time. Thus the change in the names of defensive and midfield positions reflects the tactical evolution that occurred from the 1960s onwards.
Caps and goals
Caps and goals comprise those in the FIFA World Cup and UEFA European Championship, their associated qualification matches, as well as UEFA Nations League matches and international friendly tournaments and matches.

== Players ==
England national team footballers with at least 10 caps
Player	Pos.	Caps	Goals	Debut		Last or most recent match		Ref.
Player	Pos.	Caps	Goals	Date	Opponent	Date	Opponent	Ref.
Harry Kane	FW	127	93	27 March 2015	Lithuania	15 November 2026	Spain	
Peter Shilton	GK	125	0	25 November 1970	East Germany	7 July 1990	Italy	
Wayne Rooney	FW	120	53	12 February 2003	Australia	15 November 2018	United States	
David Beckham	MF	115	17	1 September 1996	Moldova	14 October 2009	Belarus	
Steven Gerrard	MF	114	21	31 May 2000	Ukraine	24 June 2014	Costa Rica	
Bobby Moore †	DF	108	2	20 May 1962	Peru	14 November 1973	Italy	
Ashley Cole	DF	107	0	28 March 2001	Albania	5 March 2014	Denmark	
Bobby Charlton †	FW / MF	106	49	19 April 1958	Scotland	14 June 1970	West Germany	
Frank Lampard	MF	106	29	10 October 1999	Belgium	24 June 2014	Costa Rica	
Billy Wright	HB	105	3	28 September 1946	Ireland	28 May 1959	United States	
Kyle Walker	DF	96	1	12 November 2011	Spain	10 June 2025	Senegal	
John Stones	DF	94	3	30 May 2014	Peru	15 July 2026	Argentina	
Jordan Pickford	GK	94	0	10 November 2017	Germany	12 November 2026	Croatia	
Jordan Henderson	MF	91	3	17 November 2010	France	27 June 2026	Panama	
Bryan Robson	MF	90	26	6 February 1980	Republic of Ireland	16 October 1991	Turkey	
Michael Owen	FW	89	40	11 February 1998	Chile	26 March 2008	France	
Kenny Sansom	DF	86	1	23 May 1979	Wales	18 June 1988	Soviet Union	
Gary Neville	DF	85	0	3 June 1995	Japan	7 February 2007	Spain	
Ray Wilkins	MF	84	3	28 May 1976	Italy	12 November 1986	Yugoslavia	
Raheem Sterling	MF / FW	82	20	14 November 2012	Sweden	10 December 2022	France	
Declan Rice	MF	82	8	22 March 2019	Czech Republic	15 November 2026	Spain	
Rio Ferdinand	DF	81	3	15 November 1997	Cameroon	4 June 2011	Switzerland	
Gary Lineker	FW	80	48	26 May 1984	Scotland	17 June 1992	Sweden	
John Barnes	MF	79	11	28 May 1983	Northern Ireland	6 September 1995	Colombia	
Stuart Pearce	DF	78	5	19 May 1987	Brazil	8 September 1999	Poland	
John Terry	DF	78	6	3 June 2003	Serbia and Montenegro	7 September 2012	Moldova	
Marcus Rashford	FW	78	19	27 May 2016	Australia	18 July 2026	France	
Terry Butcher	DF	77	3	31 May 1980	Australia	4 July 1990	West Germany	
Tom Finney	FW	76	30	28 September 1946	Ireland	22 October 1958	Soviet Union	
David Seaman	GK	75	0	16 November 1988	Saudi Arabia	16 October 2002	Macedonia	
Joe Hart	GK	75	0	1 June 2008	Trinidad and Tobago	14 November 2017	Brazil	
Gordon Banks †	GK	73	0	6 April 1963	Scotland	27 May 1972	Scotland	
Sol Campbell	DF	73	1	18 May 1996	Hungary	21 November 2007	Croatia	
Alan Ball Jr. †	MF	72	8	9 May 1965	Yugoslavia	24 May 1975	Scotland	
Martin Peters †	MF	67	20	4 May 1966	Yugoslavia	18 May 1974	Scotland	
Tony Adams	DF	66	5	18 February 1987	Spain	7 October 2000	Germany	
Paul Scholes	MF	66	14	24 May 1997	South Africa	24 June 2004	Portugal	
Harry Maguire	DF	66	7	8 October 2017	Lithuania	31 March 2026	Japan	
David Watson	DF	65	4	3 April 1974	Portugal	2 June 1982	Iceland	
Ray Wilson †	DF	63	0	9 April 1960	Scotland	8 June 1968	Soviet Union	
Kevin Keegan	FW	63	21	15 November 1972	Wales	5 July 1982	Spain	
Alan Shearer	FW	63	30	19 February 1992	France	20 June 2000	Romania	
Emlyn Hughes	DF / MF	62	1	5 November 1969	Netherlands	24 May 1980	Scotland	
Chris Waddle	MF	62	6	26 March 1985	Republic of Ireland	16 October 1991	Turkey	
David Platt	MF	62	27	15 November 1989	Italy	26 June 1996	Germany	
Emile Heskey	FW	62	7	28 April 1999	Hungary	27 June 2010	Germany	
Jude Bellingham	MF	62	14	12 November 2020	Republic of Ireland	15 November 2026	Spain	
Ray Clemence	GK	61	0	15 November 1972	Wales	16 November 1983	Luxembourg	
James Milner	MF / DF	61	1	12 August 2009	Netherlands	11 June 2016	Russia	
Gary Cahill	DF	61	5	3 September 2010	Bulgaria	28 June 2018	Belgium	
Peter Beardsley	FW	59	9	29 January 1986	Egypt	23 May 1996	China	
Des Walker	DF	59	0	14 September 1988	Denmark	17 November 1993	San Marino	
Phil Neville	DF	59	0	23 May 1996	China	13 October 2007	Estonia	
Bukayo Saka	FW	59	19	8 October 2020	Wales	3 October 2026	Croatia	
Jimmy Greaves †	FW	57	44	17 May 1959	Peru	27 May 1967	Austria	
Paul Gascoigne	MF	57	10	14 September 1988	Denmark	29 May 1998	Belgium	
Gareth Southgate	DF	57	2	12 December 1995	Portugal	31 March 2004	Sweden	
Jermain Defoe	FW	57	20	31 March 2004	Sweden	10 June 2017	Scotland	
Johnny Haynes	FW	56	18	2 October 1954	Northern Ireland	10 June 1962	Brazil	
Joe Cole	MF	56	10	25 May 2001	Mexico	27 June 2010	Germany	
Stanley Matthews	FW	54	11	29 September 1934	Wales	15 May 1957	Denmark	
Glen Johnson	DF	54	1	16 November 2003	Denmark	19 June 2014	Uruguay	
Kieran Trippier	DF	54	1	13 June 2017	France	10 July 2024	Netherlands	
Glenn Hoddle	MF	53	8	22 November 1979	Bulgaria	18 June 1988	Soviet Union	
Paul Ince	MF	53	2	9 September 1992	Spain	20 June 2000	Romania	
David James	GK	53	0	29 March 1997	Mexico	27 June 2010	Germany	
Gareth Barry	DF / MF	53	3	31 May 2000	Ukraine	26 May 2012	Norway	
Trevor Francis	FW	52	12	9 February 1977	Netherlands	23 April 1986	Scotland	
Teddy Sheringham	FW	51	11	29 May 1993	Poland	21 June 2002	Brazil	
Phil Neal	DF	50	5	24 March 1976	Wales	21 September 1983	Denmark	
Ron Flowers †	HB	49	10	15 May 1955	France	29 June 1966	Norway	
Geoff Hurst †	FW	49	24	23 February 1966	West Germany	29 April 1972	West Germany	
Eric Dier	MF / DF	49	3	13 November 2015	Spain	4 December 2022	Senegal	
Phil Foden	MF	49	4	5 September 2020	Iceland	31 March 2026	Japan	
Jimmy Dickinson	HB	48	0	18 May 1949	Norway	5 December 1956	Denmark	
Colin Bell	MF	48	9	22 May 1968	Sweden	30 October 1975	Czechoslovakia	
Trevor Brooking	MF	47	5	3 April 1974	Portugal	5 July 1982	Spain	
Theo Walcott	FW / MF	47	8	30 May 2006	Hungary	15 November 2016	Spain	
Mick Channon	FW	46	21	11 October 1972	Yugoslavia	7 September 1977	Switzerland	
Gary Stevens	DF	46	0	6 June 1985	Italy	3 June 1992	Finland	
Mark Wright	DF	45	1	2 May 1984	Wales	18 May 1996	Hungary	
Jimmy Armfield †	DF	43	0	13 May 1959	Brazil	26 June 1966	Finland	
Chris Woods	GK	43	0	16 June 1985	United States	9 June 1993	United States	
Martin Keown	DF	43	2	19 February 1992	France	26 May 2002	Cameroon	
Mick Mills	DF / MF	42	0	11 October 1972	Yugoslavia	5 July 1982	Spain	
Phil Thompson	DF	42	1	24 March 1976	Wales	17 November 1982	Greece	
Steve Coppell	MF	42	7	16 November 1977	Italy	30 March 1983	Greece	
Tony Woodcock	FW	42	16	16 May 1978	Northern Ireland	26 February 1986	Israel	
David Batty	MF	42	0	21 May 1991	Soviet Union	8 September 1999	Poland	
Owen Hargreaves	MF / DF	42	0	15 August 2001	Netherlands	28 May 2008	United States	
Peter Crouch	FW	42	22	31 May 2005	Colombia	17 November 2010	France	
Danny Welbeck	FW	42	16	29 March 2011	Ghana	11 September 2018	Switzerland	
Bob Crompton	FB	41	0	3 March 1902	Wales	4 April 1914	Scotland	
Paul Robinson	GK	41	0	12 February 2003	Australia	17 October 2007	Russia	
Marc Guéhi	DF	41	1	26 March 2022	Switzerland	6 October 2026	Czech Republic	
Phil Jagielka	DF	40	3	1 June 2008	Trinidad and Tobago	15 November 2016	Spain	
Nicky Butt	MF	39	0	29 March 1997	Mexico	17 November 2004	Spain	
Ashley Young	MF / DF	39	7	16 November 2007	Austria	11 July 2018	Croatia	
Jack Grealish	FW	39	4	8 September 2020	Denmark	13 October 2024	Finland	
Jamie Carragher	DF	38	0	28 April 1999	Hungary	18 June 2010	Algeria	
George Cohen †	DF	37	0	6 May 1964	Uruguay	22 November 1967	Northern Ireland	
Steve McManaman	MF / FW	37	3	16 November 1994	Nigeria	6 October 2001	Greece	
Dele Alli	MF	37	3	9 October 2015	Estonia	9 June 2019	Switzerland	
Trent Alexander-Arnold	DF / MF	37	4	7 June 2018	Costa Rica	12 November 2026	Croatia	
Bryan Douglas	FW	36	11	19 October 1957	Wales	5 June 1963	Switzerland	
Trevor Steven	MF	36	4	27 February 1985	Northern Ireland	14 June 1992	France	
Graeme Le Saux	DF	36	1	9 March 1994	Denmark	7 October 2000	Germany	
Wayne Bridge	DF	36	1	13 February 2002	Netherlands	14 November 2009	Brazil	
Shaun Wright-Phillips	MF / FW	36	6	18 August 2004	Ukraine	12 October 2010	Montenegro	
Mason Mount	MF	36	5	7 September 2019	Bulgaria	10 December 2022	France	
Ronnie Clayton	HB	35	0	2 November 1955	Northern Ireland	11 May 1960	Yugoslavia	
Alan Mullery	MF	35	1	9 December 1964	Netherlands	13 October 1971	Switzerland	
Jack Charlton †	DF	35	6	10 April 1965	Scotland	11 June 1970	Czechoslovakia	
Paul Mariner	FW	35	13	30 March 1977	Luxembourg	1 May 1985	Romania	
Stewart Downing	MF	35	0	9 February 2005	Netherlands	18 November 2014	Scotland	
Alex Oxlade-Chamberlain	MF	35	7	26 May 2012	Norway	17 November 2019	Kosovo	
Roger Hunt †	FW	34	18	4 April 1962	Austria	15 January 1969	Romania	
Michael Carrick	MF	34	0	25 May 2001	Mexico	13 November 2015	Spain	
Jack Wilshere	MF	34	2	11 August 2010	Hungary	27 June 2016	Iceland	
Adam Lallana	MF	34	3	15 November 2013	Chile	27 March 2018	Italy	
Luke Shaw	DF	34	3	5 March 2014	Denmark	14 July 2024	Spain	
Nat Lofthouse	FW	33	30	22 November 1950	Yugoslavia	26 November 1958	Wales	
Roger Byrne	FB	33	0	3 April 1954	Scotland	27 November 1957	France	
Ron Springett †	GK	33	0	18 November 1959	Northern Ireland	29 June 1966	Norway	
Ian Wright	FW	33	9	6 February 1991	Cameroon	18 November 1998	Czech Republic	
Kieron Dyer	MF / DF	33	0	4 September 1999	Luxembourg	22 August 2007	Germany	
Ross Barkley	MF	33	6	6 September 2013	Moldova	14 October 2019	Bulgaria	
Alf Ramsey †	FB	32	3	2 December 1948	Switzerland	25 November 1953	Hungary	
Mark Hateley	FW	32	9	2 June 1984	Soviet Union	25 March 1992	Czechoslovakia	
Jesse Lingard	MF	32	6	8 October 2016	Malta	9 October 2021	Andorra	
Chris Smalling	DF	31	1	2 September 2011	Bulgaria	10 June 2017	Scotland	
Kalvin Phillips	MF	31	1	8 September 2020	Denmark	20 November 2023	North Macedonia	
Ezri Konsa	DF	31	3	23 March 2024	Brazil	15 November 2026	Spain	
Eddie Hapgood	FB	30	0	13 May 1933	Italy	18 May 1939	Yugoslavia	
Viv Anderson	DF	30	2	29 November 1978	Czechoslovakia	24 May 1988	Colombia	
Darren Anderton	MF / DF	30	7	9 March 1994	Denmark	10 November 2001	Sweden	
Leighton Baines	DF	30	1	3 March 2010	Egypt	27 March 2015	Lithuania	
Anthony Gordon	FW	30	7	23 March 2024	Brazil	15 November 2026	Spain	
Danny Rose	DF	29	0	26 March 2016	Germany	11 October 2019	Czech Republic	
Reece James	DF	29	1	8 October 2020	Wales	18 July 2026	France	
Nobby Stiles †	MF	28	1	10 April 1965	Scotland	25 April 1970	Scotland	
Norman Hunter †	DF	28	2	8 December 1965	Spain	30 October 1974	Czechoslovakia	
Roy McFarland	DF	28	0	3 February 1971	Malta	17 November 1976	Italy	
Morgan Rogers	FW	28	3	14 November 2024	Greece	15 November 2026	Spain	
Neil Franklin	HB	27	0	28 September 1946	Ireland	15 April 1950	Scotland	
Keith Newton	DF	27	0	23 February 1966	West Germany	14 June 1970	West Germany	
Francis Lee	FW	27	10	11 December 1968	Bulgaria	29 April 1972	West Germany	
Colin Todd	DF	27	0	23 May 1972	Northern Ireland	28 May 1977	Northern Ireland	
Trevor Cherry	DF / MF	27	0	24 March 1976	Wales	18 June 1980	Spain	
Phil Jones	DF	27	0	7 October 2011	Montenegro	14 July 2018	Belgium	
Billy Wedlock	HB	26	2	16 February 1907	Ireland	16 March 1914	Wales	
Ernie Blenkinsop	FB	26	0	17 May 1928	France	1 April 1933	Scotland	
Sammy Crooks	FW	26	7	5 April 1930	Scotland	2 December 1936	Hungary	
Wilf Mannion	FW	26	11	28 September 1946	Ireland	3 October 1951	France	
Brian Labone	DF	26	0	20 October 1962	Northern Ireland	14 June 1970	West Germany	
Neil Webb	MF	26	4	9 September 1987	West Germany	17 June 1992	Sweden	
Robbie Fowler	FW	26	7	27 March 1996	Bulgaria	15 June 2002	Denmark	
Joleon Lescott	DF	26	1	13 October 2007	Estonia	26 March 2013	Montenegro	
Daniel Sturridge	FW	26	8	15 November 2011	Sweden	8 October 2017	Lithuania	
Jamie Vardy	FW	26	7	7 June 2015	Republic of Ireland	11 July 2018	Croatia	
Jesse Pennington	FB	25	0	18 March 1907	Wales	10 April 1920	Scotland	
Roy Goodall	FB	25	0	17 April 1926	Scotland	6 December 1933	France	
Harry Hibbs	GK	25	0	20 November 1929	Wales	5 February 1936	Wales	
Stan Mortensen	FW	25	23	25 May 1947	Portugal	25 November 1953	Hungary	
Terry McDermott	MF	25	3	7 September 1977	Switzerland	2 June 1982	Iceland	
Eberechi Eze	MF	25	3	16 June 2023	Malta	6 October 2026	Czech Republic	
Bert Williams	GK	24	0	22 May 1949	France	22 October 1955	Wales	
Martin Chivers	FW	24	13	3 February 1971	Malta	17 October 1973	Poland	
Paul Madeley	DF / MF	24	0	15 May 1971	Northern Ireland	9 February 1977	Netherlands	
Steve Hodge	MF	24	0	26 March 1986	Soviet Union	1 May 1991	Turkey	
Ollie Watkins	FW	24	7	25 March 2021	San Marino	18 July 2026	France	
Steve Bloomer	FW	23	28	9 March 1895	Ireland	6 April 1907	Scotland	
Vivian Woodward	FW	23	29	14 February 1903	Ireland	13 March 1911	Wales	
Tommy Lawton	FW	23	22	22 October 1938	Wales	26 September 1948	Denmark	
Gil Merrick	GK	23	0	14 November 1951	Ireland	26 June 1954	Uruguay	
Don Howe	FB	23	0	19 October 1957	Wales	18 November 1959	Northern Ireland	
Maurice Norman	DF	23	0	20 May 1962	Peru	9 December 1964	Netherlands	
Nigel Martyn	GK	23	0	29 April 1992	CIS	26 May 2002	Cameroon	
Nick Barmby	MF	23	4	29 March 1995	Uruguay	6 October 2001	Greece	
Wes Brown	DF	23	1	28 April 1999	Hungary	3 March 2010	Egypt	
Jadon Sancho	FW	23	3	12 October 2018	Croatia	9 October 2021	Andorra	
Elliot Anderson	MF	23	0	6 September 2025	Andorra	15 November 2026	Spain	
Ben Warren	HB	22	2	17 February 1906	Ireland	1 April 1911	Scotland	
Peter Barnes	MF	22	4	16 November 1977	Italy	25 May 1982	Netherlands	
Gary Pallister	DF	22	0	27 April 1988	Hungary	9 October 1996	Poland	
Lee Dixon	DF	22	1	25 April 1990	Czechoslovakia	10 February 1999	France	
Darius Vassell	FW	22	6	13 February 2002	Netherlands	24 June 2004	Portugal	
Conor Gallagher	MF	22	1	15 November 2021	San Marino	10 June 2025	Senegal	
Jarrod Bowen	FW	22	1	4 June 2022	Hungary	31 March 2026	Japan	
Sam Hardy	GK	21	0	16 February 1907	Ireland	10 April 1920	Scotland	
Cliff Bastin	FW	21	12	18 November 1931	Wales	26 May 1938	France	
Dennis Wise	MF	21	1	1 May 1991	Turkey	11 October 2000	Finland	
Paul Merson	MF	21	3	11 September 1991	Germany	18 November 1998	Czech Republic	
Rob Lee	MF / DF	21	2	12 October 1994	Romania	14 October 1998	Luxembourg	
Ledley King	DF	21	2	27 March 2002	Italy	12 June 2010	United States	
Jermaine Jenas	MF	21	1	12 February 2003	Australia	14 November 2009	Brazil	
Matthew Upson	DF	21	2	22 May 2003	South Africa	27 June 2010	Germany	
Aaron Lennon	MF / FW	21	0	3 June 2006	Jamaica	6 February 2013	Brazil	
Ben Chilwell	DF	21	1	11 September 2018	Switzerland	26 March 2024	Belgium	
G. O. Smith	FW	20	11	25 February 1893	Ireland	30 March 1901	Scotland	
Alfred Strange	HB	20	0	5 April 1930	Scotland	6 December 1933	France	
Wilf Copping	HB	20	0	13 May 1933	Italy	24 May 1939	Romania	
Bobby Robson	FW / HB	20	4	27 November 1957	France	9 May 1962	Switzerland	
John Connelly †	FW	20	7	17 October 1959	Wales	11 July 1966	Uruguay	
Terry Cooper	DF	20	0	12 March 1969	France	20 November 1974	Portugal	
Terry Fenwick	DF	20	0	2 May 1984	Wales	17 February 1988	Israel	
Fabian Delph	MF	20	0	3 September 2014	Norway	9 June 2019	Switzerland	
Norman Bailey	HB	19	2	2 March 1878	Scotland	19 March 1887	Scotland	
George Male	FB	19	0	14 November 1934	Italy	24 May 1939	Romania	
Vic Woodley	GK	19	0	17 April 1937	Scotland	24 May 1939	Romania	
Frank Swift	GK	19	0	28 September 1946	Ireland	18 May 1949	Norway	
Tommy Taylor	FW	19	16	17 May 1953	Argentina	27 November 1957	France	
Peter Swan	DF	19	0	11 May 1960	Yugoslavia	9 May 1962	Switzerland	
George Eastham †	FW	19	2	8 May 1963	Brazil	3 July 1966	Denmark	
Terry Paine †	FW	19	7	29 May 1963	Czechoslovakia	16 July 1966	Mexico	
Allan Clarke	FW	19	10	11 June 1970	Czechoslovakia	19 November 1975	Portugal	
Peter Storey	DF / MF	19	0	21 April 1971	Greece	14 June 1973	Italy	
Paul Parker	DF	19	0	26 April 1989	Albania	9 March 1994	Denmark	
Danny Mills	MF / DF	19	0	25 May 2001	Mexico	18 February 2004	Portugal	
Alan Smith	FW / MF	19	1	25 May 2001	Mexico	16 November 2007	Austria	
Ryan Bertrand	DF	19	1	15 August 2012	Italy	14 November 2017	Brazil	
Charles Bambridge	FW / HB	18	11	5 April 1879	Scotland	19 March 1887	Scotland	
Billy Walker	FW	18	9	23 October 1920	Ireland	7 December 1932	Austria	
Eric Brook	FW	18	10	19 October 1929	Ireland	17 November 1937	Wales	
Duncan Edwards	HB / FW	18	5	2 April 1955	Scotland	27 November 1957	France	
Brian Greenhoff	DF	18	0	8 May 1976	Wales	31 May 1980	Australia	
Carlton Palmer	MF / DF	18	1	29 April 1992	CIS	13 October 1993	Netherlands	
Scott Parker	MF	18	0	16 November 2003	Denmark	22 March 2013	San Marino	
Tyrone Mings	DF	18	2	14 October 2019	Bulgaria	16 June 2023	Malta	
Laurie Scott	FB	17	0	28 September 1946	Ireland	10 November 1948	Wales	
John Aston Sr.	FB	17	0	26 September 1948	Denmark	7 October 1950	Ireland	
Bill Eckersley	FB	17	0	2 July 1950	Spain	25 November 1953	Hungary	
Jeff Hall	FB	17	0	2 October 1955	Denmark	19 May 1957	Republic of Ireland	
Tony Currie	MF	17	3	23 May 1972	Northern Ireland	10 June 1979	Sweden	
Ray Kennedy	MF	17	3	24 March 1976	Wales	15 June 1980	Italy	
Graham Rix	MF	17	0	10 September 1980	Norway	4 April 1984	Northern Ireland	
Alvin Martin	DF	17	0	12 May 1981	Brazil	10 September 1986	Sweden	
Steve McMahon	MF	17	0	17 February 1988	Israel	14 November 1990	Republic of Ireland	
Les Ferdinand	FW	17	5	17 February 1993	San Marino	29 May 1998	Belgium	
Jamie Redknapp	MF	17	1	6 September 1995	Colombia	17 November 1999	Scotland	
Billy Bassett	FW	16	8	7 April 1888	Ireland	4 April 1896	Scotland	
Ernest Needham	HB	16	3	7 April 1894	Scotland	3 March 1902	Wales	
William Oakley	FB	16	0	18 March 1895	Wales	30 March 1901	Scotland	
Willis Edwards	HB	16	0	1 March 1926	Wales	20 November 1929	Wales	
Dixie Dean	FW	16	18	12 February 1927	Wales	17 October 1932	Ireland	
Peter Thompson	FW / MF	16	0	17 May 1964	Portugal	25 April 1970	Scotland	
Gary Mabbutt	DF / MF	16	1	13 October 1982	West Germany	25 March 1992	Czechoslovakia	
Noni Madueke	FW	16	1	10 September 2024	Finland	11 July 2026	Norway	
Tom Cooper	FB	15	0	22 October 1927	Ireland	29 September 1934	Wales	
Bobby Smith	FW	15	13	8 October 1960	Northern Ireland	20 November 1963	Northern Ireland	
Stuart Pearson	FW	15	5	8 May 1976	Wales	16 May 1978	Northern Ireland	
Tony Dorigo	DF	15	0	13 December 1989	Yugoslavia	13 October 1993	Netherlands	
Andy Cole	FW	15	1	29 March 1995	Uruguay	6 October 2001	Greece	
Joe Gomez	DF	15	0	10 November 2017	Germany	7 June 2024	Iceland	
Dominic Calvert-Lewin	FW	15	4	8 October 2020	Wales	15 November 2026	Spain	
Djed Spence	DF	15	0	9 September 2025	Serbia	15 November 2026	Spain	
John Goodall	FW	14	12	4 February 1888	Wales	28 March 1898	Wales	
Jimmy Crabtree	HB / FB	14	0	3 March 1894	Ireland	3 March 1902	Wales	
Bob Kelly	FW	14	8	10 April 1920	Scotland	31 March 1928	Scotland	
Len Goulden	FW	14	4	14 May 1937	Norway	24 May 1939	Romania	
Ivor Broadis	FW	14	8	28 November 1951	Austria	26 June 1954	Uruguay	
Derek Kevan	FW	14	8	6 April 1957	Scotland	10 May 1961	Mexico	
Eddie Hopkinson	GK	14	0	19 October 1957	Wales	28 October 1959	Sweden	
Gordon Milne	HB	14	0	8 May 1963	Brazil	21 October 1964	Belgium	
Malcolm Macdonald	FW	14	6	20 May 1972	Wales	17 June 1975	Portugal	
Luther Blissett	FW	14	3	13 October 1982	West Germany	2 June 1984	Soviet Union	
Sammy Lee	MF	14	2	17 November 1982	Greece	17 June 1984	Chile	
David Rocastle	MF	14	0	14 September 1988	Denmark	17 May 1992	Brazil	
Nigel Clough	MF	14	0	23 May 1989	Chile	19 June 1993	Germany	
Nathaniel Clyne	DF	14	0	15 November 2014	Slovenia	15 November 2016	Spain	
Cole Palmer	MF	14	2	17 November 2023	Malta	31 March 2026	Japan	
Kobbie Mainoo	MF	14	0	23 March 2024	Brazil	10 June 2026	Costa Rica	
Tinsley Lindley	FW	13	14	13 March 1886	Ireland	7 March 1891	Ireland	
Percy Melmoth Walters	FB	13	0	28 February 1885	Ireland	5 April 1890	Scotland	
Raich Carter	FW	13	7	14 April 1934	Scotland	18 May 1947	Switzerland	
Henry Cockburn	HB	13	0	28 September 1946	Ireland	3 October 1951	France	
George Hardwick	FB	13	0	28 September 1946	Ireland	10 April 1948	Scotland	
Jackie Milburn	FW	13	10	9 October 1948	Ireland	2 October 1955	Denmark	
Jack Froggatt	HB	13	2	16 November 1949	Ireland	8 June 1953	United States	
Peter Reid	MF	13	0	9 June 1985	Mexico	28 May 1988	Switzerland	
Alan Smith	FW	13	2	16 November 1988	Saudi Arabia	17 June 1992	Sweden	
Steve Bull	FW	13	4	27 May 1989	Scotland	17 October 1990	Poland	
Darren Bent	FW	13	4	1 March 2006	Uruguay	15 November 2011	Sweden	
Micah Richards	DF	13	1	15 November 2006	Netherlands	29 February 2012	Netherlands	
Tom Cleverley	MF	13	0	15 August 2012	Italy	19 November 2013	Germany	
Andros Townsend	MF	13	3	11 October 2013	Montenegro	15 November 2016	Spain	
Dan Burn	DF	13	0	21 March 2025	Albania	15 November 2026	Spain	
Nico O'Reilly	DF	13	0	13 November 2025	Serbia	26 September 2026	Spain	
Charlie Athersmith	FW	12	3	5 March 1892	Ireland	7 April 1900	Scotland	
George Wilson	HB	12	0	14 March 1921	Wales	17 May 1924	France	
Joe Bradford	FW	12	7	20 October 1923	Ireland	22 November 1930	Wales	
Ken Willingham	HB	12	1	20 May 1937	Finland	18 May 1939	Yugoslavia	
Stan Cullis	HB	12	0	23 October 1937	Ireland	24 May 1939	Romania	
Jimmy Mullen	FW	12	6	12 April 1947	Scotland	20 June 1954	Switzerland	
Roy Bentley	FW	12	9	13 May 1949	Sweden	22 May 1955	Portugal	
Dennis Wilshaw	FW	12	10	10 October 1953	Wales	6 October 1956	Northern Ireland	
Bill Slater	HB	12	0	10 November 1954	Wales	19 April 1960	Scotland	
Gerry Francis	MF	12	3	30 October 1974	Czechoslovakia	13 June 1976	Finland	
Bob Latchford	FW	12	5	16 November 1977	Italy	13 June 1979	Austria	
Dave Watson	DF	12	0	10 June 1984	Brazil	18 June 1988	Soviet Union	
Andy Sinton	MF / DF	12	0	13 November 1991	Poland	17 November 1993	San Marino	
Trevor Sinclair	MF	12	0	10 November 2001	Sweden	20 August 2003	Croatia	
Robert Green	GK	12	0	31 May 2005	Colombia	26 May 2012	Norway	
Adam Johnson	MF	12	2	24 May 2010	Mexico	15 August 2012	Italy	
Michael Keane	DF	12	1	22 March 2017	Germany	12 November 2020	Republic of Ireland	
Jimmy Forrest	HB	11	0	17 March 1884	Wales	15 March 1890	Ireland	
Jack Robinson	GK	11	0	20 February 1897	Ireland	9 March 1901	Ireland	
Jock Rutherford	FW	11	3	9 April 1904	Scotland	13 June 1908	Bohemia	
Arthur Bridgett	FW	11	3	1 April 1905	Scotland	1 June 1909	Austria	
Harold Fleming	FW	11	9	3 April 1909	Scotland	14 April 1914	Scotland	
Jack Hill	HB	11	0	28 February 1925	Wales	15 May 1929	Spain	
Jack Barker	HB	11	0	29 September 1934	Wales	17 October 1936	Wales	
Bert Sproston	FB	11	0	17 October 1936	Wales	9 November 1938	Norway	
Bobby Langton	FW	11	1	28 September 1946	Ireland	7 October 1950	Ireland	
Johnny Byrne	FW	11	8	22 November 1961	Northern Ireland	10 April 1965	Scotland	
Tommy Wright	DF	11	0	8 June 1968	Soviet Union	7 June 1970	Brazil	
Russell Osman	DF	11	0	31 May 1980	Australia	21 September 1983	Denmark	
Peter Withe	FW	11	1	12 May 1981	Brazil	14 November 1984	Turkey	
Tim Flowers	GK	11	0	13 June 1993	Brazil	27 May 1998	Morocco	
Rickie Lambert	FW	11	3	14 August 2013	Scotland	18 November 2014	Scotland	
James Ward-Prowse	MF	11	2	22 March 2017	Germany	11 June 2022	Italy	
Tammy Abraham	FW	11	3	10 November 2017	Germany	11 June 2022	Italy	
Ruben Loftus-Cheek	MF	11	0	10 November 2017	Germany	9 October 2025	Wales	
Myles Lewis-Skelly	DF / MF	11	1	21 March 2025	Albania	15 November 2026	Spain	
Jarell Quansah	DF	11	0	16 November 2025	Albania	15 November 2026	Spain	
Johnny Holt	HB	10	0	15 March 1890	Wales	17 March 1900	Ireland	
Tommy Crawshaw	HB	10	1	9 March 1895	Ireland	12 March 1904	Ireland	
George Holley	FW	10	8	15 March 1909	Wales	5 April 1913	Scotland	
Willie Hall	FW	10	9	6 December 1933	France	18 May 1939	Yugoslavia	
Harry Johnston	HB	10	0	27 November 1946	Netherlands	25 November 1953	Hungary	
Gordon Cowans	MF	10	2	23 February 1983	Wales	14 November 1990	Republic of Ireland	
Mike Duxbury	DF	10	0	16 November 1983	Luxembourg	17 October 1984	Finland	
Ray Parlour	MF	10	0	27 March 1999	Poland	15 November 2000	Italy	
Kieran Gibbs	DF	10	0	11 August 2010	Hungary	17 November 2015	France	
Harry Winks	MF	10	1	8 October 2017	Lithuania	18 November 2020	Iceland	
Nick Pope	GK	10	0	7 June 2018	Costa Rica	26 September 2022	Germany	
Conor Coady	DF	10	1	8 September 2020	Denmark	4 June 2022	Hungary	
Ivan Toney	FW	10	1	26 March 2023	Ukraine	18 July 2026	France	
Morgan Gibbs-White	MF	10	0	7 September 2024	Republic of Ireland	6 October 2026	Czech Republic	

== See also ==
- List of England international footballers with one cap
- List of England international footballers (2–3 caps)
- List of England international footballers (4–9 caps)
- List of England national football team World Cup and European Championship squads
- List of England national football team captains
