= Thomas Danks =

English footballer

Tom Danks
Personal information
- Full name: Thomas Danks
- Date of birth: 30 May 1863
- Place of birth: Nottingham, England
- Date of death: 27 April 1908 (aged 44)
- Position: Inside right

Senior career*
Years	Team	Apps	(Gls)
- Nottingham Forest

International career
1885	England	1	(0)
- * Club domestic league appearances and goals

Tom Danks (30 May 1863 – 27 April 1908) was an English international footballer, who played as an inside right.

== Career ==
Born in Nottingham, Tom Danks played for Nottingham Forest, and earned one cap for England in 1885.
