= Harold Morse =

English footballer

Personal information
- Date of birth: 4 November 1859
- Place of birth: Ladywood, Birmingham, England
- Date of death: 4 November 1935 (aged 76)
- Place of death: Merchantville, New Jersey, U.S.
- Position: Left back

Senior career*
Years	Team	Apps	(Gls)
- Notts County

International career
1879	England	1	(0)
- * Club domestic league appearances and goals

Harold Morse (4 December 1859 – 4 November 1935) was an English international footballer, who played as a left back.

== Career ==
Born in Birmingham, Morse started out playing rugby for Derby Wanderers. He then moved to football and played for Notts County and Notts Rangers. In 1879, he made his solitary appearance for England against Scotland. England won the game 5–4.

He later migrated to the US and settled in New Jersey. He died on Monday, 4 November 1935, in Cooper Hospital, Merchantville, New Jersey following a short illness after a holiday in Florida.
