= Charles Dobson =

English footballer (1862–1939)

Personal information
- Full name: Charles Frederick Dobson
- Date of birth: 9 September 1862
- Place of birth: Basford, England
- Date of death: 18 May 1939 (aged 76)
- Place of death: Ealing, Middlesex, England
- Position: Half back

Senior career*
Years	Team	Apps	(Gls)
1888–1889	Notts County	1	(0)

International career
1886	England	1	(0)
- * Club domestic league appearances and goals

Charles Frederick Dobson (9 September 1862 – 18 May 1939) was an English international footballer, who played as a half back.

== Career ==
Born in Basford, Dobson played for Notts County, and earned one cap for England in 1886. At club level, Dobson made a single appearance for Notts County in The Football League.

Dobson also took part in tours by Corinthians between 1880 and 1884. By the time the Football League started in September 1888 Dobson was only a reserve team player.

== Personal life ==
His older brother, Alfred Dobson, also played football for England.
