= Alfred Dobson (footballer) =

English footballer (1859–1932)

Personal information
- Full name: Alfred Thomas Carrick Dobson
- Date of birth: 28 March 1859
- Place of birth: Basford, England
- Date of death: 22 October 1932 (aged 73)
- Position: Right back

Senior career*
Years	Team	Apps	(Gls)
- Notts County
- Corinthian

International career
1882–1884	England	4	(0)
- * Club domestic league appearances and goals

Alfred Thomas Carrick Dobson (28 March 1859 – 22 October 1932) was an English international footballer, who played as a right back.

== Early and personal life ==
Dobson was born on 28 March 1859 in Basford. He served in the Army, as a lieutenant. He later worked as a lace manufacturer. His first wife died, and he married two further times, having one son. His son died in World War One.

His brother Charles Dobson was also a footballer.

== Career ==
He played as an amateur for Notts County, and guested for Corinthian.

He earned four caps for England between 18 February 1882 and 17 March 1884. His first cap came in the very first international game for the Ireland national football team and resulted in a 13–0 win for England. Two years later he received his last three caps, which were in the inaugural British Home Championship of 1884, in which England finished runner up to Scotland.
