= William Brindle =

English footballer

Personal information
- Date of birth: 24 May 1853
- Place of birth: Darwen, England
- Date of death: 16 September 1900 (aged 47)
- Place of death: Holyoke, Massachusetts, US
- Position: Left-back

Senior career*
Years	Team	Apps	(Gls)
- Darwen
- Blackburn Olympic

International career
1880	England	2	(0)
- * Club domestic league appearances and goals

William Brindle (24 May 1853 – 16 September 1900) was an English footballer who played his club football at left-back for Darwen and Blackburn Olympic. He made two appearances for England in 1880, scoring once. He was previously erroneously referred to as Thomas Brindle in various sources.

== Career ==
Brindle was born in Darwen, Lancashire and played junior football in the local area before signing with his local club, who were then one of the major forces in the game. He helped them to win the Lancashire Cup in its inaugural season of 1879-80 defeating Blackburn Rovers 3–0 in the final.

In March 1880 he became the first Darwen F.C. player to represent England. Having successfully negotiated his way through a North v South trial match at the Oval on 6 March, he made his debut in a friendly game against Scotland, played at Hampden Park, Glasgow on 13 March 1880. The match ended in a 5–4 victory for the Scots (the most goals England have ever scored in a game and lost). Two of England's goals came from Charlie Bambridge, whereas Scotland's scorers included a hat-trick from George Ker.

Two days later, he played his second (and last) England match, when they met Wales at the Racecourse Ground, Wrexham. Six players made their England debut in this match which England won 3–2 with two goals scored by Francis Sparks of Clapham Rovers. Brindle scored the opening goal in the 50th minute, but had to leave the game 15 minutes later due to injury, and England played on with ten men. He was the first full-back to score a goal for England from open play, which caused a small sensation at the time, as defenders rarely ventured into the opponents' half of the field. Doubt has been cast on the attribution of the goal to Brindle; a Welsh newspaper report of the time claims that this was an own goal by goalkeeper, Harry Hibbott.

In 1881, he was a member of the Darwen team which reached the FA Cup semi-finals, when they were beaten 4–1 by the eventual winners the Old Carthusians. In the book "An English football Internationals Who's Who" written by Douglas Lamming, he describes the Darwen left full-back as: "a powerful strong kicking back and a real workhorse".

During the mid-1880s, he left Darwen and moved to Blackburn Olympic.
