= Frank Forman =

English footballer (1875–1961)

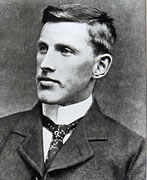

Personal information
- Date of birth: 23 May 1875
- Place of birth: Aston-on-Trent, Derbyshire, England
- Date of death: 4 December 1961 (aged 86)
- Place of death: West Bridgford, England
- Position: Wing half

Youth career
- Aston-on-Trent
- Beeston Town

Senior career*
| Years | Team | Apps | (Gls) |
| 1894 | Derby County | 8 | (0) |
| 1894–1905 | Nottingham Forest | 223 | (23) |

International career
| 1898–1903 | England | 9 | (1) |
- * Club domestic league appearances and goals

Frank Forman (23 May 1875 – 4 December 1961) was an English professional footballer, who was one of three members of the same family who started his professional career with Derby County before joining Nottingham Forest and going on to play for England, for whom he made nine appearances (once as captain). He helped Nottingham Forest to win the FA Cup in 1898.

== Playing career ==
Forman was born in Aston-on-Trent, Derbyshire, the brother of Fred Forman and uncle to Harry Linacre and all three followed a similar career path. Forman played youth football for the local village side before moving up to Beeston Town, where he was spotted by Derby County. County signed him in March 1894 but, after only making only eight appearances, he was transferred to East Midlands rivals Nottingham Forest in December 1894.

By the end of his first full season with Forest he had established himself in the half-back line, generally playing on the right, alongside Scotsmen John McPherson and either Peter McCracken or Alec Stewart, as Forest finished the season in thirteenth place. By 1898, Stewart had been replaced by Willie Wragg as Forest reached the FA Cup Final for the first time, after a controversial semi-final.

In the 1898 FA Cup Semi-final between Southampton and Nottingham Forest, the first match at Bramall Lane, played on 19 March, ended in a 1–1 draw. The replay at Crystal Palace was played four days later in a blizzard. After a scoreless first half (in which Joe Turner missed a penalty for Southampton), in the second half the Saints were on top when, with ten minutes left to play, referee John Lewis stopped the match for a time and the players left the pitch. No sooner had the game restarted than the weather worsened but Lewis decided that the match should continue. Southampton's goalkeeper George Clawley had his eyes "choked with snow" and conceded two goals, from Tom McInnes and Charlie Richards, in the final minutes of the game. Despite Southampton's protests the F.A. decided that the result should stand and Forest were in the final for the first time.

In the final, played at Crystal Palace on 16 April 1898, Forest met Forman's old club, Derby County, who, like Forest, were making their first Cup Final appearance. Derby were favourites to win, having defeated Forest 5–0 in the league a few days earlier. Forest scored first after 19 minutes when Willie Wragg's free-kick fell to Arthur Capes whose shot gave Jack Fryer in the Derby goal little chance. County now began to exert pressure on the Forest defence and Forman, "who was performing splendidly at the back" had to clear efforts from John Goodall and Steve Bloomer. Just after the half-hour point, Derby were level after Forman gave away a free kick on the edge of the penalty area which was whipped in by Joe Leiper for Steve Bloomer to score with a header off the crossbar. Three minutes before the half-time interval, Forest were back in front after a mistake by Fryer allowed Capes a simple tap-in. Although Derby attempted to raise their game in the second half they fell further behind with four minutes left to play when John McPherson scored after John Boag failed to clear a corner, and Forest claimed the Cup with a 3–1 victory.

Forman's first international appearance had come shortly before the FA Cup semi-final when he was selected (together with his Forest teammate Charlie Richards) for the British Home Championship match against Ireland to be played at The Solitude Ground in Belfast on 5 March 1898. Although England were "expected to win with ease", they found the Irish tougher than expected and were fortunate to return home with a 3–2 victory, courtesy of goals from Gilbert Smith, Charlie Athersmith and Tommy Morren.

Forman was not selected for the match against Wales on 28 March, but was picked for the match against Scotland on 2 April, when he played alongside Charles Wreford-Brown who was making his final appearance for the national team. The match, which would decide who would win the 1898 British Home Championship, was played at Celtic Park in Glasgow. The Scots were defeated by a fast and powerful England side who ran out 3–1 winners and took the trophy, with goals from Steve Bloomer (2) and Fred Wheldon.

Forman was selected to play for England in all three matches in the 1899 British Home Championship. For the match against Ireland, played at Roker Park on 2 March 1899, Forman's brother Fred made his international debut. They thus became the first brothers from the same professional club to represent England at the same time, a record that stood until Manchester United's Neville brothers repeated the feat in 1996, nearly a century later. England totally dominated the Irish team and the England forwards "scored at will" with four from Gilbert Smith, three from Jimmy Settle and two each from Fred Forman and Steve Bloomer. Frank Forman also got on the score-sheet with the opening goal as England ran out victors by a 13–2 margin. This is still the record number of goals scored by England in a single match and the highest aggregate goals (15) in a game involving England. Forman retained his place for the next two matches which resulted in victories over Wales (4–0) and Scotland (2–1), and thus England retained the Championship.

He was not selected for the 1900 British Home Championship, his place going to Harry Johnson of Sheffield United, but he was recalled for the match against Scotland on 30 March 1901 which ended in a 2–2 draw.

For the 1902 British Home Championship match against Ireland on 22 March 1902, Forman was appointed captain, with the match ending in a 1–0 victory with a late goal from Jimmy Settle. He retained his place for the next match against Scotland, played at Ibrox on 5 April 1902. This match was the scene of the first Ibrox disaster when a section of the stand collapsed resulting in 25 deaths. The match was declared void by the two Football Associations and was replayed at Villa Park on 3 May, resulting in a 2–2 draw. The proceeds of the re-played match went to the disaster fund.

Forman's final international appearance came against Wales on 2 March 1903 in the only full international match played at Portsmouth's Fratton Park ground. The match ended in a 2–1 victory for England. In his international career, Forman played nine official matches and was never on the losing side, with seven victories and two draws.

In the league, Nottingham Forest were regularly finishing in mid-table, with Forman missing only a small number of matches each season. During Forman's eleven seasons with the club, Forest's best League finish was fourth place gained in 1900–01, a season during which he captained the side. They did, however, have some exciting runs in the FA Cup, reaching the semi-finals in 1900, when they were eventually beaten by Bury 3–2 after extra-time in a replay, and again in 1902, when they lost 3–1 to Southampton who thus gained a measure of revenge for the controversial result of the 1898 semi-final. Forman contributed four goals in the 1902 cup run, including two against Stoke in the third round.

His career at Forest continued until January 1906, with his final appearance coming in the FA Cup. He played a total of 256 matches for Nottingham Forest, scoring 28 goals in all competitions.

== Later career ==
After retiring from football, he went into business as a building contractor with his nephew Harry Linacre, who had joined Forest in 1899 as a goalkeeper and played twice for England in 1905.

He joined Forest's committee in 1903 until his death in 1961. He lived in West Bridgford, close to the City Ground, for the greater part of his life, and died there aged 86 on 4 December 1961.

== Honours ==
Nottingham Forest

- FA Cup winners: 1898
