= List of Nottingham Forest F.C. internationals =

List of footballers

Below is a list of football players who have gained international caps whilst playing club football at Nottingham Forest F.C.

Players have been categorised by their nationality.

England

- Elliot Anderson
- Viv Anderson
- Garry Birtles
- Frank Burton
- John Calvey
- Gary Charles
- Nigel Clough
- Colin Cooper
- Stan Collymore
- Thomas Danks
- Peter Davenport
- Frank Forman
- Fred Forman
- Trevor Francis
- Morgan Gibbs-White
- Arthur Goodyer
- Tommy Graham
- Alan Hinton
- Steve Hodge
- James Iremonger
- Harry Jones
- Teddy Leighton
- Harry Linacre
- Tinsley Lindley
- Larry Lloyd
- Edwin Luntley
- Stuart Pearce
- Charlie Richards
- John Sands
- Peter Shilton
- Albert Smith
- Alf Spouncer
- Steve Stone
- Ian Storey-Moore
- Des Walker
- Neil Webb
- Sam Weller Widdowson
- Frank Wignall
- Tony Woodcock

Wales

- Mark Crossley
- Robert Earnshaw
- Arthur William Green
- Chris Gunter
- Terry Hennessey
- Edwin Hughes
- Wayne Hennessey
- Andy Johnson
- Brennan Johnson
- Albert Jones
- Charlie Jones
- Grenville Morris
- David Phillips
- Ronnie Rees
- Dean Saunders
- Gareth Taylor
- David Vaughan
- Darren Ward
- Neco Williams

Northern Ireland

- Kingsley Black
- Lee Camp
- David Campbell
- Jimmy Chambers
- Sammy Clingan
- Fay Coyle
- Aaron Donnelly
- Alan Fettis
- Gary Fleming
- Tommy Jackson
- Jamie McDonnell
- Liam O'Kane
- Martin O'Neill
- Danny Sonner
- Dale Taylor
- Jamie Ward
- Tommy Wright

Scotland

- Kenny Burns
- Oliver Burke
- Peter Cormack
- Jason Cummings
- Archie Gemmill
- Scot Gemmill
- Frank Gray
- Angus Gunn
- Stewart Imlach
- Scott McKenna
- John Robertson
- Gareth Williams

Republic of Ireland

- Simon Cox
- Miah Dennehy
- Roy Keane
- Noel Kelly
- Daryl Murphy
- Andrew Omobamidele
- Andy Reid
- John Thompson

Ireland

- John Hanna
- Boy Martin
- Gerry Morgan
- Pat Nelis

Norway

- Lars Bohinen
- Alf-Inge Haaland
- Einar Jan Aas
- Kjetil Osvold

Ivory Coast

- Serge Aurier
- Willy Boly
- Ibrahim Sangaré

Netherlands

- Bryan Roy
- Hans van Breukelen
- Pierre van Hooijdonk

New Zealand

- Tyler Bindon
- Marko Stamenić
- Chris Wood

Nigeria

- Ola Aina
- Taiwo Awoniyi
- Emmanuel Dennis

Switzerland

- Remo Freuler
- Dan Ndoye
- Raimondo Ponte

United States

- Ethan Horvath
- Eric Lichaj
- Matt Turner

Algeria

- Rafik Djebbour
- Adlène Guedioura

Australia

- Alan Davidson
- David Tarka

Belgium

- Orel Mangala
- Matz Sels

Canada

- Jim Brennan
- Richie Laryea

Ghana

- Junior Agogo
- André Ayew

Greece

- Apostolos Vellios
- Odysseas Vlachodimos

Iceland

- Brynjar Gunnarsson
- Toddy Örlygsson

Paraguay

- Braian Ojeda
- Ramón Sosa

Senegal

- Moussa Niakhaté
- Cheikhou Kouyaté

Serbia

- Nikola Milenković
- Vladimir Stojković

Angola

- David Carmo

Antigua and Barbuda

- Dexter Blackstock

Brazil

- Murillo

Chile

- Gonzalo Jara

Comoros

- Fouad Bachirou

Costa Rica

- Brandon Aguilera

Croatia

- Nikola Jerkan

Cyprus

- Nikolas Ioannou

Finland

- Thomas Lam

Gambia

- Mustapha Carayol

Iran

- Karim Ansarifard

Jamaica

- Marlon King

Kuwait

- Khaled Al-Rashidi

Lithuania

- Deimantas Petravičius

Montserrat

- Lyle Taylor

Poland

- Radosław Majewski

South Korea

- Hwang Ui-jo

Sweden

- Anthony Elanga

Trinidad and Tobago

- Stern John

Tunisia

- Mohamed Dräger

Zimbabwe

- Tendayi Darikwa
