= Fred Forman =

English footballer (1873-1910)

Personal information
- Full name: Frederick Ralph Forman
- Date of birth: 8 November 1873
- Place of birth: Aston-on-Trent, Derbyshire, England
- Date of death: 14 June 1910 (aged 36)
- Place of death: Skegness, England
- Position: Inside forward

Youth career
- Aston-on-Trent
- Beeston Town

Senior career*
Years	Team	Apps	(Gls)
1892–1894	Derby County	4	(3)
1894–1903	Nottingham Forest	158	(34)

International career
1899	England	3	(3)
- * Club domestic league appearances and goals

Frederick Ralph Forman (8 November 1873 – 14 June 1910) was an English professional footballer, who was one of three members of the same family who started his professional career with Derby County before joining Nottingham Forest and going on to play for England, for whom he made three appearances (scoring three times).

== Playing career ==
Forman was born in Aston-on-Trent, Derbyshire, the elder brother of Frank Forman and uncle to Harry Linacre and all three followed a similar career path. Forman played youth football for the local village side before moving up to Beeston Town, where he was spotted by Derby County. County signed him in January 1892 but, after only making only four appearances, he was transferred to East Midlands rivals Nottingham Forest in 1894, where he was soon joined by his brother.

=== Nottingham Forest ===
Fred Forman made his debut for Nottingham Forest in the United Counties League on 15 February 1894 in the 3–1 victory against Sheffield United at the Town Ground. His league debut was next season on 22 September 1894 against Everton also at the Town Ground.

He soon became an established player on the wings for Forest, putting in the crosses for centre-forwards Tom McInnes and Charlie Richards, contributing a handful of goals each season as Forest finished each season in mid-table. Illness and injury restricted his appearances in 1897–98 and he played no part in Forest's FA Cup success in which they defeated Forman's former club, Derby County in the final 3–1.

Forman continued to appear regularly for Forest over the next few seasons, until he retired in 1903, after making a total of 181 appearances, scoring forty goals.

=== England ===
By the end of the following season (1898–99), he was restored to fitness and was selected for all three England matches in the 1899 British Home Championship, in all of which he played at outside right with his brother Frank at wing half. He made his international debut in the match against Ireland, played at Roker Park, Sunderland on 2 March 1899 when he and Frank became the first brothers from the same professional club to represent England at the same time, a record that stood until Manchester United's Gary and Phil Neville repeated the feat in 1996, nearly a century later. England totally dominated the Irish team and the England forwards "scored at will" with four from Gilbert Smith, three from Jimmy Settle and two each from Fred Forman and Steve Bloomer. Frank Forman also got on the score-sheet with the opening goal as England ran out victors by a 13–2 margin. This is still the record number of goals scored by England in a single match and the highest aggregate goals (15) in a game involving England. Forman retained his place for the next match against Wales, played at Ashton Gate, Bristol on 20 March when he scored the third goal in a 4–0 victory, with two from Bloomer. In his third and final appearance, England defeated Scotland 2–1, and thus England retained the Championship.

Fred Forman went on the Unofficial FA Tour of Germany in November 1899. He played in 3 of the 4 games and scored 4 goals.

== Career post football ==
After retiring from football, he pursued his profession as a railway draughtsman. He died of tuberculosis on 14 June 1910, aged 36.

== Career statistics ==
=== Club ===
Club	Season	League			FA Cup		Total	
Club	Season	Division	Apps	Goals	Apps	Goals	Apps	Goals
Derby County	1892–93	First Division						
Derby County	1893–94	First Division						
Derby County	Total			3				
Nottingham Forest	1893–94	First Division	0	0	0	0	0	0
Nottingham Forest	1894–95	First Division	13	3	2	0	15	3
Nottingham Forest	1895–96	First Division	22	3	0	0	22	3
Nottingham Forest	1896–97	First Division	21	6	4	2	25	8
Nottingham Forest	1897–98	First Division	7	0	0	0	7	0
Nottingham Forest	1898–99	First Division	11	0	3	2	14	2
Nottingham Forest	1899-1900	First Division	22	6	4	0	26	6
Nottingham Forest	1900–01	First Division	28	6	3	1	31	7
Nottingham Forest	1901–02	First Division	15	4	4	0	19	4
Nottingham Forest	1902–03	First Division	18	3	3	1	21	4
Nottingham Forest	Total		157	31	23	6	180	37
Career total				34				

=== International ===
England senior team
Year	Apps	Goals
1899	3	3
Total	3	3

=== International goals ===
England score listed first, score column indicates score after each Fred Forman goal.

International goals scored by Fred Forman
No	Date	Venue	Opponent	Score	Result	Competition	Ref
1	18 February 1899	Roker Park, Sunderland, England	Ireland	2–0	13–2	1898–99 British Home Championship	
2	18 February 1899	Roker Park, Sunderland, England	Ireland	6–0	13–2	1898–99 British Home Championship	
3	8 April 1899	Ashton Gate, Bristol, England	Wales	3–0	4-0	1898–99 British Home Championship	

Unofficial International goals scored by Fred Forman
No	Date	Venue	Opponent	Score	Result	Competition	Ref
1	23 November 1899	Athletik-Sportsplatz, Berlin, Germany	Germany		13–2	FA Tour of Germany – 1899	
2	23 November 1899	Athletik-Sportsplatz, Berlin, Germany	Germany		13–2	FA Tour of Germany – 1899	
3	24 November 1899	Athletik-Sportsplatz, Berlin, Germany	Germany		10–2	FA Tour of Germany – 1899	
4	24 November 1899	Athletik-Sportsplatz, Berlin, Germany	Germany		10–2	FA Tour of Germany – 1899	
