= List of Scotland national football team hat-tricks =

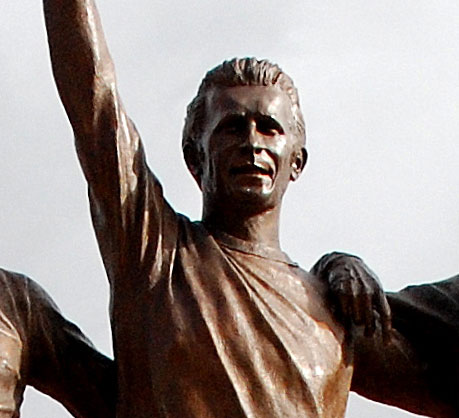
Denis Law, who scored three hat tricks for Scotland, pictured here in a statue outside Old Trafford.

Since Scotland's first international association football match on 30 November 1872, 34 players have scored three goals (a hat trick) or more in a game. The first player to do so was John McDougall, in a match against England on 2 May 1878. The most goals scored by a single player in a match is five, scored by Hughie Gallacher in a 1928–29 British Home Championship match against Ireland on 23 February 1929 and Joe Harper in a friendly against a Canada Olympic team on 13 June 1967, although some reports credit at least one of their goals to other players. Denis Law is the only player to have scored four goals in a single match more than once. Robert Smyth McColl, Gallacher and Law are tied for the most hat tricks for Scotland's international team, with three hat tricks each.

The most recent player to score a hat-trick for Scotland was Ché Adams, in a friendly against Liechtenstein on 9 June 2025. Steven Fletcher (twice), Robert Snodgrass, James Forrest and John McGinn and Adams have all scored hat tricks for Scotland since 2015. The first of those ended a long wait for a Scotland hat-trick dating back to 17 May 1969, when Colin Stein scored four goals in the 8–0 1970 FIFA World Cup qualifying win over Cyprus.

Scotland have conceded eight hat-tricks in total, with the first scored by England's Fred Spiksley in 1893 – this does not appear in all records, with the last goal of a 5–2 scoreline being mistakenly attributed to Jack Reynolds for some time. The second instance, 62 years later, featuring four goals by Dennis Wilshaw of England on 2 April 1955 in a 1954–55 British Home Championship match, remains the highest individual player total for either team in the fixture and the only occasion an opposing player has scored four times in a match.

Nico Claesen of Belgium was the first player from outside the Home Nations to score a hat trick against Scotland, in the UEFA Euro 1988 qualifying match on 1 April 1987. Scotland had only conceded five hat tricks until the 2003–04 season when the feat was achieved against them in successive matches, first by Ruud van Nistelrooy for the Netherlands in a UEFA Euro 2004 qualifying playoff match against them, and then by Robert Earnshaw for Wales in a friendly. The most recent hat trick conceded by Scotland was in May 2012, when Landon Donovan scored three times in a 5–1 win for the United States in a friendly.

== Hat tricks for Scotland ==
Key

More than a hat-trick scored *

Table

Wartime internationals, not regarded as official matches, are not included in the list. The result is presented with Scotland's score first.

Date	Goals	Player	Opponent	Venue	Competition	Result	Ref^{[a]}
2 March 1878	3	John McDougall	England	Hampden Park [I], Glasgow	Friendly	7–2	
13 March 1880	3	George Ker	England	Hampden Park [I], Glasgow	Friendly	5–4	
12 March 1881	3	John Smith	England	Kennington Oval, London	Friendly	6–1	
14 March 1885	3	Alex Higgins	Ireland	Hampden Park [II], Glasgow	1884–85 British Home Championship	8–2	
23 March 1885^{[b]}	3	Joseph Lindsay	Wales	Acton Park, Wrexham	1884–85 British Home Championship	8–1	^{[b]}
20 March 1886	3	Charles Heggie	Ireland	Ulster Ground, Belfast	1885–86 British Home Championship	7–2	
24 March 1888	4*	William Dickson	Ireland	Solitude Ground, Belfast	1887–88 British Home Championship	10–2	
9 March 1889	3	Willie Groves	Ireland	Ibrox Park [I], Glasgow	1888–89 British Home Championship	7–0	
22 March 1890	4*	William Paul	Wales	Underwood Park, Paisley	1889–90 British Home Championship	5–0	
29 March 1889	3	Gilbert Rankin	Ireland	Ulster Ground, Belfast	1889–90 British Home Championship	4–1	
18 March 1893	3	John Barker	Wales	Racecourse Ground, Wrexham	1892–93 British Home Championship	8–0	
18 March 1893	4*	Jake Madden	Wales	Racecourse Ground, Wrexham	1892–93 British Home Championship	8–0	
19 March 1898	3	James Gillespie	Wales	Fir Park, Motherwell	1897–98 British Home Championship	5–2	
18 March 1899	3	Robert Smyth McColl	Wales	Racecourse Ground, Wrexham	1898–99 British Home Championship	6–0	
25 March 1899	3	Robert Smyth McColl	Ireland	Celtic Park, Glasgow	1898–99 British Home Championship	9–1	
7 April 1900	3	Robert Smyth McColl	England	Celtic Park, Glasgow	1899–1900 British Home Championship	4–1	
23 February 1901	4*	Sandy McMahon	Ireland	Celtic Park, Glasgow	1900–01 British Home Championship	11–0	
23 February 1901	4*	Robert Hamilton	Ireland	Celtic Park, Glasgow	1900–01 British Home Championship	11–0	
1 March 1902	3	Robert Hamilton	Ireland	Grosvenor Park, Belfast	1901–02 British Home Championship	5–1	
14 March 1908	4*	Jimmy Quinn	Ireland	Dalymount Park, Dublin	1907–08 British Home Championship	5–0	
27 February 1926	3	Hughie Gallacher	Ireland	Ibrox Park, Glasgow	1925–26 British Home Championship	4–0	
27 February 1928	3	Alex Jackson	England	Wembley Stadium, London	1927–28 British Home Championship	5–1	
27 October 1928	3	Hughie Gallacher	Wales	Ibrox Park, Glasgow	1927–28 British Home Championship	4–2	
23 February 1929	5*	Hughie Gallacher^{[c]}	Ireland	Windsor Park, Belfast	1928–29 British Home Championship	7–3	
26 May 1929	3	Alec Cheyne	Norway	Brann Stadion, Bergen	Friendly	7–3	
26 May 1932	3	Neil Dewar	France	Stade Olympique, Colombes	Friendly	3–1	
1 October 1949	3	Henry Morris	Ireland	Windsor Park, Belfast	1949–50 British Home Championship / 1950 FIFA World Cup qualifying	8–2	
1 November 1950	4*	Billy Steel	Ireland	Hampden Park, Glasgow	1950–51 British Home Championship	6–2	
20 May 1951	3	George Hamilton	Belgium	Stade Heysel, Brussels	Friendly	5–0	
30 April 1952	3	Lawrie Reilly	United States	Hampden Park, Glasgow	Friendly	6–0	
8 May 1957	3	Jackie Mudie	Spain	Hampden Park, Glasgow	1958 FIFA World Cup qualification	4–2	
7 October 1961	3	Alex Scott	Northern Ireland	Windsor Park, Belfast	1961–62 British Home Championship	6–1	
7 November 1962	4*	Denis Law	Northern Ireland	Windsor Park, Belfast	1962–63 British Home Championship	5–1	
4 June 1963	3	Denis Law^{[d]}	Norway	Brann Stadion, Bergen	Friendly	3–4	
7 November 1963	4*	Denis Law	Norway	Hampden Park, Glasgow	Friendly	6–1	
13 June 1967	5*	Joe Harper^{[f]}	Canada Olympic	Alexander Park, Winnipeg	Friendly	7–2	
17 May 1969	4*	Colin Stein	Cyprus	Hampden Park, Glasgow	1970 FIFA World Cup qualification	8–0	
29 March 2015	3	Steven Fletcher	Gibraltar	Hampden Park, Glasgow	UEFA Euro 2016 qualifying	6–1	
11 October 2015	3	Steven Fletcher	Gibraltar	Estádio Algarve, Faro	UEFA Euro 2016 qualifying	6–0	
4 September 2016	3	Robert Snodgrass	Malta	Ta' Qali National Stadium, Ta' Qali	2018 FIFA World Cup qualification	5–1	
20 November 2018	3	James Forrest	Israel	Hampden Park, Glasgow	2018–19 UEFA Nations League	3–2	
13 October 2019	3	John McGinn	San Marino	Hampden Park, Glasgow	UEFA Euro 2020 qualifying	6–0	
9 June 2025	3	Ché Adams	Liechtenstein	Rheinpark Stadion, Vaduz	Friendly	4–0	

=== Statistics ===
The following table lists the number of hat-tricks scored by players who have scored two or more hat-tricks.

Multiple hat-tricks
Rank	Player	Hat-tricks
1	Hughie Gallacher	3
1	Denis Law	3
1	Robert Smyth McColl	3
2	Steven Fletcher	2
2	Robert Hamilton	2

Hat-tricks by opponent
Rank	Opponent	Hat-tricks
1	Ireland	14
2	Wales	7
3	England	5
4	Norway	3
4	Gibraltar	3
6	Northern Ireland	2
7	Belgium	1
7	Canada Olympic	1
7	Cyprus	1
7	France	1
7	Israel	1
7	Liechtenstein	1
7	Malta	1
7	San Marino	1
7	Spain	1
7	United States	1
	Total	44

== Hat-tricks conceded by Scotland ==
Wartime internationals, not regarded as official matches, are not included in the list. The result is presented with Scotland's score first.

Scotland have conceded eight hat-tricks, five of which have been scored by players from the Home Nations.

Date	Goals	Player	Opponent	Venue	Competition	Result	Ref^{[a]}
1 April 1893^{e}	3	Fred Spiksley	England	Athletic Ground, Richmond	1892–93 British Home Championship	2–5	
2 April 1955	4*	Dennis Wilshaw	England	Wembley Stadium, London	1954–55 British Home Championship	2–7	
15 April 1961	3	Jimmy Greaves	England	Wembley Stadium, London	1960–61 British Home Championship	3–9	
19 May 1979	3	John Toshack	Wales	Ninian Park, Cardiff	1978–79 British Home Championship	0–3	
1 April 1987	3	Nico Claesen	Belgium	Constant Vanden Stock Stadium, Brussels	UEFA Euro 1988 qualifying	1–4	
19 November 2003	3	Ruud van Nistelrooy	Netherlands	Amsterdam Arena, Amsterdam	UEFA Euro 2004 qualifying playoff	0–6	
18 February 2004	3	Robert Earnshaw	Wales	Millennium Stadium, Cardiff	Friendly	0–4	
27 May 2012	3	Landon Donovan	United States	EverBank Field, Jacksonville	Friendly	1–5	

== Notes ==
^{a} A full list of Scotland results for 1872–1880, 1881–1890, 1891–1900, 1901–1910, 1911–1920, 1921–1930, 1931–1939, 1946–1950, 1951–1955, 1956–1960, 1961–1965, 1966–1970, 1971–1975, 1976–1980, 1981–1985, 1986–1990, 1991–1995, 1996–2001, 2002–2005, 2006–2010, 2011–2015, 2016–2020, 2021–2022 are listed on the RSSSF website. Retrieved 30 March 2023.
^{b} Some sources attribute another goal in this match, elsewhere credited to Robert Calderwood, to William Anderson – this would make a hat-trick for Anderson, completed earlier chronologically than that of Joseph Lindsay.
^{c} Hughie Gallacher is credited with Scotland's sixth goal (his fifth) in some sources, although RSSSF credit it to Alex James.
^{d} This is Scotland's only hat-trick in a game that they lost.
^{e} One of the goals is credited to Jack Reynolds in some sources.
^{f} Joe Harper is credited with five goals in some sources, but only three in others.
