= Harry Linacre =

English footballer (1880–1957)

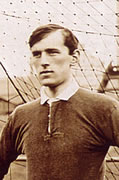

Personal information
- Full name: James Henry Linacre
- Date of birth: 20 June 1880
- Place of birth: Aston-on-Trent, Derbyshire, England
- Date of death: 11 May 1957 (aged 76)
- Place of death: Nottingham, England
- Position: Goalkeeper

Youth career
- Loughborough Grammar School
- Aston-on-Trent
- Draycott Mills

Senior career*
Years	Team	Apps	(Gls)
1899	Derby County	2	(0)
1899–1909	Nottingham Forest	308	(0)

International career
1905	England	2	(0)
- * Club domestic league appearances and goals

James Henry Linacre (20 June 1880 – 11 May 1957) was an English professional footballer who played as a goalkeeper. He was also one of three members of the same family who started his professional career with Derby County before joining Nottingham Forest and going on to play for England. He took part in the first foreign tour by Nottingham Forest to South America where the red shirts are said to have given inspiration to Club Atlético Independiente.

== Club career ==
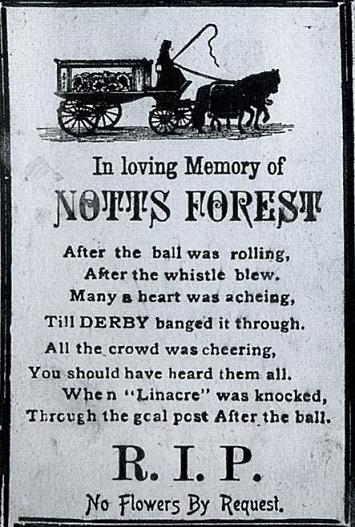
The mock funeral card

Linacre was born to farmer James Anthony and his wife Annie Linacre. They lived on Derby Road in Aston-on-Trent, Derbyshire. Linacre was the nephew of fellow footballers Fred Forman and Frank Forman and all three followed a similar career path. Linacre played for his village side and the side at nearby Draycott and for Loughborough Grammar School before being signed by Derby County. However, he was there for only two games.

Linacre joined Forest in 1899. A card has been found that records a match between Nottingham Forest and Derby: it would appear from the accompanying verse that Derby won as a result of Linacre travelling backwards with the ball through his own net.

=== Foreign tour ===
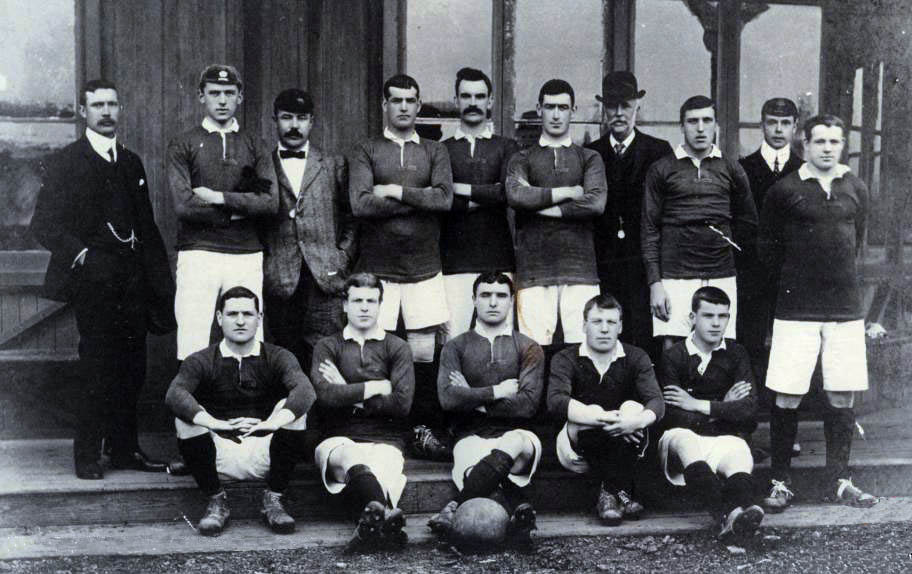
The 1905 touring side for South America. Linacre is on the back row, on the left, bar one

Linacre was chosen to go on the first foreign tour with his Nottingham club in 1905. In the same year as he appeared for England, he toured Uruguay and Argentina. The trip had been organised at the club after a guaranteed $200 fee was offered. Thirteen players and two officials were dispatched on 19 May, three weeks after the football season ended. The journey out to South America took three weeks and they had to run around the steamship Danube's decks to keep in training.

In total, there were eight matches in South America and sixty goals were scored with only three being against Nottingham Forest, who did not lose a match on the tour. It is said that the Argentinian team Club Atlético Independiente changed their colours to red after seeing the Nottingham Forest players play. The tour started at Montevideo and then had a number of matches against Argentinian teams, firstly at Santa Fe and then in Buenos Aires. The party consisted of (see picture) Bob Norris, Harry Linacre, H.Hallam (Secretary), C.Clifford, Charles Craig, William Shearman, H.S. Radford (Vice President), Sam Timmins, Alf Spouncer, Fred Lessons, (Front Row L-R) – Walter Dudley, Thomas Davies, Thomas Niblo, George Henderson and Albert Holmes.

Linacre went on to make over 330 appearances for Nottingham Forest, in all competitions.

== International career ==
Linacre was chosen to play for his country and he played twice for England in 1905. However, his England career lasted just five days. On 27 March 1905, when Linacre was aged 24 years, he was the goalie for 279 days against Wales. His last cap was against Scotland on 1 April 1905. During those two matches, he only conceded one goal to Wales in the first match. Both matches were England victories.

== Later career ==
After retiring from football in 1909, Linacre went into business as a building contractor with his uncle Frank Forman. Frank had followed a similar career to Linacre, but he continued his association with the club after he stopped playing. Linacre died in Nottingham in 1957.
