= Adam Scott (disambiguation) =

Adam Scott (born 1973) is an American actor, comedian, producer, and podcaster.

Adam Scott may also refer to:

- Adam Scott (footballer) (1871–?), Scottish footballer
- Adam Sherriff Scott (1887–1980), Canadian painter
- Adam Scott (golfer) (born 1980), Australian golfer
- Adam Scott, candidate from the Green Party of Ontario in the 2003 Ontario provincial election
- Adam Scott Collegiate and Vocational Institute, a high school and middle school in Peterborough, Ontario, Canada

== See also ==
- Scott Adams (disambiguation)
