= 1898–99 British Home Championship =

Tournament details
- Host country: England, Ireland, Scotland and Wales
- Dates: 18 February – 8 April 1899
- Teams: 4

Final positions
- Champions: England (9th title)
- Runners-up: Scotland

Tournament statistics
- Matches played: 6
- Goals scored: 39 (6.5 per match)
- Top scorer: (Scotland) Bob McColl (6 goals)

The 1898–99 British Home Championship was an international football tournament between the British Home Nations. A very high scoring affair, the competition featured the highest scoreline ever achieved in the Home Championships when England defeated Ireland 13–2 in Sunderland, including a hat-trick in four minutes from Gilbert Smith. It was the first of two particularly heavy defeats for the Irish side, who nevertheless still managed to finish third, courtesy of a victory over Wales.

England's win over Ireland was the start of the tournament and placed them immediately on top of the table, a position Ireland joined them in with their 1–0 victory over Wales in the second game. Scotland began their bid for the title in the third match with a strong 6–0 win over Wales in Wrexham. Wales' poor competition was finished in their next game when England again took top position by beating them 4–0. In the penultimate game, Scotland joined England at the top of the table with a 9–1 demolition of Ireland, who had conceded 21 goals in two games but still finished third. In the deciding match, England and Scotland both played a strong game but England eventually proved stronger, winning 2–1.

== Table ==
Team	Pld	W	D	L	GF	GA	GD	Pts
England (C)	3	3	0	0	19	3	+16	6
Scotland	3	2	0	1	16	3	+13	4
Ireland	3	1	0	2	4	22	−18	2
Wales	3	0	0	3	0	11	−11	0

Rules for classification: 1) points. The points system worked as follows: 2 points for a win and 1 point for a draw.
(C) Champions

== Results ==
18 February 1899

England	13–2	Ireland
Smith 39', 59', 60', 63'; Settle 53', 55', 80'; Bloomer 40', 89'; Forman 20', 52'; F. Forman 15'; Athersmith 25'	(Match summary)	McAllen 65' (pen.); Campbell 88'

Roker Park, Sunderland

4 March 1899

Ireland	1–0	Wales
Meldon 60'

Grosvenor Park, Belfast

18 March 1899

Wales	0–6	Scotland
		Campbell 22', 55'; McColl 50', 75', 85'; Marshall 70'

Racecourse Ground, Wrexham
Attendance: 12,000
Referee: Charles E. Sutcliffe (England)

20 March 1899

England	4–0	Wales
Bloomer 44', 86'; Forman 60'; Needham 30'

Ashton Gate, Bristol

25 March 1899

Scotland	9–1	Ireland
McColl 5', 25', 47'; Christie 10'; Hamilton 20', 65'; Bell 35'; Berry 70'; Campbell 80'		Goodall 54'

Celtic Park, Glasgow
Attendance: 12,000
Referee: Charles E. Sutcliffe (England)

8 April 1899

England	2–1	Scotland
Smith 25'; Settle 40'		Hamilton 52'

Villa Park, Birmingham
Attendance: 25,590
Referee: James Torrans (Ireland)

== Winning squad ==
- England

Name	Apps/Goals by opponent			Total	
Name	(Wales) WAL	(Ireland) IRE	(Scotland) SCO	Apps	Goals
Gilbert Smith	1	1/4	1/1	3	5
Steve Bloomer	1/2	1/2	1	3	4
Jimmy Settle	1	1/3	1/1	3	4
Fred Forman	1/1	1/2	1	3	3
Charlie Athersmith	1	1/1	1	3	1
Frank Forman	1	1/1	1	3	1
Ernest Needham	1/1	1	1	3	1
Jimmy Crabtree	1	1	1	3	0
Jack Robinson	1		1	2	0
Harry Thickitt	1		1	2	0
Billy Williams	1	1		2	0
Raby Howell			1	1	0
Philip Bach		1		1	0
Jack Hillman		1		1	0
