= 1897–98 British Home Championship =

Tournament details
- Host country: England, Ireland, Scotland and Wales
- Dates: 19 February – 2 April 1898
- Teams: 4

Final positions
- Champions: England (8th title)
- Runners-up: Scotland

Tournament statistics
- Matches played: 6
- Goals scored: 23 (3.83 per match)
- Top scorer(s): (England) Fred Wheldon (Scotland) James Gillespie (3 goals)

The 1897–98 British Home Championship was the fifteenth edition of the annual football tournament played between the British Home Nations. England won the title after whitewashing all three opponents and taking the maximum six points. Scotland came second after winning two of their games whilst Ireland came third following a close victory over Wales in Llandudno.

Ireland's win over Wales was the first match of the tournament and gave Ireland a short lived advantage in the competition. England ended this advantage in the second game with a close 3–2 win over the Irish in Belfast and Scotland joined the other two on two points with a 5–2 thrashing of the Welsh. Scotland then briefly took the lead with a win over Ireland in Belfast before England joined them by beating Wales by the same scoreline in Wrexham. In the final and deciding match, played at Celtic Park in Glasgow, the Scots were defeated by a fast and powerful England side who ran out 3–1 winners and took the championship.

== Table ==
Team	Pld	W	D	L	GF	GA	GD	Pts
England (C)	3	3	0	0	9	3	+6	6
Scotland	3	2	0	1	9	5	+4	4
Ireland	3	1	0	2	3	6	−3	2
Wales	3	0	0	3	2	9	−7	0

Rules for classification: 1) points. The points system worked as follows: 2 points for a win and 1 point for a draw.
(C) Champions

== Results ==
19 February 1898

Wales	0 – 1	Ireland
		85' Jack Peden

The Oval, Llandudno

5 March 1898

Ireland	2 – 3	England
15' John Pyper; 70' Joe McAllen		37' Gilbert Smith; 40' Charlie Athersmith; 50' Tommy Morren

Solitude, Belfast

19 March 1898

Scotland	5 – 2	Wales
James Gillespie 12', 20', 61'; James McKee 29', 40'		44' Thomas Thomas; 89' Morgan Morgan-Owen

Fir Park, Motherwell
Attendance: 3,500
Referee: William H. Stacey (England)

26 March 1898

Ireland	0 – 3	Scotland
	Scottish FA	30' Tommy Robertson; 42' Bob McColl; 70' William Stewart

Solitude, Belfast
Attendance: 5,000
Referee: John Lewis (England)

28 March 1898

Wales	0 – 3	England
		9', 75' Fred Wheldon; 88' Gilbert Smith

Racecourse Ground, Wrexham

2 April 1898

Scotland	1 – 3	England
Jimmy Millar 48'		3' Fred Wheldon; 23', 72' Steve Bloomer

Celtic Park, Glasgow
Attendance: 40,000
Referee: Thomas Robertson (Scotland)

== Winning squad ==
- England

Name	Apps/Goals by opponent			Total	
Name	(Wales) WAL	(Ireland) IRE	(Scotland) SCO	Apps	Goals
Fred Wheldon	1/2	1	1/1	3	3
Gilbert Smith	1/1	1/1	1	3	2
Charlie Athersmith	1	1/1	1	3	1
Jack Robinson	1	1	1	3	0
William Oakley	1	1	1	3	0
Billy Williams	1	1	1	3	0
Frank Forman		1	1	2	0
Ernest Needham	1		1	2	0
Fred Spiksley	1		1	2	0
Steve Bloomer			1/2	1	2
Tommy Morren		1/1		1	1
Charles Wreford-Brown			1	1	0
Jimmy Turner		1		1	0
Charlie Richards		1		1	0
Ben Garfield		1		1	0
Tom Booth	1			1	0
John Goodall	1			1	0
Tom Perry	1			1	0
