= Steven Fletcher (footballer) =

Scottish footballer (born 1987)

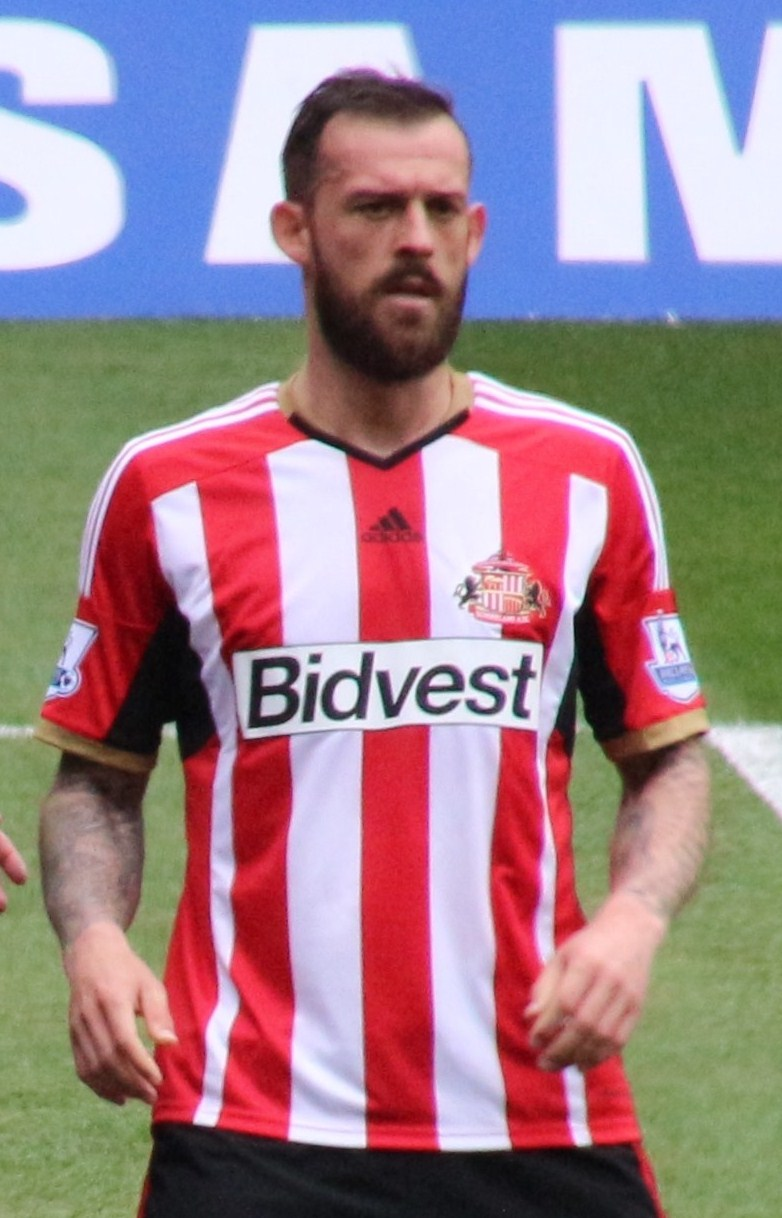
- Fletcher playing for Sunderland in 2015

Personal information
- Full name: Steven Kenneth Fletcher
- Date of birth: 26 March 1987 (age 39)
- Place of birth: Shrewsbury, England
- Height: 6 ft 1 in (1.86 m)
- Position: Striker

Youth career
- 2000–2004: Hibernian

Senior career*
Years	Team	Apps	(Gls)
2004–2009	Hibernian	156	(43)
2009–2010	Burnley	35	(8)
2010–2012	Wolverhampton Wanderers	61	(22)
2012–2016	Sunderland	94	(23)
2016	→ Marseille (loan)	12	(2)
2016–2020	Sheffield Wednesday	124	(36)
2020–2022	Stoke City	72	(12)
2022–2023	Dundee United	33	(9)
2023–2025	Wrexham	73	(16)
Total		660	(171)

International career
2007	Scotland U20	6	(1)
2006–2008	Scotland U21	7	(5)
2007	Scotland B	1	(0)
2008–2018	Scotland	33	(10)
- * Club domestic league appearances and goals

Steven Kenneth Fletcher (born 26 March 1987) is a former professional footballer who played as a striker.

Fletcher began his club career with Hibernian, playing in 156 Scottish Premier League games and scoring 43 goals. English club Burnley paid a club record transfer fee of £3 million to sign Fletcher in June 2009. He was their top goalscorer in the 2009–10 season with eight league goals, but the club were relegated from the Premier League.

Fletcher was transferred soon afterwards to Wolverhampton Wanderers on a club record fee of £6.5 million. He scored 24 goals in 68 appearances for Wolves, but the club were relegated from the Premier League in 2012. Fletcher was then transferred to Premier League side Sunderland for £12 million. He played 108 matches and scored 23 goals for them, also spending half a season on loan at French club Marseille in 2016. He then joined EFL Championship club Sheffield Wednesday. Fletcher spent four seasons at Hillsborough scoring 38 goals. He subsequently played two seasons with Stoke City, and one season with Dundee United. In 2023 he joined League Two side Wrexham, scoring eight goals in 33 games as the team finished in second place with promotion to League One on their first attempt. In 2024 he again scored eight goals for Wrexham as the team finished in second place with promotion to the Championship.

Fletcher played for the Scotland under-19 team that finished runners up to Spain in the 2006 under-19 European Championship. He has since represented Scotland at full international level, and in 2015 became the first player since 1969 to score a hat-trick for Scotland.

== Early life ==
Fletcher, who was born in Shrewsbury, Shropshire, spent much of his early years living on British Army bases in England and Germany where his Liverpudlian soldier father, Kenny Fletcher was based. His father died from cancer aged 37 when Fletcher was aged only 10, prompting his Scottish mother, Mary, to relocate him and his younger sister Bree to Hamilton, South Lanarkshire to be closer to her family. Hibernian youth coach John Park, also from Hamilton, spotted his footballing talent and the youngster joined the Leith club's youth network aged 13. He was selected for the Lanarkshire Schools XI in 2002 while a pupil at Earnock High School.

== Club career ==
=== Hibernian ===
Fletcher made his debut for Hibs on 10 April 2004, replacing Garry O'Connor for the final eight minutes in a 3–0 Scottish Premier League win over Kilmarnock at Easter Road. He totalled five appearances that season, making his first start on 15 May in the final fixture, a 4–1 loss at Livingston.

He became a first team regular in the 2004–05 season, playing 26 times and scoring five goals. His first goal came on 16 October, set up by O'Connor to conclude a 2–0 home win over Dundee United. On 19 March, as a 61st-minute substitute for Scott Brown, he scored twice in a 4–1 win at Dunfermline Athletic, also assisting one of Derek Riordan's brace.

In the 2005–06 season, Fletcher scored 10 goals in just 1,966 minutes on the pitch, which approximated to a goal every other game. He took on a more prominent role in the 2006–07 season after Hibs had sold star strikers O'Connor and Derek Riordan. Fletcher scored in Hibernian's 5–0 Intertoto Cup win over Dinaburg and played regularly during the league season. The highlight of the season for Fletcher and Hibs was when he scored two goals in the 5–1 win over Kilmarnock in the 2007 League Cup Final.

Fletcher became Hibs' main striker during the 2007–08 season. He scored his first professional hat-trick in a 4–2 win over Gretna and won the Scottish Football Writers' Young Player of the Year Award. Fletcher was touted for a move to Real Madrid due to Madrid's scouts watching him. In November 2008 it was reported that Manchester City was interested in signing Fletcher and the Daily Record reported on 1 January 2009 that Middlesbrough were "preparing" a £2.5 million offer. Towards the end of the January transfer window, Hibs rejected an approach from Celtic. Fletcher then publicly pleaded for Hibs to agree a deal with Celtic, arguing "for the development of my career it is time to move to a bigger club", but Hibs refused to sell him. Fletcher finished the season by being voted the Scottish Football Writers Young Player of the Season again.

=== Burnley ===
On 26 June 2009, Burnley offered £2.75 million for Fletcher. A few days later, Hibs accepted an offer of £3 million plus incentives based on appearances for Burnley. Fletcher completed the move when he agreed a four-year contract with the Lancashire club, who paid a club record transfer fee to obtain his services. After the move was completed, former Hibs striker Keith Wright questioned whether Fletcher was ready to play in the Premier League. His first competitive goals for Burnley came when he scored a brace in a 2–1 League Cup win at Hartlepool United on 25 August. He scored his first goal in the Premier League on 3 October, against Birmingham City. Fletcher was Burnley's top goalscorer during the 2009–10 season, but the club were relegated from the Premier League. He was named Burnley Players' Player of the year for the season.

=== Wolverhampton Wanderers ===
After Burnley were relegated to the Championship, Fletcher signed a four-year contract, with the option of a fifth year, with Premier League side Wolverhampton Wanderers on 3 June 2010. He was transferred for around £6.5 million, which matched the Wolves club record. Fletcher scored on his debut for Wolves, winning 2–1 against Stoke City on the opening day of the season at Molineux. He scored five goals in five league games for the club near the end of the season, including two against West Bromwich Albion at Molineux in the Black Country derby, earning his side a 3–1 win over their local rivals and getting them out of the bottom three.

Fletcher began the 2011–12 Premier League with a headed goal in the opening day victory against Blackburn. Despite Fletcher scoring 12 goals during the league season, Wolves were relegated from the Premier League. Fletcher submitted a transfer request on 8 August 2012, after media reports linked Sunderland with the player.

=== Sunderland ===
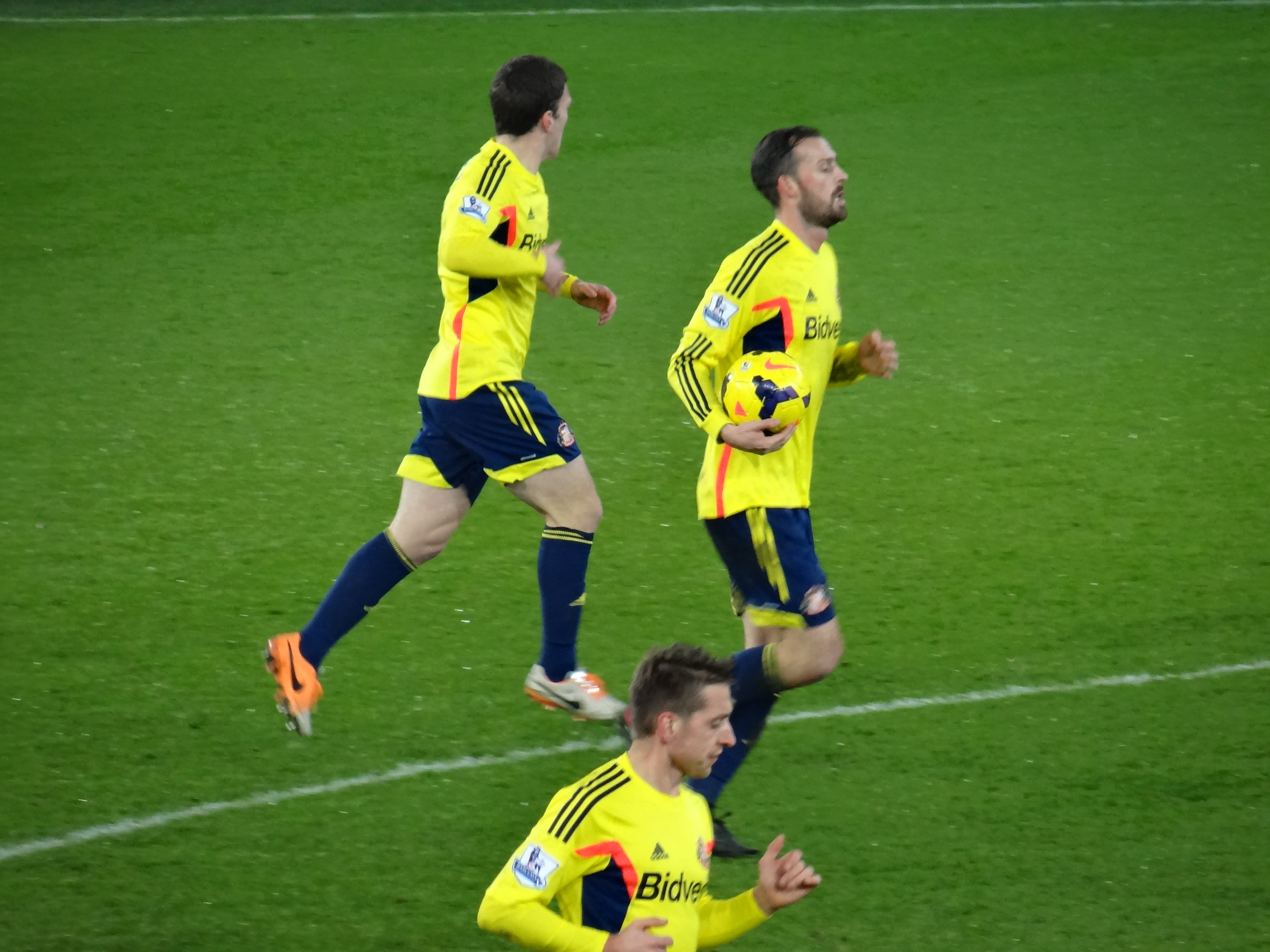
Fletcher (right) playing for Sunderland against Cardiff City in 2013

On 22 August 2012, Wolves accepted an offer from Sunderland of £12 million. Fletcher signed a four-year contract with Sunderland. He made his first appearance for Sunderland in a 2–0 win against Football League Two club Morecambe in the Football League Cup. Fletcher then scored his first two goals in his Premier League debut for Sunderland, a 2–2 draw at Swansea City. He also scored once in each of his next three league matches, against Liverpool, West Ham United and Wigan Athletic. He won the Premier League Player of the Month award for September. After a run of games without a win, an injury sustained playing for Scotland in March 2013 ruled Fletcher out for the rest of the 2012–13 season.

Fletcher was handed the number 9 shirt for the 2013–14 season, and returned to the bench for a 4–2 League Cup win against Milton Keynes Dons. Upon his Premier League return after a sustained period of time out injured, he came off the bench to score in the 3–1 defeat against Crystal Palace on 31 August. On 27 September, Fletcher was ruled out for "four to six" weeks, with a shoulder injury; the result of a heavy fall during the previous week's match against West Brom. Fletcher scored his second goal of the season on 27 October 2013, netting the first in a 2–1 win against local rivals Newcastle United. It was also Sunderland's first win of the season. On 28 December 2013, Fletcher scored his third goal of the season, in a 2–2 draw against Cardiff City. He did not score again in the 2013–14 season, during which Sunderland reached the League Cup final and produced a late run of form to avoid relegation.

On 4 October 2014, Fletcher netted twice and assisted Connor Wickham in a 3–1 win against Stoke City. Fletcher was at the double again almost a month later, when he netted twice against Crystal Palace at Selhurst Park. His fifth goal of the season came on the last day of the season, on 24 May 2015, where he scored a header to open the scoring in a 1–3 defeat away to Chelsea.

On 25 October 2015, Fletcher scored the third and final goal of the match in the Tyne–Wear derby against arch-rivals Newcastle in a 3–0 win.

==== Marseille (loan) ====
On 1 February 2016, Fletcher joined Ligue 1 side Marseille on loan until the end of the season. He made his debut for the club six days later, coming on as a second-half substitute for Michy Batshuayi in a 2–1 loss to rivals Paris Saint-Germain in Le Classique at the Stade Vélodrome. On 11 February, Fletcher made his full debut in a 2–0 Coupe de France win at fourth-tier amateur side Trélissac, setting up Romain Alessandrini for the first goal before netting himself in the 87th minute.

Fletcher scored his first league goal for l'OM on 6 March, equalising in a 1–1 home draw against Toulouse, and added his only other strike for them on 14 May to do the same away to Troyes in the last game of the season, also winning a penalty that he took himself and was saved by Matthieu Dreyer. A week later he started in the 2016 Coupe de France Final at the Stade de France, a 4–2 loss to PSG.

=== Sheffield Wednesday ===
Following his release from Sunderland, Fletcher joined Sheffield Wednesday on a free transfer on 1 July 2016, signing a four-year contract. He made his EFL Championship debut on 7 August, starting in a 1–0 home victory against Aston Villa, in which he was substituted in the first half due to a head injury from a collision with Tommy Elphick. On 10 September, he scored his first goal for the Owls to open a 2–1 win over Wigan at Hillsborough.

On 20 January 2017, substitute Fletcher was one of three players sent off in a 2–1 loss at Brighton & Hove Albion, for headbutting Dale Stephens. He was punished with a three-match suspension. He scored both goals on 4 April as Wednesday won at neighbours Rotherham United, his first strikes since the previous December. Wednesday made the play-offs and Fletcher scored the goal that gave them the lead in the semi-final against fellow Yorkshire team Huddersfield Town, but was substituted before they lost on penalties.

On 24 June 2020, it was announced that he had declined a new contract and would be leaving the club on the 30 June.

=== Stoke City ===
On 14 August 2020, it was announced that Fletcher had signed a contract with Stoke City joining ex Sheffield Wednesday teammate Morgan Fox. He scored his first goal for Stoke in a 2–0 win against Luton Town on 17 October 2020. Fletcher struggled with injury problems in 2020–21 which prevented him from completing matches. Fletcher scored nine goals in 42 appearances as Stoke finished in 14th position. In the 2021–22 season Fletcher was mainly used as a substitute by Michael O'Neill. Fletcher made 40 appearances, scoring three goals which came in back to back games against Blackpool and Cardiff City. Fletcher was released by Stoke at the end of the season.

=== Dundee United ===
Fletcher signed for Dundee United on a two-year contract in July 2022. After scoring 10 goals in 39 games, Fletcher would leave the club by mutual consent on 27 June 2023 following United's relegation to the Scottish Championship.

=== Wrexham ===
Fletcher signed for Wrexham on 8 September 2023. On his 400th EFL appearance on 1 January 2024, he got his first Wrexham and EFL hat-trick, in a 4–1 win against Barrow. He signed a one-year extension with the club on 18 June 2024. He scored 8 goals in 33 games that season in League Two, and 8 goals in 42 games the following season in League One. Both seasons saw the team finish in second place for automatic promotion. During his second season at Wrexham, he was called a "supersub", scoring 5 goals in only 500 minutes on the pitch.

He was released following promotion at the end of the 2024–25 season.

On 29 September 2025, he announced his retirement from football.

== International career ==
Fletcher was eligible to represent either England, his birthplace and the nation of his father, or Scotland, his mother's home country and his place of residence since the age of 10. Fletcher was the top scorer in the Scotland under-19 team which reached the final of the 2006 under-19 European Championship, losing to Spain. Following the achievements of the under-19 side, Fletcher was named by The Scotsman newspaper as one of the "ten to watch" in Scottish sport during 2007. Fletcher made his debut for Scotland under-21s in the 2004–05 season.

Fletcher was named in the Scotland squad for the first time in March 2008, for a friendly match against Croatia. Fletcher started the game and provided the assist for Kenny Miller to score the equalising goal in a 1–1 draw. He was substituted at half-time due to injury. He was dropped back to the under-21 team in September 2008, but was immediately recalled to the full squad after scoring twice against Slovenia under-21s. Fletcher scored his first full international goal in a 2–1 win against Iceland on 1 April 2009.

After being left out of Euro 2012 qualification matches against Czech Republic and Spain, Fletcher publicly criticised head coach Craig Levein. Fletcher was then left out of the next Scotland squad, although Levein claimed that this was because Fletcher had not been playing regularly for his club side. When Levein attempted to select him for the squad in February 2011, Fletcher sent a text message stating that he did not want to join the squad. The dispute continued through the remainder of 2011, as Levein insisted that Fletcher would have to contact him first if he wanted to return to the squad. His club manager, Mick McCarthy, said in November 2011 that Fletcher wanted to play for Scotland and that the situation should be resolved.

Near the end of the 2011–12 season, Levein advised the Scottish media that he would not pick Fletcher again. Following Fletcher's £12 million move to Sunderland in August 2012, Levein re-iterated that Fletcher would not feature for Scotland again whilst he was manager. Levein also criticised the transfer fee paid by Sunderland as "quite obscene" and claimed that Fletcher had made no effort to rejoin the national squad. The dispute came into further focus after Fletcher performed well for Sunderland and Scotland only scored once in their first two 2014 FIFA World Cup qualification matches. Fletcher stated on his Twitter account that he would be willing to play for Scotland. His agent claimed that Fletcher had made an attempt to reconcile with Levein in September 2011, but nobody had provided details of how they could meet. On 2 October 2012, Fletcher was recalled to the Scotland squad for their World Cup qualifiers with Wales and Belgium.

Fletcher scored a hat-trick for Scotland in a 6–1 European qualifier victory over Gibraltar at Hampden Park on 29 March 2015, becoming the first player to score three in a match for the country since Colin Stein scored four against Cyprus in 1969. On 11 October, away to the same opposition with both teams already eliminated, he scored another treble in a 6–0 victory. He became the fifth player to score more than one hat-trick for Scotland, with the others being RS McColl (3), Robert Hamilton (2), Hughie Gallacher (3) and Denis Law (3).

== Personal life ==
In May 2016, Fletcher was fined for not disclosing that his wife was the driver when his car was caught speeding on the A66 in Appleby-in-Westmorland. Carlisle magistrates fined him £1,000, in addition to £620 costs and a £100 surcharge, and six points on his driving licence.

== Career statistics ==
=== Club ===
As of end of 2024–25 season

Appearances and goals by club, season and competition
Season	Club	League			National cup (Note: Includes Scottish Cup, FA Cup, Coupe de France)		League cup (Note: Includes Scottish League Cup, Football League Cup/EFL Cup)		Other		Total	
Season	Club	Division	Apps	Goals	Apps	Goals	Apps	Goals	Apps	Goals	Apps	Goals
Hibernian	2003–04	Scottish Premier League	5	0	0	0	0	0	—		5	0
Hibernian	2004–05	Scottish Premier League	20	5	4	0	2	0	—		26	5
Hibernian	2005–06	Scottish Premier League	34	8	4	2	2	0	1 (Note: Appearances in UEFA Cup)	0	40	10
Hibernian	2006–07	Scottish Premier League	31	6	5	1	5	4	3 (Note: Appearances in UEFA Intertoto Cup)	1	44	12
Hibernian	2007–08	Scottish Premier League	32	13	2	0	1	1	—		35	14
Hibernian	2008–09	Scottish Premier League	34	11	1	0	1	0	2	0	38	11
Hibernian	Total		156	43	16	3	11	5	6	1	189	52
Burnley	2009–10	Premier League	35	8	1	1	2	3	—		38	12
Wolverhampton Wanderers	2010–11	Premier League	29	10	3	1	2	1	—		34	12
Wolverhampton Wanderers	2011–12	Premier League	32	12	2	0	0	0	—		34	12
Wolverhampton Wanderers	Total		61	22	5	1	2	1	0	0	68	24
Sunderland	2012–13	Premier League	28	11	1	0	2	0	—		31	11
Sunderland	2013–14	Premier League	20	3	1	0	4	0	—		25	3
Sunderland	2014–15	Premier League	30	5	4	0	0	0	—		34	5
Sunderland	2015–16	Premier League	16	4	1	0	1	0	—		18	4
Sunderland	Total		94	23	7	0	7	0	0	0	108	23
Marseille (loan)	2015–16	Ligue 1	12	2	1	1	0	0	—		13	3
Sheffield Wednesday	2016–17	Championship	38	10	1	0	0	0	2 (Note: Appearances in EFL Championship play-offs)	1	41	11
Sheffield Wednesday	2017–18	Championship	19	2	0	0	1	1	—		20	3
Sheffield Wednesday	2018–19	Championship	40	11	3	0	2	0	—		45	11
Sheffield Wednesday	2019–20	Championship	27	13	2	0	1	0	—		30	13
Sheffield Wednesday	Total		124	36	6	0	4	1	2	1	136	38
Stoke City	2020–21	Championship	37	9	0	0	5	0	—		42	9
Stoke City	2021–22	Championship	35	3	2	0	3	0	—		40	3
Stoke City	Total		72	12	2	0	8	0	0	0	82	12
Dundee United	2022–23	Scottish Premiership	33	9	2	0	2	1	2 (Note: Appearances in UEFA Europa Conference League)	0	39	10
Wrexham	2023–24	League Two	33	8	1	0	0	0	0	0	34	8
Wrexham	2024–25	League One	40	8	0	0	1	0	2 (Note: Appearances in EFL Trophy)	0	43	8
Wrexham	Total		73	16	1	0	1	0	2	0	77	16
Career total			659	170	41	6	37	11	12	2	749	189

=== International ===
As of 20 November 2018

Appearances and goals by national team and year
National team	Year	Competitive		Friendly		Total	
National team	Year	Apps	Goals	Apps	Goals	Apps	Goals
Scotland	2008	1	0	1	0	2	0
Scotland	2009	3	1	2	0	5	1
Scotland	2010	0	0	1	0	1	0
Scotland	2012	2	0	0	0	2	0
Scotland	2013	1	0	2	0	3	0
Scotland	2014	4	0	1	0	5	0
Scotland	2015	6	7	1	0	7	7
Scotland	2016	2	1	3	0	5	1
Scotland	2017	1	0	0	0	1	0
Scotland	2018	2	1	0	0	2	1
Total		22	10	11	0	33	10

Scores and results list Scotland's goal tally first, score column indicates score after each Fletcher goal.

List of international goals scored by Steven Fletcher
No.	Date	Venue	Opponent	Score	Result	Competition
1	1 April 2009	Hampden Park, Glasgow, Scotland	Iceland	2–1	2–1	2010 FIFA World Cup qualification
2	29 March 2015	Hampden Park, Glasgow, Scotland	Gibraltar	2–1	6–1	UEFA Euro 2016 qualification
3	29 March 2015	Hampden Park, Glasgow, Scotland	Gibraltar	5–1	6–1	UEFA Euro 2016 qualification
4	29 March 2015	Hampden Park, Glasgow, Scotland	Gibraltar	6–1	6–1	UEFA Euro 2016 qualification
5	8 October 2015	Hampden Park, Glasgow, Scotland	Poland	2–1	2–2	UEFA Euro 2016 qualification
6	11 October 2015	Estádio Algarve, Faro, Portugal	Gibraltar	3–0	6–0	UEFA Euro 2016 qualification
7	11 October 2015	Estádio Algarve, Faro, Portugal	Gibraltar	4–0	6–0	UEFA Euro 2016 qualification
8	11 October 2015	Estádio Algarve, Faro, Portugal	Gibraltar	5–0	6–0	UEFA Euro 2016 qualification
9	4 September 2016	National Stadium, Ta' Qali, Malta	Malta	4–1	5–1	2018 FIFA World Cup qualification
10	17 November 2018	Loro Boriçi Stadium, Shkodër, Albania	Albania	2–0	4–0	2018–19 UEFA Nations League C

== Honours ==
Hibernian

- Scottish League Cup: 2006–07

Sunderland

- Football League Cup runner-up: 2013–14

Marseille

- Coupe de France runner-up: 2015–16

Wrexham

- EFL League Two runner-up: 2023–24
- EFL League One runner-up: 2024–25

Individual

- SFWA Young Player of the Year: 2007–08, 2008–09
- Scottish Premier League Young Player of the Month: October 2004, August 2007, February 2008, October 2008, March 2009
- Premier League Player of the Month: September 2012

== See also ==
- List of Scotland international footballers born outside Scotland
