= Len Benbow =

English footballer

Personal information
- Full name: Leonard Benbow
- Date of birth: 3 May 1876
- Place of birth: Oswestry, England
- Date of death: 1946 (aged 70)
- Position: Centre forward

Senior career*
Years	Team	Apps	(Gls)
1895–1896	Oswestry United		
1896–1897	Shrewsbury Town		
1897–1899	Nottingham Forest	54	(20)
1899–1900	Stoke	21	(2)
1901	Northampton Town		
Total		75	(22)
- * Club domestic league appearances and goals

Leonard Benbow (3 May 1876 – 1946) was an English footballer who played in the Football League for Nottingham Forest and Stoke.

Benbow played for Oswestry United and Shrewsbury Town before joining Nottingham Forest in 1897. He won the 1898 FA Cup with Forest and scored 22 goals for the club in 62 games. He spent the 1900–01 season at Stoke scored four goals in 24 matches and ended his career with Northampton Town.

== Career ==
Benbow was born in Oswestry and played for his local team Oswestry United and then nearby Shrewsbury Town. Benbow's performances in the Birmingham League for Shrewsbury earned him a move to Nottingham Forest in 1897. In his first season with Forest he enjoyed a large amount of success as he scored 13 goals and played in the 1898 FA Cup Final as Forest beat Derby County to lift the cup. In 1898–99 He scored eight goals in 27 matches and in 1899–1900 managed just one in six as he found himself out of favour.

He joined Stoke for the 1900–01 season and his signing was met with approval from the club's supporters. But he failed to live up to the hype and he managed just two goals in the league both coming against Newcastle United in January 1901. He was allowed to leave the club at the end of the season and Benbow went to Northampton Town.

== Career statistics ==
Appearances and goals by club, season and competition
Club	Season	League			FA Cup		Total	
Club	Season	Division	Apps	Goals	Apps	Goals	Apps	Goals
Nottingham Forest	1897–98	First Division	24	11	5	2	29	13
Nottingham Forest	1898–99	First Division	24	8	3	0	27	8
Nottingham Forest	1899–1900	First Division	6	1	0	0	6	1
Nottingham Forest	Total		54	20	8	2	62	22
Stoke	1900–01	First Division	21	2	3	2	24	4
Career Total			75	22	11	4	86	26

== Honours ==
Nottingham Forest

- FA Cup winner: 1898
