= Aston-on-Trent =

Village in Derbyshire, England

Coordinates: 52.86°N 1.385°W

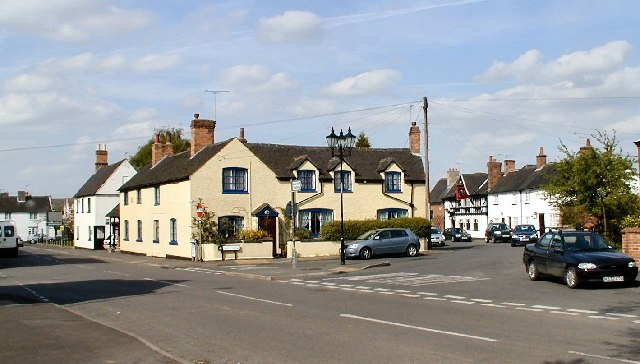

- Aston upon Trent Parish, (Note: The historical Civil Parish name is asserted to use the word 'upon', not on) highlighted within Derbyshire

- Location within Derbyshire
- Population: 1,682 (2011)
- OS grid reference: SK415295
- Civil parish: Aston upon Trent
- District: South Derbyshire
- Shire county: Derbyshire
- Region: East Midlands
- Country: England
- Sovereign state: United Kingdom
- Post town: DERBY
- Postcode district: DE72
- Dialling code: 01332
- Police: Derbyshire
- Fire: Derbyshire
- Ambulance: East Midlands
- UK Parliament: South Derbyshire

Aston-on-Trent is a village and civil parish in the South Derbyshire district, in the county of Derbyshire, England. The parish had a population of 1,682 at the 2011 Census. It is adjacent to Weston-on-Trent and near Chellaston, very close to the border with Leicestershire.

On the north bank of the River Trent, about a mile from the river on rising ground, it is out of its flood plain. The Trent and Mersey Canal runs between the village and the river.

All Saints’ Church is Celtic. There are two public houses, the White Hart and The Malt.

== History ==
In 1009 Æþelræd Unræd (King Ethelred the Unready) signed a charter at the Great Council which recognised the position and boundaries of Westune. The land described in that charter included the lands now known as Shardlow, Great Wilne, Church Wilne, Crich, Smalley, Morley, Weston and Aston on Trent. Under this charter Æþelræd gave his minister, Morcar, a number of rights that made him free from tax and enabled his own rule within the manor.

This manor came under the control of the King again following Morcar being murdered in 1015 and the lands were later given to Ælfgar, the Earl of Mercia, but he lost this at the Norman Conquest. Aston is in the Domesday Book where it is mentioned as an outlying farm of Weston-on-Trent and listed amongst the lands given to Henry de Ferrers by the King. The land given to Henry included 5 acres (20,000 m^{2}) of land that was valued at eight shillings.

The name is of Anglo-Saxon descent ('ton' an Old English suffix meaning farm). Being in the east, the name literally means 'East Farm'. The 'On-Trent' suffix of both Aston and nearby villages simply means they are near the river Trent.

Shardlow and Great Wilne were included in the parish of Aston-on-Trent until 1838, when Shardlow constructed its own church.

== Notable residents ==
- James Sutton (1799-1868), boatbuilder, canal boat carrier and owner of a salt works
- William Drury-Lowe (1802–1877), a landowner who inherited the Locko Park lands
- Edward Anthony Holden (1805–1877), a landowner who lived at Aston Hall
- William Darwin Fox (1805–1880), a clergyman and naturalist, born nearby.
- General Sir Drury-Lowe (1830–1908), a British Army officer

=== Sport ===
- Fred Forman (1873–1910), footballer, played 158 games for Nottingham Forest and 3 for England
- Frank Forman (1875–1961), footballer, played 223 games for Nottingham Forest and 9 for England
- Harry Linacre (1880–1957), football goalkeeper, played 308 games for Nottingham Forest and 2 for England

== Education ==
The village has its own primary school – Aston-on-Trent Primary School – and is in the catchment area of Chellaston School.

== Recreation ==
Football in Aston is over 100 years old and in that time the village has developed at least three players who went on to play for England. Aston-on-Trent was the birthplace of three men who all played football for England within a six-year spell. They were Harry Linacre (1880–1957), who was a goalkeeper for England and Nottingham Forest, and his uncles Fred and Frank Forman. Harry was picked for England twice in 1905 helping them to victory both times. All three men were also originally signed by Derby County and then sold on to Nottingham Forest.

Today Aston-on-Trent F.C. consists of both a Saturday side playing in the Midlands Regional Alliance, and a Sunday side playing in the Derby Taverners League. 2013/14 saw the Sunday side win the cup double, building on many years' work to climb through the various divisions of the Long Eaton leagues, where they also won the Premier League and cup double.

== See also ==
- Listed buildings in Aston-on-Trent
- Charles Paget
- Edward Anthony Holden
