= 1898 FA Cup final =

British association football match

1898 FA Cup Final
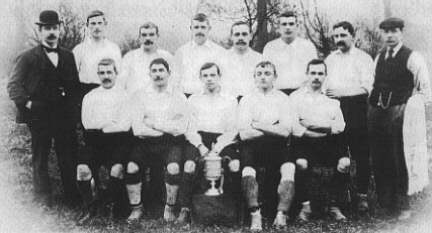
- Nottingham Forest posing with the trophy
- Event: 1897–98 FA Cup
Nottingham Forest	Derby County
3	1
- Date: 16 April 1898
- Venue: Crystal Palace, London
- Referee: John Lewis (Market Drayton, Shropshire)
- Attendance: 62,017

The 1898 FA Cup final was an association football match between Derby County and Nottingham Forest on Saturday, 16 April 1898 at the Crystal Palace stadium in south London. It was the final match of the 1897–98 FA Cup, the 27th edition of the world's oldest football knockout competition, and England's primary cup competition, the Football Association Challenge Cup, better known as the FA Cup.

Derby County and Nottingham Forest were both appearing in their first final. As members of the Football League First Division, they were exempt from the competition's qualifying phase and each joined the competition in the first round proper, progressing through four rounds to the final.

The final was watched by a crowd of 62,017 and Forest, leading 2–1 at half-time, won the match 3–1 with goals by Arthur Capes (2) and John McPherson. Steve Bloomer scored for Derby. Forest won the cup again in 1959. Derby reached the final again in 1899 but were defeated by Sheffield United; they won the cup in 1946.

== Background ==
The FA Cup, known officially as The Football Association Challenge Cup, is an annual knockout association football competition in men's domestic English football. The competition was first proposed on 20 July 1871 by C. W. Alcock at a meeting of The Football Association committee. The tournament was first played in the 1871–72 season and is the world's oldest association football competition. The 1898 match between Derby County and Nottingham Forest at Crystal Palace was the 27th final. Both teams were appearing in the final for the first time.

Derby County and Nottingham Forest were both members of the Football League First Division. In the 1897–98 league championship, Forest amassed 31 points to finish in eighth place, eleven points behind champions Sheffield United. Derby finished in tenth place, three points behind Forest.

Both teams were selected by a committee with the club secretary in charge on match days. Derby's secretary was Harry Newbould who, in 1900, became their first formally appointed team manager. Nottingham Forest retained the policy of selection by committee until 1936. In 1898, their secretary was Harry Hallam.

== Route to the final ==
=== Derby County ===
Round	Opposition	Score
First	Aston Villa (h)	1–0
Second	Wolverhampton Wanderers (a)	1–0
Third	Liverpool (h)	1–1
Third (replay)	Liverpool (a)	5–1
Semi-final	Everton (n)	3–1
Key: (h) = home venue; (a) = away venue; (n) = neutral venue. Source:

Derby County entered the competition in the first round proper and played five matches, including one replay, en route to the final. All four of their opponents were other teams in the First Division.

==== Early rounds ====
In the first round on Saturday, 29 January, Derby were at home to Aston Villa

==== Semi-final ====
The semi-finals were staged at neutral venues on Saturday, 19 March. Derby faced Liverpool's Merseyside neighbours Everton at Molineux, where Derby had won their second round tie in February.

=== Nottingham Forest ===
Round	Opposition	Score
First	Grimsby Town (h)	4–0
Second	Gainsborough Trinity (h)	4–0
Third	West Bromwich Albion (a)	3–2
Semi-final	Southampton (n)	1–1
Semi-final (replay)	Southampton (n)	2–0
Key: (h) = home venue; (a) = away venue; (n) = neutral venue. Source:

Nottingham Forest entered the competition in the first round proper and played five matches, including one replay, en route to the final. One of their opponents was in the First Division, two were in the Second Division and one was in the Southern League.

==== Early rounds ====
In the first round on Saturday, 29 January, Forest were at home to Second Division Grimsby Town.

==== Semi-final ====
The semi-finals were staged at neutral venues on Saturday, 19 March, and Forest were drawn to play Southern League champions Southampton at Bramall Lane in Sheffield.

== Match ==
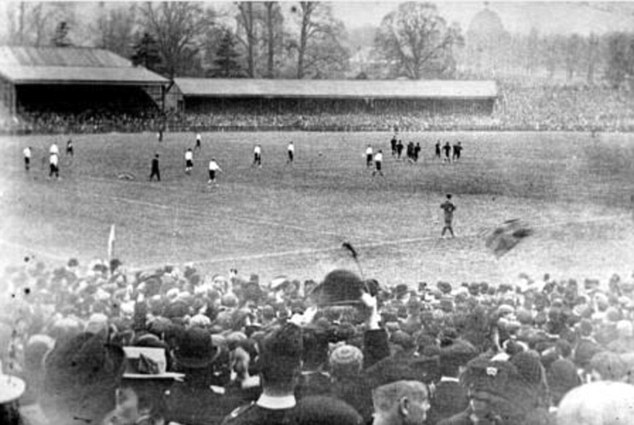
A moment of the final

Forest took the lead with a goal by Capes which Bloomer equalised. After 42 minutes, Richards tried to lob from a McInnes cross. Fryer was reached it first but he dropped the ball at the feet of Capes, who turned it into the empty goal.

In the second half, McPherson scored Forest's third goal four minutes from time.

=== Details ===
16 April 1898
15:30 GMT

Derby County	1–3	Nottingham Forest
Bloomer 31'		Capes 19' 42'; McPherson 86'

Crystal Palace, London
Attendance: 62,017
Referee: John Lewis (Market Drayton)

Derby County	Nottingham Forest

GK	(England) Jack Fryer
RB	(Scotland) Jimmy Methven
LB	(Scotland) Joe Leiper
RH	(England) John D. Cox
CH	(Ireland) Archie Goodall
LH	(England) Jimmy Turner
RW	(England) John Goodall
IR	(England) Steve Bloomer
CF	(Scotland) John Boag
IL	(Scotland) Jimmy Stevenson
LW	(Scotland) Hugh McQueen
Club secretary:
(England) Harry Newbould

GK	(England) Dan Allsopp
RB	(Scotland) Archie Ritchie
LB	(Scotland) Adam Scott
RH	(England) Frank Forman (c)
CH	(Scotland) John McPherson
LH	(England) Willie Wragg
RW	(Scotland) Tom McInnes
IR	(England) Charlie Richards
CF	(England) Len Benbow
IL	(England) Arthur Capes
LW	(England) Alf Spouncer
Club secretary:
(England) Harry Hallam

Match rules

- 90 minutes duration (two halves of 45 minutes each; teams change ends at half-time). (Note: The duration of a football match has been 90 minutes since an agreement in 1866 for the match between London and Sheffield.)
- No extra time if scores level at end of normal time. (Note: The FA introduced the option of extra time into its rules in 1897.) Result to be settled by replay at a later date. (Note: The 1875 final was the first in which a replay took place; this method of deciding the winners continued until 1999. The 2005 final was the first to be settled by penalty shoot-out.)
- No substitutes allowed. (Note: Although there were isolated instances of substitution in earlier times, it was not until the beginning of the 1965–66 season that substitutes were first allowed in English top-class matches, and then only for replacement of injured players.)

Notes

- Players are listed above according to their positions on the field. There was no shirt numbering in 1898. (Note: The first known instance of shirt numbering in English football was in March 1914. It was not until the 1939–40 season that a numbering system was formally introduced.)

== Post-match ==
Presentation details and post-match events to follow

== Bibliography ==
- Collett, Mike (2003). The Complete Record of the FA Cup. Cheltenham: SportsBooks Ltd. ISBN 978-18-99807-19-2.
