= Scott Adams (disambiguation) =

Scott Adams (1957–2026) was an American author and creator of the Dilbert comic strip.

Scott Adams may also refer to:

- Scott Adams (game designer) (born 1952), American game designer
- Scott Adams (skier) (born 1971), Australian Paralympic skier
- Scott Adams (American football) (1966–2013), American football player

== See also ==
- Peggy Scott-Adams (1948–2023), American R&B and soul singer
- Adam Scott (disambiguation)
- Adams (surname)
