= Harry Hallam (football manager) =

English football manager

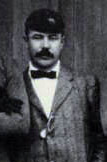

Personal information
- Full name: Harry Hallam

Managerial career
- Years: Team
- 1897-1909: Nottingham Forest

Harry Hallam was a football manager who managed Nottingham Forest between 1897 and 1909. He was the manager when Forest won the FA Cup in 1898 and for their successful tour of Argentina and Uruguay in 1905. Hallam managed Nottingham Forest for 462 games which is the third highest, behind Brian Clough (968) and Billy Walker (650).
