= John McPherson (footballer, born 1863) =

Scottish footballer

- With Nottingham Forest in 1894

Personal information
- Date of birth: 1 March 1863
- Place of birth: Motherwell, Scotland
- Date of death: 2 April 1957 (aged 94)
- Place of death: Victoria, British Columbia, Canada
- Height: 5 ft 8 in (1.73 m)
- Position: Centre half

Senior career*
Years	Team	Apps	(Gls)
1888–1891	Heart of Midlothian (Note: Low total of league stats – the Scottish Football League began in the 1890–91 season.)	9	(5)
1891–1901	Nottingham Forest (Note: Includes stats for the Football Alliance for 1891–92.)	245	(29)
1892	→ Heart of Midlothian (loan)	4	(1)
1901–1902	Motherwell	3	(0)

International career
1890–1891	Scotland	2	(0)
- * Club domestic league appearances and goals

John McPherson (1 March 1863 – 2 April 1957) was a Scottish footballer who played as a centre half for Heart of Midlothian and Nottingham Forest.

== Early life ==
McPherson was born in Motherwell in 1863, and was originally named Peter; he was listed with that name in the 1871 census, but this must have been changed within the next three years, as the 1881 census shows him under the name John along with a younger brother named Peter who was born in 1874.

== Career ==
McPherson played in Scotland for Heart of Midlothian from July 1888 to June 1891, winning the Scottish Cup with the Edinburgh club in 1891. He moved south of the border to play for Nottingham Forest, but was briefly loaned back to Hearts from May to August 1892. He then returned to Nottingham Forest where he played for the best part of a decade, becoming club captain. He also won the FA Cup with Forest in 1898, scoring in the final in a 3–1 win over rivals Derby County. He returned to Scotland to complete his career with his hometown club Motherwell in the 1901–02 season.

He made his debut for Scotland in 1890, in a game where his appearance was wrongly attributed for many years to his namesake, and played once more in 1891. (Note: In the Scottish Football Association's website profile, McPherson's record also includes the statistics for John McPherson (footballer, born 1868) who gained 8 caps / 6 goals between 1888 and 1897.)

== Later life ==
He moved to Canada in 1910 and settled in Regina, Saskatchewan working for the City of Regina. In 1950 he moved to Victoria, British Columbia where he died in 1957.

== Honours ==
Heart of Midlothian

- Scottish Cup: 1890–91

Nottingham Forest

- FA Cup: 1897–98
