= Peter McCracken (footballer, born 1869) =

Scottish footballer (1869–1948)

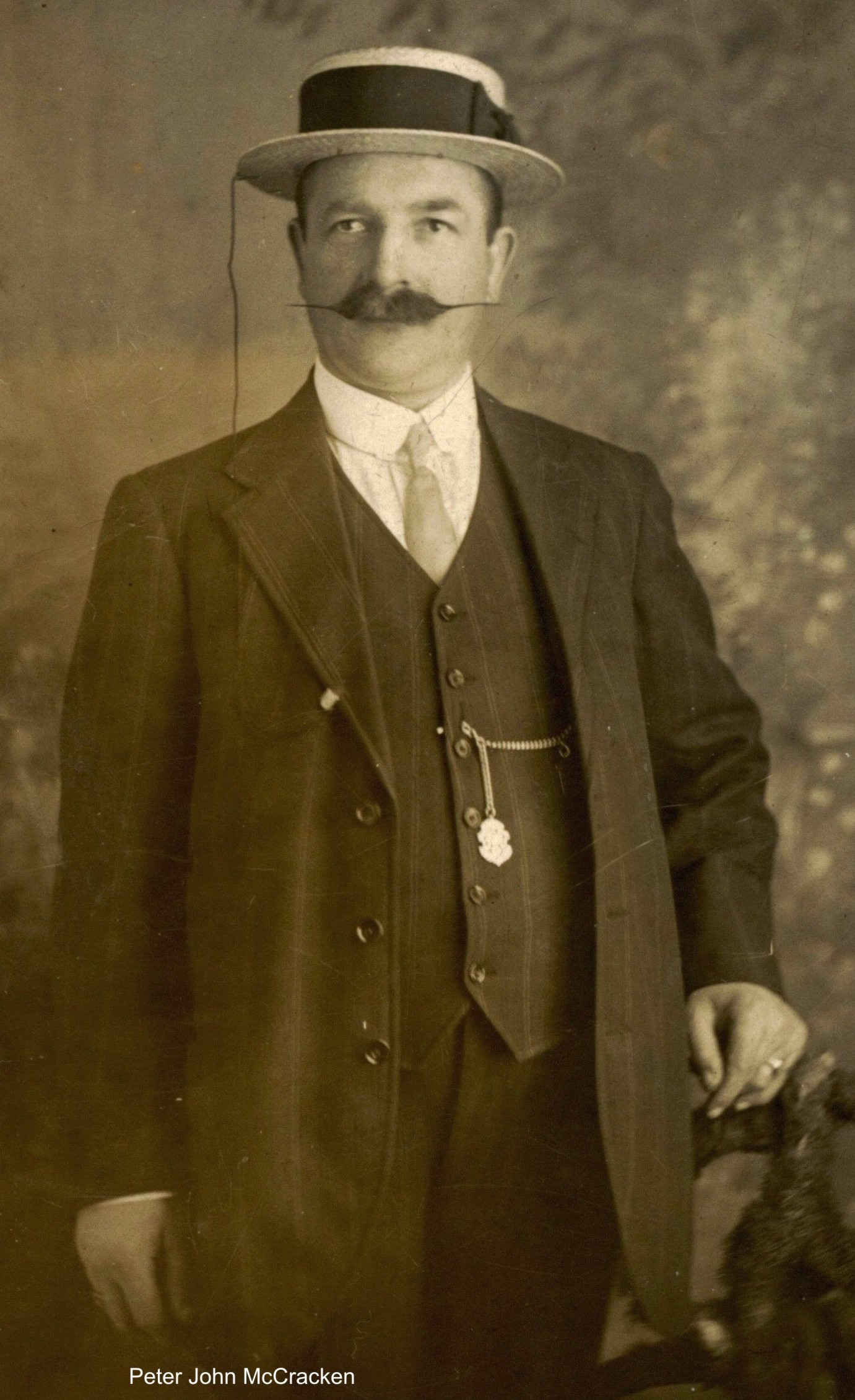
- Peter McCracken in the early 1900s, pre WWI

Personal information
- Full name: Peter John McCracken
- Date of birth: 14 October 1869
- Place of birth: Penninghame, Scotland
- Date of death: 1948 (aged 75–76)
- Position: Half back

Senior career*
Years	Team	Apps	(Gls)
1885–1886	Springburn		
1886–1890	Third Lanark		
1890–1892	Sunderland Albion		
1892–1899	Nottingham Forest	113	(0)
1899–1900	Middlesbrough	33	(0)
1900–1902	Chesterfield Town	52	(1)
Total		198	(1)

International career
1891	Football Alliance XI	1	(0)
- * Club domestic league appearances and goals

Peter John McCracken (14 October 1869 – 1948) was a Scottish footballer who played in the Football League for Chesterfield Town, Middlesbrough and Nottingham Forest.
