= Charlie Craig (footballer) =

Scottish footballer

Personal information
- Full name: Charles Thomson Craig
- Date of birth: 11 July 1874
- Place of birth: Dundee, Scotland
- Date of death: 11 January 1933 (aged 58)
- Place of death: West Bridgford, England
- Height: 6 ft 1 in (1.85 m)
- Position: Full-back

Senior career*
Years	Team	Apps	(Gls)
–1893	Dundee Our Boys		
1893–1894	Dundee	0	(0)
1894–?	Dundee Wanderers		
1895–1899	Dundee	8	(4)
- Silvertown
1899–1900	Thames Ironworks	17	(0)
1900–1902	West Ham United	53	(0)
1902–1907	Nottingham Forest	136	(2)
1907–1908	Bradford Park Avenue	6	(0)
1908–1910	Norwich City		
1910–1911	Southend United	23	
1911–1914	Merthyr Town		
- * Club domestic league appearances and goals

Charles Thomson Craig (11 July 1874 – 11 January 1933) was a Scottish professional footballer who played as a full-back. He played for both Dundee and West Ham United during their inaugural seasons, and later played in the Football League for Nottingham Forest and Bradford Park Avenue.

== Career ==
Craig was born in Dundee and played locally for Dundee Our Boys, where he was part of the team that reached the Dundee Charity Cup Final in 1892–93, before they merged with Dundee East End to form Dundee F.C. He played for the new club for a season, making 13 appearances including in friendlies, before moving to Dundee Wanderers, where he made eight appearances. He then returned to Dundee for another four seasons but only rarely featured for the first team, before moving to the East End of London, first joining Silvertown, then Southern League First Division club Thames Ironworks, where he played in the club's final season before they were wound up and reformed as West Ham United.

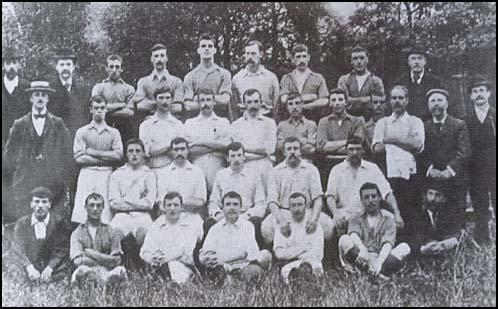
Thames Ironworks in 1899. Craig shown back row, fifth from left

Craig made his debut for the Ironworks in an FA Cup third qualifying round match against Dartford on 28 October 1899. During his initial season with the club, he made 18 Southern League appearances, including an end-of-season test match against Fulham, as well as six appearances in the Thames & Medway Combination and four in the FA Cup. He had played in a number of positions over the course of the season before he settled as a left-back. In that position, he formed a partnership with future Hammers manager Syd King. Craig played in West Ham's first ever match, against Gravesend United on 1 September 1900, which ended in a 7–0 victory for the new club. He remained at the club for two seasons, making 60 appearances in league and cup.

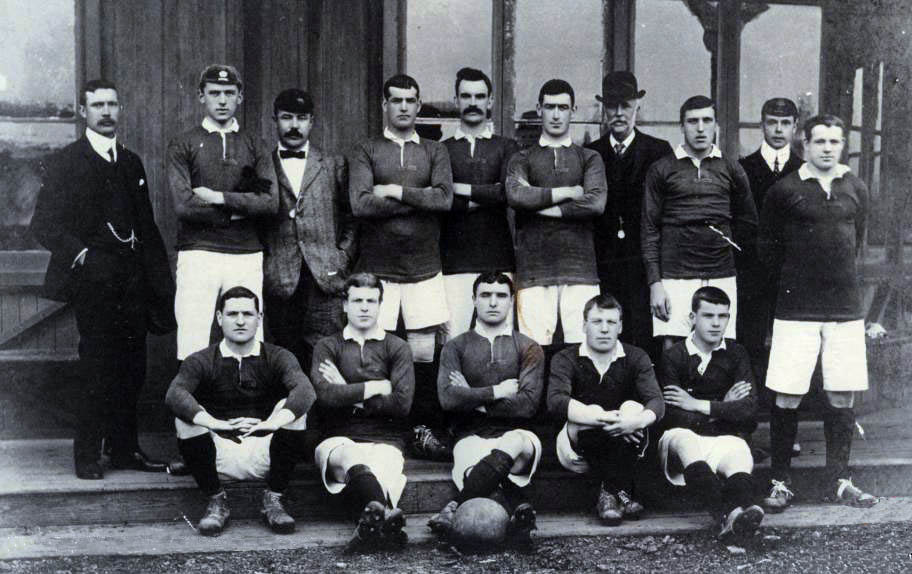
Nottingham Forest during their tour of Argentina and Uruguay. Craig shown back row, fifth from left

He moved on to Football League First Division club Nottingham Forest in 1902, where he spent periods partnering both James Iremonger and Walter Dudley, and played in both full-back positions. Towards the end of his first season with the club, he came into consideration for the Scotland national team when he appeared in the Home Scots v Anglo-Scots annual trial match (he had also taken part in a trial 12 years earlier in his amateur days with Dundee Our Boys). In 1905, he travelled with Forest on their tour of Argentina and Uruguay. In all, he spent five seasons and made 136 League appearances at Forest.

He then returned to the Southern League with Bradford Park Avenue in 1907–08 and was part of the team that were elected to the Football League for the following season. He made only six appearances that season, however, before joining Southern League Norwich City.

Craig spent the next two seasons at Norwich, then moved on to Southend United for the 1910–11 season. He then joined Welsh club Merthyr Town, who were at that time competing in the Southern League Second Division and was part of the team that achieved promotion to the First Division in 1911–12. He played for the club for a further two seasons before retiring from football in April 1914. Craig had made over 400 appearances for his various clubs.

== Style of play ==
Craig, who was 13 stone (180 lb; 83 kg) and 6 ft 1 in (1.85 m), had been described as a "genial, good natured giant" by a contemporary journalist, and also as "one of the most scrupulously fair players it would be possible to find".

== Outside football ==
When Craig moved to London, he worked as a mechanic at the Tate & Lyle sugar refinery in Silvertown. He lived in Tate Road, opposite the refinery. He then found work as a marine engine fitter at the Thames Ironworks and Shipbuilding Company and played for the company's works team.

He also had some success as an athlete, winning medals in track events.

During World War I, Craig served with the mechanical section of the Royal Army Service Corps. He was stationed at Bulwell Hall, as were a number of other local sportsmen. Following his demobilisation, he ran a billiard hall in the centre of Nottingham.

In later life, Craig lived in West Bridgford in Nottinghamshire. He died in his home, aged 58, on 11 January 1933. He had been ill for several months and his death was described as "not unexpected". He left a widow, a son and a daughter.
