= Tommy Morren =

English footballer

Personal information
- Full name: Thomas Morren
- Date of birth: 27 March 1871
- Place of birth: Sunderland, England
- Date of death: 29 January 1929 (aged 57)
- Height: 5 ft 4 1/4 in (1.63 m)
- Position: Centre half

Senior career*
Years	Team	Apps	(Gls)
- Middlesbrough Victoria
- Middlesbrough Vulcan
- Middlesbrough Ironopolis
- Middlesbrough
- Barnsley St Peters
1896–1904	Sheffield United		

International career
1898	England	1	(1)
- * Club domestic league appearances and goals

Thomas Morren (27 March 1871 – 29 January 1929) was an English international footballer, who played as a centre half.

== Early life ==
Morren was born in Sunderland, the second of fifth children. His father was Irish. Like his father he worked as an ironfounder.

== Career ==
Morren played for Middlesbrough Victoria, Middlesbrough Vulcan, Middlesbrough Ironopolis, Middlesbrough, Barnsley St Peters and Sheffield United.

His solitary cap for England came in 1898, where he scored in the British Home Championship match against Ireland.

== Later life ==
Morren had three children and worked as a newsagent and tobacconist in Sheffield. He joined the Royal Air Force in 1918.
