= Adam Scott (footballer) =

Scottish footballer (1871–??)

Personal information
- Full name: Adam Scott
- Date of birth: 1871
- Place of birth: Coatbridge, Scotland
- Position: Full back

Senior career*
Years	Team	Apps	(Gls)
1888–1890	Albion Rovers		
1890–1900	Nottingham Forest (Note: Includes stats for Football Alliance in 1890–91 and 1891–92.)	218	(3)
- * Club domestic league appearances and goals

Adam Scott (1871–unknown) was a Scottish footballer who played in the Football League for Nottingham Forest.

== Career ==
Scott was born in Coatbridge and began his football career with hometown club Albion Rovers in 1888 and joined Nottingham Forest in the early 1890s. He was part of their team that won the 1891–92 Football Alliance, and was a near ever-present in their inaugural League season, making his Football League debut in Forest's first ever match at Everton in the First Division in September 1892. He was an ever present in his second and third seasons at the club, and the highlight of his career came when he won the 1898 FA Cup with Forest, as they beat local rivals Derby County 3–1 in the final at The Crystal Palace.

However he lost his place in the first half of 1898–99, and whilst he returned in December to play in most of Forest's remaining fixtures that season, he made only one further appearance in 1899–1900, playing his last game of 201 in total (scoring 4 goals in the process) against Bury in November 1899. Whether through injury or another reason, he retired from the game and his movements after leaving The City Ground are uncertain.

== Career statistics ==
Appearances and goals by club, season and competition
Club	Season	League			FA Cup		Total	
Club	Season	Division	Apps	Goals	Apps	Goals	Apps	Goals
Nottingham Forest	1892–93	First Division	28	1	2	0	30	1
Nottingham Forest	1893–94	First Division	30	1	4	0	34	1
Nottingham Forest	1894–95	First Division	30	2	3	0	33	2
Nottingham Forest	1895–96	First Division	26	0	1	0	27	0
Nottingham Forest	1896–97	First Division	20	0	3	0	20	0
Nottingham Forest	1897–98	First Division	25	0	6	0	31	0
Nottingham Forest	1898–99	First Division	19	0	3	0	22	0
Nottingham Forest	1899–1900	First Division	1	0	0	0	1	0
Career total			179	4	22	0	201	4

== Honours ==
Nottingham Forest

- FA Cup winner: 1898
