= Walter Dudley (footballer) =

English footballer

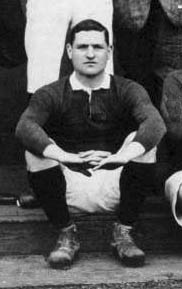
- Dudley with the Nottingham Forest team that toured Argentina and Uruguay in 1905

Personal information
- Full name: Walter William Dudley
- Date of birth: Q2 1882
- Place of birth: Rotherham, England
- Height: 5 ft 8 in (1.73 m)
- Position: Full-back

Senior career*
Years	Team	Apps	(Gls)
1900–1914	Nottingham Forest	278	(0)
- Mansfield Mechanics
- Doncaster Rovers
- * Club domestic league appearances and goals

Walter William Dudley MM was an English professional footballer who played as a full-back in the Football League for Nottingham Forest.

Born in Rotherham and living in Lenton, Dudley spent 14 years at Nottingham Forest, first joining the club in 1900. He played in both full-back positions, often partnering Charlie Craig. In 1905, he travelled with Forest on their tour of Argentina and Uruguay. He made 299 competitive appearances for the club, including 278 Football League appearances between 1902 and 1914, and also played in 13 friendly matches.

After leaving Forest in 1914, Dudley played the following season at Mansfield Mechanics and Doncaster Rovers.

During World War I, Dudley served with the Royal Garrison Artillery, seeing action at Vimy Ridge, Messines, Ypres and Passchendaele. He was awarded the Military Medal in 1918.
