= Robert Smyth McColl =

Scottish footballer

Robert McColl
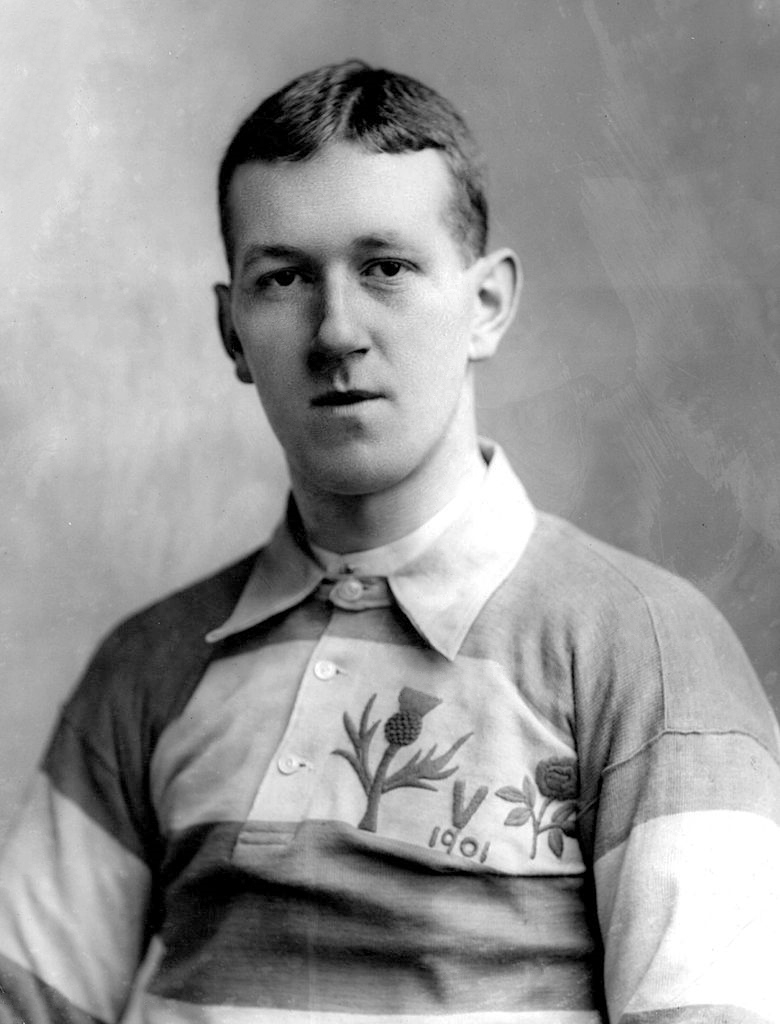
- McColl, circa 1901

Personal information
- Full name: Robert Smyth McColl
- Date of birth: 13 April 1876
- Place of birth: St Rollox Glasgow, Scotland
- Date of death: 25 November 1959 (aged 83)
- Place of death: Newton Mearns, Scotland
- Positions: Centre forward; inside left

Youth career
- 1892–1894: Benmore

Senior career*
Years	Team	Apps	(Gls)
1894–1901	Queen's Park	19	(10)
1901–1904	Newcastle United	64	(18)
1904–1907	Rangers	27	(13)
1907–1912	Queen's Park	57	(30)

International career
1896–1908	Scotland	13	(13)
1901	Scottish League XI	1	(1)
- * Club domestic league appearances and goals

Robert Smyth McColl (13 April 1876 – 25 November 1959) was a Scottish footballer who played as a centre forward.

== Playing career ==
McColl started his career with junior club Benmore in 1892 and moved to Queen's Park in 1894. He represented the Scottish League in 1901. He later played professionally in England for Newcastle United, remaining on Tyneside for three years until he came back to Glasgow in 1904 to play for Rangers. He returned to Queen's Park in 1907, although the restoration of his amateur status had to be decided by the board of the club beforehand. McColl finished his football career in 1912, scoring 6 goals in his penultimate game against Port Glasgow Athletic, a Scottish scoring record which stands to the present day.

McColl played 13 games and scored 13 goals for the Scotland national football team and he was inducted into the Scottish Football Hall of Fame in November 2011. He is the only player to have scored a hat-trick against each of the other home nations.

== Personal life ==
McColl is now better known for lending his name to the newsagent chain RS McColl, which he set up in 1901 with his brother Tom; due to this, he became known as Toffee Bob. He served as a sergeant in the Royal Army Service Corps during the First World War.

== Death ==
McColl died in 1959, aged 83. He is buried in Cathcart Cemetery in southern Glasgow.

== Career statistics ==
=== International ===
Appearances and goals by national team and year
National team	Year	Apps	Goals
Scotland	1896	2	2
Scotland	1897	1	1
Scotland	1898	1	1
Scotland	1899	3	6
Scotland	1900	2	3
Scotland	1901	2	0
Scotland	1902	1	0
Scotland	1903	0	0
Scotland	1904	0	0
Scotland	1905	0	0
Scotland	1906	0	0
Scotland	1907	0	0
Scotland	1908	1	0
Total		13	13

Scores and results list Scotland's goal tally first, score column indicates score after each McColl goal.

List of international goals scored by Smyth McColl
No.	Date	Venue	Opponent	Score	Result	Competition	Ref.
1.	28 March 1896	Solitude Ground, Belfast	Ireland	1–0	3–3	1895–96 British Home Championship	
2.	28 March 1896	Solitude Ground, Belfast	Ireland	2–1	3–3	1895–96 British Home Championship	
3.	27 March 1897	Ibrox Park, Glasgow	Ireland	3–0	5–1	1896–97 British Home Championship	
4.	26 March 1988	Solitude Ground, Belfast	Ireland	2–0	3–0	1897–98 British Home Championship	
5.	18 March 1899	Racecourse Ground, Wrexham	Wales	2–0	6–0	1898–99 British Home Championship	
6.	18 March 1899	Racecourse Ground, Wrexham	Wales	5–0	6–0	1898–99 British Home Championship	
7.	18 March 1899	Racecourse Ground, Wrexham	Wales	6–0	6–0	1898–99 British Home Championship	
8.	25 March 1899	Celtic Park, Glasgow	Ireland	1–0	9–1	1898–99 British Home Championship	
9.	25 March 1899	Celtic Park, Glasgow	Ireland	4–0	9–1	1898–99 British Home Championship	
10.	25 March 1899	Celtic Park, Glasgow	Ireland	6–0	9–1	1898–99 British Home Championship	
11.	7 April 1900	Celtic Park, Glasgow	England	1–0	4–1	1899–1900 British Home Championship	
12.	7 April 1900	Celtic Park, Glasgow	England	3–0	4–1	1899–1900 British Home Championship	
13.	7 April 1900	Celtic Park, Glasgow	England	4–1	4–1	1899–1900 British Home Championship	

== Honours ==
Queen's Park

- Sheriff of London Charity Shield: 1899 (shared)
- Glasgow Cup: 1898–99

Scotland

- Home Championship: 1896, 1897, 1900, 1902, 1908 (shared)

== See also ==
- List of Scotland national football team hat-tricks
