= Willie Wragg =

English footballer

Personal information
- Full name: William Arthur Wragg
- Date of birth: 1875
- Place of birth: Radford, England
- Date of death: Unknown
- Positions: Wing half; full back

Senior career*
Years	Team	Apps	(Gls)
- Notts Olympic
- Sutton-in-Ashfield
- Newstead Byron
–	Hucknall Portland		
1896–1899	Nottingham Forest	48	(1)
1899–1901	Leicester Fosse	50	(4)
1901	Small Heath	1	(0)
1901–1902	Watford		
1902–1903	Hinckley Town		
1903–1904	Chesterfield Town	20	(0)
- Accrington Stanley
- Doncaster Rovers
1905–1906	Brighton & Hove Albion	4	(0)
- * Club domestic league appearances and goals

William Arthur Wragg (1875 – after 1904) was an English professional footballer who made 119 appearances in the Football League playing for Nottingham Forest, Leicester Fosse, Small Heath and Chesterfield Town.

Wragg was born in Radford, Nottinghamshire.

== Nottingham Forest ==
He played local football before joining Nottingham Forest in April 1896. Wragg made his debut on 28 November 1896 at home against Liverpool. In the early part of his career he played at wing half, and from this position he created Forest's first goal in the 1898 FA Cup Final. From his free kick from the left near the by-line, the ball came to Arthur Capes who shot through a crowd of defenders. Wragg later aggravated a first-half injury and had to move out to the wing, unable to take much further part in the game. He made 58 appearances in all competitions for Forest. He scored his only goal for Nottingham Forest on 2 October 1897 in the 1–1 draw at home against Sunderland.

== Leicester Fosse ==
After three years he joined Leicester Fosse, where he spent two seasons, made 50 appearances in the Second Division playing at full back, and became the club's free kick specialist.

== Later career ==
A move to Small Heath brought him just the one first-team appearance because of the form of George Adey. In August 1901 he joined Southern League club Watford, and a year later moved to Hinckley Town of the Midland League. He returned to the Football League to play 20 Second Division games for Chesterfield Town, and then went back to non-league football with Accrington Stanley, Doncaster Rovers and Brighton & Hove Albion.

== Post Football ==
Wragg appeared on stage with Stan Laurel and Charlie Chaplin.

== Career statistics ==
Appearances and goals by club, season and competition
Club	Season	League			FA Cup		Total	
Club	Season	Division	Apps	Goals	Apps	Goals	Apps	Goals
Nottingham Forest	1896-97	First Division	12	0	4	0	16	0
Nottingham Forest	1897-98	First Division	24	1	6	0	30	1
Nottingham Forest	1898-99	First Division	12	0	0	0	12	0
Nottingham Forest	Total		48	1	10	0	58	1
Leicester Fosse'	1898-99	Second Division	4	0	0	0	4	0
Leicester Fosse'	1899–1900	Second Division	34	5	1	0	35	1
Leicester Fosse'	1900-01	Second Division	11	0	0	0	11	0
Leicester Fosse'	Total		50	5	1	0	51	5
Small Heath	1900-01	Second Division	1	0	0	0	1	0
Small Heath	Total		1	0	0	0	1	0
Chesterfield Town	1903-04	Second Division	20	0				
Chesterfield Town	Total		20	0				
Career total			119	5				

== Honours ==
Nottingham Forest

- FA Cup winner: 1898
