= Adam Sherriff Scott =

Canadian painter and muralist (1887–1980)

Adam Sherriff Scott RCA
- Born: July 18, 1887; Scotland
- Died: October 23, 1980 (aged 103); Sainte-Anne-de-Belleville, PQ
- Education: Edinburgh School of Art (1904-1906), Slade School (1910) with Henry Tonks as well as study at the National Gallery of Art, London and the Tate Gallery, London
- Known for: painter, portrait painter, muralist
- Spouse: Anne Margaret Lauder (m. 1913)

Adam Sherriff Scott RCA (July 18, 1887 – October 23, 1980) was a Canadian painter, often of portraits and historical or genre scenes, and a muralist. As a result of his ability to depict vivid historical scenes after considerable research in books, he received commissions for portraits, posters, murals and paintings that were reproduced in history books and calendars. Among these were paintings for calendar illustrations of Canadian historical scenes for the Hudson's Bay Company Calendars. These paintings were auctioned in 2025 at a special sale caused by the closing of the company.

== Career ==
Scott was born in Scotland (Note: Scott's birthplace is sometimes given as Perth, Scotland, sometimes as Galashiels. His Artist's Information Form in the National Gallery of Canada, Ottawa, which he filled out, says Perth.) He studied as a teenager at the Edinburgh School of Art in London, England (1904-1906), then was awarded a four-year scholarship to continue his studies at the Patrick Allen Fraser School of Art in Scotland (1907-1908) with George Harcourt, a preparatory school for young painters. Afterwards, he returned to London where he studied at the Slade School of Art (1910) with Henry Tonks and privately at the National Gallery of Art and Tate Gallery in London, England. He emigrated to Brandon, Manitoba in Western Canada in 1912, then moved to Calgary, found work there, then settled for life with his wife in Montreal in 1915.

During the First World War, he enlisted in the Canadian Expeditionary Force as a private and received a commission in 1917 with the 42nd Royal Highlanders of Canada. He was wounded in 1918. The portraits and other subjects he created for war posters are in the collection of the Canadian War Museum.

Upon returning to Montreal in 1919, he resumed his career, then in 1921 joined the Beaver Hall Group. In the 1920s, he travelled to the Canadian Far North and the Arctic and remained there for several years painting Inuit life. In 1938, he established the Adam Sherriff Scott School of Fine Art in Montreal, where he taught drawing and painting, emphasizing sound draftsmanship.

Scott was elected to full membership in the Royal Canadian Academy of Arts in 1942. He exhibited his work from 1927 to 1954 with the Royal Canadian Academy of Arts, the Spring Exhibitions of the Art Association of Montreal and in a solo exhibition at Watson Art Galleries (1937) and other galleries.

Later in Scott's life, from 1966 to 1969, he had Armand Tatossian as a student.

His Fonds, the Adam Sherriff Scott collection, is in Library and Archives Canada.

== Selected public collections ==
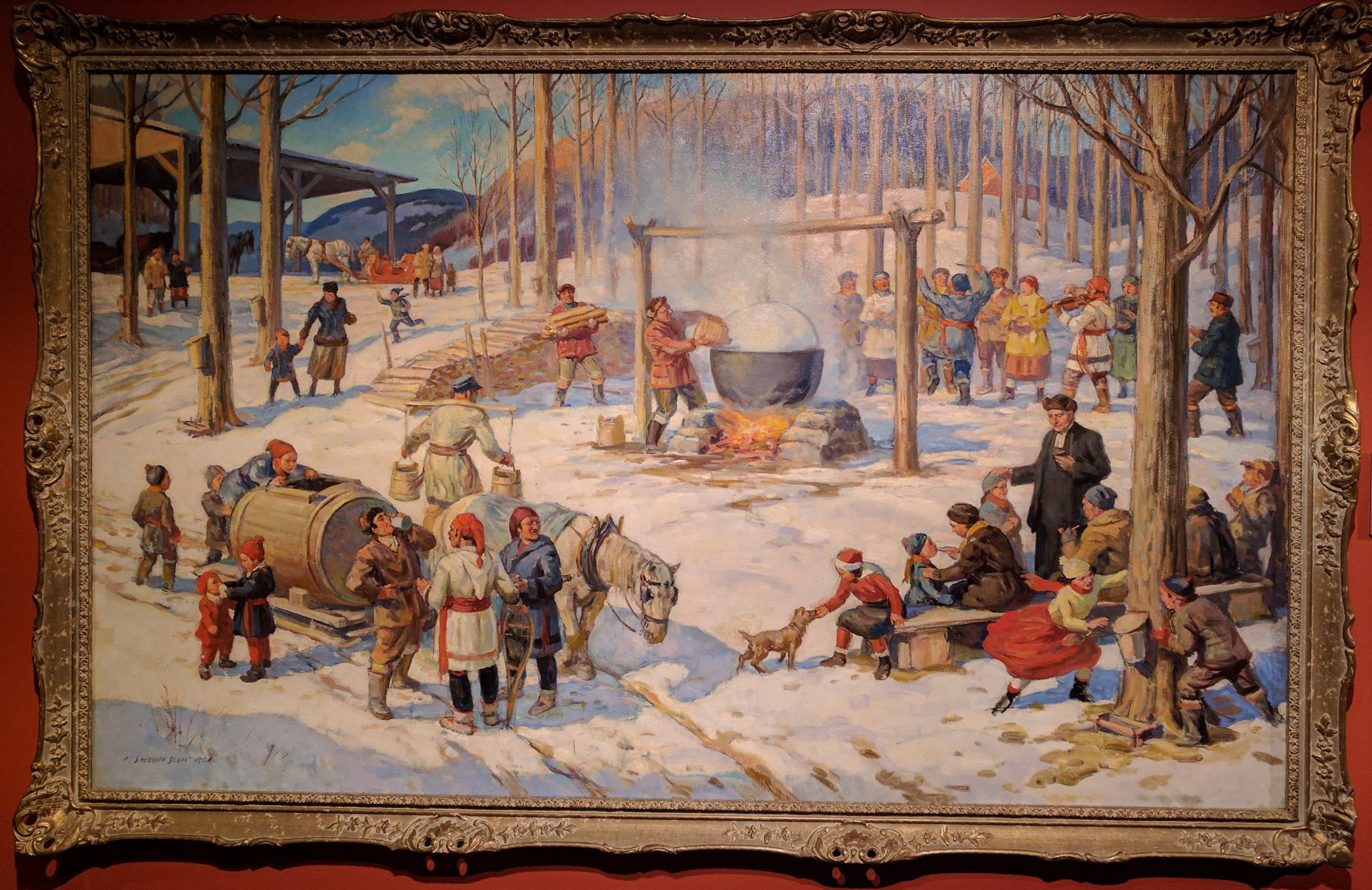
Old Time Sugaring Party by Adam Sherriff Scott, Art Gallery of Nova Scotia

Scott's work is in the National Gallery of Canada, the Musée national des beaux-arts du Québec, the Montreal Museum of Fine Arts, the Art Gallery of Nova Scotia, the Canadian War Museum, and other institutions.

== Murals ==
Scott painted many murals for companies and clubs such as two in 1927, one for the Hudson's Bay Company Store at Portage Avenue Branch titled The Pioneer at Fort Garry, 1861 (now in the Manitoba Museum) and a second one, the Building of St. Charles (Manitoba Provincial Archives), both in Winnipeg. He also painted murals for Montreal and Quebec institutions such as the Masonic Temple of Montreal, a National Historic Site of Canada, the Richelieu Manor (now the Fairmont Richelieu Manor) in La Malbaie (1927) and Chateau Montebello (1930) in Montebello as well as the Canadian Steamship Lines (1937).

== Record sale prices ==
At the Heffel Auction "A Legacy Through Art: The Hudson's Bay Company Collection", five paintings for Hudson's Bay Company calendars by Scott were sold for well above their estimates.

The painting which sold for the highest price was lot 003, Scott's Chief Trader Archibald McDonald Descending the Fraser, 1828, oil on canvas, 32 x 26 in, 81.3 x 66 cm, Estimate: $7,000 - $9,000 CAD, which sold for: $361,250 (including Buyer's Premium). Another painting by Scott, Trading Ceremony at York Factory, 1780s, oil on canvas, circa 1954, 32 x 28 in, 81.3 x 71.1 cm, Estimate: $6,000 - $8,000 CAD, sold for: $97,250. Although the catalogue cautioned in an essay on Trading Ceremony, its "valorization of British iconography and idealized view of the trade relationship", the price realized suggests that buyers liked the work.

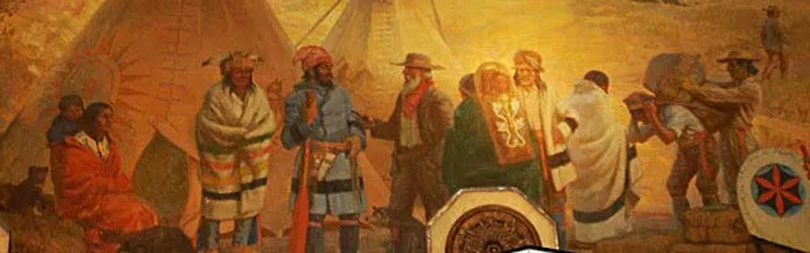
“Pioneer at Fort Garry 1861” – oil on canvas by Adam Sherriff Scott assisted by E.T. Adney, May 1927
