= Tom McInnes (footballer, born 1873) =

Scottish footballer (1873–1937)

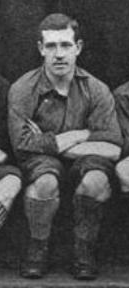
- With Nottingham Forest in 1894

Personal information
- Full name: Thomas Fair MacAulay McInnes
- Date of birth: 8 July 1873
- Place of birth: Bowling, Scotland
- Date of death: 1 December 1937 (aged 64)
- Place of death: Dalmuir, Scotland
- Position: Inside forward

Senior career*
Years	Team	Apps	(Gls)
–	Newcastle East End		
- Newcastle West End
1891–1892	Clyde	22	(6)
1892–1899	Nottingham Forest	167	(48)
1899–1900	Bristol Rovers	19	(9)
1900–1903	Lincoln City	79	(20)
1904–1905	Port Glasgow Athletic	1	(0)

International career
1892	Scottish League XI	1	(2)
- * Club domestic league appearances and goals

Thomas Fair MacAulay McInnes (8 July 1873 – 1 December 1937) was a Scottish professional footballer.

McInnes scored 68 goals from 246 appearances in the Football League playing as a forward for Nottingham Forest and Lincoln City. McInnes played for Clyde and Port Glasgow Athletic in the Scottish Football League, and for Bristol Rovers in the Southern Football League.

== Life and career ==
McInnes moved to Newcastle upon Tyne aged 16, mainly to find work as a rivetter. He played for local clubs East End and West End before returning home for a season with Clyde, newly admitted to the Scottish League. At its end, he played for the Scottish League XI against the rival Scottish Football Alliance, scoring twice.

In 1892, McInnes joined Nottingham Forest, newly elected to the First Division of the Football League as champions of the Football Alliance. He played in their first league match, on 3 September 1892 against Everton. He was part of the Forest team that won the 1898 FA Cup Final, defeating favourites Derby County 3–1. According to The Times, Forest "playing a remarkably fine game, went near to outclassing Derby County" in "an upset of public form". McInnes remained with Forest for seven seasons in all, scoring 58 goals from 185 appearances in the League and FA Cup. During his time with Forest, McInnes attracted the attention of the Scotland national football team selectors. He played in the international trial matches of 1897 and 1898 for the 'Anglo-Scots' team (Scottish players based in England), but did not earn selection for the full Scotland team.

McInnes left Forest in 1899, spending the 1899–1900 season in the Southern League with Bristol Rovers. He may have spent a brief period during this season with Third Lanark, though without appearing in the Scottish League. McInnes moved back to England to sign for Lincoln City in September 1900. He spent three seasons with the club in the Football League Second Division, and was their leading scorer in the 1901–02 season, with 14 goals in all competitions. He made one more appearance in League football, for Port Glasgow Athletic in the 1904–05 season.

He died in December 1937 at the age of 64.

== Honours ==
Nottingham Forest

- FA Cup winners: 1898
