= Alf Spouncer =

English footballer and manager

Personal information
- Date of birth: 1 July 1877
- Place of birth: Gainsborough, England
- Date of death: 31 August 1962 (aged 85)
- Place of death: Southend, England
- Position: Outside left

Senior career*
Years	Team	Apps	(Gls)
1893–1894	Gainsborough Trinity		
1895–1897	Sheffield United		
1897–1910	Nottingham Forest		

International career
1900	England	1	(0)

Managerial career
- 1923–1924: Barcelona
- * Club domestic league appearances and goals

William Alfred Spouncer (1 July 1877 – 31 August 1962) was an English footballer, who played as an outside left.

== Career ==
Born in Gainsborough, Spouncer first played for hometown club Gainsborough Trinity during the 1893–94 season. He joined Sheffield United in October 1895, where he would stay until May 1897, when he signed professionally for Nottingham Forest. He won the FA Cup in 1898 and the Division Two title in 1907. After leaving Forest in 1910, and failing to find a new club, he retired the following year.

Internationally, he earned one cap for England in 1900, against Wales.

Spouncer had a brief foray into management with Barcelona, taking charge of the Catalans during the 1923–24 season. He won the Campionat de Catalunya with ten wins out of ten, but in the Copa del Rey, his Barcelona side were soundly beaten 6–1 in the semi-final replay against the eventual winners, Real Unión.

== Honours ==
Nottingham Forest

- FA Cup winner: 1898
