= Joe Leiper =

Scottish footballer

Personal information
- Full name: Joseph Leiper
- Date of birth: 15 March 1873
- Place of birth: Govan, Scotland
- Date of death: 3 February 1937 (aged 64)
- Place of death: Hillhead, Glasgow
- Position: Full-back

Senior career*
Years	Team	Apps	(Gls)
1890–1891	Minerva		
1891–1892	Partick Thistle		
1892–1900	Derby County	157	(0)
1900–1902	Grimsby Town	46	(0)
1902–1903	Chesterfield Town	25	(0)
1903	Partick Thistle		
1903–1904	Motherwell		
1904	Hull City		
1904–1905	Aberdare Town		
1905–190?	Belper Town		
- * Club domestic league appearances and goals

Joseph Leiper (15 March 1873 – 3 February 1937) was a Scottish professional footballer who played as a full-back.

He was the son of Joseph Leiper Sr., a wine merchant, and Ellen Barr. He married Martha Harrison and they had three sons and three daughters. He worked as a ship plater's helper. He died of heart failure in Glasgow, aged 64.
