= Charlie Richards =

English footballer (1875–1911)

Personal information
- Full name: Charles Henry Richards
- Date of birth: 9 August 1875
- Place of birth: Burton upon Trent, Staffordshire, England
- Date of death: 27 April 1911 (aged 35)
- Position: Inside right

Senior career*
Years	Team	Apps	(Gls)
- Gresley Rovers
?–1894	Newstead Byron		
1894–1896	Notts County		
1896–1898	Nottingham Forest	74	(20)
1898–1901	Grimsby Town	80	(42)
1901–1902	Leicester Fosse	25	(5)
1902–1903	Manchester United	8	(1)
1903	Doncaster Rovers	7	(0)

International career
1898	England	1	(0)
- * Club domestic league appearances and goals

Charles Henry Richards (9 August 1875 – 27 April 1911) was an English professional footballer who played as a forward for Notts County, Nottingham Forest, Grimsby Town, Leicester City, Manchester United and Doncaster Rovers.

Born in Burton upon Trent, Staffordshire, England, Richards began his career as an inside right with Derbyshire side Gresley Rovers. He then played for Newstead Byron for a time, before moving on to Notts County in July 1894. However, Richards transferred to Notts County's city rivals, Nottingham Forest, only 18 months later, where he played for a total of three seasons. He made 74 league appearances for Forest, scoring 20 goals.

In December 1898, Richards transferred to Grimsby Town, where he made 80 league appearances and scored 42 goals, including three penalties. In his final season with Grimsby, Richards and the rest of the team won promotion to the First Division by finishing top of the Second Division. He was then picked up by Leicester Fosse in June 1901. In his one season at Leicester, Richards made a total of 25 appearances, and scored five goals.

In August 1902, Richards signed for Manchester United, who had recently been rescued from financial difficulties by a generous benefactor, and renamed from Newton Heath FC. The club was languishing in the Second Division at the time, and was just beginning to get back on its feet. Richards played for United for just one season, scoring just one goal in eight league appearances. He finally moved to Doncaster Rovers in March 1903, where he would play till the end of the season before going into retirement.

Richards won his only England cap on 5 March 1898, in a 3–2 victory over Ireland in the Home Championship.

Richards died on 27 April 1911, at the age of 35.

== Honours ==
Nottingham Forest

- FA Cup: 1898

== Sources ==
- Bostock, Adam; Pilger, Sam; Butler, Cliff; Mitten, Andy; Meek, David; Taylor, Frank OBE; Barnes, Justyn; Tyrell, Tom; Ferguson, Jim (2001) [1998]. The Official Manchester United Illustrated Encyclopedia (3rd ed.). London: Manchester United Books. ISBN 0-233-99964-7.
