= Jimmy Settle =

English footballer

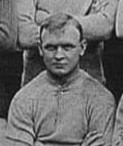

Personal information
- Full name: James Settle
- Date of birth: 5 September 1875
- Place of birth: Millom, Cumberland, England
- Date of death: 1 June 1954 (aged 78)
- Place of death: Horwich, Lancashire, England
- Position: Inside forward

Senior career*
Years	Team	Apps	(Gls)
1894–1895	Bolton Wanderers	13	(4)
1895–1896	Halliwell Rovers		
1896–1899	Bury	63	(28)
1899–1908	Everton	237	(84)
1908–1909	Stockport County	26	(2)
Total		339	(118)

International career
1899–1903	England	6	(6)
- * Club domestic league appearances and goals

James Settle (5 September 1875 – 1 June 1954) was an English professional footballer. A fast-paced inside or outside right, he could have chosen sprinting if he had not taken up football.

Settle played for Bolton Wanderers and Bury before joining Everton for a fee of £400 in 1899, with whom he won the FA Cup in 1906. Settle was the Football League First Division's leading goalscorer for the 1901–02 season with 18 goals, the lowest of the highest totals achieved in the English top-flight to date. In 1908 Settle was sold to Stockport County, his final club before retiring from football.

Settle represented England 6 times between 1899 and 1903, playing in the British Home Championship against the other Home Nations, scoring 6 times, including a hat-trick against Ireland in February 1899. Settle scored England's only goal in the match against Scotland in April 1902 which was expunged from the records and replayed as a result of the Ibrox disaster which occurred during the game. Settle's goal in this match is not included in his international record.
