= G. O. Smith =

English footballer and cricketer

Gilbert Oswald Smith
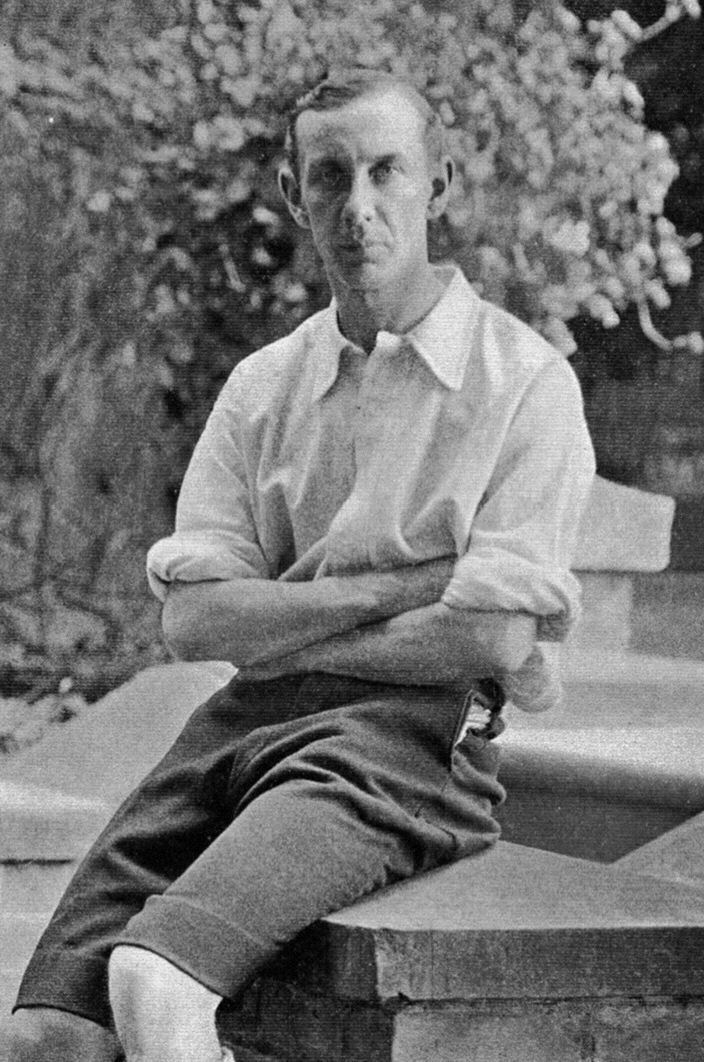

Personal information
- Full name: Gilbert Oswald Smith
- Date of birth: 15 November 1872
- Place of birth: Croydon, Surrey, England
- Date of death: 6 December 1943 (aged 71)
- Place of death: Lymington, Hampshire, England
- Position: Forward

Senior career*
Years	Team	Apps	(Gls)
1892–1903	Corinthians	137	(132)
	Casuals	29	(42)
Total		166	(174)

International career
1893–1901	England	20	(11)
- * Club domestic league appearances and goals

Gilbert Oswald Smith (25 November 1872 – 6 December 1943), familiarly known as G. O. Smith or simply as G. O. or Jo, was an English amateur footballer often referred to as "the first great centre forward". In addition, Smith played first-class cricket for Oxford University and Surrey.

Smith was by profession a schoolmaster, becoming headmaster of Ludgrove School, jointly with footballing colleague William Oakley from 1901 until 1934. He was unmarried.

== Early life ==
Born in Croydon but the son of a Scottish merchant who settled in India, in his early life Smith lived in Godalming at a house called Killcott which later became St Hilary's School.

He was educated, from 1886 to 1892, at Charterhouse School, one of the principal nurseries of the Association Football game, where he learned many of the skills that subsequently brought him fame. He went on to study at Keble College, Oxford, and played football for Oxford University, representing the team from his first year, winning three out of four Varsity matches played against Cambridge, and captaining Oxford in his final year.

== Club career ==
On leaving Oxford, Smith joined the Corinthians, then the best-known amateur football club in Britain and Ireland, one renowned for its promotion of the ideals of sportsmanship and fair play, but also fully capable of meeting the best professional teams of the day on equal terms. Smith's scoring record for the club – 132 goals in 137 matches – remains one of the best strike rates in the history of the game, equating to one goal for every 93 minutes played. From 1898 to 1902 Smith would also serve (jointly with William Oakley) as the Secretary of Corinthians. His record for the Casuals was even more impressive, with 42 goals in 29 appearances.

In the course of his club career, Smith captained Corinthians in the first Sheriff of London Charity Shield fixture, a competition created to match the best professional and amateur teams in Britain. The match, played in 1898 against Sheffield United, proved controversial and with the score standing at 1–1 after 90 minutes, the professional side declined to play extra time because they had disagreed with several of the referee's decisions. Smith also scored the winning goal in Corinthians' memorable 2–1 Charity Shield win against the professionals of Aston Villa played at Crystal Palace in November 1900.

== International career ==
Smith captained the England team on at least 13, and possibly as many as 16, occasions (early records are inexact) between 1896 and 1901, winning at least eight games, possibly as many as ten, and drawing two.

His most productive game in an England shirt came in February 1899, when he netted three times in only five minutes and four times in all during the 13–2 demolition of Ireland.

"Fine fellows they were," the great Welsh player Billy Meredith wrote of the Smith-led, all-amateur England forward line of 1895,

some six feet three in their socks and carrying plenty of weight with their inches. And they were not afraid to use their weight either, as some of us discovered. All in true sporting fashion, of course, for they were just as ready to take as to give hard knocks. Every man of them could run like a deer and before the game was over most of us were crying bellows to mend. Most of them were Corinthian stars and they played the Corinthian game. 'Twas a grand sight to see their forward line sweeping down the field, though probably our backs didn't think so.

He made a total of 20 appearances for England (scoring 11 goals), between 1893 and 1901. Some authorities, including the author of the article on Smith published in the Dictionary of National Biography, credit him with 21 caps, one of which was won in the unofficial 12–0 victory over Germany in 1901.

== Playing style ==
G.O. Smith was known for his balance and timing, and for his close control of the ball.

Unlike the majority of centre-forwards of the day, Smith also excelled at passing. His obituary in The Times said he was "a maker rather than a scorer of goals", and football writer Jonathan Wilson described him as "what we would now term a false nine".

Steve Bloomer, Smith's professional colleague in several international matches, remarked that it was for this reason that he would rather play alongside Smith than any other centre-forward. The Dictionary of National Biography says that he "transformed the role of the centre-forward from that of an individual striker into a unifier of the forward line, indeed the whole team."

Though Smith was tall for the era, at nearly 5 feet 11 inches (1.80 m), he suffered from asthma and lacked the brawn that had characterised predecessors in the England team such as W.N. "Nuts" Cobbold in a period in which body-checking and other rough tactics were considered fair play. He was noted for his reluctance to head the ball, stating that he would be happy to see the practice banned. Smith made up for these deficiencies by positioning himself intelligently and by shooting accurately, and – so his obituary observed – "invariably low".

== Reputation ==
By the time of his retirement, Smith was perhaps the most admired figure in the English game, familiarly known to several generations of schoolboys simply by his initials at a time when only one other sportsman – the cricketer W.G. Grace – was so recognised. Despite the emergence of later, equally capable centre forwards in a more recognisably modern mould – most notably Vivian Woodward, Smith's successor in the England team – his abilities were recalled and praised well into the 1940s. The International Federation of Football History & Statistics, a scholarly group based in Wiesbaden, describes him as "the most brilliant, indeed perfect, footballer in the world around the turn of the century".

"G.O." was, according to contemporaries, unusually popular among professional footballers who were generally wary of the leading amateurs. Sir Frederick Wall, the long-serving Secretary of the Football Association wrote that he was "a man without petty pride". Wall recalled that Steve Bloomer "had an intense admiration" for his England striking partner, and Bloomer himself remarked that, unlike the majority of amateurs of the day, Smith was invariably courteous to his professional teammates and social inferiors: "He was the finest type of amateur, one who would always shake hands with us professionals in a manner which said plainly he was pleased to meet them."

== Cricket career ==
G. O. Smith
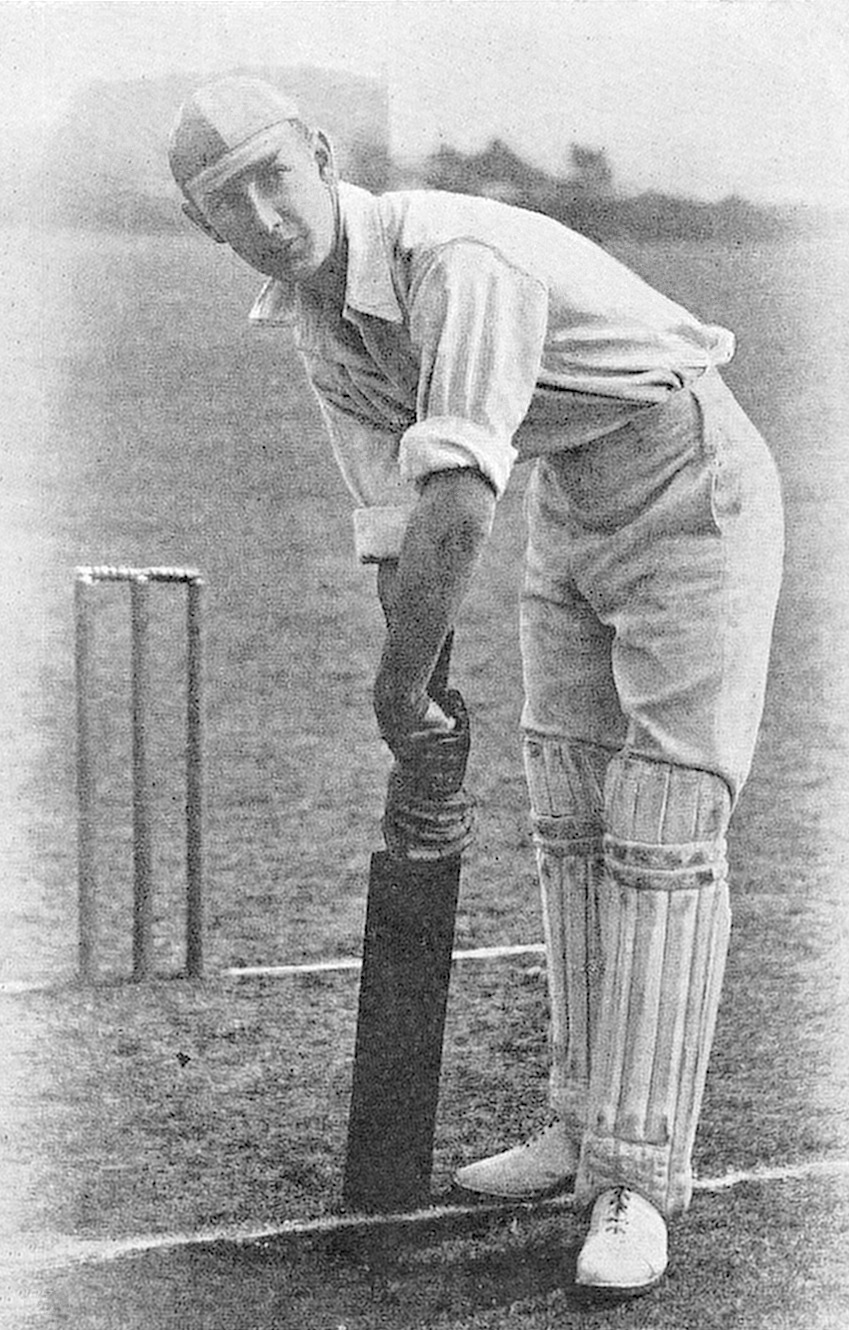

Personal information
- Born: 25 November 1872; Croydon, Surrey, England
- Died: 6 December 1943 (aged 71); Lymington, Hampshire, England
- Batting: Right-handed
- Bowling: Right-arm fast medium

Domestic team information
- Years: Team
- 1893–1896: Oxford University
- 1896: Surrey

Career statistics
Competition	First-class
Matches	17
Runs scored	778
Batting average	29.32
100s/50s	1/4
Top score	132
Catches/stumpings	11/–
- Source: CricketArchive, 24 October 2012

In his youth, G.O. Smith was also a noted cricketer, representing Oxford University and scoring a match-winning 132 runs in the fourth innings of the 1896 Varsity Match to win the game against Cambridge. He batted right-handed. showing excellent timing with his drives and cutting beautifully, bowled reasonably well, and fielded at cover point. In the field he moved – his obituary in Wisden noted – "gracefully with quickness in all he did."

== See also ==
- List of English cricket and football players

== Bibliography ==
- William Gibson and Alfred Pickford (1906). Association Football and the Men Who Made It. London: Caxton.
- John Harding (1998). Football Wizard: The Billy Meredith Story. London: Robson Books.
- Norman Jacobs (2005). Vivian Woodward: Football's Gentleman. Stroud: Tempus Publishing.
