= List of Sheffield Wednesday F.C. players =

This is a list of footballers who have played for Sheffield Wednesday F.C. in competitive fixtures, up to and including games played by 26 December 2024. Number of appearances and goal statistics are for all competitions.

For current players see Current squad. Their names in this list will be marked in bold text.

Name	Nationality	Sheffield Wednesday career	Appearances	Goals	Position
Steve Adams	England	2005–2007	21	0	Midfielder
Chris Adamson	England	2005–2007	12	0	Goalkeeper
Benik Afobe	England	2014	13	2	Forward
Gabriel Agbonlahor	England	2005	8	0	Forward
Junior Agogo	Ghana	1996–2000	3	0	Forward
Niclas Alexandersson	Sweden	1997–2000	88	12	Midfielder
Hasney Aljofree	England	2004	3	0	Defender
Bill Allan	England	1891–1897	116	0	Goalkeeper
Jack Allen	England	1927–1931	114	85	Forward
Viv Anderson	England	1991–1993	96	13	Defender
Wayne Andrews	England	2006–2007	9	1	Forward
Harry Anstiss	England	1926–1927	12	5	Forward
G Anthony	England	1874–1883	5	3	Forward
Michail Antonio	Jamaica	2012-2014	84	18	Midfielder
Zigor Aranalde	Spain	2005	2	0	Defender
Harry Armitage	England	1920–1922	3	0	Defender
Len Armitage	England	1914–1920	3	0	Defender
Craig Armstrong	England	2002–2005	40	1	Midfielder
Harry Armstrong	England	1907–1909	6	0	Midfielder
James Armstrong	England	1921	7	0	Forward
Jack Ashley	England	1935–1939	117	3	
Peter Atherton	England	1994–2000	251	9	Defender
Dalian Atkinson	England	1989–1990	45	15	Forward
Walter Aveyard	England	1938-1947	10	5	Forward
George Ayres	England	1924–1926	26	11	Forward
Ian Bailey	England	1982–1983	45	0	Defender
Walter Baird	England	1934	1	0	
Peter Baker	England	1957–1958	12	0	Defender
Jack Ball	England	1930–1933	135	94	Defender
John Ballagher	England	1958–1959	3	0	
**Barry Bannan**	Scotland	2015–2026	477	37	Midfielder
Gary Bannister	England	1981–1984	143	66	Forward
Keith Bannister	England	1946–1952	78	0	
George Bargh	England	1935–1936	5	0	
Ross Barkley	England	2012 (loan)	13	4	Midfielder
Matt Barrass	England	1925–1926	49	14	
Earl Barrett	England	1998–2000	15	0	Defender
Graham Barrett	Republic of Ireland	2005	6	1	Forward
Dean Barrick	England	1989–1990	11	2	Defender
George Barron	England	1903	1	0	Midfielder
Brian Barry-Murphy	Republic of Ireland	2003–2004	58	0	Midfielder
Chris Bart-Williams	England	1991–1995	124	16	Defender/Midfielder
Bill Bartlett	England	1904–1910	200	3	
Danny Batth	England	2011–2012 (loan)	49	2	Defender
A. Beckett	England	1887	1	0	
Lewis Bedford	England	1925	11	2	Forward
George Beech	England	1897–1904	22	6	
George Beeson	England	1929–1934	75	0	
Mark Beevers	England	2007–2012	161	4	Defender
Derek Bell	England	1976	5	1	Forward
Lawrence Bell	Scotland	1895–1897	54	13	
Jack Bellas	England	1920–1923	51	0	
Dave Bennett	England	1989–1990	29	0	
Julian Bennett	England	2011–2013	29	2	Defender
Mickey Bennett	England	1890−1891	4	3	Midfielder
Harry Bentley	England	1914–1920	52	3	
Marlon Beresford	England	2001	4	0	Goalkeeper
Leon Best	England	2005, 2006, 2014 (all on loan)	16	5	Forward
Jon Beswetherick	England	2002–2004	11	0	Defender
Billy Betts	England	1883–1885	80	4	Defender
Walter Bingley	England	1955–1958	38	0	Defender
Sid Binks	England	1922–1924	82	33	Midfielder
Chas Binney	England	1919–1922	43	6	
Arnold Birch	England	1919–1923	29	0	Goalkeeper
Graham Birks	England	1962	4	0	Defender
Mikkel Bischoff	Denmark	2006	4	0	Defender
Ray Blackhall	England	1978–1982	140	1	
Andy Blair	Scotland	1984–1986	58	3	Midfielder
Jimmy Blair	Scotland	1914–1920	61	0	Defender
Con Blatsis	Australia	2000–2001	6	0	Defender
Ernest Blenkinsop	England	1923–1934	424	5	Defender
Regi Blinker	Netherlands	1996–1997	42	3	Midfielder
Patrick Blondeau	France	1997–1998	6	0	Defender
Luke Boden	England	2006-2009	19	0	Midfielder
Adam Bolder	England	2008	13	2	Midfielder
Bob Bolder	England	1977–1983	196	0	Goalkeeper
Tommy Bolland	England	1908–1909	13	1	
Henry Bolsover	England	1900	2	0	
Pablo Facundo Bonvin	Argentina	2001–2002	23	3	Forward
Andy Booth	England	1996–2001	133	28	Forward
John Bostock	England	2012 (loan)	4	0	Midfielder
Samuel Bosworth	England	1899	7	0	
Jay Bothroyd	England	2012–2013 (loan)	14	1	Forward
Madjid Bougherra	Algeria	2006–2007	28	2	Defender
Lee Bradbury	England	2002–2003	11	3	Defender/Forward
Martin Bradley	England	1910–1911	2	0	
Carl Bradshaw	England	1986–1988	43	7	Defender
Frank Bradshaw	England	1904–1910	87	37	Defender/Forward
Paul Bradshaw	England	1976–1978	74	11	Midfielder
Alec Brady	England	1892–1899	176	38	Forward
Bob Brandon	England	1891	2	0	
Harry Brandon	Scotland	1891–1898	170	17	
Tom Brandon	Scotland	1892–1893	36	2	
Ian Branfoot	England	1965–1969	36	0	Defender
Kenny Brannigan	Scotland	1987	1	0	Defender
Guy Branston	England	2004–2005	11	0	Defender
Archie Brash	Scotland	1894–1900	131	26	Midfielder
George Bratley	England	1933	3	0	Defender
Teddy Brayshaw	England	1884–1891	19	1	Defender
Jack Breedon	England	1930–1934	47	0	Goalkeeper
Charles Brelsford	England	1912–1914	5	0	
Tom Brelsford	England	1920–1924	122	6	
C. Bretnall	England	1920	1	0	
Mark Bright	England	1992–1997	171	66	Forward
Jim Briscoe	England	1946–1947	5	3	
Lee Briscoe	England	1994–2000	78	1	Defender/Midfielder
Tom Brittleton	England	1905–1920	373	33	Defender
Albert Broadbent	England	1955–1957	83	17	Midfielder
Tom Brolly	Ireland	1933–1934	2	0	
Leigh Bromby	England	1999–2004	98	2	Defender
Marlon Broomes	England	2001–2002	19	0	Defender
Bobby Brown	England	1974–1975	21	3	
James Brown	England	1895	10	0	
Jack Brown	England	1923–1937	507	0	Goalkeeper
Richard Brown	England	1893	2	0	
Bob Brown	England	1892–1894	52	9	
Alex Bruce	Republic of Ireland	2005 (loan)	6	0	Defender
Bob Bruce	England	1935	5	0	
Chris Brunt	Northern Ireland	2004–2007	140	23	Midfielder
Steve Bryant	England	1976 (loan)	3	0	
Lee Bullen	Scotland	2004–2008	134	8	
Rob Burch	England	2007–2008	2	0	Goalkeeper
Mark Burchill	Scotland	2003–2004	5	0	
Harry Burgess	England	1929–1935	215	70	International
Andy Burgin	England	1965	3	0	
Jack Burkinshaw	England	1913–1920	61	10	
Laurie Burkinshaw	England	1911–1914	25	7	
Herbert Burridge	England	1926–1929	26	0	
David Burrows	England	2002–2003	23	0	
Horace Burrows	England	1932–1939	263	8	
Deon Burton	Jamaica	2006–2009	124	27	Forward
Harry Burton	England	1903–1909	198	0	
Kenny Burton	England	1968–1971	61	2	
Sergiu Buș	Romania	2015–2017	10	1	Forward
Barry Butler	England	1954–1955	36	1	
Lewis Buxton	England	2008–2015	207	6	Defender
Stephen Bywater	England	2011 (loan), 2011–2013	38	0	Goalkeeper
John Callaghan	England	1896	4	2	
Danny Cameron	Scotland	1973–1975	38	1	
Jimmy Campbell	Scotland	1911–1920	157	3	International
Phil Campbell	England	1980	1	0	
Ron Capewell	England	1952–1953	30	0	Goalkeeper
Alf Capper	England	1914–1921	62	4	
Benito Carbone	Italy	1996–1999	107	26	Forward
David Cargill	Scotland	1956–1958	14	0	
Franz Carr	England	1989	12	0	(loan)
Scott Carson	England	2006	9	0	Goalkeeper
Ted Catlin	England	1931–1939	230	0	International
Tom Cawley	England	1882–1891	35	21	
Bruce Chalmers	England	1892–1893	37	2	
Mark Chamberlain	England	1985–1988	66	8	
Adam Chambers	England	2004	11	0	(loan)
Harry Chapman	England	1901–1911	298	99	
Lee Chapman	England	1984–1988	187	79	Forward
Billy Chapman	England	1924	4	0	
Sydney Chedgzoy	England	1937	4	0	
Harold Clark	England	1957	1	0	
Leon Clarke	England	2007–2010	83	18	Forward
Matt Clarke	England	1996–1999	4	0	Goalkeeper
Dave Clements	Northern Ireland	1971–1973	87	0	
Juan Cobián	Argentina	1998–1999	9	0	
Joe Cockcroft	England	1946–1948	96	2	
Ronnie Codd	England	1928	2	0	
William Cole	England	1898–1901	10	1	
Simon Coleman	England	1993–1994	21	1	
Tony Coleman	England	1969–1970	27	2	
Bill Collier	Scotland	1924–1925	14	0	
John Collins	Wales	1976	11	0	
Patrick Collins	England	2004–2006	52	1	
Wayne Collins	England	1996–1998	31	6	
Tony Conwell	England	1953–1955	47	0	
Terry Cooke	England	2000–2001, 2003–2004	43	3	
Alf Cooper	England	1919	3	0	
Joe Cooper	England	1921	1	0	
Sedley Cooper	England	1933–1935	18	4	
W. Cooper	England	1887	1	0	
Barry Corr	Republic of Ireland	2005–2007	17	0	
Graham Coughlan	Republic of Ireland	2005–2007	51	5	
Brian Cox	England	1978–1980	26	0	
Roy Coyle	Northern Ireland	1972–1974	50	3	
Bobby Craig	Scotland	1959–1962	99	28	
Jim Craig	Scotland	1973	6	0	
Tommy Craig	Scotland	1969–1974	233	39	
Tony Crane	England	1999–2003	48	4	
Ian Cranson	England	1988–1989	30	0	
Christopher Crapper	England	1906	1	0	
Percy Crawshaw	England	1899–1904	9	0	
Tommy Crawshaw	England	1894–1908	465	24	International
Richard Cresswell	England	1999–2000	31	2	Forward
Billy Crinson	England	1907–1908	4	0	Goalkeeper
Mark Crossley	Wales	2006–2007	17	1	Goalkeeper
Alec Cruickshank	England	1926	2	0	
Tony Cunningham	Jamaica	1984	28	5	
Terry Curran	England	1979–1982	138	39	
Robert Curry	England	1937	1	0	
Norman Curtis	England	1950–1960	324	21	
Dave Cusack	England	1974–1978	136	1	
Jimmy Dailey	Scotland	1946–1949	41	14	
Malcolm Darling	Scotland	1977	3	0	
Jack Darroch	Scotland	1892–1893	18	0	
Brian Davies	England	1966	4	1	
George Davies	England	1951–1955	109	2	
Harry Davis	England	1892–1899	180 (Note: the Sheffield Wednesday Archive website assigned 22 FA Cup appearances and 8 goals to Harry Davis (born 1873) who departed in 1899; these should be assigned to Harry Davis (born 1879) who joined in 1900.)	40	
Harry Davis	England	1900–1907	235	67	International
John Davis	Wales	1977	1	0	
Tommy Davison	England	1931–1932	18	0	
Teddy Davison	England	1908–1926	424	0	International
Cameron Dawson	England	2013–2024	129	0	Goalkeeper
Gilles De Bilde	Belgium	1999–2001	59	13	International
Marc Degryse	Belgium	1995–1996	38	8	International
Fred Dent	England	1920	4	1	
Neil Dewar	Scotland	1933–1937	95	50	
Paolo Di Canio	Italy	1997–1999	48	17	Forward
Wally Dickinson	England	1922–1923	8	0	
Francis Dillon	England	1938–1939	9	0	
Michele Di Piedi	Italy	2000–2003	44	7	
Drissa Diallo	France	2005–2006	12	0	
Colin Dobson	England	1961–1966	193	52	
Chris Dodds	England	1930	1	0	
O'Neill Donaldson	England	1995–1998	14	3	
Simon Donnelly	Scotland	1999–2003	62	8	
Derek Dooley	England	1947–1953	63	63	Forward
Hugh Dowd	Northern Ireland	1974–1978	109	0	
Michael Dowling	England	1910–1911	7	0	
Steve Downes	England	1969–1971	33	5	
Jack Driscoll	England	1937–1938	6	2	
Allenby Driver	England	1938–1946	13	6	
George Drury	England	1936–1938	47	11	
Willie Dryburgh	England	1897–1902	49	9	
Jack Dungworth	England	1885–1890	15	2	
Walter Dunlop	England	1892	1	0	
John Dunn	England	1920	8	0	
Chris Eagles	England	2005 (loan)	25	3	
Jack Earp	England	1893–1900	174	8	
Walter Eaton	England	1905	1	0	
James Edmondson	England	1919–1920	14	2	
Len Edwards	Wales	1951	2	0	
Robert M. Eggo	England	1920	23	0	
Efan Ekoku	Nigeria	2000–2003	59	14	
Keith Ellis	England	1955–1963	118	60	
Sam Ellis	England	1964–1972	155	1	
Etiënne Esajas	Netherlands	2007–2010	60	5	Midfield
Peter Eustace	England	1962–1975	268	26	
Paul Evans	South Africa	2002–2003	7	0	Goalkeeper
Richard Evans	Wales	2003–2006	11	1	
I. Eyre	England	1904	1	0	
R. Eyre	England	1924	1	0	
Bill Fallon	Ireland	1938–1939	51	13	
John Fantham	England	1956–1969	435	167	International
Greg Fee	England	1987–1989	30	1	
Peter Feely	England	1976	24	2	
Billy Felton	England	1923–1929	164	0	International
Bobby Ferguson	Scotland	1973–1974	5	0	(loan)
Ronnie Ferguson	England	1974–1975	11	1	
Bob Ferrier	Scotland	1894–1905	329	18	
Alan Finney	England	1949–1965	503	90	
T. Fish	England	1901–1902	8	0	
Ian Fleming	Scotland	1979	17	2	
Brough Fletcher	England	1926	2	0	
Doug Fletcher	England	1949	4	0	
Yoann Folly	France	2006–2008	41	1	
David Ford	England	1965–1969	135	37	
Fernando Forestieri	Italy	2015–2020	134	40	Forward
Oscar Fox	England	1946–1950	47	4	
Peter Fox	England	1972–1978	49	0	Goalkeeper
W. Fox	England	1895	4	0	
Frank Foxall	England	1907–1910	45	9	
Trevor Francis	England	1990–1994	89	9	Forward
Frank Froggatt	England	1921–1927	95	1	
Redfern Froggatt	England	1942–1960	458	149	International
John Frye	Scotland	1961	1	0	
Tom Gale	England	1946–1947	13	0	
Kevin Gallacher	Scotland	2002	3	0	
Paul Gallacher	Scotland	2005	8	0	Goalkeeper
Tony Galvin	Republic of Ireland	1987–1989	42	1	International
Eddie Gannon	Republic of Ireland	1949–1955	219	4	
Derek Geary	Republic of Ireland	1997–2004	104	0	
Duncan Gemmell	Scotland	1892	3	0	
Don Gibson	England	1955–1960	115	0	
Peter Gilbert	Wales	2005–2009	41	0	Defender
Jimmy Gill	England	1913–1920	43	10	
A. Gillies	England	1897	2	0	
R. Glen	England	1895	1	0	
Teddy Glennon	England	1910–1915	133	42	
Derrick Goodfellow	England	1936–1947	76	0	
Bill Gooing	England	1895–1897	3	1	
W. Gosling	England	1901	5	0	
Bill Gowdy	Ireland	1932	1	0	
David Graham	Scotland	2005–2007	24	2	
David Grant	England	1977–1982	149	5	
Lee Grant	England	2007–2010	136	0	Goalkeeper
G. Gray	England	1921–1922	5	0	
Michael Gray	England	2009–2010	43	2	Midfielder
Simon Grayson	England	2000 (loan)	5	0	
Albert Green	England	1936–1937	6	1	
Adam Green	England	2005 (loan)	3	0	
Ryan Green	Wales	2002–2003	4	0	
Ron Greensmith	England	1955–1957	6	1	
Ross Greenwood	England	2004–2005	2	0	
Bob Gregg	England	1928–1930	39	7	
Tony Gregory	England	1985–1989	21	1	
Colin Gregson	England	1977	3	0	
Billy Griffin	England	1958–1962	37	21	
Tom Grosvenor	England	1936–1937	23	1	
Peter Grummitt	England	1970–1973	130	0	
Matt Hamshaw	England	1998–2005	88	6	
John Harkes	United States	1990–1993	82	7	International
Steve Harkness	England	2000–2002	30	1	
Kadeem Harris	England	2019–2021	88	3	
Alan Harper	England	1988–1989	32	0	
Steve Haslam	England	1998–2004	143	1	
Des Hazel	Saint Kitts and Nevis	1986–1988	7	0	
Paul Heckingbottom	England	2004–2006	42	6	
Paul Heffernan	Scotland	2010–2011	17	3	
Jérémy Hélan	France	2012–2013 (loan), 2013–2016	145	4	
Bill Hemmingfield	England	1898–1899, 1903–1907	47	13	
Willie Henderson	Scotland	1972–1974	50	5	
Ian Hendon	England	2000–2003	49	2	
John Hickton	England	1963–1966	53	21	
John Hills	England	2005–2007	45	0	
Andy Hinchcliffe	England	1998–2002	86	7	Defender
Richard Hinds	England	2007–2011	67	2	Defender
David Hirst	England	1986–1997	358	149	Forward
Martin Hodge	England	1983–1988	249	0	Goalkeeper
David Hodgson	England	1988–1989	11	1	
Stuart Holden	United States	2013 (loan)	4	0	Midfielder
Grant Holt	England	2003–2004	24	3	Forward
Mark Hooper	England	1927–1937	423	136	
Barry Horne	Wales	2000	7	0	
Brian Hornsby	England	1978–1981	124	30	
Steve Howard	England	2013 (loan)	8	1	Forward
Ritchie Humphreys	England	1995–2001	82	8	
Douglas Hunt	England	1938–1946	50	32	
George Hunt	England	1946–1948	32	8	
Graham Hyde	England	1988–1999	174	11	
Michael Ihiekwe	England	2022–2025	63	1	Defender
Klas Ingesson	Sweden	1994–1996	13	2	
**Dominic Iorfa**	England	2019–present	179	6	Defender
Archie Irvine	Scotland	1968–1969	35	1	
Wayne Jacobs	England	1987–1988	6	0	
Jimmy Jamieson	Scotland	1893–1898	125	3	
Francis Jeffers	England	2007–2010	54	5	Forward
Derek Jefferson	England	1976	5	0	(loan)
Nigel Jemson	England	1991–1994	51	9	
Lucas Joao	Angola	2015–2019	127	29	Forward
David Johnson	Jamaica	2002 (Loan)	7	2	
Jermain Johnson	Jamaica	2007–2014	231	25	Midfielder
Kevin Johnson	England	1970–1971	6	0	
Marvin Johnson	England	2021–2025	149	10	Forward
Michael Johnson	Jamaica	2007 (loan)	13	0	
Peter Johnson	England	1957–1965	207	6	
Tommy Johnson	England	2001	8	3	
Roger Johnson	England	2013–2014 (Loan)	17	0	Defender
Allan Johnston	Scotland	2002–2003	12	2	
Brian Joicey	England	1971–1976	164	53	
Brad Jones	Australia	2006 (loan)	15	0	Goalkeeper
Daniel Jones	England	2010–2013	50	0	Defender/Midfielder
Kenwyne Jones	Trinidad and Tobago	2005–2006	7	7	Forward
Mike Jones	England	2012	15	0	Midfielder
Rob Jones	England	2011 (loan), 2011-2012	45	5	Defender
Ryan Jones	Wales	1992–1995	41	6	
Wim Jonk	Netherlands	1998–2001	70	3	Midfielder
Sigurður Jónsson	Iceland	1985–1989	67	5	
Tony Kay	England	1955–1963	203	10	
Fred Kean	England	1920–1928	247	8	International
Phil King	England	1989–1994	159	2	
George Kirby	England	1959	3	0	
Ian Knight	England	1985–1989	21	0	Defender
Leon Knight	England	2002–2003	24	3	(loan)
Ken Knighton	England	1973–1975	84	4	
Darko Kovačević	Yugoslavia	1996	16	4	
Shefki Kuqi	Finland	2002–2003	68	19	
David Layne	England	1962–1964, 1972	81	58	
Willie Layton	England	1895-1910	361	2	Defender
Tony Leach	England	1927–1934	260	12	
Graeme Lee	England	2003–2006	75	7	
Tom Lees	England	2014–2021	274	10	Defender
Rocky Lekaj	Norway	2007–2010	4	0	
Aaron Lescott	England	2000–2001	37	0	
Chris Lines	England	2011–2013	53	4	Midfielder
Leroy Lita	England	2013 (loan)	17	6	Forward
Massimo Luongo	Australia	2019–2022	64	4	Midfielder
Ryan Lowe	England	2011–2012	30	9	Forward
David Lucas	England	2003–2006	80	0	Goalkeeper
Charlie Luke	England	1936–1938	43	8	Midfielder
Kenny Lunt	England	2006–2009	41	0	
Jack Lyall	Scotland	1901–1909	295	0	Goalkeeper & International
Mick Lyons	England	1982–1985	135	12	
Ben Marshall (loan)	England	2011–2012	22	5	Midfielder
Sean McAllister	England	2006–2010	68	4	Midfielder
Tom McAnearney	Scotland	1950–1965	382	22	Midfielder
Jim McAnearney	Scotland	1954–1959	40	10	Midfielder
Rory McArdle	Northern Ireland	2004–2007	1	0	Defender
Jim McCalliog	Scotland	1965–1969	150	19	Midfielder
Andy McCulloch	England	1979–1983	149	49	Forward
Don McEvoy	England	1954–1958	105	1	Defender
Jon-Paul McGovern	Scotland	2004–2006	61	8	Midfielder
Dave McIntosh	Scotland	1948–1957	308	0	Goalkeeper
Steve MacKenzie	England	1991	15	2	Midfielder
David McGoldrick	England	2011	4	1	Forward
Paul McLaren	England	2001–2004	106	9	Midfielder
David McLean	Scotland	1911–1919	147	100	Forward
Steve MacLean	Scotland	2004–2007	90	35	Forward
Lewis McMahon	England	2004–2005	31	2	Midfielder
Bob McSkimming	Scotland	1910–1920	195	0	Defender
Lawrie Madden	England	1983–1991	261	5	Defender
Danny Maddix	Jamaica	2001–2003	66	3	Defender
Jim Magilton	Northern Ireland	1997–1999	27	1	Midfielder
Jock Malloch	Scotland	1900–1908	154	12	Outside left
Chris Marsden	England	2004–2005	18	0	Midfielder
William Marsden	England	1924–1930	221	9	Defender
Brian Marwood	England	1984–1988	128	27	Midfielder
Leonard Massarella	England	1938–1939	34	10	Midfielder
Christian Mayrleb (loan)	Austria	1997–1998	7	0	Forward
Don Megson	England	1952–1970	442	7	Defender
Gary Megson	England	1981–1984, 1985–1989	286	33	Midfielder
Neil Mellor (loan)	England	2010–2011	43	20	Forward
Tommy Miller	England	2009–2011	63	12	Midfielder
Walter Millership	England	1930–1939	237	33	Defender/Forward
Ante Miročević	Yugoslavia	1980–1983	70	7	Midfielder
Vic Mobley	England	1964–1969	210	8	Defender
Nathan Modest	England	2008–2011	5	0	Forward
Matt Moralee	England	1901–1904	4	1	Half back
Haydn Morley	England	1890	7	0	Half back
Clinton Morrison	Republic of Ireland	2010–2012	72	14	Forward
Michael Morrison	England	2011	15	0	Defender
Owen Morrison	Northern Ireland	1998–2003	55	8	Midfielder
Billy Mosforth	England	1880–1888	25	6	Midfielder
Daryl Murphy (loan)	Republic of Ireland	2005	4	0	Midfielder/Forward
Jimmy Murray	Ireland	1909–1911	13	4	
Robbie Mustoe	England	2003–2004	25	1	Midfielder
Guylain Ndumbu-Nsungu	DR Congo	2003–2005	35	10	Forward
Liam Needham	England	2004–2005	1	0	
Steve Nicol	Scotland	1995–1998	49	0	
Roland Nilsson	Sweden	1989–1994	186	3	International
Eric Nixon	England	2003–2004	1	0	Goalkeeper
Eddie Nolan	Republic of Ireland	2010 (loan)	14	1	International
Ian Nolan	Northern Ireland	1994–2000	187	4	International
Frank Noble	England	1963?–1966?	2	0	
Adthe Nuhiu	Kosovo	2013–2020	244	32	International
Scott Oakes	England	1996–2000	24	1	
Burton O'Brien	Scotland	2005–2008	104	6	
Joey O'Brien	Republic of Ireland	2004–2005	15	2	(loan)
Patrick O'Connell	Ireland	1909–1912	21	0	
James O'Connor	Republic of Ireland	2008–2011	151	6	Midfielder
Neil O'Donnell	Scotland	1975–1976	47	2	
Phil O'Donnell	Scotland	1999–2003	25	1	Midfielder
Ralph O'Donnell	England	1951–1962	183	3	
Richard O'Donnell	England	2006–2012	20	0	Goalkeeper
Chris O'Grady	England	2011–2013	63	13	Forward
Gavin Oliver	England	1980–1985	28	0	
Seyi Olofinjana	Nigeria	2013 (loan)	6	0	Midfielder
Kim Olsen	Denmark	2004	12	0	
Isaiah Osbourne	England	2011	11	0	
Jon Otsemobor	England	2010–2012	37	0	
Gary Owen	England	1987–1988	14	0	
Lloyd Owusu	Ghana	2002–2004	52	9	
Jack Palethorpe	England	1934–1935	34	17	
Carlton Palmer	England	1989–1994, 2001	286	18	International
**Liam Palmer**	Scotland	2010–present	509	14	
Richie Partridge	Republic of Ireland	2005–2006	20	1	
Callum Paterson	Scotland	2020–2025	167	26	
Lee Peacock	Scotland	2004–2006	58	9	
Andy Pearce	England	1993–1995	83	4	
John Pearson	England	1980–1985	128	27	
Mark Pearson	England	1963–1965	42	11	
Nigel Pearson	England	1987–1994	221	20	
Trevor Pearson	England	1971–1972	4	0	
Nejc Pečnik	Slovenia	2012–2013	14	0	Midfielder
Joey Pelupessy	Indonesia	2018–2021	119	1	Midfielder
Mark Pembridge	Wales	1995–1998	108	13	
Dan Petrescu	Romania	1994–1995	39	3	
Bob Petrie	Scotland	1894–1897	52	3	
Charlie Petrie	England	1921–1925	59	23	
Adem Poric	Australia	1993–1998	16	0	
Ian Porterfield	Scotland	1977–1979	106	3	
Darren Potter	Republic of Ireland	2009–2011	96	8	
Darryl Powell	Jamaica	2003	8	0	
Mick Prendergast	England	1969–1978	206	59	
Kevin Pressman	England	1985–2004	478	0	Goalkeeper
Adam Proudlock	England	2002–2006	67	19	
Danny Pugh	England	2013 (loan)	16	1	Defender/Midfielder
Graham Pugh	England	1965–1972	142	7	
Darren Purse	England	2009–2011	61	2	Defender
Eddie Quigley	England	1947–1949	78	52	
Alan Quinn	Republic of Ireland	1997–2004	180	17	
James Quinn	Northern Ireland	2005	15	2	
John Quinn	England	1959–1967	196	25	
Albert Quixall	England	1951–1958	260	65	
Nile Ranger	England	2012	8	2	Forward
Mark Reynolds	Scotland	2011–2013	13	0	Defender
Adam Reach	England	2016–2021	230	24	Midfielder
Ellis Rimmer	England	1928–1938	418	140	International
Stuart Ripley	England	2001–2001 (loan)	6	1	
George Robertson	Scotland	1910–1919	173	31	
Mark Robins	England	2003–2004	15	3	
Jackie Robinson	England	1935–1947	119	39	
Craig Rocastle	Grenada	2005–2006	33	1	
Rodri	Spain	2012 (loan)	12	1	Forward
Peter Rodrigues	Wales	1970–1975	162	2	
Maurice Ross	Scotland	2005–2006	2	0	
Harry Ruddlesdin	England	1898–1907	285	7	International
Petter Rudi	Norway	1997–2001	89	10	International
Ben Sahar	Israel	2008 (loan)	12	3	Forward
Lloyd Sam	Ghana	2006 (loan)	4	0	Midfielder
Francesco Sanetti	Italy	1998–1999	7	1	Forward
Philip Scott	Scotland	1999–2002	9	1	Midfielder
Goce Sedloski	Macedonia	1998–1999	4	0	Defender
Jimmy Seed	England	1927–1931	146	37	Forward
Chris Sedgwick	England	2010–2012	53	5	Midfielder
Jackie Sewell	England	1951–1955	175	92	Forward
Craig Shakespeare	England	1989–1990	17	0	Midfielder
Wilf Sharp	Scotland	1934–1936	58	2	Defender
Jon Shaw	England	2003–2004	18	2	Forward
Gary Shelton	England	1982–1987	239	24	Midfielder
John Sheridan	Republic of Ireland	1989–1996	244	33	Midfielder
Roy Shiner	England	1955–1959	153	93	Forward
Peter Shirtliff	England	1977–1986, 1989–1993	358	11	Defender
Enoch Showunmi	Nigeria	2008	10	0	Forward
Carl Shutt	England	1985–1987	48	21	Forward
Gerald Sibon	Netherlands	1999–2002	150	43	Forward
Mamady Sidibé	Mali	2012–2013 (loan)	10	1	Forward
Frank Simek	United States	2005–2010	119	2	Defender
George Simpson	England	1903–1909	160	37	Outside left
Vivian Simpson	England	1901–1906	38	11	Forward
Bartosz Slusarski	Poland	2008 (loan)	14	2	Forward
Wade Small	England	2006–2009	68	7	Midfielder
Dean Smith	England	2003–2004	62	1	Defender
Jimmy Smith	England	2008–2009 (loan)	12	0	Midfielder
Jock Smith	Scotland	1893–1894	18	1	Forward
Mark Smith	England	1978–1987	352	20	Defender
Paul Smith	England	2003–2005	31	2	Defender/Midfielder
Wilf Smith	England	1963–1970	206	4	Defender
Akpo Sodje	England	2007–2010	41	9	Forward
Trond Egil Soltvedt	Norway	2001–2003	74	2	Midfielder
Franck Songo'o	Cameroon	2008 (loan)	12	1	Midfielder
Fred Spiksley	England	1892–1905	324	116	Midfielder
Peter Springett	England	1967–1974	207	0	Goalkeeper
Ron Springett	England	1958–1967	384	0	Goalkeeper
Tommy Spurr	England	2006-2011	211	7	Defender
Pavel Srníček	Czech Republic	1998–2000	44	0	Goalkeeper
Simon Stainrod	England	1985	15	2	Forward
Ron Staniforth	England	1955–1959	107	2	Defender
Ronnie Starling	England	1932–1937	176	31	Forward
Dejan Stefanović	Serbia	1995–1999	66	4	Defender
George Stephenson	England	1931–1933	45	21	
Mel Sterland	England	1979–1989	347	49	Defender
Jimmy Stewart	England	1902–1908	141	59	Forward
Robbie Stockdale	Scotland	2000 (loan)	6	0	Defender
Alfred Strange	England	1927–1935	272	22	Forward
Chris Stringer	England	2000–2004	12	0	Goalkeeper
Frank Stringfellow	England	1908–1910	20	5	Forward
Brian Strutt	Malta	1979–1980	2	0	Forward
Dave Sunley	England	1970–1976	145	26	Forward
Jack Surtees	England	1934–1936	40	5	Forward
Peter Swan	England	1952–1973	301	0	Defender
Drew Talbot	England	2004–2007	33	5	
James Tavernier (loan)	England	2011–2012	8	0	Defender
Billy Taylor	England	1919–1921	16	4	
Ian Taylor	England	1994	14	1	
Gary Teale	Scotland	2010–2011	41	2	International
Emerson Thome	Brazil	1998–1999	61	1	
Ola Tidman	Sweden	2003–2005	13	0	Goalkeeper
Keith Treacy	Republic of Ireland	2012	7	1	Midfielder
Orlando Trustfull	Netherlands	1996–1997	19	3	
Marcus Tudgay	England	2006–2011	187	48	Forward
Matthew Tumilty	England	2011–2012	1	0	
Daniel Uchechi	Nigeria	2011	5	0	Forward
Imre Varadi	England	1983–1985, 1988–1990	121	46	Forward
Luke Varney	England	2009–2010	43	11	(loan)
Chris Waddle	England	1992–1996	147	15	Midfield
Richard Walden	England	1976–1978	115	1	
Billy Walker	Scotland	1923–1924	19	5	
Colin Walker	New Zealand	1986–1988	2	0	
Cyril Walker	England	1937	4	0	
Des Walker	England	1993–2001	362	0	Defender
Fred Walker	England	1937–1939	12	1	
Tommy Walker	England	1926–1935	287	3	
Adrian Wall	England	1968	3	0	
Ross Wallace	Scotland	2015–2018	124	13	Midfielder
George Waller	England	1887–1890	14	2	
Ronnie Wallwork	England	2008	7	0	
Tommy Ward	England	1946–1948	38	19	
Paul Warhurst	England	1991–1993	88	18	
Gordon Watson	England	1991–1995	66	15	
Steve Watson	England	2007–2009	56	5	
Sanchez Watt	England	2011–2012	4	0	Forward
Julian Watts	England	1992–1996	18	1	
Nicky Weaver	England	2005–2006 (loan), 2010–2013	67	0	Goalkeeper
Colin West	England	1987–1989	57	13	
Frank Westlake	England	1937–1950	110	0	Defender
Ashley Westwood	England	2000–2003	96	9	
Keiren Westwood	England	2014–2021	199	0	Goalkeeper
Glenn Whelan	Republic of Ireland	2004–2008	159	14	Midfielder
Jackie Whitehouse	England	1929	10	1	
Jack Whitham	England	1967–1970	62	31	
Guy Whittingham	England	1994–1999	130	25	
Steve Whitton	England	1989–1990	36	8	
Connor Wickham	England	2013–2014 (loan)	17	9	Forward
Derek Wilkinson	England	1954–1965	233	58	
Howard Wilkinson	England	1962–1966	22	3	
Mallik Wilks	England	2022–2025	42	3	Forward
Michael Williams	England	1991–1997	23	1	
Paul Williams	England	1990–1992	111	28	
Andrew Wilson	Scotland	1900–1920	545	216	International
Danny Wilson	Northern Ireland	1990–1993	98	11	International
George Wilson	England	1920–1925	197	5	International
Mark Wilson	England	2003–2004	3	0	(loan)
Dean Windass	England	2001 (loan)	2	0	
Josh Windass	England	2020-2025	149	45	Forward
Dennis Woodhead	England	1947–1955	226	76	
Darren Wood	England	1989–1991	13	0	
Richard Wood	England	2003-2010	171	7	
Chris Woods	England	1991–1996	137	0	Goalkeeper
Nigel Worthington	Northern Ireland	1984–1994	417	15	International
Jocky Wright	Scotland	1898–1902	110	43	Inside forward
Rodger Wylde	England	1972–1980	193	66	
Gerry Young	England	1955–1970	310	13	International
