= List of Sheffield Wednesday F.C. international footballers =

Below is a list of football players who have gained full international caps whilst contracted (permanently) to Sheffield Wednesday F.C. The caps column only shows caps won while with Sheffield Wednesday - caps won while with other clubs are not shown.

Key

Initials	Competition
WC	FIFA World Cup
EC	UEFA European Championship
GC	CONCACAF Gold Cup

== Algeria ==
Player	Caps	Opponents
Madjid Bougherra	4	2006 – Gabon, Guinea, Gambia, Burkina Faso

== Belgium ==
Player	Caps	Opponents
Gilles De Bilde	8	1999 - England, Italy; 2000 - Portugal, Holland, Norway, Denmark, Turkey (EC), Bulgaria
Marc Degryse	3	1995 - Denmark, Cyprus; 1996 - France

== Benin ==
Player	Caps	Opponents
Reda Johnson	6	2011 - Libya, Ivory Coast, Ivory Coast, Burundi, Rwanda; 2012 - Ethiopia

== DR Congo ==
Player	Caps	Opponents
Jacques Maghoma	1	2015 - Iraq

== Curaçao ==
Player	Caps	Opponents
Darryl Lachman	4	2015 - El Salvador, El Salvador; 2016 - Barbados, Dominican Republic

== Czech Republic ==
Player	Caps	Opponents
Daniel Pudil	2	2016 - Armenia, Denmark
Pavel Srnicek	15	1999 - Belgium, Lithuania, Scotland, Poland, Estonia, Scotland, Lithuania, Bosnia-Herzegovina, Faroe Islands

== England ==
Player	Caps	Opponents
Billy Betts	1	1889 - Wales
Ernest Blenkinsop	26	1928 - France, Belgium, Northern Ireland, Wales; 1929 - Scotland, France, Belgium, Spain, Northern Ireland, Wales; 1930 - Scotland, Germany, Austria, Northern Ireland, Wales; 1931 - Scotland, France, Belgium, Northern Ireland, Wales, Spain; 1932 - Scotland, Northern Ireland, Wales, Austria; 1933 - Scotland
Frank Bradshaw	1	1908 - Austria
Teddy Brayshaw	1	1887 - Ireland
Tom Brittleton	5	1912 - Ireland, Wales, Scotland; 1913 - Scotland; 1914 - Wales
Jack Brown	6	1927 - Wales, Scotland, Belgium, Luxembourg, France; 1929 - Northern Ireland
Harry Burgess	4	1930 - Northern Ireland; 1931 - Scotland, France, Belgium
Horace Burrows	3	1934 - Hungary, Czechoslovakia; 1935 - Holland
Ted Catlin	5	1936 - Wales, Northern Ireland, Hungary; 1937 - Norway, Sweden
Charles Clegg	1	1872 - Scotland
William Clegg	1	1873 - Scotland
Tommy Crawshaw	10	1895 - Ireland; 1896 - Ireland, Wales, Scotland; 1897 - Ireland, Wales, Scotland; 1901 - Ireland; 1904 - Wales, Scotland
Harry Davis	3	1903 - Ireland, Wales, Scotland
Teddy Davison	1	1922 - Wales
John Fantham	1	1961 - Luxembourg
Billy Felton	1	1925 - France
Redfern Froggatt	4	1952 - Wales, Belgium; 1953 - Scotland, USA
Andy Hinchcliffe	2	1998 - Switzerland, Saudi Arabia
David Hirst	3	1991 - Australia, New Zealand; 1992 - France
Jack Hudson	1	1883 - Ireland
Fred Kean	7	1923 - Belgium, Scotland; 1924 - Wales, Northern Ireland; 1925 - Northern Ireland; 1926 - Belgium; 1927 - Luxembourg
Tony Leach	2	1930 - Northern Ireland, Wales
Billy Marsden	3	1929 - Wales; 1930 - Scotland, Germany
Billy Mosforth	9	1877 - Scotland; 1878 - Scotland; 1879 - Wales, Scotland; 1880 - Scotland, Wales; 1881 - Wales; 1882 - Scotland, Wales
Carlton Palmer	18	1992 - CIS, Hungary, Brazil, Finland, Denmark (EC), France (EC), Sweden (EC), Spain, Norway, Turkey; 1993 - San Marino, Turkey, Holland, Poland, Norway, USA, Brazil, Holland
Albert Quixall	5	1953 - Wales, Northern Ireland, Rest of Europe; 1955 - Spain, Portugal
Ellis Rimmer	4	1930 - Scotland, Germany, Austria; 1931 - Spain
Jackie Robinson	4	1937 - Finland; 1938 - Germany, Switzerland, Wales
Harry Ruddlesdin	4	1904 - Wales, Ireland; 1905 - Ireland
Jackie Sewell	6	1951 - Northern Ireland; 1952 - Austria, Switzerland, Northern Ireland; 1953 - Hungary; 1954 - Hungary
Andy Sinton	2	1993 - Holland, San Marino
Fred Spiksley	7	1893 - Wales, Scotland; 1894 - Ireland, Scotland; 1896 - Ireland; 1898 - Wales, Scotland
Ron Springett	33	1959 - Northern Ireland; 1960 - Scotland, Yugoslavia, Spain, Hungary, Northern Ireland, Luxembourg, Spain; 1961 - Scotland, Mexico, Portugal, Italy, Austria, Luxembourg, Wales, Portugal, Northern Ireland; 1962 - Austria, Scotland, Switzerland, Peru, Hungary (WC), Argentina (WC), Bulgaria (WC), Brazil (WC), France, Northern Ireland, Wales; 1963 - France, Switzerland; 1965 - Wales, Austria; 1966 - Norway
Ronnie Starling	1	1933 - Scotland
George Stephenson	1	1931 - France
Mel Sterland	1	1988 - Saudi Arabia
Jimmy Stewart	2	1907 - Wales, Scotland
Alf Strange	20	1930 - Scotland, Germany, Austria, Northern Ireland, Wales; 1931 - Scotland, France, Belgium, Northern Ireland, Wales, Spain; 1932 - Scotland, Northern Ireland, Austria; 1933 - Scotland, Italy, Switzerland, Ireland, Wales, France
Peter Swan	19	1960 - Yugoslavia, Spain, Hungary, Northern Ireland, Luxembourg, Spain, Wales; 1961 - Scotland, Mexico, Portugal, Italy, Austria, Luxembourg, Wales, Portugal, Northern Ireland; 1962 - Austria, Scotland, Switzerland
Des Walker	1	1993 - San Marino
George Wilson	12	1921 - Wales, Scotland, Belgium, Ireland; 1922 - Scotland, Ireland; 1923 - Wales, Belgium, Scotland, Ireland; 1924 - Wales, France
Chris Woods	19	1991 - Germany, Turkey, Poland; 1992 - France, CIS, Brazil, Finland, Denmark (EC), France (EC), Sweden (EC), Spain, Norway, Turkey; 1993 - San Marino, Turkey, Holland, Poland, Norway, USA
Gerry Young	1	1964 - Wales

== Finland ==
Player	Caps	Opponents
Shefki Kuqi	13	2002 - South Korea, Macedonia, Latvia, Republic of Ireland, Wales, Azerbaijan, Yugoslavia; 2003 - Northern Ireland, Italy, Norway, Serbia & Montenegro, Denmark, Wales

== Guinea ==
Player	Caps	Opponents
Kamil Zayatte	2	2013 - Egypt; 2014 - Uganda

== Iceland ==
Player	Caps	Opponents
Siggi Jonsson	14	1985 - Luxembourg, Scotland, Spain; 1986 - Republic of Ireland, France, USSR, East Germany; 1987 - France, East Germany, Norway; 1988 - USSR, Hungary; 1989 - USSR, Austria

== Republic of Ireland ==
Player	Caps	Opponents
Bill Fallon	4	1938 - Switzerland, Poland; 1939 - Hungary, Germany
Tony Galvin	9	1987 - Luxembourg, Bulgaria; 1988 - Romania, Poland, Norway, England (EC), USSR (EC), Holland (EC), Spain
Eddie Gannon	11	1949 - Belgium, Portugal, Sweden, Spain, Finland; 1950 - Norway; 1952 - West Germany, Austria; 1953 - Luxembourg, France; 1954 - Norway
Alan Quinn	4	2003 - Norway, Australia; 2004 - Jamaica, Holland
John Sheridan	29	1990 - Wales, Turkey, Malta, Italy (WC), Morocco, Turkey; 1991 - Chile, USA, Hungary; 1993 - Latvia, Spain; 1994 - Holland, Bolivia, Germany, Czech Republic, Italy (WC), Mexico (WC), Norway (WC), Holland (WC), Latvia, Liechtenstein, Northern Ireland; 1995 - England, Northern Ireland, Portugal, Liechtenstein, Austria, Austria, Holland
Keiren Westwood	4	2015 - England; 2016 - Oman; 2017 - Iceland, Uruguay

== Jamaica ==
Player	Caps	Opponents
Deon Burton	9	2006 - England; 2008 - Trinidad & Tobago, St. Vincent and the Grenadines, Trinidad & Tobago, Grenada, Bahamas, Bahamas, Canada, Mexico
Jermaine Johnson	17	2007 - El Salvador; 2008 - Trinidad & Tobago, Mexico, Canada; 2009 - Nigeria, El Salvador, Panama, Canada (GC), Costa Rica (GC), El Salvador (GC), South Africa; 2013 - Mexico, Panama, Costa Rica, USA, Honduras, Panama

== Kosovo ==
Player	Caps	Opponents
Atdhe Nuhiu	18	2017 – Iceland (2x), Turkey, Croatia, Finland, Ukraine, Latvia
Atdhe Nuhiu	18	2018 – Madagascar, Burkina Faso, Albania, Faroe Islands (2x), Azerbaijan
Atdhe Nuhiu	18	2019 – Denmark, Gibraltar, Czech Republic, England, Greece

== Macedonia ==
Player	Caps	Opponents
Goce Sedloski	6	1998 - Bulgaria, Malta, Egypt, Croatia, Malta; 1999 - Albania

== Netherlands ==
Player	Caps	Opponents
Wim Jonk	1	1999 - Denmark

== Northern Ireland ==
Player	Caps	Opponents
Chris Brunt	10	2004 - Switzerland; 2005 - Germany, Malta, Wales, Austria, Portugal; 2006 - Estonia, Wales; 2007 - Liechtenstein, Sweden
Dave Clements	13	1971 - USSR, USSR; 1972 - Spain, Scotland, England, Wales, Bulgaria; 1973 - Cyprus, Portugal, Cyprus, England, Scotland, Wales
Roy Coyle	5	1973 - Portugal, Cyprus, Wales, Bulgaria, Portugal
Hugh Dowd	2	1974 - Norway, Sweden
Bill Gowdy	1	1932 - Scotland
Jim Magilton	2	1997 - Portugal; 1998 - Spain
English McConnell	5	1909 - Scotland, Scotland; 1910 - England, Scotland, Wales
James Murray	1	1910 - Wales
Ian Nolan	11	1996 - Armenia, Germany, Albania; 1997 - Portugal, Ukraine, Germany, Portugal; 1999 - Germany, Finland; 2000 - Malta, Hungary
Patrick O'Connell	2	1912 - England, Scotland
James Quinn	1	2005 - Poland
Danny Sonner	5	1999 - Germany, Canada; 2000 - Luxembourg, Malta, Hungary
Sammy Todd	3	1970 - Spain; 1971 - Cyprus, Cyprus
Danny Wilson	6	1990 - Yugoslavia, Denmark, Austria; 1991 - Faroe Islands, Austria; 1992 - Scotland
Nigel Worthington	50	1984 - Wales, Finland, Israel; 1985 - Spain, Turkey, Romania, England; 1986 - Denmark, Algeria (WC), Spain (WC), England, Turkey; 1987 - Israel, England, Yugoslavia, Yugoslavia, Turkey; 1988 - Greece, Poland, France, Malta, Republic of Ireland, Hungary, Spain; 1989 - Malta, Hungary, Republic of Ireland; 1990 - Uruguay, Yugoslavia, Denmark, Austria; 1991 - Faroe Islands, Austria, Denmark; 1992 - Scotland, Lithuania, Germany, Albania, Spain, Denmark; 1993 - Republic of Ireland, Spain, Lithuania, Latvia, Latvia, Denmark, Republic of Ireland; 1994 - Liechtenstein, Colombia, Mexico

== Norway ==
Player	Caps	Opponents
Petter Rudi	13	1997 - Colombia; 1998 - France, Mexico, Romania, Latvia, Egypt; 1999 - Italy, Greece, Georgia, Jamaica, Georgia, Albania, Greece

== Portugal ==
Player	Caps	Opponents
Lucas Joao	2	2015 - Russia, Luxembourg

== Romania ==
Player	Caps	Opponents
Dan Petrescu	10	1994 - Azerbaijan, France, England, Slovakia, Israel; 1995 - Poland, Azerbaijan, Israel, Poland, France

== Scotland ==
Player	Caps	Opponents
Barry Bannan	7	2016 - Czech Republic, Malta, Lithuania, Slovakia; 2017 - Canada, Slovakia, Slovenia
Jimmy Blair	2	1920 - Ireland, England
Jimmy Campbell	1	1913 - Wales
Steven Fletcher	5	2016 - Malta, Slovakia; 2017 - Slovenia; 2018 - Albania, Israel
Jack Lyall	1	1905 - England
Jim McCalliog	4	1967 - England, Northern Ireland, Russia; 1968 - Denmark
Stevie May	1	2014 - England
David McLean	1	1912 - England
Liam Palmer	6	2019 - Kazakhstan(2), Russia, San Marino, Cyprus; 2020 - Czech Republic
Callum Paterson	2	2020 - Slovakia, Czech Republic
George Robertson	3	1912 - Wales; 1923 - Ireland, England
Andrew Wilson	6	1907 - England; 1908 - England; 1912 - England; 1913 - England, Wales; 1914 - Ireland

== Slovenia ==
Player	Caps	Opponents
Nejc Pecnik	2	2012 - Norway, Macedonia

== Sweden ==
Player	Caps	Opponents
Niclas Alexandersson	14	1999 - Tunisia, Luxembourg, Poland, Republic of Ireland, Austria, Bulgaria, Luxembourg, Poland; 2000 - Italy, Denmark, Spain, Belgium (EC), Turkey (EC), Italy (EC)
Klas Ingesson	2	1994 - Iceland; 1995 - Hungary
Roland Nilsson	31	1990 - Belgium, Algeria, Wales, Finland, Brazil (WC), Scotland (WC), Costa Rica (WC), Denmark, West Germany; 1991 - Colombia, Denmark, Norway, Yugoslavia; 1992 - Poland, Hungary, France (EC), Denmark (EC), England (EC), Germany (EC), Norway, Israel; 1993 - France, Austria, Israel, Switzerland, France, Bulgaria, Finland, Austria; 1994 - Wales, Nigeria

== USA ==
Player	Caps	Opponents
John Harkes	12	1992 - Republic of Ireland, Republic of Ireland, Portugal, Italy, Saudi Arabia; 1993 - Brazil, England, Germany, Jamaica (GC), Honduras (GC), Costa Rica (GC), Mexico (GC)
Oguchi Onyewu	1	2013 - Ukraine
Frank Simek	5	2007 - Guatemala, China, Trinidad & Tobago, El Salvador, Mexico

== Wales ==
Player	Caps	Opponents
Harry Hanford	4	1936 - Northern Ireland; 1937 - Scotland, England; 1939 - France
Ryan Jones	1	1994 - Estonia
Tommy Jones	2	1931 - Northern Ireland; 1933 - France
Mark Pembridge	17	1995 - Moldova, Germany, Albania; 1996 - Switzerland, San Marino, Faroe Islands, Holland, Holland, Turkey; 1997 - Republic of Ireland, Belgium, Scotland, Belgium, Brazil; 1998 - Jamaica, Malta, Tunisia
Peter Rodrigues	17	1970 - Romania; 1971 - Czechoslovakia, Scotland, England, Northern Ireland, Finland, Czechoslovakia, Romania; 1972 - England, Northern Ireland, England; 1973 - England, Poland, Scotland, England, Northern Ireland, Poland
Rees Williams	4	1923 - Scotland; 1925 - Scotland; 1927 - England, Northern Ireland
Doug Witcomb	1	1947 - Northern Ireland

== Yugoslavia ==
Player	Caps	Opponents
Darko Kovačević	4	1996 - Romania, Mexico, Japan, Malta
Dejan Stefanović	4	1996 - Romania, Japan; 1997 - Russia; 1998 - Argentina
