= Burkinshaw =

- Pronunciation: bur-kin-shaw

Origin
- Meaning: a grove of birch trees
- Region of origin: English-speaking countries

Burkinshaw may refer to:

== List of persons with the surname ==
- Donaldson & Burkinshaw, a law partnership in Singapore
- George Burkinshaw (1922–1982), English footballer
- Jack Burkinshaw (1890–1947), English footballer
- Keith Burkinshaw (born 1935), English footballer
- Laurie Burkinshaw (1893–1969), English footballer
- Ralph Burkinshaw (1898–1951), English footballer
- Ross Burkinshaw (born 1986), English boxer
