= Greensmith =

Greensmith is a surname, referring to a coppersmith. Notable people with the name include:

- Bill Greensmith (1930–2022), English cricketer
- Gus Greensmith (born 1996), British rally driver
- Harry Greensmith (1899–1967), Australian rules footballer
- Ron Greensmith (1933–2015), English footballer
