= Adrian Wall =

Adrian Wall may refer to:

- Adrian Wall (footballer), former Sheffield Wednesday player
- Adrian Wall (Doctor Who), Doctor Who character from the Bernice Summerfield stories

== See also ==
- Hadrian's Wall, a defensive fortification in Roman Britain
