= Marr Paterson =

Scottish footballer

Personal information
- Full name: Marr Paterson
- Date of birth: 1887
- Place of birth: Alva, Scotland
- Position: Forward

Senior career*
Years	Team	Apps	(Gls)
1908–1911	Leith Athletic	38	(15)
1911–1912	The Wednesday	21	(2)
1912–1914	Leith Athletic	38	(4)
1914–1915	Lochgelly United		
1920	Clackmannan		
	Leith Athletic	0	(0)
- * Club domestic league appearances and goals

Marr Paterson (born 1887) was a Scottish professional footballer who played as a forward for Leith Athletic and The Wednesday.

== Personal life ==
While a The Wednesday player, Paterson shared accommodation in Sheffield with teammate Jimmy Campbell. He worked for the British Government during the First World War.

== Career statistics ==
Appearances and goals by club, season and competition
Club	Season	League			National Cup		Total	
Club	Season	Division	Apps	Goals	Apps	Goals	Apps	Goals
Leith Athletic	1908–09	Scottish Second Division	7	0	1	0	8	0
Leith Athletic	1909–10	Scottish Second Division	19	9	10	0	29	9
Leith Athletic	1910–11	Scottish Second Division	12	6	11	1	33	7
Leith Athletic	Total		38	15	22	1	60	16
The Wednesday	1910–11	First Division	14	2	0	0	14	2
The Wednesday	1911–12	First Division	7	0	0	0	7	0
The Wednesday	Total		21	2	0	0	21	2
Leith Athletic	1912–13	Scottish Second Division	24	4	2	0	26	4
Leith Athletic	1913–14	Scottish Second Division	14	0	7	0	21	0
Leith Athletic	Leith Athletic total		76	19	31	1	107	20
Career total			97	21	31	1	128	22
