= List of Peterborough United F.C. players =

This is a list of notable footballers who have played for Peterborough United. The aim is for this list to include all players that have played 100 or more senior matches for the club. Other players who are deemed to have played an important role for the club can also be included, but the reason for their assumed notability should be indicated in the 'Notes' column.

For a list of all Peterborough United players with a Wikipedia article, see Category:Peterborough United F.C. players, and for the current squad see Peterborough United F.C.#Current squad.

== Explanation of List ==
Players should be listed in chronological order according to the year in which they first played for the club, and then by alphabetical order of their surname. Appearances and goals should include substitute appearances, but exclude wartime matches. Further information on competitions/seasons which are regarded as eligible for appearance stats are provided below, and if a player's data is not available for any of these competitions an appropriate note should be added to the table.

=== League appearances ===
League appearances and goals should include data for the following league spells, but should not include play-off matches:

- Midland League: 1934–35 to 1959–60
- Football League: 1960-61 to present

=== Total appearances ===
The figures for total appearances and goals should include the League figures together with the following competitions:

- Play-off matches (1991–92, 1999-00, 2010–11)
- FA Cup
- Football League Cup; Football League Trophy (1983–84 to 1991–92, 1994–95 to 2008–09, 2010–11); Anglo-Italian Cup (1992–93, 1993–94)
- Football League Group Cup/Trophy (1981–82, 1982–83), Watney Cup (1970–71, 1972–73, 1973–74)

== List of players ==
Name	Position	Club career	League apps	League goals	Total apps	Total goals	Ref / Notes	
Peter McNamee	FW	1954-1966	303	113	344	126	?	?
Terry Bly	FW	1960–1962	88	81	101	87		
Ollie Conmy	MF	1964–1972	263	34	?	?	First to be capped while playing for Peterborough	
Jim Hall	FW	1967–1975	302	122	?	?	Record Peterborough League goalscorer	
Frank Noble	DF	1967?–1972?	207	1	?	?		
John Wile	DF	1967–1970, 1983–1986	205	10	?	?	Player-manager of Peterborough 1983-1986	
Jim Iley	WH	1969–1972	68	4	?	?	Player-manager of Peterborough 1969-1972	
Tommy Robson	WN	1969–1981	482	111	?	?	Record Peterborough appearances	
Chris Turner	DF	1969?–1978?	314	37	?	?	Manager of Peterborough 1991-1992	
Jack Carmichael	DF	1971–1980, 1982–1983	358	5	?	?		
Mick Jones	DF	1973?–1976?	88	4	?	?	Manager of Peterborough 1988-1989	
Eric Steele	GK	1973?–1977?	124	0	148	?	Most consecutive appearances for Peterborough (148)	
Keith Waugh	GK	1976?–1981	195	0	?	?		
Alan Slough	MF	1977–1981	105	10	?	?		
Steve Collins	DF	1978?–1983?, 1986?–1989?	216	3	?	?		
Peter Morris	MF	1979	1	0	?	?	Manager of Peterborough 1979–1982	
Lil Fuccillo	MF	1985–1987	82	3	?	?	Manager of Peterborough 1992-1993	
Noel Luke	MF	1986?–1993	277	27	?	?		
Mick Halsall	MF	1987–1993	249	29	?	?		
Worrell Sterling	MF	1987–1993	193	29	236	39		
Ken Charlery	FW	1991–1992, 1993–1995, 1996–1997	171	55	218	80		
Mark Tyler	GK	1994–2009 2016-2021	416	0	483	0		
Andy Edwards	DF	1996—2003	267	10	310	13		
Steve Castle	MF	1997–2000	105	17	125	20		
Simon Davies	MF	1997–1999	65	6	75	6	Former record transfer fee received (£700,000)	
David Farrell	MF	1997–2006	337	42	388	52		
Leon McKenzie	FW	1998, 2000–2003	104	54	118	58		
Simon Rea	DF	1999–2005	159	8	181	8		
Adam Newton	DF/MF	2002–2008	218	8	247	9		
Jamie Day	DF	2003–2010	102	5	118	5		
Aaron McLean	FW	2006–2011, 2014–2015	157	70	187	83	Former record transfer fee received (£1.3m)	
Craig Morgan	DF	2006–2010	125	4	144	4		
George Boyd	MF	2007-2013; 2019-2020	285	64	322	76		
Charlie Lee	DF/MF	2007–2011	153	14	177	16		
Craig Mackail-Smith	FW	2007–2011, 2014, 2017	185	80	212	99	transfer fee received (£2.5m)	
Chris Whelpdale	MF	2007–2011	124	12	142	13		
Joe Lewis	GK	2008–2012	168	0	190	0		
Ryan Bennett	DF	2009–2012	88	6	100	7		
Lee Frecklington	MF	2009–2013	93	8	102	10		
Tommy Rowe	MF	2009–2014	175	23	199	27		
Gabriel Zakuani	DF	2009–2016	226	9	252	10		
Mark Little	DF	2010–2014	157	3	185	4		
Grant McCann	MF	2010–2015	160	29	186	35	Manager of Peterborough 2015, 2016–2018, 2022–2023	
Lee Tomlin	FW	2010–2014	135	32	156	43		
Craig Alcock	DF	2011–2014	96	0	112	0		
Joe Newell	MF	2011–2015	96	3	109	4		
Paul Taylor	FW	2011–2012, 2013, 2016–2017	93	15	107	18		
Michael Bostwick	MF	2012–2017	193	23	228	23		
Jonson Clarke-Harris	FW	2012–2013, 2020–2024	166	78	190	87		
Dwight Gayle	FW	2012–2013	29	13	29	13	Record transfer fee received (£7m)	
Bobby Olejnik	GK	2012–2015	88	0	106	0		
Britt Assombalonga	FW	2013–2014	43	23	58	33	Record transfer fee paid (Exceeding £1.1m)	
Jack Payne	MF	2013–2016	89	5	105	6		
Jack Baldwin	DF	2014–2018	100	4	118	5		
Marcus Maddison	MF	2014–2020	212	52	249	62		
Michael Smith	DF	2014–2017	120	3	133	3		
Chris Forrester	MF	2015–2018	107	6	129	6		
Andrew Hughes	DF	2016–2018	82	3	102	4		
Ryan Tafazolli	DF	2016–2019	101	5	131	7		
Jack Marriott	FW	2017–2018, 2021–2023	93	40	114	49		
Siriki Dembélé	FW	2018–2022	129	26	148	31		
Ivan Toney	FW	2018–2020	76	40	94	49	Record transfer fee received (£5m rising to £10m)	
Joe Ward	FW	2018–2023	202	18	232	23		
Mark Beevers	DF	2019–2022	91	0	101	0		
Harrison Burrows	DF	2019–2024	148	14	185	20		
Dan Butler	DF	2019–2023	120	3	135	3		
Ricky-Jade Jones	FW	2019–2025	159	24	203	42		
Frankie Kent	DF	2019–2023	149	4	170	5		
Josh Knight	DF	2019, 2019–2020, 2021–2024	141	9	169	11		
Nathan Thompson	DF	2019–2023	115	4	131	4		
Ronnie Edwards	DF	2020–2024	121	1	143	1		
Jack Taylor	MF	2020–2023	125	17	138	22		
Kwame Poku	MF	2021–2025	121	27	147	30		
Joel Randall	FW	2021–2025	82	15	109	19		
Hector Kyprianou	MF	2022–2024	117	14	140	16		
Ephron Mason-Clark	FW	2022–2024	84	23	100	29		
Archie Collins	MF	2023–2026	129	6	159	8		
