= Teddy Davison =

English footballer and manager

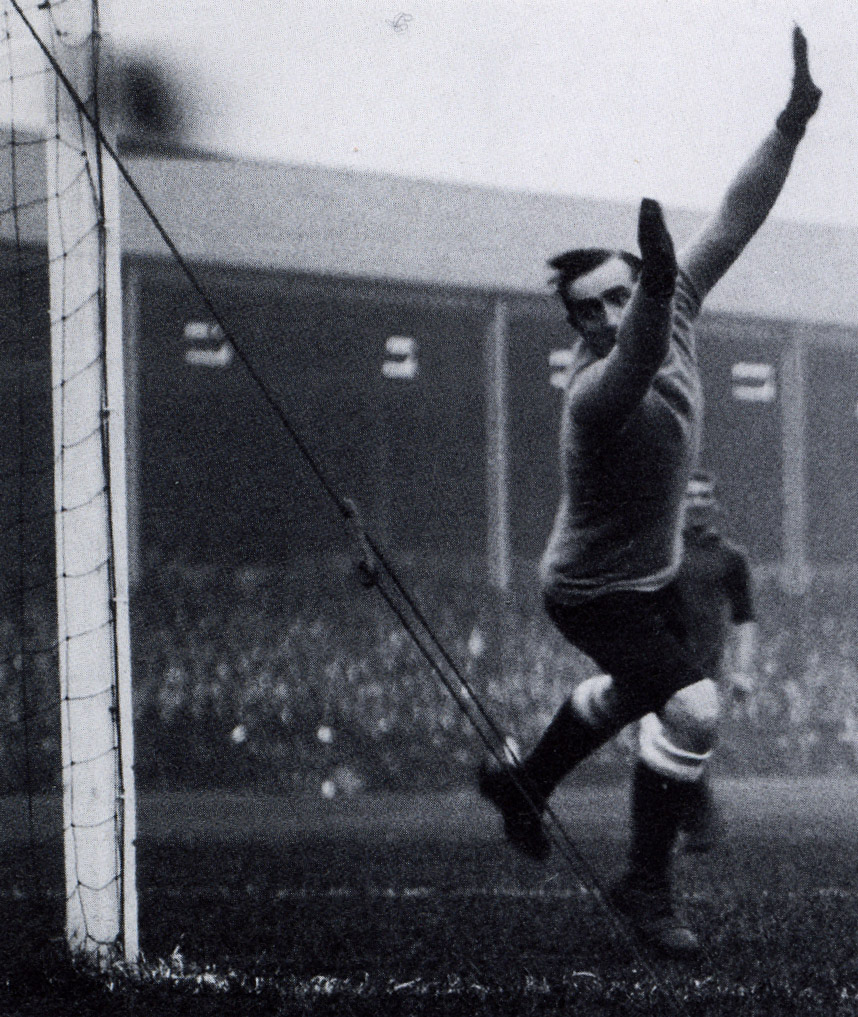
- Davison saves from Billy Lacey on 4 October 1913 in a 4–1 Wednesday victory over Liverpool

Personal information
- Full name: John Edward Davison
- Date of birth: 2 September 1887
- Place of birth: Gateshead, England
- Date of death: 1 February 1971 (aged 83)
- Place of death: Sheffield, England
- Height: 5 ft 7 in (1.70 m)
- Position: Goalkeeper

Youth career
- 1903–1908: Gateshead St. Chad's

Senior career*
Years	Team	Apps	(Gls)
1908–1926	The Wednesday	397	(0)
1926–1927	Mansfield Town	0	(0)
Total		397	(0)

International career
1922	England	1	(0)

Managerial career
- 1926–1928: Mansfield Town (player-manager)
- 1928–1932: Chesterfield
- 1932–1952: Sheffield United
- 1952–1958: Chesterfield
- * Club domestic league appearances and goals

John Edward Davison (2 September 1887 – 1 February 1971) was an English footballer and manager who had a long and successful association with the football clubs of Sheffield, playing for The Wednesday for 18 years and later managing Sheffield United for 20 years. His fairness and diplomacy earned him the nicknames of "The George Washington of Sheffield football" and "Honest Ted". Davison played as a goalkeeper in a career which lasted between 1908 and 1926, making 424 appearances in all competitions for The Wednesday, his only league club. Davison was only 5 ft 7 in (1.70 m) tall, very small for a goalkeeper, but he made up for this with lightning reflexes and top class anticipation. He has gone down in football records as the smallest goalkeeper ever to play for England, making just one appearance for the national team in March 1922.

== Playing career ==
Davison was born in Gateshead, County Durham, the seventh of nine children. On leaving school he worked as a typesetter for a Newcastle newspaper and played football for Gateshead St. Chad's, where he was spotted by The Wednesday's assistant manager Robert Brown who invited him to Hillsborough for a trial. Davison impressed in the trial, saving a penalty in a practice match and was signed in April 1908 as understudy to long standing Wednesday keeper Jack Lyall for a fee of £300.

=== Sheffield Wednesday ===
The 21-year-old Davison made his Wednesday debut on 10 October 1908, however he only made eight appearances in that first season, being unable to dislodge Lyall. The summer of 1909 saw Lyall leave for Manchester City and Davison became first choice keeper for the 1909–10 season. Davison was to remain first choice for the next 12 seasons, a remarkable achievement bearing in mind that he lost four years of his career to World War I when professionial football was suspended. Throughout his career Davison kept a record of every match he played in, this showed he played in 618 games, conceding 810 goals, it also revealed he was a specialist at saving penalties, saving 24 out of 77 faced.

Davison volunteered for the army during World War I and was sent to France in July 1916, serving with the Royal Field Artillery for the rest of the war. He did make two wartime appearances for Wednesday when he was home on leave. He returned safely from the war to make 20 appearances in the 1919–20 season as Wednesday were relegated from the First Division, sharing goalkeeping duties with Arnold Birch. Davison became first choice keeper again the following season.

He was called up to the England team to face Wales on 13 March 1922 in the British Home Championship at Anfield and kept a clean sheet in a 1–0 win. He was also picked eight times for Sheffield's representative side and toured Australia with the FA in 1925. Davison remained first choice keeper until the 1924–25 season when Jack Brown threatened and eventually took over his place in the team. The 38-year-old Davison failed to make an appearance in Wednesday's Second Division championship winning side in 1925–26 and his days at Hillsborough were coming to an end.

== Management ==
=== Mansfield Town ===
In June 1926 he accepted the offer to become player/manager/secretary of Mansfield Town who at that time were a non-league side playing in the Midland League. In his first season in charge Mansfield had a good season winning the Notts Senior Cup, he impressed as a manager with the way he went about his business and getting the team to play attacking football. He continued playing until January 1927 when a broken rib in a game against Newark Town forced him to end his playing career. Davidson's management style had impressed near neighbours Chesterfield and when they were looking for a replacement for Alec Campbell they approached Davison directly.

=== Chesterfield ===
Davison was appointed Chesterfield manager on 2 January 1928 at a wage of £6 a week. He immediately reorganised the club, making clear divisions between the administrative and playing sides, and bringing in experienced players such as Sid Binks. An improvement in results followed culminating in winning the Third Division North championship in 1930–31 with the team securing the championship on the last day of the season, scoring eight goals against Gateshead, Davison's home town club. Davison consolidated Chesterfield's position in the Second Division the following season, continuing to bring in experienced players such as ex-England international George Ashmore. He also established a scouting network in his native north east to bring in young players. Davison had become one of the most talented and well organised managers around and it was no surprise when he was offered the newly created position of secretary/manager at Sheffield United in June 1932 as a replacement for the legendary John Nicholson, who had been killed in a traffic accident earlier in the year after being Blades secretary for 33 years.

=== Sheffield United ===
Davison's first season at United saw them finish a respectable 10th in the First Division, but the following season (1933–34) was a disaster as United were relegated for the first time in their history. The following season had The Blades in a mid-table finishing position in the Second Division, although Davison had made the excellent signing of Jock Dodds on a free transfer from Lincoln City. United reached the 1936 FA Cup Final losing to Arsenal 1–0, the cup run probably cost the team promotion as they finished three points behind runners up Charlton Athletic. United eventually returned to the First Division in the last full season before World War II, finishing runners up and denying rivals Wednesday by one point. That 1938–39 season is notable for Davison as he made the purchase of Jimmy Hagan for £2,500 in November 1938, probably his best ever signing.

Davison remained in charge at Bramall Lane throughout the war years, with the team winning the Football League North in 1945–46. The return to peace time football saw United relegated from the First Division in 1948–49 and then denied an immediate return the following season by city rivals Wednesday on goal average. Two mid table finishes and a failure to get a quick return to the First Division saw Davison resign as United manager in August 1952.

=== Return to Chesterfield ===
Davison was not out of a job for long as he was immediately offered his old job as manager of Chesterfield, who had just parted company with Bobby Marshall. Davison once again tried his formula of signing experienced players, with Dennis Westcott and Cyril Hatton arriving at Saltergate amongst others. He had to endure severe financial constraints with the club only being able to afford 14 full-time professionals. Despite this the team challenged for promotion, finishing sixth in the Third Division North four seasons in succession. Davison's youth policy also saw fruition when the youth team reached the final of the FA Youth Cup in 1956 with future World Cup winner Gordon Banks one of the stars. He was asked to manage the Third Division North side against the South in April 1957. Davison stepped down as Chesterfield manager in May 1958, at the age of 70, however he did continue to do some scouting for the club.

After finally retiring, Davison spent his latter years in Sheffield and died in February 1971 at the age of 83. His legacy is that he probably made the biggest individual impact on Sheffield football of any person in history.

== Managerial statistics ==
Managerial record by team and tenure
Team	From	To	Record				
Team	From	To	G	W	D	L	Win %
Mansfield Town	1926	1928	2	1	0	1	50.00
Chesterfield	1 August 1928	15 June 1932	179	84	29	66	46.93
Sheffield United	15 June 1932	30 June 1952	592	248	139	205	41.89
Chesterfield	30 June 1952	30 June 1958	287	133	61	93	46.34
Total			1,060	466	229	365	43.96
