= Bill Harvey (footballer, born 1920) =

English footballer and manager (1920–2002)

Personal information
- Date of birth: 1920
- Place of birth: Grimsby, England
- Date of death: 3 February 2002 (aged 81–82)

Youth career
- Grimsby Town

Senior career*
Years	Team	Apps	(Gls)
1937–1946	Grimsby Town	1	(0)
	Bourne Town	0	(0)

Managerial career
- 1962–1964: Luton Town
- 1968–1969: Grimsby Town
- * Club domestic league appearances and goals

William Harvey (1920 – 3 February 2002) was an English footballer, more notable as a manager than as a player, who managed Luton Town and Grimsby Town.

== Career ==
Harvey signed for his home town club Grimsby Town as a player before World War II, playing just once for the first team versus Sunderland (FA Cup Round 3 second leg, 9 January 1946) at outside right. After the end of hostilities, he decided to concentrate on coaching. His first managing appointment came in 1962, when he was made manager of Bedfordshire outfit Luton Town. In his first season Luton were relegated from Division Two, and Harvey resigned in November 1964. He returned to coaching, working at Swindon Town and Bristol City. Harvey returned to Grimsby in 1968, but with Harvey in charge the team were first relegated and then finished in the re-election spots of Division Four. Grimsby were re-elected to the Football League but Harvey resigned after a year in charge, and never managed again.

He was also a coach and caretaker manager at Peterborough United.
