= Harry Waites =

English football coach

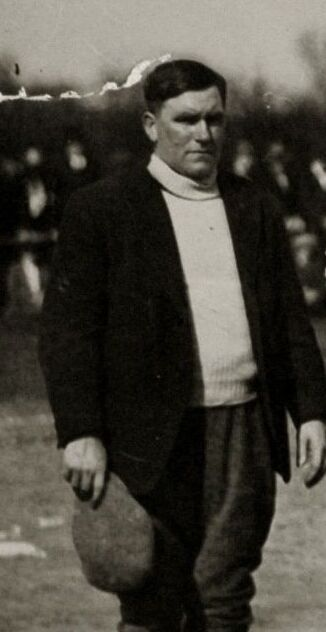
- Waites in 1920.

Personal information
- Date of birth: 8 June 1878
- Place of birth: Stockport
- Date of death: October 1938
- Place of death: Otley

Managerial career
- Years: Team
- 1919–1921: Be Quick
- 1921: Netherlands
- 1921–1924: LAC Frisia 1883
- 1924–1925: Feyenoord

Harry Waites, sometimes also called Jim Waites (8 June 1878 – October 1938), was an English football coach active in the Netherlands in the 1920s.

== Career ==
Waites, who was a rugby player in his youth, spent World War I in an open Prisoner-of-War camp in the Netherlands, alongside footballer Arnold Birch. After the war ended in 1918, Waites became a coach of Be Quick, winning the league title in 1920. Waites managed the Dutch national side in 1921, and later managed Dutch club side Feyenoord between 1924 and 1925 (national league championship 1924), before returning to England.
