= Jimmy Campbell (footballer, born 1886) =

Scottish footballer

Personal information
- Full name: James Campbell
- Date of birth: 26 March 1886
- Place of birth: Newhaven, Scotland
- Date of death: 25 May 1925 (aged 39)
- Place of death: Newhaven, Scotland
- Position: Left half

Senior career*
Years	Team	Apps	(Gls)
1908–1911	Leith Athletic	48	(1)
1911–1920	The Wednesday	144	(3)
1920–1921	Huddersfield Town	1	(0)
1921–1925	St Bernard's	99	(0)

International career
1913	Scotland	1	(0)
- * Club domestic league appearances and goals

James Campbell (26 March 1886 – 25 May 1925) was a Scottish professional footballer who played for The Wednesday, Huddersfield Town and St Bernard's as a left half. His only cap for Scotland came against Wales on 3 March 1913.

== Personal life ==
While a The Wednesday player, Campbell shared accommodation in Sheffield with teammate Marr Paterson. Prior to the First World War, Campbell was a reservist in the British Army and he served as a driver with the Royal Field Artillery during the opening year of the conflict. In July 1915, he was invalided to a hospital in Leicester, suffering with pleurisy. Deteriorating health after the war contributed to his retirement from football and death aged 39 in May 1925.

== Career statistics ==
Appearances and goals by club, season and competition
Club	Season	League			National Cup		Total	
Club	Season	Division	Apps	Goals	Apps	Goals	Apps	Goals
Leith Athletic	1908–09	Scottish Division Two	16	1	4	0	20	1
Leith Athletic	1909–10	Scottish Division Two	21	0	10	0	32	0
Leith Athletic	1910–11	Scottish Division Two	11	0	11	0	22	0
Leith Athletic	Total		48	1	25	0	73	1
The Wednesday	1910–11	First Division	13	1	0	0	13	1
The Wednesday	1911–12	First Division	38	0	2	0	40	0
The Wednesday	1912–13	First Division	38	0	4	0	42	0
The Wednesday	1913–14	First Division	32	1	5	0	37	1
The Wednesday	1919–20	First Division	23	1	2	0	25	1
The Wednesday	Total		144	3	13	0	157	3
Huddersfield Town	1920–21	First Division	1	0	0	0	1	0
St Bernard's	1921–22	Scottish Division Two	32	0	1	0	33	0
St Bernard's	1922–23	Scottish Division Two	37	0	3	0	40	0
St Bernard's	1923–24	Scottish Division Two	16	0	0	0	16	0
St Bernard's	1924–25	Scottish Division Two	14	0	0	0	14	0
St Bernard's	Total		99	0	4	0	103	0
Career total			292	4	42	0	334	4

== See also ==
- List of Sheffield Wednesday F.C. players
