= Jack Breedon =

English footballer and manager

Personal information
- Full name: John Norman Breedon
- Date of birth: 29 December 1907
- Place of birth: South Hiendley, England
- Date of death: 12 December 1967 (aged 59)
- Height: 5 ft 10 in (1.78 m)
- Position: Goalkeeper

Senior career*
| Years | Team | Apps | (Gls) |
| 1928–1930 | Barnsley | 8 | (0) |
| 1930–1935 | Sheffield Wednesday | 45 | (0) |
| 1935–1945 | Manchester United | 35 | (0) |
| 1945–1946 | Burnley | 0 | (0) |

Managerial career
- 1947–1950: Halifax Town
- 1955: Bradford Park Avenue
- * Club domestic league appearances and goals

John Norman Breedon (29 December 1907 – 12 December 1967) was an English footballer and manager. He played as a goalkeeper. Breedon was born in South Hiendley in the West Riding of Yorkshire, and played for Barnsley, Sheffield Wednesday, Manchester United and Burnley. He also appeared as a wartime guest for Bolton Wanderers, Manchester City, and Rochdale during the Second World War. After retiring from playing in 1946, Breedon had spells as manager at both Halifax Town and Bradford Park Avenue).

== Playing career ==
Breedon worked as a miner while playing amateur football for his village club in South Hiendley before turning professional when he signed for Football League Second Division side Barnsley in September 1928. After making eight league appearances in just over two seasons at Oakwell, he transferred to First Division outfit Sheffield Wednesday in November 1930. Breedon never established himself as first-choice goalkeeper during his time with the Hillsborough club and was predominantly a backup to England international Jack Brown. In total, he played 45 league matches for Wednesday in five seasons before moving to Manchester United in the summer of 1935.

Breedon made his debut for Manchester United in the 1–3 defeat away at Plymouth Argyle on the opening day of the 1935–36 campaign. He was dropped for the following match in favour of Jack Hall, who went on to keep his place for most of the remaining season as the team were crowned Second Division champions. Following the departure of Hall in 1936, Breedon was unable to capitalise as new signing Tommy Breen was installed as first-choice goalkeeper. Breedon made 13 league appearances in total during his first three years at Old Trafford, but became more involved in the first team during the 1938–39 season as United achieved a 14th-place finish in the First Division. He had retained his place in the side for the beginning of the following campaign, appearing in the opening three games, but the season was abandoned following the outbreak of the Second World War and the records were expunged.

During the war Breedon assisted several teams as a wartime guest player, including Rochdale, Manchester City and Bolton Wanderers. He also played regularly for Manchester United in wartime competitions, but left the club in October 1945 following the emergence of young goalkeeper Jack Crompton. He subsequently signed for Burnley and made his debut for the Turf Moor side in the 2–1 FA Cup win over Stoke City on 7 January 1946. However, it proved to be his only appearance for Burnley as he was unable to dislodge fellow new signing Jimmy Strong from the starting line-up. Strong went on to become first-choice for the next eight years, playing more than 280 matches for the club. Breedon was released by Burnley in May 1946 and retired from professional football aged 38.

== Coaching career ==
Following his retirement from playing, Breedon was offered the manager's job at New Brighton but declined the position. In August 1947, he was appointed manager of Third Division North club Halifax Town to replace James Thompson. He spent three years in charge of the Yorkshire side; during this time the team never finished higher than 19th in the division. After leaving Halifax in 1950, Breedon worked as a scout for Bradford City for several years. He was appointed manager of rivals Bradford Park Avenue in January 1955 but his tenure was brief and he left the club nine months later. This proved to be Breedon's last managerial post as he ended his career with a spell as a scout for Leeds United.
