= Jimmy Murray (footballer, born 1884) =

Northern Irish footballer

James Murray
Personal information
- Full name: James Murray
- Date of birth: 14 March 1884
- Place of birth: Kilmacrenan, Ireland
- Position: Centre forward

Senior career*
Years	Team	Apps	(Gls)
- Shettleston
–	Derry Celtic		
1904–1906	Distillery		
1906–1909	Shettleston		
1909–1910	Motherwell	22	(19)
1910–1911	Sheffield Wednesday	13	(4)
1911–1912	Derry Celtic		
1912	Motherwell	0	(0)

International career
1905	Irish League XI	1	(0)
1910	Ireland	3	(0)
- * Club domestic league appearances and goals

James Murray (born 14 March 1884) was an Irish footballer who played for, among others, Sheffield Wednesday.

Murray spent part of his early life living in Glasgow, where he played at the Junior level with Shettleston. When he went back to Ireland, he had success with Distillery, winning the Irish Cup in 1905 and the Irish League the following year, as well as being selected for its representative team. He returned to Scotland and continued playing for Shettleston until 1909 when he was given an opportunity at senior level by Motherwell who were looking to reinforce their forward line following the departure of Jimmy Stewart who had joined Liverpool.

Murray made a quick impact at Fir Park, scoring at the rate of almost a goal per game in the Scottish Football League Division One; in early 1910 this form earned him selection for Ireland for the British Home Championship, in the process becoming Motherwell's first international player. He soon signed for The Wednesday, with the Sheffield club also recruiting teammate George Robertson, a winger credited with providing many of the opportunities from which Murray had scored (and who had gained his and Motherwell's first Scotland cap in the same period). However, while Robertson settled at Wednesday and remained with the Owls for several years, Murray did not secure a regular place and moved back to Ireland by 1911, turning out for Derry Celtic where he had also played before joining Distillery. He had another short spell with Motherwell, but this time made no impression and is not recorded as having made any first-team appearances in the two major competitions.

== Honours ==
Distillery

- Irish League: 1905–06
- Irish Cup: 1904–05
