= Norman Rigby =

English footballer and manager (1923–2001)

Personal information
- Full name: Norman Rigby
- Date of birth: 23 May 1923
- Place of birth: Warsop, England
- Date of death: 21 August 2001 (aged 78)
- Place of death: Newark-on-Trent, England
- Positions: Centre half; left back

Senior career*
Years	Team	Apps	(Gls)
	Ransome & Marles	0	(0)
–1944	Newark Town	0	(0)
1944–1951	Notts County	46	(0)
1951–1962	Peterborough United	382	(1)
1962–1964	Boston United		

Managerial career
- 1967–1969: Peterborough United
- March Town United
- Bourne Town
- 1972–1978: Stamford
- * Club domestic league appearances and goals

Norman Rigby (23 May 1923 – 21 August 2001) was an English professional footballer who made over 430 appearances as a centre half for Peterborough United. Rigby is a member of the club's Hall of Fame and in a Football League 125th anniversary poll was voted by the Peterborough United supporters as the club's fifth best-ever captain. He later managed Peterborough United and in non-League football.

== Career statistics ==
Appearances and goals by club, season and competition
Club	Season	League			FA Cup		League Cup		Other		Total	
Club	Season	Division	Apps	Goals	Apps	Goals	Apps	Goals	Apps	Goals	Apps	Goals
Notts County	1947–48	Third Division South	1	0	0	0	—		—		1	0
Notts County	1948–49	Third Division South	5	0	0	0	—		—		5	0
Notts County	1949–50	Third Division South	36	0	0	0	—		—		36	0
Notts County	1950–51	Second Division	4	0	0	0	—		—		4	0
Notts County	Total		46	0	0	0	—		—		46	0
Peterborough United	1951–52	Midland League	41	1	2	0	—		—		43	1
Peterborough United	1952–53	Midland League	37	0	8	3	—		2 (Note: Appearances in Huntingdonshire Premier Cup)	0	47	3
Peterborough United	1953–54	Midland League	43	0	4	0	—		1 (Note: Appearances in Maunsell Cup)	0	48	0
Peterborough United	1954–55	Midland League	43	0	1	0	—		—		44	0
Peterborough United	1955–56	Midland League	40	0	4	0	—		1 (Note: Appearance in Bancroft Cup)	0	45	0
Peterborough United	1956–57	Midland League	43	0	6	0	—		2	0	51	0
Peterborough United	1957–58	Midland League	18	0	3	0	—		2	0	23	0
Peterborough United	1958–59	Midland League	34	0	6	0	—		1 (Note: Appearance in East Anglian Cup)	0	41	0
Peterborough United	1959–60	Midland League	30	0	5	0	—		1	0	36	0
Peterborough United	1960–61	Fourth Division	39	0	2	0	1	0	1 (Note: Appearance in Northamptonshire Senior Cup)	0	43	0
Peterborough United	1961–62	Third Division	14	0	0	0	0	0	1	0	15	0
Peterborough United	Total		382	1	41	3	1	0	12	0	436	4
Career Total			382	1	41	3	1	0	12	0	436	4

== Honours ==
=== As a player ===
Notts County

- Football League Third Division South: 1949–50

Peterborough United

- Football League Fourth Division: 1960–61
- Midland League: 1955–56, 1956–57, 1957–58, 1958–59, 1959–60

=== As a manager ===
Stamford

- United Counties League Premier Division: 1975–76, 1977–78
- United Counties League Cup: 1975–76

=== As an individual ===
- Peterborough United Hall of Fame
