= Billy Crinson =

English footballer (1883–1951)

Personal information
- Full name: William James Crinson
- Date of birth: 26 July 1883
- Place of birth: Sunderland, England
- Date of death: 31 January 1951 (aged 67)
- Place of death: Sunderland, England
- Height: 6 ft 0 in (1.83 m)
- Position: Goalkeeper

Senior career*
Years	Team	Apps	(Gls)
–1904	Seaham Albion		
1904–1906	Southwick		
1906–1908	The Wednesday	4	(0)
1908–1909	Huddersfield Town		
1909–1913	Brighton & Hove Albion	5	(0)
1913–1915	Sunderland Rovers		
- * Club domestic league appearances and goals

William James Crinson (26 July 1883 – 31 January 1951) was an English professional footballer who played as a goalkeeper in the Football League for The Wednesday. He also played non-League football for clubs including Seaham Albion, Southwick, Huddersfield Town, Brighton & Hove Albion and Sunderland Rovers.

== Life and career ==
Crinson was born in 1883 in Sunderland, which was then in County Durham, to Robert Crinson, an iron ship plater, and his wife Ophelia. As of the 1901 Census, the family were living in the Monkwearmouth area and the 17-year-old Crinson was an apprentice in the shipyards. Crinson married Mary Angus in 1902. The 1911 Census shows him as a professional footballer living in Steyning, Sussex, and the father of five children.

He played Wearside League football for Seaham Albion and Southwick before signing for The Wednesday in 1906 as backup for Jack Lyall. Crinson made his Football League debut on 5 January 1907, standing in for Lyall who had been kicked on the arm in the previous match. He kept a clean sheet as Wednesday won 1–0 away at Manchester City and, according to the Yorkshire Telegraph and Star, "but for a first-class display in goal by young Crinson Wednesday would scarcely have come back home with both points." Lyall returned for the next match, and Crinson made three more appearances in the First Division in the following season, at the end of which he was allowed to leave.

He spent a season in the North-Eastern League with the newly formed Huddersfield Town club before joining Brighton & Hove Albion of the Southern League. As at Wednesday, Albion used him mainly as backup, in this case to Bob Whiting – Crinson signed for Albion in 1909 but did not make his first Southern League appearance for another three years. He made 13 appearances for the first team in all before returning to the north east of England, where he signed for North-Eastern League club Sunderland Rovers in September 1913.

After the First World War, Crinson acted as secretary of Wearside League club Sunderland Comrades, and scouted on behalf of Brighton & Hove Albion. The 1939 Register records him living with his wife and three children in Givens Street, Sunderland, and working as a plater in a shipyard. He was still resident at that address when he died in hospital in 1951 at the age of 67.
