= Trevor Pearson =

English footballer

Personal information
- Date of birth: 4 April 1952 (age 74)
- Place of birth: Sheffield, England
- Position: Goalkeeper

Senior career*
Years	Team	Apps	(Gls)
- Kiveton Park
1972–1974	Sheffield Wednesday	4	(0)
- Kiveton Park
- * Club domestic league appearances and goals

Trevor Pearson (born 4 April 1952) is an English footballer who played for Sheffield Wednesday.
