= Bill Hemmingfield =

English footballer

Personal information
- Full name: William Edmund Hemmingfield
- Date of birth: August 1875
- Place of birth: Eccleshall, Sheffield, England
- Date of death: 11 June 1953 (aged 77)
- Place of death: Cleethorpes, England
- Positions: Centre forward; defender

Senior career*
| Years | Team | Apps | (Gls) |
| ?−1898 | Mexborough Town | | |
| 1898−1899 | Sheffield Wednesday | | (8) |
| 1899−1903 | Grimsby Town | 101 | |
| 1903−1907 | Sheffield Wednesday | 25 | |
- * Club domestic league appearances and goals

William Edmund Hemmingfield was an English footballer who played for Sheffield Wednesday (two spells) and Grimsby Town. He started his career as a centre forward before switching to defence.

Hemmingfield was born in Ecclesfield, Sheffield in August 1875 and played as an amateur for Mexborough Town before joining Sheffield Wednesday for the 1898–99 season. He scored for Wednesday on his debut against Nottingham Forest on 10 September 1898 and ended that season as top scorer for the club with eight goals. However, Wednesday were relegated from Division One at the end of that season and Hemmingfield joined Grimsby Town for the following campaign.

Hemmingfield made 101 appearances for Grimsby in his three seasons with them, he won a Second Division championship medal in 1901–02. Hemmingfield returned to Sheffield Wednesday in August 1903 for a fee of £75, however he failed to become a regular in the team which were First Division champions in 1903-04 and made only 25 appearances in four seasons.

He retired in May 1907 and became coach at Grimsby Town. He returned to Sheffield Wednesday as a coach between June 1928 and May 1931. He lived the rest of his life in the Grimsby area and died in Cleethorpes on 11 June 1953.
