= Tommy Walker (footballer, born 1903) =

Scottish footballer

Personal information
- Full name: Thomas Walker
- Date of birth: 1903
- Place of birth: Cross Colls, Scotland
- Position: Right back

Senior career*
Years	Team	Apps	(Gls)
- Vale of Grange
1924–1926	Bradford City	54	(4)
1926–1935	Sheffield Wednesday	258	(3)
Total		312	(7)
- * Club domestic league appearances and goals

Thomas Walker (born 1903) was a Scottish professional footballer who played as a right back.

== Career ==
Born in Cross Colls, Walker played for Vale of Grange, Bradford City and Sheffield Wednesday. For Bradford City, he made 54 appearances in the Football League; he also made 4 FA Cup appearances. For Sheffield Wednesday, he made 258 appearances in the Football League; he also made 29 FA Cup appearances. He played in Sheffield Wednesday's 2–1 defeat by Arsenal in the Charity Shield at Stamford Bridge in October 1930.

== Sources ==
- Frost, Terry (1988). Bradford City A Complete Record 1903-1988. Breedon Books Sport. ISBN 0-907969-38-0.
