= Harry Greensmith =

Australian rules footballer

Personal information
- Full name: Harry Greensmith
- Born: 26 December 1899
- Died: 28 October 1967 (aged 67)

Playing career^{1}
Years	Club	Games (Goals)
1925	North Melbourne	2 (0)
- ^{1} Playing statistics correct to the end of 1925.

Harry Greensmith (26 December 1899 – 28 October 1967) was an Australian rules footballer who played with North Melbourne in the Victorian Football League (VFL).
