= Walter Eaton =

English footballer

Personal information
- Full name: Walter Eaton
- Date of birth: 1881
- Place of birth: Sheffield, England
- Date of death: 15 May 1917 (aged 35)
- Place of death: Pas-de-Calais, France
- Position: Right back

Senior career*
Years	Team	Apps	(Gls)
1904	The Wednesday	1	(0)
- Rotherham County
- Rotherham Town
- * Club domestic league appearances and goals

Walter Eaton (1881 – 15 May 1917) was an English professional football right back who played in the Football League for The Wednesday.

== Personal life ==
Eaton served as a private in the York and Lancaster Regiment and the Royal Northumberland Fusiliers during the First World War and died of wounds in France on 15 May 1917. He was buried in Étaples Military Cemetery.

== Career statistics ==
Appearances and goals by club, season and competition
Club	Season	League			FA Cup		Total	
Club	Season	Division	Apps	Goals	Apps	Goals	Apps	Goals
The Wednesday	1904–05	First Division	1	0	0	0	1	0
Career total			1	0	0	0	1	0
