= Chas Binney =

English footballer

Personal information
- Full name: Charles Binney
- Date of birth: 24 February 1901
- Place of birth: Sheffield, England
- Date of death: 1952 (aged 50–51)
- Position: Inside forward

Senior career*
Years	Team	Apps	(Gls)
1918–1919	Leadmill St Mary's		
1919–1923	The Wednesday	41	(6)
1923–1926	Worksop Town		
1926	Wombwell		
1927	Frickley Colliery		
Total		41	(6)
- * Club domestic league appearances and goals

Charles Binney (24 February 1901 – 1952) was an English footballer who played in the Football League for The Wednesday.
