= Andy Burgin =

English footballer

Personal information
- Date of birth: 6 March 1947 (age 79)
- Place of birth: Sheffield, England

Senior career*
Years	Team	Apps	(Gls)
1964–1965	Sheffield Wednesday	1	(0)
1967–1968	Rotherham United	10	(0)
1968	Detroit Cougars	27	(1)
1968–1974	Halifax Town	243	(0)
1974–1976	Blackburn Rovers	45	(1)
Total		326	(2)
- * Club domestic league appearances and goals

Andy Burgin (born 6 March 1947) is an English former professional footballer who played as a full back, making over 300 career appearances.

== Career ==
Born in Sheffield, Burgin played for Sheffield Wednesday, Rotherham United, Detroit Cougars, Halifax Town and Blackburn Rovers.
