= Donaldson & Burkinshaw =

Law partnership in Singapore

Donaldson & Burkinshaw LLP
- Headquarters: Singapore
- No. of offices: 2
- No. of lawyers: 30
- No. of employees: 85
- Major practice areas: See separate list
- Key people: Michelle S. H. Ng (Managing Partner); Lee Shy Tsong; Gooi Chi Duan; Eric Tin; E-Laine Chiam; Michael S. Kraal; Koay Min Pin
- Date founded: 6 November 1874; 151 years ago 3 January 2014; 12 years ago (as LLP)
- Founder: Alexander Muirhead Aitken; Alexander Leathes Donaldson; John Burkinshaw
- Company type: Limited Liability Partnership
- Website: www.donburk.asia

Donaldson & Burkinshaw is one of the oldest independent law partnerships in Singapore. It was established on 6 November 1874. Today, the firm is a medium-sized, full-service law practice.

== History ==
=== The founders ===
Two of the Firm's Founders

The firm's founders, Alexander Muirhead Aitken, Alexander Leathes Donaldson and John Burkinshaw, were British expatriates who had come to Singapore in the 19th century when the island was a British Crown Colony.

At the time, the development of Singapore Colony’s legal profession, jurisprudence and public life was still in its early stages. The Colony's population then consisted mainly of native Malays, and Chinese and Indian immigrants, who worked as fishermen, rubber-tappers, merchants, coolies, warehouse and port workers, and labourers.

The founders were acknowledged as outstanding members of the legal profession, as stated in the book One Hundred Years of Singapore, which was commissioned by the Singapore Centenary Committee on the Settlement's centenary.

When the first local Bar Committee was formed in 1875 to assist the Attorney-General in looking into matters affecting the local profession and practice etiquette, Alexander Leathes Donaldson was one of only three persons invited to sit on the Committee. Subsequently, in 1907, the Bar Committee was made a statutory body by the Courts Ordinance, providing the genesis for the modern Law Society of Singapore.

=== The Jeddah, 1881 ===
The Jeddah was a high-profile admiralty suit involving the abandonment of a steamship, the S.S. Jeddah, by her captain and crew. At the time of her abandonment, the S.S. Jeddah was carrying about 778 men, 147 women, and 67 children on board, in addition to considerable cargoes. Alexander Leathes Donaldson and John Burkinshaw both acted for the salvor, the S.S. Antenor.

The abandonment, salvage of, and subsequent litigation surrounding the S.S. Jeddah would later inspire Joseph Conrad's epic novel, Lord Jim.

=== The Second World War ===
Mercantile Bank Building, where Donaldson & Burkinshaw was situated from 1937 to 1978

By the time of the Second World War, the Firm acquired a list of banks, companies, and merchants in Singapore as its clientele. However, this practice was interrupted by the outbreak of hostilities, at which time the firm's documents and deeds were preserved at the Singapore Supreme Court. An account of the events can be found in a memoir, ‘Fifty Years with Donaldson & Burkinshaw', by Mr. Norman Sylvester Hogan, an administrator who served the firm for 50 years and retired in 1970.

=== The post-war years, to the 1970s ===
After the war, the firm continued to dominate the local legal arena as one of Singapore's top law firms. Its leaders continued to wield considerable influence in the early politico-legal developments of modern Singapore. When the 1954 Constitutional Commission of Singapore (better known as the Rendel Commission) was appointed by Governor Sir John Nicoll in July 1953 to undertake a comprehensive review of the constitution of the Colony, Mr. C F Smith, a senior partner of the firm, was one of the commission's non-official members.

Following the independence of Singapore from British Rule, the firm maintained offices in Malaysia at Johor and Kuala Lumpur, and in Sabah at Jesselton (now known as Kota Kinabalu) and Sandakan until the Promulgation of the Emergency (Essential Powers) Ordinance No. 30 of 1970. During this time, lawyers who were neither citizens nor permanent residents were barred from practicing in West Malaysia.

In the 1960s and 1970s, the Firm continued to attract and retain significant legal talent. Its senior partners Antony Purdon Godwin and Wu Chang-Sheng became prominent figures at the Singapore Litigation Bar. Wu Chang-Sheng, son of renowned plague-fighter Dr. Wu Lien-teh, was known for his expertise in construction arbitration. Godwin and Wu were also founding members of the Council of the Singapore Advocates and Solicitors Society (which subsequently became the Law Society of Singapore) in 1967. Henry Mosley Dyne, also a former senior partner, was regarded as a giant in the Chancery Bar until his retirement in 2000.

=== From the 1980s to the present ===
The firm has steadily grown and expanded its areas of practice over the years in step with the development of Singapore from a Crown Colony, to a part of the Federation of Malaysia, and later a sovereign nation.

Today, it carries on the practice of Advocates and Solicitors, Notaries Public, Commissioners for Oaths and Agents for Trade Marks, Patents & Designs. The firm and its partners have been profiled in the Asia-Pacific Legal 500, Chambers Asia, Asia Law Profile, Who’s Who Legal, Managing Intellectual Property Magazine, and Asian Legal Business. The firm also operates Donaldson & Burkinshaw (I.P.) Sdn. Bhd. in Kuala Lumpur, Malaysia, which handles Malaysian intellectual property matters.

The firm maintains memberships with leading global, regional and local professional organizations such as the International Trademark Association (INTA), the Asian Patent Attorneys Association (APAA), the Pharmaceutical Trade Marks Group (PTMG), the International Association for the Protection of Intellectual Property (AIPPI) and the Association of Singapore Patent Agents (ASPA). As a full-service law practice, the firm undertakes a wide range of legal work across the spectrum and is noted for its expertise in the following areas:

- Intellectual property
- Litigation and dispute resolution
- Real estate and conveyancing

=== Intellectual property practice ===
The firm's intellectual property practice has the distinction of being one of the oldest such practices in Singapore, with a history stretching back over seven decades. When Singapore’s Trademark Registry was first set up in the late 1930s, the firm handled Singapore’s earliest trademark applications.

Today, the firm's services cover all aspects of IP ranging from searching, clearance (including risk management and regulatory compliance) and protection of trademarks, service marks, patents, and designs, to the enforcement of these intellectual property rights through litigation in civil and criminal courts. The firm also has its own patent agents who are engineers and scientists, doctorate degree holders, and other professionals with prior experience at the Intellectual Property Office of Singapore (IPOS).

=== Litigation and dispute resolution practice ===
Besides offering the full range of civil and criminal litigation services, the firm has a dedicated Medico-Legal Practice Group which caters to litigation of a medico-legal nature and acts for the world’s largest medical indemnifier.

=== Real estate and conveyancing practice ===
The firm acted for the Singapore Tourism Board and Sentosa Development Corporation in respect of the Integrated Resorts development projects at Marina Bay and Sentosa, and advised the Singapore Tourism Board on transactions concerning the Singapore Flyer, a giant observation wheel attraction located on the Marina Centre Promontory.
