= George Burkinshaw =

English footballer

Personal information
- Date of birth: 1 October 1922
- Place of birth: Barnsley, England
- Date of death: 1982 (aged 59–60)
- Position: Centre half

Youth career
- Woolley Colliery

Senior career*
Years	Team	Apps	(Gls)
1942–1946	Barnsley	0	(0)
1946–1947	Carlisle United	25	(0)
1947–1948	Barnsley	0	(0)
1948–1949	Bradford City	12	(0)
- Goole Town
Total		37	(0)
- * Club domestic league appearances and goals

George Burkinshaw (1 October 1922 – 1982) was an English professional footballer who played as a centre half.

== Career ==
Born in Barnsley, Burkinshaw played for Woolley Colliery, Barnsley, Carlisle United, Bradford City and Goole Town.
