= Hugh Dowd =

Northern Ireland footballer

Personal information
- Date of birth: 19 May 1951 (age 75)
- Place of birth: Lurgan, Northern Ireland
- Position: Defender

Senior career*
Years	Team	Apps	(Gls)
–1974	Glenavon		
1974–1979	Sheffield Wednesday	112	(0)
1979–1983	Doncaster Rovers	84	(3)

International career
1974	Northern Ireland	3	(0)
- * Club domestic league appearances and goals

Hugh Dowd (born 19 May 1951) was a Northern Irish former professional footballer.

Born in Lurgan, Dowd was an accomplished centre half, initially making his name as with hometown club Glenavon, graduating to become the final captain of Northern Ireland's Amateur side. At the end of the 1973–74 season, with his name linked with a transfer to either Luton Town or Glasgow Celtic, he was called up by the Northern Ireland FA for the first time, making his professional international debut in a Home Nations Championship game with Wales.

Dowd was 23 when he was signed by English Division Two side Sheffield Wednesday, and he made his debut in a League Cup tie on 20 August 1974. That season he made just one more appearance at Hillsborough, in the FA Cup, as Wednesday were relegated to Division Three. He did however win two further international caps that season, against Norway and Sweden, which were his last international caps.

Over subsequent seasons, Dowd began to establish himself in the first team at Hillsborough, but Wednesday remained in Division Three. He made his final appearance for the Sheffield team on 30 September 1978. In August 1979, Dowd joined Doncaster Rovers for £15,000. He captained Rovers to promotion from Division Four in 1981 before retiring from League football during the 1982–83 season as a result of a knee ligament injury.

== Sources ==
- Hugh Dowd at National-Football-Teams.com
