= Len Edwards =

Welsh footballer (1930–2024)

Personal information
- Full name: Leonard Owen Edwards
- Date of birth: 30 May 1930
- Place of birth: Wrexham, Wales
- Date of death: 15 October 2024 (aged 94)
- Place of death: Sheffield, England
- Position: Wing half

Senior career*
| Years | Team | Apps | (Gls) |
| 19??–1951 | Wrexham | 0 | (0) |
| 1951–1954 | Sheffield Wednesday | 2 | (0) |
| 1954–1955 | Brighton & Hove Albion | 6 | (0) |
| 1955–1957 | Crewe Alexandra | 40 | (0) |
- * Club domestic league appearances and goals

Leonard Owen Edwards (30 May 1930 – 15 October 2024) was a Welsh professional footballer who played as a wing half in the Football League for Sheffield Wednesday, Brighton & Hove Albion and Crewe Alexandra. He also played for Gainsborough and Macclesfield in his later career, but stopped playing due to injury. Edwards died in Sheffield on 15 October 2024, at the age of 94.
