= Ron Capewell =

English footballer

Personal information
- Full name: Ronald Capewell
- Date of birth: 26 July 1929
- Place of birth: Sheffield, England
- Date of death: 16 August 2016 (aged 87)
- Place of death: Sheffield, England
- Position: Goalkeeper

Senior career*
Years	Team	Apps	(Gls)
- Kiveton Park
1950–1954	Sheffield Wednesday	29	(0)
1954–195?	Hull City	1	(0)
195?–19??	King's Lynn		
1962–1963	Mossley		
- * Club domestic league appearances and goals

Ronald Capewell (26 July 1929 – 16 August 2016) was an English footballer who played in the Football League for Sheffield Wednesday and Hull City during the early 1950s. He also played non-league football for Kiveton Park and King's Lynn.

He spent the 1960-61 season at Hyde United, leaving in September, 1961. In the 1962–63 season he played seven times for Mossley.
