= Frank Bradshaw =

English footballer and manager (1884–1962)

Personal information
- Full name: Frank Bradshaw
- Date of birth: 31 May 1884
- Place of birth: Sheffield, England
- Date of death: 1962 (aged 77–78)
- Height: 5 ft 9 1/2 in (1.77 m)
- Positions: Forward; right back

Senior career*
Years	Team	Apps	(Gls)
1904–1910	Sheffield Wednesday	87	(37)
1910–1911	Northampton Town		
1911–1914	Everton	66	(19)
1914–1923	Arsenal	132	(14)
Total		285	(70)

International career
1908	England	1	(3)

Managerial career
- 1923–1924: Aberdare Athletic
- Taunton Town
- * Club domestic league appearances and goals

Frank Bradshaw (31 May 1884 – mid-1962) was an English professional footballer and football club manager. A versatile player, he started his professional career as a forward with Sheffield Wednesday where he won the FA Cup in 1907. He later starred for Everton and Arsenal, moving to the full back position the later years of his career. He played once for the England national team, scoring a hat-trick, and also represented the Southern League and the Football League, the latter on four occasions.

== Early life ==
Frank Bradshaw was born on 31 May 1884 in Sheffield, Yorkshire.

== Playing career ==
An intelligent inside-left, Bradshaw played for Oxford Street Sunday School and Sheffield Schools before joining Sheffield Wednesday as an amateur in 1904, turning professional the same year. In 1907, he played in Wednesday's FA Cup winning side thanks to an injury to regular inside-left Harry Davis. In June 1908 he played his only game for England, scoring a hat-trick as England beat Austria 11–1 in Vienna. Although he was once again selected to play Ireland the following February, he was forced to withdraw from the England squad due to injury, and was never selected again. He thus became the fifth and last (to date) player to score three goals on his solitary England appearance.

Bradshaw moved to Northampton Town in the summer of 1910 for a fee of £250, having played 87 league games and scored 37 goals for Wednesday. In November 1911 he returned to the Football League with Everton, where he scored 19 goals in 66 league games. In 1914 he moved to Arsenal, making his Arsenal debut in a Second Division match against Glossop North End on 1 September 1914, though after a season World War I intervened. Bradshaw continued to play for Arsenal, starring in over 125 unofficial wartime matches.

In December 1918, he was reported as one of around 60 well-known players and trainers who participated in the creation of a new Professional Football Players' and Trainer's Union.

By the time league football resumed in 1919 (and with Arsenal promoted to the First Division), Bradshaw had moved from inside-forward to full-back. He was a regular for Arsenal over the next four seasons, before retiring in May 1923. In addition to his wartime appearances, he played 142 league and cup games for Arsenal, scoring 14 goals.

A versatile player, he started his career as a forward before moving to the defender position later in his career, where he excelled. He was described in the Daily Herald as follows:

"He was a forward who compelled the admiration of all who saw him. He became a half-back and caused much controversy as to whether he was not even better there than in the attack. Most of you must remember how, after that, he was a brilliant back for the Arsenal."

In the Sheffield Star Green 'Un in 1917, he was mentioned as the best full-back in England.

"Bradshaw [..] has made for himself the reputation of being the best full-back in England, which surprised his old Sheffield friends to put it mildly. Many good critics, however, have declared that he resembles Crompton at his best."

== Managerial career ==
The same month he retired from playing, Bradshaw took over as manager of Aberdare Athletic. He left the club in April 1924 after guiding them to mid-table safety in the Third Division South.

He was later the manager of Taunton Town.

== Career statistics ==
=== Club ===
Appearances and goals by club, season and competition
Club	Season	League			FA Cup		Total	
Club	Season	Division	Apps	Goals	Apps	Goals	Apps	Goals
Sheffield Wednesday	1905–06	First Division	1	2	0	0	1	2
Sheffield Wednesday	1906–07	First Division	13	2	4	0	17	2
Sheffield Wednesday	1907–08	First Division	30	12	1	0	31	12
Sheffield Wednesday	1908–09	First Division	31	18	3	2	34	20
Sheffield Wednesday	1909–10	First Division	12	3	0	0	12	3
Sheffield Wednesday	Total		87	37	8	2	95	39
Everton	1911–12	First Division	21	8	4	0	25	8
Everton	1912–13	First Division	34	10	3	1	37	11
Everton	1913–14	First Division	11	1	1	1	12	2
Everton	Total		66	19	8	2	74	21
Arsenal	1914–15	Second Division	29	10	2	0	31	10
Arsenal	1919–20	First Division	33	2	2	0	35	2
Arsenal	1920–21	First Division	21	0	0	0	21	0
Arsenal	1921–22	First Division	32	2	6	0	38	6
Arsenal	1922–23	First Division	17	0	0	0	17	0
Arsenal	Total		132	14	10	0	142	14
Career total			285	70	26	4	311	74

=== International ===
Appearances and goals by national team and year
National team	Year	Apps	Goals
England	1908	1	3
Total		1	3

England score listed first, score column indicates score after each Bradshaw goal

List of international goals scored by Frank Bradshaw
No.	Date	Venue	Cap	Opponent	Score	Result	Competition	Ref.
1	8 June 1908	Hohe Warte Stadium, Vienna, Austria	1	Austria	4–0	11–1	Friendly	
2	8 June 1908	Hohe Warte Stadium, Vienna, Austria	1	Austria	8–0	11–1	Friendly	
3	8 June 1908	Hohe Warte Stadium, Vienna, Austria	1	Austria	11–1	11–1	Friendly	

== Honours ==
Sheffield Wednesday

- FA Cup: 1906–07
