= Sid Binks =

English footballer

Sydney Binks
Personal information
- Full name: Sydney Binks
- Date of birth: 25 July 1899
- Place of birth: Bishop Auckland, England
- Date of death: 4 February 1978 (aged 78)
- Place of death: Sheffield, England
- Height: 6 ft 1/4 in (1.84 m)
- Positions: Centre-forward; centre-half

Senior career*
Years	Team	Apps	(Gls)
	Spennymoor United	?	(?)
	Bishop Auckland	?	(?)
1922–1924	Sheffield Wednesday	76	(29)
1924–1925	Huddersfield Town	4	(1)
1925–1927	Blackpool	55	(9)
1927	Portsmouth	0	(0)
1928	Southend United	14	(0)
1928–1929	Fulham	27	(0)
1930–1931	Chesterfield	44	(12)
1932	Sheffield Wednesday	0	(0)
?	Ashington	?	(?)
- * Club domestic league appearances and goals

Sydney Binks (25 July 1899 – 4 February 1978) was a professional footballer who played for Bishop Auckland, Spennymoor United, Sheffield Wednesday, Huddersfield Town, Blackpool, Portsmouth, Southend United, Fulham, Chesterfield before returning to Sheffield Wednesday.
