= Harry Davis (footballer, born 1879) =

English footballer

Personal information
- Full name: Harry Davis
- Date of birth: 8 November 1879
- Place of birth: Wombwell, England
- Date of death: 17 October 1945 (aged 65)
- Position: Winger

Senior career*
Years	Team	Apps	(Gls)
1897–1900	Barnsley	49	(21)
1900–1908	Sheffield Wednesday	213	(59)

International career
1903	England	3	(1)
- * Club domestic league appearances and goals

Harry Davis (8 November 1879 – 17 October 1945) was an English footballer during the late 1890s and early 1900s.

== Career ==
His career started in non-League Football at Ardsley. He then became a part of the 1898–99 Barnsley squad in their first season in the Football League 2nd Division. His late goal against Luton Town secured the Reds' first ever league win.

On 22 January 1900, Davis moved to Sheffield Wednesday where he was part of two League Championship victories in the 1902–03 and 1903–04 seasons.

He won three caps for England, all during the Home Nations Championship of 1903. His only international goal came on his debut against Ireland on 14 February 1903.

== See also ==
- List of England international footballers (2–3 caps)
- List of Sheffield Wednesday F.C. players
