= Fred Kean =

English footballer

Personal information
- Full name: Frederick William Kean
- Date of birth: 10 December 1898
- Place of birth: Sheffield, England
- Date of death: 28 October 1973 (aged 74)
- Place of death: Sheffield, England
- Height: 5 ft 8 1/2 in (1.74 m)
- Position: Right half

Senior career*
Years	Team	Apps	(Gls)
1920–1928	The Wednesday	230	(8)
1928–1931	Bolton Wanderers	80	(1)
1931–1934	Luton Town	117	(5)
Total		427	(14)

International career
1923–1929	England	9	(0)
- * Club domestic league appearances and goals

Frederick William Kean (10 December 1898 – 28 October 1973) was an English international footballer who played professionally as a right half for The Wednesday, Bolton Wanderers and Luton Town. Kean was born in Sheffield and won nine caps for England between 1923 and 1929. He captained the team once, against Luxembourg in 1927.

== Honours ==
Bolton Wanderers

- FA Cup: 1928–29
