= 1909–10 Scottish Division Two =

Scottish Division Two
- Season: 1909–10
- Champions: Leith Athletic and Raith Rovers
- Promoted: Raith Rovers

The 1909–10 Scottish Division Two was won by Leith Athletic and Raith Rovers, with Ayr Parkhouse finishing bottom.

== Table ==
Pos	Team	Pld	W	D	L	GF	GA	GD	Pts	Promotion or relegation
1	Leith Athletic (C)	22	13	7	2	44	19	+25	33 (Note: Leith Athletic and Raith Rovers finished level on points but did not contest a play-off match for the championship so were declared joint winners.)	
1	Raith Rovers (C, P)	22	14	5	3	36	21	+15	33	Promoted to the 1910–11 Scottish Division One
3	St Bernard's	22	12	3	7	43	31	+12	27	
4	Dumbarton	22	9	5	8	44	38	+6	23	
5	Abercorn	22	7	8	7	38	40	−2	22	
6	Ayr	22	9	3	10	37	40	−3	21	
6	Vale of Leven	22	8	5	9	36	38	−2	21	
8	East Stirlingshire	22	9	2	11	38	43	−5	20	
9	Albion Rovers	22	7	5	10	34	39	−5	19	
10	Arthurlie	22	6	5	11	34	47	−13	17	
10	Cowdenbeath	22	7	3	12	22	34	−12	17	
12	Ayr Parkhouse	22	4	3	15	27	43	−16	11	Merged with Ayr

Source: statto.com
Rules for classification: Teams finish equal if level on points. Points system: 2 points for a win, 1 point for a draw, 0 points for a loss
(C) Champions; (P) Promoted
