= Jackie Robinson (footballer) =

English footballer (1917–1972)

Personal information
- Full name: John Allan Robinson
- Date of birth: 10 August 1917
- Place of birth: Shiremoor, England
- Date of death: 30 July 1972 (aged 54)
- Place of death: Shiremoor, England
- Position: Inside forward

Youth career
- West Wylam

Senior career*
Years	Team	Apps	(Gls)
1934–1946	Sheffield Wednesday	108	(34)
1946–1949	Sunderland	82	(34)
1949	Lincoln City	8	(5)
Total		198	(73)

International career
1937–1938	England	4	(3)

Managerial career
- 1949: Lincoln City (player-manager)
- * Club domestic league appearances and goals

John Allan Robinson (10 August 1917 – 30 July 1972) was an English footballer and player-coach. He played as an inside forward, and signed for Sheffield Wednesday in 1934 at the age of 16. He went on to play for Sunderland and Lincoln City, also taking up managerial duties in his brief time at Lincoln. He was also capped for England on four occasions, scoring three goals in doing so. Robinson's career lasted from 1935 to 1949, making 200 league appearances and scoring 71 goals. Robinson lost some of his best years to the Second World War during which time he continued to play for Sheffield Wednesday in the regional wartime leagues making 109 appearances and scoring 91 goals, although these matches are not recognised in official records.

== Early years ==
John Allan Robinson was born in the village of Shiremoor on 10 August 1917, with one brother and two sisters. He excelled in sport at school, where he was a champion athlete and played on the school's rugby and football teams. He earned a county schoolboy cap in 1930, at the age of 13. As a youth he played for West Wylam, a junior team affiliated to a coal mine in the small town of Prudhoe to the west of Newcastle upon Tyne. Despite being one of the youngest members of the team he began to make a name for himself as a fast, tricky inside forward. In 1934, Sheffield Wednesday manager Billy Walker came to watch a wing half who was marking Robinson in a match against West Wylam. However, Robinson outplayed the wing half and Walker approached Robinson's parents for permission to sign the 16-year-old.

== Club career ==
=== Sheffield Wednesday ===
Robinson joined a very successful Sheffield Wednesday team, which in the 1934–35 season finished third in Division one and won the FA Cup. For the majority of the season Robinson had played for the youth team, having not even turned out for the reserves when he made a surprise his first team debut on 22 April 1935 against West Bromwich Albion. This was just five days before the FA Cup final against the same team and Robinson replaced club captain Ronnie Starling who was being rested for the final. Robinson had not even brought his boots for the match and borrowed Starling's. He scored the goal in a 1–1 draw. Five days later Robinson was a non-playing member of the Wednesday squad which beat West Bromwich 4–2 in the FA Cup final.

Conscious of his young age, Billy Walker only used Robinson occasionally in the 1935–36 season, and he made just five appearances. He became a regular in the team the following season and his good form led to a call up for an England international trial at Burnley on 17 March 1937. Two months later he was selected for the full England side to play Finland in Helsinki on 20 May 1937 at the age of 19 years 283 days.

Sheffield Wednesday were relegated in 1937 and started the 1937–38 season in Division Two, several of the bigger clubs tried to sign Robinson but he stayed with Wednesday along with fellow international Ted Catlin. Robinson's form remained good throughout that season and he was selected for the England's sides three match tour of continental Europe in May 1938.

The onset of World War II interrupted Jackie Robinson's rising career. During the war years he was stationed at Middlesbrough and continued to play for Sheffield Wednesday in the Football League North. His goal scoring record was excellent, scoring 91 goals in 109 games although the standard of play was obviously reduced. After the war Robinson was made club captain for Wednesday for the 1946–47 season but after just seven matches that season he was sold to Sunderland for £5,000, aged 29. His last game for Wednesday was a 0–1 defeat on 25 September 1946 against Chesterfield at Hillsborough. The reason cited for the transfer was that Robinson was training at Newcastle United on weekdays and just travelling to Sheffield for matches and the board found this unacceptable for the club captain. He played 121 official games for Sheffield Wednesday (including FA Cup), scoring 39 goals. If the regional wartime matches are included, he played 228 games, scoring 130 times.

=== Sunderland ===
Jackie Robinson played for three seasons at Sunderland, forming a fine attacking partnership with Len Shackleton. In total he played 82 league games and scored 32 goals, all in the First Division. By the summer of 1949, Robinson was 32 years old and Sunderland had just signed a classy inside forward in Ivor Broadis from Carlisle United. First team opportunities seemed to be limited so he accepted the post of Player-coach at Lincoln City for the 1949–50 season.

=== Lincoln City ===
Robinson only played in nine games (eight league and one FA cup) for Lincoln, scoring five goals. His ninth game was on Christmas Eve 1949, a home league match in the old Division Three North against Wrexham. Robinson scored two goals in the game but received a broken leg when scoring the second goal. The x-ray in Lincoln hospital revealed a complicated break and he never played competitive football again.

== International career ==
Robinson was selected for the England's sides three match tour of continental Europe in May 1938. The first match was against Germany in Berlin on 14 May, the match was infamous because the England players were forced to give the Nazi salute. None of the England players wanted to do the salute but the British ambassador insisted to keep the crowd in a good frame of mind. The game itself resulted in a fine 6–3 victory for England with Jackie Robinson scoring twice. The England tour continued with matches against Switzerland (lost 1–2) and France (won 4–2), although Robinson was rested for the France match.

== Personal life ==
After football Jackie Robinson became a landlord of a public house, running "The Ship" in Gateshead very successfully for a few years in the 1950s. After that he moved back to his home town of Shiremoor. Jackie died on 30 July 1972, aged 54 from cancer, having previously had two strokes and kidney problems.

== Honours ==
Sheffield Wednesday

- FA Cup: 1935
- FA Community Shield: 1935

== Bibliography ==
- The Jackie Robinson Story, Alan Troilett and Eric Brodie, Pickard Communication, 2004, ISBN 0-9547264-2-1
