= Teddy Brayshaw =

English footballer

Personal information
- Full name: Edward Brayshaw
- Date of birth: 6 October 1863
- Place of birth: Sheffield, England
- Date of death: 20 November 1908 (aged 45)
- Position: Centre half

Senior career*
Years	Team	Apps	(Gls)
- All Saints
- Walkley
1884–1891	The Wednesday	0	(0)
1892–1893	Grimsby Town	2	(0)
1893	Chesterfield Rangers		

International career
1887	England	1	(0)
- * Club domestic league appearances and goals

Edward Brayshaw (6 October 1863 – 20 November 1908) was an English international footballer, who played as a centre half.

== Career ==
Born in Sheffield, Brayshaw played for The Wednesday and Grimsby Town and earned one cap for England in 1887.
