= Billy Marsden =

English footballer and manager

Personal information
- Full name: William Marsden
- Date of birth: 10 November 1901
- Place of birth: Silksworth, England
- Date of death: 19 September 1983 (aged 81)
- Place of death: Sheffield, England
- Height: 5 ft 9 in (1.75 m)
- Position: Left half

Senior career*
Years	Team	Apps	(Gls)
- Silksworth Colliery
- Ryhope
1920–1924	Sunderland	3	(2)
1924–1930	Sheffield Wednesday	205	(9)
Total		208	(11)

International career
1929–1930	England	3	(0)

Managerial career
- 1931−1934: HBS
- 1935: HBS
- 1935−1938: Be Quick 1887
- 1938−1939: Hermes-DVS
- 1939−1940: HBS
- 1944−1946: Doncaster Rovers
- 1953–1954: Worksop Town
- * Club domestic league appearances and goals

William Marsden (10 November 1901 – 19 September 1983) was an English international footballer, who played as a left half, and later managed Doncaster Rovers.

== Early and personal life ==
Marsen was born in Silksworth, the fourth of five children. His father was a coal mine hewer.

Marsden was married with one daughter.

== Playing career ==
Marsden began his career with Silksworth Colliery and Ryhope. He signed for Sunderland in October 1920, and scored 2 goals in 3 games for them. He moved to Sheffield Wednesday in May 1924, scoring 9 goals in 205 league games for them, before retiring in May 1930 after receiving a spinal injury whilst playing for England. He played for Sheffield Wednesday's reserves at the start of the 1930–31 season, but was injured again and was left unconscious.

Marsden earned three caps for England between 1929 and 1930.

== Coaching career ==
Before World War Two, Marsden was a coach in the Netherlands. In December 1931 he became manager of HBS, leaving in July 1934. He then was a trainer at Gateshead, but left the club in December of that year after not being made manager as he had been promised. He then returned to HBC, moving on to Be Quick 1887 by March 1935. He also managed Hermes-DVS.

Marsden was appointed manager of Doncaster Rovers in August 1944 for the Wartime League, and was replaced by Jackie Bestall in March 1946 as Rovers prepared for the resumption the post war Football League in Division 3 North.

Marsden was manager of Worksop Town for a season from May 1953.

== Later life and death ==
Marsden later became a publican in Sheffield, including at The Robin Hood Inn, The White Lion, and the Crosspool Tavern. He died in Sheffield on 19 September 1983, aged 81.
