= Ted Catlin =

English footballer (1910–1990)

Personal information
- Full name: Arthur Edward Catlin
- Date of birth: 11 January 1910
- Place of birth: South Bank, Middlesbrough, England
- Date of death: 28 November 1990 (aged 80)
- Place of death: Sheffield, England
- Position: Left back

Youth career
- South Bank

Senior career*
Years	Team	Apps	(Gls)
1931–1939	Sheffield Wednesday	209	(0)

International career
1936–1937	England	5	(0)
- * Club domestic league appearances and goals

Arthur Edward Catlin (11 January 1910 – 28 November 1990) was an English footballer who played his entire professional career for Sheffield Wednesday. He was a strong tackling left back who made 230 appearances (including cup games) for Wednesday between 1931 and 1939. He also played for the England national football team on five occasions. Catlin never scored a goal in an official match in his 8 1/2-year career at Hillsborough although he did score in the wartime league game against Notts County in 1944 which Wednesday won 6–1.

== Playing career ==
Catlin was born in South Bank, a north eastern suburb of Middlesbrough and played youth football with Middlesbrough Schools and his local junior club South Bank F.C. before signing for Sheffield Wednesday. He made his debut for the Owls on 28 March 1931 in a 4–0 win over Leicester City, but that was his only appearance that season and it was some time before Catlin became a regular in the side being kept out by England international left back Ernie Blenkinsop. He played 16 games in the 1933–34 season then became Wednesday's regular left back when Blenkinsop was surprisingly transferred to Liverpool in April 1934. Many Wednesday supporters were angered by the sale of Blenkinsop, however Catlin proved to be a more than adequate replacement.

In the 1934–35 season Catlin played in all six FA Cup ties as Wednesday lifted the cup and also finished third in the league. He was also a member of the Wednesday side which won the Charity Shield at the start of the following season. Catlin's good form led to five England caps in the 1936–37 season, starting against Wales on 17 October 1936 followed by matches against Northern Ireland, Hungary, Norway and finally Sweden on 17 May 1937. During that time he also played for the Football League representative side in 1936 and in an international trial for the Probables against the Possibles on 17 March 1937 at Burnley; fellow Wednesday player Jackie Robinson was playing for the Possibles.

Catlin lived in Wadsley Lane at Wadsley during his time as a Wednesday player and was a close neighbour of Roy Hattersley, Hattersley remembers Catlin in his autobiography, "A Yorkshire Boyhood", saying "Mr. Catlin, in his time the best left back in England, would sit on the wall at the end of his front garden, and I used to see him dangling his famous feet on the pavement almost every time I was taken to the Wisewood Co-Op."

Sheffield Wednesday were relegated to Division Two at the end of the 1936–37 season, despite talk of a possible transfer he stayed with Wednesday. However he lost his England place to Eddie Hapgood and never played for the national side again. Catlin had a lucky escape just before Christmas 1938 when the car he was travelling in along with fellow player Bill Fallon skidded in snow at Wadsley Bridge and hit a telegraph pole. Both players went to hospital and were out of the team for several weeks.

Catlin played his last game for Wednesday and last official career game in a 0–1 home defeat to Plymouth Argyle on 2 September 1939, the day that Britain declared war on Germany. Wednesday held his registration throughout the Second World War, meaning he was on their books for 14 years. He played 96 games for Wednesday during the war appearing in the 1943 (North) War Cup Final which Wednesday lost to Blackpool over two legs. It was in the second leg of this final that Catlin was badly injured in a collision with Blackpool's Jock Dodds, an injury which effectively ended his career although he did play on for two more years.

== After football ==
After the war Catlin returned to Sheffield and became chief scout for Sheffield Wednesday for a time. He then became a pub landlord, running four pubs in the area, "The Anvil" at Malin Bridge, the "Rose and Crown" at Wadsley, the "Kelvin Grove" at Upperthorpe and "The Magnet" in the Southey area of Sheffield. He also ran a boarding house in Blackpool for a time. Ted Catlin died aged 80 on 28 November 1990. In May 2006 Ted's 1935 FA Cup winners medal came up for sale at Sotheby's in London and sold for £3,600, also in the same sale was Catlin's first England cap which sold for £1,100.

== Honours ==
Sheffield Wednesday

- FA Cup: 1934–35
- FA Charity Shield: 1935
