= Arnold Birch =

English footballer

Personal information
- Date of birth: 1891
- Place of birth: Grenoside, England
- Date of death: 1964 (aged 72–73)
- Height: 6 ft 1 in (1.85 m)
- Position: Goalkeeper

Youth career
- –1914: Tankersley Colliery

Senior career*
Years	Team	Apps	(Gls)
1918	Be Quick	?	(?)
1919–1923	The Wednesday	27	(0)
1923–1927	Chesterfield	141	(5)
1927–1929	Denaby United	?	(?)
Total		168	(5)
- * Club domestic league appearances and goals

Arnold Birch (1891–1964) was an English professional footballer who played as a goalkeeper.

== World War I ==
Birch worked at Newton, Chambers & Company's Tankersley mine until it closed in 1914 at the outbreak of World War I. He voluntarily joined the 1st Royal Naval Brigade. After a flee from Antwerp, Belgium with his division in October 1914, he spent the rest of the war in an internment camp in Groningen, Netherlands playing football in the highly rated internal competition alongside Harry Waites.

He joined local side Be Quick in 1916 as a masseur and later as a coach and was allowed to play for the team in 1918. Be Quick won the Eerste Klasse North and qualified for the Championship play-off finishing fifth.

== Football career ==
Upon returning to England, Birch made 27 appearances for The Wednesday in the Football League between August 1919 and January 1923. He later played for Chesterfield, scoring 5 goals in 141 League appearances. He later played non-League football with Denaby United.
