= George Robertson (footballer, born 1885) =

Scottish footballer

Personal information
- Full name: George Clark Robertson
- Date of birth: 7 March 1885
- Place of birth: Menstrie, Scotland
- Date of death: 10 May 1937 (aged 52)
- Place of death: Providence, Rhode Island, United States
- Position: Outside left

Youth career
- Menstrie Victoria

Senior career*
Years	Team	Apps	(Gls)
–	Yoker Athletic		
1906–1910	Motherwell	123	(25)
1910–1920	The Wednesday	163	(30)
1920–1921	East Fife		
Total		286	(55)

International career
1910–1913	Scotland	4	(0)
- * Club domestic league appearances and goals

George Clark Robertson (7 March 1885 – 10 May 1937) was a Scottish footballer who played for Yoker Athletic, Motherwell, The Wednesday and East Fife. Robertson also represented Scotland four times, between 1910 and 1913.

== See also ==
- List of Motherwell F.C. players
- List of Sheffield Wednesday F.C. players
