= Ron Greensmith =

English footballer (1933–2015)

Personal information
- Full name: Ronald Greensmith
- Date of birth: 22 January 1933
- Place of birth: Sheffield, England
- Date of death: 18 December 2015 (aged 82)
- Place of death: York, England
- Height: 5 ft 8 in (1.73 m)
- Position: Winger

Senior career*
Years	Team	Apps	(Gls)
–1954	Shiregreen Working Men's Club		
1954–1958	Sheffield Wednesday	5	(0)
1958–1960	York City	42	(1)
1960–	Scarborough		
- Bridlington Town
Total		47	(1)
- * Club domestic league appearances and goals

Ronald Greensmith (22 January 1933 – 18 December 2015) was an English professional footballer who played as a winger in the Football League for Sheffield Wednesday and York City and in non-League football for Shiregreen Working Men's Club, Scarborough and Bridlington Town.
