= Ryan Jones (footballer, born 1973) =

Welsh footballer

Personal information
- Full name: Ryan Anthony Jones
- Date of birth: 23 July 1973 (age 53)
- Place of birth: Sheffield, England
- Position: Midfielder

Youth career
- Sheffield Wednesday

Senior career*
Years	Team	Apps	(Gls)
1991–1998	Sheffield Wednesday	41	(6)
1996	→ Scunthorpe United (loan)	11	(3)
1998–1999	Worksop Town		

International career
	Wales u21	3	(0)
1994	Wales B	1	(0)
1994	Wales	1	(0)
- * Club domestic league appearances and goals

Ryan Jones (born 23 July 1973) is a former professional footballer who played as a midfielder.

== Club career ==
Jones notably played in the Premier League for Sheffield Wednesday, as well as a loan spell with Scunthorpe United. He finished his career with non-league side Worksop Town, where he retired through injury.

== International career ==
Born in England, Jones was eligible to represent Wales because his grandfather was born in Ynys Môn. On 2 February 1994, Jones represented Wales B at The Racecourse against Scotland B. He played the whole game in a 2-1 victory.

At the end of the 1993-94 season Jones won his only full cap in a match against Estonia in 1994 when a host of Welsh midfielders dropped out.
