= Frank Noble =

English footballer

Personal information
- Date of birth: 26 October 1945 (age 81)
- Place of birth: Sheffield, England
- Position: Full back

Youth career
- Sheffield Wednesday

Senior career*
Years	Team	Apps	(Gls)
	Sheffield Wednesday	2	(0)
	Peterborough United	207	(1)
- * Club domestic league appearances and goals

Frank Noble (born 26 October 1945) is a former footballer who played as a full back in the Football League during the 1960s and 1970s, mainly with Peterborough United. He was born in Sheffield.

He started as a junior with Sheffield Wednesday, although he only made two Football League appearances for them, with his last appearance in 1965/66.

He moved to Peterborough United for 1967-68 and went on to play 226 games for the club. He played for them in their FA Cup 3rd round tie against Portsmouth on 27 January 1968, which was their last FA Cup game prior to their demotion for financial irregularities. He retired from football during the 1971–72 season.
