= Tony Leach =

English footballer

Personal information
- Full name: Thomas Leach
- Date of birth: 23 September 1903
- Place of birth: Rotherham, England
- Date of death: 1970 (aged 66–67)
- Position: Centre half

Senior career*
Years	Team	Apps	(Gls)
1927–1934	Sheffield Wednesday	238	(11)
1934–1936	Newcastle United	51	(2)
Total		289	(13)

International career
1930	England	2	(0)
- * Club domestic league appearances and goals

Thomas "Tony" Leach (23 September 1903 – 1970) was an English international footballer, who played as a centre half.

== Career ==
Born in Rotherham, Leach played professionally for Sheffield Wednesday and Newcastle United, and earned two caps for England in 1930. He played in Sheffield Wednesday's 2–1 defeat by Arsenal in the Charity Shield at Stamford Bridge in October 1930.
