= Jack Burkinshaw =

English footballer

Personal information
- Full name: John Dean Lewis Burkinshaw
- Date of birth: 12 May 1890
- Place of birth: Kilnhurst, England
- Date of death: 1947 (aged 56–57)
- Height: 5 ft 8 in (1.73 m)
- Position: Wing half

Senior career*
Years	Team	Apps	(Gls)
1907–1908	Kilnhurst Town		
1908–1909	Grimsby Town	5	(3)
1909–1910	Rotherham Town		
1910–1913	Swindon Town		
1913–1919	The Wednesday	56	(8)
1919–1920	Rotherham Town		
1920–1921	Bradford Park Avenue	23	(2)
1921–1922	Accrington Stanley	31	(1)
1922–1923	Denaby United		
1923–1924	Wath Athletic		
1924–192?	Chicago Bricklayers		
- * Club domestic league appearances and goals

John Dean Lewis Burkinshaw (12 May 1890 – 1947) was an English professional footballer who played as a wing half.
