= Jack Brown (footballer, born 1899) =

English footballer (1899–1962)

Personal information
- Full name: John Henry Brown
- Date of birth: 19 March 1899
- Place of birth: Hodthorpe, Whitwell, England
- Date of death: 9 April 1962 (aged 63)
- Place of death: Sheffield, England
- Position: Goalkeeper

Youth career
- –1923: Worksop Wesley
- Worksop Town

Senior career*
| Years | Team | Apps | (Gls) |
| 1923–1937 | Sheffield Wednesday | 465 | (0) |
| 1937 | Hartlepools United | 1 | (0) |

International career
| 1927–1929 | England | 6 | (0) |
- * Club domestic league appearances and goals

John Henry Brown (19 March 1899 – 9 April 1962) was an English football goalkeeper who played almost all his professional career with Sheffield Wednesday before moving to play briefly for Hartlepools United. Brown's career lasted from 1923 to 1937 during which time he made 466 League appearances (508 including FA Cup). He will be remembered for being Sheffield Wednesday's goalkeeper during a golden period between 1925 and 1935 in which they won two Division One championships, the FA Cup and a Division Two championship. He also played six times for the England national football team.

== Playing career ==
=== Early days ===
Jack Brown was born in Hodthorpe, Derbyshire. On leaving school he worked as a coal miner at Manton colliery. As a junior, he played for local junior clubs Worksop Wesley and Netherton, initially he was a centre forward before switching because his side were short of a goalkeeper. In 1919 he signed for non-league club Worksop Town and played in a team that were Midland League champions in the 1921–22 season and reached the third round of the FA Cup in that season and the following one. The third round tie in 1922–23 was against Tottenham Hotspur away at White Hart Lane, Brown had a superb game as Worksop held Tottenham to a 0–0 draw. Worksop's directors requested that the replay be held at Tottenham's ground again for financial reasons. Tottenham won the replay 9–0 but Jack Brown had done enough to grab the attention of League clubs and he promptly signed for Sheffield Wednesday in February 1923 for a fee of £360.

=== Sheffield Wednesday ===
Brown was signed by Wednesday as an understudy to long serving international keeper Teddy Davison who was by then 36 years old and reaching the end of his career. Brown made his debut for the club on 21 April 1923 in an away match at Coventry City, however that was his only match that season. Brown was almost released by the club at the start of the 1923–24 season but a broken arm for Davison ensured he was kept on the books. For the following two seasons Brown and Davison shared goalkeeping duties and it was not until the 1925–26 season that Brown became first choice. Jack Brown was ever present in that season as The Owls won the Division Two championship, one of his most telling contributions was a penalty save two minutes from time in a crucial away match with promotion rivals Chelsea in April 1926.

Brown's good form earned a call up from the England team and he played his first international against Wales on 12 February 1927 at Wrexham's Racecourse Ground. This resulted in a 3–3 draw with Brown picking up a bad injury. He recovered from the injury and was called up again on 2 April and played in a 2–1 victory against Scotland at Hampden Park with a reporter from the Athletic News saying, "Brown kept a splendid goal and in my opinion is in Sam Hardy's class". In all Brown played six times for England, never once finishing on the losing side, winning five and drawing one, he played his last international on 19 October 1929.

Brown was ever present throughout Sheffield Wednesday's Division One championship winning side in 1928–29 and only missed one match the following season when they retained the title. He played in Sheffield Wednesday's 2–1 defeat by Arsenal in the Charity Shield at Stamford Bridge in October 1930. He remained first choice for the following seven seasons, although he did lose his place occasionally to Jack Breedon between 1930 and 1933. He played in all six FA Cup ties in 1935 as Wednesday won the cup and made some outstanding saves in the final win against West Bromwich Albion. He also played as Wednesday won the 1935 FA Charity Shield. Brown made his final appearance for Sheffield Wednesday on 20 March 1937 as the team were relegated back to Division Two. In total he made 507 appearances for The Owls in all competitions and is second on the list of appearance makers behind Andrew Wilson, he is one of only three players who have made over 500 appearances for the club. In September 1937 he was transferred to Hartlepools United but only played one game for them, a 3–1 defeat against Gateshead on 18 September. He then decided to retire from football at the age of 38.

== After football ==
After retiring Brown ran an off-licence in Sheffield, he then became the landlord of a public house before becoming a newsagent in the Highfield area of Sheffield. He also worked for the Sheffield Drill and Twist Company in Handsworth, South Yorkshire. He died on 9 April 1962, aged 63.

== Honours ==
Sheffield Wednesday

- FA Cup: 1934–35
