= Jack Lyall =

Scottish footballer

Personal information
- Full name: John Lyall
- Date of birth: 16 April 1881
- Place of birth: Dundee, Scotland
- Date of death: 17 February 1944 (aged 62)
- Place of death: Detroit, United States
- Height: 6 ft 2 in (1.88 m)
- Position: Goalkeeper

Senior career*
Years	Team	Apps	(Gls)
1899–1901	Jarrow		
1901–1909	Sheffield Wednesday	263	(0)
1909–1911	Manchester City	40	(0)
1911–1914	Dundee	83	(0)
1914–1915	Ayr United	48	(0)
1915–1917	Jarrow		
Total		303	(0)

International career
1905	Scotland	1	(0)
- * Club domestic league appearances and goals

John Lyall (16 April 1881 – 17 February 1944) was a Scottish footballer who played as a goalkeeper.

== Career ==
Born in Dundee but raised on Tyneside, Lyall played club football for Jarrow, Sheffield Wednesday, Manchester City and Dundee, and made one appearance for Scotland in 1905.

He made 295 appearances in all competitions for Wednesday and won the Football League title twice (1902–03, 1903–04) and the FA Cup once (1907) during his eight years with them.

He made 44 appearances in all competitions for Manchester City and won the Second Division title in 1909–10 during his time with them.

== Personal life ==
Lyall served as a corporal in the Royal Engineers during the First World War and was deployed in India. He later emigrated to the United States.

== See also ==
- List of Scotland international footballers with one cap
- List of Sheffield Wednesday F.C. players
