= List of Sheffield Wednesday F.C. seasons =

Sheffield Wednesday league performance over time depicted in graphical format

This is a list of seasons played by Sheffield Wednesday Football Club in English and European football, from 1877 (when The Wednesday first entered the Sheffield Challenge Cup) to the present day. It details the club's achievements in major competitions, the top scorers in all competitions, and the average home league attendance for each season.

== Seasons ==
List of seasons, including league division and statistics, cup results, top scorer and average league attendance
Season	League record									FA Cup	EFL Cup (Note: The EFL Cup was not created until the 1960–61 season.)	Other		Top scorer (Note: Includes goals scored in league games (including play-offs), FA Cup, EFL Cup and Associate Members' Cup/EFL Trophy.)		Average (Note: League matches only (including Premier League, Football League and Football Alliance, but excluding play-offs).) attendance
Season	Division	P	W	D	L	F	A	Pts	Pos	FA Cup	EFL Cup	Competition	Result	Name	Goals	Average attendance
1867–68	N/A (Note: League football in England was established in 1888, while Wednesday were admitted to the Football League in 1892.)									—	—	Cromwell Cup	W	—	—	N/A
1876–77	N/A									DNE	—	Sheffield & Hallamshire Senior Cup	W	—	—	N/A
1877–78	N/A									DNE	—	Sheffield & Hallamshire Senior Cup	W	—	—	N/A
1878–79	N/A									DNE	—	Sheffield & Hallamshire Senior Cup Wharncliffe Charity Cup	R2 W	—	—	N/A
1879–80	N/A									DNE	—	Sheffield & Hallamshire Senior Cup Wharncliffe Charity Cup	R1 RU	—	—	N/A
1880–81	N/A									R4	—	Sheffield & Hallamshire Senior Cup Wharncliffe Charity Cup	W RU	Bob Gregory	6	N/A
1881–82	N/A									SF	—	Sheffield & Hallamshire Senior Cup Wharncliffe Charity Cup	R3 W	Tom Cawley E. Rhodes	7	N/A
1882–83	N/A									R4	—	Sheffield & Hallamshire Senior Cup Wharncliffe Charity Cup	W W	Bob Gregory	8	N/A
1883–84	N/A									R1	—	Sheffield & Hallamshire Senior Cup Wharncliffe Charity Cup	R2 R1	Harry Winterbottom	1	N/A
1884–85	N/A									R2	—	Sheffield & Hallamshire Senior Cup Wharncliffe Charity Cup	R3 RU	Tom Cawley Jim Sayer	1	N/A
1885–86	N/A									R1	—	Sheffield & Hallamshire Senior Cup Wharncliffe Charity Cup	SF W	—	0	N/A
1886–87	N/A									DNE (Note: In the 1886–87 season, The Wednesday failed to submit their application for the FA Cup on time, an error which ultimately led to the club turning professional later in the season.)	—	Sheffield & Hallamshire Senior Cup Wharncliffe Charity Cup	W RU	—	—	N/A
1887–88	N/A									QF	—	Sheffield & Hallamshire Senior Cup Wharncliffe Charity Cup	W W	Billy Ingram	4	N/A
1888–89	N/A									QF	—			Jack Dungworth Tom Cawley	2	N/A
1889–90	Alliance (Note: The Wednesday became founder members of the Football Alliance in 1889 following their application to join the Football League being turned down.)	22	15	2	5	70	39	32	1st	RU	—			Billy Ingram	22	3,750
1890–91	Alliance	22	4	5	13	39	66	13	12th	R3	—			Harry Woolhouse	17	5,350
1891–92	Alliance	22	12	4	6	65	35	28	4th (Note: The Wednesday were unanimously elected to the First Division of the Football League in 1892.)	R3	—			Fred Spiksley	11	9,250
1892–93	Div 1	30	12	3	15	55	65	27	12th	QF	—			Fred Spiksley	18	10,500
1893–94	Div 1	30	9	8	13	48	57	26	12th	SF	—			Fred Spiksley	16	8,550
1894–95	Div 1	30	12	4	14	50	55	28	8th	SF	—			Harry Davis	12	9,625
1895–96	Div 1	30	12	5	13	44	53	29	7th	W	—			Fred Spiksley	14	8,975
1896–97	Div 1	30	10	11	9	42	37	31	6th	R1	—			Fred Spiksley	10	6,900
1897–98	Div 1	30	15	3	12	51	42	33	5th	R2	—			Fred Spiksley	17	9,140
1898–99	Div 1 ↓	34	8	8	18	32	61	24	18th	R1	—			Bill Hemmingfield	8	8,150
1899–1900	Div 2 ↑	34	25	4	5	84	22	54	1st	R2	—			Jocky Wright	27	6,800
1900–01	Div 1	34	13	10	11	52	42	36	8th	R1	—			Andrew Wilson	13	9,600
1901–02	Div 1	34	13	8	13	48	52	34	9th	R1	—			Harry Chapman	9	9,765
1902–03	Div 1	34	19	4	11	54	36	42	1st	R1	—			Harry Davis	13	14,015
1903–04	Div 1	34	20	7	7	48	28	47	1st	SF	—			Andrew Wilson	12	12,595
1904–05	Div 1	34	14	5	15	61	57	33	9th	SF	—			Andrew Wilson	18	12,880
1905–06	Div 1	38	18	8	12	63	52	44	3rd	QF	—			Jimmy Stewart	22	11,875
1906–07	Div 1	38	12	11	15	49	60	35	13th	W	—			Andrew Wilson	21	11,555
1907–08	Div 1	38	19	4	15	73	64	42	5th	R1	—			Andrew Wilson	19	13,500
1908–09	Div 1	38	17	6	15	67	61	40	5th	R3	—			Andrew Wilson	21	12,840
1909–10	Div 1	38	15	9	14	60	63	39	11th	R1	—			Andrew Wilson	12	10,720
1910–11	Div 1	38	17	8	13	47	48	42	6th	R1	—			Harry Chapman	11	11,890
1911–12	Div 1	38	16	9	13	69	49	41	5th	R1	—			David McLean	26	14,410
1912–13	Div 1	38	21	7	10	75	55	49	3rd	R3	—			David McLean	38	18,905
1913–14	Div 1	38	13	8	17	53	70	34	18th	QF	—			Andrew Wilson	15	21,360
1914–15	Div 1	38	15	13	10	61	54	43	7th	R3	—			David McLean	23	16,120
No competitive football was played between 1915 and 1919 due to World War I
1919–20	Div 1 ↓	42	7	9	26	28	64	23	22nd	R1	—			Jimmy Gill	8	18,430
1920–21	Div 2	42	15	11	16	48	48	41	10th	R2	—			Johnny McIntyre	27	20,545
1921–22	Div 2	42	15	14	13	47	50	44	10th	R1	—			James Lofthouse Johnny McIntyre	8	13,855
1922–23	Div 2	42	17	12	13	54	47	46	8th	R3	—			Sid Binks	16	16,690
1923–24	Div 2	42	16	12	14	54	51	44	8th	R2	—			Sid Binks	17	16,130
1924–25	Div 2	42	15	8	19	50	56	38	14th	R2	—			Jimmy Trotter	18	14,950
1925–26	Div 2 ↑	42	27	6	9	88	48	60	1st	R3	—			Jimmy Trotter	38	23,660
1926–27	Div 1	42	15	9	18	75	92	39	16th	R4	—			Jimmy Trotter	39	23,060
1927–28	Div 1	42	13	13	16	81	78	39	14th	R5	—			Mark Hooper	22	22,075
1928–29	Div 1	42	21	10	11	86	62	52	1st	R4	—			Jack Allen	35	27,017
1929–30	Div 1	42	26	8	8	105	57	60	1st	SF	—			Jack Allen	39	25,873
1930–31	Div 1	42	22	8	12	102	75	52	3rd	R4	—			Jack Ball	29	19,911
1931–32	Div 1	42	22	6	14	96	82	50	3rd	R5	—			Jack Ball Ellis Rimmer	23	16,906
1932–33	Div 1	42	21	9	12	80	68	51	3rd	R3	—			Jack Ball	35	16,704
1933–34	Div 1	42	16	9	17	62	67	41	11th	R5	—			Harry Burgess Neil Dewar Mark Hooper	13	16,019
1934–35	Div 1	42	18	13	11	70	64	49	3rd	W	—			Ellis Rimmer	26	18,568
1935–36	Div 1	42	13	12	17	63	77	38	20th	R4	—	Charity Shield	W	Neil Dewar	21	18,127
1936–37	Div 1 ↓	42	9	12	21	53	69	30	22nd	R4	—			Neil Dewar	10	20,708
1937–38	Div 2	42	14	10	18	49	56	38	17th	R3	—			Ernest Matthews Jackie Robinson	7	23,600
1938–39	Div 2	42	21	11	10	88	59	53	3rd	R5	—			Douglas Hunt	25	27,146
1939–40	Div 2	3	1	0	2	3	5	2	17th (Note: When the Second World War began, the 1939–40 Football League season was abandoned with three matches played.)	—	—			Charlie Napier	2	16,500
No competitive football was played between 1939 and 1946 due to World War II
1945–46	N/A (Note: The FA Cup was contested in 1945–46, but the Football League did not resume until the following season.)									R5	—			Charlie Tomlinson	4	—
1946–47	Div 2	42	12	8	22	67	88	32	20th	R5	—			Tommy Ward	18	26,082
1947–48	Div 2	42	20	11	11	66	53	51	4th	R4	—			Eddie Quigley	23	35,426
1948–49	Div 2	42	15	13	14	63	56	43	8th	R4	—			Eddie Quigley	19	34,146
1949–50	Div 2 ↑	42	18	16	8	67	48	52	2nd	R3	—			Redfern Froggatt	14	40,684
1950–51	Div 1 ↓	42	12	8	22	64	83	32	21st	R3	—			Redfern Froggatt Hugh McJarrow Dennis Woodhead	14	41,527
1951–52	Div 2 ↑	42	21	11	10	100	66	53	1st	R3	—			Derek Dooley	47	41,461
1952–53	Div 1	42	12	11	19	62	72	35	18th	R3	—			Jackie Sewell	17	42,530
1953–54	Div 1	42	15	6	21	70	91	36	19th	SF	—			Dennis Woodhead	21	35,923
1954–55	Div 1 ↓	42	8	10	24	63	100	26	22nd	R4	—			Jackie Sewell	14	27,149
1955–56	Div 2 ↑	42	21	13	8	101	62	55	1st	R3	—			Roy Shiner	33	27,454
1956–57	Div 1	42	16	6	20	82	88	38	14th	R3	—			Albert Quixall	24	29,460
1957–58	Div 1 ↓	42	12	7	23	69	92	31	22nd	R5	—			Roy Shiner	16	23,396
1958–59	Div 2 ↑	42	28	6	8	106	48	62	1st	R3	—			Roy Shiner	28	29,452
1959–60	Div 1	42	19	11	12	80	59	49	5th	SF	—			John Fantham	18	32,703
1960–61	Div 1	42	23	12	7	78	47	58	2nd	QF	DNE			John Fantham	23	31,054
1961–62	Div 1	42	20	6	16	72	58	46	6th	R5	DNE	Inter-Cities Fairs Cup	QF	John Fantham	24	28,882
1962–63	Div 1	42	19	10	13	77	63	48	6th	R4	DNE			David Layne	30	25,686
1963–64	Div 1	42	19	11	12	84	67	49	6th	R3	DNE	Inter-Cities Fairs Cup	R2	David Layne	28	24,051
1964–65	Div 1	42	16	11	15	57	55	43	8th	R3	DNE			John Fantham	20	20,745
1965–66	Div 1	42	14	8	20	56	66	36	17th	RU	DNE			John Fantham	15	23,161
1966–67	Div 1	42	14	13	15	56	47	41	11th	QF	R2			David Ford John Ritchie	15	30,460
1967–68	Div 1	42	11	12	19	51	63	34	19th	R5	R4			John Ritchie	22	31,735
1968–69	Div 1	42	10	16	16	41	54	36	15th	R4	R2			Jack Whitham	10	27,150
1969–70	Div 1 ↓	42	8	9	25	40	71	25	22nd	R4	R2	Anglo-Italian Cup	GS	Jack Whitham	11	26,619
1970–71	Div 2	42	12	12	18	51	69	36	15th	R3	R2			Mick Prendergast	16	16,036
1971–72	Div 2	42	13	12	17	51	58	38	14th	R3	R2			Brian Joicey	16	17,160
1972–73	Div 2	42	17	10	15	59	55	44	10th	R5	R3			Brian Joicey	20	17,313
1973–74	Div 2	42	12	11	19	51	63	35	19th	R3	R3			Brian Joicey	20	14,727
1974–75	Div 2 ↓	42	5	11	26	29	64	21	22nd	R3	R1			Eric McMordie	6	13,292
1975–76	Div 3	46	12	16	18	48	59	40	20th (Note: Lowest League finish.)	R3	R1			Mick Prendergast	13	11,068
1976–77	Div 3	46	22	9	15	65	55	53	8th	R2	R4			Rodger Wylde	25	13,470
1977–78	Div 3	46	15	16	15	50	52	46	14th	R2	R4			Tommy Tynan	21	11,423
1978–79	Div 3	46	13	19	14	53	53	45	14th	R3	R2			Brian Hornsby	21	10,643
1979–80	Div 3 ↑	46	21	16	9	81	47	58	3rd	R2	R2			Terry Curran	24	18,090
1980–81	Div 2	42	17	8	17	53	51	42	10th	R3	R3			Andy McCulloch	18	18,403
1981–82	Div 2	42	20	10	12	55	51	70	4th	R3	R2			Gary Bannister	22	19,082
1982–83	Div 2	42	16	15	11	60	47	63	6th	SF	QF			Gary Bannister	22	16,609
1983–84	Div 2 ↑	42	26	10	6	72	34	88	2nd	QF	QF			Gary Bannister	22	22,488
1984–85	Div 1	42	17	14	11	58	45	65	8th	R5	QF			Imre Varadi	21	27,774
1985–86	Div 1	42	21	10	11	63	54	73	5th	SF	R3			Lee Chapman Brian Marwood	15	23,101
1986–87	Div 1	42	13	13	16	58	59	52	13th	QF	R3			Lee Chapman	22	23,172
1987–88	Div 1	40	15	8	17	52	66	53	11th	R3	QF	Football League Centenary Tournament	RU	Lee Chapman	22	19,796
1988–89	Div 1	38	10	12	16	34	51	42	15th	R4	R2			David Hirst	9	20,036
1989–90	Div 1 ↓	38	11	10	17	35	51	43	18th	R4	R3			David Hirst	16	20,927
1990–91	Div 2 ↑	46	22	16	8	80	51	82	3rd	R5	W			David Hirst	32	26,604
1991–92	Div 1	42	21	12	9	62	49	75	3rd	R4	R3			David Hirst	21	29,578
1992–93	Prem	42	15	14	13	55	51	59	7th	RU	RU	UEFA Cup	R2	Mark Bright	18	27,263
1993–94	Prem	42	16	16	10	76	54	64	7th	R4	SF			Mark Bright	23	27,186
1994–95	Prem	42	13	12	17	49	57	51	13th	R4	R4			Mark Bright	13	26,596
1995–96	Prem	38	10	10	18	48	61	40	15th	R3	R4	UEFA Intertoto Cup	GS	David Hirst	14	24,877
1996–97	Prem	38	14	15	9	50	51	57	7th	QF	R2			Andy Booth	13	25,714
1997–98	Prem	38	12	8	18	52	67	44	16th	R4	R2			Paolo Di Canio	14	28,706
1998–99	Prem	38	13	7	18	41	42	46	12th	R5	R2			Benito Carbone	9	26,745
1999–2000	Prem ↓	38	8	7	23	38	70	31	19th	R5	R4			Gilles De Bilde	11	24,855
2000–01	Div 1	46	15	8	23	52	71	53	17th	R4	QF			Gerald Sibon	15	19,268
2001–02	Div 1	46	12	14	20	49	71	50	20th	R3	SF			Gerald Sibon	13	20,870
2002–03	Div 1 ↓	46	10	16	20	56	73	46	22nd	R3	R2			Gerald Sibon	9	20,327
2003–04	Div 2	46	13	14	19	48	64	53	16th	R2	R1	Football League Trophy	F(N)	Guylain Ndumbu-Nsungu	10	22,336
2004–05	Lge 1 ↑	46	19	15	12	77	59	72	5th (Note: Promoted to the Football League Two via the play-offs, beating Brentford 3–1 on aggregate in the semi-final and Hartlepool United 4–2 (after extra time) in the 2005 Football League One play-off final.)	R1	R2	Football League Trophy	R1	Steve MacLean	20	23,107
2005–06	Champ	46	13	13	20	39	52	52	19th	R3	R2			Chris Brunt	7	24,853
2006–07	Champ	46	20	11	15	70	66	71	9th	R3	R1			Deon Burton Steve MacLean	13	23,638
2007–08	Champ	46	14	13	19	54	55	55	16th	R3	R3			Deon Burton	9	21,418
2008–09	Champ	46	16	13	17	51	58	61	12th	R3	R1			Marcus Tudgay	14	21,542
2009–10	Champ ↓	46	11	14	21	49	69	47	22nd	R3	R2			Marcus Tudgay	10	23,179
2010–11	Lge 1	46	16	10	20	67	67	58	15th	R5	R2	Football League Trophy	SF(N)	Neil Mellor	20	17,817
2011–12	Lge 1 ↑	46	28	9	9	81	48	93	2nd	R4	R2	Football League Trophy	R1	Gary Madine	18	21,336
2012–13	Champ	46	16	10	20	53	61	58	18th	R3	R3			Michail Antonio	9	24,078
2013–14	Champ	46	13	14	19	63	65	53	16th	R5	R1			Chris Maguire	10	21,239
2014–15	Champ	46	14	18	14	43	49	60	13th	R3	R3			Atdhe Nuhiu	11	21,991
2015–16	Champ	46	19	17	10	66	45	74	6th (Note: Beat Brighton & Hove Albion 3–1 on aggregate in the semi-final before losing 1–0 to Hull City in the 2016 Football League Championship play-off final.)	R4	QF			Fernando Forestieri	15	22,641
2016–17	Champ	46	24	9	13	60	45	81	4th (Note: Lost in the play-off semi-final to Huddersfield Town 4–3 in a penalty shoot-out after the aggregate score was 1–1.)	R3	R1			Fernando Forestieri	12	27,129
2017–18	Champ	46	14	15	17	59	60	57	15th	R5	R2			Atdhe Nuhiu	14	25,995
2018–19	Champ	46	16	16	14	60	62	64	12th	R4	R2			Steven Fletcher	11	24,429
2019–20	Champ	46	15	11	20	58	66	56	16th	R5	R3			Steven Fletcher	13	23,773
2020–21	Champ ↓	46	12	11	23	40	61	41 (Note: Sheffield Wednesday received a 12 point deduction for breaching the League's Profitability and Sustainability Rules. This was later reduced to 6 points by an Independent League Arbitration panel.)	24th	R4	R3			Josh Windass	10	N/A (Note: All home games in the 2020–21 season were played behind closed doors due to the COVID-19 pandemic.)
2021–22	Lge 1	46	24	13	9	78	50	85	4th (Note: Lost in the play-off semi-final to Sunderland 2–1 on aggregate.)	R1	R1	EFL Trophy	R2	Lee Gregory	17	22,470
2022–23	Lge 1 ↑	46	28	12	6	81	37	96	3rd (Note: Performed the greatest comeback in EFL play-off history to beat Peterborough United in the semi-final, then beat Barnsley 1-0 in extra time in the play-off final.)	R4	R3	EFL Trophy	R1	Michael Smith	21	25,387
2023–24	Champ	46	15	8	23	44	68	53	20th	R4	R2			Anthony Musaba	8	26,762
2024–25	Champ	46	15	13	18	60	69	58	12th	R3	R4			Josh Windass	13	26,636
2025-26	Champ ↓	46	2	12	32	29	89	0 (Note: Sheffield Wednesday entered administration in October and was deducted 12 points as punishment. They were deducted a further 6 points in December for additional late payments, bringing their total penalty to −18 points.)	24th	R3	R3			Jamal Lowe	5	23,199

== Key ==
- Pld – Matches played
- W – Matches won
- D – Matches drawn
- L – Matches lost
- GF – Goals for
- GA – Goals against
- Pts – Points
- Pos – Final position
- Prem – Premier League
- Champ – EFL Championship
- Lge 1 – EFL League One
- Div 1 – Football League First Division
- Div 2 – Football League Second Division
- Div 3 – Football League Third Division
- Alliance – Football Alliance
- n/a – Not applicable
- GS – Group stage
- R1 – First round
- R2 – Second round
- R3 – Third round
- R4 – Fourth round
- R5 – Fifth round
- QF – Quarter-finals
- SF – Semi-finals
- F – Regional finals
- RU – Runners-up
- W – Winners
- (N) – Northern section of regionalised stage

Champions	Runners-up	Third Place	Promoted	Relegated	Play-offs
