= List of Sheffield Wednesday F.C. records and statistics =

These are Sheffield Wednesday F.C. records. They cover all competitive matches dating back to the team's first appearance in the FA Cup in 1880.

== Record games ==
Record	Against	Ground	Date
Biggest Football League Win	Birmingham City	Hillsborough Stadium	13 December 1930 (Division 1)	9–1
Heaviest Football League Defeat	Aston Villa	Villa Park	5 October 1912 (Division 1)	0–10
Biggest Cup Win:	Halliwell	Olive Grove	17 January 1891 (FA Cup Round 1)	12–0
Heaviest Cup Defeat:	Blackburn Rovers	Kennington Oval	29 March 1890 (FA Cup Final)	1–6
Highest Home Attendance (all-time):	Manchester City	Hillsborough Stadium	17 February 1934 (FA Cup Round 5)	72,841

== Seasonal records ==
Record	Season	Total
Most goals scored in a Football League season:	1958–59 (Division 2)	106
Record Football League points total (3 points for a win)	2022–23 (League 1)	96
Record Football League points total (2 points for a win)	1958–59 (Division 2)	62

== Record runs ==
All records relate to league games only

Record	Began	Finished	Games
Winning run	23 April 1904	15 October 1904	9
Losing run	1 January 2026	7 March 2026	13
Unbeaten run	08 October 2022	17 March 2023	23
Games without a win	21 September 2025	2 May 2026	39
Sequence of draws	24 October 1992	28 November 1992	5

== Players ==
=== General ===
Record	Player	Date(s)	Total
Most Football League Appearances	Andrew Wilson	1900–1920	501
Most Consecutive League and Cup Appearances	Martin Hodge	1983–1987	214
Most Goals Scored in a Match	Douglas Hunt v Norwich	19 November 1938 (Division 2)	6 Goals
Highest goalscorer in a Football League season	Derek Dooley	Division 2, 1951–52	46
Most Capped Player (whilst at club):	Nigel Worthington		50
Youngest Player Ever	Peter Fox	31 March 1973 v Leyton Orient	15 years 269 days
Oldest Player Ever:	Jerry Jackson	27 August 1923 v Port Vale	46 Years

=== Transfers ===
Record	Player	Club	Date	Fee
Highest Fee Paid	Jordan Rhodes	Middlesbrough	1 July 2017	£8M
Highest Fee Received	Lucas Joao	Reading	6 August 2019	£6.57M

=== Appearances and goals ===
As of 20 November 2026

Pos	Player	Years	Appearances
1.	(Scotland) Andrew Wilson	1900–1920	546
2.	(Scotland) Liam Palmer	2010–Present	524
3.	(England) Jack Brown	1922–1937	507
4.	(England) Alan Finney	1949–1965	504
5.	(Scotland) Barry Bannan	2015–2026, 2026–	496
6.	(England) Kevin Pressman	1985–2004	478
7.	(England) Tommy Crawshaw	1894–1908	465
8.	(England) Redfern Froggatt	1942–1960	458
9.	(England) Don Megson	1952–1970	442
10.	(England) John Fantham	1956–1969	434

Pos	Player	Goals scored	Average
1.	(Scotland) Andrew Wilson	217	0.40
2.	(England) John Fantham	167	0.38
3.	(England) David Hirst	149	0.41
4.	(England) Redfern Froggatt	149	0.33
5.	(England) Ellis Rimmer	140	0.33
6.	(England) Mark Hooper	136	0.32
7.	(England) Fred Spiksley	114	0.36
8.	(England) Jimmy Trotter	114	0.71
9.	(Scotland) David McLean	100	0.68
10.	(England) Harry Chapman	99	0.33

=== Highest average attendance in a season ===
Division	Average attendance	Season
Division 1/Premier League	42,520	1952–53
Division 2	41,682	1951–52
Division 3	25,431	2022-23

== Honours ==
=== Top tier ===
Honour	Year(s)
Football Alliance Champions	1890
FA Cup Winners	1896, 1907, 1935
FA Cup Runners-up	1890, 1966, 1993
Football League First Division Champions	1903, 1904, 1929, 1930
FA Charity Shield	1935
Football League Cup Winners	1991
Football League Cup Runners-up	1993

=== Lower tier ===
Honour	Year(s)
Football League Second Division Champions	1900, 1926, 1952, 1956, 1959
Football League Second Division Runners-up	1950, 1984
Football League One Runners-up	2012
Football League One Play-off winners	2005, 2023

=== Local ===
Honour	Year(s)
Cromwell Cup Winners	1867
Sheffield FA Challenge Cup	1877, 1878, 1881, 1883, 1887, 1888
Wharncliffe Charity Cup	1879, 1882, 1883, 1886, 1888,
Sheffield and Hallamshire County Cup	1927, 1928, 1929, 1932, 1934, 1939 (shared with Sheffield United), 1945, 1946, 1950, 1951, 1953, 1973, 1975
