= 1960–61 Sheffield Wednesday F.C. season =

English football club season

Sheffield Wednesday F.C.
1960–61 season
- Chairman: Andrew Stephen
- Manager: Harry Catterick
- Stadium: Hillsborough Stadium
- First Division: 2nd
- FA Cup: Quarter-finals
- Top goalscorer: League: John Fantham (20); All: John Fantham (23)
- Highest home attendance: 56,363 vs Tottenham Hotspur, League, 12 November 1960
- Lowest home attendance: 21,115 vs Preston North End, League, 4 February 1961
- Average home league attendance: 31,224

During the 1960–61 English football season, Sheffield Wednesday F.C. competed in the Football League First Division.

== Season summary ==
In the 1960–61 season, the Owls had an excellent campaign, reaching the last eight of the FA Cup and finishing 2nd place in the league, 8 points behind champions Tottenham Hotspur.

== Final league table ==
Pos	Team	Pld	W	D	L	GF	GA	GAv	Pts	Qualification or relegation
1	Tottenham Hotspur (C)	42	31	4	7	115	55	2.091	66	Qualification for the European Cup preliminary round
2	Sheffield Wednesday	42	23	12	7	78	47	1.660	58	Qualification for the Inter-Cities Fairs Cup first round
3	Wolverhampton Wanderers	42	25	7	10	103	75	1.373	57	
4	Burnley	42	22	7	13	102	77	1.325	51	
5	Everton	42	22	6	14	87	69	1.261	50	

Source: World Football
Rules for classification: 1) Points; 2) Goal average; 3) Goals scored
(C) Champions

== Results ==
Sheffield Wednesday's score comes first

=== Legend ===
Win	Draw	Loss

=== FA Cup ===
Round	Date	Opponent	Venue	Result	Attendance	Goalscorers
R3	7 January 1961	Leeds United	H	2–0	36,225	Quinn 33'; Ellis 84'
R4	28 January 1961	Manchester United	H	1–1	58,000	Wilkinson 14'
R4R	1 February 1961	Manchester United	A	7–2	65,243	Fantham 2', 52'; Finney 30', 80'; Ellis 32', 38', 64'
R5	18 February 1961	Leyton Orient	A	2–0	31,000	Ellis, Fantham
QF	4 March 1961	Burnley	H	0–0	55,000	
QFR	7 March 1961	Burnley	A	0–2	49,113	

== Squad ==
Note: Flags indicate national team as defined under FIFA eligibility rules; some limited exceptions apply. Players may hold more than one non-FIFA nationality.

Pos.	Nation	Player
GK	ENG	Ron Springett
DF	ENG	Peter Johnson
DF	ENG	Peter Swan
DF	ENG	Don Megson
MF	ENG	Alan Finney
MF	ENG	Tony Kay
MF	SCO	Tom McAnearney
FW	ENG	John Fantham
FW	SCO	Bobby Craig
FW	ENG	Keith Ellis
MF	ENG	Derek Wilkinson

Pos.	Nation	Player
MF	ENG	John Quinn
FW	ENG	Billy Griffin
MF	ENG	Ralph O'Donnell
DF	ENG	Gerry Young
DF	ENG	Brian Hill
GK	SCO	Roy MacLaren
MF	ENG	Bobby Lodge
DF	SCO	Jack Martin
DF	SCO	John Frye
MF	ENG	John Meredith
