= Steel City derby =

Association football match in Sheffield, England

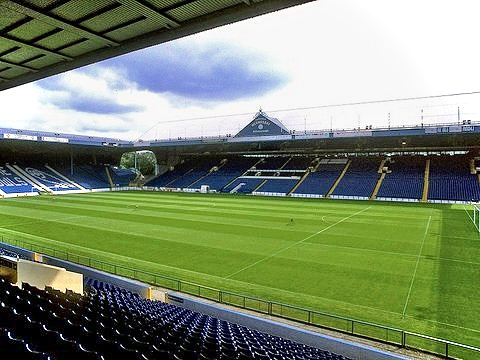
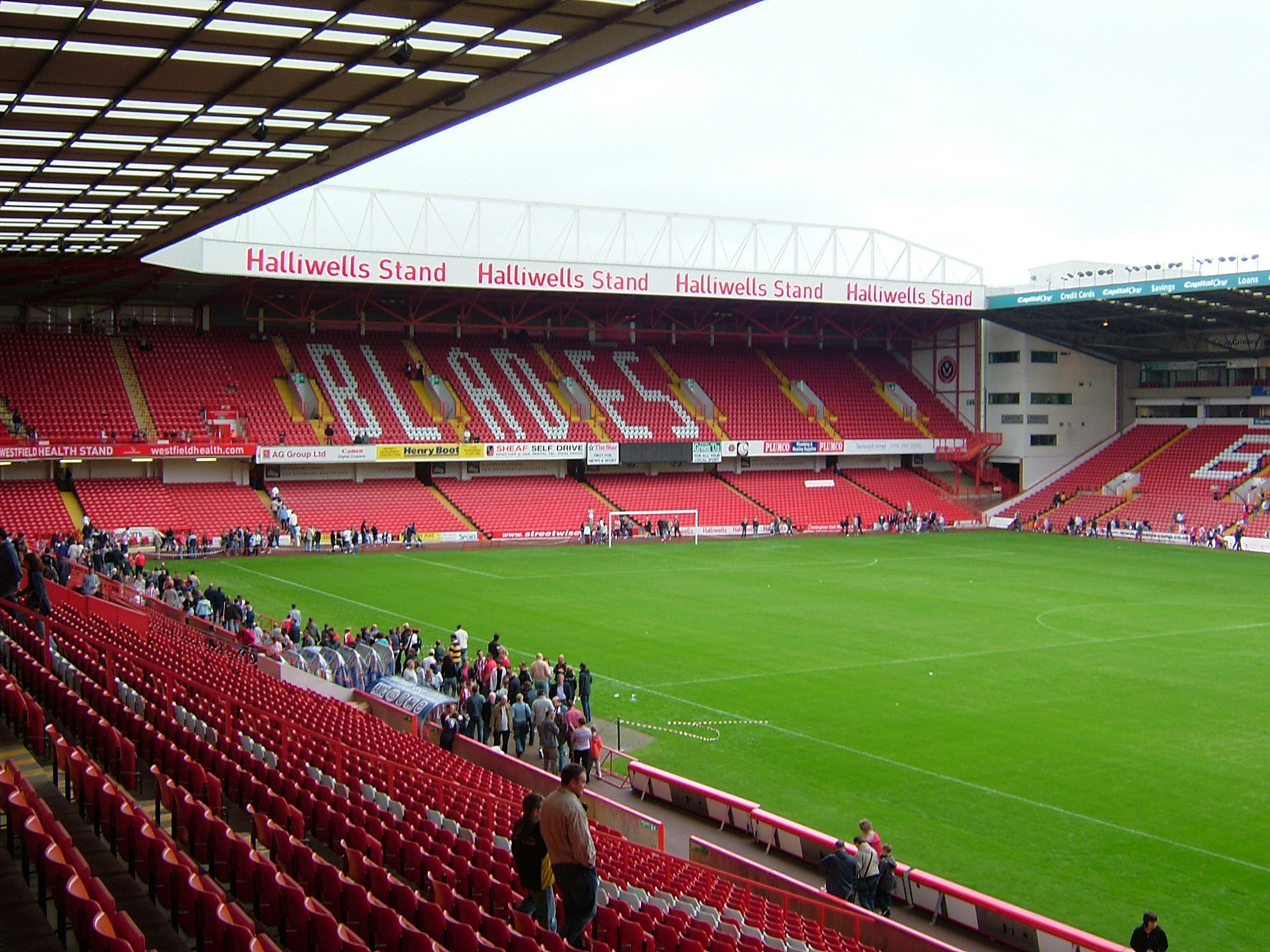
- The home stadiums of Wednesday and United in Sheffield
- Other names: Blades vs Owls; United vs Wednesday (vice-versa)
- Location: Sheffield, South Yorkshire
- Teams: Sheffield United; Sheffield Wednesday
- First meeting: 23 April 1891; Wharncliffe Charity Cup; The Wednesday 2–1 Sheffield United
- Latest meeting: 22 February 2026; EFL Championship; United 2–1 Wednesday
- Stadiums: Bramall Lane (Sheffield United); Hillsborough Stadium (Sheffield Wednesday)

Statistics
- Total meetings: 148
- Most wins: Sheffield United (53)
- All-time series: United: 53; Drawn: 47; Wednesday: 48

The Steel City derby, or the Sheffield derby is a local derby between Sheffield United and Sheffield Wednesday, the two professional football league teams in the city of Sheffield, England.

As of 22 February 2026, the teams have met 148 times in competitive games, with United winning 53 and Wednesday 48.

The derby returned for the 2024–25 and 2025–26 seasons following United's relegation from the Premier League, however Wednesday's relegation from The Championship in 2025–26 means that the date of the next meeting between the sides is unclear.

United currently hold an eight game unbeaten run in the fixture, including four wins in the last four derby matches.

== History ==
The teams first met on 15 December 1890 at Wednesday's Olive Grove ground, with The Wednesday playing a friendly match against the newly formed Sheffield United that the home team won 2–1.

The first competitive Steel City Derby fixture took place on 16 October 1893 during the 1893–94 English First Division season (following United's promotion to the First Division the previous season), it ended 1–1.

Most Steel City derbies have taken place in the top two tiers of English football, with only two seasons (1979–80 and 2011–12) featuring both teams in the third tier.

Alan Quinn became the first player to score a goal for both clubs in a Steel City derby match. He scored for Sheffield Wednesday in their 3–1 defeat to United at Bramall Lane in February 2003. He signed to United from Wednesday in 2004 and scored the winning goal for Sheffield United in a 1–0 win over Sheffield Wednesday at Bramall Lane on 4 December 2005.

== Head-to-head statistics ==
As of 22 February 2026

Competition	Games played	United wins	Drawn games	Wednesday wins	United goals	Wednesday goals
League	122	47	39	36	168	150
FA Cup	9	3	3	3	14	13
EFL Cup	3	0	1	2	2	5
Full Members' Cup	1	0	0	1	2	3
Total (official)	135	50	43	42	186	171
Wharncliffe Charity Cup	1	0	0	1	1	2
Football League (Midland Section)	12	3	4	5	15	23
Total (overall)	148	53	47	48	201	196

== Honours ==
Competition	United	Wednesday
First Division	1	4
Second Division	1	5
League One	1	0
Fourth Division	1	N/A
FA Cup	4	3
EFL Cup	0	1
FA Charity Shield	N/A	1
Total	8	14

== Comparative table positions ==
Comparative table positions of Sheffield United and Wednesday in the English football league system

== Matches played ==
League
Season	Division	Tier	United vs Wednesday				Wednesday vs United			
Season	Division	Tier	Date	Venue	Score	Atten.	Date	Venue	Score	Atten.
1893–94	First Division	1	16 October 1893	Bramall Lane	1–1		13 November 1893	Olive Grove	1–2	
1894–95	First Division	1	12 January 1895	Bramall Lane	1–0		27 October 1894	Olive Grove	2–3	
1895–96	First Division	1	26 December 1895	Bramall Lane	1–1		7 September 1896	Olive Grove	1–0	
1896–97	First Division	1	26 December 1896	Bramall Lane	2–0		2 March 1897	Olive Grove	1–1	
1897–98	First Division	1	27 December 1897	Bramall Lane	1–1		16 October 1897	Olive Grove	0–1	
1898–99	First Division	1	26 December 1898	Bramall Lane	2–1		3 October 1899	Hillsborough	1–1	
1900–01	First Division	1	15 December 1900	Bramall Lane	1–0		29 April 1901	Hillsborough	1–0	
1901–02	First Division	1	1 March 1902	Bramall Lane	3–0		2 November 1901	Hillsborough	1–0	
1902–03	First Division	1	1 September 1902	Bramall Lane	2–3		11 October 1903	Hillsborough	0–1	
1903–04	First Division	1	12 December 1903	Bramall Lane	1–1		9 April 1904	Hillsborough	3–0	
1904–05	First Division	1	8 April 1905	Bramall Lane	4–2		10 December 1904	Hillsborough	1–3	
1905–06	First Division	1	21 October 1905	Bramall Lane	0–2		18 April 1906	Hillsborough	1–0	
1906–07	First Division	1	4 May 1907	Bramall Lane	2–1		3 November 1906	Hillsborough	2–2	
1907–08	First Division	1	9 November 1907	Bramall Lane	1–3		7 March 1908	Hillsborough	2–0	
1908–09	First Division	1	26 December 1908	Bramall Lane	2–1			Hillsborough	1–0	
1909–10	First Division	1	6 November 1909	Bramall Lane	3–3		19 March 1910	Hillsborough	1–3	
1910–11	First Division	1	25 February 1911	Bramall Lane	0–1		22 October 1910	Hillsborough	2–0	
1911–12	First Division	1	4 November 1911	Bramall Lane	1–1		9 March 1912	Hillsborough	1–1	
1912–13	First Division	1	1 March 1913	Bramall Lane	0–2		26 October 1912	Hillsborough	1–0	
1913–14	First Division	1	25 October 1913	Bramall Lane	0–1		28 February 1914	Hillsborough	2–1	
1914–15	First Division	1	4 September 1914	Bramall Lane	0–1		2 January 1915	Hillsborough	1–1	
1919–20	First Division	1	4 October 1919	Bramall Lane	3–0		27 September 1919	Hillsborough	2–1	
1926–27	First Division	1	15 January 1927	Bramall Lane	2–0		28 August 1926	Hillsborough	2–3	
1927–28	First Division	1		Bramall Lane	1–1			Hillsborough	3–3	
1928–29	First Division	1	2 February 1929	Bramall Lane	1–1		22 September 1928	Hillsborough	5–2	
1929–30	First Division	1	28 September 1929	Bramall Lane	2–2	47,038	1 February 1930	Hillsborough	1–1	54,459
1930–31	First Division	1	6 September 1930	Bramall Lane	1–1	36,738	3 January 1931	Hillsborough	1–3	33,322
1931–32	First Division	1	2 April 1932	Bramall Lane	1–1	37,872	21 November 1931	Hillsborough	2–1	25,823
1932–33	First Division	1	4 February 1933	Bramall Lane	2–3	32,608	24 September 1932	Hillsborough	3–3	24,804
1933–34	First Division	1	3 March 1934	Bramall Lane	5–1	32,318	21 October 1933	Hillsborough	0–1	28,049
1937–38	Second Division	2	26 February 1938	Bramall Lane	2–1	50,827	16 October 1937	Hillsborough	0–1	51,893
1938–39	Second Division	2	29 October 1938	Bramall Lane	0–0	44,909	4 March 1939	Hillsborough	1–0	48,891
1949–50	Second Division	2	21 January 1950	Bramall Lane	2–0	51,644	17 September 1949	Hillsborough	2–1	55,555
1951–52	Second Division	2	8 September 1951	Bramall Lane	7–3	52,045	5 January 1952	Hillsborough	1–3	65,384
1953–54	First Division	1	12 September 1953	Bramall Lane	2–0	45,463	23 January 1954	Hillsborough	3–2	43,231
1954–55	First Division	1	18 September 1954	Bramall Lane	1–0	37,308	5 February 1955	Hillsborough	1–2	36,176
1958–59	Second Division	2	21 February 1959	Bramall Lane	1–0	43,919	4 October 1958	Hillsborough	2–0	46,404
1961–62	First Division	1	16 September 1961	Bramall Lane	1–0	38,497	3 February 1962	Hillsborough	1–2	50,937
1962–63	First Division	1	6 October 1962	Bramall Lane	2–2	42,687	15 May 1963	Hillsborough	3–1	41,585
1963–64	First Division	1	14 September 1963	Bramall Lane	1–1	35,276	18 January 1964	Hillsborough	3–0	42,898
1964–65	First Division	1	2 January 1965	Bramall Lane	2–3	37,190	5 September 1964	Hillsborough	0–2	32,684
1965–66	First Division	1	18 September 1965	Bramall Lane	1–0	35,655	12 March 1966	Hillsborough	2–2	34,045
1966–67	First Division	1	4 February 1966	Bramall Lane	1–0	43,490	24 September 1967	Hillsborough	2–2	43,557
1967–68	First Division	1	2 September 1967	Bramall Lane	0–1	36,258	6 January 1968	Hillsborough	1–1	43,020
1970–71	Second Division	2	3 October 1970	Bramall Lane	3–2	39,983	12 April 1971	Hillsborough	0–0	47,592
1979–80	Third Division	3	5 April 1980	Bramall Lane	1–1	45,156	26 December 1979	Hillsborough	4–0	49,309
1991–92	First Division	1	17 November 1991	Bramall Lane	2–0	31,832	11 March 1992	Hillsborough	1–3	40,327
1992–93	Premier League	1	8 November 1992	Bramall Lane	1–1	30,039	21 April 1993	Hillsborough	1–1	38,688
1993–94	Premier League	1	23 October 1993	Bramall Lane	1–1	30,044	22 January 1994	Hillsborough	3–1	34,959
2000–01	First Division	2	16 December 2000	Bramall Lane	1–1	25,156	1 April 2001	Hillsborough	1–2	38,433
2001–02	First Division	2	29 January 2002	Bramall Lane	0–0	29,364	7 October 2001	Hillsborough	0–0	29,281
2002–03	First Division	2	17 January 2003	Bramall Lane	3–1	28,179	1 September 2002	Hillsborough	2–0	27,075
2005–06	Championship	2	3 December 2005	Bramall Lane	1–0	30,558	18 February 2006	Hillsborough	1–2	33,439
2007–08	Championship	2	8 April 2008	Bramall Lane	2–2	31,760	19 January 2008	Hillsborough	2–0	30,486
2008–09	Championship	2	7 February 2009	Bramall Lane	1–2	30,786	19 October 2008	Hillsborough	1–0	30,441
2009–10	Championship	2	18 September 2009	Bramall Lane	3–2	29,210	18 April 2010	Hillsborough	1–1	35,485
2011–12	League One	3	16 October 2011	Bramall Lane	2–2	28,136	26 February 2012	Hillsborough	1–0	36,364
2017–18	Championship	2	12 January 2018	Bramall Lane	0–0	31,120	24 September 2017	Hillsborough	2–4	32,839
2018–19	Championship	2	9 November 2018	Bramall Lane	0–0	30,261	4 March 2019	Hillsborough	0–0	31,630
2024–25	Championship	2	10 November 2024	Bramall Lane	1–0	31,127	16 March 2025	Hillsborough	0–1	33,827
2025–26	Championship	2	22 February 2026	Bramall Lane	2–1	30,457	23 November 2025	Hillsborough	0–3	32,740

Cup
Season	Competition	Round	Date	Venue	Score	Atten.
1899–1900	FA Cup	2nd Round	17 February 1900	Bramall Lane	1–1	28,374
1899–1900	FA Cup	2nd Round Replay	19 February 1900	Hillsborough	0–2	23,000
1924–25	FA Cup	2nd Round	31 January 1925	Bramall Lane	3–2	40,256
1927–28	FA Cup	5th Round	18 February 1928	Hillsborough	1–1	57,076
1927–28	FA Cup	5th Round Replay	22 February 1928	Bramall Lane	4–1	59,447
1953–54	FA Cup	3rd Round	9 January 1954	Hillsborough	1–1	61,250
1953–54	FA Cup	3rd Round Replay	13 January 1954	Bramall Lane	1–3	40,847
1959–60	FA Cup	6th Round	12 March 1960	Bramall Lane	0–2	61,180
1980–81	League Cup	1st Round first leg	9 August 1980	Bramall Lane	1–1	25,588
1980–81	League Cup	1st Round second leg	12 August 1980	Hillsborough	2–0	23,989
1989–90	Full Members' Cup	2nd Round	21 November 1989	Hillsborough	3–2	30,464
1992–93	FA Cup	Semi-final	3 April 1993	Wembley Stadium	2–1	75,364
2000–01	League Cup	3rd Round	1 November 2000	Hillsborough	2–1	32,283

== Non-competitive matches ==
Eligible games – Friendlies
Venue	Date	Attendance	Competition	Winner	Score	Notes
Olive Grove	15 December 1890	10,000	Friendly	Wednesday	2–1	First ever meeting between the two sides
Bramall Lane	12 January 1891	15,000	Friendly	United	3–2	First United win
Olive Grove	23 April 1891	3,250	Wharncliffe Charity Cup	Wednesday	2–1	Tournament went uncompleted
Olive Grove	17 October 1892	1,500	Friendly	Drawn	1–1	First drawn game
Hillsborough	9 August 1994	13,724	Steel City Challenge Trophy	United	2–3	Inaugural match for the trophy
Bramall Lane	5 August 1995	13,254	Steel City Challenge Trophy	Wednesday	1–3	Last meeting between the sides under Dave Bassett's time at United
Bramall Lane	27 August 1996	7,271	Steel City Challenge Trophy	United	4–1	Last non-competitive match

== Famous matches ==
The most famous match at Bramall Lane was on 8 September 1951, an encounter United won 7–3 in front of a crowd of 51,075. Wednesday scored after just ninety seconds through Thomas, but goals from Derek Hawksworth and Harold Brook gave United a 2–1 interval lead which would have been greater if McIntosh in the Wednesday goal had not saved a Fred Furniss penalty. Dennis Woodhead equalised for Wednesday after sixty minutes, but in rapid succession, Alf Ringstead, Hawksworth and Ringstead again, and Fred Smith scored for United, Woodhead pulled one back for Wednesday before Brook made the score 7–3.

In February 1967, broadcasting history was made when the derby at Bramall Lane was shown live on Pay-TV. United’s Bill Punton scored the only goal in the first pay-per-view League game on British television, and only the second to be televised live. The coverage was available to around 700 subscribers in the Sheffield area, who had to pay ten shillings (50p) for the privilege of watching.

The "Boxing Day Massacre" was a match played on 26 December 1979. Sheffield Wednesday won 4–0, with goals from Ian Mellor, Terry Curran, Mark Smith and Jeff King. The United side at the time were top of the league, while Wednesday were 4th in the table. Sheffield Wednesday were promoted at the end of the season.

The two teams met in the 1992–93 FA Cup semi-finals. The game was scheduled to be played at Elland Road while the other semi-final between North London rivals Arsenal and Tottenham Hotspur was to be played at Wembley. However The Football Association was forced to move the Steel City derby to Wembley due to extreme pressure from the fans of both teams. The match itself proved to be a classic, with Wednesday winning 2–1 after extra time. Chris Waddle and Mark Bright scoring for Wednesday, and Alan Cork scoring for United. The match was watched by 75,364 spectators.

The match at Hillsborough on 24 September 2017, saw United claim their then biggest win at Hillsborough with a 4–2 victory in front of a crowd of 32,839. Goals for United came from John Fleck in the 3rd minute, Mark Duffy in the 67th minute, and two (in the 15th and 77th minute respectively) from Leon Clarke against his former side, with Gary Hooper in the 47th minute (scored in the first half as two minutes were added on) and Lucas Joao (65') scoring for Wednesday. This game was nicknamed the 'Bouncing Day Massacre' by the United fans, due to a chant by the Wednesday fans following Joao's goal that ended abruptly as a result of Mark Duffy's goal shortly afterwards.

On 22 February 2026 Wednesday were condemned to the earliest relegation in EFL history following a 2–1 derby win for United at Bramall Lane. Wednesday had a negative points tally with only a solitary win all season, having suffered a chaotic campaign which saw them put into administration by controversial owner Dejphon Chansiri and be deducted 18 points by the EFL. Goals from Patrick Bamford and Harrison Burrows sealed the Owls' fate, returning the club to League One after three seasons in the Championship.

== Resurgence in the Steel City derby ==
After Sheffield Wednesday's relegation from the Premier League after the 1999–2000 season both teams frequented the same league for seven of the next ten years. This caused the local rivalry between the two teams to increase and to cause an emergence of crowd trouble in 2003, 2008 and 2019.

Before the 2000–01 season both teams were only in the same league for six seasons between 1970–71 and 1999–00 (twenty-nine seasons), although this period did see one FA Cup semi-final meeting in 1993 and a Zenith Data Cup (Full Members Cup) meeting in 1989.

== Off-pitch relationship ==
Supporters of the two Sheffield clubs have a fierce but healthy relationship. This goes right back to 1889 after Sheffield Wednesday, formed in 1867, had vacated Bramall Lane due to a dispute over rent. To compensate for the loss in revenue, the Cricket committee took the decision to form another football club, thus Sheffield United were established and Bramall Lane subsequently became their home.

The clubs themselves do appear to have an amicable relationship, and on 15 July 2011 both Sheffield United and Sheffield Wednesday held a joint conference called "Supporting Sheffield" in which they announced a joint shirt sponsorship deal with two local Sheffield based companies for the 2011–12 League One season. The two local sponsors were Westfield Health (a Not for Profit healthcare organisation), who were the home kit sponsor for the Blades and the away kit sponsor for the Owls, and the Gilder Group (a Volkswagen car dealer), who were the away kit sponsor for the Blades and the home kit sponsor for the Owls. United and Wednesday both made a six figure sum from the sponsorship deal. The deal was the first of its kind in English football with The Telegraph likening the deal to Glasgow rivals and neighbours Celtic and Rangers who have frequently shared shirt sponsors in the past.

== Played or managed for both clubs ==
Players to have played for both clubs:

- Earl Barrett
- Louie Barry
- Danny Batth
- Carl Bradshaw
- Leigh Bromby
- Franz Carr
- Leon Clarke
- Richard Cresswell
- Terry Curran
- David Ford
- Derek Geary
- Paul Heald
- Ben Heneghan
- David Johnson
- Marvin Johnson
- Caolan Lavery
- Max Lowe
- Gary Madine
- Brian Marwood
- David McGoldrick
- Jon-Paul McGovern
- Mark McGuinness
- Tony McMahon
- Nathaniel Mendez-Laing
- Owen Morrison
- Joe Mattock
- Chris O'Grady
- Alan Quinn
- Neil Ramsbottom
- Carl Robinson
- Wilf Rostron
- Bernard Shaw
- Simon Stainrod
- Keith Treacy
- Imre Varadi
- Alan Warboys
- Dean Windass

Scored in the derby match for both clubs:

- Alan Quinn

100+ appearances for both clubs:

- Leigh Bromby

Managed both clubs:

- Steve Bruce (Managed United first, later Wednesday)
- Danny Wilson (Managed Wednesday first, later United)

Played for United, managed Wednesday:

- Steve Bruce

Played for Wednesday, managed United:

- Nigel Clough
- Teddy Davison
- Ian Porterfield
- Paul Heckingbottom

Played for one, coached the other:

- Sam Ellis
- Phil Henson
- James Beattie
- Mike Trusson
- Alan Hodgkinson

Coached both teams:

- Frank Barlow
- Danny Bergara
- Willie Donachie
- Adam Owen

Other connections:

- Derek Dooley, played for and managed Wednesday and was then had a variety of roles at United including Commercial Manager, Managing Director, Chairman and Vice President
- John Harris, managed United and scouted for Wednesday
