= Hugh McJarrow =

Scottish footballer (1928–1987)

Hugh McJarrow (29 January 1928 – 25 July 1987) was a Scottish professional footballer whose career lasted between 1946 and the early 1960s. He played League football for Chesterfield, Sheffield Wednesday, Luton Town and Plymouth Argyle. He also played Non-League football for Peterborough United and Matlock Town. McJarrow was primarily a forward player who had fine heading ability, although he did play as a wing half later in his career.

== Career ==
McJarrow was born in Newarthill, near Motherwell in Scotland on 29 January 1928, as a youth he played for Maryhill F.C. junior team, however further development as a footballer was curtailed by the outbreak of World War II and towards the end of the conflict he worked as a Bevin Boy in the local coal mines. In the summer of 1946 McJarrow signed as a professional footballer with Chesterfield, making a goalscoring debut in September of that year against Tottenham Hotspur, playing at inside forward. The young McJarrow was not a regular in the Chesterfield team over the next three season, making 33 appearances and scoring 11 goals, however a switch to centre forward at the start of the 1949–50 season saw him score five goals in the first three games of the campaign which drew the attention of bigger clubs.

McJarrow eventually signed for Sheffield Wednesday for a fee of £4,500, in early March 1950, with an agreement being reached at the England v Netherlands B international at St James' Park, Newcastle on 22 February after Wednesday had failed in a bold bid to sign George Robledo. McJarrow made his Wednesday debut on 4 March 1950 in a goalless away draw at QPR, he played 12 games in all in the remainder of that season, scoring five goals and helping Wednesday gain promotion back to Division One, narrowly pipping local rivals Sheffield United. Amongst those five goals were two in a 5–2 win against Leeds United on 25 March.

The following season (1950–51) back in Division One saw Wednesday struggle and were eventually relegated, McJarrow ended the season with 14 goals from 31 matches and was joint top scorer with Dennis Woodhead and Redfern Froggatt. All of his goals were scored in the first half of the season and he eventually lost his place in early March as Wednesday tried various attacking options in an effort to avoid relegation and Winger Woodhead was ultimately used as an emergency centre forward for the final nine games of the season. McJarrow played three of the first ten game of the 1951–52 season before losing his place permanently as a young Derek Dooley burst onto the scene to score 47 goals that season. McJarrow was confined to the reserve team before signing for Luton Town for a fee of £5,300.

McJarrow had a disappointing time at Luton playing only 15 league games in 22 months, however he did score 10 goals in those games. In December 1953 he signed for Plymouth Argyle and once more was unable to command a regular place in the first team making only 33 appearances and scoring four goals in two and a half years at Home Park, during his time at Plymouth he switched to playing at wing half and turned in some good performances. McJarrow's career came to an end in non league football, he had a short spell at Peterborough United playing two games in the Midland League in May 1957. He then signed for Matlock Town for the 1957–58 season, the team finished fifth in the Central Alliance league but McJarrow was offered reduced terms at the end of the season and moved on to finish his career playing amateur football in Derbyshire for Clay Cross and Danesmoor Miners Welfare and then Chesterfield Tube Works.

McJarrow died in Brigstock, Northamptonshire on 25 July 1987, at the age of 59. He was survived by his wife Barbara McJarrow (died 2022) and his two sons.
