= Sheffield Wednesday F.C. in European football =

English club in European football

- Club: Sheffield Wednesday
- Seasons played: 4
- Most appearances: Alan Finney (10); Don Megson (10); Ron Springett (10); Peter Swan (10)
- Top scorer: Johnny Fantham (5); David Layne (5)
- First entry: 1961–62 Inter-Cities Fairs Cup
- Latest entry: 1995 UEFA Intertoto Cup

Sheffield Wednesday Football Club is an English football club based in Sheffield, South Yorkshire. The club was founded in 1867 and has competed in the English football league system since 1892. They have taken part in UEFA-sanctioned cup competition on four occasions.

== History ==
=== 1961–62 Inter-Cities Fairs Cup ===
As league runners-up in the 1960–61 season, Wednesday were invited to compete for the Inter-Cities Fairs Cup the following season. They knocked out Lyon and Roma before succumbing to Barcelona in the quarter-finals. Had they won, they would have faced Red Star Belgrade in the semi-finals.

Round	Opposition	Score
Last 32	(France) Lyon	5–2 (Home, Hillsborough); 2–4 (Away, Stade de Gerland); Sheffield Wednesday win 7–6 on aggregate
Last 16	(Italy) Roma	4–0 (Home, Hillsborough); 0–1 (Away, Stadio Olimpico); Sheffield Wednesday win 4–1 on aggregate
Quarter-Final	(Spain) Barcelona	3–2 (Home, Hillsborough); 0–2 (Away, Camp Nou); Barcelona win 3–4 on aggregate

First Round

12 September 1961

Lyon (France)	4–2	(England) Sheffield Wednesday
Rambert 19'; N'Jo Léa 22' 38'; Combin 90'		Young 48'; Ellis 63'

Stade de Gerland, Lyon
Attendance: 5,000

4 October 1961

Sheffield Wednesday (England)	5–2	(France) Lyon
Fantham 9' 85'; Griffin 14'; McAnearney 20' (pen.); Dobson 78'		Salen 6'; Djorkaeff 81'

Hillsborough Stadium, Sheffield
Attendance: 30,303

Wednesday won 7–6 on aggregate.

Second Round

29 November 1961

Sheffield Wednesday (England)	4–0	(Italy) Roma
Fantham 6'; Young 33' 35' 79'

Hillsborough Stadium, Sheffield
Attendance: 42,589

13 December 1961

Roma (Italy)	1–0	(England) Sheffield Wednesday
Swan 80' (o.g.)

Stadio Olimpico, Rome
Attendance: 45,000

Wednesday won 4–1 on aggregate.

Quarter-Finals

28 February 1962

Sheffield Wednesday (England)	3–2	(Spain) Barcelona
Fantham 28' 50'; Finney 43'		Villaverde 14'; Evaristo 30'

Hillsborough Stadium, Sheffield
Attendance: 28,956

28 March 1962

Barcelona (Spain)	2–0	(England) Sheffield Wednesday
Evaristo 11'; Kocsis 23'

Camp Nou, Barcelona
Attendance: 75,000

Barcelona won 4–3 on aggregate.

=== 1963–64 Inter-Cities Fairs Cup ===
Two years after their inaugural European campaign, Wednesday were again invited to compete in the Inter-Cities Fairs Cup, after a sixth place league finish. They overcame Dutch part-timers DOS Utrecht in the first round before losing out to Cologne in the next.

Round	Opposition	Score
1	(Netherlands) DOS Utrecht	4–1 (H), 4–1 (A)
2	(Germany) Cologne	1–2 (H), 2–3 (A)

First Round

25 September 1963

DOS Utrecht (Netherlands)	1–4	(England) Sheffield Wednesday
Westphaal 65'		Holliday 5'; Layne 20'; Quinn 49'; Minals 64' (o.g.)

Stadion Galgenwaard, Utrecht
Attendance: 15,000

15 October 1963

Sheffield Wednesday (England)	4–1	(Netherlands) DOS Utrecht
Layne 5' 52' 70'; Dobson 14'		van de Bogert 87'

Hillsborough Stadium, Sheffield
Attendance: 20,643

Wednesday won 8–2 on aggregate.

Second Round

6 November 1963

Cologne (Germany)	3–2	(England) Sheffield Wednesday
Müller 28'; Hornig 35'; Sturm 44'		Pearson 80' 86'

Müngersdorfer Stadion, Cologne
Attendance: 15,000

27 November 1963

Sheffield Wednesday (England)	1–2	(Germany) Cologne
Layne 16'		Thielen 59'; Overath 66'

Hillsborough Stadium, Sheffield
Attendance: 36,929

Cologne won 5–3 on aggregate.

=== 1992–93 UEFA Cup ===
Wednesday qualified for the 1992-93 UEFA Cup following a 3rd-place finish in the 1991-92 First Division. They comfortably progressed against Luxembourg minnows Spora before bowing out to Kaiserslautern in a feisty two-legged Second Round affair.

Round	Opposition	Score
1	Spora Luxembourg	8–1 (H), 2–1 (A)
2	(Germany) Kaiserslautern	2–2 (H), 1–3 (A)

First Round

16 September 1992

Sheffield Wednesday (England)	8–1	Spora Luxembourg
Waddle 9'; Anderson 23', 90'; Warhurst 31', 77'; Bart-Williams 60', 81'; Worthington 65'	Report	da Cruz 11'

Hillsborough, Sheffield
Attendance: 19,792

1 October 1992

Spora Luxembourg	1–2	(England) Sheffield Wednesday
da Cruz 30'	Report	Watson 27'; Warhurst 35'

Stade Josy Barthel, Luxembourg
Attendance: 2,379

Sheffield Wednesday won 10–2 on aggregate.

Second Round

20 October 1992

Kaiserslautern (Germany)	3–1	(England) Sheffield Wednesday
Funkel 7' (pen.); Marin 51'; Witeczek 52'	Report	Hirst 5'; Hirst (red card) 42'

Fritz-Walter-Stadion, Kaiserslautern
Attendance: 20,802

4 November 1992

Sheffield Wednesday (England)	2–2	(Germany) Kaiserslautern
Wilson 27'; Sheridan 65'	Report	Witeczek 63'; Zeyer 76'

Hillsborough, Sheffield
Attendance: 27,597

Kaiserslautern won 5–3 on aggregate.

=== 1995–96 Intertoto Cup ===
Wednesday were invited to compete in the inaugural Intertoto Cup in 1995, and placed in Group 1. The Owls' first match against FC Basel took place while most of the players were still on holiday, so guest players had to pull on the blue and white shirt - one was John Pearson, who had last appeared for the club 10 years earlier. Wednesday finished second in the five team group, which was not enough to take them into the next round of the competition.

Group 1

Pos	Team	Pld	W	D	L	GF	GA	GD	Pts	Qualification	KAR	SHW	BAS	AAR	GÓR
1	(Germany) Karlsruhe	4	3	1	0	13	4	+9	10	Advanced to round of 16	—	1–1	—	3–0	—
2	(England) Sheffield Wednesday	4	2	1	1	7	5	+2	7		—	—	—	3–1	3–2
3	(Switzerland) Basel	4	2	0	2	6	6	0	6		2–3	1–0	—	—	—
4	(Denmark) Aarhus GF	4	2	0	2	7	8	−1	6		—	—	2–1	—	4–1
5	(Poland) Górnik Zabrze	4	0	0	4	5	15	−10	0		1–6	—	1–2	—	—

Source: rsssf.com
24 June 1995
20:00

Basel (Switzerland)	1–0	(England) Sheffield Wednesday
Rey 68'	Report

St. Jakob-Park, Basel
Attendance: 5,200
Referee: Manuel Schüttengruber (Austria)

8 July 1995
15:00

Sheffield Wednesday (England)	3–2	(Poland) Górnik Zabrze
Krzętowski 13' (o.g.); Bright 44'; Waddle 53'	Report	Szemoński 30'; Woods 72' (o.g.)

Millmoor, Rotherham
Attendance: 5,592
Referee: Alan Snoddy (Northern Ireland)

15 July 1995
16:00

Karlsruhe (Germany)	1–1	(England) Sheffield Wednesday
Bilić 5'	Report	Bright 81'

Wildparkstadion, Karlsruhe
Attendance: 13,000
Referee: Pierluigi Collina (Italy)

22 July 1995
15:00

Sheffield Wednesday (England)	3–1	(Denmark) Aarhus GF
Bright 11', 49'; Petrescu	Report	Jokovic 23'

Millmoor, Rotherham
Attendance: 6,990
Referee: Jan Wegereef (Netherlands)

Both home matches were played at Rotherham United's Millmoor as Hillsborough was unavailable.

== Summary ==
=== Record by competition ===
Competition	Pld	W	D	L	GF	GA	GD	Best performance
Inter-Cities Fairs Cup	10	5	0	5	25	18	+7	Quarter-final (1961–62)
UEFA Cup	4	2	1	1	13	7	+6	Second round (1992–93)
Intertoto Cup	4	2	1	1	7	5	+2	Group stage (1995)
Total	18	9	2	7	45	30	+15	

=== Record by nation ===
Nation	Pld	W	D	L	GF	GA	GD	Opponents
Denmark	1	1	0	0	3	1	+2	AGF
France	2	1	0	1	7	6	+1	Lyon
Germany	5	0	2	3	7	11	-4	Cologne, Kaiserslautern, Karlsruhe
Italy	2	1	0	1	4	1	+3	Roma
Luxembourg	2	2	0	0	10	2	+8	Spora Luxembourg
Netherlands	2	2	0	0	8	2	+6	DOS Utrecht
Poland	1	1	0	0	3	2	+1	Górnik Zabrze
Spain	2	1	0	1	3	4	-1	Barcelona
Switzerland	1	0	0	1	0	1	-1	Basel

=== Record by match ===
Season	Competition	Round	Opposition	Home	Away	Aggregate
1961–62	Inter-Cities Fairs Cup	First round	Lyon	5–2	2–4	7–6
1961–62	Inter-Cities Fairs Cup	Second round	Roma	4–0	0–1	4–1
1961–62	Inter-Cities Fairs Cup	Quarter-final	Barcelona	3–2	0–2	3–4
1963–64	Inter-Cities Fairs Cup	First round	DOS Utrecht	4–1	4–1	8–2
1963–64	Inter-Cities Fairs Cup	Second round	Cologne	1–2	2–3	3–5
1992–93	UEFA Cup	First round	Spora Luxembourg	8–1	2–1	10–2
1992–93	UEFA Cup	Second round	Kaiserslautern	2–2	1–3	3–5
1995	UEFA Intertoto Cup	Group 1	Basel	—N/a	0–1	2nd
1995	UEFA Intertoto Cup	Group 1	Górnik Zabrze	3–2	—N/a	2nd
1995	UEFA Intertoto Cup	Group 1	Karlsruhe	—N/a	1–1	2nd
1995	UEFA Intertoto Cup	Group 1	AGF	3–1	—N/a	2nd
