= Neil Dewar =

Scottish footballer

Personal information
- Full name: Neil Hamilton Dewar
- Date of birth: 11 November 1908
- Place of birth: Lochgilphead, Argyll, Scotland
- Date of death: 10 January 1982 (aged 73)
- Place of death: Lochgilphead, Argyll, Scotland
- Height: 5 ft 11 in (1.80 m)
- Position: Forward

Senior career*
Years	Team	Apps	(Gls)
- Lochgilphead United
1929–1933	Third Lanark	117	(120)
1933	Manchester United	36	(14)
1933–1937	Sheffield Wednesday	84	(43)
1937–1940	Third Lanark	70	(43)
Total		307	(220)

International career
1932	Scotland	3	(4)
1932–1939	Scottish Football League XI	2	(2)
1940	Scotland (wartime)	1	(1)
- * Club domestic league appearances and goals

Neil Hamilton Dewar (11 November 1908 – 10 January 1982) was a Scottish footballer who played for Third Lanark, Manchester United, Sheffield Wednesday and the Scotland national team. He usually played as a forward and had a prolific goalscoring record.

== Early life ==
Born in Lochgilphead, Argyllshire, Dewar began his working life as a trawler fisherman. He played for the local amateur team, Lochgilphead United, before starting his professional football career at Third Lanark in 1929.

== Playing career ==
=== Third Lanark ===
Dewar signed for Third Lanark after a successful trial in October 1929, shortly before his 21st birthday. In his debut season he scored 40 goals for the club and followed by helping the club to win the Second Division title in 1930–31. Third Lanark made a significant impact in the First Division the following season, finishing in fourth place. Dewar again showed impressive form, scoring 35 goals in 37 games for Thirds, and was rewarded with three Scotland caps. His international debut was a 3–0 defeat to England on 9 April 1932, in which he faced future team-mates Alfred Strange and Ernie Blenkinsop. In his second appearance for Scotland, the 3–1 win over France in an International Challenge Match the following month, Dewar scored a hat-trick. He was also on the score-sheet in what transpired to be his final Scotland appearance, a 5–2 defeat to Wales on 26 October 1932.

=== Manchester United ===
Dewar's international matches had attracted the attention of a number of clubs south of the border, and he was trailed by leading First Division clubs Arsenal, Portsmouth and Newcastle United. It was however Second Division Manchester United who won the chase for his signature, paying a hefty £4,000 for the player in February 1933.

Dewar made his debut for the club in a 3–3 draw away at Preston North End on 11 February 1933 and the Scotsman got his name on the score-sheet. Despite going on to score 14 goals in 36 games for the Red Devils, he was unable to adapt to the club's playing formation and left Old Trafford later the same year.

=== Sheffield Wednesday ===
Dewar signed for First Division Sheffield Wednesday on 29 December 1933 in an exchange deal that saw George Nevin and Jack Ball move in the other direction across the Pennines. The deal was valued at £3,000 and was criticised by some Wednesday fans as Ball was a prolific goalscorer for the Owls.

Dewar's actions off the field overshadowed his performance on the field during his early spell at the club; he had eloped with the daughter of Manchester United director councillor A. E. Thompson. The couple eventually married in a registry office but the scandal surrounding the affair led to the resignation of Thompson from the United board. A few months later, during Dewar's first season in Sheffield, the couple had a child, Neil junior, who also went on to become a footballer, playing for Altrincham. In 1945, the couple had a second son, Ross, who went on to serve with the 2nd Battalion, The Parachute Regiment for 37 years.

On the pitch, Dewar proved to be a good purchase for Wednesday manager Billy Walker, with the striker going straight in to the team and scoring on a regular basis. Despite only joining the club halfway through the season, he finished his first term at the club as joint top goal scorer (with Harry Burgess and Mark Hooper) on 13 goals.

Halfway through the 1934–35 season, Dewar lost his place in the side to Jack Palethorpe and as a result missed all of Wednesday's matches in the FA Cup, including the 1935 FA Cup Final victory over West Bromwich Albion. The season was highly successful for the Owls, with the club finishing third in Division One.

He regained his place in the first team the following season and scored the only goal in the victory over Arsenal in the Charity Shield. Dewar played in the majority of Sheffield Wednesday's matches over the rest of the season and finished as the club's top scorer with 21 goals.

Despite playing in less than half of the club's matches in the 1936–37 season, Dewar managed to repeat the feat, scoring 10 goals in a poor season for Wednesday. He made a total of 95 appearances for the Owls, scoring an impressive 50 goals, however the club were in decline and after the end of the 1936–37 season, with Wednesday relegated to the Second Division, he decided to return to his native Scotland after never really settling in England.

=== Return to Scotland ===
On 19 July 1937, Dewar re-signed for Third Lanark in a club-record breaking £1,800 deal. He went on to play a further two years of league football at Cathkin Park before retiring from playing football in 1940. He then moved back to his home village of Lochgilphead to work in the countryside, but despite officially hanging up his boots, he continued to play football at amateur level, playing for a veteran side named Old Crocks as late as 1947. He died on 10 January 1982.

== See also ==
- List of Scotland national football team hat-tricks
