= Dennis Woodhead =

English footballer

Personal information
- Date of birth: 12 June 1925
- Place of birth: Hillsborough, Sheffield, England
- Date of death: 26 July 1995 (aged 70)
- Place of death: Sheffield, England
- Position: Left winger

Youth career
- 1939–1941: Edgar Allen Tools
- 19??–1941: Hillsborough Boys Club
- 1942–1943: Sheffield Wednesday

Senior career*
Years	Team	Apps	(Gls)
1947–1955	Sheffield Wednesday	213	(73)
1955–1956	Chesterfield	15	(6)
1956–1959	Derby County	94	(24)
1959	Southport	4	(1)
- Frickley Colliery (player-manager)
- Retford Town (player-manager)
- Worksop Town
Total		326	(104)
- * Club domestic league appearances and goals

Dennis Woodhead (12 June 1925 – 26 July 1995) was a professional footballer whose career lasted from 1947 until 1959 during which time he played for Sheffield Wednesday, Chesterfield, Derby County and Southport. Woodhead was primarily a left winger who also played as a stand-in centre forward when needed. Throughout his career he made 343 appearances including FA Cup matches and scored 108 goals.

== Early life ==
Woodhead, a grandson of former Wednesday player Billy Betts, was born on 12 June 1925 in the Hillsborough area of Sheffield. As a schoolboy he represented Sheffield Boys at both football and cricket. Upon leaving school he played football for his works team Edgar Allen's for whom he worked as a fitter. At the same time he also played for Hillsborough Boys Club, a nursery side for Sheffield Wednesday. In 1941 the 16-year-old Woodhead was invited to train with Sheffield Wednesday, however his initial connection with the club was brief, playing just one wartime match, before joining the RAF as a bomber flight engineer. Woodhead completed 31 bombing missions during World War II and was finally de-mobbed from the RAF in early 1947.

== Professional career ==
=== Sheffield Wednesday ===
Woodhead had signed full professional terms with Sheffield Wednesday in April 1945 whilst still on active war service and he made his debut for the club on 24 May 1947 shortly after leaving the RAF. He played the last three games of that 1946–47 season as Wednesday managed to avoid relegation from Division Two. The following two seasons saw Woodhead miss only eight league matches as he made the left wing position his own. However, on the first day of the 1949–50 season (20 August) he broke his right leg in a 3–1 victory over Leicester City and did not return to the first team until the Christmas Eve home match against Bradford City where he scored a late equaliser. The fine form of Walter Rickett kept Woodhead out of the side for much of the remainder of the season although he did return for the vital last few matches of the campaign as Wednesday gained promotion to the First Division.

Woodhead returned as a regular to the team in the following season in Division One, scoring 14 goals and ending as joint top scorer with Hugh McJarrow and Redfern Froggatt. Woodhead played the last nine games of the campaign as a stand-in centre forward, scoring nine goals as Wednesday struggled in attack and were eventually relegated. The start of following season saw Woodhead again playing at centre forward, scoring seven goals in the opening nine games before picking up a bad injury. This allowed Derek Dooley to force his way into the side, scoring an amazing 46 goals in 30 appearances as Wednesday lifted the Second Division championship.

Woodhead remained first choice left winger for the following two seasons in Division One, doing especially well in 1953-54 when he top scored with 21 goals including three in the FA Cup as Wednesday reached the semi-final where they lost to Preston North End at Maine Road. The 1954-55 campaign saw Woodhead lose his regular spot in the team as Wednesday had a disastrous season, being relegated by nine points. He was in and out of the team as Alan Finney and Jackie Marriott played in the wing positions and limited Woodhead to just ten appearances in his final season at Hillsborough. Following relegation Wednesday manager Eric Taylor decided to rebuild the team and brought in 20-year-old Albert Broadbent from Notts County as a replacement for the 30-year-old Woodhead.

=== Latter career ===
Woodhead was signed by Chesterfield manager Teddy Davison for a fee of £2,000 on 9 September 1955 and made a thrilling debut scoring three goals in a 7–2 home win over Rochdale. He was selected to play for the Third Division North team against the South in 1955/56. However his stay at Saltergate lasted only four months, making 16 appearances in total before joining Derby County in January 1956 for a fee of £1,500. Woodhead had three good seasons with Derby, helping them to promotion from Division Three North in 1956-57 when he scored 14 goals. In February 1959 he was sold to Southport for £750 but the move only lasted four games after it was found that Woodhead had an ongoing knee injury and he was instructed to return to Derby by The Football League after a month. Woodhead retired from full-time League football in May 1959.

== After playing ==
After finishing as a professional, Woodhead played non-league football for Frickley Colliery, Retford Town and Worksop Town, also acting as player-manager for Frickley and Retford. At the same time he ran a sweet shop for a time before selling insurance. In 1967, he became lottery manager at Chesterfield F.C. then returning to Sheffield Wednesday in 1971 as Commercial Development Officer, replacing Derek Dooley who had moved up to be first team manager. Dennis Woodhead remained in his job with Sheffield Wednesday until 1987 when he took early retirement, he died on 26 July 1995, aged 70.
