= Garrick F.C. =

Garrick
- Full name: Garrick Football Club
- Founded: 1866
- Dissolved: 1878?
- Ground: East Bank
- Secretary: William Riley, Jr
Home colours

Garrick Football Club was an English association football club based in Sheffield, Yorkshire.

== History ==
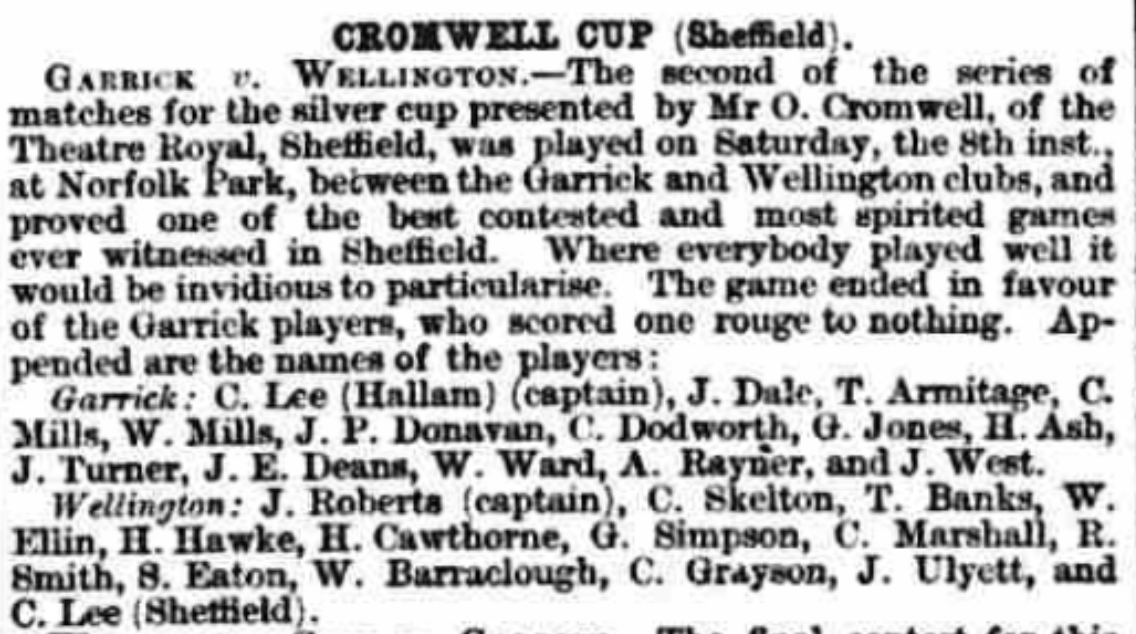
1867–68 Cromwell Cup Semi-Final, Wellington v Garrick, Sportsman, 18 February 1868

Garrick was formed in October 1866, holding its first practice match at East Bank on the 27th. The club took its name from the Garrick Hotel where the club held its meetings. The earliest recorded game for the club was a 1 rouge to 0 win over Wellington club the next month, in a 12-a-side match at East Bank.

Along with Wellington, it was the first to participate in the first two open footballing competitions. In the first, the Youdan Cup of 1867, Garrick lost by one goal and one rouge to nothing against the Mackenzie club at the Orphanage ground on London Road.

The following year it entered the Cromwell Cup and after beating Wellington (apparently borrowing seven players from Heeley to ensure victory), it met the newly formed Wednesday in the final at Bramall Lane. In front of around 500 spectators the two clubs fought out a goalless draw. It was agreed to play extra time with the first team to score being the victor (thus becoming the first use of the Golden Goal), but Garrick lost when Wednesday scored a goal after 10 minutes.

Garrick then withdrew from playing the more popular local teams, instead taking on the minor teams and playing the occasional out-of-town match (including one of Sheffield's first rugby matches against Manchester Free Wanderers).

The club was reasonably active until 1877 but the last record of activity in the regular game is a failure to turn up to a friendly with Staveley F.C. in December that year; a one-off match in 1886 against the local pantomime actors seems to have been a scratch team using the name as a pun, as the contemporary Garrick Cricket Club was also made up of actors.

== Colours ==
The club's colours were red, white, and blue; the style of multicoloured jerseys at the time was to arrange colours in hoops.

== Ground ==
The club originally played home matches at East Bank, in the south-east of Sheffield, 2 miles from Sheffield Victoria railway station. By 1871 it had moved to Sharrow Vale at Endcliffe, one mile from the station.
