= Henry Topping (footballer, born 1908) =

English footballer

Personal information
- Date of birth: 27 October 1908
- Place of birth: Manchester, England
- Date of death: January 1977 (aged 68)
- Position: Full back

Youth career
- United Glassblowers

Senior career*
Years	Team	Apps	(Gls)
- Horwich RMI
1932–1935	Manchester United	12	(1)
1935–1936	Barnsley	14	(2)
1936–1937	Macclesfield	21	(11)
- Manchester North End
- Wigan Athletic
- * Club domestic league appearances and goals

Henry Topping (27 October 1908 – January 1977) was an English footballer who played as a full-back. Born in Manchester, he started his career at United Glassblowers and later played for Horwich Railway Mechanics Institute, Manchester United, Barnsley, Macclesfield and Wigan Athletic.
