= Herbert Heywood (footballer) =

English footballer

Personal information
- Position: Forward

Senior career*
Years	Team	Apps	(Gls)
1932–1934	Manchester United	4	(2)
1934–1935	Tranmere Rovers	9	(1)
- * Club domestic league appearances and goals

Herbert Heywood (1913 - unknown) was an English footballer. His regular position was as a forward. He was born in Bolton. He played for Tranmere Rovers and Manchester United.
