= Eddie Green (footballer) =

English footballer

Robert Edward Green (January 1912 – 1949) was an English footballer. His regular position was as a forward. He was born in Tewkesbury, Gloucestershire. He started his playing career at Gloucestershire amateur team Tewkesbury Town before playing for Bournemouth & Boscombe Athletic, Derby County, Manchester United, Stockport County and Cheltenham Town.
