= Mick Prendergast =

English footballer

Personal information
- Full name: Michael John Prendergast
- Date of birth: 24 November 1950
- Place of birth: Denaby Main, England
- Date of death: 29 April 2010 (aged 59)
- Place of death: Mexborough, England
- Height: 5 ft 7 in (1.70 m)
- Position: Striker

Youth career
- 1962–1966: Don & Dearne Boys
- Yorkshire Boys
- 1966–1967: Sheffield Wednesday

Senior career*
Years	Team	Apps	(Gls)
1966–1978	Sheffield Wednesday	183	(53)
1978–1979	Barnsley	20	(2)
1978	→ Halifax Town (loan)	4	(1)
- Mexborough Town Athletic
- Denaby United
Total		207	(56)
- * Club domestic league appearances and goals

Mick Prendergast (24 November 1950 – 29 April 2010) was an English professional footballer whose career lasted from 1969 to 1979 during which time he made a total of 232 appearances in all competitions, scoring 62 goals. He was a forward player who played for Sheffield Wednesday and Barnsley. Prendergast was a popular player in his time at Hillsborough and went by the nickname of "Prendo". Prendergast was born in the South Yorkshire village of Denaby Main on 24 November 1950.

== Playing career ==
As a youth footballer he played for Yorkshire Boys and Don and Dearne Boys before joining Sheffield Wednesday as a 15-year-old apprentice in October 1966.

=== Sheffield Wednesday ===
Prendergast started in the Youth team at Wednesday and graduated through the ranks, making his reserve team debut in the Central League in September 1967. Prendergast was top scorer for the reserves in 1968–69 and he made his first team debut towards the end of that season, scoring in a 3–2 defeat at Newcastle United on 9 April 1969. The following season saw Wednesday relegated to Division Two with Prendergast making just 12 league appearances. The 1970–71 season saw Prendergast become a regular in the first team, finishing as top scorer by a comfortable margin with 16 goals.

The rest of his Sheffield Wednesday career saw Prendergast beset by injuries, in 1972–73 he only made 19 appearances after suffering cartilage trouble and internal bleeding in his knee. He returned the following season to forge a good striking partnership with Brian Joicey which realised 23 goals, with Prendergast contributing 11 and being voted Player of the Year. However, misfortune struck towards the end of that season when he suffered a broken leg in a goalless draw at Preston on 12 April 1974.

Prendergast returned to first team action in February 1975 to play five games in a struggling Wednesday side that suffered relegation to Division Three for the first time in their history. He scored the club's first ever goal in Division Three in a 1–2 away defeat at Southend in August 1975 and went on to have a good season as he netted 13 goals in 39 appearances to be top scorer for the second time. In the 1976–77 campaign he was limited to five full appearances as injury and the good form of Rodger Wylde and Tommy Tynan kept him out of the team. In April 1977, after ten years service with the club, he was granted a testimonial match against Leicester City with 3,179 fans turning up to see Leicester win 3–2 with Ron Springett and Peter Swan coming out of retirement to play for Mick. Prendergast was placed on the transfer list in January 1978 as Jack Charlton, who had taken over as Wednesday manager, began a clear out of staff. In March 1978 just before the transfer window closed he signed for Barnsley for a fee of £14,000. Prendergast was recently voted as the favourite player of fans who remembered the Sheffield Wednesday teams of the mid-1970s in John Dyson's book: "Our Lowest Ebb: A New History of Sheffield Wednesday's Darkest Times - 1973-76".

=== Barnsley ===
Prendergast stayed at Barnsley for 14 months, but he only made 12 full league appearances in that time, making a single appearance in the 1978–79 season as Barnsley gained promotion from Division Four. He went on a months loan to Halifax Town in October/November 1978 making four league appearances and one in the FA Cup. He scored his last goal for a league club while with Halifax, netting in a 1–2 defeat at Grimsby Town on 18 November 1978.

=== Latter career and retirement ===
With his professional career over at the age of 29, Prendergast had brief spells in Non-League football at Mexborough Town Athletic and Denaby United. He was given a second testimonial match while at Denaby against Sheffield Wednesday before being advised to retire completely from playing on medical grounds in the early 1980s. He was forced to have a hip replacement at the age of 36.

=== Death ===
Aged 59 years old, on 29 April 2010 Prendergast died at Mexborough Montagu Hospital due to complications of alcoholism.
