= Percy Newton =

English footballer

Percy Newton (January 1904 – October 1993) was an English footballer. His regular position was at full back. He was born in Whitchurch, Shropshire. He played for Manchester United, Sandbach Ramblers and Tranmere Rovers.
