= Frank Froggatt =

English footballer

Personal information
- Full name: Frank Froggatt
- Date of birth: 21 March 1898
- Place of birth: Sheffield, England
- Date of death: March 1944 (aged 45)
- Place of death: Sheffield, England
- Position: Half-back

Senior career*
Years	Team	Apps	(Gls)
1914–1915	Rose Athletic		
1919–1920	Attercliffe		
1920–1921	Denaby United		
1921–1922	Worksop Town		
1921–1927	The Wednesday	90	(1)
1927–1931	Notts County	115	(1)
1931–1934	Chesterfield	28	(0)
1934–1935	Scarborough		
1935	Manchester North End		
Total		233	(2)
- * Club domestic league appearances and goals

Frank Froggatt (21 March 1898 – March 1944) was an English footballer who played in the Football League for Chesterfield, Notts County and The Wednesday. His son, Redfern, and cousin, Jack were also professional footballers.
