= Brian Joicey =

English footballer (born 1945)

Personal information
- Date of birth: 19 December 1945 (age 80)
- Place of birth: Winlaton, England
- Height: 5 ft 11 1/2 in (1.82 m)
- Position: Forward

Youth career
- Ashington
- Blyth Spartans
- Tow Law Town
- North Shields

Senior career*
Years	Team	Apps	(Gls)
1969–1971	Coventry City	39	(9)
1971–1976	Sheffield Wednesday	145	(48)
1976–1978	Barnsley	93	(43)
1978–?	Bakewell Town		
- Frickley Athletic
- Matlock Town
Total		277	(100)
- * Club domestic league appearances and goals

Brian Joicey (born 19 December 1945) is a retired professional footballer who played as a forward for Coventry City, Sheffield Wednesday and Barnsley in a career that lasted from 1969 to 1979. Joicey did not play league football until he was 23 years old. In professional football he made 277 appearances and scored 100 goals. Following his football league career he returned to high level non-league football.

== Career ==
=== Amateur in the 1960s ===
Brian Joicey was born in the Winlaton area of Blaydon, Tyne and Wear on 19 December 1945. He played as a youth for Clara Vale On leaving school he played for the Northern League clubs Ashington, Blyth Spartans and Tow Law Town. He started to make a name for himself as a footballer when playing as an amateur for North Shields in the late 1960s. He was a member of the North Shields team that won the Northern League and the FA Amateur Cup in the 1968–69 season, Joicey scored one of the goals which beat Sutton United 2–1 at Wembley Stadium to win the Amateur Cup that season and made a major contribution, scoring 44 goals as the team finished top of the Northern League.

=== Coventry City ===
Joicey's success with North Shields alerted some professional league clubs and he surprisingly signed for First Division Coventry City in preference to Newcastle United for the start of the 1969–70 season, he made 39 league appearances and scored nine goals in his two full seasons with Coventry as they finished sixth in Division One in his first season with the club and qualified for the Inter-Cities Fairs Cup. Joicey scored a goal in the Fairs Cup victory over Trakia Plovdiv at Highfield Road in October 1970. During his time with Coventry Joicey was never an automatic selection for the first team and played a large amount of reserve team football as Neil Martin was preferred as first choice centre forward.

=== Sheffield Wednesday ===
Joicey started the 1971–72 season with Coventry but before the end of August he had joined Second Division Sheffield Wednesday. Wednesday manager Derek Dooley was interested in signing City's Dave Clements and watched him in a game, he was impressed with Joicey's performance in the same game and it resulted in both players joining Wednesday on 27 August for a combined fee of £100,000. Joicey made his first team debut for Wednesday four days later in an away match at Middlesbrough and scored his first goal on 4 September against Portsmouth. Joicey finished leading scorer for Wednesday in each of his first three seasons with the club, one of the highlights of his stay at Hillsborough was a hat-trick in a 3–2 FA Cup 4th round replay victory over First Division Crystal Palace at Villa Park on 19 February 1973.

Brian's fourth season with Wednesday was not a success, he was plagued by injury and poor form as the team were relegated to the Third Division, he scored two goals in 23 appearances as the club tried numerous permutations in the forward line. Another unsuccessful season (1975–76) led to Joicey being signed by Fourth Division Barnsley on a free transfer in July 1976.

=== Barnsley ===
Joicey's time with Barnsley was quite successful, scoring 43 goals in 93 league appearances. He was ever present in his first season (1976–77) and ended that campaign as Division Four's top scorer with 26 league goals, he also scored an FA Cup hat-trick against Boston United that year. His career was cut short by injury in November 1978 when he collapsed on the field in Barnsley's away match with York City. He was taken to hospital where initial tests indicated kidney damage. It was announced a few days later that the first diagnosis was wrong and he had suffered a (minor) stroke. Brian was forced to retire from professional football although he did make some appearances later in non-league football, most notably for Frickley Athletic and Matlock Town. Barnsley organised a testimonial match against a combined Sheffield Wednesday and Sheffield United side to mark the end of his career with Mick Channon and David Speedie taking part amongst other stars. It was also revealed during the Championship live on BBC Two between Nottingham Forest and Cardiff City on 5 April 2010 that Wolverhampton Wanderers manager Mick McCarthy used to clean Joicey's boots during their time at Barnsley together, a humorous revelation that made BBC commentator Guy Mowbray laugh and vaguely reminisce, after Mowbray commented that Cardiff City captain Jay Bothroyd used to clean Chelsea defender Ashley Cole's boots during Bothroyd's time as a trainee at Arsenal.

== Retirement ==
After retiring Brian opened "Brian Joicey Motors" a second hand car dealership on Middlewood Road, just half a mile from the Sheffield Wednesday ground and now works as a car salesman for a Honda franchise in the south of Sheffield. Brian retired on 24 December 2010 and enjoys life with his wife Sue in Dronfield Derbyshire.
