= Johnny McIntyre (footballer, born 1895) =

Scottish footballer

Personal information
- Full name: John McGregor McIntyre
- Date of birth: 4 January 1895
- Place of birth: Whiteinch, Scotland
- Date of death: February 1974 (aged 79)
- Place of death: Blackpool, England
- Height: 5 ft 8 1/2 in (1.74 m)
- Positions: Inside forward; left half

Senior career*
Years	Team	Apps	(Gls)
–1912	Denny Athletic		
1912–1919	Partick Thistle	41	(4)
1915	→ Vale of Leven (loan)		
1915–1916	→ St Mirren (loan)	2	(0)
1919–1921	Fulham	26	(9)
1921–1922	The Wednesday	67	(36)
1922–1927	Blackburn Rovers	175	(38)
1927–1928	Blackpool	6	(2)
- Chorley
- Derby Co-op Welfare
Total		274	(85)
- * Club domestic league appearances and goals

John McGregor McIntyre (4 January 1895 – February 1974) was a Scottish professional footballer who played in the Football League for Fulham, The Wednesday, Blackburn Rovers and Blackpool as an inside forward. He also played in the Scottish League for Partick Thistle and St Mirren.

== Personal life ==
McIntyre served in the Royal Air Force during the First World War.

== Career statistics ==
Appearances and goals by club, season and competition
Club	Season	League			National cup (Note: Includes Scottish Cup, FA Cup)		Other		Total	
Club	Season	Division	Apps	Goals	Apps	Goals	Apps	Goals	Apps	Goals
Partick Thistle	1912–13	Scottish First Division	10	1	0	0	―		10	1
Partick Thistle	1913–14	Scottish First Division	15	1	0	0	1 (Note: Appearance in Scottish Qualifying Cup)	0	16	1
Partick Thistle	1914–15	Scottish First Division	10	2	―		―		10	2
Partick Thistle	1916–17	Scottish First Division	4	0	―		―		4	0
Partick Thistle	1918–19	Scottish First Division	2	0	―		―		2	0
Partick Thistle	Total		41	4	0	0	1	0	42	4
St Mirren (loan)	1915–16	Scottish First Division	2	0	―		―		2	0
The Wednesday	1919–20	First Division	9	1	―		―		9	1
The Wednesday	1920–21	Second Division	41	27	3	0	―		44	27
The Wednesday	1921–22	Second Division	17	8	0	0	―		17	8
The Wednesday	Total		67	36	3	0	―		70	36
Career total			110	40	3	0	1	0	114	40
