= Andrew Wilson (footballer, born 1879) =

Scottish footballer (1879–1945)

Personal information
- Date of birth: 10 December 1879
- Place of birth: Colmonell, Scotland
- Date of death: 13 March 1945 (aged 65)
- Place of death: Kilwinning, Scotland
- Position: Centre forward

Senior career*
Years	Team	Apps	(Gls)
1897–1899	Irvine Meadow		
1899–1900	Clyde	18	(7)
1900–1920	Sheffield Wednesday	501	(199)
Total		519	(206)

International career
1907–1914	Scotland	6	(2)

Managerial career
- 1921–1926: Bristol Rovers
- 1927–1932: Oldham Athletic
- 1932–1933: Stockport County
- * Club domestic league appearances and goals

Andrew Wilson (10 December 1879 – 13 March 1945) was a Scottish footballer who played the majority of his career at Sheffield Wednesday, and was also called up to the Scotland national team. At Wednesday he won the Football League in 1903 and 1904, and the FA Cup in 1907. He holds the club's all-time records for appearances made and goals scored.

== Club career ==
Born into a farming family in Colmonell and raised in Dundonald, South Ayrshire, Wilson started his football career at local junior club Irvine Meadow before moving onto Clyde in Glasgow.

Wilson moved to newly promoted The Wednesday in 1900 where he spent the rest of his playing days. During his time in Sheffield, he won the Football League in 1902–03 and 1903–04, and the FA Cup in 1907. He became the club's all-time record top scorer with 216 goals including 199 in the league (all in the top division). He was top scorer in six different seasons. He appeared for the team 546 times, more than any other player. Both records stand to the present day.

With his career seemingly having come to an enforced end as a result of the onset of World War I, he made one final league appearance before retiring on 10 March 1920, aged 39 years and 91 days, becoming the oldest player to play for the Owls; this record stood until it was beaten by player-manager Trevor Francis in 1993.

== International career ==
Wilson was capped for Scotland six times between April 1907 and March 1914. He scored two goals, both against England, in the 1907–08 and 1911–12 editions of the British Home Championship (in each case the venue was Hampden Park, he opened the scoring, the match ended as a 1–1 draw, and the title was shared between the teams).

== Managerial career ==
Wilson began a managerial career after his playing retirement, initially with Bristol Rovers where he spent over five years between March 1921 and the end of the 1925-26 season. He joined Oldham Athletic in 1927 and was later manager of Stockport County for the 1932-33 season.

== Personal life ==
Three of Wilson's brothers were also professional footballers: David spent most of his career with Oldham Athletic and was selected once by Scotland in 1913 (a match in which Andrew also played – the last occasion when siblings took the field together until after the Second World War); James played with St Mirren and Preston North End and was selected for the Scottish Football League XI; and Alec played for Preston and Oldham.

== See also ==
- List of Scottish football families
- List of Sheffield Wednesday F.C. records and statistics
