= Brian Hill (footballer, born 1937) =

English footballer

Personal information
- Date of birth: 6 October 1937
- Place of birth: Sheffield, England
- Date of death: 5 April 1968 (aged 30)
- Position: Full back

Youth career
- –1956: Sheffield Wednesday

Senior career*
| Years | Team | Apps | (Gls) |
| 1956–1967 | Sheffield Wednesday | 117 | (1) |
| 1967–1968 | Club Brugge | 11 | (0) |
| Total | | 128 | (1) |
- * Club domestic league appearances and goals

Brian Hill (6 October 1937 – 5 April 1968) was an English professional footballer who played as a full back.

== Career ==
Born in Sheffield, Hill began his career at Sheffield Wednesday, where he made 117 appearances in the Football League for them between 1956 and 1967. He also made 2 FA Cup and 3 European appearances for the club. He later played in Belgium for Club Brugge, making 11 league and 2 European appearances for them.

== Death ==
Hill died of a heart attack on 5 April 1968.
