= George Nevin =

English footballer

Personal information
- Full name: George William Nevin
- Date of birth: 16 December 1907
- Place of birth: Lintz, England
- Date of death: January 1973 (aged 65)
- Place of death: Sheffield, England
- Height: 5 ft 9 in (1.75 m)
- Position: Full back

Youth career
- Dipton United
- Lintz Colliery
- Whitehead-le-Rangers

Senior career*
Years	Team	Apps	(Gls)
1928–1930	Newcastle United	6	(0)
1930–1934	Sheffield Wednesday	2	(0)
1934	Manchester United	4	(0)
1934–1935	Sheffield Wednesday	0	(0)
1935–1937	Burnley	26	(0)
1937–1939	Lincoln City	8	(0)
1939	Rochdale	0	(0)
- * Club domestic league appearances and goals

George William Nevin (16 December 1907 - January 1973) was an English footballer. His regular position was at full back. He was born in Lintz, County Durham. He played for Newcastle United, Sheffield Wednesday, Manchester United, Burnley and Lincoln City.
