= Cromwell Cup =

Sheffield Rules football competition

1868 Cromwell Cup
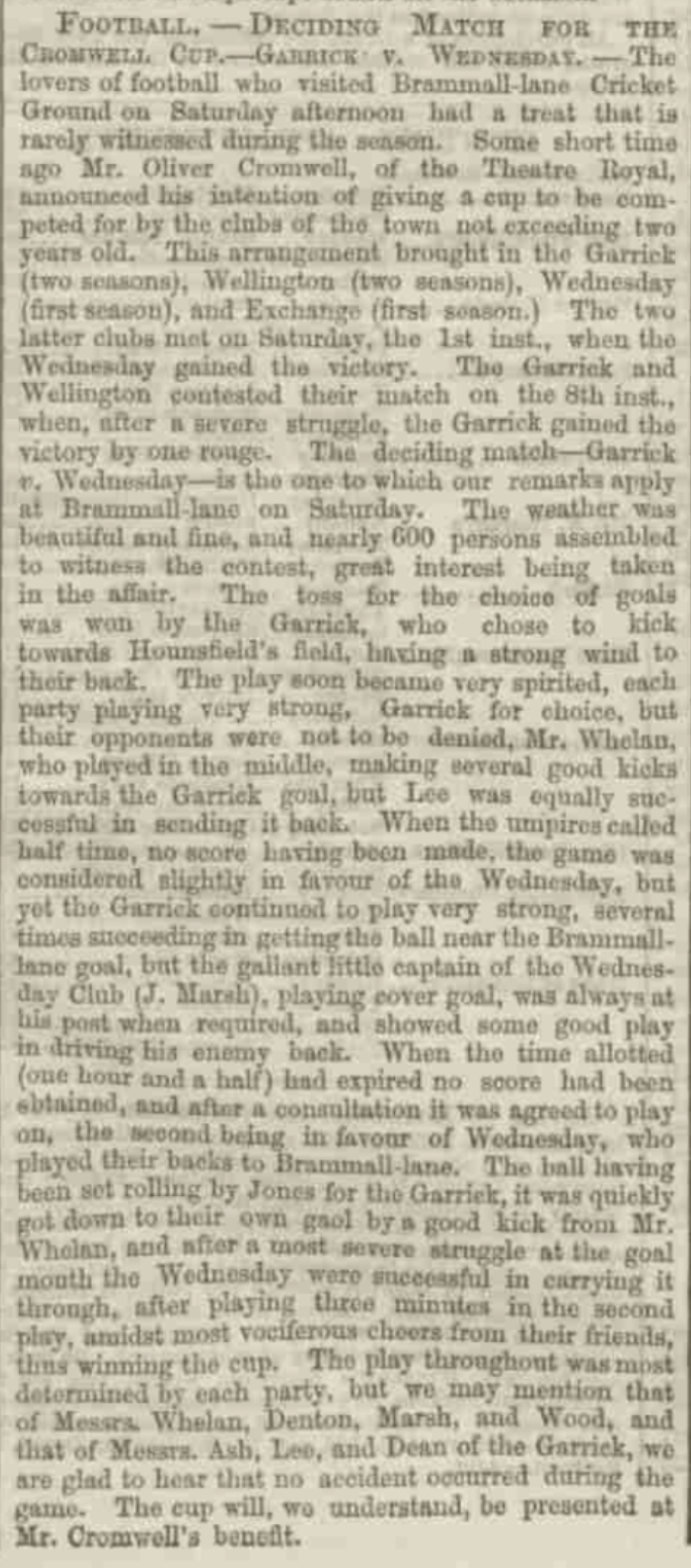
- 1868 Cromwell Cup Final, Wednesday v Garrick, Sheffield Daily Telegraph, 17 February 1868

Tournament details
- Country: England
- Venue: Sheffield
- Dates: 1 February 1868 – 15 February 1868
- Teams: 4

Final positions
- Champions: The Wednesday

Tournament statistics
- Matches played: 3
- Goals scored: 4 (1.33 per match)

The Cromwell Cup was the second ever Sheffield rules football competition (after the Youdan Cup) and was held in Sheffield, England. It was held in February 1868 and named after Oliver Cromwell, manager of the local Alexandra Theatre (not to be confused with the Lord Protector or Sir Oliver Cromwell, or Oliver Cromwell), who donated the cup. He also played for Garrick F.C.. The tournament was only open to teams under two years old. The final was held at Bramall Lane, Sheffield. The trophy is still held in the Sheffield Wednesday trophy cabinet.

Sheffield Rules at the time involved rouges as well as goals. Garrick were expected to sweep aside the newly created Wednesday team. Despite this, the final remained 0(0)–0(0) at the end of the regulation 90 minutes. Both captains then agreed to carry on playing for a result with the scorer of the first goal taking the trophy. After another 10 minutes of play, Wednesday finally broke the deadlock with a goal, thus claiming their first trophy.

== Participating teams ==
Participating clubs
| Team | Foundation | No. of members | Home ground | Colours |
|---|---|---|---|---|
| Exchange | 1863 | 120 | Hallam's Farm | Scarlet & white |
| Garrick | 1866 (October) | 400 | East Bank | Red, white, & blue |
| Wednesday | 1867 | 170 | Highfield | Blue & white hoops |
| Wellington | 1866 | 150 | Houndsfields Park | Puce & white |

== Results ==
| Date | Team 1 | Goals (Rouges) | Team 2 | Ground |
|---|---|---|---|---|
First Round
| 1 February 1868 | The Wednesday | 4 (3) – 0 (0) | Exchange | Mackenzie Ground |
| 8 February 1868 | Garrick | 0 (1) – 0 (0) | Wellington | Mackenzie Ground |
Final
| 15 February 1868 | The Wednesday | 1 (0) – 0 (0) a.s.d.e.t. | Garrick | Bramall Lane |

== See also ==
- The Youdan Cup
