= Jack Ball (footballer, born 1907) =

English footballer

Personal information
- Full name: John Thomas Ball
- Date of birth: 13 September 1907
- Place of birth: Banks, Lancashire, England
- Date of death: 1976 (aged 68–69)
- Height: 5 ft 10 in (1.78 m)
- Position: Forward

Senior career*
Years	Team	Apps	(Gls)
–1925	Newtown United		
1925–1926	Mossley		
1926–1927	Southport		
1927–1929	Chorley		
1929–1930	Manchester United	24	(11)
1930–1933	Sheffield Wednesday	132	(90)
1933–1934	Manchester United	26	(7)
1934	Huddersfield Town	5	(1)
1934–?	Luton Town		
- * Club domestic league appearances and goals

John Thomas Ball (13 September 1907 – 1976) was an English footballer, who played as a forward. Born in Banks, Lancashire, he played for clubs including Southport, Manchester United, Sheffield Wednesday, Huddersfield Town and Luton Town.

He joined Mossley from Newtown United in 1925, scoring 10 goals in 18 appearances, including a debut hat-trick in a 5–1 win over Macclesfield on 31 October 1925, before moving to Southport for the 1926–27 season. He then moved to Chorley before in 1929 moving to Manchester United.

He moved from Manchester United to Sheffield Wednesday in the summer of 1930, and made his Wednesday debut on 8 September. He played in Sheffield Wednesday's 2–1 defeat by Arsenal in the Charity Shield at Stamford Bridge in October 1930. Ball scored 94 goals in just 135 matches with the Sheffield club, before returning to Manchester United in December 1933. In September 1934, he moved to Huddersfield Town, but he moved on to Luton Town after only a month.

He had a short spell in France as a coach with Excelsior Roubaix after his playing career was finished and briefly managed St Albans City and Biggleswade Town after the Second World War.
