= Johnny Fantham =

English footballer (1939–2014)

John Fantham
Personal information
- Date of birth: 6 February 1939
- Place of birth: Sheffield, West Riding of Yorkshire, England
- Date of death: 25 June 2014 (aged 75)
- Place of death: Sheffield, England
- Position: Inside forward

Senior career*
Years	Team	Apps	(Gls)
1956–1969	Sheffield Wednesday	388	(147)
1969–1971	Rotherham United	51	(8)
1971–1972	Macclesfield Town	37	(5)
Total		476	(160)

International career
1961	England	1	(0)
- * Club domestic league appearances and goals

John Fantham (6 February 1939 – 25 June 2014) was an English footballer.

Fantham was born in Sheffield, West Riding of Yorkshire. He is Sheffield Wednesday's leading post-war goalscorer with 166 goals. He was signed in 1956 and made his Wednesday debut two years later. Fantham firmly established himself as an able goalscorer in the English top flight for Wednesday, as his 23 goals helped the club to a second-place finish in 1960–61. The following season, he netted 24 times, earning him selection for the England under-23 team and his only England cap at full international level. He was an integral part of the Wednesday side that reached the 1966 FA Cup Final and two years later, he passed Redfern Froggatt's post war scoring record. Fantham made 435 appearances for the club, staying until 1969 when he joined Rotherham United.

== Honours ==
Sheffield Wednesday

- FA Cup runner-up: 1965–66
