= Alan Finney =

English footballer (1933–2025)

Personal information
- Date of birth: 31 October 1933
- Place of birth: Langwith, Derbyshire, England
- Date of death: 30 July 2025 (aged 91)
- Height: 5 ft 8 in (1.73 m)
- Position: Winger

Youth career
- 1949–1951: Sheffield Wednesday

Senior career*
Years	Team	Apps	(Gls)
1951–1966	Sheffield Wednesday	455	(83)
1966–1967	Doncaster Rovers	30	(3)
1967–1968	Alfreton Town	37	(3)
Total		485	(86)

International career
1954–1957	England U23	3	(0)
1956	England B	1	(0)
- * Club domestic league appearances and goals

Alan Finney (31 October 1933 – 30 July 2025) was an English professional footballer who played as a winger for Sheffield Wednesday, Doncaster Rovers and Alfreton Town.

== Career ==
Finney joined Sheffield Wednesday from amateur football in 1949 and made his first team debut at the age of 17, against Chelsea, in 1951. His first League goal came in a famous clash with Everton in May that year — Wednesday won 6–0 but both clubs were relegated to the second division having inferior goal averages to Chelsea. However, Wednesday bounced straight back to the top flight as Division Two champions the following season, with Finney supplying the chances for local player Derek Dooley. Finney was a regular as the club again won the Second Division Championship in 1955–56 and 1958–59 and also featured in every game of the FA Cup runs of 1954 and 1960, which saw Wednesday stumble at the semi-final hurdle. He was ever-present during the 1960–61 campaign in which Wednesday finished runners-up.

Finney had the ability to play on both wings and although he was chiefly a provider contributed his fair share in terms of goalscoring too. His form brought recognition for England at 'B' and Under-23 levels.

Finney signed for Doncaster Rovers in January 1966 for £5,000, scoring one goal in their Division 4 championship winning season, and two in the following relegation season before moving to Alfreton Town.

== Death ==
Finney died on 30 July 2025, at the age of 91.
