= Redfern Froggatt =

English footballer

Personal information
- Date of birth: 23 August 1924
- Place of birth: Sheffield, England
- Date of death: 26 December 2003 (aged 79)
- Place of death: Sheffield, England
- Height: 5 ft 10 1/2 in (1.79 m)
- Position: Forward

Senior career*
Years	Team	Apps	(Gls)
1945–1960	Sheffield Wednesday	434	(140)

International career
1950	England B	1	(1)
1952–1953	England	4	(2)
- * Club domestic league appearances and goals

Redfern Froggatt (23 August 1924 – 26 December 2003) was an English footballer for Sheffield Wednesday and England. In total he received four England caps scoring 2 goals.

== Club career ==
In 1942 'Red' was signed from Sheffield YMCA but did not become a regular player in the Sheffield Wednesday side until 1945. Over the course of the next 15 years he would go on to make a total of 498 appearances for the club, mostly as a striker but playing over 50 games as a winger, scoring 149 goals. On New Year's Eve 1953, Froggatt submitted a transfer request, and an offer from Steel City derby rivals Sheffield United was rejected in February 1954.

His final game for Wednesday came in the 1959–60 season. On 22 January 1960, Froggatt turned down a move to fellow South Yorkshire club Doncaster Rovers, before signing for Stalybridge Celtic in 1962.

== International career ==
Froggatt received his first representative honours when he played for England B against Switzerland B at his club's ground of Hillsborough, on 18 January 1950.

Froggatt featured on the 28-man longlist for the 1950 FIFA World Cup, however was excluded from the final squad. He made his England debut in a British Home Championship match against Wales on 12 November 1952, before scoring his first England goal in the following international fixture a fortnight later, against Belgium. Froggatt faced Scotland in his third consecutive England international. His fourth and last England cap was his first away from Wembley Stadium, and came on 8 June 1953 against the United States at Yankee Stadium in New York, in which he scored one of the Three Lions' six.

== Personal life ==
Redfern was the son of former Wednesday captain and Notts County centre-half Frank Froggatt, and the cousin of England international Jack Froggatt.
