= Derek Dooley (footballer) =

English footballer, manager, and chairman

Derek Dooley MBE
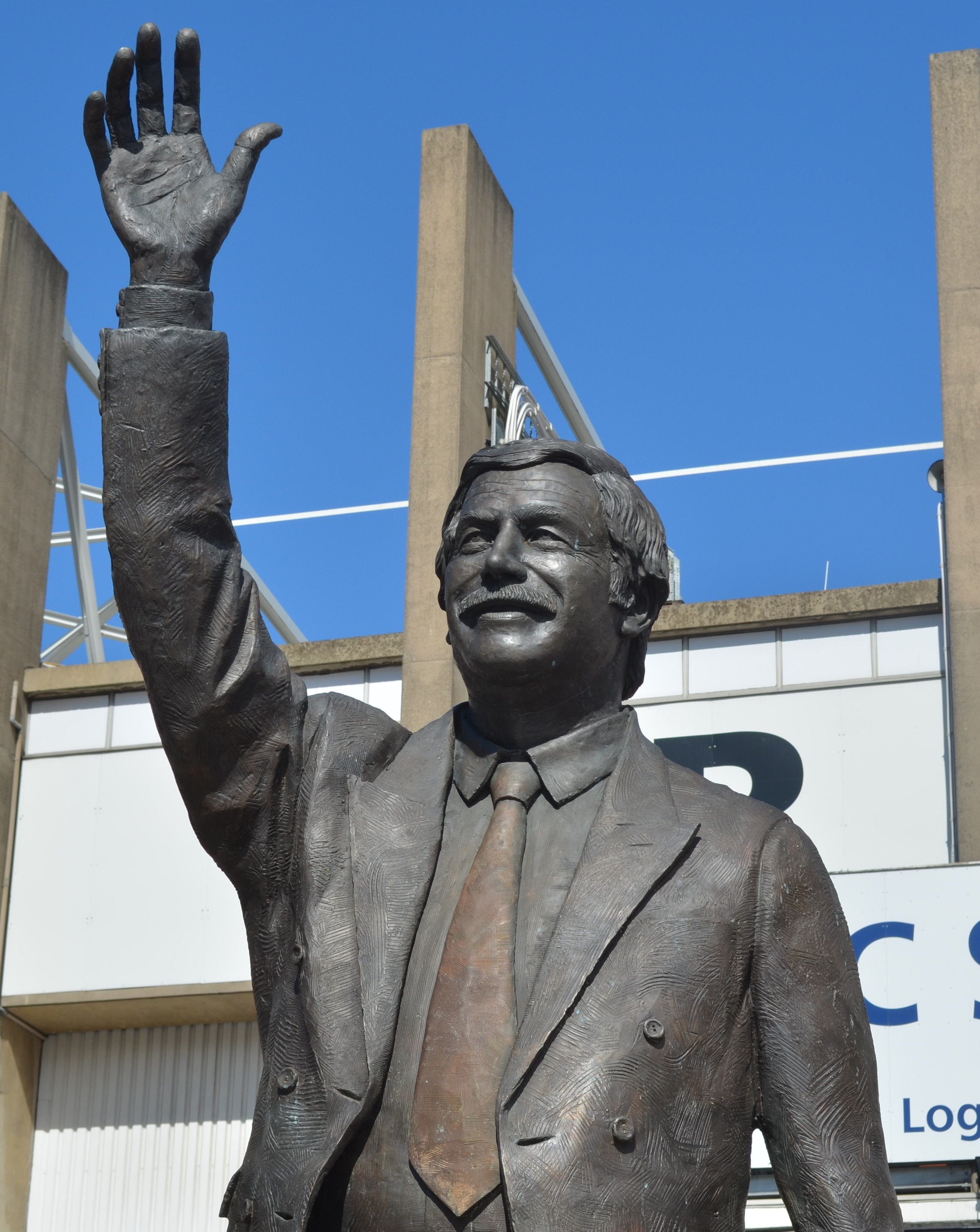
- Statue of Dooley outside Bramall Lane.

Personal information
- Date of birth: 13 December 1929
- Place of birth: Pitsmoor, Sheffield, England
- Date of death: 5 March 2008 (aged 78)
- Place of death: Sheffield, England
- Position: Striker

Senior career*
Years	Team	Apps	(Gls)
1946–1947	Lincoln City	2	(2)
1947–1953	Sheffield Wednesday	61	(62)
Total		63	(63)

Managerial career
- 1971–1973: Sheffield Wednesday
- * Club domestic league appearances and goals

Derek Dooley (13 December 1929 – 5 March 2008) was an English football player, manager and chairman. He lived in Sheffield for the majority of his life, taking roles at both Sheffield Wednesday and Sheffield United.

He started his football league career with Lincoln City in 1946, but made only two appearances for them before joining Sheffield Wednesday the following year. In his time at Hillsborough he was a prolific goalscorer for Wednesday. Between 1950 and 1953 he scored 62 goals in 61 league games for the Owls, along with one goal from his two FA Cup appearances. His career was cut short when an infected leg had to be amputated following a serious fracture in his last match for the club.

== Early life ==
Derek Dooley was born on 13 December 1929 in Pitsmoor, Sheffield. At the time Wednesday were in the process of successfully defending their Division 1 title. Both his mother and father were factory workers. Work commitments had prevented his father from having a trial with Bradford City. He went to Owler Lane School where they played football 2 hours a week. He was put in the senior team at the age of 13.

After leaving school at the age of 14 he took a job at a hearing-aid factory and played football for a Sheffield YMCA. 'Pop' Bennett, the manager of the YMCA, wanted to play him at centre-half but Dooley insisted that he would play at centre-forward or not at all. The manager relented and he was played up front where he became a prolific scorer. A year later he was given an opportunity with Lincoln City.

== Playing career ==
He was signed for Lincoln as an amateur and still played for the local YMCA. He played for the reserves side for two seasons becoming their top scorer. Towards the end of the 1946–47 season he played two matches for the first team side scoring a goal on each occasion. Lincoln decided to offer him a part-time contract but he declined as he wanted to help Sheffield and Hallamshire County Football Association to the final of Northern Counties Championship. It was at the final that he was spotted by Sheffield Wednesday scout Tommy Walker. A meeting with Eric Taylor, the Wednesday manager, was organised and as his contract with Lincoln had lapsed he was signed immediately.

In four years he scored 55 goals in 38 appearances in Wednesday's third team (playing in the Yorkshire League) side and 37 goals in 49 for their reserve side, who played in the Central League. This included 8 goals in a single match. He was given his first chance at first team football in March 1950 against Preston North End. It was the first of two games in the 1949–50 season but he failed to impress in either.

A poor 1950–51 season led to the Owls being relegated to Division 2 on goal difference. Wednesday's poor form continued the following season winning just three of the first eleven matches. Dooley earned a recall for the next match against Barnsley. He took full advantage of the chance scoring two goals to help Wednesday to a 2–1 victory. This was followed by three matches where he only added a solitary goal but at the beginning of November he found a goal scoring touch that would make him Sheffield Wednesday most prolific scorer of all time.

His goal scoring run started with him scoring 22 goals in 9 matches. He went on to score a total of 46 goals in his first season, surpassing the 25-year-old record of 37 goals that was held by Jimmy Trotter. The tally remains a club record to the present day. The season finished with the Owls being promoted back to Division 1 as champions.

After a slow start to the 1952–53 season Dooley eventually achieved a respectable 16 goals in 24 games but his career was abruptly ended on 14 February 1953, when he collided with the Preston goalkeeper George Thompson at Deepdale and broke his leg. An x-ray revealed that he sustained a double fracture. As he was preparing to leave hospital the following Monday a nurse noticed that there was no reaction in his toes when touched. When the Orthopedic cast was removed it was found that a small scratch on the back of his leg had become infected. Gangrene had set in and it was decided to amputate his leg. It was rumoured at the time that a chemical from the white touchline marking had got into his injury.

== Career after playing ==
After the injury a testimonial was played between a Sheffield XI and a team of internationals. It was attended by 55,000 supporters and raised £7,500. Another £2,700 was donated by local newspapers and £15,000 by a shilling fund held in the city. During the years immediately following the injury he took a job with a firm owned by one of the club directors. He also worked with the Wednesday junior team. He was put in charge of the club's development fund when it was launched in 1962.

He was the subject of This Is Your Life in 1961 when he was surprised by Eamonn Andrews at London's Kings Cross station.

Dooley became Sheffield Wednesday manager in January 1971 with the team in the lower half of the Second Division and having just exited the FA Cup. There were 16 games left in the season. Under Dooley's charge they won 3 matches collecting 11 points leaving them in 15th place at the end of the season. This was followed by another stuttering season that saw them finish just a place higher.

The 1972–73 season would prove to be Dooley's most successful in his short managerial career. Wednesday led the Second Division for a period near the beginning of the season eventually finishing 10th. The highlight of the season was beating First Division Crystal Palace. The next season started badly. The team was badly hit by a virus that affected a total of 16 players between early September and November. The board was radically changed in early December when the chairman and vice-chairman both resigned. Despite a slight improvement in form the new board decided to sack Derek Dooley on 24 December 1973. The decision left him bitter about his treatment and it would be almost twenty years before he would set foot in Hillsborough Stadium again.

After being sacked by Wednesday he took a job in public relations at a Leeds firm. He was then offered the position of Commercial Manager at the Owls' bitter rivals Sheffield United. He went on to have a variety of roles including the role of managing director before taking on the job of chairman of United's Football Club board. He also co-founded the "Senior Blades Club", with the late George McCabe.

== Later life ==
After declining several previous offers he finally accepted an invitation to watch the Sheffield derby at Hillsborough in 1992. There he was given a standing ovation by both sets of fans. He was also made a freeman of the City of Sheffield in 1993. In the 2003 New Year Honours, Dooley was appointed a Member of the Order of the British Empire (MBE) for services to association football. Later the same year he received an honorary doctorate degree from Sheffield Hallam University.

He retired as a Blades chief executive in 1996 but 3 years later he returned to the fold as chairman of the club. At the time United were £4 million in debt and languishing near the bottom of the second tier of English football. Under his chairmanship the club enjoyed a resurgence that saw them return to the Premiership after an absence of 12 years. In April 2006 with the club still celebrating promotion, Dooley announced his resignation of the chairmanship to take up the role of Vice-President.

== Death ==
Dooley died at home on 5 March 2008. Both Sheffield Wednesday and Sheffield United opened their own books of condolence the following day. United announced on 6 March 2008 that they would be naming their new youth academy after their former chairman. The following day the Blades announced that they would also be commissioning a statue of Dooley, which would be placed to the rear of the South Stand at Bramall Lane. There was a minute's silence prior to Wednesday's home game against QPR and Barnsley's FA Cup quarter-final tie against Chelsea on 8 March.

Dooley's funeral took place on 14 March 2008 at Sheffield Cathedral. The cathedral was surrounded by thousands of fans from Sheffield's two major clubs who listened to the service on loudspeakers. Inside, the service was attended by Bobby Charlton, Dickie Bird and former United managers Neil Warnock and Dave Bassett, both of whom read eulogies. Following the service a police motorbike outrider led the funeral cortège to a private service at a city crematorium.

== Permanent tributes ==
In 2008, the Council decided to rename part of the ring road as Derek Dooley Way, a move supported by his widow, Sylvia. In 2010, a statue of Dooley was erected at the Bramall Lane home of Sheffield United, to commemorate his service to the club.

== Career statistics ==
Derek Dooley at the English National Football Archive (subscription required)

Club	Season	League			FA Cup		Total	
Club	Season	Division	Apps	Goals	Apps	Goals	Apps	Goals
Lincoln City	1946–47	Third Division North	2	2	0	0	2	2
Sheffield Wednesday	1949–50	Second Division	1	0	0	0	1	0
Sheffield Wednesday	1950–51	First Division	1	0	0	0	1	0
Sheffield Wednesday	1951–52	Second Division	30	46	1	1	31	47
Sheffield Wednesday	1952–53	First Division	29	16	1	0	30	16
Sheffield Wednesday	Total		61	62	2	1	63	63
Career total			63	64	2	1	65	65
