= 1867–68 Sheffield Wednesday F.C. season =

English football club season

The Wednesday F.C.
1867–68 season
- Cromwell Cup: Winners
- Top goalscorer: Gillott (2)
- Biggest win: 4–0 vs Exchange, Cromwell Cup, 1 February 1868

The 1867–68 Season was Sheffield Wednesday F.C.'s first season after being formed on 5 September 1867. For this first season of their existence "The Wednesday" as they were called played their home matches on an open field known as "high field" in the present Highfields area of Sheffield. The actual location of the ground was on Upper Colver Road which no longer exists but was situated on the present day site of the Highfields Library which stands near the junction of London Road and Abbeydale Road.

== Formation ==
The club was initially a cricket team named The Wednesday Cricket Club after the day of the week on which they played their matches. The footballing side of the club was established to keep the team together and fit during the winter months. SWFC was born on the evening of Wednesday 4 September 1867 at a meeting at the Adelphi Hotel in Sheffield. The formation was announced two days later with the following statement in the Sheffield Independent newspaper:

SHEFFIELD WEDNESDAY CRICKET CLUB AND FOOTBALL CLUB. – At a general meeting held on Wednesday last, at the Adelphi Hotel, it was decided to form a football club in connection with the above influential cricket club, with the object of keeping together during the winter season the members of this cricket club. From the great unanimity which prevailed as to the desirability of forming the club, there is every reason to expect that it will take first rank. The office bearers were elected as follows: – President, Mr. B. Chatterton; vice-president and treasurer, Mr. F. S. Chambers; hon. Secretary, Mr. Jno. Marsh; assistant, Mr. Castleton. Committee: Messrs Jno. Rodgers, Jno. White, C. Stokes, and H. Bocking. About sixty were enrolled without any canvas, some of them being the best players of the town.

Even at this first meeting it became apparent that football would soon come to eclipse the cricketing side of the club. The formation of the football club came within a decade of the first football club in the world, Sheffield F.C., being formed. Hallam F.C. was set up shortly afterwards and by 1867 Association football was becoming very popular. The Wednesday played their first football match in October 1867 against the Mechanics Club at Norfolk Park, a game which they won by three goals and four rouges to nil.

== Cromwell Cup victory ==
Wednesday entered their first significant tournament in early 1868 when they took part in the Cromwell Cup, a knock out competition for four clubs. All the clubs invited to take part by Oliver Cromwell, stage-manager of the Theatre Royal in Sheffield, had been formed for less than two years. Wednesday defeated Exchange 4–0 at the Mackenzie Ground on 1 February in their first match to qualify for the final. A week later Garrick beat Wellington by a "rouge" to nil at Norfolk Park to set up a Wednesday v Garrick final on 15 February 1868 at Bramall Lane.

The Cromwell Cup final was the first match that Wednesday played in that an admittance fee was charged. A crowd of around 600 assembled at Bramall Lane for the final with Garrick winning the toss and electing to play with a strong wind at their back. Garrick had the better of the play in the first half and hit the post after ten minutes, however it was goal-less at half time. The second half was more evenly contested with Garrick having some dangerous attacking moments but Wednesday skipper John Marsh along with Denton and Whelan played well in defence to keep the score at 0–0 at full-time. Jenkinson, Broomhead and Alf Wood also had good games for Wednesday. It was decided to keep playing extra time until one of the teams scored. After ten minutes of extra time Wednesday scored when Whelan passed to Wood who played the ball into the goal mouth which resulted in a general melee. A Garrick defender hit the ball high into the air and when it dropped it hit somebody on the shoulder and went into the goal.

Wednesday skipper John Marsh was carried from the pitch by jubilant supporters although it was not until 16 March that he was presented with the cup by Oliver Cromwell at the Theatre Royal on the occasion of his benefit night. After the presentation of the cup the Wednesday players adjourned to the nearby Adelphi Hotel, where landlord Harry Sampson kept his promise and filled the cup with champagne.

== Results ==
Win Loss

=== Friendlies ===
19 October 1867	United Mechanics	0–3	Wednesday	Norfolk Park, Sheffield

23 November 1867	Heeley	1–0	Wednesday	Meersbrook Park, Sheffield

31 December 1867	Dronfield	0–1	Wednesday	Baggally's Field, Dronfield

11 January 1868	Wednesday	0–4	Heeley	Highfield, Sheffield

3 February 1868	Wednesday	0–1	United Mechanics	Highfield, Sheffield

=== Cromwell Cup ===
1 February 1868 Semi-final	Wednesday	4–0	Exchange	Myrtle Road, Sheffield
	Gillott; Jenkinson; Wood

15 February 1868 Final	Garrick	0–1 (a.e.t.)	Wednesday	Bramall Lane, Sheffield
			Scrimmage	Attendance: 600
