= Youdan Cup =

Youdan Football Cup
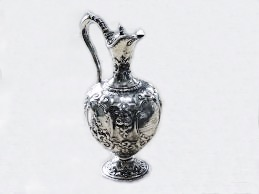
- The Youdan Football Cup trophy

Tournament details
- Country: England
- Venue: Sheffield
- Dates: 16 February 1867 – 9 March 1867
- Teams: 12

Final positions
- Champions: Hallam
- Runners-up: Norfolk

Tournament statistics
- Matches played: 13
- Goals scored: 10 (0.77 per match)

The Youdan Football Cup, also known as the Youdan Cup, was an 1867 Sheffield rules football competition. Preceding the FA Cup by more than four years, it was among the first tournaments in any code of football. (Note: Though the Youdan Cup was not the first football competition, no older tournament involving three or more independent clubs is known.: The House Football Cup of Eton College dates from 1860, but it is an intramural competition rather than a tournament between independent clubs (see Major [Earnest] Gambier-Parry (1907). Annals of an Eton house, with some notes on the Evans family. London: John Murray. p. 130.).; The Caledonian Challenge Cup in Australian rules football dates from 1861, but was only ever contested between two clubs at a time.; The Youdan Cup was recognized as the "oldest trophy" in the "soccer" section of Guinness World Records (see Guinness World Records 2003. New York: Bantam Books. 2003. p. 333. ISBN 0-553-58636-X.).)

== Background ==
Thomas Youdan, seen in 1865

The competition took its name from a local theatre owner, Thomas Youdan, who sponsored the competition and provided the trophy.

== Rules ==
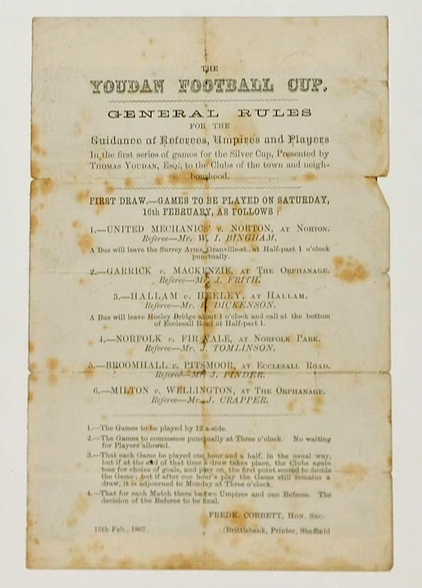
Handbill or programme for the cup, as featured on the BBC Television programme Antiques Roadshow in May 2021 (transcription)

On 28 January 1867, representatives of thirteen football clubs from the Sheffield area met at the Adelphi Hotel to form the "Youdan Prize Committee". The committee drew up the following regulations to govern the tournament:

- Matches would be played under Sheffield Rules.
- Matches would start at three o'clock, with two umpires and one referee.
- There would be 12 players on each side.
- Games would last ninety minutes. If the scores were tied, up to one hour of extra time would be played, with the first team to score during this period being declared the winner. If scores were still tied after extra time, the match would be replayed.

After the first round, the committee added a new rule that "the referee shall have power to award a Free Kick to the opponents of any Club, which makes more than three fouls or kicks-out, when the ball is being thrown in, if he (the referee) considers those fouls or kicks-out to be intentional".

== Participating teams ==
Participating clubs
Team	Foundation	No. of members	Home ground	Colours
Norton	1861	50	Norton	Green
United Mechanics	1865 (September)	140	Norfolk Park	Blue, white cap
Mackenzie	1862	500	Myrtle Road	Pink shirt, plaid cap
Garrick	1866 (October)	400	East Bank	Red, white, & blue
Hallam	1860	150	Sandygate	Blue & white
Heeley	1862	70	Wellsbrook Park	Grey & white hoops
Norfolk	1861 (December)	240	Norfolk Park	Grey & blue
Fir Vale	1862	136	Pitsmoor	White & red
Broomhall	1863 (October)	150	Ecclesall Road	Black & white
Pitsmoor	1861	264	Pitsmoor	White
Wellington	1866	150	Houndsfields Park	Puce & white
Milton	1862	180+	South Heeley	Black & yellow

Sheffield FC, the oldest and most prestigious local club, declined to participate in the competition. (Note: Harvey suggests that the club had withdrawn from playing against local rivals in order to "groom themselves for the national stage".)

== Format ==
The competition was organised as a straight knockout tournament, with two exceptions:

- Because twelve teams entered the tournament, there were three teams remaining after two rounds: one team, drawn at random, received a bye to the final, while the other two teams played a semi-final to determine the other finalist.
- After the final had been played, it was decided to hold a second-place playoff between the losing finalist and the losing semi-finalist.

The semi-final, final and second-place playoff were all held at Bramall Lane, which at the time was primarily a cricket ground.

== Results ==
Under the Sheffield Rules of the time, the rouge was used as a tiebreaker if both teams scored an equal number of goals. (Note: At least two different forms of the rouge are found in the Sheffield Rules: According to the 1862 Sheffield FC rules, a rouge was scored when an attempt at goal (using a goal only 4 yards wide) missed, but went between two "rouge flags" 4 yards to the side of each goalpost, and the ball was then touched down by an attacking player. A similar version of the rouge is found in the rules of Sheffield Mechanics Football Club for the 1865–66 season.; Under the rules issued by the Sheffield Football Association in March 1867 immediately after the tournament, the requirement for a touch down was removed; it was required only that the ball go between the rouge flags and beneath the crossbar.; A contemporary newspaper report of the final indicates that the winning rouge was "touched down by Ash in splendid style", suggesting that the first definition was used in this competition.)

Of the thirteen matches played in the tournament, seven were goalless, of which six were decided by rouges. Only one goal was scored after the first round.

In the results below, rouges are shown in brackets beneath the main scoreline.

=== First round ===
16 February 1867	Norton	2 – 0 (6–0)	United Mechanics	Norton
15:00				Referee: Mr. W. I. Bingham
Note: John Hadfield of United Mechanics suffered a dislocated shoulder.

16 February 1867	Mackenzie	1 – 0 (1–0)	Garrick	The Orphanage
15:00				Referee: Mr. J. Frith
Note:

16 February 1867	Hallam	2 – 0 (2–1)	Heeley	Sandygate Road
15:00				Referee: Mr. R. Dickenson
Note:

16 February 1867	Norfolk	2 – 0 (4–0)	Fir Vale	Norfolk Park
15:00				Referee: Mr. J. Tomlinson
Note:

16 February 1867	Broomhall	0 – 0 (2–0)	Pitsmoor	Ecclesall Road
15:00				Referee: Mr. J. Pinder
Note: "Nothing was got by either side until they changed ends at half time, and then the Broomhall, having a slight advantage in both the ground and wind, succeeded in getting a rouge, and soon after got another from a free kick". Broohmall: C. Mills (capt.), F. Hazlewood, John West, James West, J. Broadbent, S. Oeakin, W. Ward, W. Furniss, W. Mills, S. Dungworth, J. White, J. Turton; Pitsmoor: G. Fowler (capt.), J. F. Bingham, J. Peck, G. Simpson, S. M. Walker, J. Clarke, G. Bradley, S. Heaton, E. Osborne, H. Peck, H. Fitter, G. Barnes

16 February 1867	Wellington	0 – 2 (0–5)	Milton	The Orphanage
15:00				Referee: Mr. J. Crapper

=== Second round ===
23 February 1867	Norfolk	1 – 0 (0–0) (A.S.D.E.T)	Broomhall	Norfolk Park
15:00	Unknown (92')			Referee: Mr. R. Dickenson
Note:

23 February 1867	Norton	0 – 0 (0–0) (A.S.D.E.T)	Hallam	Norton
15:00				Referee: Mr. W.J. Bingham
Note:

23 February 1867	Mackenzie	0 – 0 (1–0)	Milton	The Orphanage
15:00	Unknown (30')			Referee: Mr. J. Crapper
Note: Green, playing for Mackenzie, broke his collar bone.

Replay

25 February 1867	Hallam	0 – 0 (1–0)	Norton
15:00	Unknown (60')

=== Semi-finals ===
2 March 1867	Hallam	0 – 0 (4–0)	Mackenzie	Bramall Lane
15:00				Referee: Mr. J. Tomlinson

Norfolk	Bye

=== Final ===
5 March 1867	Hallam	0–0 (2–0)	Norfolk	Bramall Lane
15:00	Ash (75' or 85'), unknown	Report		Attendance: 2000; Referee: Mr. J. Tomlinson
Note: Although contemporary reports are not completely consistent, the majority indicate a 2–0 scoreline: "Thus Hallam won, scoring two rouges to their opponents' nothing"; "Up to within a few minutes of the expiration of the time allotted neither club had gained a single point, but within the last five minutes the Hallam Club scored two rouges and won the prize"; "After a severe struggle Hallam eventually won the cup by two rouges"; However, one source indicates a one-rouge margin: "Hallam won by one rouge"; A BBC article from 2014 reports the score as 2–1 (without specifying rouges or goals).

=== Second place play-off ===
9 March 1867	Mackenzie	0 – 0 (0–1)	Norfolk	Bramall Lane
15:00
Note: Although Norfolk won "it was pretty generally admitted that the Mackenzie played the best". Mackenzie: W. Wright, T. Jenkinson, J. Marsh, J. Ellin, J. Broomhead, T. Hodgkinson, M. Hodgkinson, C. Webster, H. Packard, T. Rycroft, E. Birkhead, Bramall; Norfolk: J. Roberts (capt.), T. S. Bell, J. Pashley, J. P. Donovan, H. Cauthorne, T. Goodwin, C. Grayson, C. Marshall, J. Wildblood, G. Rodgers, G. Proctor, J. Simmonite.

== Trophy ==
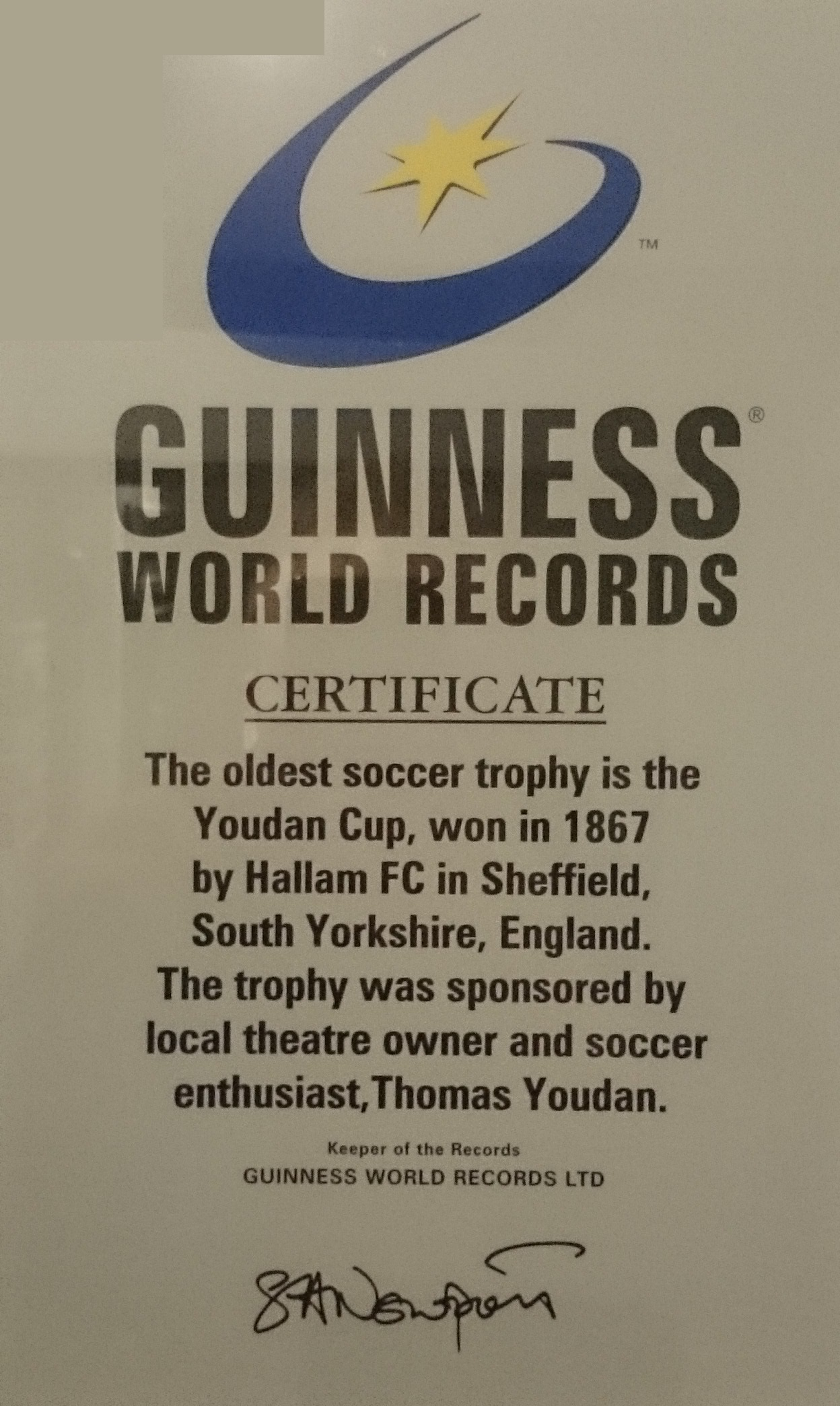
The certificate which stands at Sandygate Road.

The Youdan Prize Committee invited members of the public to submit their proposed designs for the trophy. The creator of the entry judged the best would be rewarded by Thomas Youdan with a prize of one sovereign.

This prize was initially awarded to a Mr Jarvis, of Roscoe Works. His design was subsequently combined with that of another entrant: Mr. Topham, engraver, who was awarded a further prize of one pound.

Before the semi-final, it was decided that the second-placed club would also be awarded a prize, to be funded by an admission fee of 3d at the semi-final and final. This prize ended up being valued at £2 10s.

The trophies were presented at a dinner held at the Adelphi Hotel on Monday 11 March. Because the winning design required "protracted time [...] in its manufacture", it had not been completed in time for the ceremony. In its place, a "richly-ornamented claret jug", created by Martin, Hall, and Co., was awarded to Hallam. Thomas Youdan was absent through illness, so the trophy was presented by Mr J. Birley to J. C. Shaw, Hallam's captain. The second prize, a "double-handed goblet [...] enriched with athletic figures", was awarded to Norfolk.

The inscription on the cup awarded to Hallam reads:

FOOTBALL CHALLENGE CUP. This Silver Cup Presented By Thos. Youdan, Esq to be contested for by the various Football Clubs in Sheffield & the Neighbourhood was awarded to the Hallam Football Club Feb. 1867 J.C.Shaw Esq. Capt

Shaw presented the trophy to the members of the Hallam Club at a dinner after the final match of their season, played at Sandygate on Saturday 16 March. The first-place trophy was subsequently lost. It did not resurface again until 1997, when a Scottish antiques collector contacted Hallam F.C. to tell them that he was in possession of it – they subsequently bought it back for £1,600. Since then it has been valued to be worth at least £100,000 by silver specialist Alastair Dickenson of the BBC programme Antiques Roadshow, although the owners have insisted it is not for sale.

== Legacy ==
Attendances of up to 3,000 were reported in the press. This would not be exceeded by the reported attendance at an FA Cup final until 1878.

Contemporary reports suggest that the 1867 tournament was expected to be repeated in subsequent years, with Youdan awarding a trophy of the original competition-winning design. This did not occur, and in the event the Cromwell Cup was held in 1868, sponsored and named after another Sheffield theatre owner. Youdan nevertheless maintained an interest in football, for example by donating £50 in prize money to the Sheffield Football Association in 1870.

The work of the ad-hoc Youdan Prize Committee in co-ordinating activity between local clubs and framing rules was a precursor to that of the Sheffield Football Association, which had already been formed by the end of January 1867, and issued its own first set of rules on 6 March 1867, the day following the final of the Youdan Cup.

The Youdan Trophy, a Sheffield-based international youth team tournament founded in 2014, takes its name from the Youdan Cup.

== Sources ==
- Harvey, Adrian (2005). Football: The First Hundred Years: the Untold Story. Routledge. ISBN 978-0-415-35019-8.
