= Sheaf House (stadium) =

Football stadium in Sheffield, England

Coordinates: 53°22′4″N 1°28′14″W

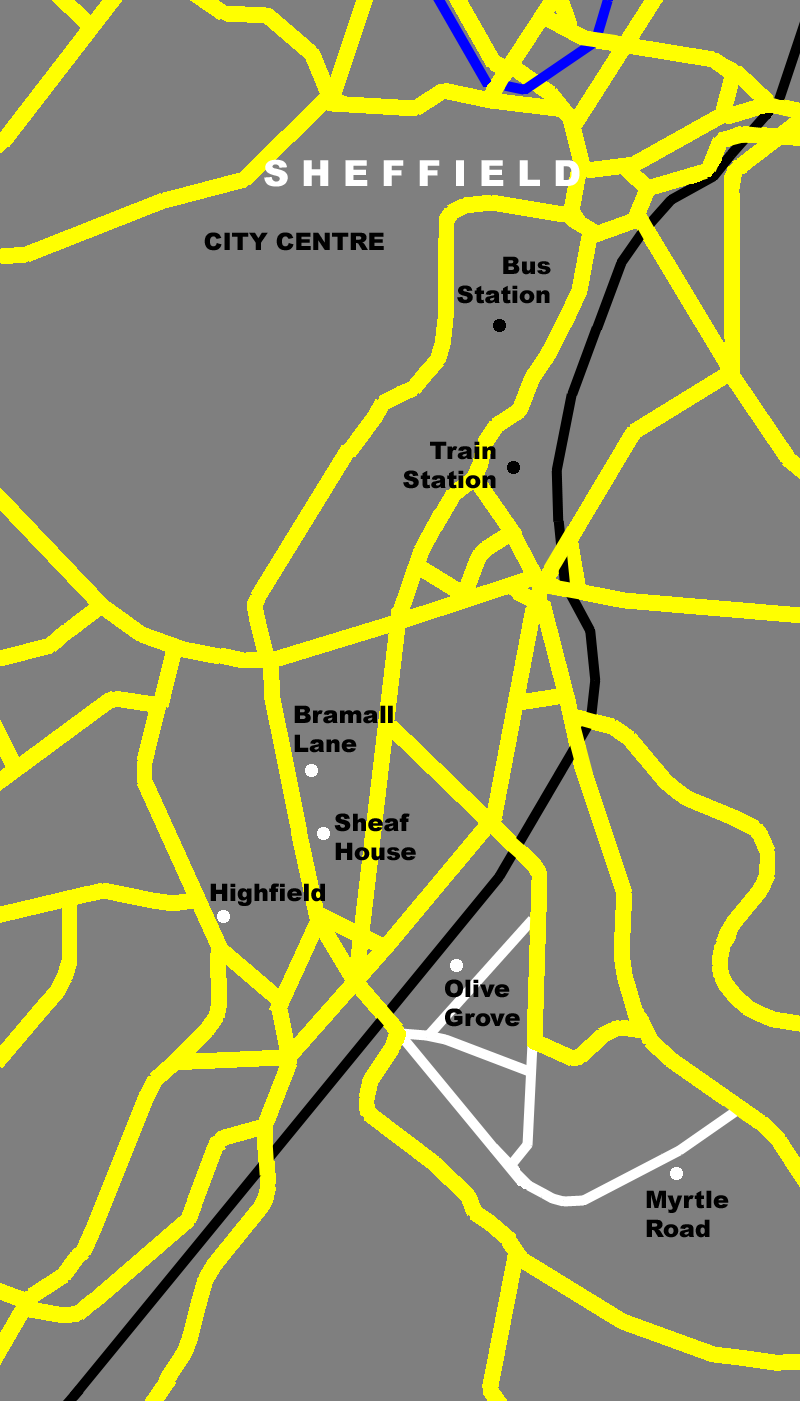
Modern day map of Sheffield showing the locations of the early home grounds of The Wednesday (north-south): Bramall Lane, Sheaf House, Highfield, Olive Grove and Myrtle Road.

Sheaf House is a former home ground of The Wednesday Football Club and was located near the centre of Sheffield, South Yorkshire, England. The club started to use the ground after leaving Myrtle Road in 1877 and it remained their main 'home' ground until 1880. At that point most home matches switched to Bramall Lane, however Wednesday continued to play some games at Sheaf House until Olive Grove was opened in 1887.

Sheaf House was less suitable for hosting football matches than Bramall Lane (which was situated very close to the ground) but it was apparently cheaper to rent.

The ground has since been covered by a new development, however the Sheaf House pub which used to stand at the corner of the ground is still there.
