= List of Sheffield Wednesday F.C. managers =

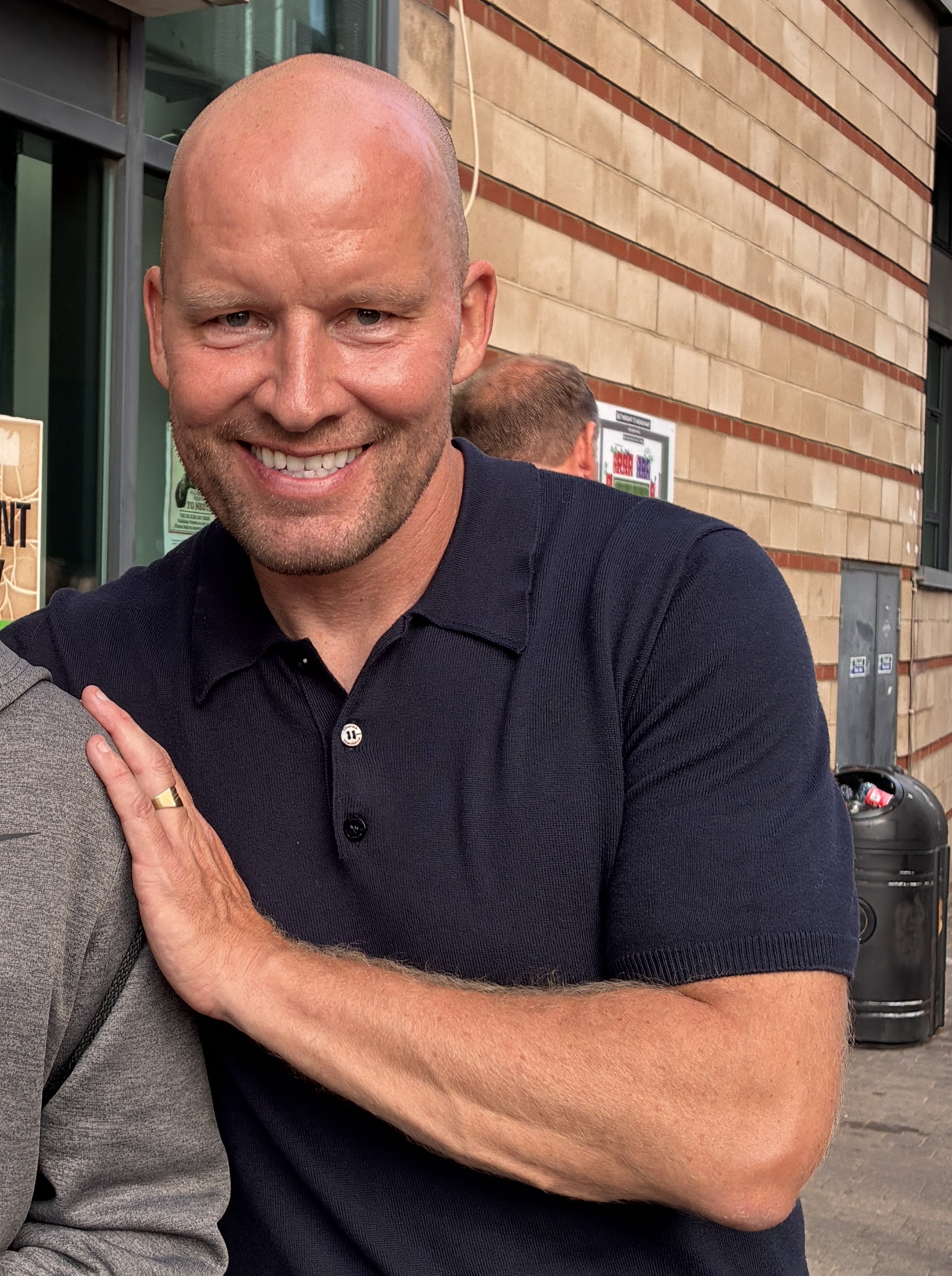
Henrik Pedersen led the club through their administration

This is a List of Sheffield Wednesday F.C. managers. Their first and longest serving manager was Arthur Dickinson who was appointed in 1891. There have been a total of 38 managers appointed to the role on a permanent basis and a further four have taken the position in a caretaker role. The vast majority have been English and until 2015 the club had not hired a manager from outside of the United Kingdom.

Arthur Dickinson is also the club's most successful manager so far, winning two First Division titles (1902–03 and 1903–04) and the same number of FA Cups (1896 and 1907). Robert Brown was in charge during Wednesday's two other league championship successes in 1928–29 and 1929–30. The last FA Cup was won during Billy Walker's reign at the end of the 1935 season. Ron Atkinson masterminded the club's only League Cup triumph in 1991. His successor, Trevor Francis, took the club to third place in Football's top tier in the 1991–92 season, before he became the only manager to lose both the FA Cup and League Cup finals in the same year in 1993.

== Key ==
- All first-team matches in national competition are counted, except the abandoned 1939–40 Football League season and matches in wartime leagues and cups.
- P = matches played; W = matches won; D = matches drawn; L = matches lost; Win % = win percentage (rounded to two decimal places)
- Statistics are complete up to and including the match played on 16 March 2025.

== Managers ==
As of 20 November 2026

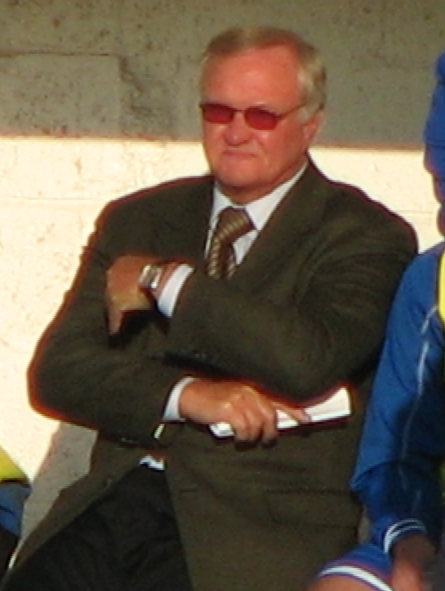
Ron Atkinson was Sheffield Wednesday's 17th and 20th manager, the only person to manage the club in two spells.

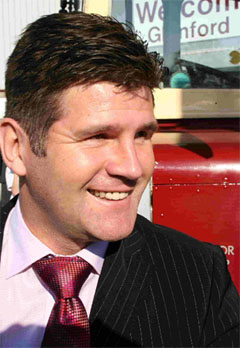
Brian Laws was the 27th manager of Sheffield Wednesday. He was succeeded by Alan Irvine.

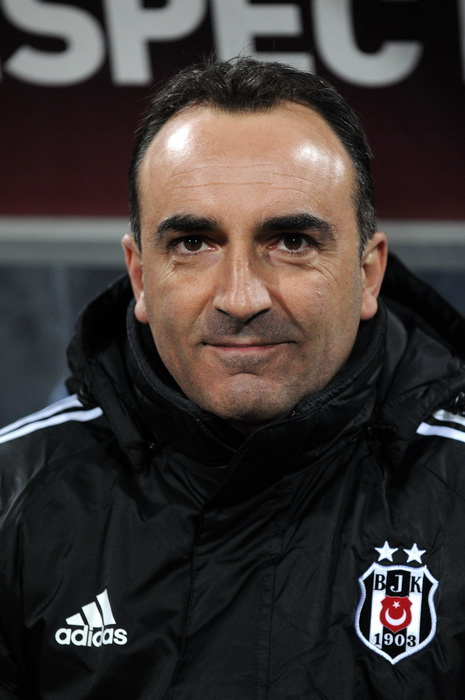
Carlos Carvalhal was the 32nd manager of Sheffield Wednesday. He was succeeded by Jos Luhukay.

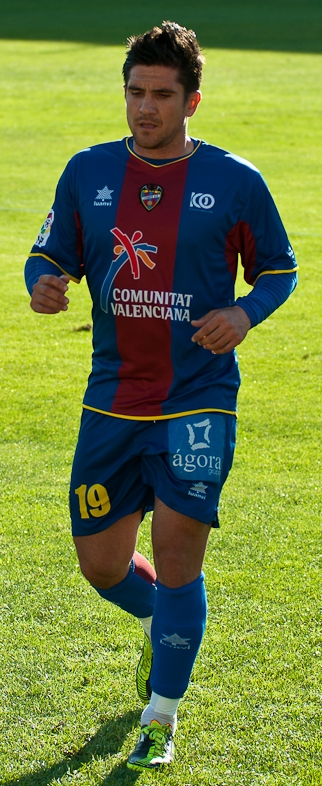
Xisco Muñoz is the worst Sheffield Wednesday manager on record.

#	Name	Nationality	From	To	P	W	L	D	Win %
1	Arthur Dickinson	England	August 1891	May 1920	919	393	338	188	42.76
2	Robert Brown	England	June 1920	December 1933	600	266	199	135	44.33
3	Billy Walker	England	December 1933	November 1937	187	66	68	53	35.29
4	Jimmy McMullan	Scotland	December 1937	April 1942	77	33	21	23	42.86
5	Eric Taylor	England	April 1942	July 1958	539	196	215	128	36.36
6	Harry Catterick	England	August 1958	April 1961	138	77	30	31	55.80
7	Vic Buckingham	England	1 June 1961	9 April 1964	134	63	47	24	47.01
8	Alan Brown	England	1 August 1964	February 1968	174	60	70	44	34.48
9	Jack Marshall	England	February 1968	April 1969	48	12	20	16	25.00
10	Danny Williams	England	August 1969	January 1971	67	16	35	16	23.88
11	Derek Dooley	England	January 1971	24 December 1973	130	41	54	35	31.54
12	Steve Burtenshaw	England	29 January 1974	1 October 1975	68	13	38	17	19.12
13	Len Ashurst	England	15 October 1975	5 October 1977	92	31	34	27	33.70
14	Jack Charlton	England	8 October 1977	27 May 1983	269	105	77	87	39.03
15	Howard Wilkinson	England	24 June 1983	10 October 1988	255	114	73	68	44.71
16	Peter Eustace	England	28 October 1988	14 February 1989	18	2	9	7	11.11
17	Ron Atkinson	England	14 February 1989	6 June 1991	118	49	34	35	41.53
18	Trevor Francis	England	7 June 1991	20 May 1995	214	88	58	68	41.12
19	David Pleat	England	14 June 1995	3 November 1997	102	32	40	30	31.37
20	Ron Atkinson	England	14 November 1997	17 May 1998	27	9	11	7	33.33
21	Danny Wilson	Northern Ireland	6 July 1998	21 March 2000	80	23	40	17	28.75
22	Paul Jewell	England	21 June 2000	12 February 2001	38	12	21	5	31.58
23	Peter Shreeves	England	12 February 2001	17 October 2001	31	11	11	9	35.48
24	Terry Yorath	Wales	17 October 2001	31 October 2002	56	16	25	15	28.57
25	Chris Turner	England	7 November 2002	19 September 2004	96	29	36	31	30.21
26	Paul Sturrock	Scotland	23 September 2004	19 October 2006	104	35	40	29	33.65
27	Brian Laws	England	6 November 2006	13 December 2009	154	52	60	42	33.77
28	Alan Irvine	Scotland	8 January 2010	3 February 2011	59	24	22	13	40.68
29	Gary Megson	England	4 February 2011	29 February 2012	62	28	22	12	45.16
30	Dave Jones	England	1 March 2012	1 December 2013	81	29	30	22	35.80
31	Stuart Gray	England	1 December 2013	11 June 2015	68	26	19	23	38.24
32	Carlos Carvalhal	Portugal	30 June 2015	24 December 2017	131	56	38	37	42.75
33	Jos Luhukay	Netherlands	5 January 2018	21 December 2018	48	16	13	19	33.33
34	Steve Bruce	England	1 February 2019	17 July 2019	18	7	3	8	38.89
35	Garry Monk	England	6 September 2019	9 November 2020	58	18	15	25	31.03
36	Tony Pulis	Wales	13 November 2020	28 December 2020	10	1	4	5	10.00
37	Darren Moore	Jamaica	1 March 2021	19 June 2023	129	66	29	34	51.16
38	Xisco Muñoz	Spain	4 July 2023	4 October 2023	12	0	8	4	0.00
39	Danny Röhl	Germany	13 October 2023	29 July 2025	89	34	34	21	38.20
40	Henrik Pedersen	Denmark	31 July 2025	25 October 2026	65	10	38	17	15.38
41	Dave Challinor	England	3 November 2026	Present	4	2	2	0	50.00
