= Norfolk F.C. =

Former association football club in England

Norfolk
- Full name: Norfolk Football Club
- Founded: December 1861
- Dissolved: c. 1881
- Ground: Norfolk Park
- Secretary: H. F. Bryars (1869–72); John Pashley (1872–73); R. C. Marsden (1873–77); G. Cropper (1877–81)
1861–74 colours

Norfolk Football Club was an English football club based in the Norfolk Park suburb of Sheffield.

== History ==
It played Sheffield rules football from its foundation in 1861 until that code merged with association football in 1877, and association football thereafter until its demise some time in or after 1881.

Norfolk finished second in the 1867 Youdan Cup. The club was responsible for proposing the introduction of the corner-kick into Sheffield Rules in 1868; the corner would subsequently be introduced into association football in 1872.

During the amateur era, the club was one of the largest in Sheffield, and boasted of a positive cash balance of £60 in 1873. However, as professionalism entered the game Norfolk failed to keep track; it did not enter the FA Cup at all, and in the first Sheffield Challenge Cup in 1876–77, was beaten in the first round by the unfancied Philadelphia club, a shot from Aaron Ambler deflecting in off Bennett Ward. Norfolk's chances were not helped by several players walking off near the end in protest at a claim for a goal being turned down, the referee judging that a high shot from Taylor grazed the junction of post and tape, but crucially had gone over the tape. The last known reference to the club in the press dates from 1881.

== Colours ==
The club's colours were originally grey and blue. In 1874 they became scarlet with a blue cap and from 1875 scarlet and white.

== Ground ==
The club played originally at Norfolk Park. In 1880, the club reported to the Football Annual that it had moved away from its ground in Norfolk Park to Quibell's Field, near Hyde Park.
