= Thomas Youdan =

English theatre proprietor (1816-1876)

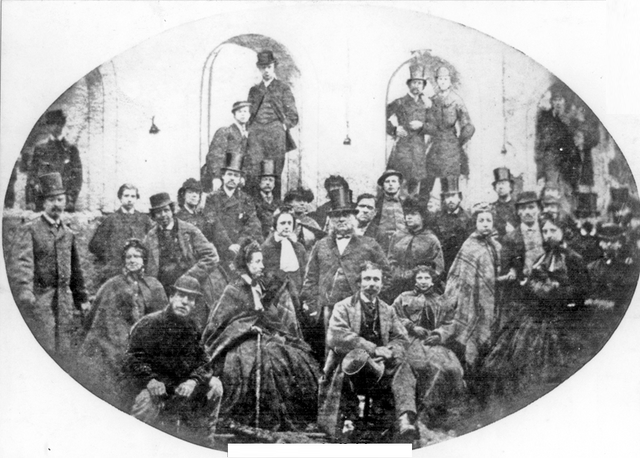
- Youdan (centre, in stovepipe hat) with the Surrey Theatre company outside the shell of the building after the fire on 25 March 1865
- Born: 1816; Streetthorpe, Yorkshire
- Died: November 18, 1876 (aged 60); Filey, Yorkshire
- Occupation: Theatre proprietor

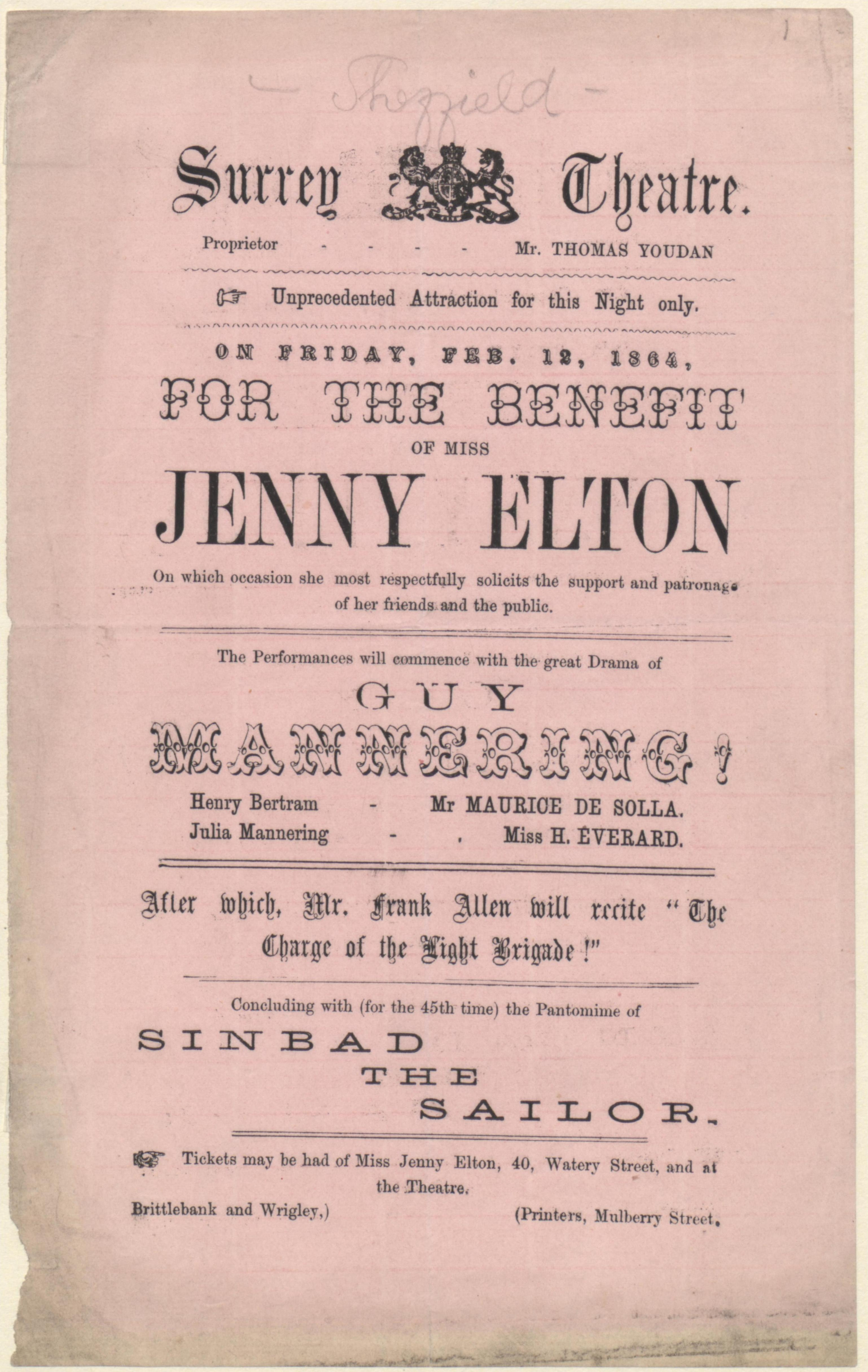
Surrey Theatre handbill of 1864, naming Youdan as proprietor

Thomas Youdan (1816-1876) was a theatre proprietor in Sheffield, England, known for sponsoring the Youdan Football Cup, the first ever multi-club tournament in the history of football.

Youdan was born in Streetthorpe near Doncaster, the son of a farm labourer. He was baptized on 19 May 1816. At the age of 18 he moved to Sheffield, where he was employed as a labourer and a silver stamper. He then ran a public house, and later built the Surrey Theatre on the site of a former pawn shop. The Surrey Theatre contained a ballroom, theatre, concert-hall, and even a menagerie.

In 1858, Youdan was elected to Sheffield City Council. He served as a councillor for six years.

The Surrey Theatre burned down in 1865, which caused Youdan to lose nearly £30,000. He then converted a storage building into the Alexandra Opera House, before retiring in 1874, and returning to the countryside. He died on 28 November 1876 at his residence of Flotmanly House, near Filey.

Youdan was a prolific philanthropist. In addition to endowing the Youdan Cup, he made generous donations to charities of all kinds.
