= Olive Grove =

Name origin

Coordinates: 53°21′58″N 1°27′56″W

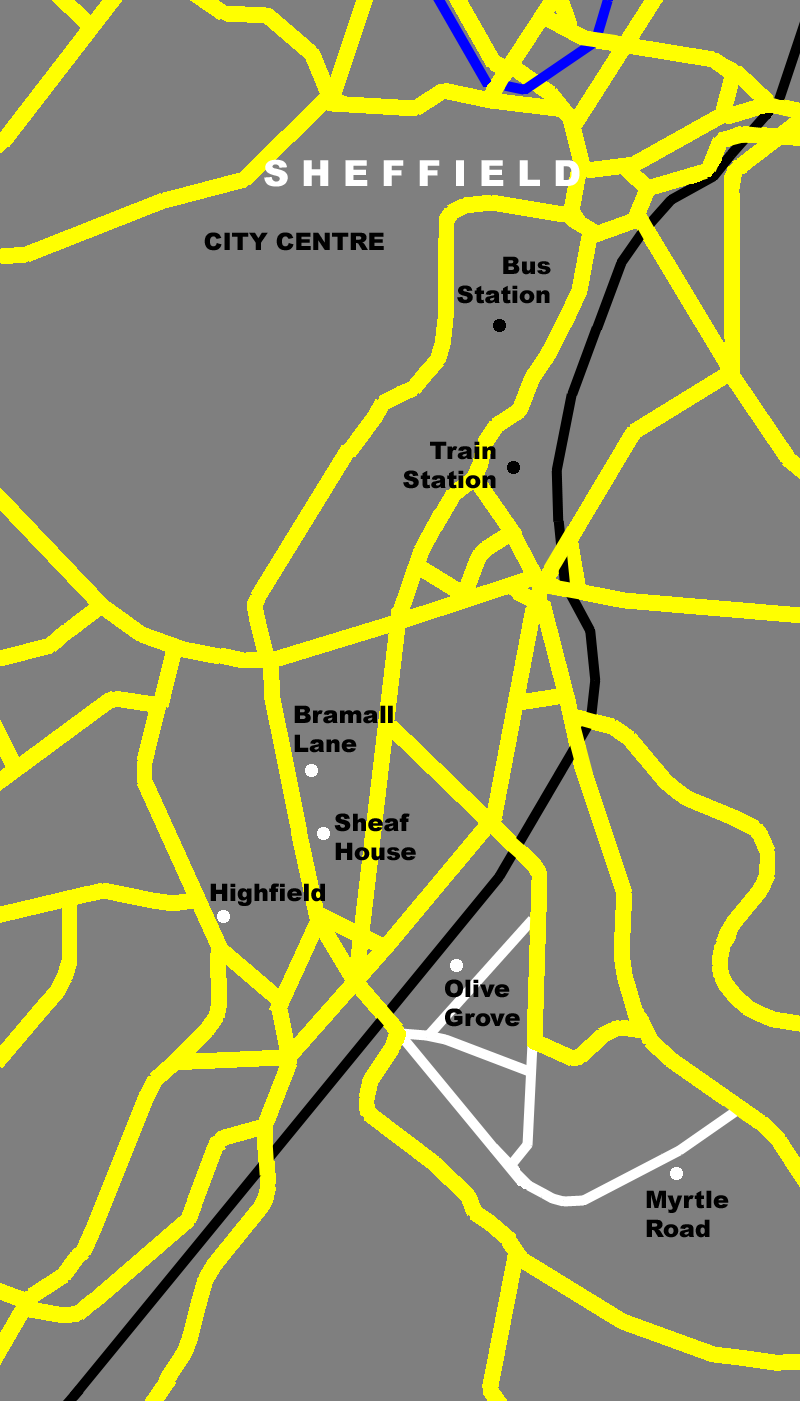
Modern day map of Sheffield showing the locations of the early home grounds of The Wednesday (north-south): Bramall Lane, Sheaf House, Highfield, Olive Grove and Myrtle Road.

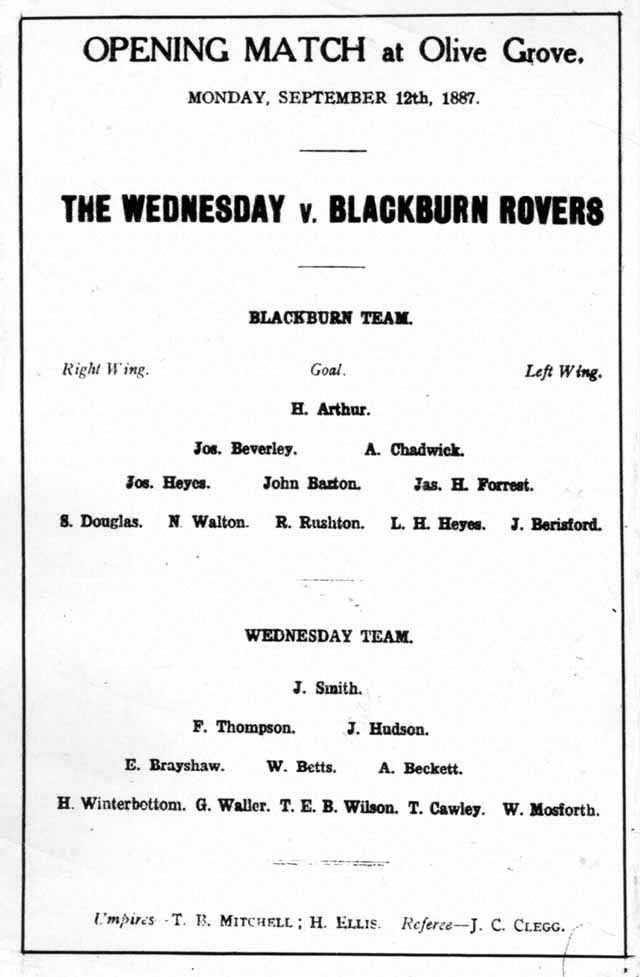
Leaflet advertising the opening match at Olive Grove between 'The Wednesday' and Blackburn Rovers.

Olive Grove was The Wednesday F.C.'s first permanent football ground, home to the club for just over a decade at the end of the 19th century. It was located on the site of what is now Sheffield City Council's Olive Grove Depot, near Queens Road in the centre of Sheffield. (The Wednesday FC became Sheffield Wednesday later) In November 2009 it was announced that the world's oldest football club, Sheffield F.C., plan to return to its Sheffield roots with an 'iconic' 10,000 capacity stadium 1/4 of a mile away from the original Olive Grove Ground.

Olive Grove was situated near Bramall Lane; just south of the city centre next to the railway tracks on Queens Road, on land leased from the Duke of Norfolk. However, it was in no fit state to host football matches and over £5,000 had to be spent developing the site. Even then, the ground still lacked basic facilities; early on the players even had to get changed at a local pub before matches.

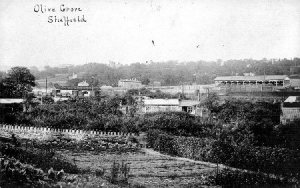
Olive Grove Stadium, Sheffield

Prior to the opening of the ground, Wednesday had used several other sites, including Sheaf House and Bramall Lane, before newly formed rivals Sheffield United took up permanent residence there. It was decided that the club should have its own stadium to avoid paying a percentage of gate receipts to the owners of the grounds used. Having their own stadium would also make it easier for Wednesday to accommodate their ever-growing fan base. The first match to be played at the completed stadium was against Blackburn Rovers on 12 September 1887, resulting in a 4–4 draw, with Wednesday coming back from 4–1 behind. Whilst at Olive Grove, Wednesday entered league football for the first time in 1889 by playing in the new Football Alliance. They won 15 out of their 22 matches to clinch the title in the first season, before finally being granted admission to the Football League in 1892. The first game at Olive Grove at this level was Wednesday's 5–2 win over Accrington. However, the club experienced a poor season and narrowly avoided relegation from the First Division.

Despite steady improvement on the pitch over the following years, the days would soon be numbered for Olive Grove. Plans were made to expand the railway track beside the ground, and as a result, Wednesday's lease would not be renewed. To make matters worse, the final season at Olive Grove was a disaster; the team lost more than half of their 34 matches and were relegated from the top tier of English football for the first time. Things looked very bad for the club. In the spring of 1899 shares in Wednesday were issued to raise capital for a brand new stadium. Two sites were proposed for the development – Carbrook, in the North East of the city, and Owlerton, then a rural area to the North West; an alternative was a return to Sheaf House. Both new sites could not be obtained, but a new one became available in Owlerton, and work soon began on Owlerton Stadium, later to be renamed Hillsborough, now one of the most famous football stadia in the country.

== Sheffield FC ==
In November 2009, Sheffield FC announced, after months of speculation, they planned to build a 10,000 capacity stadium at Olive Grove. This move was speculated for quite some time, as the club wished to return to its roots in Sheffield.

The world's oldest football club had hoped that England's bid to host the 2018 World Cup would be successful, and that spin-off grants would enable them to complete an ambitious multi-million pound bid to move back 'home' to Olive Grove in 2010. Despite the club having never played a single home match here.

But FIFA's decision late in 2010 to award the tournament to Russia meant that Sheffield FC, who currently play at Dronfield's Coach and Horses ground, had to shelve the plans.

But the club remain determined to make the move, and admit that Olive Grove "is still an option".

"England not getting the 2018 World Cup was a blow", Sheffield FC chairman Richard Tims told The Telegraph.

"We’re just weighing up our options at the moment. We are still looking at moving home, but not quite on the scale we previously were".

In 2015, Sheffield FC relaunched their campaign to move back to Olive Grove, with funds dependent on donations from supporters. Clubs including Aston Villa, FC St. Pauli and Hertha BSC have all voiced their support of the campaign.

== Records ==
Due to poor record keeping, it is difficult to give an accurate figure for the record attendance at Olive Grove. For many games the attendance was simply listed as "Good" or "Poor" and when figures were recorded these were only estimates. However, an attendance of 20,000 was recorded at the FA Cup 3rd round match against West Bromwich Albion on 14 February 1891 and this was probably a record for the stadium. The record receipts for a match at Olive Grove were for the third round FA Cup tie played on 29 February 1896 between The Wednesday and Everton when a sum of £889 6s 9d was paid by the crowd to see Wednesday win 4–0.
