= Myrtle Road =

Football ground in Sheffield, South Yorkshire, England

Coordinates: 53°21′39″N 1°27′30″W

- Interactive map of Myrtle Road
- Address: Myrtle Road; Sheffield; England
- Event: sporting events

Tenant
- The Wednesday Football Club (1870–1877)

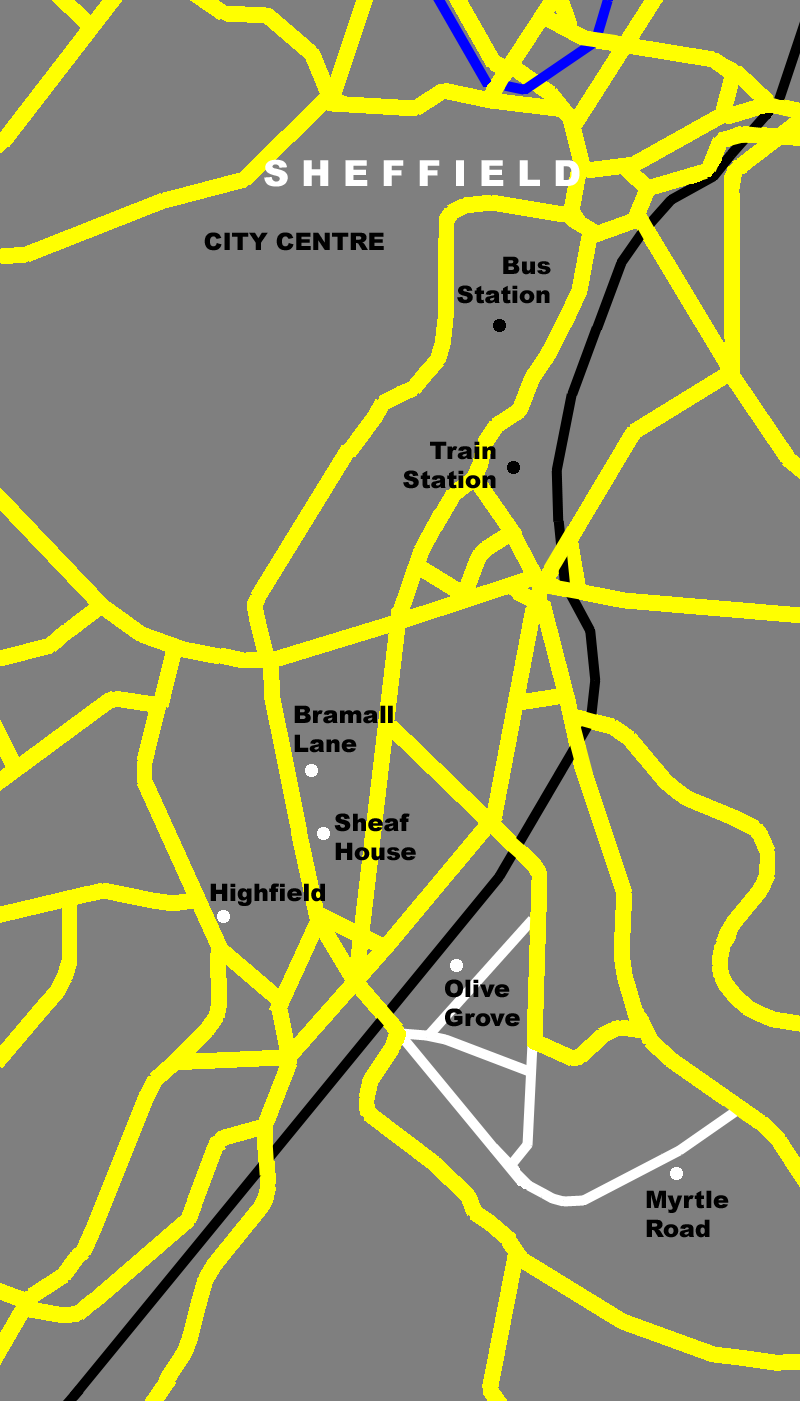
Modern day map of Sheffield showing the locations of the early home grounds of The Wednesday (north-south): Bramall Lane, Sheaf House, Highfield, Olive Grove and Myrtle Road.

Myrtle Road is a former home ground of The Wednesday Football Club and was located on the street of the same name, near the centre of Sheffield, South Yorkshire, England. In 1870 Wednesday left Highfield and made the short trip to Myrtle Road. The exact location of the site is not known although the road is on a very steep hill and it is thought that the ground was near the top. It has been suggested that Wednesday played on the Ball Inn Recreation Ground on the south side of Myrtle Road as this is the only flat piece of land in the area.

Wednesday stayed at Myrtle Road until 1877 when they played their last game there, a 0–0 draw in front of a large attendance against Heeley. Wednesday then moved again to Sheaf House.
