= Highfield (stadium) =

Stadium in Sheffield, South Yorkshire, England

Coordinates: 53°22′2″N 1°28′28″W

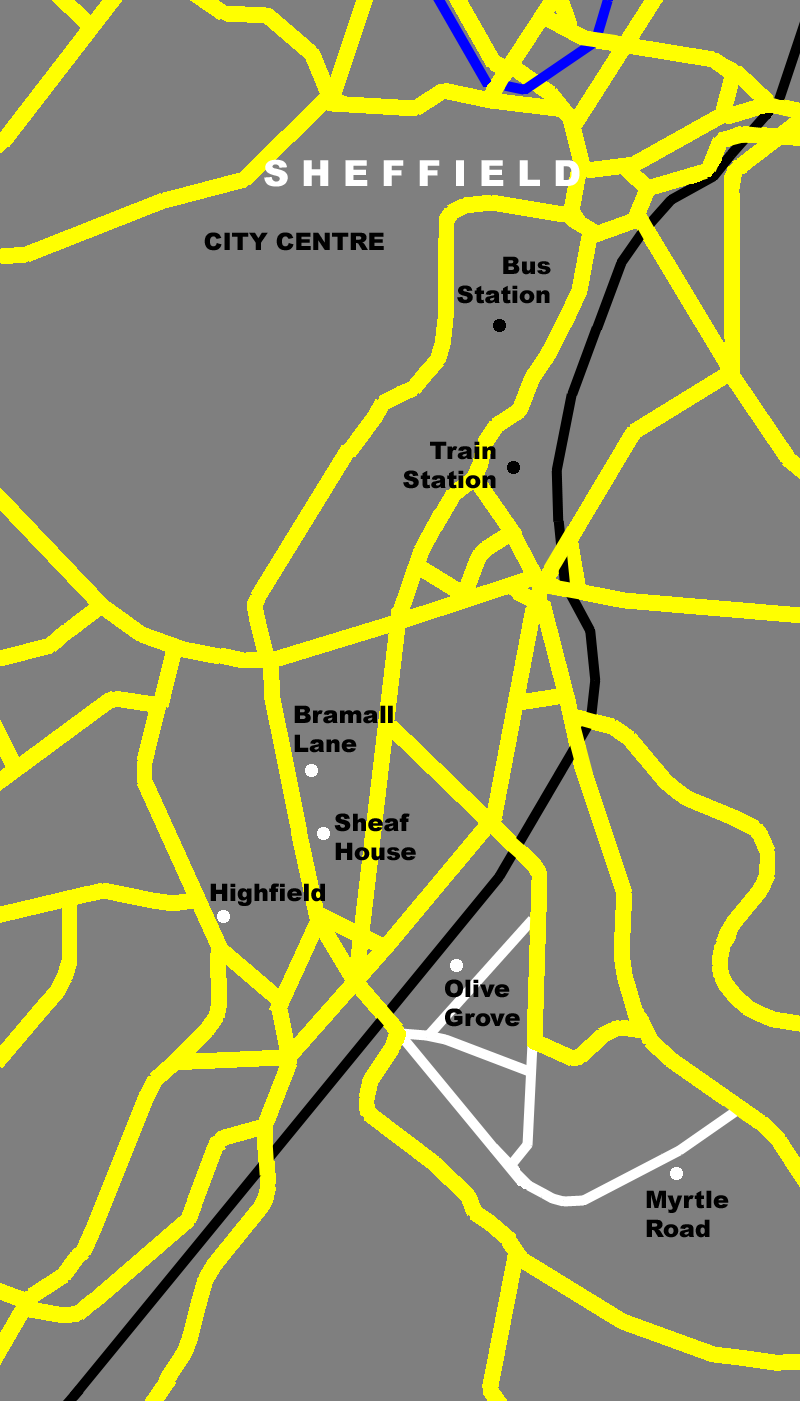
Modern day map of Sheffield showing the locations of the early home grounds of The Wednesday (north-south): Bramall Lane, Sheaf House, Highfield, Olive Grove and Myrtle Road.

Highfield is a former home ground of The Wednesday Football Club and was located on London Road near to the centre of Sheffield, South Yorkshire, England. The club started to use the ground when they formed in 1867 and continued to use the ground until moving to Myrtle Road in 1870.

The ground was a field that was part of a recreational ground that was at the time called the Orphanage, having just changed their name from the Cremorne Gardens (named after the gardens in London and after which The Cremorne public house was named). Charles Blondin, the high wire artist, was reported to have performed in the gardens. They also provided the home ground for Mackenzie F.C. during the 1867 Youdan Cup.

The site is now thought to be occupied by the Highfield library.
