= Arthur Dickinson (football manager) =

English football manager and secretary (died 1930)

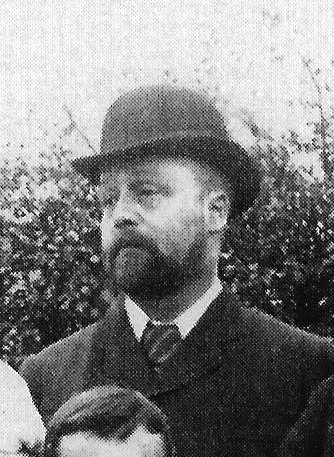
Dickinson in 1896

Arthur Dickinson (died 4 November 1930) was manager and honorary secretary of Sheffield Wednesday. He became Sheffield Wednesday's first manager in 1891 and its honorary secretary two years later. He remains the club's longest serving and most successful manager with 393 wins, 338 losses, and 188 draws in 919 games with the club. He also managed the club to two league titles and two FA Cups during his 29-year reign. He first offered his resignation in the middle of the troubled 1919-20 season but was convinced to stay on to the end of the season.

He died at the Euston Hotel in London on 4 November 1930.

== See also ==
- List of English football championship winning managers
