= Sheffield Wednesday F.C. =

Association football club in England

Sheffield Wednesday
- Full name: Sheffield Wednesday Football Club
- Nickname: The Owls
- Short name: SWFC
- Founded: 4 September 1867; 159 years ago as The Wednesday
- Ground: Hillsborough Stadium
- Capacity: 39,732
- Owner: Arise Capital Partners LLC
- Chairman: David Storch
- Head coach: Dave Challinor
- League: EFL League One
- 2025–26: EFL Championship, 24th of 24 (relegated)
- Website: swfc.co.uk
Home colours	Away colours	Third colours

Sheffield Wednesday Football Club is a professional football club based in Sheffield, South Yorkshire, England. The club competes in EFL League One, the third tier of English football, following relegation from the EFL Championship in 2025–26. The club is owned by Arise Capital Partners LLC.

Formed in 1867 as an offshoot of The Wednesday Cricket Club (itself formed in 1820), they were known as The Wednesday Football Club until 1929. Wednesday is one of the oldest surviving football clubs in the world of any code, and the second-oldest professional association football club in England. (Note: Excluding clubs with informal or disputed foundation dates) In 1868 its team won the Cromwell Cup, only the second tournament of its kind. They were founding members and inaugural champions of the Football Alliance in 1889, before joining The Football League three years later. In 1992, they became founder members of the Premier League. The team has spent most of its league history in English football's top two flights, but has not played in the top tier since 2000.

The Owls, as they are nicknamed, are one of the most successful teams in English football by major honours, having won four league titles, three FA Cups, one League Cup and one FA Community Shield. Wednesday have also competed in UEFA cup competitions on four occasions, reaching the quarter-finals of the Inter-Cities Fairs Cup in 1963. In 1991, they defeated Manchester United 1–0 in the Football League Cup final as a second-tier team. As of 2026, they remain the last team to win one of English football's major trophies while outside the top flight.

In the 19th century, they played their matches at several stadiums around central Sheffield, including Olive Grove and Bramall Lane. Since 1899, the club has played all its home matches at Hillsborough Stadium, a near-40,000 capacity stadium in the north-west Sheffield suburb of Owlerton. Wednesday's biggest rivals are Sheffield United, with whom they contest the Steel City derby.

== History ==
=== Early years (1867–1889) ===
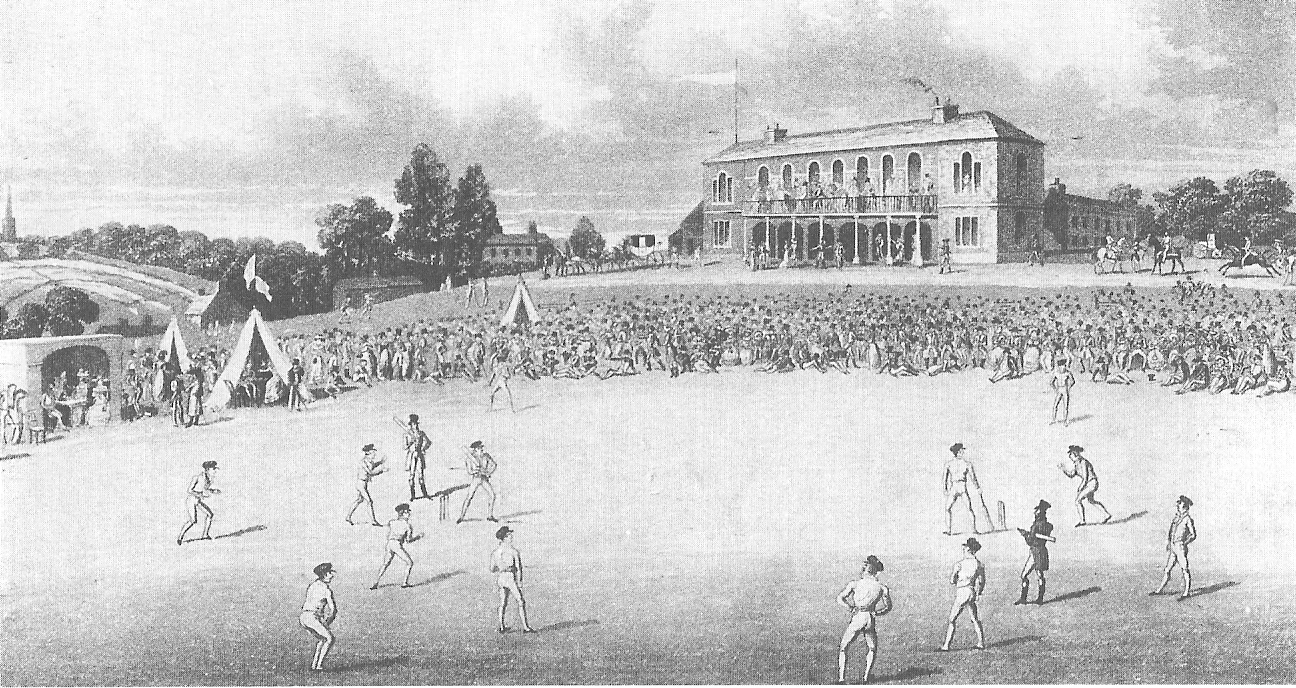
A cricket match at Darnall in the 1820s, a ground laid out for The Wednesday Cricket Club.

Although no contemporaneous evidence has been found to support the claim, it is commonly believed that "The Wednesday Cricket Club" was formed in 1820. Nevertheless, an 1842 article in Bell's Life magazine states the club was founded as far back as 1816.

The club was so named because it was on Wednesdays that the founding members had a half-day off work. They were initially based at the New Ground in Darnall, and often went by the name of Darnall Wednesday, but also played at Hyde Park. In 1855 they were one of six clubs that helped build Bramall Lane, and held a wicket there for many years.

Famous players to have represented the cricket club include Harry Sampson, who scored 162 on ice in 1841, Tom Marsden, who scored 227 for Sheffield & Leicester vs Nottingham in 1826, and George Ulyett, who represented the club in the first ever international test match before becoming one of only a select band of players who played for both sections of The Wednesday Club.

On the evening of Wednesday 4 September 1867, a meeting was held at the Adelphi Hotel to establish whether there was interest among the club's members to form a football club to keep the team together and fit during the winter months. The proposal proved very popular, with over 60 members signing up for the new team on the first night. They played their first match against The Mechanics on 19 October the same year, winning by three goals and four 'rouges' to nil.

It soon became apparent that football would come to eclipse the cricketing side of the club in terms of popularity—the two sections went their separate ways in 1882 after a dispute over finances and the cricket club ceased to exist in 1925. On 1 February 1868, Wednesday played their first competitive football match as they entered the Cromwell Cup, a one-off four-team competition for newly formed clubs. A week after their semi-final, they went on to win the cup, beating the Garrick club in the final after extra time, the only goal being scored in diminishing light at Bramall Lane. This was one of the first recorded instances of a match being settled by a "golden goal" although the term was not in use at the time.

A key figure during the formative years of the football club was Charles Clegg, who joined the Wednesday in 1867. His relationship with the club lasted for the rest of his life and eventually led to his becoming the club's chairman. He also became president and chairman of the Football Association, and was known as the "Napoleon of Football". Clegg played for England in the first-ever international match, against Scotland in November 1872. This completed a unique double for the club, who could lay claim to having a player in the first international games of both cricket and football.

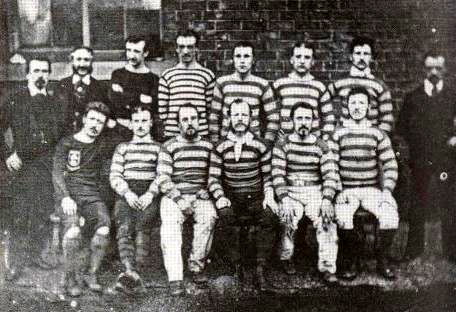
The Wednesday team in 1878

In 1876 Wednesday acquired Scot James Lang. Although he was not employed by the club, he was given a job by a member of the Sheffield Wednesday board that had no formal duties. He is now acknowledged as the first professional football player in England. With Lang in their team the football club became one of the strongest in the region, a reputation that was cemented when they won the inaugural Sheffield FA Challenge Cup in 1877.

In 1880 the club entered the FA Cup for the first time, and they soon became one of the most respected sides in the country. But although they had had Lang on their books a decade earlier, the club officially remained staunchly amateur, and this stance almost cost the club its very existence. By the middle of the decade, Wednesday's best players were leaving in their droves to join clubs who would pay them, and in January 1887 they lost 0–16 against Halliwell with just 10 players in their team. An emergency meeting was held, and the board members finally agreed to pay its players.

=== Professional football, English Champions and FA Cup winners (1889–1939) ===
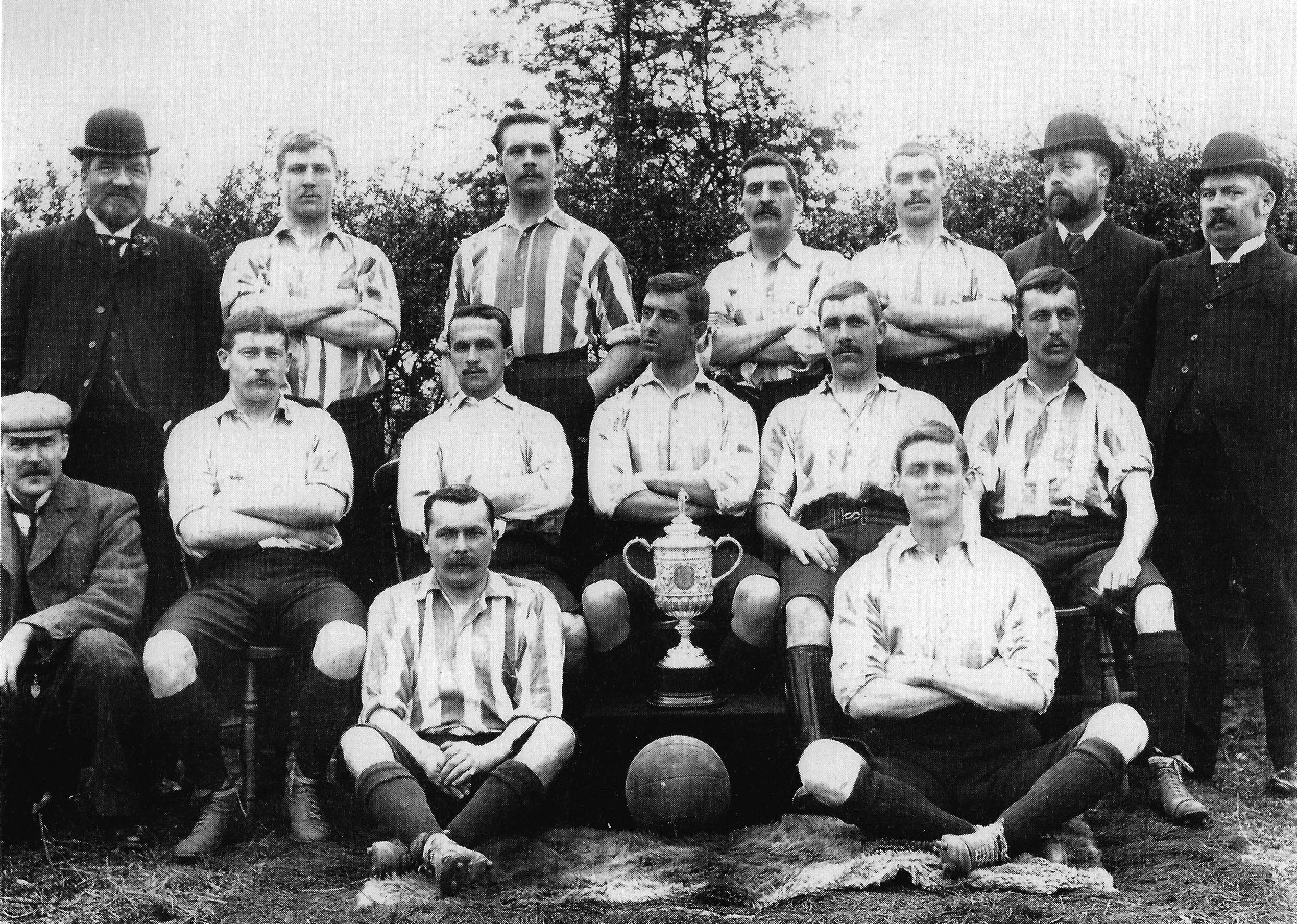
Sheffield Wednesday players posing with the FA Cup won in 1896

The move to professionalism took the club from Bramall Lane, which had taken a share of the ticket revenue, to the new Olive Grove. In 1889 the club became founder members of the Football Alliance, of which they were the first champions in a season where they also reached the 1890 FA Cup final, losing 6–1 to Blackburn Rovers at Kennington Oval, London. Despite finishing the following season bottom of the Alliance, they were eventually elected to the expanded Football League in 1892. They won the FA Cup for the first time in 1896, beating Wolverhampton Wanderers 2–1 at Crystal Palace.

Owing to an expansion of the local railway lines, the club was told that they would have to find a new ground for the 1899–1900 season. After a difficult search the club finally bought some land in the village of Owlerton, which at the time was several miles outside the Sheffield city boundaries. Construction of a new stadium (now known as Hillsborough Stadium) was completed within months and the club was secured for the next century. In a strong decade, Wednesday won the League in the 1902–03 and 1903–04 seasons and the FA Cup again in 1907, beating Everton 2–1, again at Crystal Palace. When competitive football was suspended in 1915 because of the outbreak of World War I, the club participated in several regionalised war leagues, until 1919, when competitive football resumed.

They were relegated from the top flight for the first time in 1920, and did not return until 1926, and in the 1927–28 season they looked like going down again before securing a haul of 17 points from their last 10 matches to secure safety. Wednesday went on to win the League title the following season (1928–29), which started a run that saw the team finishing lower than third only once until 1936. The period was topped off with the team winning the FA Cup for the third time in the club's history in 1935. When World War II began, the club entered non-competitive war leagues, returning to competitive football in 1946.

=== The yo-yo years (1945–1959) ===
Chart of Sheffield Wednesday's Performances

The 1950s saw Wednesday unable to consistently hold on to a position in the top flight and this period became known as the yo-yo years. After being promoted in 1950 they were relegated three times, although each time they returned to the top flight by winning the Second Division the following season. The decade ended on a high note with the team finishing in the top half of the First Division for the first time since World War II.

=== Back in the top flight and title contenders (1959–1970) ===
In 1961, the club ran toe-to-toe with Tottenham Hotspur at the top of the table for the majority of the season – Wednesday became the first team to beat Spurs all season – before finally finishing in second place, which still (as of 2023) remains the club's highest post-war league finish. In 1966 the club reached its fifth FA Cup final, but they were beaten 3–2 by Everton, having led 2–0.

Off the field the club was embroiled in the British betting scandal of 1964 in which three of its players, Peter Swan, David Layne and Tony Kay, were accused of match fixing and betting against their own team in an away game at Ipswich Town. The three were subsequently convicted and, on release from prison, banned from football for life. The three were reprieved in the early 1970s, with Swan and Layne returning to Hillsborough, and, though their careers were virtually over, Swan at least played some league games for The Owls.

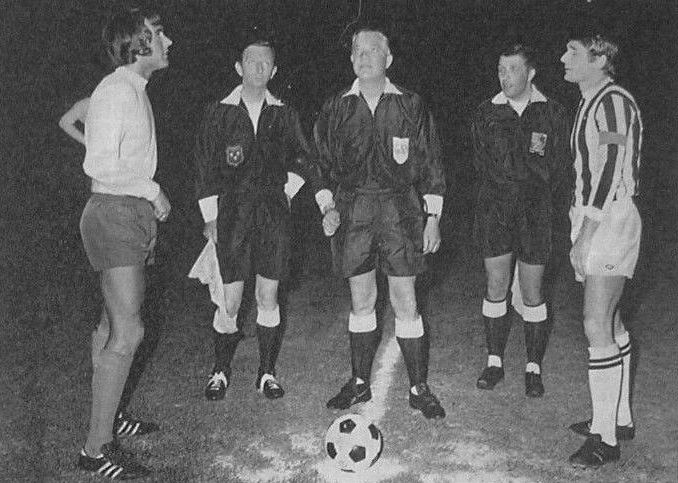
The coin toss before the away game in Turin versus Juventus for the 1970 Anglo-Italian Cup

=== Darkest days and the fight back to the top (1970–1984) ===
Wednesday were relegated at the end of the 1969–70 season; this began the darkest period in the club's history, eventually culminating in the club dropping to the Third Division for the first time in its history, and in 1976 it almost fell into the Fourth Division. It was not until the appointment of Jack Charlton as manager in 1977 that the club started to climb back up the league pyramid. Charlton led the Owls back to the Second Division in 1980 before handing the reins to Howard Wilkinson, who took the club back into the top flight in 1984, after an absence of 14 years.

=== Life at the top of the Premier League and European Football (1984–2000) ===
Wednesday enjoyed success in its return to the top flight, finishing 8th in their first season back and then 5th the season later, qualifying for European football only to be disqualified due to England's ban in Europe due to the Heysel Stadium disaster.

On 15 April 1989 the club's stadium was the scene of one of the worst sporting tragedies ever, at the FA Cup semi-final between Liverpool and Nottingham Forest, at which 97 Liverpool fans were fatally crushed in the Leppings Lane end of the stadium. The tragedy resulted in many changes at Hillsborough and all other leading stadiums in England; it was required that terracing would be replaced with seats in stands, and that perimeter fencing should be removed.

In Ron Atkinson's first full season as manager, 1989–90, Sheffield Wednesday finished 18th in the First Division and were relegated on goal difference, despite the acquisition of the talented John Sheridan and the fact they had pulled towards mid-table at one stage of the season. They regained promotion at the first attempt but the real highlight of the season was a League Cup final victory over Atkinson's old club Manchester United. Midfielder Sheridan scored the only goal of the game, which delivered the club's first major trophy since their FA Cup success in 1935. As of 2025 they remain the last team to win one of English football's major trophies while outside the top flight. Atkinson moved to Aston Villa shortly after promotion was achieved, and handed over the reins to 37-year-old striker Trevor Francis.

Wednesday finished third in the First Division at the end of the 1991–92 season, booking their place in the following season's UEFA Cup and becoming a founding member of the new FA Premier League.

1992–93 was one of the most eventful seasons in the history of Sheffield Wednesday football club. They finished seventh in the Premier League and reached the finals of both the FA Cup and the League Cup, but were on the losing side to Arsenal in both games, the FA Cup final going to a replay and only settled in the last minute of extra time. This prevented the Owls from making another appearance in European competition. Still, the 1992–93 season established Sheffield Wednesday as a top club. Midfielder Chris Waddle was voted Football Writers' Association Footballer of the Year, and the strike partnership of David Hirst and Mark Bright was one of the most feared in the country. Francis was unable to achieve any more success at the club, and two seasons later he was sacked. His successor was former Luton, Leicester and Tottenham manager David Pleat.

David Pleat's first season as Sheffield Wednesday manager was frustrating, as they finished 15th in the Premiership despite an expensively-assembled line-up which included the likes of Marc Degryse, Dejan Stefanovic and Darko Kovacevic – who all had disappointing and short-lived tenures at the club. An excellent start to the 1996–97 season saw the Owls top the Premiership after winning their first four games, and David Pleat was credited Manager of the Month for August 1996. But the club failed to mount a serious title challenge and they faded away to finish seventh in the final table. Pleat was sacked the following November with the club struggling at the wrong end of the Premiership, and Ron Atkinson briefly returned to steer the Owls clear of relegation.

At the end of the 1997–98 season, Ron Atkinson's short-term contract was not renewed and Sheffield Wednesday turned to the Barnsley boss Danny Wilson as their new manager, after being rejected by both Gerard Houllier and Walter Smith who joined Liverpool and Everton respectively. Wilson's first season at the helm brought a slight improvement as they finished 12th in the Premiership.

=== Modern highs and lows (2000–2014) ===
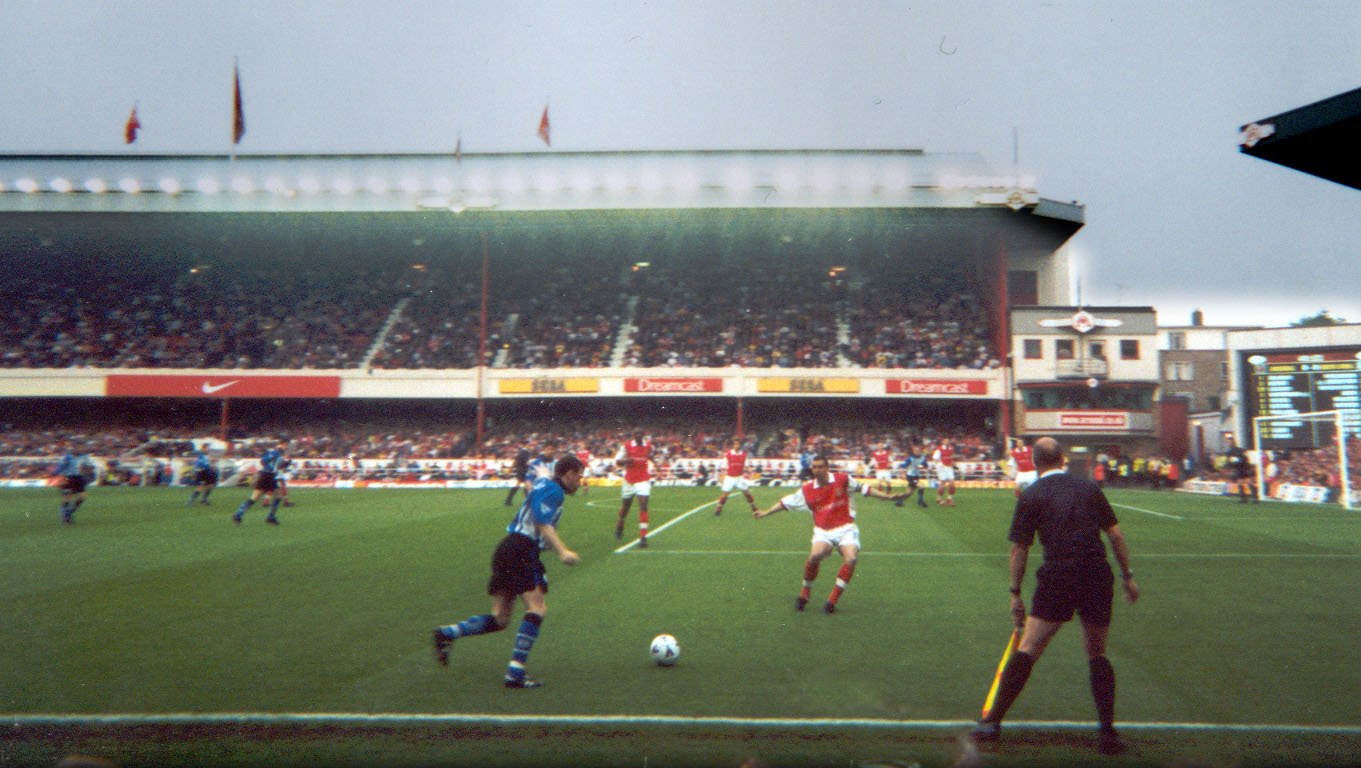
The Owls playing in their final away match of the 1999–2000 Premier League season, at Arsenal in May 2000

An expensively assembled squad including Paolo Di Canio, Benito Carbone and Wim Jonk failed to live up to the massive wage bill the club was paying and things eventually came to a head when Italian firebrand Di Canio was sent off in a match against Arsenal and proceeded to push the referee on his way off. Danny Wilson was sacked the following March with relegation looking a certainty for the Hillsborough club, following a disastrous 1999–2000 season where they had been hammered 8–0 by Newcastle United as early as September. His assistant Peter Shreeves took temporary charge but was unable to stave off relegation, with a 3–3 draw at Arsenal in May 2000 being enough to see the Owls tumble into the First Division.

Having spent large sums building squads that were ultimately ineffective, the club's finances took a turn for the worse, and in 2003 they were relegated for a second time in four years, to the Second Division.

The club spent two years in the third tier before returning the Championship, Paul Sturrock's side won the 2005 play-off final by defeating Hartlepool United 4–2 after extra time at the Millennium Stadium. Ultimately however, the club's perilous financial position ensured another drop to League One was not too far away – five years after the play-off win of 2005, the Owls were again relegated to League One.

Between July and November 2010, Sheffield Wednesday faced a series of winding up orders for unpaid tax and VAT bills, with the club's existence under severe threat. It was not until 29 November 2010, when businessman Milan Mandarić agreed to buy out the old owners, that the club could move forward.

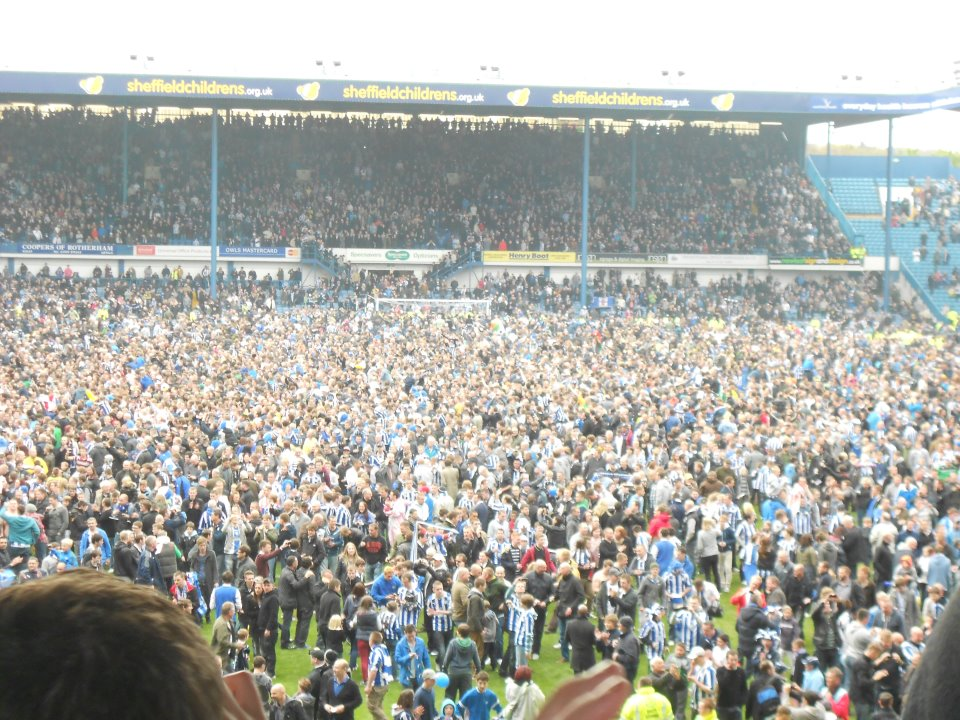
Wednesday supporters celebrating on the pitch, following promotion to The Championship, on 5 May 2012

Mandarić appointed former Wednesday player Gary Megson as manager partway through the 2010–11 season, and while Megson only stayed in the job for a year, what was mostly his side won promotion back to the Championship in May 2012, under the stewardship of new manager Dave Jones.

=== The Chansiri era (2014–2025) ===
In 2014, the club was, once again, taken over by a new owner, Thai businessman Dejphon Chansiri, purchasing the club from Milan Mandarić for £37.5m. Chansiri stated his intention to win Premier League promotion for the 2017–18 season – the football club's 150th anniversary – and came close to achieving that goal a year ahead of schedule, with new coach Carlos Carvalhal leading the club into the end of season play-offs at the end of the 2015–16 season. Wednesday were beaten in the final by Hull City at Wembley. They made the play-offs again the following season, but lost on penalties to the eventually promoted Huddersfield Town in the semi-final.

The club were favourites to be promoted in the 2017–18 season, but injuries and poor results saw them drop to the lower half of the table. Carvalhal left by mutual consent in December 2017, and was replaced by Dutch manager Jos Luhukay a month later. The team finished in an uneventful 15th place at the end of the season. Luhukay was sacked in December 2018 after a run of only one win in 10, which left the team 18th in the table. He was replaced by former Aston Villa boss Steve Bruce who saw an upturn in form to finish 12th. However, Bruce controversially resigned in July 2019 to manage Newcastle United.

On 6 September 2019, the club appointed former Birmingham City manager Garry Monk as the new manager, who achieved a 16th-place finish in a season that was interrupted from March to June by the COVID-19 pandemic. On 31 July 2020, Sheffield Wednesday were found guilty of breaking EFL spending rules and began the 2020–21 season on −12 points, though the deficit was later reduced to −6 upon appeal. On 9 November 2020, Monk was sacked after a poor start to the season and was replaced by Tony Pulis. However, Pulis was also dismissed after only 45 days in charge on 28 December 2020. After a few months with Neil Thompson as caretaker manager, Darren Moore was appointed as the club's third permanent manager of the season in March 2021. Despite taking the fight to the final day, Moore could not prevent relegation to League One come the end of the season, bringing Wednesday's nine-year spell in the Championship to an end.

After failing to win promotion in their first season back in League One, Wednesday finished third in the 2022–23 season. In the play-off semi-finals, Wednesday lost 4–0 in the first leg against Peterborough United but won the second leg 5–1 before prevailing on penalties. Wednesday then won promotion back to the Championship by defeating Barnsley in the 2023 play-off final. Moore departed from the club on 19 June by mutual consent.

Moore was replaced by Xisco Muñoz, however, he was sacked after 12 games with the club winless during his tenure. Early in the season, following fan protests, owner Chansiri said he would put no more money into the club, unhappy with fans' treatment towards him and his family. On 31 October 2023, Chansiri, citing cashflow problems, asked Wednesday fans to raise £2m by 10 November 2023 to help the club pay an outstanding HMRC debt and cover wages. Danny Röhl was announced as Munoz's successor and oversaw a revival on form, eventually confirming safety from relegation on the final day of the season.

The club's midtable finish in the 2024–25 season was marred by further financial difficulties. The club were again placed under a registration embargo for failure to pay HMRC for the second year in a row. In March 2025, Chansiri issued a statement that the players hadn't been paid for the month of March due to cashflow problems. May, June and July 2025 payments to players were similarly delayed, and Wednesday were placed under an EFL registration embargo, and the club and Chansiri faced EFL charges relating to payment obligations. The club was also barred from carrying out any transfers or loans involving a fee in the summer 2025 window and the two 2026 transfer windows.

On 29 July 2025, ahead of the 2025–26 season, Röhl left the club (his assistant Henrik Pedersen succeeded him), and the North Stand at Hillsborough was temporarily closed by the city council due to "extensive corrosion" in the roof. On 1 August 2025, the EFL was reported to be increasingly concerned about the club's future and its ability to fulfil their Championship fixtures; defender Max Lowe decided to leave the club, while other senior players were said to be considering doing the same. A pre-season training game against Burnley on 2 August was cancelled, and players considered going on strike as the uncertainty continued. On 10 August 2025, the side's opening Championship fixture at Leicester City, which Wednesday lost 2–1, saw further protests against Chansiri's ownership of the club. Club debts had been settled on 8 August, using a solidarity payment from the Premier League, allowing Pedersen to start making additions to a squad with only 12 senior players ahead of the season's first league fixture at Hillsborough against Stoke City. On 4 October 2025, second-bottom Wednesday were humbled 5–0 at Hillsborough by Coventry City in a game interrupted by fans entering the pitch to protest against Chansiri's ownership after wages were not paid on time for the fifth time in seven months.

=== Administration, relegation and sale (2025–) ===
On 24 October 2025 the club went into administration ahead of a winding-up petition being filed against the club by HM Revenue and Customs. Administrators from financial advisory firm Begbies Traynor were appointed to run the club, ending Chansiri's involvement with Wednesday. The club was immediately docked 12 points by the Football League leaving the club bottom of the Championship on minus-six points. A further six points deduction for regulation breaches was announced on 1 December 2025, leaving the club on minus 10 points, 27 points from safety. On 24 December, the administrators confirmed that they intended to grant preferred bidder status to a consortium following the initial bidding process, which the BBC reported as a James Bord-led consortium. The preferred bidder funded the club's operating losses during the exclusivity period, helping ensure the club had sufficient money for the remainder of the season.

On 3 February 2026, Wednesday were 39 points from safety and on a club record run of 23 league matches without a win. Defeats at Blackburn Rovers (1–0) and Swansea City (4–0) set a record of nine straight league games without scoring. Wednesday ended their goal-less streak by scoring against Millwall on 14 February, but lost 2–1. Wednesday then lost the Steel City derby at Bramall Lane on 22 February; Sheffield United's 2–1 win condemned the Owls to the earliest relegation in EFL history.

Three days later, the Bord consortium pulled out of its takeover of Sheffield Wednesday, leaving the administrators seeking another buyer. Three bidders were reported to be vying to buy the club: Mike Ashley, Charlie Methven and David Storch, and Storch's Arise Capital Partners become the new preferred bidder. Wednesday could start the 2026–27 season with a 15-point deduction as Arise's offer fails an EFL requirement to repay creditors 25p in the pound – a step criticised by the club's supporters' trust as "excessive and punitive" and a potential deterrent to Arise's takeover.

Three further defeats extended the club's winless run to 30 games, and made it 13 successive league defeats (a Championship record). A 1–1 draw against Watford on 10 March 2026 ended the losing streak, but three more defeats and three draws then meant the Owls set a new EFL record of 37 consecutive league matches without a win. Defeats at Middlesbrough and Oxford United extended the run to 39 games.

On 2 May 2026, Arise Capital Partners LLC completed its acquisition of the club, ending the 175-day period of administration. The EFL also waived the 15-points deduction the Owls were due to receive for the 2026–27 season in light of the takeover and Chansiri's refusal to co-operate during the club's sale. Later the same day, Wednesday beat West Bromwich Albion 2–1, their first home win in over a year and their second win overall in the season, and ending their winless streak. Wednesday finished the season on zero points, avoiding becoming the first team in EFL history to finish a season with a negative number of points.

== Nickname, kits, crest and traditions ==
=== Nickname ===
In their early years, the club was nicknamed The Blades, a term used for any sporting team from the city of Sheffield, famous the world over for its cutlery and knives. That nickname has been retained by Wednesday's crosstown rivals, Sheffield United.

Although it is widely assumed that the club's nickname changed to The Owls in 1899 after the club's move to Owlerton, it was not until 1912, when Wednesday player George Robertson presented the club with an owl mascot, that the name took hold. A monkey mascot introduced some years earlier had not brought much luck.

=== Kits ===
The Wednesday's home shirt of 1871. It is assumed that these were the original colours used by the team.

Since its founding the club has played their home games in blue and white shirts, traditionally in vertical stripes. However, this has not always been the case and there have been variations upon the theme. A monochrome photograph from 1874 to 1875 shows the Wednesday team in plain dark shirts, while the 1871 "Rules of the Sheffield Football Association" listed the Wednesday club colours as blue and white hoops. A quartered blue and white design was used in 1887 and a blue shirt with white sleeves between 1965 and 1973. Wednesday's socks have been predominantly black, blue or white throughout their history.

The club's away strip has changed regularly over the years. Traditionally, white was the second choice for many teams, including Wednesday, although the club has used a multitude of colours for its change strip over the years, including yellow, black, silver, green and orange.

=== Crest ===
Since 1912, the owl has become a theme that has run throughout the club. The original club crest was introduced in 1956 and consisted of a shield showing a traditionally drawn owl perched on a branch. The White Rose of York was depicted below the branch alluding to the home county of Yorkshire and the sheaves of Sheffield (Sheaf field) were shown at either side of the owl's head. The club's Latin motto, Consilio et Animis, was displayed beneath the shield. This translates into English as "By Wisdom and Courage".

The crest was changed in 1970 to a minimalist version designed by a local art student, Robert Walker, and this logo was used by the club, with variations, until 1995, when it was replaced by a similar design to the original crest. It again featured a traditionally drawn owl perched on a branch although the design of both had changed. The sheaves were replaced by a stylised SWFC logo that had been in use on club merchandise for several years prior to the introduction of the new crest. The Yorkshire Rose was moved to above the owl's head to make way for the words Sheffield Wednesday. The word Hillsborough was also curved around the top of the design. The club motto was absent on the new design. The crest was encased in a new shape of shield. This crest remained in use for only a few years, during which several versions were used with different colours, including a white crest with blue stripes down either side and the colouring of the detail inverted.

In 1999, the minimalist version was brought back, albeit inside a crest, and with the addition of a copyright symbol in 2002. In 2016, new owner Dejphon Chansiri again changed the club crest, opting for a similar design to the 1956 badge. Following the April 2026 change of ownership, new chairman David Storch started a consultation about reintroducing the minimalist version of the Owl badge, with the change ratified by the EFL in June 2026.

1956–1973

1973–1995

1995–1999

1999–2016

2016–2026

2026–

=== Mascots ===
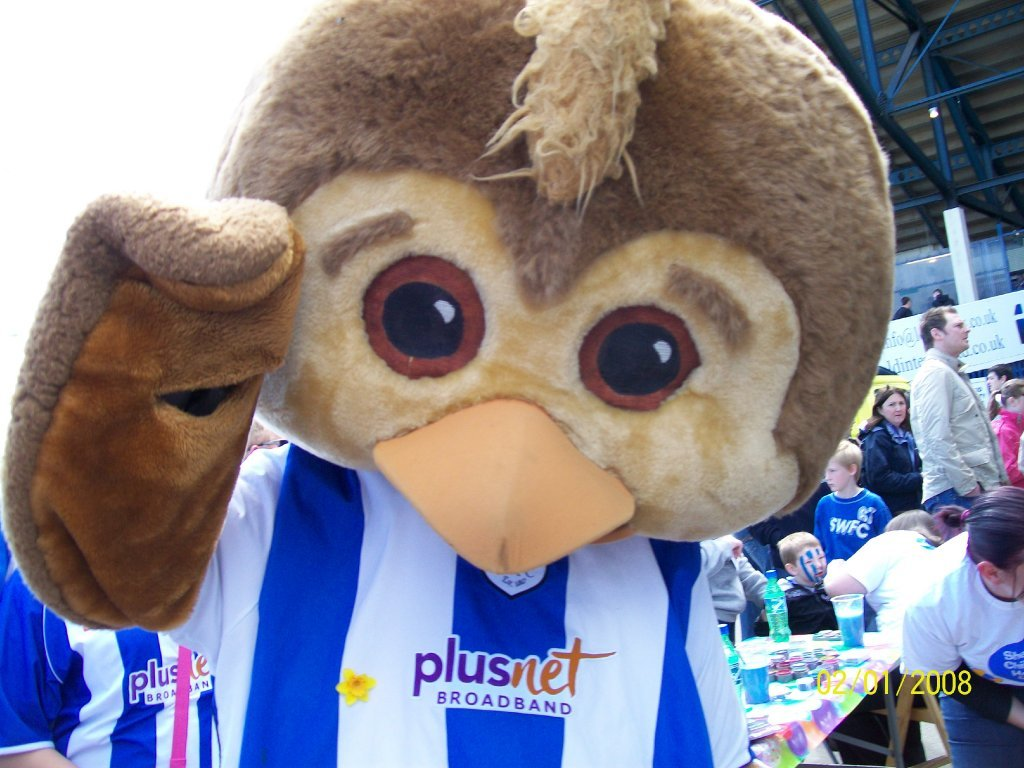
Ozzie Owl, the primary club mascot

Over the years Sheffield Wednesday have had several Owl-themed matchday mascots. Originally it was Ozzie the Owl and later two further Owls, Baz & Ollie, were added. All three were replaced in 2006 by Barney Owl. Ozzie Owl was reintroduced as Wednesday's main mascot during the home game with Charlton Athletic on 17 January 2009. The current mascots are Ozzie and Barney Owl. In 2012, Ollie Owl also made his return to the scene, as the club announced him Mascot for the Owls work with children in the local community.

== Stadium ==
=== Past stadiums ===
Originally, Wednesday played matches at Highfield, but moved several times before adopting a permanent ground. Other locations included Myrtle Road, Heeley and Hunter's Bar. Major matches were played at Sheaf House or Bramall Lane, before Sheffield United made it their home ground. Sheffield Wednesday's first permanent home ground was at Olive Grove, a site near Queen's Road originally leased from the Duke of Norfolk. The first game at Olive Grove was a 4–4 draw with Blackburn Rovers on 12 September 1887. Extensions to the adjacent railway forced the club to move to their current ground in 1899.

=== Hillsborough Stadium ===
Since 1899 Wednesday have played their home games at Hillsborough Stadium in the Owlerton district of Sheffield. The stadium was originally named Owlerton Stadium but in 1914 Owlerton became part of the parliamentary constituency of Hillsborough and the ground took on its current name. With 39,732 seats, Hillsborough has the 12th highest capacity in England. The club had intended to increase Hillsborough's capacity to 44,825 by 2012 and 50,000 by 2016 and make several other improvements in the process, but due to England's failed World Cup bid, this is now not the case.

The stadium has hosted World Cup football in 1966, the 1996 European Championships and 27 FA Cup semi-finals. The Kop at Hillsborough was re-opened in 1986 by Queen Elizabeth II and was once the largest covered stand of any football stadium in Europe.

On 15 April 1989, at an FA Cup semi-final between Liverpool and Nottingham Forest, 94 Liverpool fans (later increasing to 97) were crushed to death after the terraces at the Leppings Lane end of the ground became overcrowded, in what became known as the Hillsborough disaster. The following report concluded that the root cause of the disaster was the failure of local police to adequately manage the crowds. A memorial to the victims of the disaster stands outside Hillsborough's South Stand, near the main entrance on Parkside Road. After many years of dispute about the facts, in June 2017 six men responsible for safety were charged with criminal offences including manslaughter and misconduct in public office.

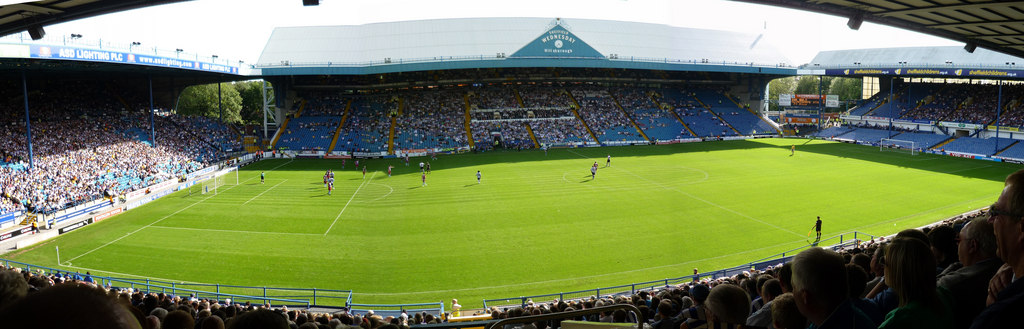
Panorama of Hillsborough Stadium in 2009

== Supporters ==
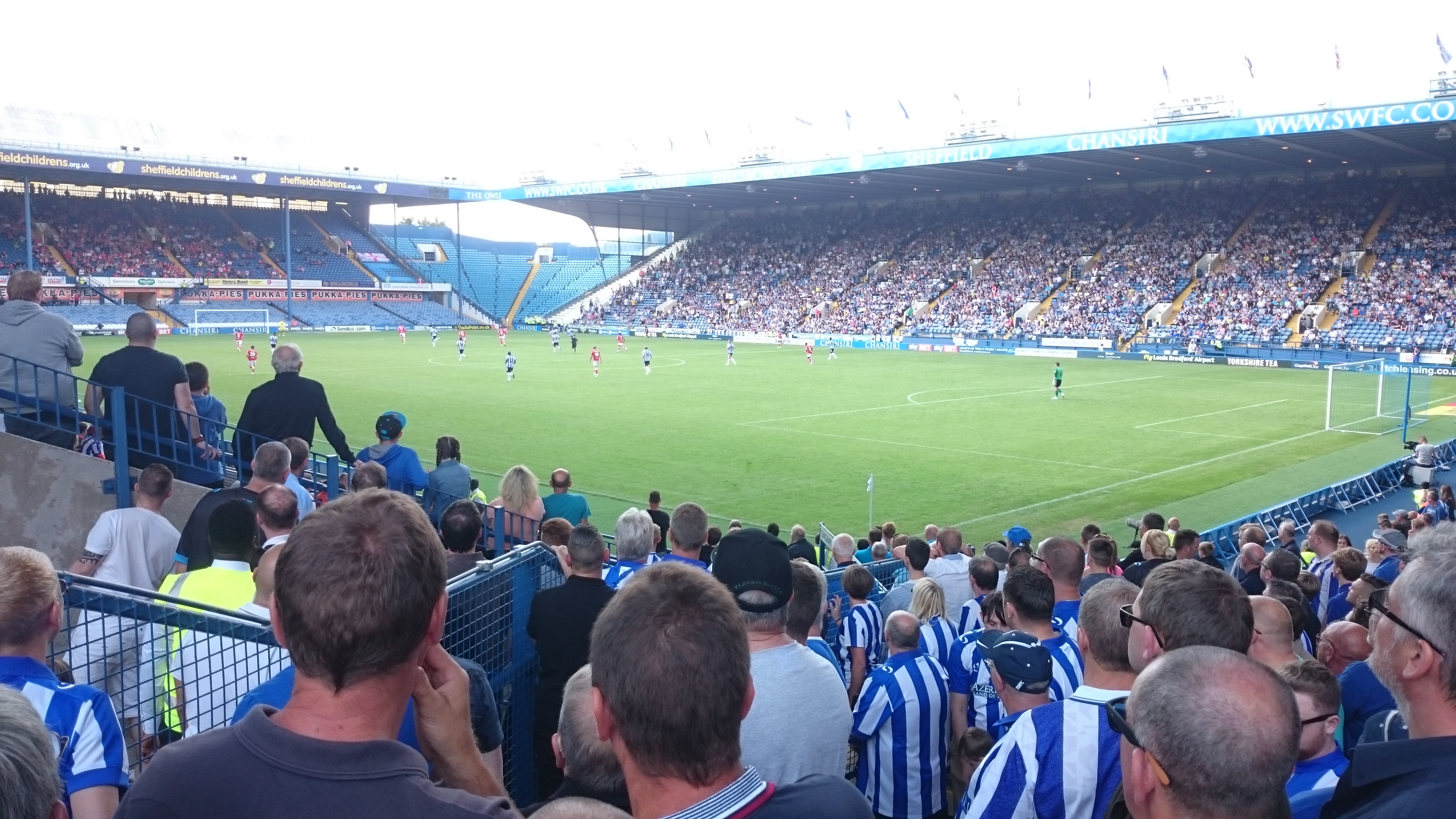
Wednesday fans at Hillsborough in 2015

The club's move to Owlerton in 1899 was a risky one, as it moved the club several miles away from the city centre, but its loyal followers continued to make the journey to the new ground, and the club has been one of the best supported in England ever since. However, official attendances were not taken at Football League games until the 1920s.

The club's highest average attendance over the course of a season was 42,530 in 1952–53, when gates across the country were at their highest. The lowest average attendance in the Owls' history came in 1978–79, when an average of just 10,643 fans turned out to watch their side.

In 1992, Wednesday were the fourth best supported team in the country, but although that ranking has come down since relegation from the Premier League in 2000, the club still has still enjoyed crowds of well over 20,000 since then, and was the best supported club outside the top flight in 2006.

At the 2005 play-off final, Wednesday took over 39,000 fans to the Millennium Stadium. In 2016, Sheffield Wednesday took over 38,000 fans to Wembley for a play-off final defeat by Hull City. The Owls have managed to average 30,000 at home in the last 60 years. The FA Cup final seasons in 1965–66 30000 and 1966–67 31,000 plus 32,000 when coming League Championship runners-up in 1960–61.

Sheffield Wednesday have had a large variety of fanzines over the years; examples include Just Another Wednesday, Out of the Blue, Spitting Feathers, Boddle, A View From The East Bank, Cheat! and War of the Monster Trucks, which acquired its name from the programme that Yorkshire Television elected to show instead of the celebrations after the 1991 League Cup victory over Manchester United.

There are several online message boards dedicated to discussions on the club, including Owlstalk, OwlsOnline and OwlsMad.

== Rivalry ==
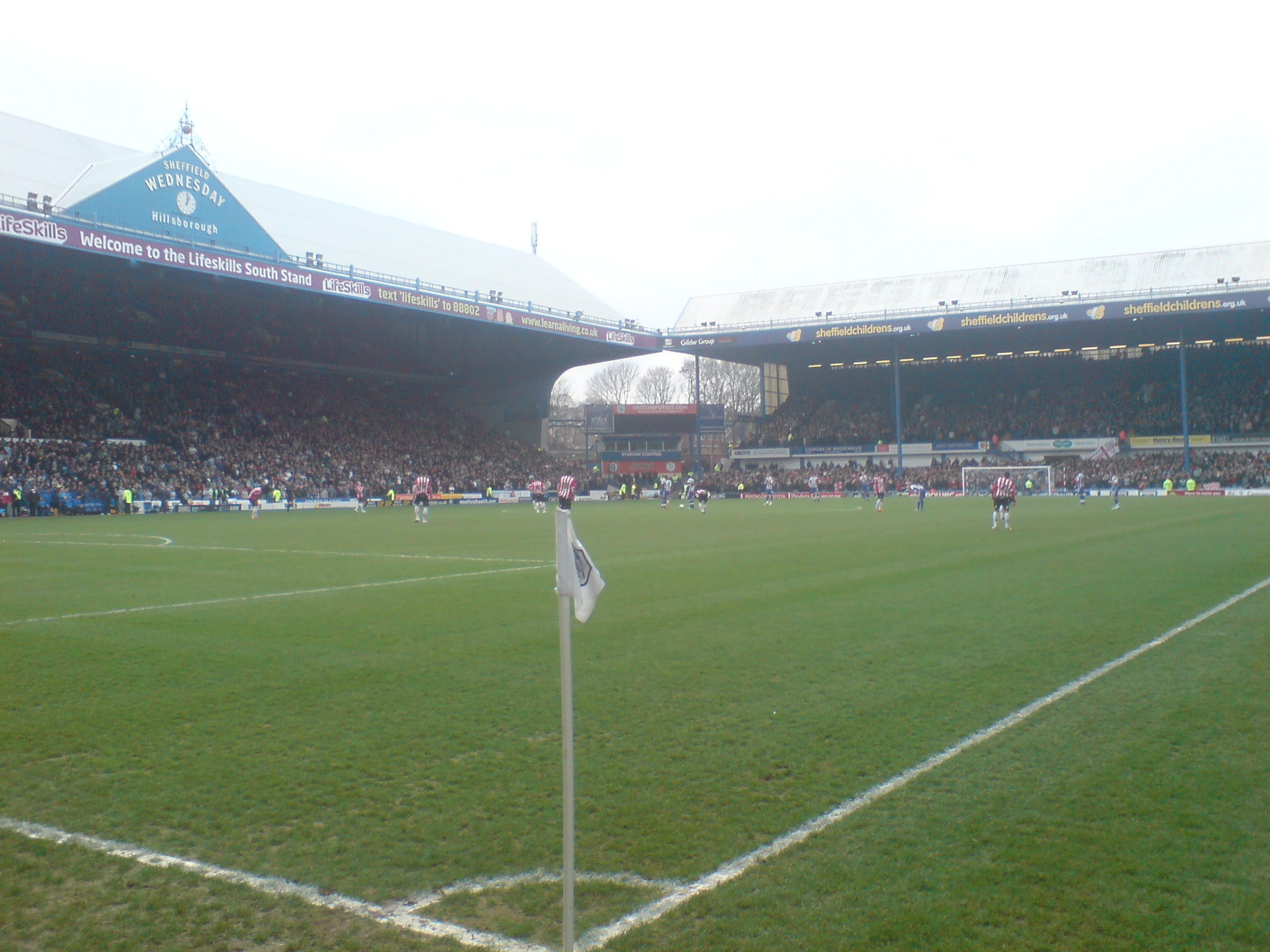
Wednesday vs United just before the 2012 league fixture at Hillsborough. Wednesday won 1–0 and went on to pip their rivals to promotion

Sheffield Wednesday's main rivals are city neighbours Sheffield United. Matches between these two clubs are nicknamed Steel City derbies, so called because of the steel industry for which the city is famous.

United were formed in 1889 by the committee at Bramall Lane, who had lost their biggest source of income – Wednesday – two years earlier over a dispute concerning pitch rent. As well as playing at Wednesday's former ground, United also took Wednesday's former nickname, the Blades, as their own. The first derby game took place on 15 December 1890, with Wednesday winning 2–1 at Olive Grove.

The 1993 FA Cup semi-final match which took place at Wembley on 3 April 1993. Initially, it was announced that the match was scheduled to take place at Elland Road but this was met with dismay by both sets of fans. After a re-think, the Football Association decided to switch venue to Wembley. A crowd of 75,365 supporters made the trip to London to watch Wednesday beat United 2–1 after extra time.

A survey conducted in 2019 revealed that, as well as Sheffield United, Wednesday fans consider fellow-Yorkshire sides Leeds United, Barnsley, Rotherham United and Doncaster Rovers as rivals.

== European record ==
Season	Competition	Round	Opponent	Home	Away	Aggregate
1961–62	Inter-Cities Fairs Cup (UEFA Europa League)	Last 32	(France) Lyon	5–2	2–4	7–6
1961–62	Inter-Cities Fairs Cup (UEFA Europa League)	Last 16	(Italy) Roma	4–0	0–1	4–1
1961–62	Inter-Cities Fairs Cup (UEFA Europa League)	Quarter-final	(Spain) Barcelona	3–2	0–2	3–4
1963–64	Inter-Cities Fairs Cup (UEFA Europa League)	First round	(Netherlands) DOS	4–1	4–1	8–2
1963–64	Inter-Cities Fairs Cup (UEFA Europa League)	Second round	(Germany) Köln	1–2	2–3	3–5
1986–87	UEFA Cup (UEFA Europa League)	As 5th place in First Division/Premier League. English clubs banned from competition (See Heysel Stadium disaster)				
1991–92	UEFA Cup (UEFA Europa League)	League Cup Winners. English clubs re-admitted to competition but due to lost coeffecient ratings of English clubs due to ban only one team qualified. (See Heysel Stadium disaster)				
1992–93	UEFA Cup (UEFA Europa League)	First round	Spora Luxembourg	8–1	2–1	10–2
1992–93	UEFA Cup (UEFA Europa League)	Second round	(Germany) Kaiserslautern	2–2	1–3	3–5
1995–96	UEFA Intertoto Cup	Group stage	(Switzerland) FC Basel	—N/a	0–1	—N/a
1995–96	UEFA Intertoto Cup	Group stage	(Poland) Górnik Zabrze	3–2	—N/a	—N/a
1995–96	UEFA Intertoto Cup	Group stage	(Germany) Karlsruher SC	—N/a	1–1	—N/a
1995–96	UEFA Intertoto Cup	Group stage	(Denmark) AGF Aarhus	3–1	—N/a	—N/a

== Former players and managers ==
=== Former players ===
A list of former players can be found at List of Sheffield Wednesday F.C. players.

=== Notable managers ===
Only managers with over 200 games in charge are included. For the complete list see List of Sheffield Wednesday F.C. managers.

Name	Nat	From	To	Record				
Name	Nat	From	To	P	W	L	D	Win%
Arthur Dickinson	(England)	1 August 1891	31 May 1920	919	393	338	188	42.27%
Robert Brown	(England)	1 June 1920	1 December 1933	600	266	199	135	44.33%
Eric Taylor	(England)	1 April 1942	31 July 1958	539	196	215	128	36.36%
Jack Charlton	(England)	8 October 1977	27 May 1983	269	105	77	87	39.03%
Howard Wilkinson	(England)	24 June 1983	10 October 1988	255	114	73	68	44.70%
Trevor Francis	(England)	7 June 1991	20 May 1995	214	88	58	68	41.12%

Dickinson, who was in charge for 29 years, is Wednesday's longest-serving manager, and helped establish the club during the first two decades of the 20th century.

Brown succeeded Dickinson and remained in charge for 13 years; in 1930 he secured their most recent top division league title to date.

Taylor took over during the Second World War and remained in charge until 1958, but failed to win a major trophy, even though Wednesday were in the top flight for most of his reign.

Charlton took Wednesday out of the Third Division in 1980 and in his final season (1982–83) he took them to the semi-finals of the FA Cup.

Wilkinson succeeded Charlton in the summer of 1983 and was in charge for more than five years before he moved to Leeds United. His first season saw Wednesday gain promotion to the First Division after a 14-year exile. He guided them to a fifth-place finish in 1986, but Wednesday were unable to compete in the 1986–87 UEFA Cup due to the ban on English teams in European competitions due to the Heysel Disaster of 1985.

Under Ron Atkinson, Wednesday won the League Cup and promotion to the First Division before departing for Aston Villa in July 1991. Trevor Francis was appointed as player-manager and guided them to third place in the league in 1992, and earned them a UEFA Cup place. They finished seventh in the inaugural Premier League season and were runners-up of the FA Cup and League Cup that year. He was sacked in 1995 after Wednesday finished 13th – their lowest standing in four years since winning promotion.

== Players ==
=== First team squad ===
As of 20 November 2026

Note: Flags indicate national team as defined under FIFA eligibility rules; some limited exceptions apply. Players may hold more than one non-FIFA nationality.

No.	Pos.	Nation	Player
1	GK	ENG	Joe Lumley
2	DF	SCO	Liam Palmer (club-captain)
3	DF	ENG	Max Lowe
4	DF	CPV	Ricardo Santos
5	DF	JAM	Di'Shon Bernard
6	DF	SCO	Liam Cooper
7	DF	TUN	Yan Valery
8	MF	ENG	Callum Slattery
9	FW	JAM	Jamal Lowe
10	MF	SCO	Barry Bannan (vice-captain)
11	FW	ENG	Louie Barry
12	FW	IRQ	Ali Al-Hamadi (on loan from Ipswich Town)
13	GK	AUS	Ashley Maynard-Brewer
14	MF	ZIM	Sean Fusire
16	MF	ENG	Billy Mitchell
18	MF	ENG	Jaden Heskey (on loan from Manchester City)

No.	Pos.	Nation	Player
19	FW	WAL	Will Grainger
20	FW	NIR	Kieran Morrison (on loan from Liverpool)
21	MF	ENG	Tyler Onyango
22	DF	IRL	Gabriel Otegbayo
23	MF	BDI	Jordi Liongola
24	FW	ENG	Harry Gray (on loan from Leeds United)
26	DF	NED	Sil Swinkels
27	GK	ENG	Connal Trueman
29	FW	ENG	George Brown
30	DF	ENG	Ernie Weaver
33	DF	ENG	Reece James
35	GK	ENG	Jack Phillips
37	MF	ENG	Jarvis Thornton
48	FW	ENG	Mason Burstow (on loan from Hull City)
50	FW	ENG	Davis Keillor-Dunn (on loan from Wrexham)

==== Out on loan ====
Note: Flags indicate national team as defined under FIFA eligibility rules; some limited exceptions apply. Players may hold more than one non-FIFA nationality.

No.	Pos.	Nation	Player
17	FW	ENG	Charlie McNeill (on loan to Crewe Alexandra)
28	DF	ENG	Cole McGhee (on loan to Torquay United)
32	DF	ENG	Joe Emery (on loan to South Shields)

No.	Pos.	Nation	Player
40	FW	NIR	Devlan Moses (on loan to Buxton)
—	FW	CAN	Iké Ugbo (on loan to Apollon Limassol)

== First team staff ==
As of 5 November 2026

Role	Name
Sporting Director	(England) Simon Wilson
Manager	(England) Dave Challinor
Assistant Coaches	(England) Matt Hamshaw (England) Clint Hill (England) Antony Sweeney
Goalkeeper Coach	(England) Darryl Flahavan
Operations Lead	(England) Craig Chappell
Club Doctor	(England) Taaha Nadeem
Masseur	(England) Ben Parker
Head of Sports Science	(England) Rob Lee
Sports Scientist	(England) Chris Brealey
Strength and Conditioning Coach	(England) Ryan McMahon
Physiotherapist	(England) Dean Taylor (England) Paul Teather
Soft Tissue Therapist	(England) Dominic Millward
Performance Analyst	(England) Richard Stirrup
Assistant Analyst	(England) Ben Clough
Head Kitman	(England) Ash Holland
Kitman	(England) Liam Simpson

== Club officials ==
Owners:

As of 23 July 2026

- Arise Capital Partners LLC

Board:

- Chairman: David Storch
- CEO: David Bruce
- Directors: Michael Storch • Tom Costin

== Records and statistics ==
Historical league position since 1892–93

Wednesday's biggest recorded win was a 12–0 home victory over Halliwell in the first round of the FA Cup on 18 January 1891. The biggest league win was a 9–1 victory at home to Birmingham in the First Division on 13 December 1930. Wednesday's heaviest defeat was a 10–0 defeat at Aston Villa in a First Division match on 5 October 1912.

The most goals scored by the club in a season was the 106 scored in the 1958–59 season. The club accumulated their highest league points total in the 2022–23 season when they racked up 96 points. The highest home attendance was in the FA Cup fifth round on 17 February 1934. A total of 72,841 turned up to see a 2–2 draw with Manchester City. The most-capped Englishman to play for the club was goalkeeper Ron Springett, who won 33 caps while at Sheffield Wednesday. Springett also held the overall record for most-capped Sheffield Wednesday player until Nigel Worthington broke the record, eventually gaining a total of 50 caps for Northern Ireland whilst at the club.

The fastest sending off in British league football is held by Sheffield Wednesday goalkeeper Kevin Pressman – who was sent off after just 13 seconds for handling a shot from Wolverhampton Wanderers's Temuri Ketsbaia outside the area during the opening weekend of 2000. The fastest shot ever recorded in the Premier League was hit by David Hirst against Arsenal at Highbury in September 1996 – Hirst hit the bar with a shot clocked at 114 mph (183 km/h; 51 m/s).

== Honours ==
League

- First Division (level 1)
  - Champions: 1902–03, 1903–04, 1928–29, 1929–30
- Second Division (level 2)
  - Champions: 1899–1900, 1925–26, 1951–52, 1955–56, 1958–59
  - Runners-up: 1949–50, 1983–84
  - Promoted: 1990–91
- Third Division / League One (level 3)
  - Runners-up: 2011–12
  - Promoted: 1979–80
  - Play-off winners: 2005, 2023
- Football Alliance
  - Champions: 1889–90

Cup

- FA Cup
  - Winners: 1895–96, 1906–07, 1934–35
  - Runners-up: 1889–90, 1965–66, 1992–93
- Football League Cup
  - Winners: 1990–91
  - Runners-up: 1992–93
- FA Charity Shield
  - Winners: 1935
  - Runners-up: 1930
