= Henrik Pedersen (football manager) =

Danish football manager (born 1978)

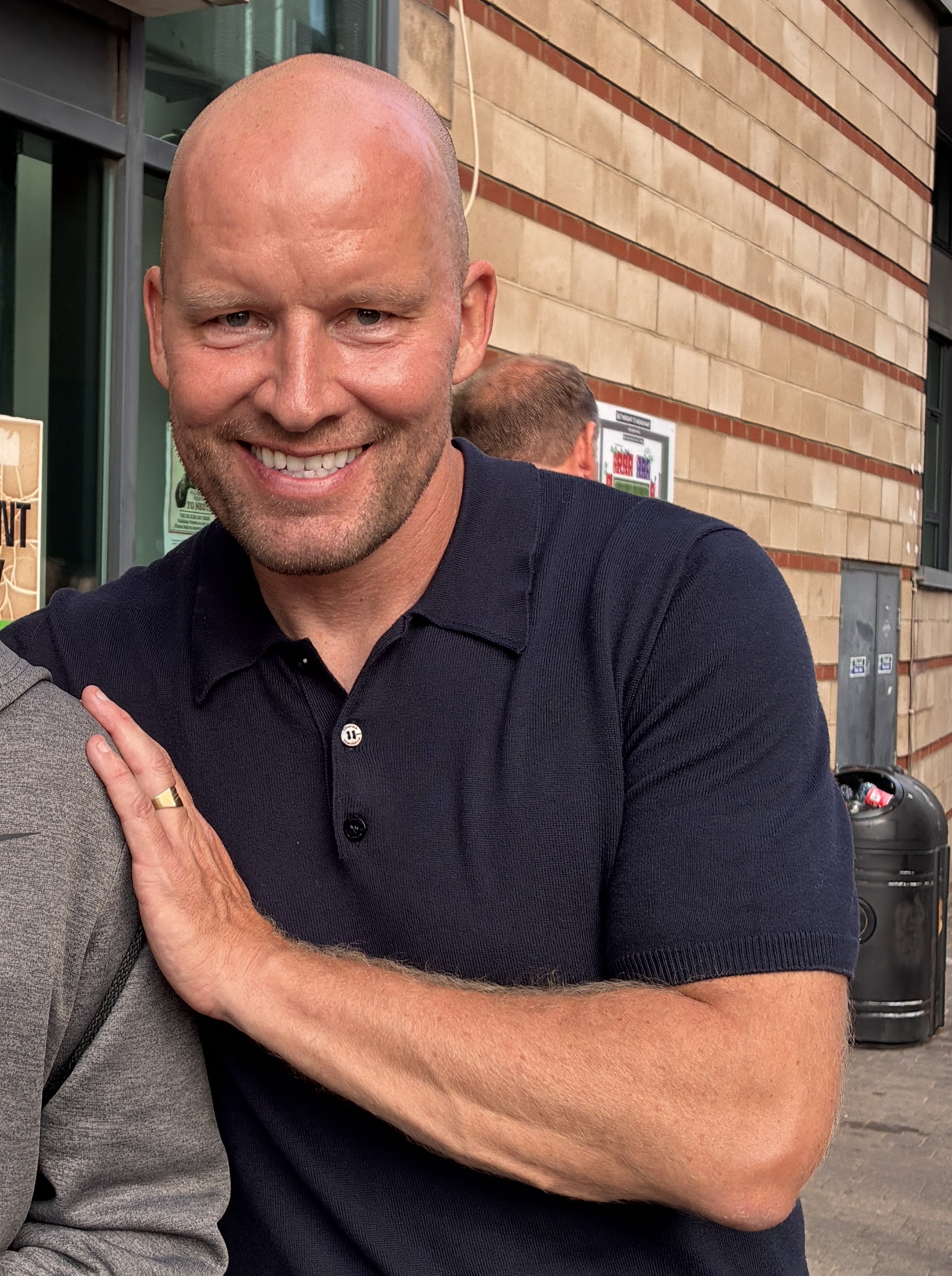
- Pedersen with Sheffield Wednesday in 2026

Personal information
- Date of birth: 2 January 1978 (age 48)
- Place of birth: Humlum, Denmark

Managerial career
- Years: Team
- 2010–2011: Red Bull Ghana
- 2014–2015: HB Køge
- 2018: Eintracht Braunschweig
- 2019–2021: Strømsgodset
- 2021–2023: Vendsyssel FF
- 2025–2026: Sheffield Wednesday

Henrik Pedersen (born 2 January 1978) is a Danish football manager who was most recently the head coach of EFL League One club Sheffield Wednesday.

== Career ==
Pedersen worked as a youth manager at several Danish clubs before joining Red Bull Salzburg.

In 2014, he got his first job as a first team manager, when he became manager of HB Køge in the Danish 1st Division. He left on 23 December 2015 by mutual consent.

In 2016, he became Jens Keller's assistant manager at Union Berlin. Pedersen was sacked together with Keller on 4 December 2017.

On 30 May 2018, he was named new manager of Eintracht Braunschweig in the 3. Liga replacing Torsten Lieberknecht. He was sacked on 10 October 2018.

On 20 June 2019, he signed a 2 1/2-year contract with Norwegian club Strømsgodset. He left the club on 9 April 2021, after allegations arose that he had made racist remarks during his time with the club.

On 2 July 2021, Pedersen was announced as the new manager of Danish 1st Division club Vendsyssel FF.

=== Sheffield Wednesday ===
On 20 October 2023, Vendsyssel FF confirmed that Pedersen had joined EFL Championship club Sheffield Wednesday as the assistant head coach to Danny Röhl.

Pedersen extended his contract at the club in July 2025, saying that he and his family had fallen in love with the club and that he was "excited to continue his role at the club and getting back to work supporting the team and working with the great group of players".

Following Röhl leaving the club, Pedersen was promoted to manager on 31 July 2025, reportedly signing a three-year contract with the club. On the opening day of the 2025–26 season, Wednesday would face recently relegated Premier League club Leicester City going down to a 2–1 defeat, after a summer of turmoil due to owner Dejphon Chansiri not paying players and staff, and senior players leaving, left Pedersen with a squad of just 15 senior players. He gained his first point on the third day of the season, coming from 2–0 down to draw 2–2 against Wrexham. His first win as Wednesday manager came in September, defeating Portsmouth 2–0 with goals from Barry Bannan and George Brown. The remainder of the season would be difficult, with the club going into administration in October, resulting in an 18 point penalty, players sold in January, however Pedersen was constantly praised for keeping the club running and being competitive. The club was taken over by new owners Arise Capital Partners LLC prior to their game against West Bromwich Albion on the final day of the season, and Pedersen would guide the team to just their second win of the season with a 2–1 victory, which would see Wednesday finish the season on 0 points.

During the summer, incoming sporting director Simon Wilson confirmed that Pedersen would lead Sheffield Wednesday into the new season as manager. The season started with a 1–0 win against Bolton Wanderers in the EFL Cup. He was nominated for League One August Manger of the Month with 2 wins from his opening 3 games which included a 7–2 win at Bromley. Following the 2–0 defeat to Doncaster Rovers, it left him 1 win from 6 games and would see him leave the club.

== Managerial statistics ==
As of 24 October 2026

Managerial record by team and tenure
Team	From	To	Record					Ref.
Team	From	To	P	W	D	L	Win %	Ref.
HB Køge	1 July 2014	23 December 2015	59	23	15	21	39.0	
Eintracht Braunschweig	1 July 2018	10 October 2018	14	2	5	7	14.3	
Strømsgodset	20 June 2019	9 April 2021	49	13	15	21	26.5	
Vendsyssel FF	2 July 2021	20 October 2023	82	30	21	31	36.6	
Sheffield Wednesday	31 July 2025	25 October 2026	65	10	17	38	15.4	
Total			269	78	73	118	29.0	
