= Adelphi Hotel, Sheffield =

Former hotel in Sheffield, England

Coordinates: 53.3811°N 1.4669°W

The Adelphi Hotel was a hotel in the centre of the city of Sheffield, England.

It was connected with the founding of three major sports teams: Yorkshire County Cricket Club (1863), Sheffield Wednesday (1867) and Sheffield United (1889). The Sheffield Football Association was also formed at the hotel.

In 1854 a public meeting was held at the hotel where it was announced that a cricket ground would be built on Bramall Lane. This ground was later used to host Sheffield Wednesday matches and eventually became the permanent home of Sheffield United.

The hotel was demolished in 1969 to make way for the Crucible Theatre.
