= Norfolk Heritage Park =

Park in Sheffield, England

Coordinates: 53.36871°N 1.45291°W

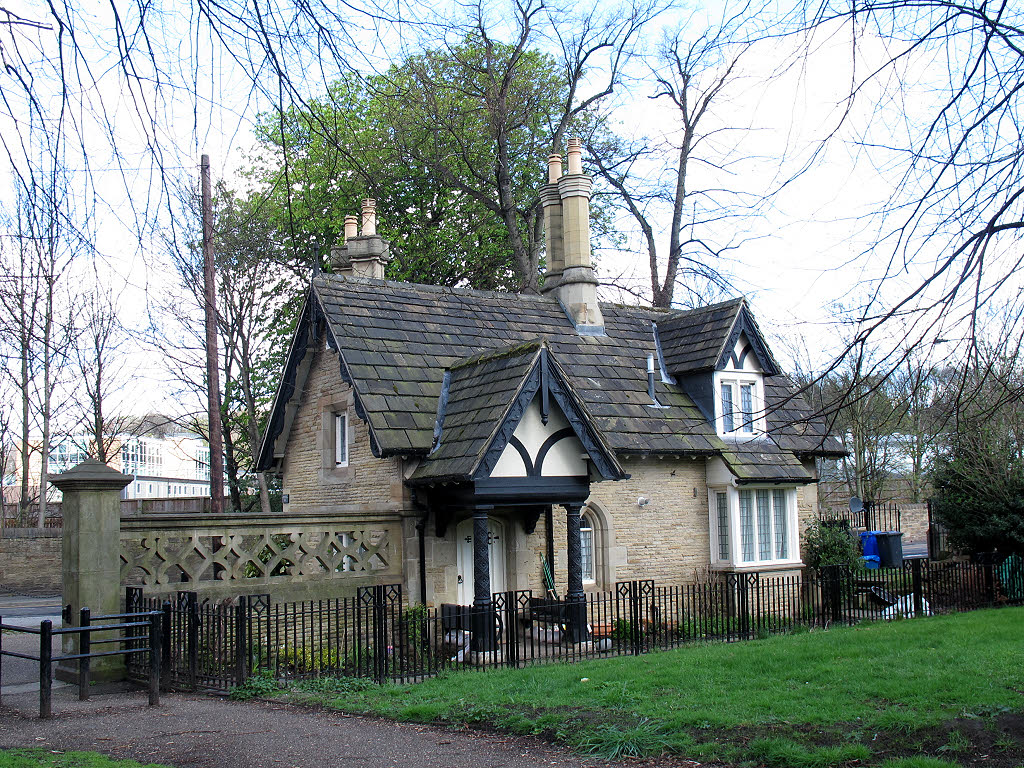
West Lodge

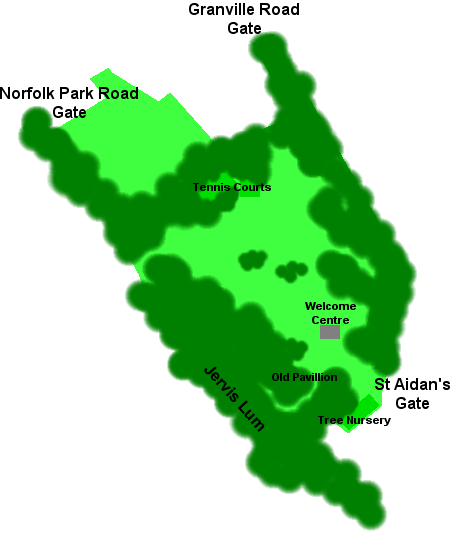
Plan of Norfolk Park

Norfolk Heritage Park (grid reference SK365859) (commonly referred to as 'Norfolk Park') is a 28-hectare (69-acre) public park in Sheffield, South Yorkshire, England surrounded by the Norfolk Park residential suburb.

Located to the south of Sheffield City Centre, the estate has grown up on part of the former deer park associated with Sheffield Manor. Norfolk Heritage Park is formed out of part of the deer park and was donated to the city of Sheffield by the Duke of Norfolk in Victorian times and enjoyed its heyday during Queen Victoria's reign. Later, the park fell into neglect and disrepair, but was renovated late in the 20th century.

In 2002, Sheffield Fayre, a family event featuring horticulture/wildlife, and multi-period re-enactment, was launched, and it is now an annual event during the late Summer Bank Holiday. With an attendance of over 25,000 people, the annual Sheffield Fayre at Norfolk Heritage Park is the largest free event in South Yorkshire. The various attractions include the popular Sheffield Horticultural Show and the largest multi-period Living History Camp and Battle Re-enactment in the North of England. Over 600 re-enactors in authentic costume enthusiastically recreate life through various eras from Roman times to the Second World War, encompassing live battles, fascinating displays, music and activities.

The Horticultural Show includes culinary, craft, art and photography classes.

September 2014 saw the official opening of a 'green link', providing paths and cycle ways between Norfolk Heritage Park and the city centre. The route includes the Cholera Mounument Grounds and Clay Wood, which provide a direct link to Shrewsbury Road and access to the railway station.

== History ==
Norfolk Park opened to the public in 1848, with work laying out the park having commenced in 1841 initiated by the 12th Duke of Norfolk who owned the land. Upon opening, it was one of the first parks in Britain to be free to the general public. The Stone screen and entrance gates at Norfolk Park Road and Guildford Avenue were erected in 1851, and finally at Granville Road in 1876. The park soon became a popular location for walking, playing sport, and taking carriage rides.

A football club, Norfolk F.C., played its home games in the park between 1861 and 1880.

Queen Victoria visited the park on 21 May 1897, during her Jubilee year, whilst visiting Sheffield to open the new Town Hall. 50,000 schoolchildren sang patriotic songs and hymns to the queen and a reported 200,000 people gathered to see her in the park (over two-thirds the population of the city at the time.

In 1910 Norfolk Park was given as a gift from the Duke of Norfolk to the City of Sheffield. To commemorate, a new Refreshment Pavilion was opened. In the years that followed a number of sporting facilities were constructed including bowling greens and tennis courts. A children's playground opened in the 1950s and in 1959 football pitches were created in the north of the park by creating a flat area from the toppings of the slum clearance of the city.

In 1956 Jervis Lum woodland on the west on the park was acquired by compulsory purchase from the Duke of Norfolk and added to the park.

During the 1970s the park attracted major events, including TV's 'It's A Knockout'.

During the later 1980s the park fell into decline, but this downward trend would be turned round towards the end of the century. 1994 saw the park added to the English Heritage Register of Historic Parks and Gardens (Grade II) and the establishment of the 'Friends of Norfolk Park' group. In the same year the park became more commonly known as Norfolk Heritage Park reflecting its heritage and cultural significance. 1995, the derelict Refreshment Pavilion was badly damaged by an arson attack and was demolished. The new refreshment pavilion, 'The centre in the Park', a new community building with rooms available for hire, a community cafe and Creche, opened to the public in 2000 along with new children's play areas, thanks to funding from the Heritage Lottery Fund acquired to restore the park.
