= Arbourthorne =

Electoral ward in the City of Sheffield, South Yorkshire, England

Coordinates: 53.360°N 1.440°W

Park & Arbourthorne
- Shown within Sheffield
- Population: 19,133 Ward. 2011
- Metropolitan borough: City of Sheffield
- Metropolitan county: South Yorkshire
- Region: Yorkshire and the Humber
- Country: England
- Sovereign state: United Kingdom
- UK Parliament: Sheffield Heeley
- Councillors: Mia Drazaic Labour Party); Nabeela Mowlana (Labour Party); Ben Miskell (Labour and Co-operative)

Park & Arbourthorne ward—which includes the districts of Arbourthorne, Gleadless, and Norfolk Park—is one of the 28 electoral wards in City of Sheffield, England. It is located in the southeastern part of the city and covers an area of 1.74 square miles (4.5 km^{2}). The population of this ward in 2001 was 17,500 people in 7,800 households. The ward population at the 2011 Census was 19,133. It is one of the five wards that form the Sheffield Heeley parliamentary constituency.

== Arbourthorne ==
Arbourthorne is located in the S2 postcode and is the home of Hope Family Arbourthorne Church, Holy Family Catholic Church (part of the parish centred on St Marie's Cathedral in Sheffield), Sheffield Springs Academy, and Norfolk and Arbourthorne primary schools. Much of the area consists of council housing, although some homes are now privately owned. The area is served by Arbourthorne Road and Spring Lane tram stops, both located on the Blue and Purple routes of the Supertram.

== Gleadless ==
Gleadless (grid reference SK382837) is a former village, since 1967 a suburb of Sheffield located in the southeastern portion of the city. The name comes from the Old English Glida Leah meaning a kite clearing in a wood. Gleadless is served by the Blue and Purple routes of the Supertram at Gleadless Townend tram stop on Ridgeway Road.

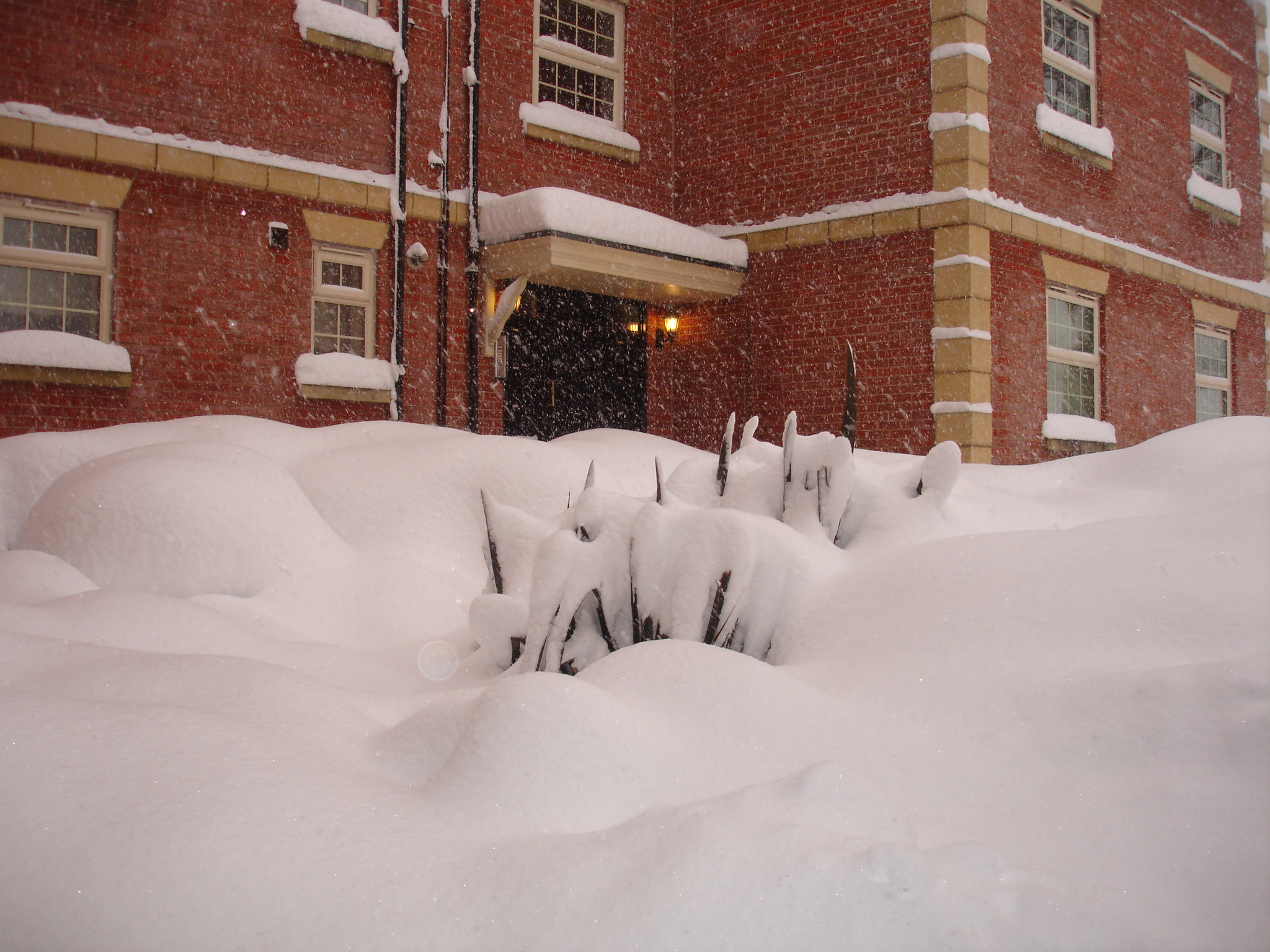
Snow falling in Gleadless, 1 December 2010

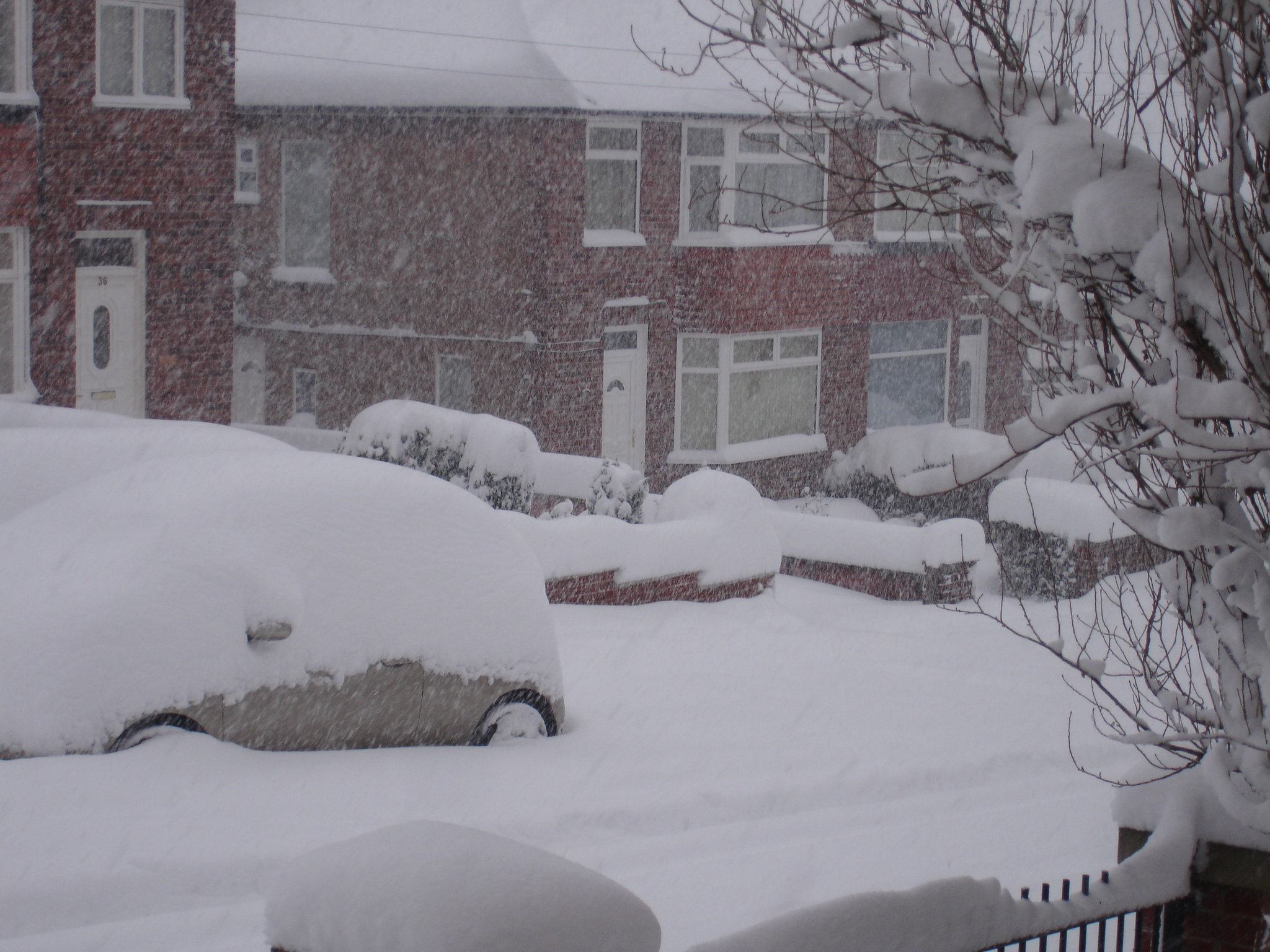
Snow falling in Gleadless, 1 December 2010

== Norfolk Park ==
Norfolk Park (grid reference SK365859) is a residential area of Sheffield that surrounds Norfolk Heritage Park close to the city centre. The area has been undergoing regeneration over the last few years with the demolition of the former high rise flats in favour of low rise housing with mixed private and local housing association ownership. A privately operated student village is located in the area next to the park. Norfolk Park is served by Park Grange Croft and Park Grange Road tram stops, both located on the Blue and Purple routes of the Supertram network.
