= FA Cup =

Association football tournament

- Organiser(s): The Football Association
- Founded: 1871; 155 years ago
- Region: England; Wales
- Teams: 747 (2026–27)
- Qualifier for: UEFA Europa League; FA Community Shield
- Current champions: Manchester City (8th title)
- Most championships: Arsenal (14 titles)
- Broadcaster(s): TNT Sports; BBC Sport
- Website: thefa.com
- 2026–27 FA Cup

The Football Association Challenge Cup, more commonly known as the FA Cup, is an annual knockout football competition in domestic English football. First played during the 1871–72 season, it is the oldest national football competition in the world. It is organised by and named after the Football Association (the FA). A concurrent Women's FA Cup has been held since 1970.

The competition is open to all eligible clubs down to level 9 of the English football league system, with level 10 clubs acting as stand-ins in the event of non-entries from above. A record 763 clubs competed in 2011–12. The tournament consists of 12 randomly drawn rounds followed by the semi-finals and the final. Entrants are not seeded, although a system of byes based on league level ensures higher ranked teams enter in later rounds – the minimum number of games needed to win, depending on which round a team enters the competition, ranges from six to fourteen.

The first six rounds are the Qualifying Competition, and are contested by clubs in the National League System, levels 5 to 10 of the English football system, more commonly called non-League. 32 of these teams progress to the first round of the Competition Proper, meeting the first of the 48 professional teams from Leagues One and Two. The last entrants are the 20 Premier League and 24 Championship clubs, into the draw for the third round proper. In the modern era, only one non-League team has ever reached the quarter-finals, and teams below Level 2 have never reached the final. (Note: Since the formation of the Football League in 1888, the only non-League club to win the FA Cup is Tottenham Hotspur in 1901. Since 1914, when Queens Park Rangers reached the fourth round proper (the last eight/quarter-final stage), the only non-League club to have reached that stage is Lincoln City in 2017. Both Tottenham and QPR achieved their feats whilst members of the Southern Football League, which ran parallel to the Football League until 1920, when the Football League expanded and absorbed the top division of the Southern League. Since then, the Southern League became part of the English league pyramid, below the Football League.) As a result, significant focus is given to the smaller teams who progress furthest, especially if they achieve an unlikely "giant-killing" victory.

Winners receive the FA Cup trophy, of which there have been two designs and five actual cups; the latest is a 2014 replica of the second design, introduced in 1911. Winners also qualify for the UEFA Europa League (formerly for the UEFA Cup Winners' Cup until 1998–99 season) and a place in the upcoming FA Community Shield. Arsenal are the most successful club with fourteen titles, most recently in 2020. Additionally, their former manager Arsène Wenger holds the record for most tournament wins, having secured seven titles. Manchester City are the current holders, having defeated Chelsea 1–0 in the 2026 final.

== History ==
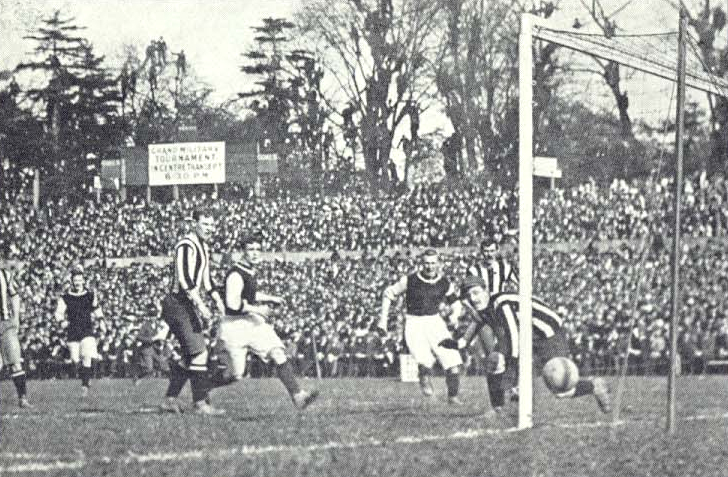
Harry Hampton scores one of his two goals in the 1905 FA Cup final, when Aston Villa defeated Newcastle United

In 1863, the newly founded Football Association (the FA) published the Laws of the Game of Association Football, unifying the various different rules in use before then. On 20 July 1871, in the offices of The Sportsman newspaper, the FA Secretary C. W. Alcock proposed to the FA committee that "it is desirable that a Challenge Cup should be established in connection with the Association for which all clubs belonging to the Association should be invited to compete". The inaugural FA Cup tournament kicked off in November 1871. After thirteen games in all, Wanderers were crowned the winners in the final, on 16 March 1872. Wanderers retained the trophy the following year. The modern cup was beginning to be established by the 1888–89 season, when qualifying rounds were introduced.

Following the 1914–15 edition, the competition was suspended in mid air due to the First World War, and did not resume until 1919–20. The 1923 FA Cup Final, commonly known as the "White Horse Final", was the first final to be played in the newly opened Wembley Stadium (known at the time as the Empire Stadium). The 1927 final saw "Abide with Me" being sung for the first time at the Cup final, which has become a pre-match tradition. Due to the outbreak of World War II, the competition was not played between the 1938–39 and 1945–46 editions. Because of the wartime breaks, the hundredth tournament did not take place until 1980–81.

After some confusion over the rules in its first competition, the FA decided that any drawn match would lead to a replay, with teams competing in further replays until a game was eventually won. Alvechurch and Oxford City contested the most replayed tie in the 1971–72 qualification, in a tie which went to 6 matches. Multiple replays were scrapped for the competition proper in 1991–92, and the qualifying rounds in 1997–98. Replays were removed altogether from the semi-final and final matches in 2000, from the quarter-finals in 2016–17, the fifth round in 2019–20 and the first round onwards from 2024–2025.

Redevelopment of Wembley saw the final played outside England for the first time, the 2001–2006 finals being played at the Millennium Stadium in Cardiff. The final returned to Wembley in 2007, followed by the semi-finals from 2008.

== Eligibility ==
An application window is open to clubs before entry lists, round byes and scheduling are announced in July. All clubs in the top four levels (the Premier League and the three divisions of the English Football League) are automatically eligible. Clubs from Level 5–9 (non-league football) are also eligible provided they play in either the FA Trophy or FA Vase competitions in the current season. All participating clubs must also have a stadium suitable for the competition and The Association may reject applications at its discretion.

Previously, Level 10 clubs were a prominent feature in early qualifying rounds. The gradual remodelling of the National League System to a 'perfect' 1–2–4–8–16 system, with a first phase in 2018–19, a final phase in 2021–22 (which included the promotion of 107 clubs), and played to a full quota in 2022–23 has resulted in a larger number of teams playing in Level 7–9. Consequently, for the FA Cup, entries equal the number in tiers 1–9 and is cut off to those below. Though still able to apply, Level 10 clubs are used as alternatives "subject to availability" in the event of a non/rejected applicant (with vacancies filled by Level 10 applicants with the best PPG (points per game) in the previous league season).

The total number of entries in the FA Cup has changed as Non-League football has gradually been expanded and reorganised over time. In the 2004–05 season, 660 clubs entered the competition, beating the long-standing record of 656 from the 1921–22 season. In 2005–06 this increased to 674 entrants, in 2006–07 to 687, in 2007–08 to 731 clubs, in 2008–09 and 2009–10 to 762. The total number of entries has also varied naturally from year-to-year as new clubs form and others dissolve at unequal rates. Though most leagues in the National League System maintain the same number of teams via reprieves, inevitably entry-level divisions (typically at tier 10) have to be impacted when a club leaves the pyramid. Therefore, for example, 759 teams entered in 2010–11, a record 763 in 2011–12, 758 in 2012–13, 737 in 2013–14 and 736 in 2014–15. However, since 2021–22, the FA has cut off automatic eligibility to the 10th tier (to appear only subject to availability) and instead set the size of the draw to match the more stable number of teams in Level 1–9. This means that the competition may now see a standardised number of entries from one year to the next. This number is currently 732 but could rise to 748 for 2023–24 with plans for a new SWPL 9th tier division to share the South West with the existing Western League.

It is very rare for top clubs to miss the competition, although it can happen in exceptional circumstances. Manchester United did not defend their title in 1999–2000, as they were already in the inaugural Club World Championship. The club stated that entering both tournaments would overload their fixture schedule and make it more difficult to defend their Champions League and Premier League titles. The club claimed that they did not want to devalue the FA Cup by fielding a weaker side. The move benefited United as they received a two-week break and won the 1999–2000 league title by an 18-point margin, although they did not progress past the group stage of the Club World Championship. The withdrawal from the FA Cup, however, drew considerable criticism as this weakened the tournament's prestige and Sir Alex Ferguson later admitted his regret regarding their handling of the situation.

Welsh sides that play in English leagues are eligible, although since the creation of the League of Wales there are only five clubs remaining: Cardiff City, (the only non-English team to win the tournament, in 1927), Swansea City, Newport County, Wrexham, and Merthyr Town. In the early years other teams from Wales, Ireland and Scotland also took part in the competition, with Glasgow side Queen's Park losing the final to Blackburn Rovers in 1884 and 1885 before being barred from entering by the Scottish Football Association.

Entries from clubs affiliated to "offshore" associations are also eligible subject to consideration on an annual basis, with special provisions that may apply. In the 2013–14 season, the first Channel Island club entered the competition when Guernsey F.C. competed. The first game played in the Channel Islands – and thus the southernmost FA Cup tie played – took place on 7 August 2021 between Jersey Bulls and Horsham YMCA. A third club, F.C. Isle of Man, was also eligible to play in 2022–23, but, in the end, all Crown Dependency teams either did not appear on the entry list or later withdrew.

== Competition format ==
=== Overview ===
Beginning in August, the competition proceeds as a knockout tournament throughout, consisting of twelve rounds, a semi-final and then a final, in May. A system of byes ensures clubs above level 9 enter the competition at later stages. There is no seeding, the fixtures in each round being determined by a random draw. Fixtures ending in a tie are replayed once only (from the 2024–25 campaign, prior to the first round proper). The first six rounds are qualifiers, with the draws organised on a regional basis. The next six rounds are the "proper" rounds where all clubs are in one draw.

=== Schedule ===
All entrants from Level 9 begin the competition in the extra preliminary round, and any Level 10 team filling in for a vacancy. Teams from Level 8 are ranked on their PPG in the previous season, except newly promoted teams automatically ranked towards the bottom and newly relegated teams ranked to the top; teams are then split between entering at either the Extra-Preliminary or preliminary round so as to ensure the right balance of fixtures throughout the competition. From there, clubs from higher levels are added in later rounds, as per the table below.

The months in which rounds are played are traditional, with exact dates subject to each calendar. The number of new entries, winners from previous rounds, and division of Level 8 teams in the two preliminary rounds are based on an entry list of 732 modelled on the English league system as of 2022–23. From 2023–2024, the entry list could rise to 746 in line with sixteen additional clubs at Level 9, meaning that the extra preliminary round would have 444 teams, with only 50 Level 8 clubs entering at the preliminary round.

Round	Month	Clubs entering this round	New entries this round	Winners from previous round	Number of fixtures
Qualifying Competition
Extra preliminary round	August	Level 8 clubs (96 lowest ranked); Level 9 clubs Any vacancies are filled by Level 10.	416		208
Preliminary round	August	Level 8 clubs (64 highest ranked)	64	208	136
First round	September	Level 7 clubs	88	136	112
Second round	September	Level 6 clubs	48	112	80
Third round	October	none	0	80	40
Fourth round	October	Level 5 clubs	24	40	32
Competition Proper
First round	November	Level 3 and 4 clubs	48	32	40
Second round	December	none	0	40	20
Third round	January	Level 1 and 2 clubs	44	20	32
Fourth round	February	none	0	32	16
Fifth round	March	none	0	16	8
Quarter-finals	March	none	0	8	4
Semi-finals	April	none	0	4	2
Final	May	none	0	2	1

The qualifying rounds are regionalised to reduce the travel costs for smaller non-league sides. The first and second proper rounds were also previously split into Northern and Southern sections, but this practice was ended after the 1997–98 competition.

The final is normally held the Saturday after the Premier League season finishes in May. The only seasons in recent times when this pattern was not followed were: 1999–2000, when most rounds were played a few weeks earlier than normal as an experiment; 2010–11 and 2012–13 when the FA Cup Final was played before the Premier League season had finished, to allow Wembley Stadium to be ready for the UEFA Champions League final, and in 2011–12 to allow England time to prepare for that summer's European Championships; 2019–20 when the final was delayed until August due to the COVID-19 pandemic in the United Kingdom, and 2022 and 2025 when the final was held a week before the end of the league.

=== Draws ===
The draws for the Extra Preliminary, Preliminary, and first qualifying rounds used to all occur at the same time. Thereafter, the draw for each subsequent round is not made until after the scheduled dates for the previous round, meaning that in the case of replays, clubs will often know their future opponents in advance.

The draw for each of the proper rounds is broadcast live on television, usually taking place at the conclusion of live coverage of one of the games of the previous round. Public interest is particularly high during the draw for the third round, which is where the top-ranked teams are added to the draw.

=== Tiebreaking ===
Until 2024-25, rounds up to and including the fourth round proper, fixtures resulting in a draw (after normal time) went to a replay, played at the venue of the away team, at a later date; if that replay was still tied, the winner was settled by a period of extra time, and if still necessary, a penalty shootout. Since 2016–17, ties have been settled on the day from the quarter-finals onwards, using extra time and penalties. From 2018–19, Fifth round ties have also been settled by extra time and penalties. Beginning with the 2024–25 competition, replays have been scrapped from the first round onwards to accommodate the expanded schedule of UEFA Champions League and UEFA Europa League. The decision to scrap replays received criticism from a number of lower-tier clubs and government officials.

Until 1990–91, further replays would be played until one team was victorious. In 1971–72, a fourth qualifying round game between Alvechurch and Oxford City was played six times until Alvechurch won in the fifth replay. In their 1975 campaign, Fulham played 12 games over six rounds, which remains the most games played by a team to reach a final. Replays were traditionally played three or four days after the original game, but from 1991–92 they were staged at least 10 days later on police advice for the rounds proper. This led to penalty shoot-outs being introduced, the first of which came on 26 November 1991 when Rotherham United eliminated Scunthorpe United.

From 1980–81 to 1998–99, the semi-finals went to extra time on the day if the score after 90 minutes was a draw. If the score was still level after extra time, the match would go to a replay. Replays for the semi-finals were scrapped for 1999–2000; the last semi-final to go into a replay was in 1998–99, when Manchester United beat rivals Arsenal 2–1 after extra time, following a 0–0 draw in the original match.

The first FA Cup Final to go to extra time and a replay was the 1875 final, between the Royal Engineers and the Old Etonians. The initial tie finished 1–1 but the Royal Engineers won the replay 2–0 in normal time. The last replayed final was the 1993 FA Cup Final, when Arsenal and Sheffield Wednesday fought a 1–1 draw. The replay saw Arsenal win the FA Cup, 2–1 after extra time.

The last quarter-final to go to a replay was Manchester United vs West Ham United in the 2015–16 FA Cup. The original game at Old Trafford ended in a 1–1 draw, while Manchester United won the replay at the Boleyn Ground, 2–1. It was also the last FA Cup game ever played at the Boleyn Ground.

The last fifth round replay saw Tottenham Hotspur defeat Rochdale 6–1 at Wembley in the 2017–18 FA Cup after the first match at Spotland Stadium ended in a 2–2 draw.

== Qualification for subsequent competitions ==
=== European football ===
The FA Cup winners qualify for the following season's UEFA Europa League (formerly named the UEFA Cup); they previously entered the UEFA Cup Winners' Cup from its launch in 1960 until its final edition in 1998. This European place applies even if the team is relegated or is not in the English top flight. In the past, if the FA Cup winning team also qualified for the following season's Champions League or Europa League through their league or European performance, then the losing FA Cup finalists were given the European berth of the League Cup winners and the League Cup winners would be given the league berth instead. FA Cup winners enter the Europa League at the group stage but losing finalists, if they had not qualified for Europe via the league, began earlier, at the play-off or third qualifying round stage. During the Cup Winners' Cup era, if a team had already qualified for the UEFA Cup, they were promoted to the Cup Winners' Cup and their initial UEFA Cup berth would be transferred to the next league team. From the 2015–16 UEFA Europa League season, however, UEFA does not allow the runners-up to qualify for the Europa League through the competition. If the winner of the FA Cup has already qualified for a European Competition through their Premier League position, the Europa League berth is then given to the highest placed team in the Premier League who has not yet qualified for a European Competition.

=== FA Community Shield ===
The FA Cup winners also qualify for the following season's single-match FA Community Shield, the traditional season opener played against the previous season's Premier League champions (or the Premier League runners-up if the FA Cup winners also won the league – the double).

== Venues ==
Since 2007, the FA Cup final has been held at Wembley Stadium, on the site of the previous stadium which hosted it from 1923 to 2000.

Fixtures in the 12 rounds of the competition are usually played at the home ground of one of the two teams. The semi-finals and final are played at a neutral venue – the rebuilt Wembley Stadium.

=== Competition rounds ===
In the matches for the 12 competition rounds, the team who plays at home is decided when the fixtures are drawn – simply the first team drawn out for each fixture. Occasionally games may have to be moved to other grounds due to other events taking place, security reasons or a ground not being suitable to host popular teams. However, since 2003, clubs cannot move grounds to the away side's for capacity or financial reasons. If any move has to be made, it has to be to a neutral venue and any additional monies earned by the move goes into the central pot. In the event of a draw, the replay is played at the ground of the team who originally played away from home.

In the days when multiple replays were possible, the second replay (and any further replays) were played at neutral grounds. The clubs involved could alternatively agree to toss for home advantage in the second replay.

=== Semi-finals ===
The semi-finals have been played exclusively at the rebuilt Wembley Stadium since 2008, one year after it opened and after it had already hosted a final (in 2007). For the first decade of the competition, the Kennington Oval was used as the semi-final venue. In the period between this first decade and the reopening of Wembley, semi-finals were played at high-capacity neutral venues around England; usually the home grounds of teams not involved in that semi-final, chosen to be roughly equidistant between the two teams for fairness of travel. The top three most used venues in this period were Villa Park in Birmingham (55 times), Hillsborough in Sheffield (34 times) and Old Trafford in Manchester (23 times). The original Wembley Stadium was also used seven times for semi-finals, between 1991 and 2000 (the last held there), but not always for fixtures featuring London teams. In 2005, both were held at the Millennium Stadium.

In 2003 the FA decided to permanently use the new Wembley for semi-finals to recoup debts in financing the new stadium. This was controversial, with the move seen as both unfair to fans of teams located far from London, and taking some of the prestige away from a Wembley final. In defending the move, the FA has also cited the extra capacity Wembley offers, although the 2013 fixture between Millwall and Wigan Athletic led to the unprecedented step of placing 6,000 tickets on sale to neutral fans after the game failed to sell out. A fan poll by The Guardian in 2013 found 86% opposition to Wembley semi-finals.

=== Final ===
The final has been played at the rebuilt Wembley Stadium since it opened, in 2007. The rebuilding process meant that between 2001 and 2006 they were hosted at the Millennium Stadium in Cardiff in Wales. Prior to rebuilding, the final was hosted by the original Wembley Stadium since it opened in 1923 (being originally named the Empire Stadium). One exception to this 78-year series of Empire Stadium finals (including five replays) was the 1970 replay between Leeds United and Chelsea, held at Old Trafford in Manchester.

In the 51 years prior to the Empire Stadium opening, the final (including 8 replays) was held in a variety of locations, predominantly in London, and mainly at the Kennington Oval and then Crystal Palace. It was played 22 times at The Oval (the inaugural competition in 1872, and then all but two times until 1892). After The Oval, Crystal Palace hosted 21 finals from 1895 to 1914, broken up by four replays elsewhere. The other London venues were Stamford Bridge from 1920 to 1922 (the last three finals before the move to Empire Stadium); and the University of Oxford's Lillie Bridge in Fulham for the second ever final, in 1873. The other venues used sparingly in this period were all outside of London, as follows:

- Racecourse Ground, Derby (1886)
- Fallowfield Stadium, Manchester (1893)
- Goodison Park, Liverpool (1894)
- Burnden Park, Bolton (1901 replay)
- Goodison Park (1910 replay)
- Old Trafford, Manchester (1911 replay)
- Bramall Lane, Sheffield (1912 replay)
- Old Trafford (1915)

=== Artificial turf ===
The FA permitted artificial turf (3G) pitches in all rounds of the competition from the 2014–15 edition and beyond. Under the 2015–16 rules, the pitch must be of FIFA One Star quality, or Two Star for ties if they involve one of the 92 professional clubs. This followed approval two years previously for their use in the qualifying rounds only – if a team with a 3G pitch progressed to the competition proper, they had to switch their tie to the ground of another eligible entrant with a natural grass pitch. Having been strong proponents of the surface, the first match in the proper rounds to be played on a 3G surface was a televised first round replay at Maidstone United's Gallagher Stadium on 20 November 2014.

== Trophy ==
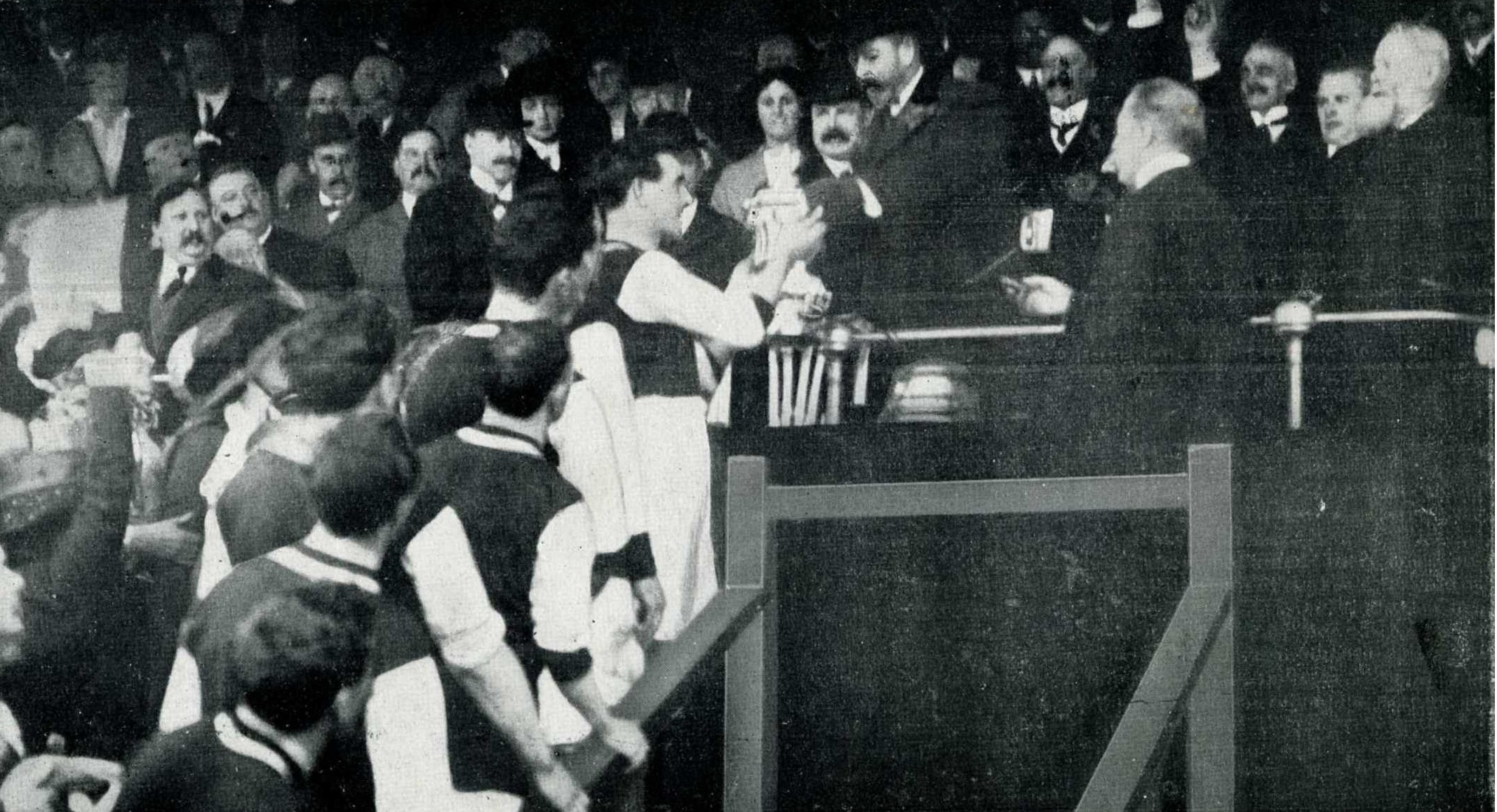
King George V presents the FA Cup trophy to Tommy Boyle of Burnley, April 1914

The winners of the competition are awarded the FA Cup, but do not retain ownership. It is only loaned to the club by the FA; under the current (2015–16) rules it must be returned by 1 March of the following year, or earlier if given seven days' notice. Traditionally, the holders had the Cup until the following year's presentation, although more recently the trophy has been taken on publicity tours by the FA in between finals.

The trophy comes in three parts – the cup itself, plus a lid and a base. There have been two designs of trophy in use, but five physical trophies have been presented. The original trophy, known as the "little tin idol", was 18 in (460 mm) high and made by Martin, Hall & Co. It was stolen in 1895 and never recovered, and so was replaced by an exact replica, used until 1910. The FA decided to change the design after the 1909 winners, Manchester United, made their own replica, leading the FA to realise they did not own the copyright. This new, larger design was by Fattorini and Sons, and was used from 1911. In order to preserve this original, from 1992 it was replaced by an exact replica, although this had to be replaced after just over two decades, after showing wear and tear from being handled more than in previous eras. This third replica, first used in 2014, was built heavier to withstand the increased handling.

Originally commissioned in 2013, the current trophy was handcrafted using the similar age-old techniques, including casting, hand-chasing, hand-engraving and polishing. It included many of the trophy's original features, including grapes, vines and fluting. It also incorporated the base from the previous edition and engraving on the plinth. Speaking at the unveiling of the third trophy in the competition's history, Alex Horne, the then general secretary of the FA, explained why the FA had taken the decision to replace its 22-year-old predecessor. "The current trophy is fragile and is too delicate to continue to repair, so must be retired for these reasons", he said. "However, it will remain cherished and will forever be an integral part of The FA Cup's rich history."

Kevin Baker, Chief Executive and founder the makers of the current FA Cup trophy, Thomas Lyte, said: "After many years of restoring the previous trophy, we are honoured to be making the new FA Cup. This sporting trophy is a national treasure, an icon of English football, and its heritage is embedded within the design and the craft of the new trophy. Thomas Lyte prides itself on the skills of its expert silversmiths and this iconic symbol of competition and fair play couldn't be in better hands."

Of the four surviving trophies, only the 1895 replica has entered private ownership. The name of the winning team is engraved on the silver band around the base as soon as the final has finished, in order to be ready in time for the presentation ceremony. This means the engraver has just five minutes to perform a task which would take 20 under normal conditions, although time is saved by engraving the year on during the match, and sketching the presumed winner. During the final, the trophy is decorated with ribbons in the colours of both finalists, with the loser's ribbons being removed at the end of the game. The tradition of tying ribbons started after Tottenham Hotspur won the 1901 FA Cup Final and the wife of a Spurs director decided to tie blue and white ribbons to the handles of the cup. Traditionally, at Wembley finals, the presentation is made at the Royal Box, with players, led by the captain, mounting a staircase to a gangway in front of the box and returning by a second staircase on the other side of the box. At Cardiff the presentation was made on a podium on the pitch.

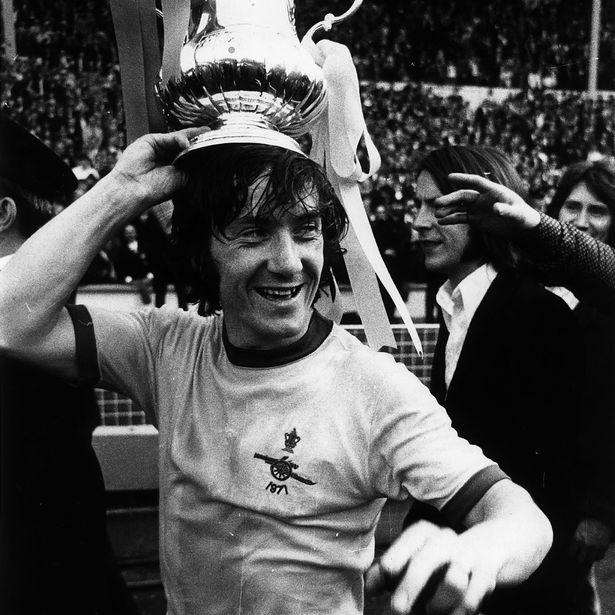
George Armstrong celebrating with the FA Cup trophy following Arsenal's win over Liverpool in the 1971 final.

The tradition of presenting the trophy immediately after the game did not start until the 1882 final; after the first final in 1872 the trophy was not presented to the winners, Wanderers, until a reception held four weeks later in the Pall Mall Restaurant in London. Under the original rules, the trophy was to be permanently presented to any club which won the competition three times, although when inaugural winners Wanderers achieved this feat by the 1876 final, the rules were changed by FA Secretary CW Alcock (who was also captain of Wanderers in their first victory).

Portsmouth have the distinction of being the football club which has held the FA Cup trophy for the longest uninterrupted period—seven years. Portsmouth had defeated Wolverhampton Wanderers 4–1 in the 1939 FA Cup Final and were awarded the trophy as 1938–39 FA Cup winners. But with the outbreak of World War II in September 1939, the regular Football League and FA Cup competitions for the 1939–40 season were cancelled for the duration of the war. Portsmouth's manager Jack Tinn was rumoured to have kept the FA Cup trophy 'safe under his bed' throughout the duration of the war, but this is an urban myth. Because the naval city of Portsmouth was a primary strategic military target for German Luftwaffe bombing, the FA Cup trophy was actually taken 10 mi (16 km) to the north of Portsmouth, to the nearby Hampshire village of Lovedean, and there it resided in a thatched-roof country pub called The Bird in Hand for the seven years of the war. After the conclusion of World War II, the FA Cup trophy was presented back to the Football Association by the club in time for the 1946 FA Cup Final.

=== Original design from 1871 ===
==== 1871 original ====
The first trophy, the 'little tin idol', was made by Martin, Hall & Co at a cost of £20. It was stolen from a Birmingham shoe shop window belonging to William Shillcock while held by Aston Villa on 11 September 1895 and was never seen again. Despite a £10 reward for information, the crime was never solved. As it happened while it was in their care, the FA fined Villa £25 to pay for a replacement.

Just over 60 years later, 80 year old career criminal Henry (Harry) James Burge claimed to have committed the theft, confessing to a newspaper, with the story being published in the Sunday Pictorial newspaper on 23 February 1958. He claimed to have carried out the robbery with two other men, although when discrepancies with a contemporaneous report in the Birmingham Post newspaper (the crime pre-dated written police reports) in his account of the means of entry and other items stolen, detectives decided there was no realistic possibility of a conviction and the case was closed. Burge claimed the cup had been melted down to make counterfeit half-crown coins, which matched known intelligence of the time, in which stolen silver was being used to forge coins which were then laundered through betting shops at a local racecourse, although Burge had no history of forgery in a record of 42 previous convictions for which he had spent 42 years in prison. He had been further imprisoned in 1957 for seven years for theft from cars. Released in 1961, he died in 1964.

==== 1895 replica ====
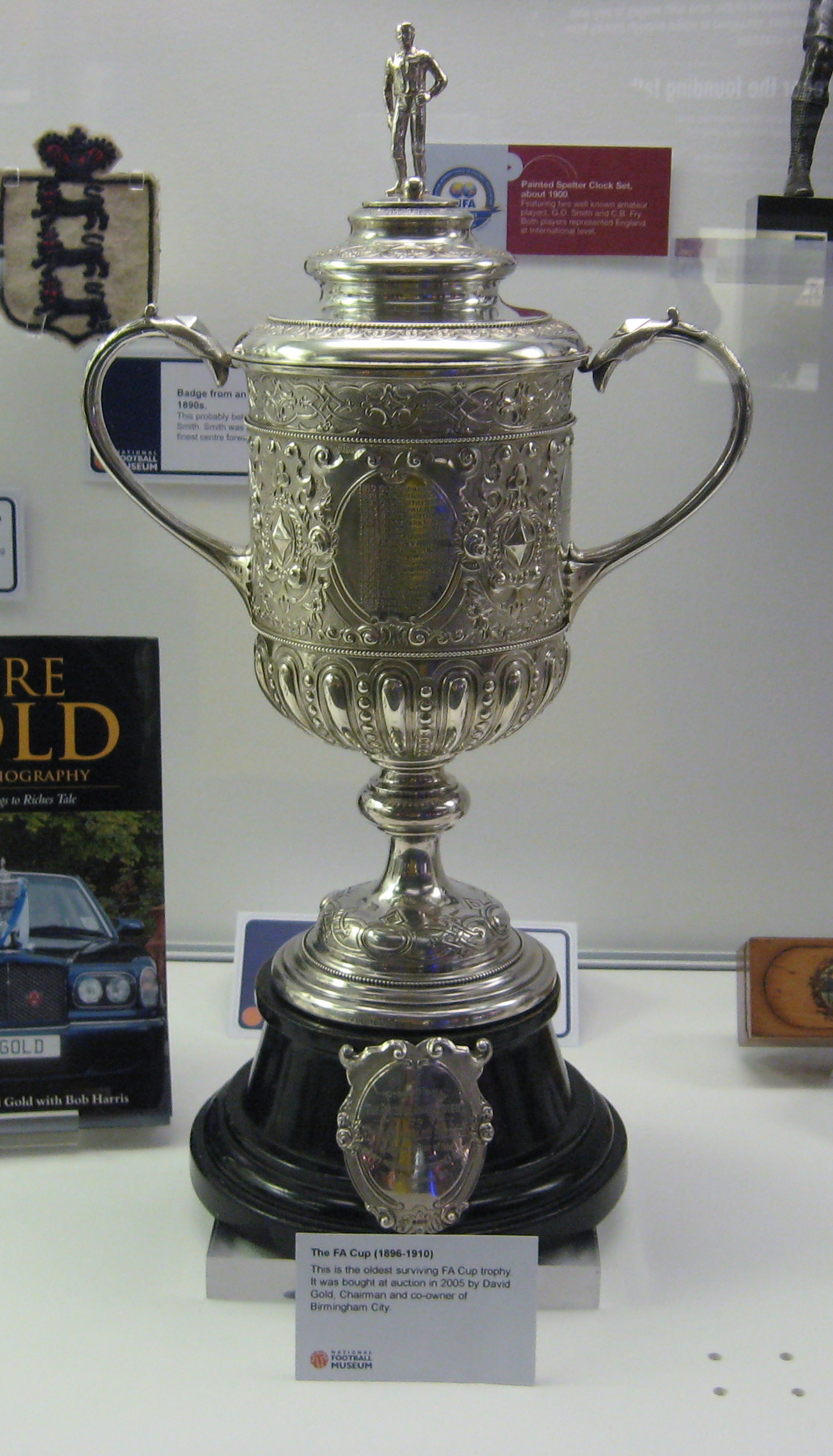
The second FA Cup trophy, used between 1896 and 1910

After the theft, a replica of the trophy was made, which was used until a redesign of the trophy in 1911. The 1895 replica was then presented to the FA's long-serving president Lord Kinnaird. Kinnaird died in 1923, and his family kept it in their possession, out of view, until putting it up for auction in 2005. It was sold at Christie's auction house on 19 May 2005 for £420,000 (£478,400 including auction fees and taxes). The sale price set a new world record for a piece of football memorabilia, surpassing the £254,000 paid for the Jules Rimet World Cup Trophy in 1997. The successful bidder was David Gold, the then joint chairman of Birmingham City; claiming the FA and government were doing nothing proactive to ensure the trophy remained in the country, Gold stated his purchase was motivated by wanting to save it for the nation. Accordingly, Gold presented the trophy to the National Football Museum in Preston on 20 April 2006, where it went on immediate public display. It later moved with the museum to its new location in Manchester. In November 2012, it was ceremonially presented to Royal Engineers, after they beat Wanderers 7–1 in a charity replay of the first FA Cup final. In September 2020, Gold sold the replica trophy for £760,000 through the Bonhams auction house. In January 2021, it was revealed that the trophy had been purchased by Sheikh Mansour bin Zayed Al Nahyan, the owner of Manchester City, who stated that it would be returned on loan to the National Football Museum.

=== Current design from 1911 ===
==== 1911 original ====
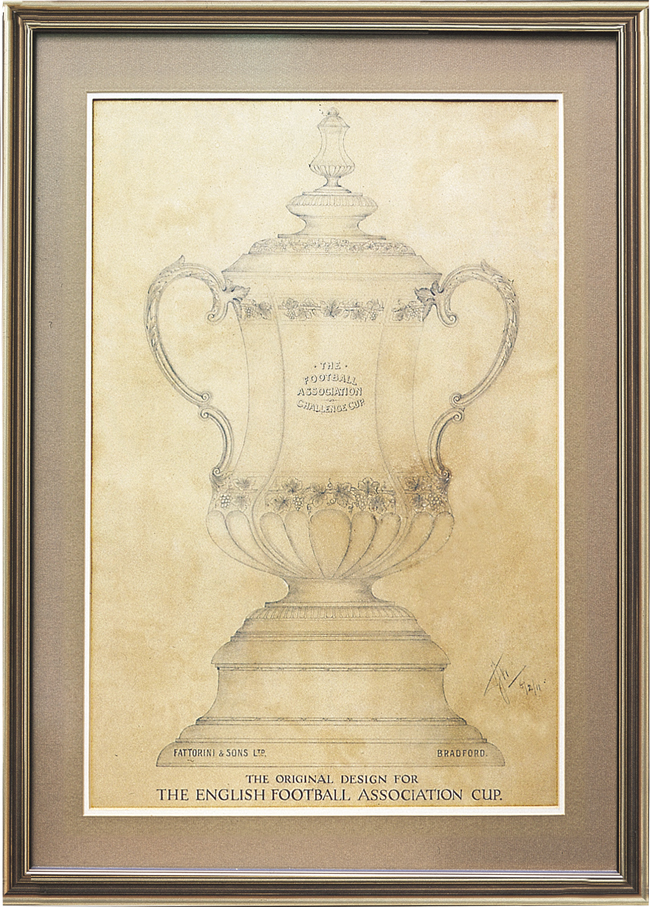
FA Cup trophy design by Fattorini & Sons, 1911

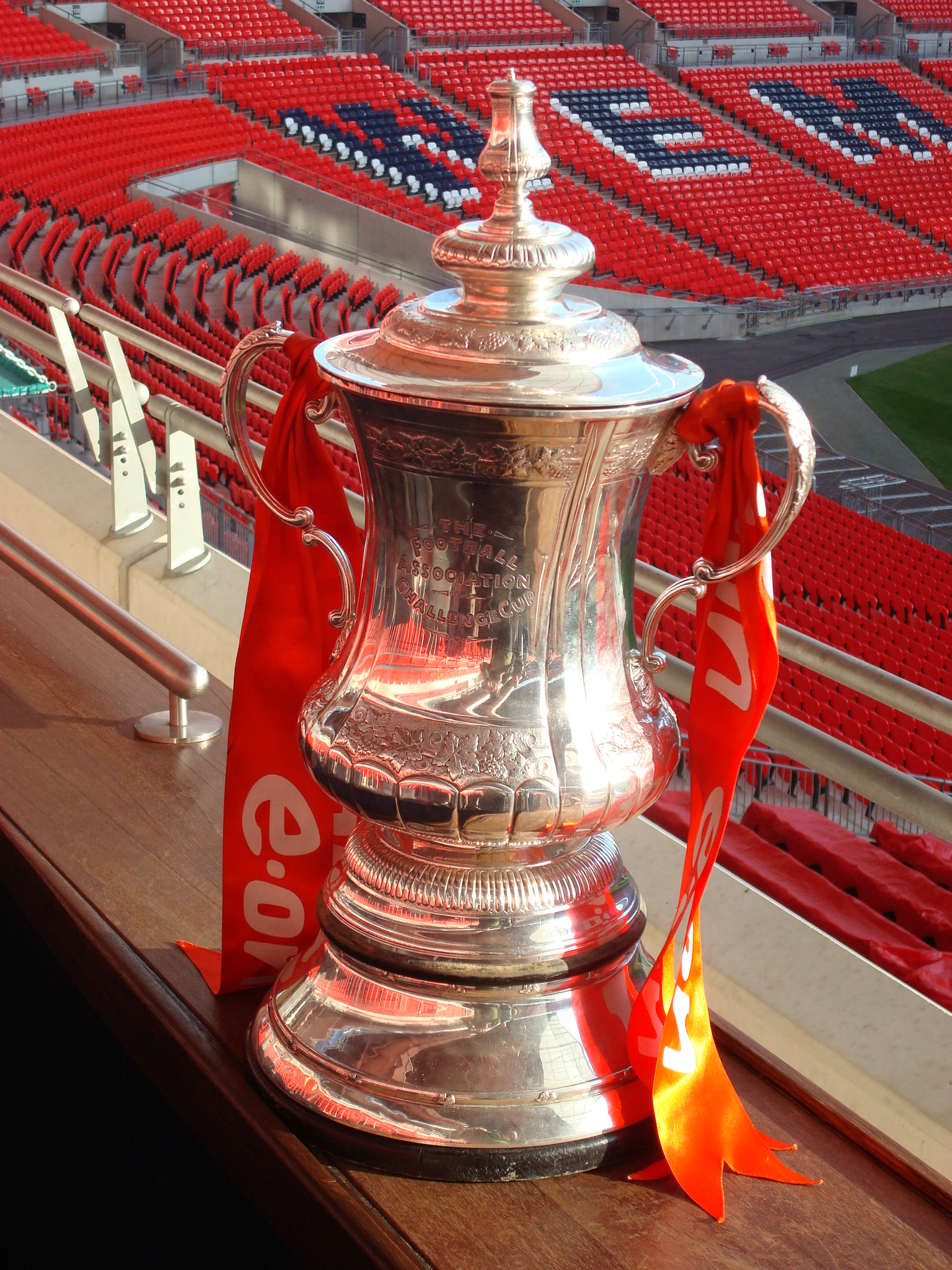
The current design of the FA Cup (1992 replica pictured)

The redesigned trophy first used in 1911 was larger at 61.5 cm (24.2 inches) high, and was designed and manufactured by Fattorini & Sons of Bradford, coincidentally being won by Bradford City in its first outing.

On 27 March 2016 episode of the BBC television programme Antiques Roadshow, this trophy was valued at £1 million by expert Alastair Dickenson, although he suggested that, due to the design featuring depictions of grapes and vines, it may not have been specifically produced for the FA, but was instead an off-the-shelf design originally meant to be a wine or champagne cooler. This was later disproved when Thomas Fattorini was invited to the Antiques Roadshow to "ambush" Alastair Dickenson with the competition winning design by Fattorini & Sons. The show was filmed at Baddesley Clinton and subsequently aired on 23 October 2016.

A smaller but otherwise identical replica was also made by the company Thomas Fattorini for the North Wales Coast FA Cup trophy which is contested annually by members of that regional Association.

==== 1992 replica ====
The 1992 replica was made by Toye, Kenning and Spencer. A copy of this trophy was also produced, in case anything happened to the primary trophy.

==== 2014 replica ====
The 2014 replica was made by Thomas Lyte, handcrafted in sterling 925 silver over 250 hours. A weight increase for greater durability has taken it to 6.3 kilograms (14 lb).

== Medals ==
Each club in the final receives 40 winners or runners-up medals to be distributed among players, staff and officials. The traditional styles of gold-cased medals – the winners' medal, which had remained largely unchanged since the 1890s, and runners-up medals, which were last updated in 1946 – were replaced for the 2021 final by new designs of gold winners' medals and silver runners-up medals suspended on a ribbon.

== Sponsorship ==
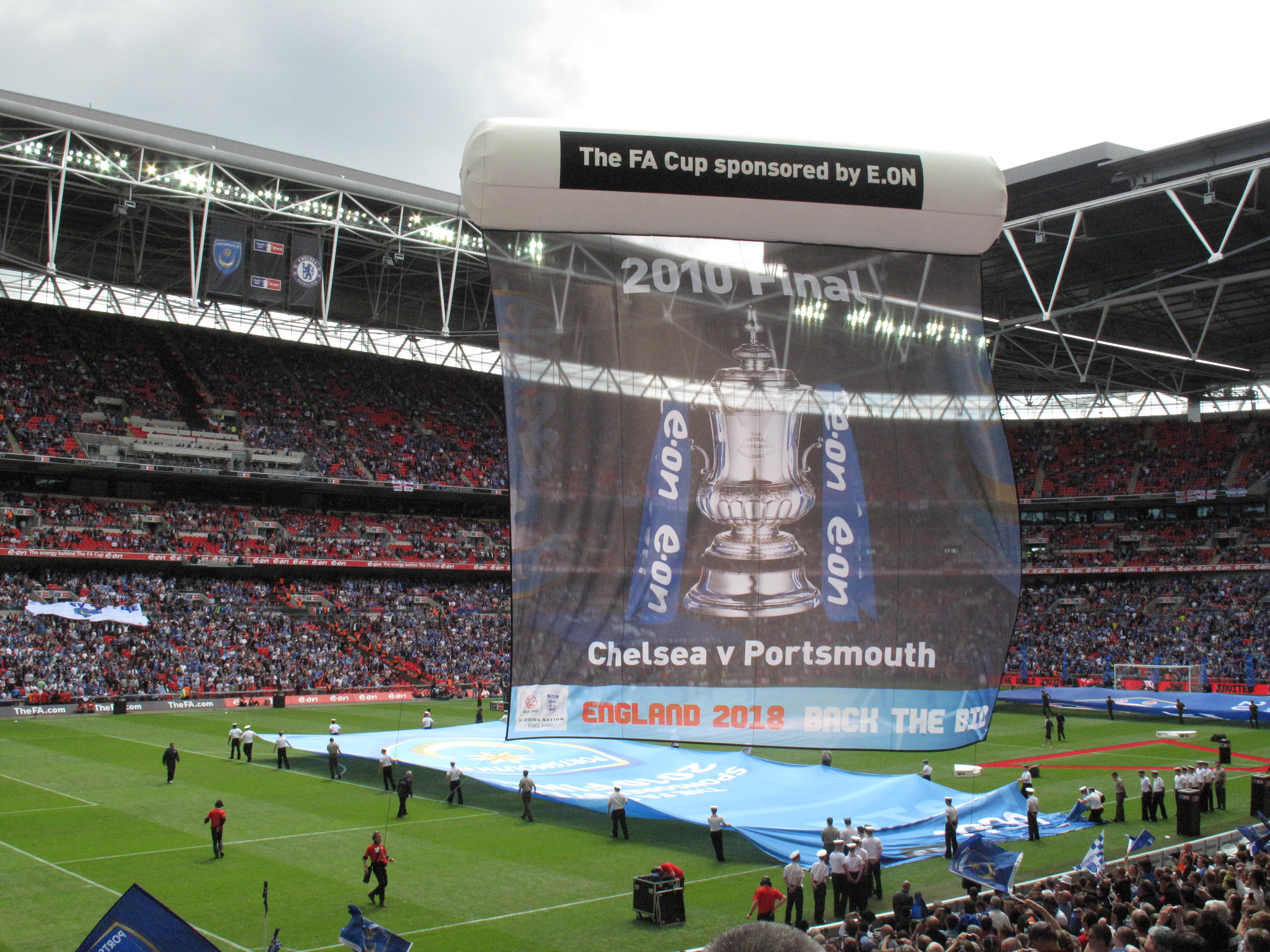
The pre-match ceremony ahead of the 2010 FA Cup Final featuring sponsorship by E.ON

Since the start of the 1994–95 season, the FA Cup has been sponsored. However, to protect the identity of the competition, the sponsored name has always included 'The FA Cup' in addition to the sponsor's name unlike sponsorship deals for the League Cup, where the word 'Cup' is preceded by the sponsor's name (eg. Milk Cup). Sponsorship deals run for four years, although – as in the case of E.ON – extensions may be agreed. Emirates has been the sponsor since 2015, renaming the competition as 'The Emirates FA Cup' unlike previous years, when it was called 'The FA Cup sponsored by E.ON' or 'The FA Cup with Budweiser'. The Emirates' sponsorship deal, originally scheduled to terminate in 2018, was later extended three times until 2021, 2024, and 2028. The 2020 edition final was renamed as the 'Heads Up FA Cup final' to promote mental health awareness.

Period	Sponsor	Name	Trophy
1871–1994	—N/a	The FA Cup	Original
1994–1998	Littlewoods	The FA Cup sponsored by Littlewoods	Original
1998–2002	Axa	The AXA sponsored FA Cup (1998–1999); The FA Cup sponsored by AXA (1999–2002)	Original
2002–2006	—N/a	The FA Cup	Original
2006–2011	E.ON	The FA Cup sponsored by E.ON	Original
2011–2014	Budweiser	The FA Cup with Budweiser	Original
2014–2015	—N/a	The FA Cup	Original
2015–2028	Emirates	Emirates FA Cup	Original

From 2006 to 2013, Umbro supplied match balls for all FA Cup matches. They were replaced at the start of the 2013–14 season by Nike, who produced the competition's official match ball for five seasons. Mitre took over for the 2018–19 season, beginning a three-year partnership with the FA.

== Records and statistics ==
=== Final ===
==== Team ====
- Most wins: 14, Arsenal (1930, 1936, 1950, 1971, 1979, 1993, 1998, 2002, 2003, 2005, 2014, 2015, 2017, 2020)
- Most consecutive wins: 3, joint record:
  - Wanderers (1876, 1877, 1878)
  - Blackburn Rovers (1884, 1885, 1886)
- Most appearances in a final: 22
  - Manchester United (1909, 1948, 1957, 1958, 1963, 1976, 1977, 1979, 1983, 1985, 1990, 1994, 1995, 1996, 1999, 2004, 2005, 2007, 2016, 2018, 2023, 2024)
- Most consecutive appearances in a final: 4
  - Manchester City (2023, 2024, 2025 and 2026).
- Most consecutive finals losses: 3
  - Chelsea (2020, 2021, 2022)
- Most final appearances without ever winning: 2, joint record:
  - Queen's Park (1884, 1885)
  - Birmingham City (1931, 1956)
  - Watford (1984, 2019)
- Most final appearances without ever losing: 5, Wanderers (1872, 1873, 1876, 1877, 1878)
- Most final appearances without losing (streak): 7, joint record:
  - Tottenham Hotspur (1901, 1921, 1961, 1962, 1967, 1981, 1982)
  - Arsenal (2002, 2003, 2005, 2014, 2015, 2017, 2020)
- Longest gap between wins: 69 years, Portsmouth (1939–2008)
- Biggest win in a final: 6 goals, joint record:
  - Bury 6–0 Derby County (1903)
  - Manchester City 6–0 Watford (2019)
- Most goals in a final: 7:
  - Blackburn Rovers 6–1 Sheffield Wednesday (1890)
  - Blackpool 4–3 Bolton Wanderers (1953)
- Most goals by a losing side: 3:
  - Bolton Wanderers: Lost 3–4 against Blackpool (1953)
  - West Ham United: Drew 3–3 but lost in a penalty shootout against Liverpool (2006)
- Most defeats in a final: 9 times, joint record:
  - Chelsea (1915, 1967, 1994, 2002, 2017, 2020, 2021, 2022, 2026)
  - Manchester United (1957, 1958, 1976, 1979, 1995, 2005, 2007, 2018, 2023)

==== Individual ====
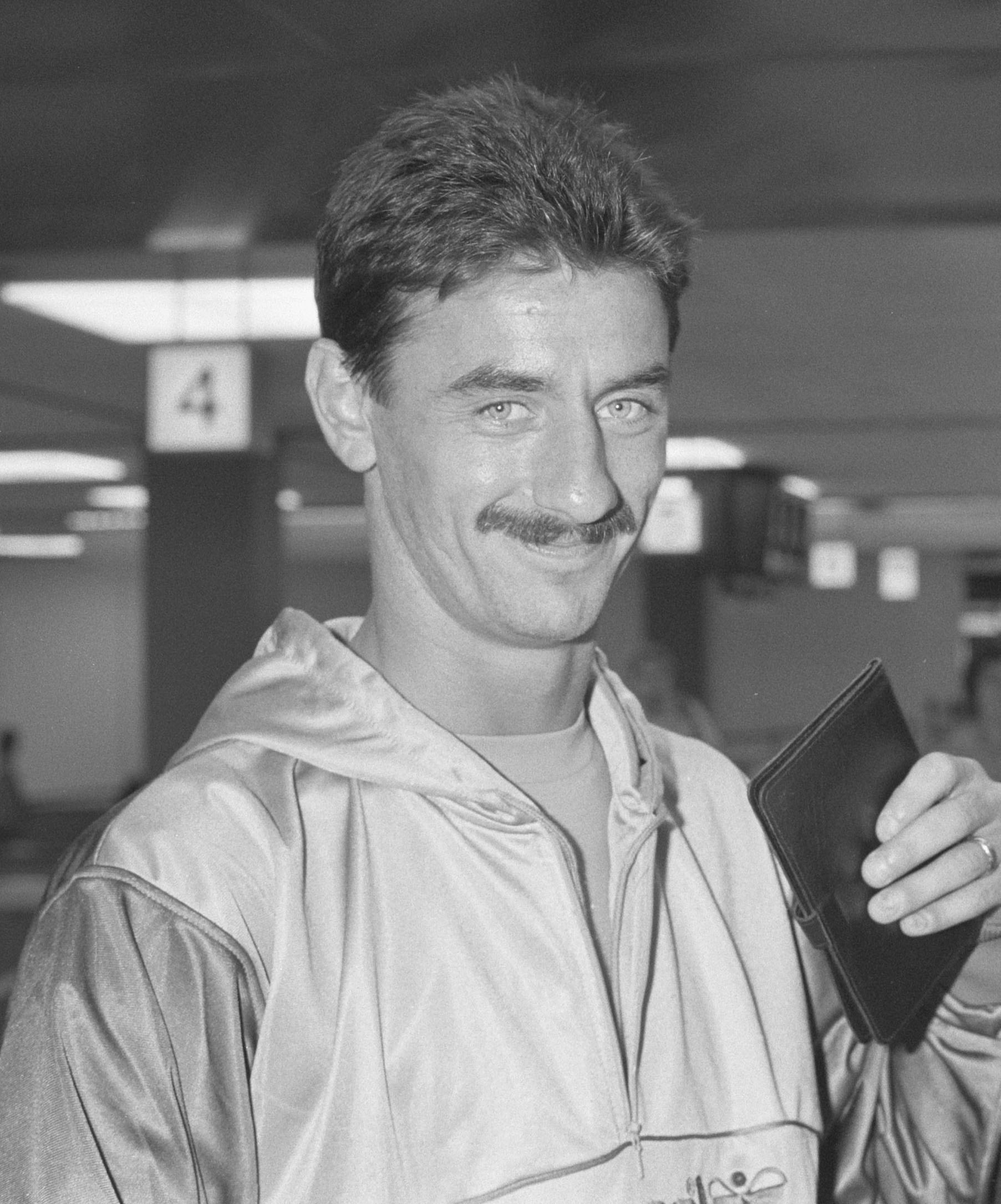
Ian Rush, the former Liverpool striker and record goalscorer in FA Cup final history

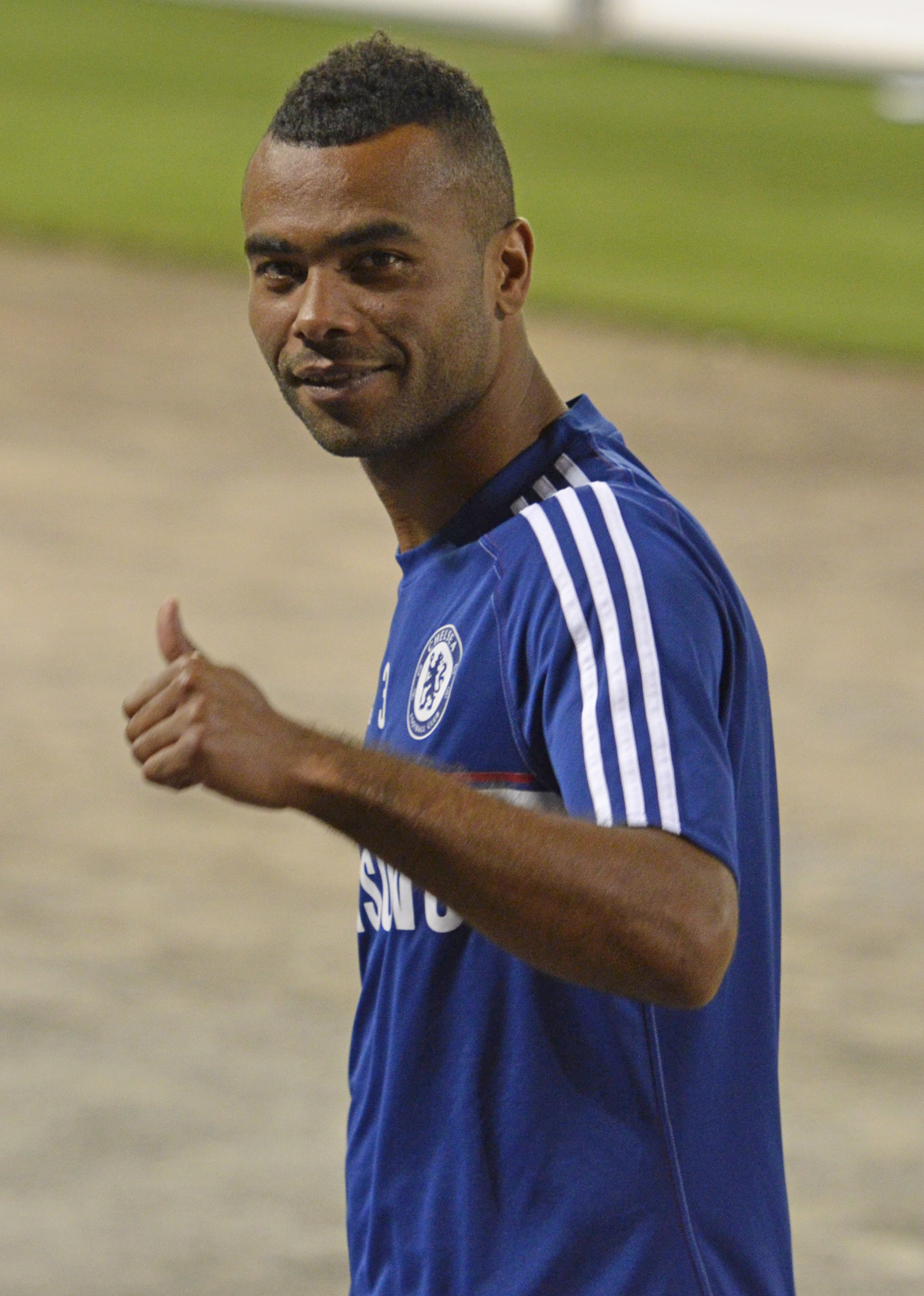
Ashley Cole won a record seven FA Cup finals

- Most wins by player: 7: Ashley Cole (Arsenal) (2002, 2003, 2005) & (Chelsea) (2007, 2009, 2010, 2012)
- Most wins by manager: 7, Arsène Wenger (Arsenal) (1998, 2002, 2003, 2005, 2014, 2015, 2017)
- Most appearances in a final: 9, Arthur Kinnaird (Wanderers) (1872–73, 1875–76, 1876–77, 1877–78) & (Old Etonians) (1874–75, 1878–79, 1880–81, 1881–82, 1882–83)
- Most goals (one final): 3:
  - Billy Townley (Blackburn Rovers) (1890)
  - James Logan (Notts County) (1894)
  - Stan Mortensen (Blackpool) (1953)
- Most goals (all finals): 5, Ian Rush (Liverpool) (2 in 1986, 2 in 1989, 1 in 1992)
- Most finals scored in: 4, Didier Drogba (Chelsea) (1 each in 2007, 2009, 2010, 2012)
- Youngest FA Cup finalist: Curtis Weston (Millwall), 17 years and 119 days (2004)
- Youngest player to score in an FA Cup final: Norman Whiteside (Manchester United), 18 years and 19 days (1983)
- Oldest player: Billy Hampson (Newcastle United), 41 years and 257 days (1924)

=== All rounds ===
- Biggest win: Preston North End 26–0 Hyde (First round, 15 October 1887)
- Biggest away win: Clapton 0–14 Nottingham Forest (First round, 17 January 1891)
- Highest attendance at Wembley: 126,047 (official) up to 300,000 (estimate) at the "White Horse Final" (Bolton Wanderers v. West Ham United, 28 April 1923)
- Most clubs competing for trophy in a season: 763 (2011–12)
- Longest tie: 660 minutes (6 matches in total), Oxford City v. Alvechurch (Fourth qualifying round, 6/9/15/17/20/22 November 1971; Alvechurch won the sixth match 1–0)
- Longest penalty shoot-out: 20 penalties each, Tunbridge Wells v. Littlehampton Town (Preliminary round replay, 31 August 2005; Tunbridge Wells won 16–15)
- Most rounds played in a season: 9, for:
  - Brighton & Hove Albion (1932–33: 1st–4th qualifying rounds, 1st–5th rounds)
  - New Brighton (1956–57: Preliminary, 1st–4th qualifying rounds, 1st–4th rounds)
  - Blyth Spartans (1977–78: 1st–4th qualifying rounds, 1st–5th rounds)
  - Harlow Town (1979–80: Preliminary, 1st–4th qualifying rounds, 1st–4th rounds)
- Most games played in a season: 13, Bideford (1973–74: one First Qualifying, two Second Qualifying, five Third Qualifying, four Fourth Qualifying and one first round)
- Fastest goal: 4 seconds, Gareth Morris (for Ashton United v. Skelmersdale United, 1st qualifying round, 17 September 2001)
- Most consecutive games without defeat: 22, Blackburn Rovers (First round, 1884 through Second round, replay, 1886. Won three FA Cups.)
- Fastest hat-trick: 2 min 20 sec, Andy Locke (for Nantwich Town v. Droylsden, Preliminary round, August 1995)
- Most appearances: 88, Ian Callaghan, Liverpool, Swansea City, Crewe Alexandra
- Most career goals: 49 Harry Cursham (for Notts County in 12 tournaments from 1877–78 to 1888–89).
- Most goals by a player in a single FA Cup season: 19, Jimmy Ross (for Preston North End, 1887–88.) (Preston outscored opponents 50–5 over 7 matches, including "Biggest win" shown above.)
- Most goals by a player in a single FA Cup game: 9, Ted MacDougall (for AFC Bournemouth in 11–0 defeat of Margate, First round proper, 20 November 1971)
- Most goals without winning: 7, joint record
  - Dulwich Hamlet 8–7 St Albans City (Fourth qualifying round replay, 22 November 1922)
  - Dulwich Hamlet 7–7 Wealdstone (Fourth qualifying round, 16 November 1929).
- Youngest player: Andy Awford, 15 years and 88 days (for Worcester City v. Boreham Wood, 3rd qualifying round, 10 October 1987).
- Youngest goalscorer: Finn Smith, 16 years and 1 day (for Newport (IOW) F.C. v. Fleet Town, Extra preliminary round, 2 August 2022).
- Youngest goalscorer (proper rounds): George Williams, 16 years and 66 days (for Milton Keynes Dons v. Nantwich Town, First round proper, 12 November 2011).
- Biggest gap between two teams in an FA Cup match: 161 difference in rank between 8th-tier Marine and Premier League Tottenham Hotspur, Third round proper, 10 January 2021.

== Cup runs and giant killings ==
The possibility of unlikely victories in the earlier rounds of the competition, where lower ranked teams beat higher placed opposition in what is known as a "giant killing", is much anticipated by the public. Such upsets are considered an integral part of the tradition and prestige of the competition, and the attention gained by giant-killing teams can be as great as that for winners of the cup. Almost every club in the League Pyramid has a fondly remembered giant-killing act in its history. It is considered particularly newsworthy when a top Premier League team suffers an upset defeat, or where the giant-killer is a non-league club, i.e. from outside The Football League.

One analysis of four years of FA Cup results showed that it was 99.85 per cent likely that at least one team would beat one from its next higher division in a given year. The probability drops to 48.8 per cent for a two-division gap, and 39.28 per cent for a three-division gap.

=== Early years ===
The Football League was founded in 1888, 16 years after the first FA Cup competition. Before its establishment as the dominant football competition in England, teams from rival leagues did make the final of the FA Cup. The Wednesday (later Sheffield Wednesday) in 1890 reached the final as a member of the Football Alliance, two years before that competition merged with the Football League. Later, with the Football League predominantly in the North and Midlands of England, leading clubs of the Southern Football League were of a level with Football League teams, and in 1901 Southern League members Tottenham Hotspur became the only non-League side to win the Cup, while fellow Southern League team Southampton were losing finalists in 1900 and 1902. In 1920–21, the Football League expanded to incorporate teams from the Southern League's first division, and the following year it added a further division consisting of leading northern and midlands clubs. This consolidated the Football League's position as the leading competition in English football, and established the hierarchy in which non-League clubs in the English football league system competing in the FA Cup would face Football League teams as clear underdogs.

=== Non-League giant killings ===
Since the expansion of the Football League in 1921, the best performance of a team from outside the Football League was National League side Lincoln City's run to the quarter-finals of the 2016–17 FA Cup, during which they defeated Championship side Brighton 3–1 in the fourth round and Premier League side Burnley 1–0 in the fifth, before falling to ultimate Cup champions Arsenal 5–0 at the Emirates. Lincoln's defeat of Burnley was only the third FA Cup victory for a non-league team over a top-flight side since 1989. Giant-killings can also be applied where the defeated team is from lower down the Football League, particularly where the defeated club is very notable or the winning team particularly obscure. Liverpool, having already won five league titles in their history, were in the Second Division in 1959 when they lost 2–1 to Worcester City of the Southern League.

The best-known non-league giant-killing came in the 1971–72 FA Cup, when non-league Hereford United defeated First Division Newcastle United. Hereford were trailing 1–0 with less than seven minutes left in the third round proper replay, when Hereford's Ronnie Radford scored the equaliser – a goal still shown regularly when FA Cup fixtures are broadcast. Hereford finished the shocking comeback by defeating Newcastle 2–1 in the match. They finished that season as runners-up of the Southern League, behind Chelmsford City, and were voted into the Football League at the expense of Barrow.

The biggest non-league giant-killing in terms of league placings came in the 2025–26 FA Cup, where National League North side Macclesfield F.C. defeated Premier League side and FA Cup defending champions Crystal Palace 2–1. Widely regarded as the biggest upset in the history of the competition, there was a league placing difference of 117 places between the two sides, dethroning Chasetown vs Port Vale, in the 2007–08 FA Cup second round replay (108 places). This was also the first time since the formation of the Premier League that a Level 6 side had defeated a side from the top division. This made Crystal Palace the first defending champions to lose against a non-league team since Wolverhampton Wanderers lost against Crystal Palace in 1909.

Some small clubs gain a reputation for being "cup specialists" after two or more giant killing feats within a few years. Yeovil Town hold the record for the most victories over league opposition as a non-league team, having recorded 20 wins through the years before they achieved promotion into The Football League in 2003. The record for a club which has never entered the Football League is held by Altrincham, with 17 wins against league teams.

=== Non-League cup runs ===
For non-League teams, reaching the third round proper – where all Level 1 sides now enter – is considered a major achievement. In the 2008–09 FA Cup, a record eight non-League teams achieved this feat. As of the 2023–24 season, only eleven non-League teams have reached the fifth round proper (last 16) since 1925, and only Lincoln City have progressed to the quarter-finals (last 8), during the 2016–17 edition of the tournament.

Chasetown, while playing at Level 8 of English football during the 2007–08 competition, were the lowest-ranked team to ever play in the third round proper (final 64, of 731 teams entered that season). Chasetown was then a member of the Southern League Division One Midlands (a lower level within the Southern Football League), when they lost to Football League Championship (Level 2) team Cardiff City, the eventual FA Cup runners-up that year. Their success earned the club over £60,000 in prize money. Marine matched this in the 2020–21 competition as a member of the Northern Premier League Division One North West, and were drawn against Premier League (Level 1) team Tottenham Hotspur, to whom they lost 5–0.

During the 2023–24 season, Maidstone United in the National League South (Level 6) had an 8–game cup run, reaching the fifth round when they won 2–1 away at EFL Championship (Level 2) side Ipswich Town. Their run ended at the fifth round after losing 5–0 away to another EFL Championship side Coventry City. They became the eleventh non–League team to reach the fifth round, and the lowest-ranked team to do so since Blyth Spartans (Level 7) in 1977–78. Maidstone's co–owner Oliver Ash stated that their cup run had earned the club 'something like £700,000 before tax'.

=== Giant killings between League clubs ===
Giant-killings can apply to matches between league clubs, particularly where teams from tier 4 have defeated tier 1 sides. In games between League sides, one of the most notable results was the 1992 victory by Wrexham, bottom of the previous season's League (avoiding relegation due to expansion of The Football League), over reigning champions Arsenal. Another similar shock was when Shrewsbury Town beat Everton 2–1 in 2003. Everton finished seventh in the Premier League and Shrewsbury Town were relegated to the Football Conference that same season.

== Winners and finalists ==
=== Results by team ===
Since its establishment, the FA Cup has been won by 45 clubs. Teams shown in italics are no longer in existence. Additionally, Queen's Park ceased to be eligible to enter the FA Cup after a Scottish Football Association ruling in 1887.

Results by team
Club	Wins	First final won	Last final won	Runners-up	Last final lost	Total final appearances
Arsenal	14	1930	2020	7	2001	21
Manchester United	13	1909	2024	9	2023	22
Chelsea	8	1970	2018	9	2026	17
Liverpool	8	1965	2022	7	2012	15
Manchester City	8	1904	2026	7	2025	15
Tottenham Hotspur	8	1901	1991	1	1987	9
Aston Villa	7	1887	1957	4	2015	11
Newcastle United	6	1910	1955	7	1999	13
Blackburn Rovers	6	1884	1928	2	1960	8
Everton	5	1906	1995	8	2009	13
West Bromwich Albion	5	1888	1968	5	1935	10
Wanderers	5	1872	1878	0	—	5
Wolverhampton Wanderers	4	1893	1960	4	1939	8
Bolton Wanderers	4	1923	1958	3	1953	7
Sheffield United	4	1899	1925	2	1936	6
Sheffield Wednesday (Note: Sheffield Wednesday's total includes two wins and one defeat under the earlier name of The Wednesday.)	3	1896	1935	3	1993	6
West Ham United	3	1964	1980	2	2006	5
Preston North End	2	1889	1938	5	1964	7
Old Etonians	2	1879	1882	4	1883	6
Portsmouth	2	1939	2008	3	2010	5
Sunderland	2	1937	1973	2	1992	4
Nottingham Forest	2	1898	1959	1	1991	3
Bury	2	1900	1903	0	—	2
Huddersfield Town	1	1922		4	1938	5
Leicester City	1	2021		4	1969	5
Oxford University	1	1874		3	1880	4
Royal Engineers	1	1875		3	1878	4
Derby County	1	1946		3	1903	4
Leeds United	1	1972		3	1973	4
Southampton	1	1976		3	2003	4
Burnley	1	1914		2	1962	3
Cardiff City	1	1927		2	2008	3
Blackpool	1	1953		2	1951	3
Crystal Palace	1	2025		2	2016	3
Clapham Rovers	1	1880		1	1879	2
Notts County	1	1894		1	1891	2
Barnsley	1	1912		1	1910	2
Charlton Athletic	1	1947		1	1946	2
Old Carthusians	1	1881		0	—	1
Blackburn Olympic	1	1883		0	—	1
Bradford City	1	1911		0	—	1
Ipswich Town	1	1978		0	—	1
Coventry City	1	1987		0	—	1
Wimbledon (Note: Wimbledon relocated to Milton Keynes in 2002 who re-named in 2004 to Milton Keynes Dons, thus de facto ceased to exist.)	1	1988		0	—	1
Wigan Athletic	1	2013		0	—	1
Queen's Park	0	—		2	1885	2
Birmingham City	0	—		2	1956	2
Watford	0	—		2	2019	2
Bristol City	0	—		1	1909	1
Luton Town	0	—		1	1959	1
Fulham	0	—		1	1975	1
Queens Park Rangers	0	—		1	1982	1
Brighton & Hove Albion	0	—		1	1983	1
Middlesbrough	0	—		1	1997	1
Millwall	0	—		1	2004	1
Stoke City	0	—		1	2011	1
Hull City	0	—		1	2014	1

=== Consecutive winners ===
Six clubs have won consecutive FA Cups, with four of them doing so on more than one occasion: Wanderers (1872, 1873 and 1876, 1877, 1878), Blackburn Rovers (1884, 1885, 1886 and 1890, 1891), Newcastle United (1951, 1952), Tottenham Hotspur (1961, 1962 and 1981, 1982), Arsenal (2002, 2003 and 2014, 2015) and Chelsea (2009, 2010).

=== Doubles/Trebles ===
Manchester City (2019) are the only club to have achieved a domestic treble of league, FA Cup and League Cup, having beaten Chelsea 4–3 on penalties in the League Cup Final, finished at the top of the Premier League, and beaten Watford 6–0 in the FA Cup Final.

Manchester United (1999) and Manchester City (2023) are the only two English teams to have won the continental treble of league, FA Cup, and Champions League. They are two of only nine European sides to do so. Liverpool won the FA Cup, League Cup and UEFA Cup in 2001 to complete a cup treble.

Eight clubs have won the FA Cup as part of a league and cup double, namely Preston North End (1889), Aston Villa (1897), Tottenham Hotspur (1961), Arsenal (1971, 1998, 2002), Liverpool (1986), Manchester United (1994, 1996, 1999), Chelsea (2010) and Manchester City (2019, 2023). In 1993, Arsenal became the first side to win both the FA Cup and the League Cup in the same season when they beat Sheffield Wednesday in both finals. Liverpool (2001, 2022), Chelsea (2007) and Manchester City (2019, 2026) have since repeated this feat. In 2012, Chelsea won both the FA Cup and the Champions League.

=== Outside England ===
The FA Cup has only been won by a non-English team once. Cardiff City achieved this in 1927 when they beat Arsenal in the final at Wembley. They had previously made it to the final only to lose to Sheffield United in 1925 and lost another final to Portsmouth in 2008. Cardiff City are also the only team to win the national cups of two countries in the same season, having also won the Welsh Cup in 1927. The Scottish team Queen's Park reached and lost the final in both 1884 and 1885.

=== Outside the top division ===
Since the creation of the Football League in 1888, the final has never been contested by two teams from outside the top division, and there have only been eight winners who were not in the top flight: Notts County (1894); Tottenham Hotspur (1901); Wolverhampton Wanderers (1908); Barnsley (1912); West Bromwich Albion (1931); Sunderland (1973), Southampton (1976) and West Ham United (1980). With the exception of Tottenham, these clubs were all playing in the second tier (the old Second Division) – Tottenham were playing in the Southern League and were only elected to the Football League in 1908, meaning they are the only non-League winners of the FA Cup since the League's creation. Other than Tottenham's victory, only 24 finalists have come from outside English football's top tier, with a record of 7 wins and 17 runners-up: and none at all from the third tier or lower, Southampton (1902, then in the Southern League) being the last finalist from outside the top two tiers.

Sunderland's win in 1973 was considered a major upset, having beaten Leeds United who finished third in the top flight that season, as was West Ham's victory over Arsenal in 1980 as the Gunners were in their third successive FA Cup Final and were the cup holders and just having finished 4th in the First Division, whereas West Ham had ended the season 7th in Division 2. This also marked the last time (as of 2023–24) a team from outside the top division won the FA Cup. Uniquely, in 2008 three of the four semi-finalists (Barnsley, Cardiff City and West Bromwich) were from outside the top division, although the eventual winner was the last remaining top-flight team, Portsmouth. West Bromwich (1931) are the only team to have won the FA Cup and earned promotion to the top flight in the same season; whereas Wigan Athletic (2013) are the only team to have won the Cup and been relegated from the top flight in the same season.

== Media coverage ==
=== Domestic broadcasters ===
The FA Cup Final is one of 10 events reserved for live broadcast on UK terrestrial television under the Ofcom Code on Sports and Other Listed and Designated Events.

In the early years of coverage the BBC had exclusive radio coverage with a picture of the pitch marked in the Radio Times with numbered squares to help the listener follow the match on the radio. The first FA Cup Final on Radio was in 1926 between Bolton Wanderers and Manchester City but this was only broadcast in Manchester, the first national final on BBC Radio was between Arsenal and Cardiff City in 1927. The first final on BBC Television was in 1937 in a match which featured Sunderland and Preston North End but this was not televised in full. The following season's final between Preston and Huddersfield Town was covered in full by the BBC. When ITV was formed in 1955 they shared final coverage with the BBC in one of the only club matches shown live on television, during the 1970s and 1980s coverage became more elaborate with BBC and ITV trying to steal viewers from the others by starting coverage earlier and earlier some starting as early as 9 a.m. which was six hours before kick off. The sharing of rights between BBC and ITV continued from 1955 to 1988, when ITV lost coverage to the BBC. From 1988 to 1997, the BBC was the exclusive broadcaster of the competition on terrestrial television and covered the competition from the third round onwards, showing one live match per round alongside highlights.

In 1990, British Satellite Broadcasting (BSB) obtained rights to the competition, and showed a live match from rounds 1 and 2. This continued to be the case after Sky took over BSB in 1991.

FA Cup Broadcasters since 1990–91
Seasons	Free-to-air	Pay-TV	Streaming (Note: Streaming services which are separate to the ones offered by the linear broadcasters)
1990–91	BBC	Sky Sports	
1996–97	ITV	Sky Sports	
2001–02	BBC	Sky Sports	
2008–09	ITV	Setanta Sports	
2009–10	ITV		FA Player
2010–11	ITV	ESPN	
2013–14	ITV	BT Sport	
2014–15	BBC	BT Sport	
2019–20	BBC	BT Sport	Facebook
2020–21	BBC	BT Sport	FA Player
2021–22	BBC/ITV		
2025–26	BBC	TNT Sports	

==== 1997 to 2001 ====
From 1997 to 2001, Sky owned the coverage showing one match per round, with the free-to-air rights sublicensed to ITV who showed an additional match from the third round onwards. The BBC continued with highlights on Match of the Day.

==== 2001 to 2008 ====
From 2001 to 2008, BBC and Sky again shared coverage with BBC having two or three matches per round and Sky having one or two.

Until the 2008–09 season, the BBC and Sky Sports shared television coverage, with the BBC showing three matches in the earlier rounds. Some analysts argued the decision to move away from the Sky and, in particular, the BBC undermined the FA Cup in the eyes of the public.

==== 2008 to 2009 ====
From 2008–09 to 2013–14, FA Cup matches were shown live by ITV across England and Wales, with UTV broadcasting to Northern Ireland. Scottish member STV refused to show them, and instead the regularly advertised programming that otherwise would mostly have been shown across the UK (new and repeated network entertainment and drama content, films, local productions etc.) would continue as normal in a delayed or exclusive fashion while the rest of the ITV network aired the football. ITV showed 16 FA Cup games per season, including the first pick of live matches from each of the first to sixth rounds of the competition, plus one semi-final exclusively live. The final was also shown live on ITV. Under the same 2008 contract, Setanta Sports showed three games and one replay in each round from round three to five, two quarter-finals, one semi-final and the final. The channel also broadcast ITV's matches, albeit with their own commentary teams, exclusively to Scotland, after STV's decision to replace the games with regular programming. Setanta entered administration in June 2009 and as a result the FA terminated Setanta's deal to broadcast FA-sanctioned competitions and England internationals.

The early rounds of the 2008–09 competition were covered for the first time by ITV's online service, ITV Local. The first match of the competition, between Wantage Town and Brading Town, was broadcast live online. Highlights of eight games of each round were broadcast as catch up on ITV Local. Since ITV Local closed, this coverage did not continue.

==== 2009 to 2010 ====
As a result of Setanta going out of business ITV showed the competition exclusively in the 2009–10 season with between three and four matches per round, all quarter finals, semi-finals and final live as the FA could not find a pay TV broadcaster in time. Many expected BSkyB to make a bid to show some of the remaining FA Cup games for the remainder of the 2009–10 season which would include a semi-final and shared rights to the final.

In October 2009, the FA announced that ITV would show an additional match in the first and second rounds on ITV, with one replay match shown on ITV4. One match and one replay match from the first two rounds were broadcast on the FA's website for free, in a similar situation to the 2010 World Cup Qualifier between Ukraine and England. The 2009–10 first-round match between Oldham Athletic and Leeds United was the first FA Cup match to be streamed online live.

==== 2010 to 2014 ====
ESPN bought the competition for the 2010–11 to 2012–13 season and during this time Rebecca Lowe became the first woman to host the FA Cup Final in the UK.

ESPN took over the package Setanta held for the FA Cup from the 2010–11 season. The 2011 final was also shown live on Sky 3D in addition to ESPN (who provided the 3D coverage for Sky 3D) and ITV. Following the sale of ESPN's UK and Ireland channels to BT, ESPN's rights package transferred to BT Sport from the 2013–14 season. STV would continue to broadcast regular programming in place of FA Cup games, live draws and highlights shows throughout this period, although it did the broadcast the 2014 final live.

==== 2014 to 2019 ====
ITV lost the rights to the FA Cup beginning with the 2014–15 FA Cup. Terrestrial rights returned to BBC Sport, with the final being shown on BBC One while BT Sport hold the pay TV rights. Under this deal, the BBC would show around the same number of games as ITV and still have the first pick for each round.

Matches involving Welsh clubs are sometimes exclusively broadcast on Welsh language channel S4C, which is also available to view across the rest of the United Kingdom on satellite and cable television, and through the channel's website. A similar arrangement is shared with BBC Cymru Wales when the corporation obtained the rights from 2014 to 2015, potentially giving the BBC an extra match per round.

==== 2019 to 2025 ====
On 23 May 2019, it was announced that ITV would replace BT Sport in broadcasting the FA Cup from the 2021–22 season. This deal saw the BBC and ITV become joint broadcasters of the tournament for the first time since 1988, which meant that, for the first time, all FA Cup matches would be exclusively broadcast on free-to-air television.

In addition, full coverage of the tournament returned to STV in Scotland, after the broadcaster replaced content from the competition with regular network programmes (and local content made in Scotland, plus films and specials) during the 2008 to 2014 period that ITV last held the rights.

BBC Radio 5 Live and Talksport provided radio coverage including several full live commentaries per round, with additional commentaries broadcast on BBC Local Radio.

==== 2025 onwards ====
On 15 February 2024, it was announced that TNT Sports obtained full broadcasting rights of the FA Cup from the 2025–26 season. The BBC confirmed a sublicensing deal with TNT Sports on 14 May 2024 to allow the competition to remain free-to-air, showing two games from the first round to the quarter-finals, one semi-final and the final, which will all be broadcast on TNT Sports also.

=== International broadcasters ===
Official broadcasters for the 2025–28 cycle

==== Americas ====
Country	Broadcasters
Brazil	ESPN
Canada	Sportsnet
Caribbean	Rush Sports
Central America and Mexico	Warner Bros. Discovery
Central America and Mexico	Fox
Dominican Republic	Warner Bros. Discovery
Puerto Rico	ESPN
United States	ESPN
South America	ESPN

==== Asia ====
Country	Broadcasters
China	Migu
China	CCTV
Hong Kong	now TV
Indian subcontinent	Sony Sports Network
Indonesia	Emtek
Iran	IRIB Varzesh
Iran	Gem Sport
Iran	Persiana Sports
Japan	U-Next
Kazakhstan	Sport+
Laos	JAS/MONOMAX
Macau	Macau Cable TV; M Plus
Malaysia	Astro Sports
Mongolia	Premier Sports Network
Myanmar	Sky Net
South Korea	Coupang Play
Singapore	StarHub
Taiwan	ELTA
Thailand	JAS/MONOMAX
Uzbekistan	Zoʻr TV
Vietnam	FPT

==== Europe ====
Country	Broadcasters
Albania	SuperSport
Andorra	Movistar Plus+
Austria	DAZN
Belgium	DAZN
Bosnia and Herzegovina	Arena Sport
Croatia	Arena Sport
Cyprus	Cytavision Sports
Czech Republic	Nova Sport
Denmark	Viaplay
Estonia	Setanta Sports
Estonia	Go3 Sport
Finland	Viaplay
France	beIN Sports
Georgia	Setanta Sports
Germany	DAZN
Greece	ERT
Hungary	Spíler TV
Iceland	Viaplay
Ireland	TNT Sports
Italy	DAZN
Kosovo	SuperSport
Latvia	Setanta Sports
Latvia	Go3 Sport
Liechtenstein	DAZN
Lithuania	Setanta Sports
Lithuania	Go3 Sport
Luxembourg	DAZN
Malta	Total Sports Network
Montenegro	Arena Sport
Netherlands	Viaplay
North Macedonia	Arena Sport
Norway	Viaplay
Norway	TV 2 Sport
Poland	TVP Sport
Portugal	Sport TV
Romania	Voyo
San Marino	DAZN
Serbia	Arena Sport
Slovakia	Nova Sport
Slovenia	Arena Sport
Spain	Movistar Plus+
Sweden	Viaplay
Switzerland	DAZN
Turkey	TRT
Ukraine	Setanta Sports

==== Middle East and North Africa ====
Country	Broadcasters
Israel	Sport 1
MENA	beIN Sports

==== Oceania ====
Country	Broadcasters
Australia	Stan Sport
New Zealand	beIN Sports
Pacific Islands	Digicel
Papua New Guinea	Digicel

==== Sub-Saharan Africa ====
Country	Broadcasters
Sub-Saharan Africa	SuperSport
Sub-Saharan Africa	Canal+ Afrique
