= List of non-League clubs in the Fifth Round of the FA Cup since 1925–26 =

Since the establishment of its current format in 1925, only 11 non-League football clubs – that is, clubs outside the divisions of the Football League and, since 1992, the Premier League – have reached the Fifth Round of the FA Cup, to become one of the last 16 clubs in the competition. To date, only Lincoln City has subsequently reached the next round, the quarter-finals (previously known as the Sixth Round).

The Football League was founded in 1888; prior to this, all teams entered the FA Cup as equals, and random byes were used where required based on the number of clubs entering. (Note: The exception to this was the second tournament, the 1872–73 FA Cup, in which the holders Wanderers were awarded a bye to the final under the original intention to operate the Cup as a challenge tournament) A qualifying tournament was introduced in 1888–89, giving priority access to the first round for leading Football League clubs, though stronger non-League teams were also given direct entry, ahead of lower-ranked Football League teams.

After the foundation of the Football League, non-League teams reached the FA Cup Final on four occasions: The Wednesday of the Football Alliance in 1889–90, Southampton of the Southern League in 1899–1900 and 1901–02, and Tottenham Hotspur of the Southern League, who became the only non-League winners in 1900–01. The Football League continued to strengthen over time, and in 1920–21 it expanded to absorb the 20 strongest Southern League teams, followed by the addition of two more southern teams and 18 leading northern non-League clubs the following year, making the eminent so-called non-League divisions by this point feeders to the Football League rather than be running parallel to it.

The reformatting of the FA Cup to six rounds before the semi-finals was introduced a few years later for the 1925–26 FA Cup. Prior to this new format, the last non-League teams to reach the last 16 were Southampton and Queens Park Rangers of the Southern League in 1914–15, after the latter had reached the quarter-finals in 1913–14.

== Teams ==
Note: Goals scored by the team involved in the cup run are shown first, irrespective of the match being home, away, or at a neutral venue.

=== 1947–48: Colchester United ===
1947–48 – Colchester United – Southern League (tier 4) (Note: Tier 4 was the highest non-League level at the time, as the Football League only had three tiers until the 1958–59 season.)
Round	Date	Against (tier)	Venue	Score
4th qualifying	15 November 1947	Chelmsford City (4)	Away	3–1
1st	29 November 1947	Banbury Spencer (5)	Home	2–1
2nd	13 December 1947	Wrexham (3)	Home	1–0
3rd	10 January 1948	Huddersfield Town (1)	Home	1–0
4th	24 January 1948	Bradford (Park Avenue) (2)	Home	3–2
5th	7 February 1948	Blackpool (1)	Away	0–5

=== 1948–49: Yeovil Town ===
1948–49 – Yeovil Town – Southern League (tier 4)
Round	Date	Against (tier)	Venue	Score
4th qualifying	13 November 1948	Lovell's Athletic (4)	Away	3–2
1st	27 November 1948	Romford (4)	Home	4–0
2nd	11 December 1948	Weymouth (4)	Away	4–0
3rd	8 January 1949	Bury (2)	Home	3–1
4th	29 January 1949	Sunderland (1)	Home	2–1
5th	12 February 1949	Manchester United (1)	Away	0–8

=== 1977–78: Blyth Spartans ===
1977–78 – Blyth Spartans – Northern League (tier 7)
Round	Date	Against (tier)	Venue	Score
1st qualifying	17 September 1977	Shildon (7)	Away	3–0
2nd qualifying	8 October 1977	Crook Town (7)	Away	1–1
2nd qualifying (replay)	12 October 1977	Crook Town (7)	Home	3–0
3rd qualifying	22 October 1977	Consett (7)	Away	4–1
4th qualifying	5 November 1977	Bishop Auckland (7)	Away	1–0
1st	26 November 1977	Burscough (7)	Home	1–0
2nd	17 December 1977	Chesterfield (3)	Home	1–0
3rd	7 January 1978	Enfield (5)	Home	1–0
4th	6 February 1978	Stoke City (2)	Away	3–2
5th	18 February 1978	Wrexham (3)	Away	1–1
5th (replay)	27 February 1978	Wrexham (3)	Home	1–2

=== 1984–85: Telford United ===
1984–85 – Telford United – Alliance Premier League (tier 5)
Round	Date	Against (tier)	Venue	Score
1st	17 November 1984	Lincoln City (3)	Away	1–1
1st (replay)	20 November 1984	Lincoln City (3)	Home	2–1
2nd	8 December 1984	Preston North End (3)	Away	4–1
3rd	5 January 1985	Bradford City (3)	Home	2–1
4th	29 January 1985	Darlington (4)	Away	1–1
4th (replay)	4 February 1985	Darlington (4)	Home	3–0
5th	16 February 1985	Everton (1)	Away	0–3

=== 1993–94: Kidderminster Harriers ===
1993–94 – Kidderminster Harriers – Football Conference (tier 5)
Round	Date	Against (tier)	Venue	Score
4th qualifying	23 October 1993	Chesham United (6)	Away	4–1
1st	13 November 1993	Kettering Town (5)	Home	3–0
2nd	4 December 1993	Woking (5)	Home	1–0
3rd	8 January 1994	Birmingham City (2)	Away	2–1
4th	29 January 1994	Preston North End (4)	Home	1–0
5th	19 February 1994	West Ham United (1)	Home	0–1

=== 2010–11: Crawley Town ===
2010–11 – Crawley Town – Conference Premier (tier 5)
Round	Date	Against (tier)	Venue	Score
4th qualifying	23 October 2010	Newport County (5)	Away	1–0
1st	6 November 2010	Guiseley (6)	Away	5–0
2nd	26 November 2010	Swindon Town (3)	Home	1–1
2nd (replay)	7 December 2010	Swindon Town (3)	Away	3–2
3rd	10 January 2011	Derby County (2)	Home	2–1
4th	29 January 2011	Torquay United (4)	Away	1–0
5th	19 February 2011	Manchester United (1)	Away	0–1

=== 2012–13: Luton Town ===
2012–13 – Luton Town – Conference Premier (tier 5)
Round	Date	Against (tier)	Venue	Score
4th qualifying	20 October 2012	Cambridge United (5)	Away	2–0
1st	3 November 2012	Nuneaton Town (5)	Home	1–1
1st (replay)	13 November 2012	Nuneaton Town (5)	Away	2–0
2nd	1 December 2012	Dorchester Town (6)	Home	2–1
3rd	5 January 2013	Wolverhampton Wanderers (2)	Home	1–0
4th	26 January 2013	Norwich City (1)	Away	1–0
5th	16 February 2013	Millwall (2)	Home	0–3

=== 2016–17: Lincoln City ===
To date, Lincoln City remains the only non-League side to have progressed past the fifth round to the quarter-finals, in the current format. Prior to this, the last non–League side to reach the quarter finals were Queens Park Rangers in 1913–14, before the current format was introduced.

2016–17 – Lincoln City – National League (tier 5)
Round	Date	Against (tier)	Venue	Score
4th qualifying	15 October 2016	Guiseley (5)	Home	0–0
4th qualifying (replay)	18 October 2016	Guiseley (5)	Away	2–1
1st	5 November 2016	Altrincham (6)	Home	2–1
2nd	5 December 2016	Oldham Athletic (3)	Home	3–2
3rd	7 January 2017	Ipswich Town (2)	Away	2–2
3rd (replay)	17 January 2017	Ipswich Town (2)	Home	1–0
4th	28 January 2017	Brighton & Hove Albion (2)	Home	3–1
5th	18 February 2017	Burnley (1)	Away	1–0
Quarter-finals	11 March 2017	Arsenal (1)	Away	0–5

=== 2016–17: Sutton United ===
2016–17 – Sutton United – National League (tier 5)
Round	Date	Against (tier)	Venue	Score
4th qualifying	15 October 2016	Forest Green Rovers (5)	Home	2–1
1st	5 November 2016	Dartford (6)	Away	6–3
2nd	3 December 2016	Cheltenham Town (4)	Home	2–1
3rd	7 January 2017	AFC Wimbledon (3)	Home	0–0
3rd (replay)	17 January 2017	AFC Wimbledon (3)	Away	3–1
4th	29 January 2017	Leeds United (2)	Home	1–0
5th	20 February 2017	Arsenal (1)	Home	0–2

=== 2021–22: Boreham Wood ===
2021–22 – Boreham Wood – National League (tier 5)
Round	Date	Against (tier)	Venue	Score
4th qualifying	16 October 2021	Barnet (5)	Away	1–0
1st	6 November 2021	Eastleigh (5)	Home	2–0
2nd	6 December 2021	St Albans City (6)	Home	4–0
3rd	8 January 2022	AFC Wimbledon (3)	Home	2–0
4th	6 February 2022	Bournemouth (2)	Away	1–0
5th	3 March 2022	Everton (1)	Away	0–2

=== 2023–24: Maidstone United ===
2023–24 – Maidstone United – National League South (tier 6)
Round	Date	Against (tier)	Venue	Score
2nd qualifying	16 September 2023	Steyning Town (9)	Away	4–1
3rd qualifying	30 September 2023	Winchester City (7)	Away	2–0
4th qualifying	14 October 2023	Torquay United (6)	Away	2–0
1st	4 November 2023	Chesham United (7)	Away	2–0
2nd	2 December 2023	Barrow (4)	Home	2–1
3rd	6 January 2024	Stevenage (3)	Home	1–0
4th	27 January 2024	Ipswich Town (2)	Away	2–1
5th	26 February 2024	Coventry City (2)	Away	0–5
