= 1971–72 FA Cup qualifying rounds =

Tournament details
- Country: England; Wales

The FA Cup 1971–72 is the 91st season of the world's oldest football knockout competition; The Football Association Challenge Cup, or FA Cup for short. The large number of clubs entering the tournament from lower down the English football league system meant that the competition started with a number of preliminary and qualifying rounds. The 28 victorious teams from the fourth round qualifying progressed to the first round proper.

== Preliminary round ==
=== Ties ===
Tie	Home team	Score	Away team
1	Bridlington Town	2–1	Bridlington Trinity
2	Brierley Hill Alliance	0–2	Bromsgrove Rovers
3	Chippenham Town	1–0	Frome Town
4	Desborough Town	1–2	Irthlingborough Diamonds
5	Ellesmere Port Town	2–1	Formby
6	Frickley Colliery	3–2	Mexborough Town
7	Gosport Borough	0–0	Newport I O W
8	Harwich & Parkeston	2–2	Lowestoft Town
9	Hertford Town	1–1	Leytonstone
10	Histon	4–2	Rothwell Town
11	Hornchurch	1–4	Metropolitan Police
12	Hyde United	2–2	Kirkby Town
13	Ilford	2–3	Staines Town
14	Kidderminster Harriers	3–1	Lye Town
15	Kingstonian	4–1	Leighton Town
16	Lincoln United	1–0	Louth United
17	Llanelli	0–3	Merthyr Tydfil
18	March Town United	1–2	Skegness Town
19	Minehead	1–2	Poole Town
20	New Mills	3–1	Sandbach Ramblers
21	Ramsgate Athletic	1–1	Sittingbourne
22	Romford	3–0	St Albans City

=== Replays ===
Tie	Home team	Score	Away team
7	Newport I O W	4–0	Gosport Borough
8	Lowestoft Town	1–2	Harwich & Parkeston
9	Leytonstone	2–1	Hertford Town
12	Kirkby Town	1–2	Hyde United
21	Sittingbourne	0–1	Ramsgate Athletic

== 1st qualifying round ==
=== Ties ===
Tie	Home team	Score	Away team
1	Abergavenny Thursdays	1–0	Barry Town
2	Alfreton Town	4–0	Bilston
3	Alton Town	3–2	Cowes
4	Altrincham	1–0	Buxton
5	Alvechurch	4–0	Moor Green
6	Annfield Plain	0–5	Durham City
7	Arnold	2–0	Brigg Town
8	Arundel	1–0	Bognor Regis Town
9	Ashford Town (Kent)	2–0	Bexhill Town
10	Ashton United	2–1	Clitheroe
11	Atherstone Town	3–1	Bromsgrove Rovers
12	Aveley	1–0	Banstead Athletic
13	Bacup Borough	0–0	Fleetwood
14	Banbury United	2–2	Bedford Town
15	Barking	0–1	Bishop's Stortford
16	Barnstaple Town	1–3	Bideford
17	Barton Town	1–0	Bridlington Town
18	Basingstoke Town	2–1	Welton Rovers
19	Bath City	2–1	Chippenham Town
20	Bedlington Colliery Welfare	5–1	Ryhope Colliery Welfare
21	Belper Town	0–0	Burton Albion
22	Bexley United	2–1	Clapton
23	Biggleswade & District	2–1	Rushden Town
24	Billingham Synthonia	0–2	Ferryhill Athletic
25	Bishop Auckland	4–1	Stanley United
26	Blyth Spartans	3–2	Boldon Colliery Welfare
27	Boreham Wood	2–1	Cheshunt
28	Boston	1–5	Bourne Town
29	Braintree & Crittall Athletic	2–1	Chertsey Town
30	Bridgwater Town	1–0	Bridport
31	Bury Town	2–0	Clacton Town
32	Canterbury City	5–1	Chatham Town
33	Carshalton Athletic	2–1	Chesham United
34	Chatteris Town	3–0	Soham Town Rangers
35	Chichester City	3–1	Haywards Heath
36	Chorley	3–0	Marine
37	Cinderford Town	1–1	Ton Pentre
38	Civil Service	0–10	Bromley
39	Corby Town	0–1	Irthlingborough Diamonds
40	Corinthian Casuals	0–2	Harlow Town
41	Crawley Town	4–0	Eastbourne Town
42	Cray Wanderers	3–0	Ware
43	Crook Town	1–4	Consett
44	Darlaston	2–1	Warley
45	Dartford	1–1	Walton & Hersham
46	Deal Town	1–1	Tonbridge
47	Denaby United	3–0	Emley
48	Dorchester Town	3–2	Taunton Town
49	Dover	2–1	Ramsgate Athletic
50	Droylsden	0–3	Ellesmere Port Town
51	Dudley Town	0–1	Worcester City
52	Dulwich Hamlet	1–0	Dunstable Town
53	East Grinstead	2–0	Ringmer
54	Eastbourne United	0–2	Burgess Hill Town
55	Eastwood Hanley	1–0	Winsford United
56	Eastwood Town	2–2	Retford Town
57	Ely City	4–0	Histon
58	Erith & Belvedere	2–2	Leatherhead
59	Falmouth Town	3–2	Truro City
60	Fareham Town	8–2	Selsey
61	Farsley Celtic	0–1	Frickley Colliery
62	Feltham	1–3	Redhill
63	Finchley	0–1	Stevenage Athletic
64	Fleet Town	1–1	Newport I O W
65	Folkestone	6–2	Sheppey United
66	Ford United	1–4	Staines Town
67	Gainsborough Trinity	2–3	Lincoln United
68	Gateshead	3–0	Tow Law Town
69	Glastonbury	2–1	Poole Town
70	Glossop	0–1	Worksop Town
71	Gloucester City	2–3	Merthyr Tydfil
72	Goole Town	3–0	Selby Town
73	Gorleston	0–3	Sudbury Town
74	Gravesend & Northfleet	2–2	Southall
75	Grays Athletic	2–4	Sutton United
76	Great Harwood	7–1	Prescot Town
77	Great Yarmouth Town	1–3	Harwich & Parkeston
78	Gresley Rovers	0–4	Stafford Rangers
79	Guildford City	2–0	Aylesbury United
80	Hampton	2–1	Bletchley Town
81	Harrow Borough	0–1	Wealdstone
82	Hastings United	1–1	Southwick
83	Hatfield Town	0–4	Leytonstone
84	Hayes	2–0	Kingstonian
85	Heanor Town	1–0	Newhall United
86	Hednesford Town	0–2	Redditch United
87	Hemel Hempstead	2–2	Addlestone
88	Herne Bay	3–1	Faversham Town
89	Highgate United	3–1	Kidderminster Harriers
90	Hitchin Town	2–2	Tilbury
91	Hoddesdon Town	2–1	Metropolitan Police
92	Holbeach United	1–4	Stamford
93	Horsham	2–0	Lewes
94	Horwich R M I	1–1	Hyde United
95	Hounslow	0–2	Uxbridge
96	Hull Brunswick	1–3	Whitby Town
97	Ilkeston Town	1–2	Bedworth United
98	Kettering Town	6–1	Cambridge City
99	King's Lynn	4–1	Skegness Town
100	Lancaster City	6–1	Penrith
101	Letchworth Town	1–2	Romford
102	Leyland Motors	1–4	Ormskirk
103	Littlehampton Town	0–1	Worthing
104	Lockheed Leamington	2–1	Stourbridge
105	Long Eaton United	3–1	Sutton Coldfield Town
106	Loughborough United	0–5	Nuneaton Borough
107	Lower Gornal Athletic	2–2	Halesowen Town
108	Maidenhead United	2–0	Wycombe Wanderers
109	Maidstone United	6–1	Tunbridge Wells
110	Marlow	0–3	Wembley
111	Matlock Town	1–3	Sutton Town
112	Melksham Town	1–3	Andover
113	Morecambe	2–0	Accrington Stanley
114	Mossley	2–2	Prestwich Heys
115	Nantwich	3–1	New Mills
116	Netherfield	2–4	Rossendale United
117	Newmarket Town	1–4	Thetford Town
118	Norton Woodseats	0–3	Winterton Rangers
119	Oswestry Town	2–1	Porthmadog
120	Potton United	0–1	Witney Town
121	Pwllheli & District	0–3	Connah's Quay Nomads
122	Radcliffe Borough	2–3	Burscough
123	Rawmarsh Welfare	1–1	Yorkshire Amateur
124	Runcorn	2–0	New Brighton
125	Ryde Sports	1–4	Thornycroft Athletic
126	Salisbury	4–0	Westbury United
127	Saltash United	2–3	Wadebridge Town
128	Scarborough	6–0	Ashby Institute
129	Shildon	1–1	Evenwood Town
130	Slough Town	1–1	Woking
131	Snowdown Colliery Welfare	1–4	Whitstable Town
132	South Liverpool	1–0	Northwich Victoria
133	Spalding United	0–1	Wisbech Town
134	Spennymoor United	4–2	Horden Colliery Welfare
135	St Blazey	4–0	Newquay
136	St Neots Town	1–3	Wellingborough Town
137	Stalybridge Celtic	0–1	Witton Albion
138	Stockton	2–2	Whitley Bay
139	Stonehouse	4–2	Weston Super Mare
140	Tooting & Mitcham United	1–1	Windsor & Eton
141	Trowbridge Town	4–2	Street
142	Walthamstow Avenue	1–0	Woodford Town
143	Washington	1–1	Willington
144	Wingate (Durham)	0–1	North Shields

=== Replays ===
Tie	Home team	Score	Away team
13	Fleetwood	3–0	Bacup Borough
14	Bedford Town	1–0	Banbury United
21	Burton Albion	2–0	Belper Town
37	Ton Pentre	3–1	Cinderford Town
45	Walton & Hersham	1–0	Dartford
46	Tonbridge	2–0	Deal Town
56	Retford Town	0–3	Eastwood Town
58	Leatherhead	3–0	Erith & Belvedere
64	Newport I O W	5–2	Fleet Town
74	Southall	3–1	Gravesend & Northfleet
82	Southwick	1–1	Hastings United
87	Addlestone	1–1	Hemel Hempstead
90	Tilbury	3–2	Hitchin Town
94	Hyde United	2–0	Horwich R M I
107	Halesowen Town	1–3	Lower Gornal Athletic
114	Prestwich Heys	1–2	Mossley
123	Yorkshire Amateur	4–2	Rawmarsh Welfare
129	Evenwood Town	4–3	Shildon
130	Woking	0–2	Slough Town
138	Whitley Bay	5–2	Stockton
140	Windsor & Eton	2–0	Tooting & Mitcham United
143	Willington	1–0	Washington

=== 2nd replay ===
Tie	Home team	Score	Away team
82	Hastings United	2–1	Southwick
87	Hemel Hempstead	1–4	Addlestone

== 2nd qualifying round ==
=== Ties ===
Tie	Home team	Score	Away team
1	Abergavenny Thursdays	0–2	Ton Pentre
2	Alfreton Town	3–1	Heanor Town
3	Alton Town	0–1	Fareham Town
4	Altrincham	4–1	Eastwood Hanley
5	Andover	1–3	Basingstoke Town
6	Arnold	2–4	Eastwood Town
7	Arundel	0–0	Chichester City
8	Ashford Town (Kent)	3–1	Tonbridge
9	Ashton United	3–2	Great Harwood
10	Aveley	1–1	Southall
11	Bedford Town	3–0	Biggleswade & District
12	Bedlington Colliery Welfare	0–0	Consett
13	Bexley United	3–2	Leatherhead
14	Bideford	3–1	Falmouth Town
15	Bishop's Stortford	4–2	Harlow Town
16	Blyth Spartans	3–1	Willington
17	Boreham Wood	1–1	Wealdstone
18	Bourne Town	3–1	Stamford
19	Braintree & Crittall Athletic	1–0	Cray Wanderers
20	Bridgwater Town	1–0	Dorchester Town
21	Bromley	1–1	Stevenage Athletic
22	Burscough	2–1	Chorley
23	Burton Albion	1–2	Stafford Rangers
24	Bury Town	2–0	Sudbury Town
25	Canterbury City	1–3	Folkestone
26	Carshalton Athletic	0–0	Walton & Hersham
27	Crawley Town	3–0	East Grinstead
28	Darlaston	0–4	Alvechurch
29	Denaby United	1–2	Worksop Town
30	Dulwich Hamlet	0–1	Redhill
31	Durham City	2–0	Spennymoor United
32	Fleetwood	0–2	Lancaster City
33	Gateshead	3–2	Bishop Auckland
34	Goole Town	3–2	Barton Town
35	Hampton	1–1	Guildford City
36	Hastings United	4–1	Burgess Hill Town
37	Kettering Town	2–0	Chatteris Town
38	Lockheed Leamington	0–2	Highgate United
39	Lower Gornal Athletic	0–0	Redditch United
40	Maidenhead United	1–0	Leytonstone
41	Maidstone United	3–0	Herne Bay
42	Mossley	0–0	Hyde United
43	North Shields	3–1	Ferryhill Athletic
44	Nuneaton Borough	2–0	Long Eaton United
45	Ormskirk	0–1	Ellesmere Port Town
46	Oswestry Town	3–1	Connah's Quay Nomads
47	Rossendale United	2–2	Morecambe
48	Salisbury	2–1	Bath City
49	Slough Town	0–1	Romford
50	South Liverpool	1–0	Runcorn
51	Stonehouse	0–2	Merthyr Tydfil
52	Sutton Town	2–2	Bedworth United
53	Thetford Town	0–0	Harwich & Parkeston
54	Thornycroft Athletic	4–1	Newport I O W
55	Tilbury	3–0	Addlestone
56	Trowbridge Town	0–0	Glastonbury
57	Uxbridge	1–3	Sutton United
58	Wadebridge Town	6–1	St Blazey
59	Walthamstow Avenue	2–0	Hoddesdon Town
60	Wellingborough Town	4–2	Ely City
61	Wembley	1–6	Hayes
62	Whitby Town	0–2	Scarborough
63	Whitley Bay	3–1	Evenwood Town
64	Whitstable Town	0–5	Dover
65	Windsor & Eton	2–1	Staines Town
66	Winterton Rangers	3–1	Lincoln United
67	Wisbech Town	0–4	King's Lynn
68	Witney Town	3–0	Irthlingborough Diamonds
69	Witton Albion	0–1	Nantwich
70	Worcester City	0–0	Atherstone Town
71	Worthing	1–3	Horsham
72	Yorkshire Amateur	0–0	Frickley Colliery

=== Replays ===
Tie	Home team	Score	Away team
7	Chichester City	1–1	Arundel
10	Southall	3–3	Aveley
12	Consett	4–1	Bedlington Colliery Welfare
17	Wealdstone	0–2	Boreham Wood
21	Stevenage Athletic	2–4	Bromley
26	Walton & Hersham	5–1	Carshalton Athletic
35	Guildford City	2–1	Hampton
39	Redditch United	3–1	Lower Gornal Athletic
42	Hyde United	2–0	Mossley
47	Morecambe	0–1	Rossendale United
52	Bedworth United	0–1	Sutton Town
53	Harwich & Parkeston	1–0	Thetford Town
56	Glastonbury	0–5	Trowbridge Town
70	Atherstone Town	1–0	Worcester City
72	Frickley Colliery	3–1	Yorkshire Amateur

=== 2nd replays ===
Tie	Home team	Score	Away team
7	Arundel	2–7	Chichester City
10	Aveley	2–1	Southall

== 3rd qualifying round ==
=== Ties ===
Tie	Home team	Score	Away team
1	Alfreton Town	0–4	Nuneaton Borough
2	Altrincham	1–1	Nantwich
3	Alvechurch	3–0	Atherstone Town
4	Ashford Town (Kent)	0–2	Dover
5	Ashton United	2–2	Hyde United
6	Aveley	1–1	Maidenhead United
7	Basingstoke Town	5–2	Salisbury
8	Bedford Town	2–2	Witney Town
9	Bexley United	1–1	Tilbury
10	Bideford	4–1	Wadebridge Town
11	Bishop's Stortford	2–2	Guildford City
12	Blyth Spartans	8–1	Consett
13	Boreham Wood	2–2	Walthamstow Avenue
14	Bourne Town	0–3	King's Lynn
15	Braintree & Crittall Athletic	0–2	Romford
16	Bridgwater Town	2–1	Trowbridge Town
17	Bromley	3–0	Hayes
18	Burscough	0–1	Ellesmere Port Town
19	Bury Town	1–0	Harwich & Parkeston
20	Chichester City	1–1	Hastings United
21	Crawley Town	3–1	Horsham
22	Eastwood Town	1–2	Winterton Rangers
23	Fareham Town	5–1	Thornycroft Athletic
24	Folkestone	2–0	Maidstone United
25	Gateshead	0–1	North Shields
26	Kettering Town	2–1	Wellingborough Town
27	Lancaster City	1–4	Rossendale United
28	Oswestry Town	2–0	South Liverpool
29	Redditch United	3–0	Highgate United
30	Redhill	0–2	Sutton United
31	Scarborough	2–0	Goole Town
32	Stafford Rangers	2–0	Sutton Town
33	Ton Pentre	2–1	Merthyr Tydfil
34	Walton & Hersham	2–2	Windsor & Eton
35	Whitley Bay	3–1	Durham City
36	Worksop Town	1–1	Frickley Colliery

=== Replays ===
Tie	Home team	Score	Away team
2	Nantwich	1–4	Altrincham
5	Hyde United	3–1	Ashton United
6	Maidenhead United	3–2	Aveley
8	Witney Town	2–0	Bedford Town
9	Tilbury	2–1	Bexley United
11	Guildford City	1–1	Bishop's Stortford
13	Walthamstow Avenue	2–1	Boreham Wood
20	Hastings United	9–1	Chichester City
34	Windsor & Eton	0–1	Walton & Hersham
36	Frickley Colliery	3–1	Worksop Town

=== 2nd replay ===
Tie	Home team	Score	Away team
11	Bishop's Stortford	1–2	Guildford City

== 4th qualifying round ==
The teams that given byes to this round are Macclesfield Town, Enfield, Bradford Park Avenue, Wimbledon, Yeovil Town, Hereford United, South Shields, Chelmsford City, Weymouth, Grantham, Oxford City, Barnet, Margate, Bangor City, Cheltenham Town, Wigan Athletic, Tamworth, Boston United, Hendon and Rhyl.

=== Ties ===
Tie	Home team	Score	Away team
1	Alvechurch	2–2	Oxford City
2	Basingstoke Town	2–2	Fareham Town
3	Bradford Park Avenue	0–1	South Shields
4	Bridgwater Town	2–0	Yeovil Town
5	Bromley	0–1	Guildford City
6	Bury Town	1–3	King's Lynn
7	Folkestone	0–2	Romford
8	Frickley Colliery	3–0	Grantham
9	Hastings United	0–0	Crawley Town
10	Hendon	2–2	Barnet
11	Hereford United	3–0	Cheltenham Town
12	Hyde United	1–3	Bangor City
13	Kettering Town	4–1	Chelmsford City
14	Macclesfield Town	1–2	Ellesmere Port Town
15	Maidenhead United	2–1	Walton & Hersham
16	Margate	1–0	Wimbledon
17	Nuneaton Borough	3–1	Tamworth
18	Oswestry Town	0–3	Altrincham
19	Redditch United	3–0	Ton Pentre
20	Rossendale United	6–3	Stafford Rangers
21	Scarborough	1–0	North Shields
22	Sutton United	0–1	Witney Town
23	Tilbury	0–1	Enfield
24	Walthamstow Avenue	0–0	Dover
25	Weymouth	3–1	Bideford
26	Whitley Bay	1–1	Blyth Spartans
27	Wigan Athletic	2–1	Rhyl
28	Winterton Rangers	0–3	Boston United

=== Replays ===
Tie	Home team	Score	Away team
1	Oxford City	1–1	Alvechurch
2	Fareham Town	1–1	Basingstoke Town
9	Crawley Town	3–2	Hastings United
10	Barnet	2–0	Hendon
24	Dover	1–0	Walthamstow Avenue
26	Blyth Spartans	2–1	Whitley Bay

=== 2nd replays ===
Tie	Home team	Score	Away team
1	Alvechurch	1–1	Oxford City
2	Basingstoke Town	2–1	Fareham Town

=== 3rd replay ===
Tie	Home team	Score	Away team
1	Oxford City	0–0	Alvechurch

=== 4th replay ===
Tie	Home team	Score	Away team
1	Oxford City	0–0	Alvechurch

=== 5th replay ===
Tie	Home team	Score	Away team
1	Oxford City	0–1	Alvechurch

- Oxford City and Alvechurch set the record for the longest FA Cup tie–six matches totalling 660 minutes. Alvechurch's Graham Allner played every minute of all six matches. This record will never be broken, since in 1991 the Football Association decided that ties would be decided by a penalty shoot-out if no winner had been found after a single replay.

== 1971–72 FA Cup ==
See 1971–72 FA Cup for details of the rounds from the first round proper onwards.
