= 1987–88 FA Cup qualifying rounds =

Tournament details
- Country: England; Wales

The FA Cup 1987-88 is the 107th season of the world's oldest football knockout competition; The Football Association Challenge Cup, or FA Cup for short. The large number of clubs entering the tournament from lower down the English football league system meant that the competition started with a number of preliminary and qualifying rounds. The 28 victorious teams from the fourth round qualifying progressed to the first round proper.

== Preliminary round ==
=== Ties ===
Tie	Home team	Score	Away team
1	Abingdon United	1-1	Oxford City
2	Alfreton Town	3-0	Formby
3	Alnwick Town	1-1	Durham City
4	Annfield Plain	0-4	West Auckland Town
5	Arnold	1-0	Hednesford Town
6	Ashington	3-1	Guiseley
7	Ashton United	2-0	Kirkby Town
8	Baker Perkins	2-2	Rushall Olympic
9	Baldock Town	1-0	Hampton
10	Banbury United	3-0	Edgware
11	Basildon United	1-3	Cray Wanderers
12	Beckenham Town	2-2	Hailsham Town
13	Bourne Town	1-4	Milton Keynes Borough
14	Bracknell Town	1-0	Peacehaven & Telscombe
15	Bridgend Town	1-3	Weston super Mare
16	Bridlington Town	1-0	Accrington Stanley
17	Brigg Town	4-0	Oakham United
18	Burscough	1-2	Warrington Town
19	Chalfont St Peter	1-1	Arlesey Town
20	Chasetown	0-2	Evesham United
21	Chatham Town	4-1	Collier Row
22	Clitheroe	4-0	Bridlington Trinity
23	Colwyn Bay	3-0	Winsford United
24	Corinthian-Casuals	1-1	Camberley Town
25	Coventry Sporting	2-1	Barton Rovers
26	Crook Town	2-1	Bedlington Terriers
27	Darenth Heathside	2-1	Leartherhead
28	Devizes Town	0-0	Paulton Rovers
29	Droylsden	4-2	Belper Town
30	Dudley Town	1-1	Rothwell Town
31	Eastleigh	1-1	Swanage Town & Herston
32	Egham Town	1-1	Portfield
33	Epsom & Ewell	4-0	Arundel
34	Erith & Belvedere	0-0	Wivenhoe Town
35	Evenwood Town	0-2	Leyland Motors
36	Faversham Town	1-1	Shoreham
37	Felixstowe Town	1-2	Walthamstow Avenue
38	Feltham	5-0	Alma Swanley
39	Ferryhill Athletic	3-0	Langley Park Welfare
40	Finchley	1-0	Kempston Rovers
41	Flackwell Heath	0-3	Crockenhill
42	Frome Town	1-0	Poole Town
43	Glossop	2-3	Heanor Town
44	Gloucester City	7-0	Westbury United
45	Gorleston	1-0	Chesham United
46	Grantham	2-2	Chatteris Town
47	Great Yarmouth Town	0-0	Tilbury
48	Guisborough Town	2-0	Armthorpe Welfare
49	Harrogate Town	2-1	Esh Winning
50	Hastings Town	0-1	Lancing
51	Haywards Heath	4-0	Steyning Town
52	Hertford Town	1-1	Potton United
53	Heybridge Swifts	1-1	Dorking
54	Highgate United	1-1	Bilston Town
55	Hinckley Town	2-1	Bridgnorth Town
56	Hoddesdon Town	2-0	Southall
57	Holbeach United	1-4	Walsall Wood
58	Hornchurch	7-0	Horsham Y M C A
59	Horsham	0-0	Whitehawk
60	Hungerford Town	1-1	Yate Town
61	Lancaster City	0-4	Darwen
62	Leek Town	3-3	G K N Sankey
63	Llanelli	1-2	Barnstaple Town
64	Long Eaton United	1-3	Sutton Town
65	Lowestoft Town	0-1	Kingsbury Town
66	Maidenhead United	1-1	Tunbridge Wells
67	Melksham Town	2-0	Andover
68	Moor Green	3-1	Tividale
69	Newbury Town	2-2	Welton Rovers
70	Newmarket Town	0-3	Dunstable
71	Northampton Spencer	2-5	Atherstone United
72	Norton & Stockton Ancients	4-5	Farsley Celtic
73	Oldswinford	0-1	Racing Club Warwick
74	Ossett Albion	1-1	Chester-le-Street Town
75	Ottery St Mary	1-0	Chippenham Town
76	Penrith	7-0	Horden Colliery Welfare
77	Peterlee Newtown	1-3	Denaby United
78	Petersfield United	1-1	Wick
79	Radcliffe Borough	1-0	Skelmersdale United
80	Rainham Town	1-1	Sittingbourne
81	Ringmer	1-5	Eastbourne United
82	Rossendale United	3-0	Northallerton Town
83	Salisbury	0-1	Barry Town
84	Seaham Red Star	2-0	Shildon
85	Sheppey United	1-3	Metropolitan Police
86	Shortwood United	1-6	Waterlooville
87	Shotton Comrades	2-1	Garforth Town
88	Soham Town Rangers	0-0	Hemel Hempstead
89	St Blazey	4-4	Tiverton Town
90	St Helens Town	6-2	Curzon Ashton
91	Staines Town	0-0	Ware
92	Stalybridge Celtic	2-0	Congleton Town
93	Stamford	0-0	Vauxhall Motors (Luton)
94	Sudbury Town	1-1	Hounslow
95	Tamworth	3-2	Gresley Rovers
96	Taunton Town	2-0	Clandown
97	Thanet United	3-0	Canterbury City
98	Thatcham Town	0-3	Worthing
99	Three Bridges	0-0	Gravesend & Northfleet
100	Tiptree United	0-4	Aveley
101	Tonbridge A F C	5-2	Folkestone
102	Torrington	3-0	Glastonbury
103	Tring Town	0-2	Harlow Town
104	Uxbridge	2-2	Haringey Borough
105	Watton United	0-1	Royston Town
106	Wednesfield Social	0-1	Hinckley Athletic
107	Wellingborough Town	3-2	Spalding United
108	Wisbech Town	1-0	Brackley Town
109	Witham Town	1-0	Burgess Hill Town
110	Wolverton Town	0-2	Ashtree Highfield
111	Wootton Blue Cross	0-0	Berkhamsted Town

=== Replays ===
Tie	Home team	Score	Away team
1	Oxford City	3-0	Abingdon United
3	Durham City	1-1	Alnwick Town
8	Rushall Olympic	3-0	Baker Perkins
12	Hailsham Town	2-4	Beckenham Town
19	Arlesey Town	1-0	Chalfont St Peter
24	Camberley Town	2-0	Corinthian-Casuals
28	Paulton Rovers	1-0	Devizes Town
30	Rothwell Town	2-1	Dudley Town
31	Swanage Town & Herston	3-1	Eastleigh
32	Portfield	1-3	Egham Town
34	Wivenhoe Town	4-2	Erith & Belvedere
36	Shoreham	2-0	Faversham Town
46	Chatteris Town	1-0	Grantham
47	Tilbury	0-2	Great Yarmouth Town
52	Potton United	1-2	Hertford Town
53	Dorking	2-1	Heybridge Swifts
54	Bilston Town	0-0	Highgate United
59	Whitehawk	2-0	Horsham
60	Yate Town	1-0	Hungerford Town
62	G K N Sankey	2-3	Leek Town
66	Tunbridge Wells	4-3	Maidenhead United
69	Welton Rovers	2-4	Newbury Town
74	Chester-le-Street Town	2-1	Ossett Albion
78	Wick	4-3	Petersfield United
80	Sittingbourne	2-3	Rainham Town
88	Hemel Hempstead	1-0	Soham Town Rangers
89	Tiverton Town	5-2	St Blazey
91	Ware	1-1	Staines Town
93	Vauxhall Motors (Luton)	3-2	Stamford
94	Hounslow	1-3	Sudbury Town
99	Gravesend & Northfleet	2-1	Three Bridges
104	Haringey Borough	2-3	Uxbridge
111	Berkhamsted Town	2-0	Wootton Blue Cross

=== 2nd replays ===
Tie	Home team	Score	Away team
3	Alnwick Town	0-0	Durham City
54	Bilston Town	2-0	Highgate United
91	Ware	4-2	Staines Town

=== 3rd replay ===
Tie	Home team	Score	Away team
3	Durham City	1-2	Alnwick Town

== 1st qualifying round ==
=== Ties ===
Tie	Home team	Score	Away team
1	Alfreton Town	4-2	Witton Albion
2	Alvechurch	1-1	Redditch United
3	Arlesey Town	0-4	Buckingham Town
4	Atherstone United	1-1	Malvern Town
5	Aveley	2-2	Bury Town
6	Aylesbury United	2-0	Wycombe Wanderers
7	Bangor City	2-2	Marine
8	Banstead Athletic	5-3	Beckenham Town
9	Barry Town	5-1	Clevedon Town
10	Basingstoke Town	3-0	Dulwich Hamlet
11	Berkhamsted Town	3-1	Hitchin Town
12	Bideford	1-1	Exmouth Town
13	Billericay Town	0-3	Kingsbury Town
14	Billingham Synthonia	2-0	Alnwick Town
15	Billingham Town	0-3	Bridlington Town
16	Bishop Auckland	5-2	Workington
17	Blyth Spartans	2-1	Gateshead
18	Boldmere St Michaels	2-2	Chatteris Town
19	Bootle	1-0	Ashton United
20	Boreham Wood	2-0	Vauxhall Motors (Luton)
21	Bracknell Town	3-2	Abingdon Town
22	Braintree Town	0-4	Sudbury Town
23	Bristol Manor Farm	0-3	Weston super Mare
24	Bromley	5-2	Ashford Town (Kent)
25	Burnham	1-1	Cray Wanderers
26	Buxton	6-3	Rhyl
27	Calne Town	1-5	Oxford City
28	Camberley Town	0-2	Welling United
29	Cambridge City	2-0	Harwich & Parkeston
30	Canvey Island	0-1	Baldock Town
31	Carshalton Athletic	1-0	Kingstonian
32	Chadderton	1-0	Heanor Town
33	Cheltenham Town	4-1	Dorchester Town
34	Chertsey Town	3-1	Haywards Heath Town
35	Chester-le-Street Town	2-1	Consett
36	Chichester City	1-1	Egham Town
37	Clapton	1-2	Great Yarmouth Town
38	Clitheroe	2-0	Whitley Bay
39	Corby Town	1-1	Worcester City
40	Crawley Town	4-1	Collier Row
41	Darenth Heathside	2-1	Leatherhead
42	Darlington Cleveland Bridge	2-0	Shotton Comrades
43	Darwen	2-2	Tow Law Town
44	Desborough Town	2-2	Racing Club Warwick
45	Easington Colliery	2-1	Leyland Motors
46	Eastbourne United	6-2	Hythe Town
47	Eastwood Hanley	0-0	Leek Town
48	Eastwood Town	1-2	Arnold
49	Ely City	1-1	Hemel Hempstead
50	Emley	2-0	Southport
51	Fareham Town	1-0	Trowbridge Town
52	Feltham	1-3	Hayes
53	Ferryhill Athletic	1-2	Gretna
54	Fleetwood Town	3-2	West Auckland Town
55	Friar Lane Old Boys	2-2	Bilston Town
56	Frome Town	2-2	Weymouth
57	Gloucester City	1-2	Ton Pentre
58	Gosport Borough	0-1	Yeovil Town
59	Gravesend & Northfleet	6-1	Herne Bay
60	Grays Athletic	1-3	Hertford Town
61	Halesowen Harriers	1-1	Moor Green
62	Halesowen Town	1-1	Ashtree Highfield
63	Harefield United	3-1	Crockenhill
64	Harlow Town	1-0	Woodford Town
65	Harrow Borough	2-0	Yeading
66	Havant Town	0-2	Waterlooville
67	Haverhill Rovers	1-1	Milton Keynes Borough
68	Heybridge Swifts	0-2	Fisher Athletic
69	Hinckley Athletic	2-3	Bedworth United
70	Histon	2-1	Walthamstow Avenue
71	Hoddesdon Town	1-3	Wembley
72	Horndean	0-2	Tonbridge A F C
73	Horwich R M I	1-1	South Liverpool
74	Hyde United	1-0	Mossley
75	Ilkeston Town	1-1	St Helens Town
76	Irlam Town	1-0	Radcliffe Borough
77	Irthlingborough Diamonds	3-1	Banbury United
78	King's Lynn	1-2	March Town United
79	Leamington	2-1	Coventry Sporting
80	Letchworth Garden City	1-0	Gorleston
81	Leyton Wingate	1-1	Stevenage Borough
82	Leytonstone Ilford	2-0	St Albans City
83	Lye Town	1-0	Evesham United
84	Maesteg Park	0-1	Tiverton Town
85	Malden Vale	1-3	Witham Town
86	Mangotsfield United	1-0	Yate Town
87	Marlow	5-1	Tunbridge Wells
88	Matlock Town	3-0	Gainsborough Trinity
89	Melksham Town	1-3	Wimborne Town
90	Merstham	1-3	Thanet United
91	Merthyr Tydfil	2-0	Paulton Rovers
92	Metropolitan Police	3-1	Dover Athletic
93	Mile Oak Rovers	1-2	Brigg Town
94	Minehead	1-1	Barnstaple Town
95	Molesey	1-2	Epsom & Ewell
96	Murton	0-1	Seaham Red Star
97	Netherfield	1-1	Crook Town
98	Newcastle Blue Star	1-0	Morecambe
99	Newport I O W	2-0	A F C Totton
100	North Ferriby United	2-3	Droylsden
101	North Shields	1-1	Barrow
102	Paget Rangers	1-4	Tamworth
103	Pagham	2-2	Worthing
104	Penrith	2-1	Brandon United
105	Prescot Cables	0-1	Colwyn Bay
106	Radstock Town	5-0	Newbury Town
107	Ramsgate	2-0	Shoreham
108	Redhill	3-3	Hornchurch
109	Rossendale United	1-1	Worksop Town
110	Ruislip Manor	3-2	Royston Town
111	Rushall Olympic	0-2	Oldbury United
112	Rushden Town	1-4	Rothwell Town
113	Ryhope Community Association	1-1	Ashington
114	Saffron Walden Town	2-1	Rainham Town
115	Sharpness	1-4	Ottery St Mary
116	Shepshed Charterhouse	2-0	Stourbridge
117	Sholing Sports	1-3	Swanage Town & Herston
118	South Bank	1-0	Spennymoor United
119	Southwick	1-3	Croydon
120	Stalybridge Celtic	1-1	Macclesfield Town
121	Stockton	1-0	Denaby United
122	Stowmarket Town	1-3	Dunstable
123	Sutton Coldfield Town	1-1	Hinckley Town
124	Sutton Town	1-2	Goole Town
125	Taunton Town	0-3	Saltash United
126	Thackley	1-1	Guisborough Town
127	Torrington	0-3	Forest Green Rovers
128	Uxbridge	4-1	Barking
129	Walsall Wood	0-3	Stafford Rangers
130	Walton & Hersham	3-0	Finchley
131	Ware	0-1	Hendon
132	Warrington Town	1-1	Northwich Victoria
133	Wellingborough Town	1-1	Leicester United
134	Whitehawk	1-2	Littlehampton Town
135	Whyteleafe	2-0	Lancing
136	Wick	1-1	Tooting & Mitcham United
137	Willenhall Town	3-2	Bromsgrove Rovers
138	Willington	0-3	Harrogate Town
139	Windsor & Eton	0-0	Woking
140	Wisbech Town	2-0	Kettering Town
141	Witney Town	0-3	Barnet
142	Wivenhoe Town	0-3	Sutton United
143	Wokingham Town	3-0	Lewes
144	Wren Rovers	1-2	Farsley Celtic

=== Replays ===
Tie	Home team	Score	Away team
2	Redditch United	1-3	Alvechurch
4	Malvern Town	0-2	Atherstone United
5	Bury Town	3-1	Aveley
7	Marine	3-1	Bangor City
12	Exmouth Town	0-2	Bideford
18	Chatteris Town	0-3	Boldmere St Michaels
25	Cray Wanderers	1-2	Burnham
36	Egham Town	0-2	Chichester City
39	Worcester City	3-1	Corby Town
43	Tow Law Town	3-2	Darwen
44	Racing Club Warwick	4-0	Desborough Town
47	Leek Town	2-0	Eastwood Hanley
49	Hemel Hempstead	2-1	Ely City
55	Bilston Town	3-2	Friar Lane Old Boys
56	Weymouth	3-0	Frome Town
61	Moor Green	2-1	Halesowen Harriers
62	Ashtree Highfield	0-1	Halesowen Town
67	Milton Keynes Borough	0-4	Haverhill Rovers
73	South Liverpool	3-4	Horwich R M I
75	St Helens Town	1-1	Ilkeston Town
81	Stevenage Borough	2-3	Leyton Wingate
88	Gainsborough Trinity	0-3	Matlock Town
94	Barnstaple Town	1-0	Minehead
97	Crook Town	2-1	Netherfield
101	Barrow	3-0	North Shields
103	Worthing	0-2	Pagham
108	Hornchurch	1-3	Redhill
109	Worksop Town	2-4	Rossendale United
113	Ashington	1-2	Ryhope Community Association
120	Macclesfield Town	5-1	Stalybridge Celtic
123	Hinckley Town	2-1	Sutton Coldfield Town
126	Guisborough Town	0-0	Thackley
132	Northwich Victoria	5-1	Warrington Town
133	Leicester United	1-0	Wellingborough Town
136	Tooting & Mitcham United	3-0	Wick
139	Woking	6-3	Windsor & Eton

=== 2nd replays ===
Tie	Home team	Score	Away team
75	Ilkeston Town	1-4	St Helens Town
126	Guisborough Town	1-0	Thackley

== 2nd qualifying round ==
=== Ties ===
Tie	Home team	Score	Away team
1	Alfreton Town	2-0	Irlam Town
2	Arnold	2-3	Matlock Town
3	Atherstone United	1-0	Lye Town
4	Banstead Athletic	0-0	Woking
5	Barnstaple Town	1-2	Forest Green Rovers
6	Barry Town	0-1	Merthyr Tydfil
7	Bedworth United	1-2	Racing Club Warwick
8	Berkhamsted Town	3-3	Hemel Hempstead
9	Bilston Town	0-3	Willenhall Town
10	Boldmere St Michaels	1-2	Shepshed Charterhouse
11	Bootle	2-2	Marine
12	Bracknell Town	4-0	Chichester City
13	Bridlington Town	1-2	Blyth Spartans
14	Buckingham Town	0-0	Boreham Wood
15	Burnham	2-1	Harrow Borough
16	Bury Town	1-1	Letchworth Garden City
17	Chatham Town	0-3	Fisher Athletic
18	Chertsey Town	0-1	Newport I O W
19	Chester-le-Street Town	1-1	Billingham Synthonia
20	Clitheroe	0-0	Harrogate Town
21	Colwyn Bay	2-2	Buxton
22	Crook Town	0-1	Barrow
23	Darlington Cleveland Bridge	2-1	South Bank
24	Dunstable	0-1	Leyton Wingate
25	Eastbourne United	0-0	Tonbridge A F C
26	Goole Town	1-3	Brigg Town
27	Gravesend & Northfleet	1-0	Witham Town
28	Great Yarmouth Town	3-1	Cambridge City
29	Gretna	1-2	Fleetwood Town
30	Halesowen Town	5-1	Leicester United
31	Harefield United	2-3	Bromley
32	Harlow Town	1-1	Kingsbury Town
33	Haverhill Rovers	0-1	March Town United
34	Hayes	4-1	Darenth Heathside
35	Hendon	1-2	Hertford Town
36	Histon	1-2	Leytonstone Ilford
37	Irthlingborough Diamonds	0-4	Barnet
38	Leamington	0-6	Worcester City
39	Leek Town	2-1	Hyde United
40	Littlehampton Town	0-3	Thame United
41	Macclesfield Town	5-0	Chadderton
42	Mangotsfield United	1-1	Cheltenham Town
43	Marlow	1-1	Basingstoke Town
44	Metropolitan Police	3-0	Epsom & Ewell
45	Northwich Victoria	2-1	Droylsden
46	Oldbury United	5-2	Hinckley Town
47	Penrith	1-2	Easington Colliery
48	Ramsgate	0-1	Croydon
49	Rossendale United	2-3	Guisborough Town
50	Rothwell Town	1-2	Alvechurch
51	Ryhope Community Association	0-2	Newcastle Blue Star
52	Saffron Walden Town	1-5	Carshalton Athletic
53	Saltash United	7-1	Ottery St Mary
54	Seaham Red Star	0-1	Bishop Auckland
55	St Helens Town	0-0	Horwich R M I
56	Stafford Rangers	2-3	Moor Green
57	Stockton	0-1	Emley
58	Sudbury Town	1-1	Aylesbury United
59	Sutton United	3-1	Redhill
60	Swanage Town & Herston	0-2	Fareham Town
61	Tiverton Town	4-2	Bideford
62	Ton Pentre	1-2	Weston-super-Mare
63	Tooting & Mitcham United	0-0	Pagham
64	Tow Law Town	2-1	Farsley Celtic
65	Uxbridge	1-0	Baldock Town
66	Waterlooville	1-1	Yeovil Town
67	Welling United	2-1	Walton & Hersham
68	Wembley	1-1	Ruislip Manor
69	Weymouth	3-0	Radstock Town
70	Whyteleafe	3-3	Wokingham Town
71	Wimborne Town	2-1	Oxford City
72	Wisbech Town	2-3	Tamworth

=== Replays ===
Tie	Home team	Score	Away team
4	Woking	1-0	Banstead Athletic
8	Hemel Hempstead	1-4	Berkhamsted Town
11	Marine	1-0	Bootle
14	Boreham Wood	2-1	Buckingham Town
16	Letchworth Garden City	3-1	Bury Town
19	Billingham Synthonia	4-3	Chester-le-Street Town
20	Harrogate Town	2-1	Clitheroe
21	Buxton	2-5	Colwyn Bay
25	Tonbridge A F C	3-1	Eastbourne United
32	Kingsbury Town	2-2	Harlow Town
42	Cheltenham Town	2-0	Mangotsfield United
43	Basingstoke Town	2-1	Marlow
55	Horwich R M I	2-3	St Helens Town
58	Aylesbury United	2-1	Sudbury Town
63	Pagham	3-4	Tooting & Mitcham United
66	Yeovil Town	3-2	Waterlooville
68	Ruislip Manor	5-0	Wembley
70	Wokingham Town	1-0	Whyteleafe

=== 2nd replays ===
Tie	Home team	Score	Away team
32	Kingsbury Town	3-2	Harlow Town

== 3rd qualifying round ==
=== Ties ===
Tie	Home team	Score	Away team
1	Alfreton Town	1-1	Colwyn Bay
2	Atherstone United	4-3	Alvechurch
3	Berkhamsted Town	0-3	Barnet
4	Billingham Synthonia	5-2	Blyth Spartans
5	Boreham Wood	1-3	Worcester City
6	Bracknell Town	4-1	Newport I O W
7	Brigg Town	3-2	Leek Town
8	Easington Colliery	3-0	Newcastle Blue Star
9	Fleetwood Town	0-0	Barrow
10	Gravesend & Northfleet	2-6	Carshalton Athletic
11	Guisborough Town	3-2	Emley
12	Harrogate Town	1-1	Bishop Auckland
13	Hayes	2-0	Fisher Athletic
14	Hertford Town	0-4	Aylesbury United
15	Kingsbury Town	0-1	Leytonstone Ilford
16	Letchworth Garden City	2-2	March Town United
17	Macclesfield Town	0-0	Marine
18	Merthyr Tydfil	3-1	Forest Green Rovers
19	Metropolitan Police	0-1	Croydon
20	Moor Green	3-2	Matlock Town
21	Northwich Victoria	3-2	St Helens Town
22	Oldbury United	0-1	Willenhall Town
23	Racing Club Warwick	1-3	Halesowen Town
24	Saltash United	3-0	Tiverton Town
25	Sutton United	0-0	Bromley
26	Tamworth	3-2	Shepshed Charterhouse
27	Thanet United	1-1	Woking
28	Tonbridge A F C	0-0	Wokingham Town
29	Tooting & Mitcham United	0-0	Basingstoke Town
30	Tow Law Town	4-0	Darlington Cleveland Bridge
31	Uxbridge	0-2	Great Yarmouth Town
32	Welling United	3-1	Burnham
33	Wembley	2-2	Leyton Wingate
34	Weston-super-Mare	1-2	Cheltenham Town
35	Weymouth	2-2	Fareham Town
36	Wimborne Town	0-4	Yeovil Town

=== Replays ===
Tie	Home team	Score	Away team
1	Colwyn Bay	1-0	Alfreton Town
9	Barrow	3-2	Fleetwood Town
12	Bishop Auckland	2-0	Harrogate Town
16	March Town United	2-3	Letchworth Garden City
17	Marine	1-2	Macclesfield Town
25	Bromley	1-2	Sutton United
27	Woking	0-2	Thanet United
28	Wokingham Town	2-1	Tonbridge A F C
29	Basingstoke Town	4-1	Tooting & Mitcham United
33	Leyton Wingate	5-1	Wembley
35	Fareham Town	1-2	Weymouth

== 4th qualifying round ==
The teams that given byes to this round are Lincoln City, Maidstone United, Enfield, Boston United, Runcorn, Bath City, Dagenham, Wealdstone, Nuneaton Borough, Frickley Athletic, Dartford, Bishop's Stortford, Bognor Regis Town, Farnborough Town, Whitby Town, Chelmsford City, Slough Town, V S Rugby, Caernarfon Town and Chorley.

=== Ties ===
Tie	Home team	Score	Away team
1	Bath City	3-1	Slough Town
2	Boston United	1-1	Welling United
3	Brigg Town	1-4	Lincoln City
4	Caernarfon Town	0-2	Billingham Synthonia
5	Carshalton Athletic	2-1	Wokingham Town
6	Cheltenham Town	2-1	Bracknell Town
7	Chorley	2-0	Frickley Athletic
8	Colwyn Bay	2-1	Tow Law Town
9	Enfield	1-2	Aylesbury United
10	Farnborough Town	4-2	Saltash United
11	Great Yarmouth Town	0-2	Dagenham
12	Guisborough Town	1-2	Bishop Auckland
13	Halesowen Town	1-0	Bishop's Stortford
14	Hayes	2-0	Moor Green
15	Letchworth Garden City	0-1	Chelmsford City
16	Leyton Wingate	0-0	Atherstone United
17	Leytonstone Ilford	0-1	Worcester City
18	Macclesfield Town	3-1	Whitby Town
19	Maidstone United	2-0	Dartford
20	Merthyr Tydfil	3-0	Croydon
21	Northwich Victoria	3-0	Easington Colliery
22	Runcorn	2-1	Barrow
23	Sutton United	3-0	Basingstoke Town
24	Tamworth	2-0	Wealdstone
25	Thanet United	0-4	Bognor Regis Town
26	V S Rugby	3-0	Nuneaton Borough
27	Weymouth	1-3	Yeovil Town
28	Willenhall Town	0-6	Barnet

=== Replays ===
Tie	Home team	Score	Away team
2	Atherstone United	4-2	Leyton Wingate
16	Welling United	3-2	Boston United

== 1987-88 FA Cup ==
See 1987-88 FA Cup for details of the rounds from the first round proper onwards.
