= Burnley F.C. 0–1 Lincoln City F.C. (2017) =

Burnley 0–1 Lincoln City
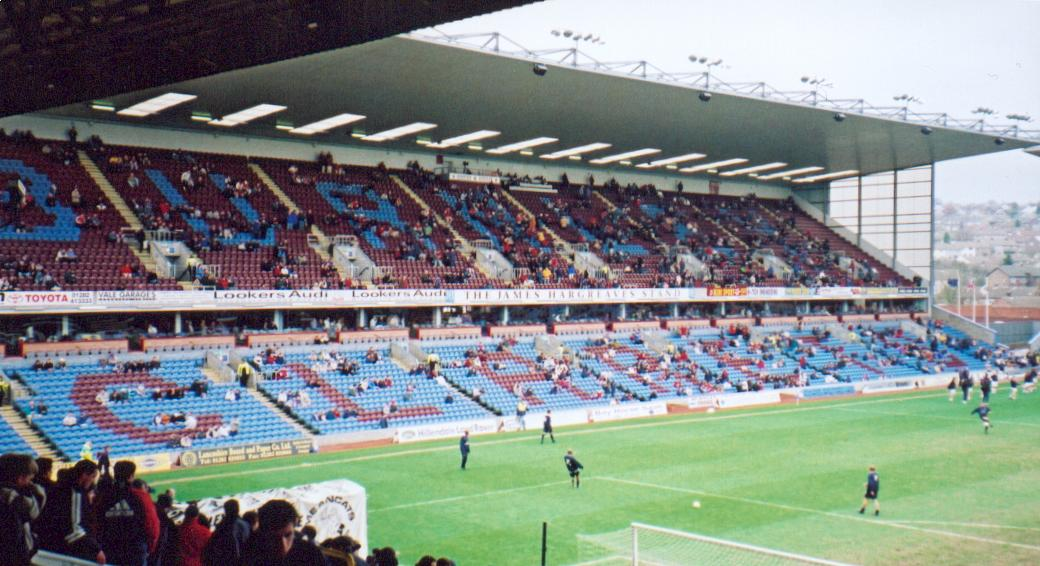
- Event: 2016–17 FA Cup
Burnley	Lincoln City
0	1
- Date: 18 February 2017
- Venue: Turf Moor, Burnley
- Man of the Match: Matt Rhead (Lincoln City)
- Referee: Graham Scott
- Attendance: 19,185

Burnley vs Lincoln City was an FA Cup fifth round tie, played on 18 February 2017 at Turf Moor, Burnley between Premier League side Burnley and National League side Lincoln City, who won the game 1–0. This was the first time a top division side lost to a non-League side since Norwich City's 1–0 loss to Luton Town in 2013 (for whom Burnley striker Andre Gray was playing at the time, meaning he beat a Premier League team with a non-League side, and lost to a non-League side with a Premier League team). This was also the first time in 103 years that a non-League side reached the last 8 stage of the FA Cup (now the Quarter Finals or sixth round, then the fourth round), since Queens Park Rangers of the Southern Football League in 1914, and the first outright since the non-League became part of the English football league system instead of running parallel to the English Football League. Lincoln City would go on to play Premier League side, and eventual FA Cup champions, Arsenal away at the Emirates Stadium in the quarter-finals, losing 5–0.

== Route to the match ==
=== Burnley ===
Round	Opposition	Score
3rd Replay	Sunderland (a); Sunderland (h)	0–0; 2–0
4th	Bristol City (h)	2–0
Key: (h) = Home venue; (a) = Away venue; (n) = Neutral venue.

As a Premier League team, Burnley started in the third round where they were drawn away at fellow Premier League team Sunderland. They drew 0–0 at the Stadium of Light but won the replay at Turf Moor 2–0 due to goals from Sam Vokes and Andre Gray. In the fourth round they were drawn at home with Football League Championship team Bristol City, where they won 2–1 due to goals from Vokes and Steven Defour.

=== Lincoln City ===
Round	Opposition	Score
QR4 Replay	Guiseley (h); Guiseley (a)	0–0; 1–2
1st	Altrincham (h)	2–1
2nd	Oldham Athletic (h)	3–2
3rd Replay	Ipswich Town (a); Ipswich Town (h)	2–2; 1–0
4th	Brighton & Hove Albion (h)	3–1
Key: (h) = Home venue; (a) = Away venue; (n) = Neutral venue.

As a National League team, Lincoln City started in the fourth qualifying round, where they were drawn with fellow National League team, Guiseley at home. After a 0–0 draw at Sincil Bank, they won the replay 2–1 at Nethermoor Park due to goals from Adam Boyes and Theo Robinson. In the first round proper, they drew National League North side Altrincham at home, where they won 2–1 due to goals from Sean Raggett and Alan Power. In the second round they drew Football League One team Oldham Athletic. At Sincil Bank, Lincoln City progressed after a 3–2 win due to two goals from Robinson and one from Terry Hawkridge. In the third round, they drew Football League Championship Ipswich Town away. After a 2–2 draw at Portman Road they won the replay at Sincil Bank 1–0 due to a goal from Nathan Arnold. In the fourth round they played Football League Championship team Brighton & Hove Albion at Sincil Bank. Lincoln City won 3–1 due to goals from Power, Robinson and an own goal from Fikayo Tomori to set up the match with Premier League Burnley.

== Match ==
Burnley went into the match with only three home defeats in their last 29 games. Lincoln approached the game using their players in numbers to Burnley's tactics. In the first half, both teams had chances with Lincoln's Jack Muldoon shooting over the crossbar and Burnley's Andre Gray getting a shot on target but it was saved by Lincoln goalkeeper Paul Farman. The first half finished 0–0. During the second half, there was a contest between Burnley's Joey Barton and Lincoln's Matt Rhead which eventually ended up in a brawl inside Lincoln's penalty area when Rhead claimed Barton had stamped on him and then Barton pushed Terry Hawkridge in the face and received a yellow card for it. Lincoln then started putting crosses into Burnley's penalty area. Eventually Lincoln scored on 89 minutes with their only shot on target of the game due to a header from Sean Raggett, which was confirmed via goal-line technology. Burnley responded with a number of attacks during five minutes of stoppage time, forcing Lincoln to defend a number of shots and corner kicks however Lincoln held on for the win becoming the first non-league side in 103 years to reach the FA Cup quarter-finals.

After the match, the Lincoln City manager Danny Cowley called it a "football miracle" and said about the goal "thank God for goal-line technology!". Burnley manager Sean Dyche said "I'm only gutted in the sense that could happen...My team were nowhere near the level they can show. You have to work, be diligent and believe you will get another chance. I think they only had one chance, credit to them."

As a result of their victory, Lincoln City were drawn away in the quarter finals at Premier League Arsenal at the Emirates Stadium, where they were offered 9,000 away tickets. This was the full 15% away allocation permitted under FA Cup regulations, which Arsenal had only previously offered twice before due to safety concerns.

=== Details ===
18 February 2017
12:30 GMT

Burnley	0–1	Lincoln City
	Report	Raggett 89'

Turf Moor, Burnley
Attendance: 19,185
Referee: Graham Scott

Burnley	Lincoln City

GK	1	(England) Tom Heaton (c)
RB	27	(England) Tendayi Darikwa
CB	5	(England) Michael Keane
CB	26	(England) James Tarkowski
LB	4	(England) Jon Flanagan
RM	25	(Iceland) Jóhann Berg Guðmundsson		(substituted off) 20'
CM	18	(England) Ashley Westwood
CM	19	(England) Joey Barton	(yellow card) 70'
LM	37	(Canada) Scott Arfield
CF	7	(England) Andre Gray
CF	9	(Wales) Sam Vokes		(substituted off) 73'
Substitutes:
GK	17	(England) Paul Robinson
DF	2	(England) Matthew Lowton
DF	6	(England) Ben Mee
DF	23	(Republic of Ireland) Stephen Ward
MF	21	(Scotland) George Boyd		(substituted on) 20'
FW	10	(England) Ashley Barnes	(yellow card) 90+1'	(substituted on) 73'
FW	31	(England) Dan Agyei
Manager:
(England) Sean Dyche

GK	1	(England) Paul Farman
RB	2	(England) Bradley Wood (c)	(yellow card) 70'
CB	5	(England) Luke Waterfall
CB	25	(England) Sean Raggett
LB	3	(England) Sam Habergham
RM	28	(England) Nathan Arnold
CM	30	(England) Alex Woodyard
CM	8	(Republic of Ireland) Alan Power	(yellow card) 17'
LM	11	(England) Terry Hawkridge		(substituted off) 81'
CF	7	(England) Jack Muldoon		(substituted off) 64'
CF	9	(England) Matt Rhead		(substituted off) 90+1'
Substitutes:
GK	21	(England) Richard Walton
DF	12	(Republic of Ireland) Sean Long
DF	27	(England) Jamie McCombe		(substituted on) 90+1'
MF	38	(England) Joe Ward		(substituted on) 81'
FW	10	(England) Adam Marriott
FW	24	(England) Jack McMenemy
FW	31	(England) Dayle Southwell		(substituted on) 64'
Manager:
(England) Danny Cowley
