= Wilf Sharp =

Scottish footballer

Personal information
- Full name: Wilfred Sharp
- Date of birth: 8 April 1907
- Place of birth: Bathgate, Scotland
- Date of death: June 1981 (aged 73–74)
- Place of death: Sefton, Merseyside
- Height: 5 ft 10 in (1.78 m)
- Position: Wing half

Senior career*
Years	Team	Apps	(Gls)
–	Pumpherston Rangers		
–	Bathgate		
–	Kirkintilloch Rob Roy		
1925–1929	Clydebank	94	(4)
1929–1934	Airdrieonians	148	(6)
1932–1933	Tunbridge Wells Rangers (loan)		
1934–1936	Sheffield Wednesday	48	(2)
1936–1937	Bradford Park Avenue	17	(0)
1937–1939	Burton Town		
Total		307	(12)
- * Club domestic league appearances and goals

Wilfred Sharp (8 April 1907 – June 1981) was a Scottish professional footballer who played for Clydebank, Airdrieonians, Sheffield Wednesday and Bradford Park Avenue. Sharp was a right half whose career lasted from 1925 to 1936, he only made 65 appearances in the English League but in that time he won a FA Cup winners medal while with Sheffield Wednesday in 1935.

== Playing career ==
=== Early days ===
Sharp was born in Bathgate, West Lothian. He played for Bathgate, Pumpherston Rangers and Kirkintilloch Rob Roy before signing as a professional for Clydebank in 1925, aged 18. He stayed at Clydeholm for four years before signing in 1929 for Airdrieonians. Sharp stayed with Airdrieonians for five years although he did have a short spell as a professional at Tunbridge Wells Rangers in 1932. In August 1934 he was spotted by Sheffield Wednesday manager Billy Walker and signed for The Owls for a fee of £750 on 11 August.

=== Sheffield Wednesday ===
Walker signed Sharp as a possible replacement for Wednesday's long-serving half back Alf Strange who at 34 years old was in the twilight of his career. Even without Strange in the team, there was strong competition for the half back positions with Horace Burrows and Gavin Malloch keeping Sharp out of the team for the early months of the 1934–35 season. However, an injury to Malloch on 1 December 1934 in a home draw with Sunderland led to Sharp making his debut the following Saturday in a 1–0 victory at Leicester. Sharp showed good form and kept Malloch out of the side for the rest of the season as Wednesday went on a fine run of results, eventually finishing third in Division One and winning the 1935 FA Cup final. The following season saw the team struggle to avoid relegation, Sharp (who was not involved in the 1935 FA Charity Shield) played 24 matches and eventually asked for a transfer as his wife could not settle in Sheffield. In his two years at Wednesday, Sharp played 48 league games and 10 FA Cup games, scoring two goals.

=== Bradford Park Avenue ===
The hoped-for switch back to Scottish football did not materialise, and Sharp signed for Bradford Park Avenue in May 1936, playing 17 league games in his single season with them before moving to non league Burton Town in August 1937.

Sharp retired from football before the outbreak of World War II; he died in June 1981, aged 74 in Sefton, Merseyside.

== Honours ==
Sheffield Wednesday

- FA Cup: 1934–35
