= Jack Surtees =

English footballer (1911–1992)

Personal information
- Full name: John Surtees
- Date of birth: 1 July 1911
- Place of birth: Willington Quay, Wallsend, England
- Date of death: 16 July 1992 (aged 81)
- Place of death: Percy Main, Tyne and Wear, England
- Position: Inside right

Youth career
- 1927–1930: Percy Main Amateurs

Senior career*
Years	Team	Apps	(Gls)
1930–1932	Middlesbrough	1	(0)
1932–1933	Portsmouth	1	(0)
1933–1934	Bournemouth & Boscombe Athletic	21	(4)
1934	Northampton Town	0	(0)
1934–1936	Sheffield Wednesday	40	(5)
1936–1939	Nottingham Forest	93	(23)

Managerial career
- 1942: Darlington
- * Club domestic league appearances and goals

John Surtees (1 July 1911 – 16 July 1992) was an English professional footballer whose career lasted from 1931 until 1939. He played for Middlesbrough, Portsmouth, Bournemouth and Boscombe Athletic, Sheffield Wednesday and Nottingham Forest. Surtees was an inside forward who made 156 League appearances plus 15 in the F.A. Cup, scoring 36 goals.

== Playing career ==
=== Early days ===
Surtees was born in Willington Quay, Wallsend, Northumberland and played football for Percy Main Amateurs in the Northern Football Alliance before as a 20-year-old he was signed by Division One side Middlesbrough. He only made one appearance in the 1931–32 season before he moved to Portsmouth for the following season. Once again Surtees only made one appearance for the south coast club before moving to Bournemouth and Boscombe Athletic of the Third Division South in an exchange deal involving Surtees and John Friar going to Bournemouth and Len Williams moving in the opposite direction. He established himself in a struggling Bournemouth team playing 21 times in the 1933–34 season, at the end of which the club had to apply for re-election.

Surtees changed teams once again for the 1934–35 season, joining Northampton Town in May 1934 but he had an unhappy time at the County Ground failing to make a first team appearance. So discontented was Surtees with his football career at this point that he agreed a release from his contract with Northampton and arranged to emigrate to North America. However his brother Albert, who had played at Aston Villa in 1924 with Sheffield Wednesday boss Billy Walker managed to arrange a months trial for Surtees at Hillsborough.

=== Sheffield Wednesday ===
Surtees arrived at Hillsborough in November 1934 and contrary to his earlier career, his fine form was an eye-opener, so much so that he was given a first team chance on Christmas Day 1934 in a 2–0 home victory against Birmingham City when Ronnie Starling was rested. Surtees retained his place, even though Starling returned to the side with Harry Burgess losing his position in the team after a fall out with the manager. Surtees played all but one of the remaining 28 matches that season, including six FA Cup ties as Wednesday won the trophy at Wembley. Surtees lost his place in the Wednesday side in early 1936 with the emergence of a young Jackie Robinson and was transferred to Nottingham Forest in October 1936 for a fee of £2,500.

=== Later career ===
Surtees stayed with Forest until the outbreak of World War II playing regularly in a side which were struggling at the wrong end of the Second Division playing 96 games in all competitions. During the war he played occasionally for Forest and also as a guest for York City until he was appointed manager of Darlington in May 1942 for a brief period. In November 1948 he returned to Sheffield Wednesday in a scouting capacity, a position he held until 1960. Jack Surtees died on 16 July 1992, aged 81.

== Managerial statistics ==
Team	Nat	From	To	Record				
Team	Nat	From	To	G	W	L	D	Win %
Darlington	(England)	1 May 1942	31 May 1942	0	0	0	0	0.00

== Honours ==
Sheffield Wednesday

- FA Cup: 1934–35
