= Malloch =

Malloch is a surname. Notable people with the name include:

- Curtis Malloch (fl. 2010s), Canadian politician
- Douglas Malloch (1877–1938), American poet, writer and editor
- Edward Malloch (1801–1867), Canadian merchant and politician
- Elizabeth Malloch (1910–2000), Scottish educator and priest
- Gavin Malloch (1905–1974), Scottish footballer
- Jack Malloch (1920–1982), Rhodesian aircraft pilot
- Jock Malloch (1877–1935), Scottish footballer
- John Russell Malloch (1875–1963), Scottish entomologist
- Jordan Malloch (born 1978), American sprint canoer
- Kathy Malloch, American nursing scholar
- Katie Malloch, Canadian broadcaster
- Lance Malloch-Brown (born 1979), Zimbabwean cricketer
- Mark Malloch Brown, Baron Malloch-Brown (born 1953), British politician and journalist
- Ted Malloch (born 1952), American author and consultant
