= Walter Millership =

English footballer

Walt Millership
Personal information
- Full name: Walter Millership
- Date of birth: June 1910
- Place of birth: Warsop Vale, Nottinghamshire, England
- Date of death: 1978 (aged 67–68)
- Place of death: Brimington, Derbyshire, England
- Positions: Centre half; centre forward

Youth career
- –1928: Warsop Main
- Welbeck Athletic
- Shirebrook Town

Senior career*
Years	Team	Apps	(Gls)
1928–1930	Bradford Park Avenue	30	(13)
1930–1946	Sheffield Wednesday	210	(25)
	→ (wartime)	155	(12)
- → Doncaster Rovers (guest)
- → Sheffield United (guest)
1946–1948	Denaby United		
- * Club domestic league appearances and goals

Walter Millership was an English professional footballer who played for Bradford Park Avenue and Sheffield Wednesday in a career that lasted from 1928 until 1939 during which time he played 240 League games (271 including cup games), scoring 38 league goals (47 including cup). Millership made his name as a centre-half but he originally was a centre forward in his early playing days.

== Early days ==
Millership was born in the small mining village of Warsop Vale in Nottinghamshire on 8 June 1910. As a youth he excelled at both football and cricket, playing his football for Warsop Main, Welbeck Athletic and Shirebrook Town F.C. Upon leaving school he worked at Warsop colliery and was soon approached by Nottinghamshire County Cricket Club, but their effort to sign him was rebuffed by Millership who wanted to further his football career.

== Bradford Park Avenue ==
In January 1928, he was invited for a trial at Bradford Park Avenue and was promptly signed making three appearances in the remainder of that season as Park Avenue lifted the Third Division North championship. The following season Millership only made two appearances and it was not until the 1929–30 season that he became a regular in the Park Avenue forward line scoring 12 goals in 25 appearances including a goal in the FA cup fourth round upset of Derby County and another in the 1–5 fifth round defeat against League champions Sheffield Wednesday on 15 February 1930. Despite the heavy defeat, Wednesday manager Bob Brown was sufficiently impressed with Millership to sign him for the Hillsborough club the following month for a fee of £2,600.

== Sheffield Wednesday ==
Millership played six games at inside right in the remainder of the 1929–30 season as Wednesday retained their Division One title. However, for the next three season Millership's first team opportunities were limited as he was kept out of the side by ace inside forwards Jimmy Seed, Harry Burgess and latterly Ronnie Starling. In the 1931–32 season he had the fine record of 14 goals in 17 appearances including four goals in a 7–0 FA Cup 4th round victory over A.F.C. Bournemouth in January 1932 and a League hat-trick against Blackburn Rovers in the same month.

Millership's big chance in the Wednesday team came when it was decided to play him as a centre half towards the end of the 1932–33 season as a temporary replacement for the injured Tony Leach. Millership revelled in the central defensive position, his sturdy play earning him the nickname "Battleship" from Wednesday fans and by the end of 1933 he had made the position his own. He was Wednesday's first choice centre half for the next five seasons, playing in the 1935 FA Cup Final victory over West Brom and coming close to earning an England cap, playing in an international trial in March 1935. He also played as Wednesday won the 1935 FA Charity Shield.

Millership lost his centre half place to Harry Hanford in the last full season before World War II (1938–39), however he played 12 games as a stand in centre forward, scoring eight goals when Doug Hunt was injured. Millership captained Wednesday throughout the war playing in 155 wartime games, scoring 12 goals. He played in the 1943 War Cup Final defeat to Blackpool F.C. He also played as a guest for Doncaster Rovers and Sheffield United during the war.

== Later life ==
Millership played on in Non-League football after the war signing for Denaby United in May 1946. It was at this time that Millership can claim to have discovered the 17-year-old Derek Dooley who scored a hat trick for Lincoln City reserves whilst playing against Denaby. Millership was quickly on the phone to Wednesday to inform them of Dooley's talent and he was signed in great haste by Wednesday manager Eric Taylor. In 1948 Millership returned to coal mining at Arkwright Town colliery and stayed there until his retirement in 1969. Walter Millership died in 1978 at Brimington near Chesterfield.

== Honours ==
Sheffield Wednesday

- FA Cup: 1934–35
