= Horace Burrows =

English footballer (1910–1969)

Personal information
- Date of birth: 11 March 1910
- Place of birth: Sutton-in-Ashfield, England
- Date of death: 22 March 1969 (aged 59)
- Place of death: Sutton-in-Ashfield, England
- Position: Left half

Youth career
- 1922–1931: Notts Schools
- Sutton Junction
- Mansfield Town

Senior career*
Years	Team	Apps	(Gls)
1931–1939	Sheffield Wednesday	233	(8)

International career
1934–1935	England	3	(0)
- * Club domestic league appearances and goals

Horace Burrows (11 March 1910 – 22 March 1969) was a professional footballer who played for Mansfield Town and Sheffield Wednesday. Burrows was a left half whose league career lasted from 1932 to 1939, his career was curtailed by the outbreak of World War II. Burrows also played for the England national football team on three occasions.

== Playing career ==
=== Non-league football ===
Burrows was born in Sutton-in-Ashfield on 11 March 1910, as a youth he won honours with Nottinghamshire Schools and played for local club Sutton Junction F.C. In February 1929 he was offered a trial by Division Three South side Coventry City and was signed on after a successful tryout. Burrows never managed to break into the Coventry first team and after a year was forced to drop back to playing Non-League football with Mansfield Town who at that time were in the Midland Football League. He had a successful year at Mansfield playing 44 games and helping them get elected to The Football League. His good form was noticed by Sheffield Wednesday manager Bob Brown and he signed for Wednesday on 1 May 1931 for a fee of £200.

=== Sheffield Wednesday ===
Burrows found it impossible to force his way into the Wednesday side at left half, initially being kept out by Gavin Malloch. He eventually made his debut on 27 December 1932 against Manchester City and became Wednesday's regular left half for the next six seasons up to the outbreak of World War II. He played in 136 consecutive games for Wednesday from April 1933 till March 1936. This sequence of games included Wednesday's FA Cup run in 1935 when they lifted the trophy. He subsequently played as Wednesday won the 1935 FA Charity Shield. He was also capped three times by England in this period, being first called up in May 1934 against Hungary. Subsequent internationals followed against Czechoslovakia and Holland before he lost out to Wilf Copping in the national side.

== War and retirement ==
At the outbreak of war, Burrows continued to play for Wednesday in the wartime leagues and work in a sports shop that he had opened in his home town of Sutton-in-Ashfield. He played 49 wartime games for Wednesday and several as a guest for Millwall before being called up in January 1942 and joining the Sherwood Foresters. He fought and was injured in the First Battle of El Alamein. After leaving the army in 1945 he re-opened his sports shop in Sutton-in-Ashfield, he also became player-manager of Ollerton Colliery for a time. Horace Burrows continued to run his shop until his death on 22 March 1969. The shop is no longer trading, but was run by his son Adrian who also played professional football between 1979 and 1993 making over 200 appearances for Plymouth Argyle.

== Honours ==
Sheffield Wednesday

- FA Cup: 1934–35
