= Mark Hooper =

English footballer

Personal information
- Date of birth: 14 July 1901
- Place of birth: Darlington, England
- Date of death: 9 March 1974 (aged 72)
- Place of death: Sheffield, England
- Position: Right winger

Youth career
- –1924: Cockfield

Senior career*
Years	Team	Apps	(Gls)
1924–1927	Darlington	116	(43)
1927–1938	Sheffield Wednesday	384	(125)
1938–1939	Rotherham United	0	(0)
- * Club domestic league appearances and goals

Mark Hooper (14 July 1901 – 9 March 1974) was an English professional footballer who played for Darlington, Sheffield Wednesday and briefly with Rotherham United in a 16-year career which lasted from 1923 to 1939, although he appeared in 1945 in a few games after World War II . In total he played 500 League games (550 including cup games) in that time, scoring 168 League goals with 11 more in the FA Cup. Hooper was a diminutive right winger who was only 5 ft 6 in (1.67 m) tall, weighed under 10 stone (64 kg) and wore size 4 boots.

== Family ==
Hooper was born in Darlington on 14 July 1901. He was brought up in the Rise Carr area and was part of a family of footballers. His brother Bill had an eight-year-long professional career while other brothers Carl and Danny had brief periods in the paid ranks. His uncle Charlie Roberts captained Manchester United and England while his sisters Sarah and Betty were members of the Darlington Quaker Ladies team. His father worked in the local rolling mill.

== Playing career ==
Hooper was initially a goalkeeper but switched to an outfield position after being told he was too small to be an effective keeper. He played as an amateur for Cockfield and featured in the inaugural Northern League Cup final in 1922–23. He was part of the team that reached the FA Amateur Cup semi-final in that season, which they lost to Evesham Town 4–2.

=== Darlington ===
He signed professionally for local club Darlington for the 1923–24 season, joining his brother Bill, who was already a Quakers player. The pair were key members of the team which won the Third Division North Championship in the 1924–25 season to put Darlington in the Second Division for the first time in their history. Mark Hooper scored 11 goals from the right wing during that promotion campaign and bettered it with 18 the following year in Division Two. On 27 March 1926 of that season Darlington beat Second Division Champions elect Sheffield Wednesday 5–1 at Feethams with Mark Hooper having an exceptional match, a performance which undoubtedly influenced the future direction of his career.

The following season Darlington struggled in Division Two and would eventually be relegated at the end of the season. The Darlington directors decided to change the team midway through the campaign and sell Mark Hooper to Sheffield Wednesday and use the money to purchase Jimmy Waugh, a defender, from Sheffield United. Darlington directors met Sheffield Wednesday officials in York on Friday 21 January 1927 and the deal was done, with Hooper signing for Wednesday for a fee of £1,950. Darlington then added £50 to the fee and promptly signed Waugh for £2,000 to bolster their defence. Hooper knew nothing of this and had to be summoned from a night out at the cinema to be told that he had been sold to Sheffield Wednesday.

=== Sheffield Wednesday ===
Hooper made his Sheffield Wednesday debut the following day on 22 January 1927 in a 2–2 draw with Leicester City at Hillsborough. He played 15 games in the remainder of that season scoring two goals. The following season, he netted 22 goals for Wednesday (a record at the time for a winger) as he finished as top scorer and played a vital part in Wednesday's "Great Escape" season of 1927–28. Towards the end of that season he was joined at the club by left winger Ellis Rimmer and the pair were feted as one of the best pair of extreme wingers in the game. Another accolade often aimed at Hooper in his time at Wednesday was that he was "the best uncapped winger in the country", during his best years he was kept out of the England side by Derby County's fine right winger Sammy Crooks.

Hooper was a consistent performer and remained injury free for much of his career. Between April 1928 and April 1932 he amassed 189 consecutive League and Cup matches for Sheffield Wednesday to create a new record for the club. This record stood for 55 years, until February 1987 when it was beaten by Martin Hodge. In the 1928–29 and 1929–30 seasons Hooper was an ever-present as Wednesday lifted back to back Division One championships. He played in Sheffield Wednesday's 2–1 defeat by Arsenal in the Charity Shield at Stamford Bridge in October 1930. In 1933–34 he was joint top scorer with 13 goals along with Neil Dewar and Harry Burgess as Wednesday finished outside of the top three in Division One for the first time in five seasons. In 1935 he won a FA Cup winners medal as Wednesday beat West Bromwich Albion 4–2 in the final. Hooper scored the second goal for the Owls with a shot that went in off the post. He also played as Wednesday won the 1935 FA Charity Shield.

Hooper lost his place in the Wednesday team after suffering relegation from the top division in 1937. A knee injury led to a cartilage operation in May 1937 and he only made eight appearances in 1937–38 and none the following season as he became player-coach of the A team. His last game for the first team was on 7 May 1938 against Spurs. Mark Hooper left Wednesday to join Rotherham United in May 1939 just before the outbreak of World War II, he amassed a total of 423 games for Sheffield Wednesday in all competitions and is tenth on the all-time list of appearances. He scored 136 goals and is fifth on the all-time list of goalscorers for the club.

=== Rotherham United ===
Hooper joined Rotherham as a player-coach at the age of 37, none of his three league appearances for the club in the 1939–40 campaign have been officially recorded as the season was abandoned with the outbreak of the war. He did return after the war and play three FA Cup matches for the club as Rotherham reached the 4th round before losing to Barnsley in January 1946. He remained at Rotherham until 1958 as a coach.

== After football ==
Mark Hooper opened a tobacconist and confectionery shop on Middlewood Road, just 200 metres from the Sheffield Wednesday ground in the early 1930s whilst still a Wednesday player. He kept the shop going throughout his coaching time with Rotherham and it remained open until the 1970s. Mark Hooper died on 9 March 1974 in Sheffield, aged 72.

== Honours ==
Sheffield Wednesday

- FA Cup: 1934–35
