= Millership =

Millership is a surname. Notable people with the surname include:

- Harry Millership (1889–1959), British footballer
- Walter Millership (1910–1978), British footballer
