= 1939–40 FA Cup =

Tournament details
- Country: England

The 1939–40 FA Cup was an abandoned season of the world's oldest football cup competition, the Football Association Challenge Cup, commonly known as the FA Cup. The competition began as the 65th season of the competition, but was abandoned after just the first round of qualifying matches, due to the start of World War II.

== Suspension ==
The 1939–40 FA Cup began on 2 September 1939, the day after Germany had invaded Poland. On 3 September the United Kingdom declared war with Germany and its allies. The FA suspended the FA Cup on 7 September, until further notice; on 21 September it was announced that all organised football was cancelled for the duration of the war, with only friendly and regional competitions permitted. All results to date in the 1939-40 season were declared null and void.

The Football League War Cup began in October 1939. Organised by the Football League, this was the only national-level competition during the war. Alongside this, the Wartime League or regionalised competitions provided regular football for players and fans during the war.

== Extra-Preliminary Round ==
62 ties were scheduled for 2 September 1939. The results of several matches are missing, but it is not known if these were simply not played, or if the results went unrecorded as it quickly became apparent that the competition would not be continued.

Of the teams involved, this was the only FA Cup appearance for Holiday's Sports, Cheadle and Esso. Norwich Electricity Works withdrew before playing a game, in what would have otherwise been their only appearance.

| Home team | Score | Away team |
|---|---|---|
| Amble | 8-4 | Chopwell Colliery |
| Annfield Plain | 5-0 | Gosforth and Coxlodge |
| Ashington | 2-1 | Whitley & Monkseaton |
| Birtley | 2-1 | Trimdon Grange Colliery |
| Crookhall Colliery Welfare | 1-1 | Newcastle West End |
| Reyrolles | 5-2 | Shankhouse |
| Throckley Welfare | 1-2 | Scotswood |
| Usworth Colliery | 5-1 | Dawdon Colliery Recreation |
| Holiday's Sports | 2-0 | Brandon Social |
| Washington Chemical Works | 2-1 | Chilton Colliery Recreation |
| Buxton | 4-0 | Wilmslow Albion |
| Moulton Verdin | v | Middlewich Athletic |
| Nantwich | v | Haslington Villa |
| Willaston White Star | v | Cheadle |
| Armthorpe Welfare | 5-0 | Rossington Main |
| Bentley Colliery | 1-1 | Meltham Mills |
| Brodsworth Main Colliery | 4-3 | Bradford Rovers |
| Goole Town | 8-1 | Luddendenfoot |
| Grimethorpe Rovers | 4-2 | Ossett Town |
| Guiseley | 1-3 | Rawmarsh Welfare |
| Ravensthorpe | v | Farsley Celtic |
| Upton Colliery | 3-5 | South Kirkby Colliery |
| Worksop Town | 1-0 | Pilkington Recreation |
| Norwich Y.M.C.A | w/o | Norwich Electricity Works |
| Clapton | 4-2 | Dagenham Town |
| Harwich and Parkeston | v | Esso |
| Berkhamsted Town | 1-2 | Barnet |
| Stevenage Town F.C. | v | Bushey United |
| London Caledonians | v | Enfield |
| Epping Town | 1-3 | Ware |
| Harlow Town | 2-3 | Welwyn Garden City |
| Kings Langley | v | Hertford Town |
| Harrow Town | 0-3 | Finchley |
| Saffron Walden | v | Leavesden |
| St Albans City | 6-1 | Bishop's Stortford |
| Tufnell Park | v | Pinner |
| Wealdstone | 7-3 | Old Johnians |
| Civil Service | v | Lyons Club |
| Hounslow Town | 0-3 | Wycombe Wanderers |
| Maidenhead United | 4-0 | Yiewsley |
| Newbury Town | 1-2 | Bicester Town |
| Osberton Radiator | 3-5 | Pressed Steel |
| Oxford City | v | Headington United |
| Redford Sports | v | Uxbridge |
| Marlow | v | Slough |
| Camberley and Yorktown | v | Post Office Engineers |
| Egham | 0-12 | Woking |
| Banstead Mental Hospital | v | Kingstonian |
| Vickers Armstrong | v | Guildford |
| Walton-On-Thames | 2-1 | Leyland Motors |
| Venner Sports | v | Wimbledon |
| Gravesend United | 1-3 | Bexley |
| Maidstone United | 2-2 | Margate |
| RM Deal | v | Whitstable |
| Bournemouth Gasworks Athletic | 4-0 | Bournemouth |
| Fareham | 3-0 | Gosport |
| HMS Victory | v | East Cowes |
| Hamworthy | v | Sherborne |
| Thornycrofts | v | Winchester City |
| Trafalgar Sports | v | Osborne Athletic |
| Calne and Harris United | v | Pewsey YM |
