= Bill Hooper (English footballer) =

English footballer

Personal information
- Full name: Frederick William Hooper
- Date of birth: 14 November 1894
- Place of birth: Darlington, England
- Date of death: 1982 (aged 87–88)
- Place of death: Darlington, England
- Height: 5 ft 7 1/2 in (1.71 m)
- Position: Inside forward

Senior career*
Years	Team	Apps	(Gls)
- Cockfield
- Rise Carr
1919–1920	Oldham Athletic	5	(1)
1920–1926	Darlington (Note: Figures include appearances and goals in the Football League only, not those from the 1919–20 North Eastern League season.)	141	(60)
1926–1927	Rochdale	20	(1)
- Consett
- * Club domestic league appearances and goals

Frederick William Hooper (14 November 1894 – 1982) was an English professional footballer who scored 62 goals from 166 appearances in the Football League, playing for Oldham Athletic, Darlington and Rochdale. An inside forward, he scored Darlington's first Football League goal.

== Personal life ==
Hooper was born in Darlington, County Durham, where his father worked in the local rolling mills. His younger brother Mark played 500 matches in the Football League and won two First Division titles and one FA Cup with Sheffield Wednesday. Two other brothers, Carl and Danny, also played League football, and an uncle, Charlie Roberts, captained Manchester United and played for England. Hooper's two sisters, Sarah and Betty, were members of various Darlington-based women's teams that played charity matches in the 1920s and 1930s, raising money for causes including the National Union of Railwaymen's Orphans Fund.

In 1973, Hooper was interviewed by David Frost for an edition of The Frost Programme focussing on Darlington F.C. as an illustration of the unglamorous end of football, described 40 years later by the Northern Echo as "an insight into a town's heart-aching relationship with its football club, and a reminder of the ridiculous resilience of optimism". Hooper died in Darlington in late 1982.

== Football career ==
Hooper played for Cockfield and for Darlington club Rise Carr before the First World War interrupted his progress. After the war, he played five times for First Division club Oldham Athletic, where his older brother Danny was also on the books. He then returned home and signed for Darlington. He and Tommy Winship were instrumental in Darlington finishing as runners-up in the North Eastern League, which led to their inclusion in the newly formed Football League Third Division North.

On the opening day of the season, 27 August 1921, Darlington played Halifax Town at home, and beat them 2–0. After "barely a minute", Winship crossed for Hooper to score Darlington's first goal in the Football League; the goal came so quickly that the Northern Echo reported how Hooper could "in all probability, lay claim to the honour of being the first player to score a goal in the Northern Section of the Third Division". He finished the season as Darlington's top scorer, with 18 goals from 31 games, as the club finished in second place in the division.

Three seasons later, playing alongside younger brother Mark, Hooper contributed to Darlington's Third Division North title and promotion to the Second Division. After one season at the higher level, in which Darlington's 15th place remains, as of 2020, their best ever finish, Hooper left the club and became one of several new recruits to the forward line of ambitious Third Division club Rochdale. He played 20 League matches, his only goal coming in a 3–1 defeat of Wrexham, in 1926–27, which was his final season in the Football League.
