= Charlie Roberts (footballer) =

English footballer (1883–1939)

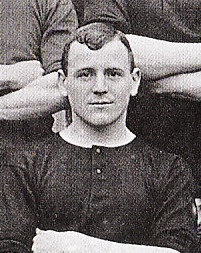

Personal information
- Full name: Charles Roberts
- Date of birth: 6 April 1883
- Place of birth: Rise Carr, Darlington, England
- Date of death: 7 August 1939 (aged 56)
- Place of death: Manchester, England
- Height: 1.83 m (6 ft 0 in)
- Position: Centre-half

Youth career
- Rise Carr Rangers

Senior career*
Years	Team	Apps	(Gls)
- Darlington St Augustine's
- Bishop Auckland
1903–1904	Grimsby Town	31	(4)
1904–1913	Manchester United	271	(22)
1913–1915	Oldham Athletic	72	(2)
Total		374	(28)

International career
1905	England	3	(0)
1905–1914	Football League XI	9	(?)

Managerial career
- 1921–1922: Oldham Athletic
- * Club domestic league appearances and goals

Charles Roberts (6 April 1883 – 7 August 1939) was an English professional footballer who played as a centre-half in the Football League for Grimsby Town, Manchester United and Oldham Athletic. He spent nine years at United, where he was captain, helping the club to two First Division titles and an FA Cup. He won three caps for England in 1905.

== Playing career ==
Born in Darlington, Roberts started his football career with Bishop Auckland, but soon moved to Grimsby Town.

In 1904, he was transferred to Manchester United for £600. The United manager at the time was Ernest Mangnall who had embarked on a spending spree which would later see Manchester City players Billy Meredith and Sandy Turnbull arrive at Bank Street, United's ground at the time. Roberts arrival at United was extremely important to the development of the club; a strong, skilful, fast centre half and a rebel to boot. He flouted FA rules by wearing his shorts above the knee and was politically minded in favour of the unionisation of professional footballers.

Playing as centre-half he helped Manchester United win the 1908 and 1911 league titles as well as the 1909 FA Cup. Not until 1983, when a United side captained by Bryan Robson lifted the FA Cup for the fifth time, did another Englishman captain the club to FA Cup glory, as United's captains of their second and third triumphs were both Irish and their fourth FA Cup winning side was captained by a Scotsman. He left the club in August 1913 for a then record fee of £1,500 to Oldham Athletic, who he also went on to manage, after appearing in 299 matches and scoring 23 goals for United.

Roberts was capped three times for England in 1905, Manchester United's first England international.

== Players' Union ==
On 2 December 1907, Roberts and Meredith were instrumental in setting up the Players' Union. The organisation was not recognised by the FA but it did attract considerable support from fellow League clubs. In August 1909, the FA threatened to suspend any player who admitted to being a member of the Union, following which Roberts and his Manchester United's teammates were summoned to a meeting with the club's management. The players refused to relinquish their Union membership, forcing the club to contact their first opponents of the new season, Bradford City to cancel the fixture, as it could not field a team. The FA's threat had seen the membership of the Union fall so that the only members were the Manchester United players, who called themselves "The Outcasts". It was only after Tim Coleman of Everton renewed his support by siding with The Outcasts that the FA relented and Roberts' Union was saved.

== Coaching career ==
In 1928, together with former colleague Billy Meredith, he became a coach for the ambitious Manchester Central. Roberts' son, Charlie Jr., was a player for Central's first season.

He died, aged 56, at Manchester Royal Infirmary in August 1939 following a cranial operation after suffering extended "dizzy spells".

== Personal life ==
Roberts' cousin, Harry Hooper, played at full-back for Southampton, Leicester City and Queens Park Rangers. His nephews, Danny, Bill, Mark and Carl Hooper, were all professional footballers, and his nieces, Sarah and Bessie Hooper, played for Darlington Quaker Ladies. His great-great-granddaughter, Lucy Roberts, played for Manchester United W.F.C. in their inaugural season.

== Honours ==
Manchester United

- Football League First Division: 1907–08, 1910–11
- FA Cup: 1908–09

Individual

- English Football Hall of Fame: 2017
