= Dinnington Athletic F.C. =

Dinnington Athletic
- Full name: Dinnington Athletic Football Club
- Founded: 1928
- Dissolved: 1974

Dinnington Athletic F.C. was the name of an English football club based in Dinnington, Rotherham, South Yorkshire.

== History ==
The club was formed in 1928 and quickly overtook Dinnington Main as the prominent club in the village. They initially played in the Worksop & District League but soon moved to the Sheffield Association League. They won the prestigious Sheffield & Hallamshire Senior Cup in 1932 by beating South Kirkby Colliery in Mexborough.

Their finest hour came in the 1934–35 season, when they won the Association League and reached the 1st round of the FA Cup, losing 1–3 to Chester. The club decided to join the Yorkshire League in 1936, but three years later the Second World War broke out and the league was suspended. After hostilities ended Athletic re-joined the Association League before the Yorkshire League was re-started in 1949. They were promoted to Division One in 1950 but resigned from the league a year later after finishing third from bottom of the table.

Throughout the 1950s and 1960s they competed in local Worksop and Sheffield leagues before rejoining the Yorkshire League in 1969. This latest spell in the competition would again only be a short one – after winning the Division 2 title in 1970 they would last only four more years before resigning from the competition and disbanding.

=== Notable former players ===
Players that have played in the Football League either before or after playing for Dinnington Athletic –

- Alf Hale
- Geoff Marlow
- John Nock
- Wally Quinton

=== League and cup history ===
Dinnington Athletic League and Cup history
Season	Division	Position	FA Cup	FA Trophy
1929–30	Worksop Senior League	/6	-	-
1931–32	Sheffield Association League		-	-
1932–33	Sheffield Association League		1st qualifying round	-
1933–34	Sheffield Association League		4th qualifying round	-
1934–35	Sheffield Association League	1st	1st round	-
1935–36	Sheffield Association League		Preliminary round	-
1936–37	Yorkshire League	9th/19	2nd qualifying round	-
1937–38	Yorkshire League	4th/20	1st qualifying round	-
1938–39	Yorkshire League	10th/20	Extra preliminary round	-
1946–47	Sheffield Association League	/18	1st qualifying round	-
1947–48	Sheffield Association League	/20	Extra preliminary round	-
1948–49	Sheffield Association League	/20	2nd qualifying round	-
1949–50	Yorkshire League Division 2	4th/18	Preliminary round	-
1950–51	Yorkshire League Division 1	16th/18	-	-
1951–52	Worksop & District League	/12	-	-
1955–56	Worksop & District League	/11	-	-
1956–57	Worksop & District League	/7	-	-
1957–58	Worksop & District League	/11	-	-
1969–70	Yorkshire League Division 2	1st/18	-	-
1970–71	Yorkshire League Division 2	7th/14	2nd qualifying round	1st qualifying round
1971–72	Yorkshire League Division 2	12th/15	-	1st qualifying round
1972–73	Yorkshire League Division 2	14th/16	-	-
1973–74	Yorkshire League Division 2	11th/16	-	-

== Honours ==
=== League ===
- Yorkshire League Division Two
  - Champions: 1969–70
  - Promoted: 1949–50
- Yorkshire League Division Three
  - Promoted: 1973–74, 1976–77 (champions)

=== Cup ===
- Sheffield & Hallamshire Senior Cup
  - Winners: 1931–32
  - Runners-up: 1946–47, 1969–70
- Aston-cum-Aughton Charity Cup
  - Winners: 1928–29, 1935–36

== Records ==
- Best FA Cup performance: 1st round, 1934–35
- Best FA Trophy performance: 1st qualifying round, 1970–71, 1971–72
