= Joe Robson (footballer, born 1899) =

English footballer (1899–1961)

Personal information
- Full name: Joseph William Robson
- Date of birth: 26 October 1899
- Place of birth: Ryhope, England
- Date of death: 7 November 1961 (aged 62)
- Place of death: Silksworth, England
- Height: 5 ft 10 in (1.78 m)
- Positions: Half back; left back

Senior career*
Years	Team	Apps	(Gls)
- Marsden Rescue
1920–1923	South Shields	21	(0)
1923–1924	Southend United	5	(0)
1924–1925	Durham City	58	(1)
1925	Rochdale	4	(0)
1925–1928	Lincoln City	60	(1)
1928–1929	Durham City		
- Pegswood United
- Horden Colliery Welfare
- Blyth Spartans
- Ashington
- Bedlington United
- Pegswood United
- Seaton Burn Welfare
- Burradon Colliery Welfare
- Newbiggin West End

International career
1913	England schoolboys	2	(0)
- * Club domestic league appearances and goals

Joseph William Robson (26 October 1899 – 7 November 1961) was an English footballer who made 148 appearances in the Football League playing for South Shields, Southend United, Durham City, Rochdale and Lincoln City. He played at centre half, left half or left back.

== Life and career ==
Robson was born in 1899 in Ryhope, County Durham, a younger son of Emma Louise Robson and her husband, Frederick, who was variously employed as a labourer in a carpet works, a fireman in a papermill, and a colliery labourer. An older brother, Fred, also became a professional footballer. Robson attended Hendon Board School, and played for the Sunderland Schools football team that reached the final of the English Schools' Shield in 1913. They lost 2–1 to Watford Schools after a replay, in which Watford's second goal was an own goal scored by Robson when he back-heeled a cross into his own net. He represented England schoolboys twice that year, against their Scottish and Welsh counterparts.

He joined Football League Second Division club South Shields from Tyneside League club Marsden Rescue in October 1920. He made his first-team debut on 26 February 1921, playing at left half in a 1–0 win at home to Notts County, and returned to the side for the last eight matches of the season, used mainly at left back. He had a run of games in the first half of the following season, but played just once more before joining Southend United, a previous club of his brother Fred, ahead of the 1923–24 season. He played in four Third Division South matches early in the season, but made only two more first-team appearances, and was granted a free transfer at his own request in January 1924.

Robson returned to the northeast and signed for Durham City of the Third Division North; Fred had joined a few months earlier. In contrast to his Football League career elsewhere, Robson was ever-present for Durham City for what remained of that season and the whole of the next. In his Complete Record and Who's Who, Garth Dykes writes that "in any position in the intermediate line he could be relied upon to put in a workmanlike performance. An untiring worker and a strong tackler, he was the most constructive half on the club's books". He scored his first Football League goal on 13 December 1924 in a 3–1 defeat away to Wrexham, whose goalkeeper "saved well, and was only beaten in the fading light by a long shot from J.W. Robson."

As had been the case the previous season, Robson's contract allowed him to leave on a free transfer. This time he did leave, moving to Rochdale together with Durham team-mate Billy Bertram. Although Bertram stayed, Robson moved on again after four appearances to another Third Division North club, Lincoln City, who had just sold Wally Webster to Sheffield United for a record fee and opted to spend the proceeds on strengthening their half-back line. Lincoln's manager, Horace Henshall, thought Robson "the best half in any Northern Section team", and proceeded to select him, mainly at centre half, for the rest of the season. Robson missed six weeks of the 1926–27 season after suffering an injury in the second match, came back into the side for another two weeks and was dropped for a further six, but once Lincoln were able to field a settled half-back line, with Robson at centre, Alf Basnett on the right and Alf Hale on the left, they found a run of form that included seven consecutive wins in March and April and took the team into mid-table. Robson lost his place at centre half to close-season arrival Charles Foulkes, made just four appearances in the 1927–28 season, and was released on a free transfer.

He again returned to the northeast where he played for a string of non-League clubs: his former employers, Durham City who had failed to be re-elected to the League, Pegswood United, Horden Colliery Welfare and Blyth Spartans. A trial with Third Division Ashington came to nothing, and he returned to non-League with clubs including Bedlington United, Pegswood United, Seaton Burn Welfare, Burradon Colliery Welfare and Newbiggin West End.

The 1939 Register finds Robson living in Dene Street, Sunderland, with his wife, Mary, and two children and working as a boilersmith. He died in Silksworth, County Durham, in 1961 at the age of 62.
