= Danny Hooper =

English footballer

Personal information
- Date of birth: 15 September 1893
- Place of birth: Newton Aycliffe, England
- Date of death: 1973 (aged 79–80)
- Position: Centre-half

Senior career*
Years	Team	Apps	(Gls)
- Darlington Rise Carr
1919–1920	Oldham Athletic	5	(0)
- Shildon Athletic
- Darlington Rise Carr
- Darlington Wednesday
- * Club domestic league appearances and goals

Daniel Hooper (15 September 1893 – 1973) was an English footballer who played as a centre-half in the Football League for Oldham Athletic.

Hooper was born in Newton Aycliffe. His family were from Rise Carr in Darlington, where his father worked in the rolling mills. His uncle, Charlie Roberts, played for England and Manchester United. His brothers, Bill, Mark and Carl, were all professional footballers, and his sisters, Sarah and Bessie, played for Darlington Quaker Ladies.

He played for Darlington Rise Carr before joining Oldham Athletic during the 1919–20 season. He made five League appearances before moving to Shildon Athletic. He later returned to Darlington Rise Carr and went on to play for Darlington Wednesday. He had a trial at Lincoln City during the 1927–28 season. In 1928, he was the subject of controversy when he played for two clubs, beyond his registration.
