= 1935 FA Cup final =

- Event: 1934–35 FA Cup
Sheffield Wednesday	West Bromwich Albion
4	2
- Date: 27 April 1935
- Venue: Wembley Stadium, London
- Referee: Bert Fogg
- Attendance: 93,204

The 1935 FA Cup final was contested by Sheffield Wednesday and West Bromwich Albion at Wembley. Sheffield Wednesday won 4–2, with goals scored by Jack Palethorpe, Mark Hooper and Ellis Rimmer (2). Wally Boyes and Teddy Sandford scored West Brom's goals. It is the most recent time that the trophy has been won by Sheffield Wednesday, and would be their last major trophy win for 56 years, until they won the Football League Cup in 1991.

== Match summary ==
West Brom went into the match as favourites even though they were below Wednesday in the table, pundits believing that they had the better forward players with Wally Boyes, W.G. Richardson and Teddy Sandford all having notched over 20 League goals for the season. The two teams had met in a League game five days earlier, on Easter Monday, and drawn 1–1 at The Hawthorns. Wednesday went into the match with a full strength squad and fielded the same starting eleven that they had for every round except the third, Ellis Rimmer having scored in every round. West Brom brought back Joe Carter, who had been absent with a knee injury since the semi-final, to replace Harry Jones. West Brom also left out Arthur Gale who had played in all six FA Cup ties that season and scored four goals from the right wing. Gale was replaced by Tommy Glidden, who was effectively shackled by Wednesday's left back Ted Catlin.

Wednesday took the lead after just two minutes. A West Brom attack broke down leaving Catlin injured, but the referee Bert Fogg played an advantage and a quick break saw Mark Hooper and Ronnie Starling combine to feed Jack Palethorpe, who hit a right foot shot into the corner of the goal. Albion however started to play some good football and equalised after 21 minutes through the youngest player on the field, 22-year-old Boyes. The diminutive left winger took a pass from Carter and hit a rising drive from the left side of the penalty area past Jack Brown. The score remained at 1–1 until half time.

The early stages of the second half saw Starling miss a chance and then have another effort cleared off the line. Starling was prominent in Wednesday re-taking the lead on 70 minutes when his pass released Hooper, who beat two men before hitting a shot past Harold Pearson that went in off the post. Within five minutes West Brom were level, as a Sandford shot was deflected into the net by Walt Millership. The limping Carter missed two good chances, hitting the post with one of them, and W. G. Richardson also missed a fine opportunity. With five minutes remaining, Rimmer chased a long through ball from Wilf Sharp and the tall winger headed the ball past Pearson and into the net, to continue his record of scoring in every round. In the final minute, Pearson parried a Hooper shot and Rimmer knocked the ball home from close range for his second goal.

=== Aftermath ===
Sheffield Wednesday have not won the FA Cup again since their 1935 triumph; their only major trophy during that time was the Football League Cup in 1991. By this date, there were just two members of Wednesday's FA Cup winning team still alive; captain Ronnie Starling, who died later that year at the age of 82, and Jack Surtees, who died in July 1992 at the age of 81. The last surviving player from the game, Albion's Teddy Sandford, died in May 1995 at the age of 84.

== Match details ==
27 April 1935
15:00 BST

Sheffield Wednesday	4–2	West Bromwich Albion
Palethorpe 2'; Hooper 70'; Rimmer 85' 89'	Report	Boyes 21'; Sandford 75'

Wembley, London
Attendance: 93,204
Referee: Bert Fogg

Sheffield Wednesday	West Bromwich Albion

GK	(England) Jack Brown
RB	(Scotland) Joe Nibloe
LB	(England) Ted Catlin
RH	(Scotland) Wilf Sharp
CH	(England) Walter Millership
LH	(England) Horace Burrows
OR	(England) Mark Hooper
IR	(England) Jack Surtees
CF	(England) Jack Palethorpe
IL	(England) Ronnie Starling (c)
OL	(England) Ellis Rimmer
Manager:
(England) Billy Walker

GK	(England) Harold Pearson
RB	(England) George Shaw
LB	(England) Bert Trentham
RH	(Wales) Jimmy Murphy
CH	(England) Bill Richardson
LH	(England) Jimmy Edwards
OR	(England) Tommy Glidden (c)
IR	(England) Joe Carter
CF	(England) W. G. Richardson
IL	(England) Teddy Sandford
OL	(England) Wally Boyes
Secretary-Manager:
(England) Fred Everiss

Match rules

- 90 minutes.
- 30 minutes of extra-time if necessary.
- Replay if scores still level.

== Road to Wembley ==
Sheffield Wednesday
Home teams listed first. Round 3: Sheffield Wednesday 3–1 Oldham Athletic

Round 4: Wolverhampton Wanderers F.C. 1–2 Sheffield Wednesday

Round 5: Norwich City 0–1 Sheffield Wednesday

Quarter-Final: Sheffield Wednesday 2–1 Arsenal

Semi-Final: Sheffield Wednesday 3–0 Burnley

(at Villa Park, Birmingham)

West Bromwich Albion
Home teams listed first. Round 3: West Bromwich Albion 2–1 Port Vale

Round 4: West Bromwich Albion 7–1 Sheffield United

Round 5: West Bromwich Albion 5–0 Stockport County

Quarter-Final: West Bromwich Albion 1–0 Preston North End

Semi-Final: West Bromwich Albion 1–1 Bolton Wanderers

(at Elland Road, Leeds)
Replay: West Bromwich Albion 2–0 Bolton Wanderers
(at Victoria Ground, Stoke-on-Trent)
