= John Nock (footballer, born 1909) =

English footballer

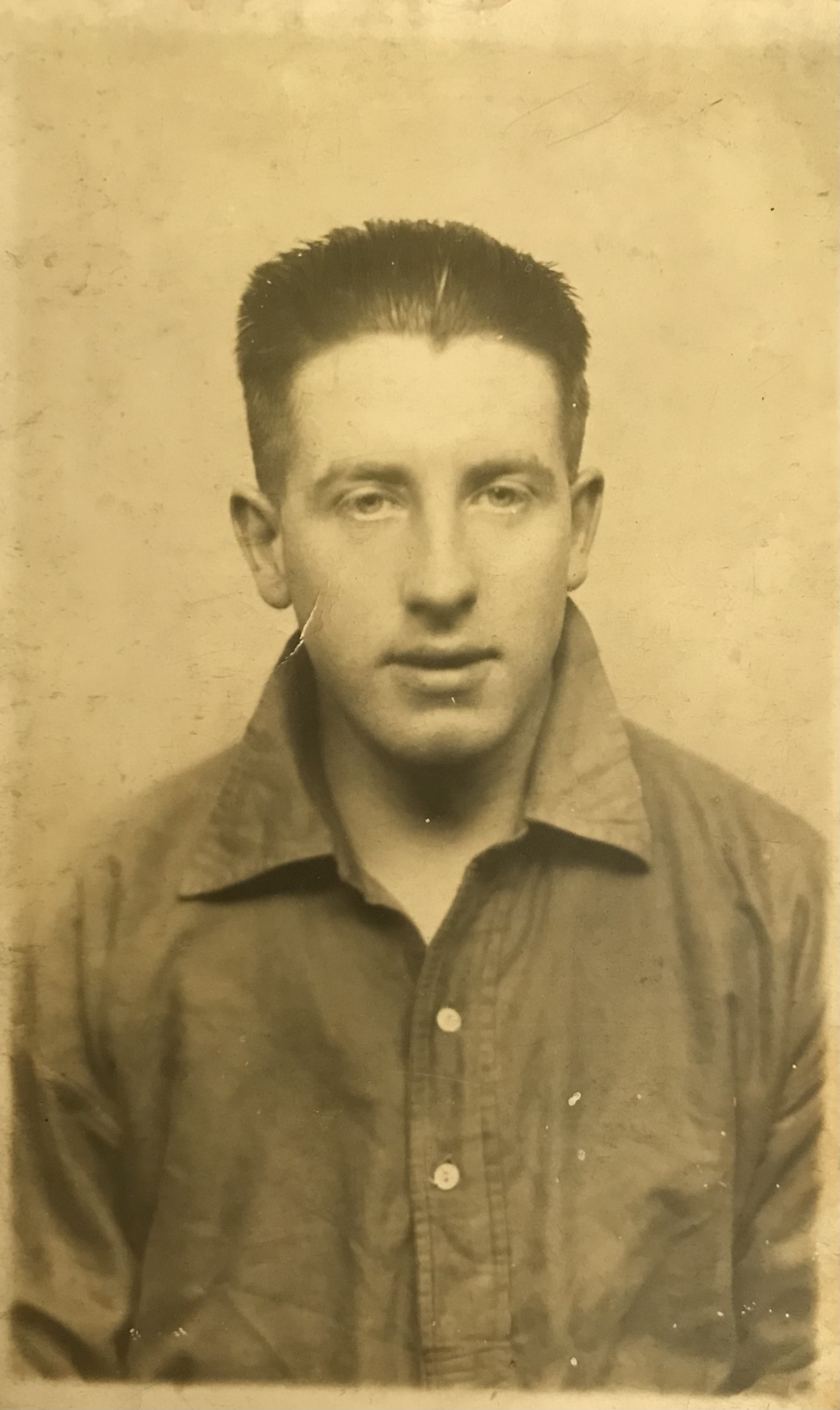

Personal information
- Full name: John Edwin Nock
- Date of birth: 13 January 1909
- Place of birth: Rotherham, England
- Date of death: 1996 (aged 86–87)
- Position: Striker

Senior career*
Years	Team	Apps	(Gls)
- Dinnington Athletic
- Silverwood Colliery
1931–1933	Rotherham United	25	(15)
1933–1934	Scarborough		
- Bacup Borough
1934–?	Accrington Stanley	1	(0)
1934–35	Rossendale United	6	(3)
- * Club domestic league appearances and goals

John Edwin Nock (13 January 1909 – 1996) was an English footballer.

He played for Dinnington Athletic, Silverwood Colliery, Rotherham United, Scarborough, Bacup Borough, Accrington Stanley and Rossendale United.
