= Teddy Sandford =

English footballer (1910–1995)

Personal information
- Full name: Edward Albert Sandford
- Date of birth: 22 October 1910
- Place of birth: Handsworth, Birmingham, England
- Date of death: 13 May 1995 (aged 84)
- Place of death: West Bromwich, England
- Height: 5 ft 9 in (1.75 m)
- Position: Inside forward

Youth career
- 1929–1930: West Bromwich Albion (amateur)

Senior career*
Years	Team	Apps	(Gls)
1930–1939	West Bromwich Albion	286	(67)
1939–1941	Sheffield United	5	(1)
1941–1943	Morris Commercial		

International career
1932	England	1	(0)
- * Club domestic league appearances and goals

Edward Albert Sandford (22 October 1910 – 13 May 1995) was an English footballer who played as an inside forward. During his professional career from 1930 to 1943 he represented West Bromwich Albion, Sheffield United, Morris Commercial and made one appearance for the England national team.

== Early life ==
Sandford was born in Handsworth, Birmingham at a tea room run by his father. Two of his uncles, Abe Jones and Billy Jones, were noted footballers.

== Club career ==
As a youth he played football for Tantany Athletic, Overend Wesley, Birmingham Carriage Works and Smethwick Highfield. In October 1929, while still an amateur, he joined West Bromwich Albion, the club that his uncle Abe Jones had represented between 1896 and 1901.

Sandford turned professional in May 1930 and scored on his senior debut in November of the same year when Albion beat Preston North End 3–2 in a Division Two match. During his first season, he was part of the Albion side that won promotion to the First Division and that also beat Birmingham 2–1 in the 1931 FA Cup Final.

Sandford scored for West Bromwich Albion in the 1935 FA Cup Final.

He joined Sheffield United for £1,500 in 1939, and scored once from five appearances in the 1938–39 Second Division, before finishing his career with Morris Commercial, retiring in May 1943.

== International career ==
In November 1932 he won his only England cap, in a 0–0 draw with Wales at Wrexham. He was called up a number of other times as a reserve player.

== Later life and death ==
Sandford returned to West Bromwich Albion in the late 1940s, serving as a coach and scout. After retiring from playing, he joined his father at the family-run tea room. In later life Sandford lived in Great Barr, Birmingham. He died in Sandwell General Hospital, West Bromwich, in May 1995 following a stroke.

== Personal life ==
Sandford married Lily Smith in 1937 at St James Church in Handsworth. He had a son, Russell, who played non-League football for Moor Green while working as a teacher.

== Honours ==
West Bromwich Albion

- FA Cup: 1930–31; runner-up: 1934–35
