= Martin Hodge =

English footballer

Personal information
- Full name: Martin Hodge
- Date of birth: 4 February 1959 (age 67)
- Place of birth: Southport, England
- Height: 6 ft 2 in (1.88 m)
- Position: Goalkeeper

Senior career*
Years	Team	Apps	(Gls)
1977–1979	Plymouth Argyle	43	(0)
1979–1983	Everton	25	(0)
1981–1982	→ Preston North End (loan)	28	(0)
1982–1983	→ Oldham Athletic (loan)	4	(0)
1983	→ Gillingham (loan)	4	(0)
1983	→ Preston North End (loan)	16	(0)
1983–1988	Sheffield Wednesday	197	(0)
1988–1991	Leicester City	75	(0)
1991–1993	Hartlepool United	69	(0)
1993–1994	Rochdale	42	(0)
1994–1996	Plymouth Argyle	17	(0)
Total		520	(0)
- * Club domestic league appearances and goals

Martin Hodge (born 4 February 1959) is an English former professional footballer. He is the current Head of Recruitment at Premier League club Hull City.

Born in Southport, Lancashire, he played as a goalkeeper for Plymouth Argyle, Everton, Sheffield Wednesday, Leicester City, Hartlepool United, and Rochdale. His career lasted from 1977 to 1996 during which time he played 602 league and cup matches.

== Football career ==
Hodge was spotted by Plymouth Argyle while playing for the amateur team Southport Trinity and was given a trial by the Devon club. He signed as an apprentice for Argyle, and graduated through their youth scheme to make his debut during the 1977–78 season. He signed as a professional in February 1977, as he turned 18 years old. He played five times during 1977–78 and then forced his way into the first team to be the regular goalkeeper for 1978–79. Argyle had a pretty average season in Division Three that year but Hodge's form caught the eye of Everton and he signed for them in July 1979 for a fee of £135,000. The 20-year-old Hodge had been signed by Everton as second choice keeper to George Wood, however Hodge forced his way into the first team in November 1979 with his good early form and played 23 league matches that season plus an FA Cup semi-final against West Ham United. After that first season Hodge's opportunities were limited by the arrival of Neville Southall and he had spells on loan at Preston North End, Oldham Athletic and Gillingham before moving to Sheffield Wednesday in the summer of 1983 in a £50,000 deal.

Hodge was a typical signing by the then Wednesday manager Howard Wilkinson in that he was a player who had shown early promise but had lost his way somewhat. Hodge was not expected to be first choice for Wednesday for the 1983–84 season with Iain Hesford expected to be number one goalkeeper. However a combination of Hodge's good pre season form and Hesford' weight problems ensured that Hodge played the opening match of the season against Swansea City and never looked back. His time at Sheffield Wednesday was excellent he played 214 consecutive League and Cup matches, a club record beating Mark Hooper's previous record of 189 and was part of the Wednesday side which gained promotion back to Division One in 1983–84 and then had several good seasons on their return to the top flight.

In total Hodge played 246 times for Wednesday and kept 60 clean sheets before leaving for Leicester City in March 1988, he is remembered at Hillsborough as a fine goalkeeper. Hodge was part of an unusual and rare incident on 25 October 1986 when during the Sheffield Wednesday v Coventry City match, City goalkeeper Steve Ogrizovic scored a freak goal directly from a kick out of his hand with the help of a following wind. This was an embarrassing incident for Hodge and one that he was continually reminded of by fans for many years. Hodge's excellent form at Wednesday made him a favourite to make the England squad for the 1986 World Cup in Mexico and was even measured up for and received a squad blazer. However Hodge cruelly missed out at the last minute when Gary Bailey supposedly recovered from injury only to break down again in Mexico. Hodge has said that this was the biggest disappointment of his career.

Hodge's £250,000 move to Leicester was not a great success, as he tore a stomach muscle in his first match and was out injured for several months. He made 80 appearances in three years before moving to Hartlepool in the summer of 1991, where he stayed for two years before joining Rochdale for a season. In the summer of 1994 he moved back to his first club Plymouth, where he played for two seasons and was also involved in coaching the youth team before retiring from professional football in May 1996.

== Post-playing days ==
In the summer of 1996 Hodge returned to Sheffield Wednesday as goalkeeping coach. He later also took charge of the reserve team before being released by the club in July 2004, when he moved to Leeds United to be their goalkeeping coach. With the advent of new Leeds manager Dennis Wise in October 2006, Martin Hodge was relieved of his duties as goalkeeping coach and left the club.

He has since worked as a scout and head of recruitment for a number of Premier League and Championship clubs including Swansea City. On 21 May 2025, Hull City announced that Hodge had been hired as their new Head of Recruitment.

== Honours ==
Individual

- PFA Team of the Year: 1993–94 Third Division
