= 1939–40 in English football =

Football in England
- Season: 1939–40

Men's football
- Football League First Division: abandoned
- Football League Second Division: abandoned
- FA Cup: abandoned

The 1939–40 season was the 65th season of competitive football in England. It was suspended in September after the outbreak of World War II.

== Overview ==
World War II broke out early into this season. On 4th September the Government announced a ban on Sport to prevent crowds gathering. Over thirty mid-week League fixtures were called-off. Most competitions, including the Football League, were abandoned. The Football League's Scheme for War-time football proposed to limit gates to 8,000 or 15,000 in evacuation areas. With their large overheads, Aston Villa and Sunderland announced their intention to close down.

A few leagues, such as the Northern League, did manage to complete a season, but more than half of the teams were unable to fulfil all their fixtures and resigned.

Blackpool sat at the top of the First Division table at the time the abandonment occurred. The FA Cup Extra-Preliminary Round was played, but with hostilities declared before replays took place, that competition too was abandoned. Entry fees received for the 1939–40 Cup were honoured for the next Cup in 1945–46.

Many footballers signed up to fight in the war and as a result many teams were depleted, and fielded guest players instead. Regional league competitions were set up. Appearances in these tournaments do not count in players' official records. The FA Cup was resumed for the 1945–46 season and The Football League for the 1946–47 season.

== Honours ==
=== Wartime ===
After the abandonment of the football programme, the league was split into ten mini regional leagues. A national cup competition was also held.

Competition	Winner
North West League	Bury
North East League	Huddersfield Town
West League	Stoke City
East Midland League	Chesterfield
Midland League	Wolverhampton Wanderers
South West League	Plymouth Argyle
South A League	Arsenal
South B League	Queens Park Rangers
South C League	Tottenham Hotspur
South D League	Crystal Palace
Football League War Cup	West Ham United

== League tables ==
=== North West League ===
Pos	Team	Pld	W	D	L	GF	GA	GR	Pts
1	Bury	22	16	2	4	64	30	2.133	34
2	Preston North End	22	15	2	5	58	27	2.148	32
3	Blackpool	22	13	6	3	73	36	2.028	32
4	Bolton Wanderers	22	13	4	5	55	30	1.833	30
5	Oldham Athletic	22	11	2	9	55	61	0.902	24
6	Burnley	22	9	5	8	48	43	1.116	23
7	Barrow	22	8	4	10	54	57	0.947	20
8	Blackburn Rovers	22	7	4	11	37	40	0.925	18
9	Rochdale	22	5	5	12	38	58	0.655	15
10	Southport	22	5	4	13	34	62	0.548	14
11	Carlisle United	22	4	4	14	38	68	0.559	12
12	Accrington Stanley	22	2	6	14	31	73	0.425	10

Source: "Season 1939-40". English Football Archive.

=== North East League ===
Pos	Team	Pld	W	D	L	GF	GA	GR	Pts
1	Huddersfield Town	20	15	4	1	54	22	2.455	34
2	Newcastle United	20	12	1	7	59	39	1.513	25
3	Middlesbrough	20	9	4	7	49	42	1.167	22
4	Bradford PA	19	10	2	7	44	38	1.158	22
5	Leeds United	18	9	3	6	36	27	1.333	21
6	Bradford City	19	8	4	7	41	37	1.108	20
7	Hull City	20	8	1	11	35	41	0.854	17
8	York City	20	8	1	11	36	51	0.706	17
9	Darlington	19	6	3	10	44	56	0.786	15
10	Hartlepools United	20	6	1	13	27	47	0.574	13
11	Halifax Town	19	3	2	14	28	53	0.528	8

Source: "Season 1939-40". English Football Archive.

=== West League ===
Pos	Team	Pld	W	D	L	GF	GA	GR	Pts
1	Stoke City	22	13	5	4	57	41	1.390	31
2	Liverpool	22	12	5	5	66	40	1.650	29
3	Everton	22	12	4	6	64	33	1.939	28
4	Manchester United	22	14	0	8	74	41	1.805	28
5	Manchester City	22	12	4	6	73	41	1.780	28
6	Wrexham	22	10	5	7	45	50	0.900	25
7	New Brighton	22	10	3	9	55	52	1.058	23
8	Port Vale	22	10	2	10	52	56	0.929	22
9	Chester	22	7	5	10	40	51	0.784	19
10	Crewe Alexandra	22	6	1	15	44	79	0.557	13
11	Stockport County	22	4	3	15	45	79	0.570	11
12	Tranmere Rovers	22	2	3	17	41	93	0.441	7

Source: "Season 1939-40". English Football Archive.

=== East Midland League ===
Pos	Team	Pld	W	D	L	GF	GA	GR	Pts
1	Chesterfield	20	14	2	4	69	23	3.000	30
2	Barnsley	20	10	5	5	43	29	1.483	25
3	Sheffield United	20	12	1	7	46	34	1.353	25
4	Grimsby Town	20	10	2	8	40	44	0.909	22
5	Mansfield Town	20	9	3	8	49	48	1.021	21
6	Doncaster Rovers	20	7	4	9	37	45	0.822	18
7	Lincoln City	20	9	0	11	42	53	0.792	18
8	Rotherham United	20	7	4	9	24	42	0.571	18
9	Sheffield Wednesday	20	5	5	10	33	42	0.786	15
10	Nottingham Forest	20	5	4	11	37	43	0.860	14
11	Notts County	20	6	2	12	40	57	0.702	14

Source: "Season 1939-40". English Football Archive.

=== Midland League ===
Pos	Team	Pld	W	D	L	GF	GA	GR	Pts
1	Wolverhampton Wanderers	28	19	3	6	76	44	1.727	41
2	West Bromwich Albion	28	18	4	6	87	51	1.706	40
3	Coventry City	28	13	3	12	68	57	1.193	29
4	Birmingham	28	12	5	11	56	60	0.933	29
5	Luton Town	28	10	4	14	76	88	0.864	24
6	Northampton Town	28	7	8	13	48	59	0.814	22
7	Leicester City	28	7	6	15	51	71	0.718	20
8	Walsall	28	7	5	16	51	83	0.614	19

Source: "Season 1939-40". English Football Archive.

=== South West League ===
Pos	Team	Pld	W	D	L	GF	GA	GR	Pts
1	Plymouth Argyle	28	16	4	8	72	41	1.756	36
2	Torquay United	28	14	6	8	73	62	1.177	34
3	Bristol Rovers	28	9	10	9	62	55	1.127	28
4	Newport County	28	12	4	12	70	63	1.111	28
5	Swindon Town	28	10	8	10	66	63	1.048	28
6	Swansea Town	28	10	6	12	54	60	0.900	26
7	Cardiff City	28	6	13	9	45	63	0.714	25
8	Bristol City	28	7	5	16	57	92	0.620	19

Source: "Season 1939-40". English Football Archive.

=== South A League ===
Pos	Team	Pld	W	D	L	GF	GA	GR	Pts
1	Arsenal	18	13	4	1	62	22	2.818	30
2	West Ham United	18	12	1	5	57	33	1.727	25
3	Millwall	18	8	5	5	46	38	1.211	21
4	Watford	18	9	3	6	44	38	1.158	21
5	Norwich City	18	7	6	5	41	36	1.139	20
6	Charlton Athletic	18	8	1	9	61	58	1.052	17
7	Crystal Palace	18	5	3	10	39	56	0.696	13
8	Clapton Orient	18	5	3	10	28	60	0.467	13
9	Tottenham Hotspur	18	5	2	11	37	43	0.860	12
10	Southend United	18	4	0	14	30	61	0.492	8

Source: "Season 1939-40". English Football Archive.

=== South B League ===
Pos	Team	Pld	W	D	L	GF	GA	GR	Pts
1	Queens Park Rangers	18	12	2	4	49	26	1.885	26
2	Bournemouth & Boscombe Athletic	18	11	2	5	52	37	1.405	24
3	Chelsea	18	9	5	4	44	37	1.189	23
4	Reading	18	10	2	6	47	42	1.119	22
5	Brentford	18	8	2	8	42	41	1.024	18
6	Fulham	18	7	4	7	50	51	0.980	18
7	Portsmouth	18	7	2	9	37	42	0.881	16
8	Aldershot	18	5	4	9	38	49	0.776	14
9	Brighton & Hove Albion	18	5	1	12	42	53	0.792	11
10	Southampton	18	4	0	14	41	64	0.641	8

Source: "Season 1939-40". English Football Archive.

=== South C League ===
Pos	Team	Pld	W	D	L	GF	GA	GR	Pts
1	Tottenham Hotspur	18	11	4	3	43	30	1.433	26
2	West Ham United	18	10	4	4	53	28	1.893	24
3	Arsenal	18	9	5	4	41	26	1.577	23
4	Brentford	18	8	4	6	42	34	1.235	20
5	Millwall	18	7	5	6	36	30	1.200	19
6	Charlton Athletic	18	7	4	7	39	36	1.083	18
7	Fulham	18	8	1	9	38	42	0.905	17
8	Southampton	18	5	3	10	28	55	0.509	13
9	Chelsea	18	4	3	11	33	53	0.623	11
10	Portsmouth	18	3	3	12	26	45	0.578	9

Source: "Season 1939-40". English Football Archive.

=== South D League ===
Pos	Team	Pld	W	D	L	GF	GA	GR	Pts
1	Crystal Palace	18	13	1	4	64	30	2.133	27
2	Queens Park Rangers	18	10	3	5	38	28	1.357	23
3	Watford	18	7	7	4	41	29	1.414	21
4	Southend United	18	8	3	7	41	37	1.108	19
5	Bournemouth & Boscombe Athletic	18	8	2	8	40	41	0.976	18
6	Aldershot	18	7	3	8	38	36	1.056	17
7	Clapton Orient	18	7	3	8	33	45	0.733	17
8	Norwich City	18	6	4	8	33	36	0.917	16
9	Reading	18	6	2	10	31	42	0.738	14
10	Brighton & Hove Albion	18	2	4	12	30	65	0.462	8

Source: "Season 1939-40". English Football Archive.

== See also ==
- England national football team results (unofficial matches)
