= Walter Boyes =

English footballer

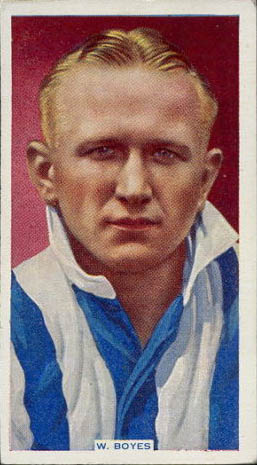
- Boyes displayed on a football card by Godfrey Phillips

Personal information
- Full name: Walter Edward Boyes
- Date of birth: 5 January 1913
- Place of birth: Upperthorpe, England
- Date of death: 16 September 1960 (aged 47)
- Place of death: Sheffield, England
- Height: 5 ft 5 in (1.65 m)
- Position: Outside left

Youth career
- Woodhouse Mills United

Senior career*
Years	Team	Apps	(Gls)
1931–1938	West Bromwich Albion	151	(35)
1938–1949	Everton	66	(11)
1949–1950	Notts County	3	(1)
1950–1951	Scunthorpe United	13	(2)

International career
1935–1938	England	3	(0)
- * Club domestic league appearances and goals

Walter Edward Boyes (5 January 1913 – 16 September 1960) was an English footballer who earned three caps for the national team between 1935 and 1938. He played club football for West Bromwich Albion, Everton, Notts County and Scunthorpe United.

== Biography ==
Boyes was born in Upperthorpe, Sheffield. After playing for Sheffield Boys and Woodhouse Mills United, he turned professional with West Bromwich Albion in February 1931. He scored in the 4–2 1935 FA Cup Final defeat to Sheffield Wednesday, the club he supported as a boy. In February 1938 Boyes joined Everton for a £6000 fee and instantly formed a great left wing partnership with Alex Stevenson, which helped the side clinch the 1938/39 league title.

During the Second World War, he appeared as a guest player for Aldershot, Brentford, Clapton Orient, Leeds United, Manchester United, Middlesbrough, Millwall, Newcastle United, Preston North End and Sunderland.

In June 1949, Boyes took up the role of player-coach at Notts County. He was Scunthorpe United's player-trainer between 1950 and 1953. He later became player-manager at Retford Town (1954) and Hyde United (1958). Boyes joined Swansea Town as trainer in 1959, but retired due to illness in May of the following year.

== Honours ==
West Bromwich Albion

- FA Cup runner-up: 1934–35
