= Geoff Marlow =

English footballer and cricketer

Personal information
- Full name: Geoffrey Arthur Marlow
- Date of birth: 13 December 1914
- Place of birth: Worksop, England
- Date of death: 8 November 1978 (aged 63)
- Place of death: Lincoln, England
- Position: Outside forward

Senior career*
Years	Team	Apps	(Gls)
–	Dinnington Athletic		
1937–1949	Lincoln City	80	(26)
1949	Newark Town		
1949–1950	Grantham		
–	Stalybridge Celtic		
–	Skegness Town		
- * Club domestic league appearances and goals

Geoffrey Arthur Marlow (13 December 1914 – 8 November 1978) was an English professional footballer who scored 20 goals from 86 appearances in the Football League playing as a winger for Lincoln City either side of the Second World War. He also played in the Minor Counties Cricket Championship for Lincolnshire.

== Career ==
Marlow was born in Worksop, Nottinghamshire. He began his football career with Dinnington Athletic before joining Lincoln City. He made his first-team debut on 28 October 1937 in a 7–2 defeat in the Third Division North Cup against Doncaster Rovers, and played his first game in the Football League in the same season. His career was interrupted by the Second World War. When available, he continued to play for Lincoln in the wartime competitions, and resumed his league career on the opening day of the first post-war season, by which time he was 32. He helped the club to the Third Division North title in the 1947–48 season, and played his last game in the Football League on 12 March 1949, in a 1–1 draw against Nottingham Forest in the Second Division. After a short spell with Newark Town, Marlow played a full season with Grantham in the Midland League, helping the club to the final of the Lincolnshire County Cup. He later played for Stalybridge Celtic and Skegness Town.

He also played Minor Counties cricket for Lincolnshire between 1946 and 1957 as an all-rounder, batting in the middle order and opening the bowling.

Marlow died in Lincoln, Lincolnshire, in 1978 at the age of 63.
