= Birmingham Corporation Tramways F.C. =

Birmingham Corporation Tramways
- Full name: Birmingham Corporation Tramways Football Club
- Nickname: the B.C.T.
- Founded: 1905
- Dissolved: 1970
- Ground: Transport Stadium, King's Heath
Home colours

Birmingham Corporation Tramways F.C. was an English association football club.

== History ==
The club was set up as a representative side for Birmingham tram workers and its first recorded match was against the Yardley Tramways at Gravelly Hill in 1905. The club joined the Birmingham & District Wednesday F.A. (for works teams) in 1906. In 1919-20 the club joined the Birmingham Combination league, its best season being 5th in 1922–23.

The corporation hosted a league competition between each depot, and the B.C.T. took part in the National Tramways Shield for public transport sides, winning the shield nine times by 1924.

The club's greatest success was in the 1934-35 FA Cup, in which it won through the qualifying rounds to reach the first round proper. The club was drawn to play Workington away from home, but, having stayed the night in Carlisle before the tie, the club conceded in the first five minutes, and lost the tie 2–0, the second goal being a penalty conceded by B.C.T. left-back Harry Thornton, and scored by his brother. There was some consolation in sharing the match receipts from a crowd of 5,000.

With the re-branding and re-organization of local transport in the city, the club was renamed Birmingham City Transport for 1937–38. The club's last success in the National Tramways Shield before the war came with a 2–0 win over Portsmouth in April 1939, the club's 13th win in 14 finals. The club planned to run two teams in the 1939–40 season, but, with the reduction of tramway services during and after World War 2, the club did not long survive the war at a senior non-league level; in 1950, after finishing bottom of the Combination in consecutive seasons, the club left the Combination., It continued in works leagues and the FA Amateur Cup until at least 1970, when Birmingham City Transport was merged into the West Midlands Passenger Transport Executive and the club absorbed into the new West Midlands Travel F.C.

== Colours ==
The club played in blue shirts with white sleeves, white shorts, and blue socks.

== Ground ==
The club originally played at Boulton Road, near the Tyburn Road works in Gravelly Hill. By 1909, the club was using a ground known as the Stadium in King's Heath, which was renamed the Transport Stadium in 1938, and was the training ground for Birmingham City in the 1950s.

== Notable players ==
- Fred Harris, Birmingham (City) player from 1933 to 1950
