= Fred Robson (footballer) =

English footballer (1892–1960)

Personal information
- Full name: Frederick Robson
- Date of birth: 3 May 1892
- Place of birth: Ryhope, England
- Date of death: 1960 (aged 67–68)
- Position: Full back

Senior career*
Years	Team	Apps	(Gls)
1912–1913	Ryhope Villa		
1913–1919	Southend United		
1919–1922	Swansea Town	76	(0)
1922–1923	Easington Colliery Welfare		
1923–1925	Durham City	77	(5)
1925–1926	Hartlepools United	12	(0)
1926–1927	Durham City	0	(0)
- * Club domestic league appearances and goals

Frederick Robson (3 May 1892 – 1960) was an English professional footballer who made 165 appearances in the Football League playing as a full back for Swansea Town, Durham City and Hartlepools United. He also played in the Southern League for Southend United and for Swansea Town before their election to the Football League. Robson was among the 35 men who enlisted for the Football Battalion at its formation.

== Life and career ==
Robson was born in 1892 in Ryhope, County Durham, a younger son of Emma Louise Robson and her husband, Frederick, who was variously employed as a labourer in a carpet works, a fireman in a papermill, and a colliery labourer. His younger brother, Joe, also became a professional footballer. By the time of the 1911 census, the 18-year-old Fred was serving an apprenticeship in marine engineering.

Robson joined Southern League club Southend United from Ryhope Villa in July 1913. He played for Southend until December 1914, when he attended the meeting at Fulham Town Hall called to raise the 17th (Service) Battalion of the Duke of Cambridge's Own (Middlesex Regiment) – the Football Battalion – and became one of the thirty-five to enlist on the day. When not required for military duties he played as a guest in wartime football for clubs including Sunderland Rovers and Crystal Palace.

After the war, Robson followed Southend manager Joe Bradshaw to another Southern League club, Swansea Town, where he performed well enough to earn selection for the Welsh Southern League clubs in their annual fixture against the English. Swansea were among the Southern League teams absorbed into the newly formed Football League Third Division in 1920, and Robson made his Football League debut at right back in the opening match of the 1920–21 season, a 3–0 defeat away to Portsmouth. He was a regular in the side, apart from a month missed for disciplinary reasons, and played in 76 of the 82 league matches over the next two seasons. He was offered terms for the 1922–23 campaign, but did not re-sign, and spent the following season in non-League football with Easington Colliery Welfare before returning to the Football League with Durham City in August 1923.

He went straight into the Durham side, initially at left back alongside Hugh Elliott and then switching to the right to accommodate Jim Gallagher on the left, and was ever-present in League matches that season. He was appointed captain for 1924–25, playing for much of the time in the same team as his brother Joe, who joined in late October, and was ever-present until injury forced him to miss the last six games. The terms of his contract allowed him to leave after two seasons – he was transfer-listed at a small fee – and he joined Third Division North rivals Hartlepools United. He played at left back in the first 11 matches of the season, but injury cost him his place and he made just four more first-team appearances, three against non-league opposition in the FA Cup and one Football League game in mid-December. He was on the books of his former club Durham City in the 1926–27 season, but did not play for the first team.

The 1939 Register finds Robson living in Hastings Street, Sunderland, with his wife, Alice, and working as a colliery fitter. He died in 1960.

== Career statistics ==
Appearances and goals by club, season and competition
Club	Season	League			FA Cup		Total	
Club	Season	Division	Apps	Goals	Apps	Goals	Apps	Goals
Swansea Town	1920–21	Third Division	35	0	3	0	38	0
Swansea Town	1921–22	Third Division South	41	0	6	0	47	0
Swansea Town	Total		76	0	9	0	85	0
Durham City	1923–24	Third Division North	41	2	3	0	44	2
Durham City	1923–24	Third Division North	36	3	2	0	38	3
Durham City	Total		77	5	5	0	82	5
Hartlepools United	1925–26	Third Division North	12	0	3	0	15	0
Career total			165	5	17	0	182	5
