= Alf Hale =

English footballer

Personal information
- Full name: Alfred Hale
- Date of birth: 24 January 1906
- Place of birth: Kiveton Park, England
- Date of death: December 1972 (aged 66)
- Place of death: Rotherham, Yorkshire, England
- Positions: Left back; left half

Senior career*
Years	Team	Apps	(Gls)
–	Kiveton Park Colliery		
1925–1930	Lincoln City	156	(4)
1930–1932	Luton Town	22	(0)
1932–1934	Llanelly		
1934–1936	Halifax Town	27	(0)
–	Dinnington Athletic		
- * Club domestic league appearances and goals

Alfred Hale (24 January 1906 – December 1972), known as Alf or Pally Hale, was an English professional footballer who made 205 appearances in the Football League playing for Lincoln City, Luton Town and Halifax Town. He played as an outside left. He also played for Welsh League club Llanelly and in non-league football in the Sheffield area. He played at left back or left half.

== Life and career ==
Hale was born in Kiveton Park, Yorkshire, and played football for his local club before joining Football League Third Division North club Lincoln City. He made his debut in September 1925, and over the next five seasons made 167 appearances in league and FA Cup matches, contributing to their runners-up finish in 1927–28. He moved into the Southern Section with Luton Town in the 1930 close season, for whom he played just 22 league matches.

He then signed for club Llanelly, who were playing both in the Southern League and in the Welsh League, which they won in 1932–33. In March 1933, the Daily Mirror reported that Llanelly had received lucrative offers for numerous players, including Hale, but were not allowing them to leave because they hoped to gain admission to the Football League for the next season. They failed in this, and Hale returned to the Third Division North with Halifax Town in 1934. He finished his career back in non-league football with Dinnington Athletic.

Hale died in 1972 at the age of 66.
