= Kathy Malloch =

American nurse

Kathy Malloch is an American nurse who is past president and current boardmember of the Arizona Board of Nursing. She is a nursing scholar, writer, software developer and teacher.

== Education ==
Malloch received a Bachelor of Science in Nursing from the College of Nursing at Wayne State University in 1970, a Master of Business Administration from Oakland University in 1985 and a PhD in nursing from the University of Colorado Denver in 1997.

== Career ==
Her textbook Quantum Leadership co-authored with Tim Porter-O'Grady received the AJN Book of the Year award in 2005 and Managing Success in Healthcare received that honor in 2008. Together with Porter O'Grady she has co-authored six books on healthcare leadership, innovation, and evidence-based practice.

Malloch is a clinical professor with the College of Nursing and Healthcare Innovation at Arizona State University. She is the program director of the Masters in Healthcare Innovation program. Her area of study at Arizona State University is the diffusion of innovations and technology adoption in healthcare.

Malloch is the developer of Expert Nurse Estimation Patient Classification System, or ENEPCS, an automated system that measures clinical workload and provides the number of hours and skill mix required to meet patient needs.

== Publications ==
- Porter-O'Grady, T. & Malloch, K. (2007). Managing for Success in Healthcare; St. Louis: Elsevier.
- Porter-O'Grady, T. & Malloch, K. (2007). (2nd Ed.). Quantum Leadership: A resource for health care innovation. Sudbury, Massachusetts; Jones & Bartlett.
- Malloch, K. & Porter-O'Grady. (2006). An Introduction to Evidence Based Practice for nursing and Healthcare. Sudbury, Massachusetts: Jones & Bartlett.
- Malloch, K. & Krueger, J. (2005). Patient Classification Systems chapter in Dunham-Taylor, J. & Pinczuk, J.Z. Health Care Financial Management for Nurse Managers: Merging the heart with the dollar. Sudbury, Massachusetts: Jones and Bartlett.

== See also ==
- Technology adoption
