= Bert Fogg =

English football referee (1897–1942)

- Full name: Albert Edward Fogg
- Born: March 13, 1897; Bolton, Lancashire England
- Died: December 23, 1942 (aged 45)
Years		Role

Albert Edward Fogg (13 March 1897 – 23 December 1942), known as Bert Fogg, was a football referee from Bolton, Lancashire, who refereed the FA Cup Final in 1935 between Sheffield Wednesday and West Bromwich Albion.

== Run ins with Hughie Gallacher ==
Fogg's name was the cause of an incident when he was refereeing a game involving Hughie Gallacher one day. Gallacher, the Scottish centre-forward, had committed a foul and Fogg booked him and before doing so asked him what his name was. 'What is yours?' asked Gallacher, 'Fogg' replied the referee. 'Aye, and you've been in one all afternoon'. (Tony Mason: The Goalscorers, 1976, p. 48).

Fogg ran into Gallacher early in his Football League career. There was one infamous incident in the Newcastle United v Huddersfield Town game on New Year’s Eve 1927, which ended with Gallacher pushing Fogg into the team bath.

== Internationals ==
Fogg took charge of one England international (v. Wales) in 1927, and two years later, the Scotland v Northern Ireland fixture in Belfast. He also refereed the Dutch national side twice during his career.
