= Carl Hooper (footballer) =

English footballer

Personal information
- Full name: Charles Hooper
- Date of birth: 23 October 1903
- Place of birth: Darlington, County Durham, England
- Date of death: 10 August 1972 (aged 68)
- Place of death: Darlington, County Durham, England
- Position: Inside forward

Senior career*
Years	Team	Apps	(Gls)
–	Darlington		
–	Cockfield		
–	Darlington Railway Athletic		
–	Crook Town		
1925–1926	Lincoln City	34	(6)
–	Shildon		
–	Notts County	0	(0)
1927	York City	6	(2)
–	Chesterfield	3	(0)
–	Willington		
1928–192?	Norwich City	3	(0)
–	Darlington Wire Works		
–	Sheffield Wednesday	0	(0)
–	Worksop Town		
–	West Stanley		
- * Club domestic league appearances and goals

Charles "Carl" Hooper (23 October 1903 – 10 August 1972) was an English footballer who made 40 appearances in the Football League playing for Lincoln City, Chesterfield and Norwich City. He played in non-league football for numerous teams in his native north-east of England, in the Midland League for York City, and was on the books of Notts County and Sheffield Wednesday without representing either in the league. He played as an inside forward.

Hooper's brother Mark played 500 Football League games for Darlington and Sheffield Wednesday, and other brothers Bill and Danny also played league football.
