= Ellis Rimmer =

English footballer

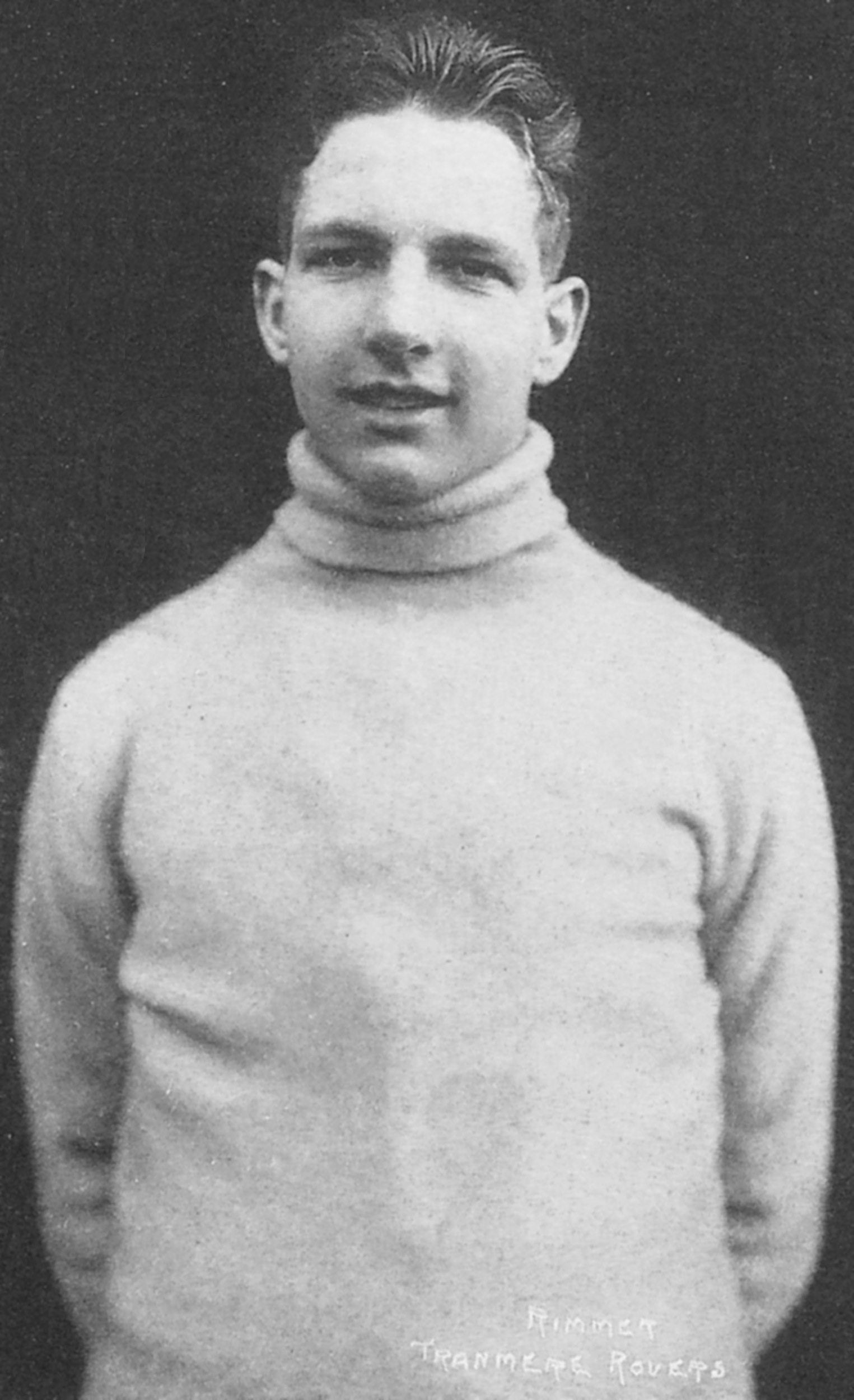
- Rimmer in 1926

Personal information
- Full name: Ellis James Rimmer
- Date of birth: 2 January 1907
- Place of birth: Birkenhead, England
- Date of death: 16 March 1965 (aged 58)
- Place of death: Formby, England
- Position: Outside left

Youth career
- Parkside
- Northern Nomads
- Whitchurch

Senior career*
Years	Team	Apps	(Gls)
1924–1928	Tranmere Rovers	62	(20)
1928–1938	Sheffield Wednesday	382	(122)
1938–1939	Ipswich Town	3	(0)

International career
1930–1931	England	4	(2)
- * Club domestic league appearances and goals

Ellis Rimmer (2 January 1907 – 16 March 1965) was an English professional footballer who played for Tranmere Rovers, Sheffield Wednesday and Ipswich Town. He was a left winger who was quite tall and scored his fair share of headed goals. His career lasted from 1924 until 1939 during which time he played 447 league games, scoring 142 goals, he also played for the England national football team on four occasions.

== Playing career ==
=== Early days ===
Rimmer was born in Birkenhead on 2 January 1907, he played as an amateur for Parkside, Northern Nomads and Whitchurch before signing as a professional for Tranmere Rovers as a 17-year-old in 1924. In his three seasons with Tranmere, Rimmer played briefly with football legends Dixie Dean and Tom 'Pongo' Waring, making 62 league appearances and scoring 20 goals. His good form alerted other clubs and in February 1928 he was signed by Sheffield Wednesday manager Bob Brown for a fee of £3,000.

=== Sheffield Wednesday ===
Sheffield Wednesday were in a grave situation when Rimmer signed for them, they were seven points adrift at the foot of Division One. However Rimmer, who made his Wednesday debut on 25 February 1928 against Newcastle United, was to take part in what has gone down in Sheffield Wednesday history as the "Great Escape" as they picked up 17 points from a possible 20 in their last 10 matches to avoid relegation by a single point. The following two seasons saw Wednesday transformed from relegation strugglers to league winners as they lifted the Division One title in 1928–29 and 1929–30 with Rimmer a virtual ever present on the left wing. He played in Sheffield Wednesday's 2–1 defeat by Arsenal in the Charity Shield at Stamford Bridge in October 1930.

In April 1930 he was called up by England for his first international cap, scoring twice in a 5–2 victory over Scotland in the 1930 British Home Championship. Three other Wednesday players Bill Marsden, Alf Strange and Ernie Blenkinsop all played in that match. Rimmer played a further three international matches, his last being just before his 25th birthday in December 1931 against Spain.

The first two full seasons of the 1930s saw Rimmer net 24 and 23 goals respectively, an excellent effort for a winger whose main job was to provide chances for other players. The 1934–35 season was probably his most memorable as Wednesday lifted the FA Cup with Rimmer netting two late goals in the final against West Bromwich Albion. He scored eight FA Cup goals in total that season and achieved the rare feat of scoring in every round, only twelve players have managed this in the history of English football. He also scored 18 league goals to give him a best ever season tally of 26 and finished as Wednesday's top scorer. He continued to be a regular for Wednesday until March 1938 when Bill Fallon took his place on the left wing. In his 10-year career with Sheffield Wednesday, Rimmer played 418 games in all competitions, scoring 140 goals.

=== Latter career and retirement ===
Rimmer was transferred to Division Three South team Ipswich Town in August 1938, making his debut against Cardiff City on 10 September 1938. He only made four appearances for Ipswich before deciding to retire in January 1939 after playing his last match against Northampton Town in a Southern Section Cup tie.

After retirement Rimmer ran The Hallamshire House, a public house in Sheffield and then in Formby, Merseyside. He died in Formby on 16 March 1965, aged 58.

== Honours ==
Sheffield Wednesday

- Football League First Division: 1928–29, 1929–30
- FA Cup: 1934–35
- Charity Shield: 1935
