= 1970–71 FA Cup qualifying rounds =

Tournament details
- Country: England; Wales

The FA Cup 1970–71 is the 90th season of the world's oldest football knockout competition; The Football Association Challenge Cup, or FA Cup for short. The large number of clubs entering the tournament from lower down the English football league system meant that the competition started with a number of preliminary and qualifying rounds. The 28 victorious teams from the fourth round qualifying progressed to the first round proper.

== Preliminary round ==
=== Ties ===
Tie	Home team	Score	Away team
1	Bishop Auckland	3–0	Boldon Colliery Welfare
2	Burton Albion	1–0	Loughborough United
3	Chichester City	5–2	Horsham
4	Dorking	2–0	Banstead Athletic
5	Fareham Town	1–2	Thornycroft Athletic
6	Fleet Town	0–3	Basingstoke Town
7	Folkestone	4–3	Snowdown Colliery Welfare
8	Gainsborough Trinity	2–1	Sutton Town
9	Gresley Rovers	0–1	Atherstone Town
10	Harwich & Parkeston	1–2	Sudbury Town
11	Hastings United	2–0	Canterbury City
12	Haverhill Rovers	0–7	Gorleston
13	Heanor Town	3–1	Belper Town
14	Highgate United	0–5	Worcester City
15	Lockheed Leamington	1–3	Bromsgrove Rovers
16	Lostock Gralam	0–7	Stalybridge Celtic
17	Marine	2–1	Prescot Town
18	Mossley	0–1	Eastwood Hanley
19	New Mills	0–2	Chorley
20	Northwich Victoria	2–0	Buxton
21	St Neots Town	1–4	Corby Town
22	Stafford Rangers	1–2	Brierley Hill Alliance
23	Tunbridge Wells	2–1	Deal Town
24	Uxbridge	0–0	Bromley
25	Ware	0–1	Grays Athletic
26	Wealdstone	2–0	Hatfield Town
27	Welton Rovers	5–1	Frome Town
28	Woking	2–0	East Grinstead
29	Wolverton Town & B R	1–0	Baldock Town

=== Replay ===
Tie	Home team	Score	Away team
24	Bromley	3–1	Uxbridge

== 1st qualifying round ==
=== Ties ===
Tie	Home team	Score	Away team
1	Alfreton Town	3–1	Arnold
2	Alvechurch	2–0	Bilston
3	Andover	0–1	Bath City
4	Annfield Plain	1–5	Gateshead
5	Aveley	2–1	Braintree & Crittall Athletic
6	Aylesbury United	0–3	Banbury United
7	Bacup Borough	1–3	Droylsden
8	Barnstaple Town	1–7	Bideford
9	Barton Town	1–1	Brigg Town
10	Bedford Town	3–0	Letchworth Town
11	Bedworth United	1–2	Atherstone Town
12	Bexhill Town	1–1	Brett Sports
13	Bexley United	2–2	Hertford Town
14	Biggleswade & District	1–4	Leighton Town
15	Billingham Synthonia	2–4	Whitley Bay
16	Bishop's Stortford	5–3	Canvey Island
17	Bletchley Town	1–0	Witney Town
18	Blyth Spartans	2–1	Willington
19	Bognor Regis Town	2–1	Dorking
20	Boston United	4–0	Holbeach United
21	Bridlington Trinity	1–0	Farsley Celtic
22	Bridport	0–0	Glastonbury
23	Bury Town	0–2	Clacton Town
24	Cambridge City	5–1	Desborough Town
25	Chatham Town	1–4	Gravesend & Northfleet
26	Chesham United	0–1	Cheshunt
27	Cinderford Town	3–2	Gloucester City
28	Clapton	3–0	Feltham
29	Clitheroe	3–1	Fleetwood
30	Coventry Amateurs	1–2	Dudley Town
31	Cowes	1–3	Basingstoke Town
32	Crawley Town	3–0	Haywards Heath
33	Devizes Town	1–5	Poole Town
34	Dover	0–1	Hastings United
35	Dulwich Hamlet	2–2	Addlestone
36	Durham City	0–0	Consett
37	Eastbourne United	1–3	Eastbourne Town
38	Eastwood Town	0–1	Heanor Town
39	Edmonton	1–2	Ford United
40	Ellesmere Port Town	3–0	Eastwood Hanley
41	Ely City	1–2	King's Lynn
42	Evenwood Town	3–0	Tow Law Town
43	Falmouth Town	5–1	Truro City
44	Ferryhill Athletic	3–1	Crook Town
45	Finchley	2–2	Hitchin Town
46	Formby	2–0	Ashton United
47	Frickley Colliery	1–0	Ashby Institute
48	Goole Town	2–1	Yorkshire Amateur
49	Gosport Borough	5–1	Alton Town
50	Great Harwood	5–2	Leyland Motors
51	Great Yarmouth Town	2–2	Gorleston
52	Guildford City	5–0	Epsom & Ewell
53	Halesowen Town	1–2	Bromsgrove Rovers
54	Hampton	0–1	Dartford
55	Hayes	3–0	Harlow Town
56	Hednesford	1–2	Nuneaton Borough
57	Herne Bay	2–1	Ashford Town (Kent)
58	Hinckley Athletic	1–1	Newhall United
59	Hoddesdon Town	1–1	Ilford
60	Horden Colliery Welfare	0–0	Stanley United
61	Hornchurch	3–2	Corinthian Casuals
62	Horwich R M I	2–0	Northwich Victoria
63	Hounslow	0–1	Harrow Borough
64	Hyde United	3–1	Guinness Exports
65	Irthlingborough Diamonds	2–1	Histon
66	Kidderminster Harriers	1–0	Worcester City
67	Kingstonian	2–0	Hemel Hempstead
68	Lancing	1–2	Carshalton Athletic
69	Leatherhead	3–1	Barking
70	Leyton	2–4	Boreham Wood
71	Llanelli	1–0	Barry Town
72	Long Eaton United	1–1	Ilkeston Town
73	Louth United	0–1	Boston Town
74	Maidenhead United	0–1	Dunstable Town
75	March Town United	2–1	Chatteris Town
76	Metropolitan Police	0–1	Erith & Belvedere
77	Minehead	1–1	Bridgwater Town
78	Moor Green	2–2	Lye Town
79	Netherfield	1–3	Lancaster City
80	New Brighton	1–1	Nantwich
81	Newmarket Town	3–3	Lowestoft Town
82	North Shields	2–0	Bishop Auckland
83	Norton Woodseats	7–3	Mexborough Town
84	Oswestry Town	2–0	Kirkby Town
85	Penrith	3–1	Morecambe
86	Porthmadog	6–0	Holyhead Town
87	Prestwich Heys	2–3	Burscough
88	Pwllheli & District	0–6	Rhyl
89	Rawmarsh Welfare	0–1	Dinnington Athletic
90	Retford Town	2–1	Matlock Town
91	Ringmer	5–2	Arundel
92	Romford	11–0	Rainham Town
93	Rothwell Town	1–0	Potton United
94	Rugby Town	0–2	Burton Albion
95	Runcorn	0–2	Winsford United
96	Ryde Sports	0–3	Newport I O W
97	Salisbury	3–0	Portland United
98	Sandbach Ramblers	0–2	Marine
99	Scarborough	1–0	Bridlington Town
100	Selsey	2–4	Chichester City
101	Sheppey United	1–2	Ramsgate Athletic
102	Shildon	3–1	Ryhope Colliery Welfare
103	Sittingbourne	0–5	Maidstone United
104	Skelmersdale United	3–0	Congleton Town
105	Soham Town Rangers	1–0	Rushden Town
106	South Bank	2–2	Washington
107	South Liverpool	1–1	Stalybridge Celtic
108	Southall	2–4	Redhill
109	Southwick	2–3	Littlehampton Town
110	Spalding United	1–1	Skegness Town
111	Spennymoor United	2–0	Bedlington Colliery Welfare
112	St Albans City	2–0	Marlow
113	St Blazey	3–3	Penzance
114	St Helens Town	0–2	Rossendale United
115	Staines Town	0–1	Leytonstone
116	Stamford	2–5	Lincoln United
117	Stevenage Athletic	3–1	Woodford Town
118	Stonehouse	1–2	Merthyr Tydfil
119	Stourbridge	3–0	Brierley Hill Alliance
120	Stratford Town	1–2	Redditch
121	Taunton Town	6–2	Street
122	Thetford Town	1–1	Sudbury Town
123	Tilbury	1–1	Slough Town
124	Ton Pentre	4–1	Abergavenny Thursdays
125	Tonbridge	5–0	Tunbridge Wells
126	Vauxhall Motors	1–2	Tooting & Mitcham United
127	Wadebridge Town	1–3	Saltash United
128	Walthamstow Avenue	1–4	Bromley
129	Walton & Hersham	5–0	Chertsey Town
130	Waterlooville	1–1	Thornycroft Athletic
131	Wellingborough Town	4–1	Corby Town
132	Wembley	0–2	Wealdstone
133	West Auckland Town	1–0	Stockton
134	Westbury United	1–3	Trowbridge Town
135	Weston Super Mare	1–2	Welton Rovers
136	Whitstable Town	2–7	Folkestone
137	Windsor & Eton	0–1	Grays Athletic
138	Winterton Rangers	3–1	Selby Town
139	Wisbech Town	2–1	Bourne Town
140	Witton Albion	4–1	Chorley
141	Wokingham Town	1–3	Cray Wanderers
142	Worksop Town	0–1	Gainsborough Trinity
143	Worthing	0–2	Woking
144	Wycombe Wanderers	8–1	Wolverton Town & B R

=== Replays ===
Tie	Home team	Score	Away team
9	Brigg Town	3–0	Barton Town
12	Brett Sports	0–2	Bexhill Town
13	Hertford Town	1–2	Bexley United
22	Glastonbury	2–0	Bridport
35	Addlestone	1–2	Dulwich Hamlet
36	Consett	1–3	Durham City
45	Hitchin Town	4–1	Finchley
51	Gorleston	2–1	Great Yarmouth Town
58	Newhall United	4–1	Hinckley Athletic
59	Ilford	2–0	Hoddesdon Town
60	Stanley United	1–1	Horden Colliery Welfare
63	Hounslow	2–2	Harrow Borough
72	Ilkeston Town	0–0	Long Eaton United
77	Bridgwater Town	2–3	Minehead
78	Lye Town	2–0	Moor Green
80	Nantwich	0–2	New Brighton
81	Lowestoft Town	3–0	Newmarket Town
106	Washington	1–0	South Bank
107	Stalybridge Celtic	0–2	South Liverpool
110	Skegness Town	1–2	Spalding United
113	Penzance	1–2	St Blazey
122	Sudbury Town	0–1	Thetford Town
123	Slough Town	2–0	Tilbury
130	Thornycroft Athletic	0–0	Waterlooville

=== 2nd replay ===
Tie	Home team	Score	Away team
60	Horden Colliery Welfare	1–2	Stanley United
63	Harrow Borough	1–1	Hounslow
72	Long Eaton United	2–0	Ilkeston Town
130	Waterlooville	1–0	Thornycroft Athletic

=== 3rd replay ===
Tie	Home team	Score	Away team
63	Hounslow	2–3	Harrow Borough

== 2nd qualifying round ==
=== Ties ===
Tie	Home team	Score	Away team
1	Alfreton Town	1–2	Gainsborough Trinity
2	Alvechurch	2–2	Kidderminster Harriers
3	Aveley	3–3	Boreham Wood
4	Banbury United	0–3	Wycombe Wanderers
5	Bath City	3–0	Trowbridge Town
6	Bexhill Town	1–1	Folkestone
7	Bexley United	1–3	Grays Athletic
8	Bideford	3–1	Saltash United
9	Bishop's Stortford	2–1	Bromley
10	Blyth Spartans	6–1	West Auckland Town
11	Boston United	1–0	Lincoln United
12	Bridlington Trinity	0–0	Goole Town
13	Brigg Town	1–1	Dinnington Athletic
14	Burscough	0–3	South Liverpool
15	Cambridge City	2–2	Wellingborough Town
16	Cheshunt	3–1	Stevenage Athletic
17	Cinderford Town	0–1	Ton Pentre
18	Clacton Town	2–0	Thetford Town
19	Clitheroe	0–2	Penrith
20	Crawley Town	3–1	Woking
21	Droylsden	2–3	Witton Albion
22	Dudley Town	1–2	Stourbridge
23	Dunstable Town	1–0	Bletchley Town
24	Eastbourne Town	2–4	Bognor Regis Town
25	Evenwood Town	1–0	Whitley Bay
26	Ferryhill Athletic	1–0	Durham City
27	Ford United	0–2	Leytonstone
28	Glastonbury	1–0	Welton Rovers
29	Gosport Borough	2–3	Waterlooville
30	Gravesend & Northfleet	0–1	Tonbridge
31	Guildford City	2–1	Dulwich Hamlet
32	Harrow Borough	0–7	Dartford
33	Hayes	1–0	Clapton
34	Hitchin Town	1–1	Walton & Hersham
35	Hyde United	0–1	Formby
36	Ilford	3–0	Cray Wanderers
37	King's Lynn	4–0	Wisbech Town
38	Lancaster City	1–1	Great Harwood
39	Leighton Town	1–1	Wealdstone
40	Littlehampton Town	2–3	Carshalton Athletic
41	Long Eaton United	2–1	Atherstone Town
42	Lowestoft Town	4–2	Gorleston
43	Maidstone United	0–2	Hastings United
44	Merthyr Tydfil	1–1	Llanelli
45	New Brighton	1–3	Ellesmere Port Town
46	Newhall United	1–3	Burton Albion
47	Newport I O W	2–2	Basingstoke Town
48	Norton Woodseats	0–0	Frickley Colliery
49	Nuneaton Borough	3–0	Lye Town
50	Ramsgate Athletic	0–0	Herne Bay
51	Redditch	2–2	Bromsgrove Rovers
52	Redhill	0–0	Hornchurch
53	Retford Town	1–2	Heanor Town
54	Rhyl	2–1	Porthmadog
55	Ringmer	4–0	Chichester City
56	Romford	0–0	Erith & Belvedere
57	Rossendale United	3–1	Horwich R M I
58	Rothwell Town	1–1	Irthlingborough Diamonds
59	Salisbury	0–1	Poole Town
60	Skelmersdale United	2–1	Marine
61	Slough Town	3–0	Kingstonian
62	Soham Town Rangers	2–0	March Town United
63	Spalding United	2–2	Boston Town
64	Spennymoor United	0–1	Gateshead
65	St Albans City	1–1	Bedford Town
66	St Blazey	3–2	Falmouth Town
67	Stanley United	1–0	Shildon
68	Taunton Town	1–2	Minehead
69	Tooting & Mitcham United	1–2	Leatherhead
70	Washington	1–0	North Shields
71	Winsford United	0–0	Oswestry Town
72	Winterton Rangers	1–2	Scarborough

=== Replays ===
Tie	Home team	Score	Away team
2	Kidderminster Harriers	7–1	Alvechurch
3	Boreham Wood	0–3	Aveley
6	Folkestone	4–2	Bexhill Town
12	Goole Town	0–0	Bridlington Trinity
13	Dinnington Athletic	0–1	Brigg Town
15	Wellingborough Town	2–2	Cambridge City (2–3 when abandoned in extra time)
34	Walton & Hersham	3–0	Hitchin Town
38	Great Harwood	3–0	Lancaster City
39	Wealdstone	0–1	Leighton Town
44	Llanelli	0–2	Merthyr Tydfil
47	Basingstoke Town	1–0	Newport I O W
48	Frickley Colliery	2–1	Norton Woodseats
50	Herne Bay	3–1	Ramsgate Athletic
51	Bromsgrove Rovers	3–0	Redditch
52	Hornchurch	2–1	Redhill
56	Erith & Belvedere	1–1	Romford
58	Irthlingborough Diamonds	5–0	Rothwell Town
63	Boston Town	3–0	Spalding United
65	Bedford Town	2–3	St Albans City
71	Oswestry Town	1–0	Winsford United

=== 3rd replays ===
Tie	Home team	Score	Away team
12	Bridlington Trinity	4–1	Goole Town
15	Wellingborough Town	1–2	Cambridge City
56	Romford	1–0	Erith & Belvedere

== 3rd qualifying round ==
=== Ties ===
Tie	Home team	Score	Away team
1	Basingstoke Town	0–0	Waterlooville
2	Blyth Spartans	2–1	Evenwood Town
3	Bognor Regis Town	1–2	Ringmer
4	Boston Town	0–4	Boston United
5	Bromsgrove Rovers	2–2	Kidderminster Harriers
6	Carshalton Athletic	0–4	Crawley Town
7	Dartford	1–1	Bishop's Stortford
8	Dunstable Town	0–4	Wycombe Wanderers
9	Ellesmere Port Town	0–1	Skelmersdale United
10	Formby	1–1	Witton Albion
11	Frickley Colliery	4–2	Brigg Town
12	Gateshead	0–0	Ferryhill Athletic
13	Great Harwood	3–2	Penrith
14	Guildford City	1–1	Cheshunt
15	Hastings United	0–0	Folkestone
16	Hayes	2–3	Aveley
17	Heanor Town	0–2	Gainsborough Trinity
18	Herne Bay	4–1	Tonbridge
19	Hornchurch	1–2	Leytonstone
20	Irthlingborough Diamonds	2–2	Cambridge City
21	King's Lynn	6–0	Soham Town Rangers
22	Leatherhead	3–0	Grays Athletic
23	Long Eaton United	1–3	Burton Albion
24	Lowestoft Town	2–1	Clacton Town
25	Merthyr Tydfil	2–0	Ton Pentre
26	Minehead	1–0	Glastonbury
27	Nuneaton Borough	2–1	Stourbridge
28	Oswestry Town	1–1	Rhyl
29	Poole Town	1–0	Bath City
30	Romford	1–1	Walton & Hersham
31	Rossendale United	1–3	South Liverpool
32	Scarborough	2–2	Bridlington Trinity
33	Slough Town	4–2	Ilford
34	St Albans City	2–1	Leighton Town
35	St Blazey	2–6	Bideford
36	Stanley United	0–2	Washington

=== Replays ===
Tie	Home team	Score	Away team
1	Waterlooville	1–0	Basingstoke Town
5	Kidderminster Harriers	2–1	Bromsgrove Rovers
7	Bishop's Stortford	3–1	Dartford
10	Witton Albion	3–1	Formby
12	Ferryhill Athletic	2–0	Gateshead
14	Cheshunt	2–0	Guildford City
15	Folkestone	4–2	Hastings United
20	Cambridge City	3–0	Irthlingborough Diamonds
28	Rhyl	2–1	Oswestry Town
30	Walton & Hersham	3–3	Romford
32	Bridlington Trinity	0–5	Scarborough

=== 3rd replay ===
Tie	Home team	Score	Away team
30	Romford	2–3	Walton & Hersham

== 4th qualifying round ==
The teams that given byes to this round are Bradford Park Avenue, Sutton United, Wimbledon, Yeovil Town, Hereford United, South Shields, Chelmsford City, Weymouth, Grantham, Altrincham, Oxford City, Barnet, Kettering Town, Margate, Bangor City, Cheltenham Town, Hillingdon Borough, Wigan Athletic, Hendon and Tamworth.

=== Ties ===
Tie	Home team	Score	Away team
1	Altrincham	1–1	Great Harwood
2	Aveley	0–0	Leytonstone
3	Bangor City	1–1	Witton Albion
4	Bishop's Stortford	5–2	Cheshunt
5	Blyth Spartans	1–1	South Shields
6	Chelmsford City	2–0	King's Lynn
7	Cheltenham Town	2–2	Burton Albion
8	Folkestone	0–0	Crawley Town
9	Frickley Colliery	1–3	Boston United
10	Grantham	1–1	Gainsborough Trinity
11	Hendon	0–0	St Albans City
12	Hereford United	5–0	Kidderminster Harriers
13	Herne Bay	0–1	Margate
14	Leatherhead	1–2	Wimbledon
15	Lowestoft Town	0–0	Barnet
16	Merthyr Tydfil	0–2	Minehead
17	Oxford City	4–1	Cambridge City
18	Poole Town	1–2	Yeovil Town
19	Rhyl	3–3	South Liverpool
20	Scarborough	3–0	Ferryhill Athletic
21	Skelmersdale United	1–1	Wigan Athletic
22	Slough Town	1–1	Hillingdon Borough
23	Tamworth	1–1	Nuneaton Borough
24	Walton & Hersham	1–0	Sutton United
25	Washington	0–3	Bradford Park Avenue
26	Waterlooville	2–3	Ringmer
27	Weymouth	3–0	Bideford
28	Wycombe Wanderers	5–0	Kettering Town

=== Replays ===
Tie	Home team	Score	Away team
1	Great Harwood	2–1	Altrincham
2	Leytonstone	2–3	Aveley
3	Witton Albion	2–3	Bangor City
5	South Shields	3–0	Blyth Spartans
7	Burton Albion	0–3	Cheltenham Town
8	Crawley Town	3–2	Folkestone
10	Gainsborough Trinity	3–3	Grantham
11	St Albans City	1–2	Hendon
15	Barnet	2–0	Lowestoft Town
19	South Liverpool	2–2	Rhyl
21	Wigan Athletic	5–0	Skelmersdale United
22	Hillingdon Borough	0–2	Slough Town
23	Nuneaton Borough	2–2	Tamworth

=== 2nd replays ===
Tie	Home team	Score	Away team
10	Grantham	2–1	Gainsborough Trinity
23	Rhyl	1–0	South Liverpool
19	Nuneaton Borough	1–3	Tamworth

== 1970–71 FA Cup ==
See 1970-71 FA Cup for details of the rounds from the first round proper onwards.
