= Harry Burgess (footballer) =

English footballer (1904–1957)

Personal information
- Date of birth: 20 August 1904
- Place of birth: Alderley Edge, England
- Date of death: 6 October 1957 (aged 53)
- Place of death: Wilmslow, England
- Height: 5 ft 7 1/2 in (1.71 m)
- Position: Inside left

Youth career
- Alderley Edge
- Sandbach Ramblers

Senior career*
Years	Team	Apps	(Gls)
1925–1929	Stockport County	112	(72)
1929–1935	Sheffield Wednesday	215	(70)
1935–1942	Chelsea	142	(34)
Total		469	(176)

International career
1930–1931	England	4	(4)
- * Club domestic league appearances and goals

Harry Burgess (20 August 1904 – 6 October 1957) was an English footballer who played at inside left for Stockport County, Sheffield Wednesday where he won the league championship in 1929–30, and Chelsea. He won four caps for England scoring four goals.

== Career ==
Burgess was born in Alderley Edge, Cheshire and played for Alderley Edge and Wilmslow Albion before appearing for Sandbach Ramblers in the Cheshire County League. In 1925 he signed for Stockport County making his debut on 13 March 1926 in a 4–0 defeat at Hull City. He made two more appearances in the 1925–26 season in which County were relegated from the Second Division. Burgess finished the season on loan at Sandbach Ramblers but returned to Stockport ready for the 1926–27 season.

The Hatters were playing in Third Division (North) for the second time but unlike 1921–22 they could not bounce back and finished sixth in a season that Burgess flourished. He hit his first professional goal in a 3–3 draw with Lincoln at Edgeley Park on 4 September 1926 and continued, finishing the season as County's leading marksman with an impressive 28 goals from 35 matches. The following season County finished third with Burgess scoring a dozen and in 1928–29 he once again top scored for the Hatters with 31 goals. Burgess' prodigious scoring talent and dribbling skills had attracted a number of First Division scouts to keep tabs on the 25-year-old and although Arsenal and Newcastle United made attempts to sign him, the lure of First Division champions The Wednesday was enough for him to move to Hillsborough on 29 June 1929 for a fee of £3,500 which was a record fee paid for a Stockport player.

Adding Burgess to the team was not the only change Sheffield made in the summer of 1929, with the 1929–30 season being the first with their new name Sheffield Wednesday. Burgess joined a team of players under their manager Bob Brown and he quickly showed his worth, scoring on his debut at Aston Villa on 14 September 1929. Wednesday went on to retain the title with Burgess scoring 19 goals, controversially losing an FA Cup Semi-final to Huddersfield to miss out on the opportunity to be the first team to win the double in the 20th Century.

At the start of the 1930–31 season the newly married Burgess' form for Wednesday attracted the attention of the England selectors and he made his debut on 20 October 1930 against Northern Ireland at Bramall Lane alongside Dixie Dean. He scored twice in a 5–1 England win, a match in which three other Wednesday players appeared: Ernie Blenkinsop, Alf Strange and Tony Leach. This is one of the two occasions to date that Wednesday have had four players in the England team. He made three further appearances for the Three Lions during the season, scoring another two goals.

That season Wednesday were again challenging for the First Division, title this time against Arsenal under their manager Herbert Chapman. Wednesday and Arsenal were first and second most of the season, swapping positions regularly, but three consecutive defeats put Wednesday out of the race and they slipped to third in the end, as the Gunners won the First Division title for the first time in the club's history, a title they would win five times in the thirties. He played in Sheffield Wednesday's 2–1 defeat by Arsenal in the Charity Shield at Stamford Bridge in October 1930.

Wednesday flew out of the blocks in the 1931–32 season but a slump at the start of 1932 left them as low as 10th position. It took seven wins from the final ten matches of the season for them to finish third for the second successive season. In 1932–33 Wednesday were back in a title race, again with Arsenal. Injuries and suspensions took their toll in the end and despite all their promise, the Owls again slipped to third.

Only five matches into the 1933–34 season, Wednesday lost their manager Bob Brown, whose wife had recently died. The club's form took a slump and they only managed to finish 11th, but Burgess was the club's leading goalscorer. Halfway through the 1934–35 season, Burgess was transferred to Chelsea. Burgess had scored 77 goals in 234 matches during his years in Sheffield.

== Career statistics ==
=== Club ===
Appearances and goals by club, season and competition
Club	Season	League		FA Cup		Total	
Club	Season	Apps	Goals	Apps	Goals	Apps	Goals
Stockport County	1925–26	3	0	0	0	3	0
Stockport County	1926–27	35	28	1	0	36	28
Stockport County	1927–28	35	12	2	0	37	12
Stockport County	1928–29	42	31	3	1	45	32
Sheffield Wednesday	1929–30	39	19	6	1	45	20
Sheffield Wednesday	1930–31	40	15	2	1	42	16
Sheffield Wednesday	1931–32	37	7	5	4	41	11
Sheffield Wednesday	1932–33	38	8	1	0	39	8
Sheffield Wednesday	1933–34	38	12	5	1	43	13
Sheffield Wednesday	1934–35	23	9	0	0	23	9
Chelsea	1934–35	10	3	0	0	10	3
Chelsea	1935–36	31	11	5	1	36	12
Chelsea	1936–37	29	5	1	0	30	5
Chelsea	1937–38	36	7	1	0	37	7
Chelsea	1938–39	36	8	6	3	42	11
Career total		472	175	38	12	510	187

=== International ===
Scores and results list England's goal tally first, score column indicates score after each Burgess goal.

List of international goals scored by Harry Burgess
No.	Date	Venue	Opponent	Score	Result	Competition
1	20 October 1930	Bramall Lane, Sheffield, England	Northern Ireland		5–1	British Home Championship
2	20 October 1930	Bramall Lane, Sheffield, England	Northern Ireland		5–1	British Home Championship
3	16 May 1931	Oscar Bossaert Stadion, Brussels, Belgium	Belgium		4–1	Friendly
4	16 May 1931	Oscar Bossaert Stadion, Brussels, Belgium	Belgium		4–1	Friendly
