= Banstead Hospital F.C. =

Banstead Hospital
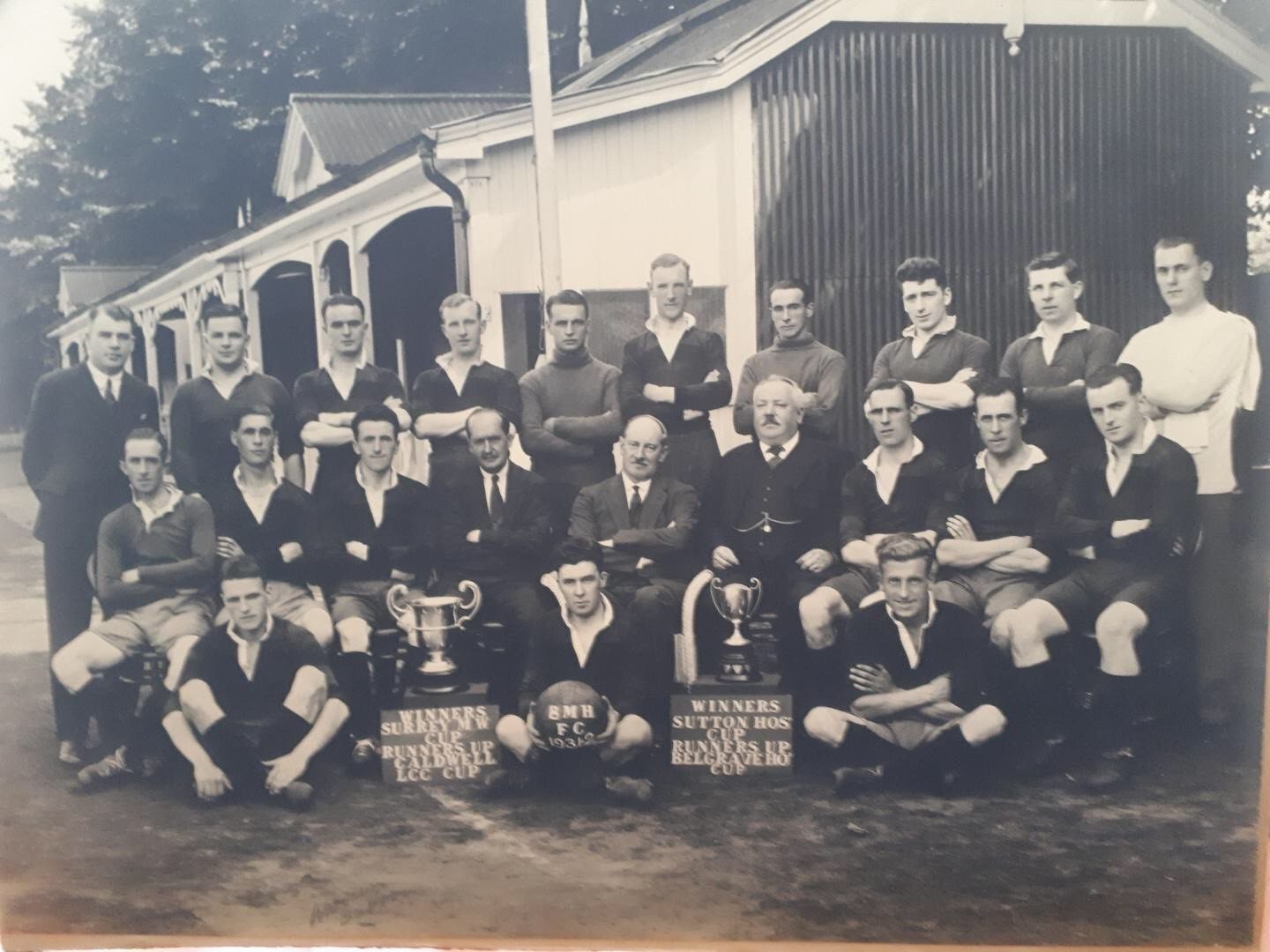
- Full name: Banstead Hospital Football Club
- Ground: Banstead Hospital, Belmont

Banstead Hospital Football Club was a football club based in Belmont, England.

== History ==
In 1877, the Third Middlesex County Asylum was opened in Belmont, with space for 1,700 patients. During the 20th century, Banstead Mental Hospital was formed for the workers at the renamed facility. After plying their trade in the Sutton and District League, the club entered the Surrey Senior League in the 1933–34 season, winning the league at the first attempt. In the 1933–34 season, Banstead Mental Hospital entered the FA Cup for the first time, defeating Leyland Motors in the extra preliminary round to reach the preliminary round. The club also reached the preliminary round three seasons later. In the 1933–34 season, Banstead Mental Hospital reached the third qualifying round of the FA Amateur Cup, defeating the likes of West Norwood and Carshalton Athletic, before losing 3–0 to Redhill.

Following World War II, the club, now renamed to Banstead Hospital, once again entered the FA Cup and the FA Amateur Cup, losing 2–0 against Metropolitan Police in the preliminary round and 6–2 against Redhill in the second qualifying round respectively. In 1946, Banstead Hospital dropped out of senior football due to ground grading issues, continuing at a more amateur level of football.

== Ground ==
The club played at the hospital grounds at Banstead Hospital, with the facilities deemed good enough to host training for Crystal Palace.

== Records ==
- Best FA Amateur Cup performance: Third qualifying round, 1938–39
- Best FA Cup performance: Preliminary round, 1934–35, 1937–38, 1945–46
