= 1934–35 FA Cup =

Tournament details
- Country: England; Wales

Final positions
- Champions: Sheffield Wednesday (3rd title)
- Runners-up: West Bromwich Albion

The 1934–35 FA Cup was the 60th season of the world's oldest football cup competition, the Football Association Challenge Cup, commonly known as the FA Cup. Sheffield Wednesday won the competition for the third time, beating West Bromwich Albion 4–2 in the final at Wembley, winning through two late goals from Ellis Rimmer.

== Calendar ==
Round	Date
Extra preliminary round	Saturday 1 September 1934
Preliminary round	Saturday 15 September 1934
First round qualifying	Saturday 29 September 1934
Second round qualifying	Saturday 13 October 1934
Third round qualifying	Saturday 27 October 1934
Fourth round qualifying	Saturday 10 November 1934
First round proper	Saturday 24 November 1934
Second round proper	Saturday 8 December 1934
Third round proper	Saturday 12 January 1935
Fourth round proper	Saturday 26 January 1935
Fifth round proper	Saturday 16 February 1935
Sixth round proper	Saturday 2 March 1935
Semi-finals	Saturday 16 March 1935
Final	Saturday 27 April 1935

== Qualifying rounds ==
Most participating clubs that were not members of the Football League competed in the qualifying rounds to secure one of 25 places available in the first round.

The 25 winners from the fourth qualifying round were Spennymoor United, Blyth Spartans, Shildon, Workington, Darwen, Stalybridge Celtic, Wigan Athletic, Dinnington Athletic, Scunthorpe & Lindsey United, Burton Town, Birmingham Corporation Tramways, Boston United, Walthamstow Avenue, Bedford Town, Harwich & Parkeston, Wimbledon, Golders Green (formerly known as Hampstead Town and later to be known as Hendon), Dartford, Folkestone, Ashford, Guildford City, Leyton, Bath City, Barry and Yeovil & Petter's United.

Those appearing in the competition proper for the first time were Dinnington Athletic, Birmingham Corporation Tramways, Bedford Town, Harwich & Parkeston, Golders Green and Ashford. Wigan Athletic and Boston United also qualified for the main draw for the first time in their own right, however predecessor clubs from both those towns had featured at this stage in recent seasons.

Birmingham Corporation Tramways, Ashford and Guildford City had progressed to this stage from the extra preliminary round. Birmingham Tramways defeated Boldmere St Michaels, Bromsgrove Rovers, Leamington Town, Stourbridge, Shrewsbury Town and Louth Town; Ashford beat Royal Marines Deal, Ramsgate, Aylesford Paper Mills, Sittingbourne, London Paper Mills and Northfleet United; while Guildford City overcame Woking, Banstead Mental Hospital, Wills Sports, Epsom, Post Office Engineers and Worthing. All three clubs lost in the first round.

== First round proper ==
At this stage 41 clubs from the Football League Third Division North and South joined the 25 non-league clubs that came through the qualifying rounds. Chesterfield, Millwall and Luton Town were given byes to the third round. To make the number of matches up, non-league sides Corinthian and Dulwich Hamlet were given byes to this round, with Dulwich Hamlet having won the previous season's FA Amateur Cup.

34 matches were scheduled to be played on Saturday, 24 November 1934. Six were drawn and went to replays in the following midweek fixture, of which the Southport–New Brighton game went to a second replay.

Wigan Athletic's comprehensive upset of Carlisle United at Brunton Park established a record for the largest margin of victory by a non-league club over a League club at the League club's home ground. This record is still standing in the 21st century (although it was equalled by Boston United against Derby County in 1955-56).

Tie no	Home team	Score	Away team	Date
1	Chester	3–1	Dinnington Athletic	24 November 1934
2	Darwen	1–2	Boston United	24 November 1934
3	Bristol City	2–0	Gillingham	24 November 1934
4	Watford	2–0	Corinthian	24 November 1934
5	Crewe Alexandra	1–2	Walsall	24 November 1934
6	Swindon Town	4–0	Newport County	24 November 1934
7	Doncaster Rovers	0–2	Barrow	24 November 1934
8	Wrexham	4–1	Rochdale	24 November 1934
9	Tranmere Rovers	3–1	Stalybridge Celtic	24 November 1934
10	Queens Park Rangers	2–0	Walthamstow Avenue	24 November 1934
11	Bristol Rovers	3–0	Harwich & Parkeston	24 November 1934
12	Coventry City	7–0	Scunthorpe & Lindsey United	24 November 1934
13	Brighton & Hove Albion	3–1	Folkestone	24 November 1934
14	Shildon	2–2	Lincoln City	24 November 1934
Replay	Lincoln City	4–0	Shildon	28 November 1934
15	Carlisle United	1–6	Wigan Athletic	24 November 1934
16	Wimbledon	1–1	Leyton	24 November 1934
Replay	Leyton	0–1	Wimbledon	29 November 1934
17	Southend United	10–1	Golders Green	24 November 1934
18	Blyth Spartans	1–1	Stockport County	24 November 1934
Replay	Stockport County	4–1	Blyth Spartans	28 November 1934
19	Bedford Town	2–3	Dartford	24 November 1934
20	Mansfield Town	6–1	Accrington Stanley	24 November 1934
21	Cardiff City	1–2	Reading	24 November 1934
22	Burton Town	2–3	York City	24 November 1934
23	Barry	0–1	Northampton Town	24 November 1934
24	Halifax Town	1–1	Hartlepools United	24 November 1934
Replay	Hartlepools United	2–0	Halifax Town	28 November 1934
25	Charlton Athletic	2–2	Exeter City	24 November 1934
Replay	Exeter City	5–2	Charlton Athletic	28 November 1934
26	Southport	1–1	New Brighton	24 November 1934
Replay	New Brighton	1–1	Southport	28 November 1934
Replay	Southport	1–2	New Brighton	3 December 1934
27	Yeovil & Petter's United	3–0	Crystal Palace	24 November 1934
28	Dulwich Hamlet	1–2	Torquay United	24 November 1934
29	Workington	2–0	Birmingham Corporation Tramways	24 November 1934
30	Rotherham United	2–0	Spennymoor United	24 November 1934
31	Aldershot	4–0	Bournemouth & Boscombe Athletic	24 November 1934
32	Guildford City	1–2	Bath City	24 November 1934
33	Ashford	1–4	Clapton Orient	24 November 1934
34	Gateshead	1–4	Darlington	24 November 1934

== Second round proper ==
The matches were played on Saturday, 8 December 1934. Two matches were drawn, with replays taking place in the following midweek fixture.

Tie no	Home team	Score	Away team	Date
1	Dartford	0–1	Bristol Rovers	8 December 1934
2	Barrow	0–2	Aldershot	8 December 1934
3	Bath City	2–1	Boston United	8 December 1934
4	Watford	1–1	Walsall	8 December 1934
Replay	Walsall	1–0	Watford	13 December 1934
5	Reading	3–0	Wrexham	8 December 1934
6	Swindon Town	4–3	Lincoln City	8 December 1934
7	Stockport County	3–2	Darlington	8 December 1934
8	Queens Park Rangers	1–2	Brighton & Hove Albion	8 December 1934
9	Northampton Town	0–0	Workington	8 December 1934
Replay	Workington	0–1	Northampton Town	13 December 1934
10	Clapton Orient	1–3	Chester	8 December 1934
11	Wimbledon	1–5	Southend United	8 December 1934
12	Hartlepools United	0–4	Coventry City	8 December 1934
13	Mansfield Town	4–2	Tranmere Rovers	8 December 1934
14	Yeovil & Petter's United	4–1	Exeter City	8 December 1934
15	York City	1–0	New Brighton	8 December 1934
16	Rotherham United	1–2	Bristol City	8 December 1934
17	Wigan Athletic	3–2	Torquay United	8 December 1934

== Third round proper ==
The 44 First and Second Division clubs entered the competition at this stage, along with Chesterfield, Millwall and Luton Town.

The matches were scheduled for Saturday, 12 January 1935. Seven matches were drawn and went to replays in the following midweek fixture, of which the Bristol City–Bury game went to a second replay. Wigan Athletic, Bath City and Yeovil & Petter's United were the last clubs from the qualifying rounds remaining in the competition.

Tie no	Home team	Score	Away team	Date
1	Birmingham	5–1	Coventry City	12 January 1935
2	Chester	0–4	Nottingham Forest	12 January 1935
3	Bristol City	1–1	Bury	12 January 1935
Replay	Bury	2–2	Bristol City	16 January 1935
Replay	Bristol City	2–1	Bury	21 January 1935
4	Burnley	4–2	Mansfield Town	12 January 1935
5	Preston North End	0–0	Barnsley	12 January 1935
Replay	Barnsley	0–1	Preston North End	16 January 1935
6	Walsall	1–2	Southampton	12 January 1935
7	Leicester City	2–1	Blackpool	12 January 1935
8	Aston Villa	1–3	Bradford City	12 January 1935
9	Sheffield Wednesday	3–1	Oldham Athletic	12 January 1935
10	Wolverhampton Wanderers	4–0	Notts County	12 January 1935
11	Middlesbrough	1–1	Blackburn Rovers	12 January 1935
Replay	Blackburn Rovers	1–0	Middlesbrough	17 January 1935
12	West Bromwich Albion	2–1	Port Vale	12 January 1935
13	Sunderland	3–2	Fulham	12 January 1935
14	Everton	6–3	Grimsby Town	12 January 1935
15	Swindon Town	2–1	Chesterfield	12 January 1935
16	Tottenham Hotspur	1–0	Manchester City	12 January 1935
17	Brentford	0–1	Plymouth Argyle	12 January 1935
18	Bristol Rovers	1–3	Manchester United	12 January 1935
19	Northampton Town	0–2	Bolton Wanderers	12 January 1935
20	Portsmouth	1–1	Huddersfield Town	12 January 1935
Replay	Huddersfield Town	2–3	Portsmouth	16 January 1935
21	West Ham United	1–1	Stockport County	12 January 1935
Replay	Stockport County	1–0	West Ham United	16 January 1935
22	Brighton & Hove Albion	0–2	Arsenal	12 January 1935
23	Norwich City	2–0	Bath City	12 January 1935
24	Hull City	1–5	Newcastle United	12 January 1935
25	Chelsea	1–1	Luton Town	12 January 1935
Replay	Luton Town	2–0	Chelsea	16 January 1935
26	Southend United	0–4	Sheffield United	12 January 1935
27	Swansea Town	4–1	Stoke City	12 January 1935
28	Yeovil & Petter's United	2–6	Liverpool	12 January 1935
29	Leeds United	4–1	Bradford Park Avenue	12 January 1935
30	York City	0–1	Derby County	12 January 1935
31	Aldershot	0–0	Reading	12 January 1935
Replay	Reading	3–1	Aldershot	16 January 1935
32	Wigan Athletic	1–4	Millwall	12 January 1935

== Fourth round proper ==
The matches were scheduled for Saturday, 26 January 1935. Five games were drawn and went to replays in the following midweek fixture.

Tie no	Home team	Score	Away team	Date
1	Burnley	3–1	Luton Town	26 January 1935
2	Southampton	0–3	Birmingham	26 January 1935
3	Reading	1–0	Millwall	26 January 1935
4	Leicester City	0–1	Arsenal	26 January 1935
5	Nottingham Forest	0–0	Manchester United	26 January 1935
Replay	Manchester United	0–3	Nottingham Forest	30 January 1935
6	Blackburn Rovers	1–0	Liverpool	26 January 1935
7	Wolverhampton Wanderers	1–2	Sheffield Wednesday	26 January 1935
8	West Bromwich Albion	7–1	Sheffield United	26 January 1935
9	Sunderland	1–1	Everton	26 January 1935
Replay	Everton	6–4	Sunderland	30 January 1935
10	Derby County	3–0	Swansea Town	26 January 1935
11	Swindon Town	0–2	Preston North End	26 January 1935
12	Tottenham Hotspur	2–0	Newcastle United	26 January 1935
13	Portsmouth	0–0	Bristol City	26 January 1935
Replay	Bristol City	2–0	Portsmouth	30 January 1935
14	Norwich City	3–3	Leeds United	26 January 1935
Replay	Leeds United	1–2	Norwich City	30 January 1935
15	Plymouth Argyle	1–4	Bolton Wanderers	26 January 1935
16	Bradford City	0–0	Stockport County	26 January 1935
Replay	Stockport County	3–2	Bradford City	31 January 1935

== Fifth round proper ==
The matches were scheduled for Saturday, 16 February 1935, except for the Blackburn Rovers–Birmingham City game, which was played five days later. There were three replays, played in the next midweek fixture. Of these, the Tottenham Hotspur–Bolton Wanderers game went to a second replay.

Tie no	Home team	Score	Away team	Date
1	Bristol City	0–0	Preston North End	16 February 1935
Replay	Preston North End	5–0	Bristol City	25 February 1935
2	Reading	0–1	Arsenal	16 February 1935
3	Nottingham Forest	0–0	Burnley	16 February 1935
Replay	Burnley	3–0	Nottingham Forest	19 February 1935
4	Blackburn Rovers	1–2	Birmingham	21 February 1935
5	Everton	3–1	Derby County	16 February 1935
6	Stockport County	0–5	West Bromwich Albion	16 February 1935
7	Tottenham Hotspur	1–1	Bolton Wanderers	16 February 1935
Replay	Bolton Wanderers	1–1	Tottenham Hotspur	20 February 1935
Replay	Bolton Wanderers	2–0	Tottenham Hotspur	25 February 1935
8	Norwich City	0–1	Sheffield Wednesday	16 February 1935

== Sixth round proper ==
The four quarter-final ties were scheduled to be played on Saturday, 2 March 1935. There were no replays.

Tie no	Home team	Score	Away team	Date
1	Burnley	3–2	Birmingham	2 March 1935
2	Sheffield Wednesday	2–1	Arsenal	2 March 1935
3	West Bromwich Albion	1–0	Preston North End	2 March 1935
4	Everton	1–2	Bolton Wanderers	2 March 1935

== Semi-finals ==
The semi-final matches were played on Saturday, 16 March 1935. Sheffield Wednesday and West Bromwich Albion won their matches to meet in the final at Wembley

16 March 1935
15:00

Sheffield Wednesday	3–0	Burnley

Villa Park, Birmingham

16 March 1935
15:00

West Bromwich Albion	1–1	Bolton Wanderers

Elland Road, Leeds
Attendance: 52,605

Replay

20 March 1935
19:45

West Bromwich Albion	2–0	Bolton Wanderers

Victoria Ground, Stoke
Attendance: 49,110

== Final ==
The 1935 FA Cup Final was contested by Sheffield Wednesday and West Bromwich Albion at Wembley. Sheffield Wednesday won the game through two late goals from Ellis Rimmer, which were needed despite having twice been ahead - West Bromwich Albion managed to equalise each time.

=== Match details ===
27 April 1935
15:00 BST

Sheffield Wednesday	4–2	West Bromwich Albion
Palethorpe 2'; Hooper 70'; Rimmer 85' 89'		Boyes 21'; Sandford 75'

Wembley, London
Attendance: 93,204
Referee: Bert Fogg

Sheffield Wednesday	West Bromwich Albion

== See also ==
- FA Cup Final Results 1872-
