= Gavin Malloch =

Scottish footballer

Personal information
- Full name: Gavin Malloch
- Date of birth: 18 July 1905
- Place of birth: Govan, Scotland
- Date of death: 10 December 1974 (aged 69)
- Place of death: Glasgow, Scotland
- Height: 5 ft 10 1/2 in (1.79 m)
- Position: Left half

Senior career*
Years	Team	Apps	(Gls)
–	Benburb		
1927–1931	Derby County	93	(0)
1931–1936	Sheffield Wednesday	84	(0)
1936–1937	Millwall		
1937–1938	Barrow		
1938–1939	Morton	20	(1)
- * Club domestic league appearances and goals

Gavin Malloch (18 July 1905 – 10 December 1974) was a Scottish footballer who played as a left half for Derby County, Sheffield Wednesday, Millwall, Barrow and Morton. He was a member of the Derby team that were runners-up in the 1929–30 Football League campaign, and after switching to that season's champions Wednesday, he was part of the Owls squad when they finished third in 1930–31 and 1931–32, but was no longer a regular by the time they won the FA Cup in 1935, making no contribution to the run.

He was not related to Jock Malloch, another Scot who was with Sheffield Wednesday a generation earlier.
