= Rise Carr =

Coordinates: 54.544°N 1.558°W

- Location within County Durham
- OS grid reference: NZ286165
- Unitary authority: County Durham
- Ceremonial county: County Durham
- Region: North East
- Country: England
- Sovereign state: United Kingdom
- Post town: Darlington
- Postcode district: DL3
- Police: Durham
- Fire: County Durham and Darlington
- Ambulance: North East

Rise Carr is a place in County Durham, in England. It is situated to the north of the centre of Darlington.

== Notable people ==
Rise Carr was the birthplace of Manchester United legend Charlie Roberts, who was Manchester United's first England international.
