= Robert Brown (football manager) =

English footballer and manager

Personal information
- Date of birth: 1873
- Date of death: March 1935
- Place of death: Leeds

Managerial career
- Years: Team
- 1920: Gillingham
- 1920–1933: Sheffield Wednesday

Robert Brown (died 1935) was an English association football player and manager in the early twentieth century.

== Career ==
After an undistinguished career in semi-professional football in his native north-east England, Brown joined Sheffield Wednesday as a scout. In 1911 he joined Portsmouth as secretary, a job he held for nine years. In May 1920 he was appointed manager of Gillingham in preparation for the club's first season in the Football League, but he resigned just four weeks later, before the team had even played its first League match, in order to return to Sheffield Wednesday as manager.

He guided Wednesday to promotion to the Football League First Division in 1925 and then on to consecutive league titles in 1929 and 1930. After thirteen years in charge at Hillsborough he retired from football management in 1933, soon after the death of his wife.

== Death ==
In 1935 he collapsed at Leeds railway station and died 24 hours later. He was buried at Wadsley, Sheffield.

== See also ==
- List of English football championship winning managers
