= 1931 FA Charity Shield =

- Event: FA Charity Shield
Arsenal	West Bromwich Albion
1	0
- Date: 7 October 1931
- Venue: Villa Park, Birmingham
- Attendance: 21,276

The 1931 FA Charity Shield was the 18th FA Charity Shield, a football match between the winners of the previous season's First Division and FA Cup competitions. The match was contested by league champions Arsenal and FA Cup winners West Bromwich Albion, and was played at Villa Park, the home ground of Aston Villa. Arsenal won the game, 1–0.

== Match ==
=== Details ===
7 October 1931

Arsenal	1–0	West Bromwich Albion
Bastin

Villa Park, Birmingham
Attendance: 21,276

Arsenal
West Bromwich Albion

GK	(England) Charlie Preedy
FB	(England) Eddie Hapgood
FB	(England) Tom Parker (c)
HB	(England) Alf Haynes
HB	(Wales) Charlie Jones
HB	(England) Herbie Roberts
FW	(England) Cliff Bastin
FW	(England) Joe Hulme
FW	(England) David Jack
FW	(Scotland) Alex James
FW	(England) Jack Lambert
Manager:
(England) Herbert Chapman

GK	(England) Harold Pearson
FB	(England) George Shaw
FB	(England) Bert Trentham
HB	(England) Jimmy Edwards
HB	(England) Tommy Magee
HB	(England) Bill Richardson
FW	(England) Tommy Glidden (c)
FW	(England) Harry Raw
FW	(England) W. G. Richardson
FW	(England) Teddy Sandford
FW	(England) Stan Wood
Manager:
(England) Fred Everiss
