= Purcell (surname) =

Purcell is a surname of Norman origin, and common in Ireland and England. It was given to those whose occupation was swineherd. In Ireland Purcells can be most commonly found in County Tipperary and County Kilkenny.

== Notables with this name ==
- A. A. Purcell (1872–1935), president of the British Trades Union Congress and Labour Member of Parliament
- Alban W. Purcell (c. 1843–1913), American stage actor, dramatist and manager
- Albert Purcell (1913–2001), English former footballer
- Andrew Purcell, former professional rugby league footballer
- Benjamin Purcell (1928-2013), American army officer and state legislator
- Bennie Purcell (1929–2016), former professional basketball player and collegiate tennis coach
- Bernie Purcell, Australian rugby league footballer
- Bill Purcell (disambiguation)
- Blondie Purcell (1854–1912), American Major League Baseball player
- Brian Purcell (1938–1969), Welsh professional footballer
- Charmian Purcell (born 1979), New Zealand basketball player
- Clare Purcell (1884–1964), American bishop
- Daniel Purcell (1664–1717), English composer, younger brother to Henry
- Darryn Purcell (born 1985), Australian lightweight rower
- Debi Purcell, American mixed martial artist
- Deirdre Purcell (1945–2023), Irish author
- Dick Purcell (1905-1944), American actor
- Dominic Purcell (born 1970), Irish-Australian actor
- Edward Purcell (musician) (1689–1740), English composer
- Edward A. Purcell, Jr., American historian
- Edward Henry Purcell (died 1765), English organist, printer, and music publisher
- Edward Mills Purcell (1912–1997), U.S. physicist, Nobel Prize winner
- Father Austin Purcell, fictional character in the television comedy Father Ted
- Francis T. Purcell (1918–2014), former Republican politician
- François Purcell, elected official from Montréal
- Ganson Purcell, former chairman of the U.S. Securities and Exchange Commission
- George Purcell, former English professional association football player
- Gillis Philip Purcell (1904–1987), Canadian journalist
- Gordon Purcell (born 1959), American comic book artist
- Graham B. Purcell, Jr. (1919–2011), U.S. Representative from Texas
- Henry Purcell (1659–1695), English composer
- Henry Purcell (judge), New York Supreme Court
- Hugh Purcell of Loughmoe (12th Century), Irish Lord and politician
- Howard Purcell (1918–1981), American comic-book artist and writer
- Ian Purcell (1947–2016), Australian gay activist
- Irene Purcell (1901–1972), American movie actress
- Jack Purcell (1903–1991), Canadian world champion badminton player
- James Purcell of Loughmoe (1609-1652), Irish Nobleman
- James Purcell (mountain man), 19th-century American mountain man and explorer
- James Purcell (politician) (1953-), Australian Politician
- Jane Purcell Coffee (1944–2023), American mathematician
- Jessica Purcell, American and Australian mathematician
- Jim Purcell, former Chief of Police in Portland, Oregon
- Joe Purcell (1923–1987), former Governor of Arkansas
- John Purcell (disambiguation), several people
- José L. Purcell, Puerto Rican Judge, founder-president Puerto Rican Volleyball Federation
- Josh Kilmer-Purcell (born 1969), American writer
- Kalani Purcell (born 1995), New Zealand basketball player
- Kay Purcell (1963–2020), English actress
- Kieran Purcell (born 1945), former Irish sportsman
- Leah Purcell (born 1970), Australian actress
- Lee Purcell (born 1947), American actress
- Max Purcell (born 1998), Australian tennis player
- Mel Purcell (born 1959), former professional tennis player and current collegiate tennis coach
- Mike Purcell (born 1991), American football player
- Nicholas Purcell of Loughmoe (1651–1722), Irish nobleman
- Nicholas Purcell (MP) (died 1559)
- Nicholas Purcell (Classicist) (?), professor of Ancient history
- Noel Purcell (disambiguation)
- Pat Purcell (born 1947), Australian politician
- Patrick Purcell (1833–1891), Canadian railway contractor and political figure
- Phil Purcell (hurler) (1900–1963), Irish sportsman
- Philip J. Purcell (born 1943), Morgan Stanley CEO 1997–2005
- Richard Purcell of Loughmoe (16th - 17th Century) Baron and Jury
- Robert Purcell (1912–1991), American businessman and philanthropist
- Ron Purcell, American guitarist
- Sally Purcell (1944–1998), British poet and translator
- Sarah Purcell (born 1948), American television shows host
- Sarahbeth Purcell (born 1977), American author of fiction
- Seán Purcell (1929–2005), Gaelic footballer
- Steve Purcell, comic book artist
- Steven Purcell (born 1972), Scottish politician
- Thomas Purcell of Loughmoe (1538-1607), Irish nobleman
- Tadhg Purcell (born 1985), Irish footballer
- Teddy Purcell (born 1985), Canadian professional ice hockey right winger
- Thomas Purcell of Loughmoe (1538–1609), Irish nobleman
- Toby Purcell, Anglo-Irish soldier of the 17th century
- Tommy Purcell (1921–1949), Irish sportsman
- Victor Purcell (1896–1965), British colonial public servant, historian, poet and sinologist
- William Purcell (disambiguation)
