= List of West Bromwich Albion F.C. records and statistics =

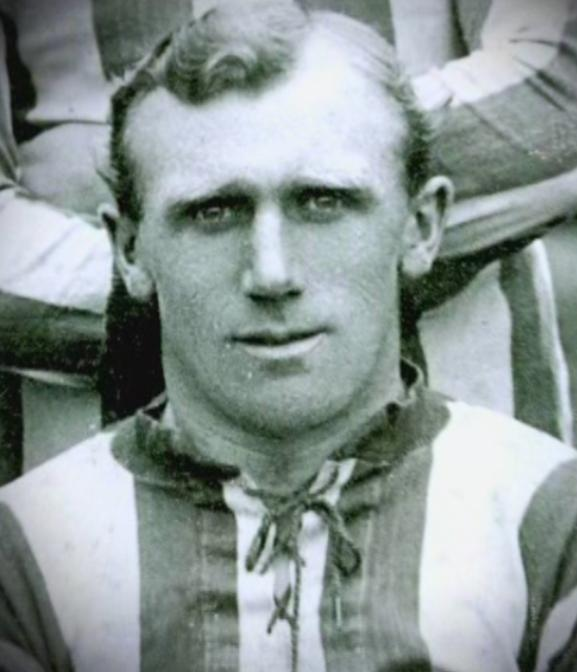
Jesse Pennington, Albion's most capped England international.

West Bromwich Albion Football Club are an English professional association football club based in West Bromwich, West Midlands. The club was founded in 1878 as West Bromwich Strollers, by workers from George Salter's Spring Works and turned professional in 1885. A founder member of the Football League in 1888, the team has spent the majority of its history in the top division of English football.

This list encompasses records set by the club, their managers and their players. The player records section includes details of the club's leading goalscorers and those who have made most appearances in first-team competitions. It also records notable achievements by Albion players on the international stage, and the highest transfer fees paid and received by the club. Attendance records at The Hawthorns, the club's home ground since 1900, are also included. Records generally refer only to first team, competitive matches in national or European competitions. Reserve matches, youth matches, friendlies, testimonials, war-time matches and regional competitions are not considered, except where indicated.

The club's record appearance maker and goalscorer is Tony Brown, who scored 279 goals in 720 appearances between 1963 and 1981.

== Player records ==
=== Appearances ===
- Youngest first-team league player: Charlie Wilson, 16 years 73 days, vs Oldham Athletic, First Division, 1 October 1921
- Youngest Premier League player: Isaiah Brown, 16 years 117 days vs Wigan Athletic, 4 May 2013^{[A]}
- Oldest first-team player: George Baddeley, 39 years 345 days, vs Sheffield Wednesday, First Division, 18 April 1914
- Oldest Premier League player: Dean Kiely, 38 years 226 days vs Blackburn Rovers, 24 May 2009
- Most Premier League appearances: 269, Chris Brunt
- Most substitute appearances: 93, Hal Robson-Kanu, 2016–21

==== Most appearances ====
Total appearances including substitute appearances are listed below, with the number of substitute appearances shown in parentheses.

| Rank | Player | Years | League | FA Cup | League Cup | Other^{[B]} | Total |
|---|---|---|---|---|---|---|---|
| 1 | (England) Tony Brown | 1963–1981 | 574 (13) | 54 (1) | 47 (1) | 45 (1) | 720 (16) |
| 2 | (Scotland) Ally Robertson | 1968–1986 | 504 (2) | 34 (2) | 53 (0) | 31 (0) | 622 (4) |
| 3 | (England) John Wile | 1970–1983 | 499 (1) | 42 (0) | 42 (0) | 35 (0) | 618 (1) |
| 4 | (England) Jesse Pennington | 1903–1922 | 455 (0) | 39 (0) | 0 (0) | 2 (0) | 496 (0) |
| 5 | (England) Tommy Glidden | 1922–1936 | 445 (0) | 33 (0) | 0 (0) | 1 (0) | 479 (0) |
| 6 | (England) Len Millard | 1937–1958 | 436 (0) | 40 (0) | 0 (0) | 1 (0) | 477 (0) |
| 7 | (England) Joe Smith | 1910–1926 | 434 (0) | 30 (0) | 0 (0) | 7 (0) | 471 (0) |
| 8 | (England) Ronnie Allen | 1950–1961 | 415 (0) | 42 (0) | 0 (0) | 1 (0) | 458 (0) |
| 9 | (England) Joe Carter | 1921–1936 | 414 (0) | 37 (0) | 0 (0) | 0 (0) | 451 (0) |
| 10 | (England) Ray Barlow | 1944–1960 | 403 (0) | 46 (0) | 0 (0) | 0 (0) | 449 (0) |

=== Goalscorers ===
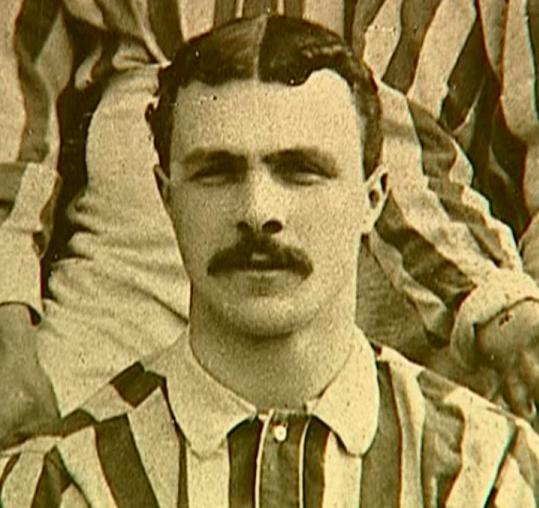
Joe Wilson scored the club's first league goal.

- Most goals in a season: 40, W. G. Richardson, 1935–36
- Most league goals in a season: 39, W. G. Richardson, 1935–36
- Most league goals in one match: 6, Jimmy Cookson, vs Blackpool, Second Division, 17 September 1927
- First league goal: Joe Wilson, vs Stoke, The Football League, 8 September 1888
- First FA Cup hat-trick: Jem Bayliss, vs Old Westminsters, sixth round, 13 February 1886
- First league hat-trick: Tom Pearson, vs Bolton Wanderers, The Football League, 4 November 1889
- Most hat-tricks: 14, W. G. Richardson, 1931–1938
- Most Premier League goals: 30, Peter Odemwingie
- Oldest Premier League goalscorer: Gareth McAuley, 37 years 87 days, 25 February 2017 vs Bournemouth

==== Top goalscorers ====
Tony Brown is the all-time top goalscorer for West Bromwich Albion.

Appearances, including substitute appearances, are marked in parentheses.

| Rank | Player | Years | League | FA Cup | League Cup | Other^{[B]} | Total |
|---|---|---|---|---|---|---|---|
| 1 | (England) Tony Brown | 1963–1981 | 218 (574) | 27 (54) | 17 (47) | 17 (45) | 279 (720) |
| 2 | (England) Ronnie Allen | 1950–1961 | 208 (415) | 23 (42) | 0 (0) | 3 (1) | 234 (458) |
| 3 | (England) W. G. Richardson | 1929–1949 | 202 (320) | 26 (34) | 0 (0) | 1 (0) | 228 (355) |
| 4 | (England) Jeff Astle | 1964–1974 | 137 (292) | 14 (23) | 19 (28) | 4 (18) | 174 (361) |
| 5 | (England) Derek Kevan | 1953–1963 | 157 (262) | 16 (29) | 0 (0) | 0 (0) | 173 (291) |
| 6 | (England) Joe Carter | 1921–1936 | 145 (414) | 10 (37) | 0 (0) | 0 (0) | 155 (451) |
| 7 | (England) Tommy Glidden | 1922–1936 | 135 (445) | 5 (33) | 0 (0) | 0 (1) | 140 (479) |
| 8 | (England) Bob Taylor | 1992–1998; 2000–2003 | 113 (324) | 4 (10) | 6 (22) | 8 (21) | 131 (377) |
| 9 | (England) Fred Morris | 1911–1924 | 112 (263) | 4 (20) | 0 (0) | 2 (4) | 118 (287) |
| 10 | (England) Cyrille Regis | 1977–1984 | 82 (237) | 10 (25) | 16 (28) | 4 (12) | 112 (302) |

=== International caps ===
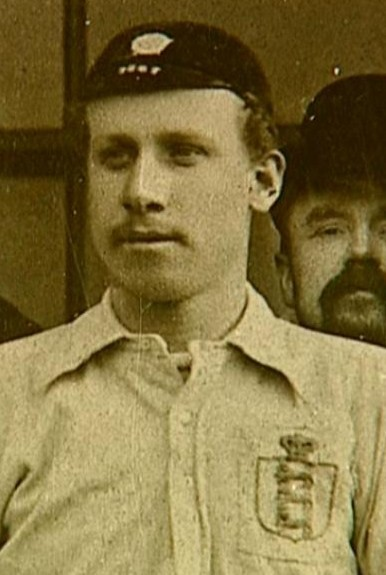
Bob Roberts was Albion's first international player.

This section refers only to caps won while a West Bromwich Albion player.

- First representative honour: Bob Roberts for North vs South, played in London on 26 January 1884
- First international cap: Bob Roberts for England vs Scotland, 19 March 1887
- Most capped player: Chris Brunt, 47 caps for Northern Ireland as a West Bromwich Albion player (65 caps in total)
- Most capped player for England: Jesse Pennington, 25 caps as an Albion player
- First players to play in the World Cup Finals: Stuart Williams for Wales vs Hungary in Sandviken and Don Howe, Bobby Robson and Derek Kevan for England vs USSR in Gothenburg, both matches on 8 June 1958 at the 1958 World Cup finals.
- First player to score in a World Cup Finals: Derek Kevan for England vs USSR in Gothenburg on 8 June 1958 at the 1958 World Cup finals.

== Transfers ==
=== Highest transfer fees paid ===
| Rank | Player | Fee | Paid to | Date | Notes |
|---|---|---|---|---|---|
| 1 | (Scotland) Oliver Burke | £15 million | (Germany) RB Leipzig | 25 August 2017 | |
| 2 | (Belgium) Nacer Chadli | £13 million | (England) Tottenham Hotspur | 29 August 2016 | |
| 3 | (Venezuela) Salomón Rondón | £12 million | (Russia) Zenit Saint Petersburg | 10 August 2015 | |
| 4 | (England) Jay Rodriguez | £12 million | (England) Southampton | 2 July 2017 | |
| 5 | (Nigeria) Brown Ideye | £10 million | (Ukraine) Dynamo Kyiv | 18 July 2014 | |
| 6 | (England) Jake Livermore | £10 million | (England) Hull City | 20 January 2017 | |
| 7 | (Benin) Stéphane Sessègnon | £6.6 million | (England) Sunderland | 2 September 2013 | |
| 8 | (Nigeria) Victor Anichebe | £6 million | (England) Everton | 2 September 2013 | |
| 9 | (Republic of Ireland) Shane Long | £5 million | (England) Reading | 9 August 2011 | ^{[C]} |
| 10 | (Spain) Borja Valero | £4.7 million | (Spain) Mallorca | 22 August 2008 | |

=== Progression of record transfer fee paid ===
Transfers in bold are also British record transfers

| Rank | Player | Fee | Paid to | Date | Notes |
|---|---|---|---|---|---|
| 1 | (England) Bobby Blood | £4,000 | Port Vale | February 1921 | |
| 2 | (England) George Shaw | £4,100 | Huddersfield Town | December 1926 | |
| 3 | (England) Cecil Shaw | £7,500 | Wolverhampton Wanderers | December 1936 | |
| 4 | (Ireland) (Republic of Ireland) Jack Vernon | £9,500 | (Republic of Ireland) Belfast Celtic | February 1947 | |
| 5 | (England) Ronnie Allen | £20,000 | Port Vale | March 1950 | |
| 6 | (England) Bobby Robson | £25,000 | Fulham | March 1956 | |
| 7 | (England) John Kaye | £44,750 | Scunthorpe United | May 1963 | |
| 8 | (England) Colin Suggett | £100,000 | Sunderland | June 1969 | |
| 9 | (Scotland) Willie Johnston | £138,000 | (Scotland) Rangers | December 1972 | |
| 10 | (England) **David Mills** | **£516,000** | Middlesbrough | January 1979 | |
| 11 | (England) Peter Barnes | £748,000 | Manchester City | January 1979 | |
| 12 | (Republic of Ireland) Kevin Kilbane | £1,250,000 | Preston North End | 13 June 1997 | |
| 13 | (England) (Grenada) Jason Roberts | £2,000,000 | Bristol Rovers | 26 July 2000 | |
| 14 | (Wales) Jason Koumas | £2,250,000 | Tranmere Rovers | 29 August 2002 | |
| 15 | (England) Lee Hughes | £2,500,000 | Coventry City | 29 August 2002 | |
| 16 | (Denmark) Martin Albrechtsen | £2,700,000 | (Denmark) Copenhagen | 3 June 2004 | |
| 17 | (Wales) Robert Earnshaw | £3,500,000 | Cardiff City | 30 August 2004 | |
| 18 | (Spain) Borja Valero | £4,700,000 | (Spain) Mallorca | 22 August 2008 | |
| 19 | (Republic of Ireland) Shane Long | £5 million | Reading | 9 August 2011 | ^{[C]} |
| 20 | (Benin) Stéphane Sessègnon | £6.6 million | Sunderland | 2 September 2013 | |
| 21 | (Nigeria) Brown Ideye | £10 million | (Ukraine) Dynamo Kyiv | 18 July 2014 | |
| 22 | (Venezuela) Salomón Rondón | £12 million | (Russia) Zenit Saint Petersburg | 10 August 2015 | |
| 23 | (Belgium) Nacer Chadli | £13 million | Tottenham Hotspur | 29 August 2016 | |
| 24 | (Scotland) Oliver Burke | £15 million | (Germany) RB Leipzig | 25 August 2017 | |

=== Highest transfer fees received ===
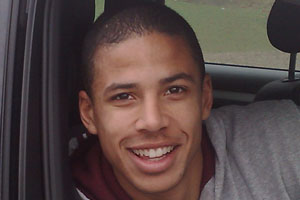
The second highest transfer fee received by Albion was more than £10 million for Curtis Davies in 2008.

| Rank | Player | Fee | Received from | Date | Notes |
|---|---|---|---|---|---|
| 1 | (England) Saido Berahino | £15 million | (England) Stoke City | 28 January 2017 | |
| 2 | Torbjorn Heggem | £10 million | Bologna FC 1909 | 13 August 2025 | |
| 3 | (England) Curtis Davies | £10 million | (England) Aston Villa | 3 July 2008 | |
| 4 | (Republic of Ireland) Shane Long | £7 million | (England) Hull City | 17 January 2014 | |
| 5 | (Senegal) Diomansy Kamara | £6 million | (England) Fulham | 9 July 2007 | |
| 6 | (Wales) Jason Koumas | £5.3 million | (England) Wigan Athletic | 10 July 2007 | |
| 7 | (England) Lee Hughes | £5,000,001 | (England) Coventry City | 8 August 2001 | |

== Managerial records ==
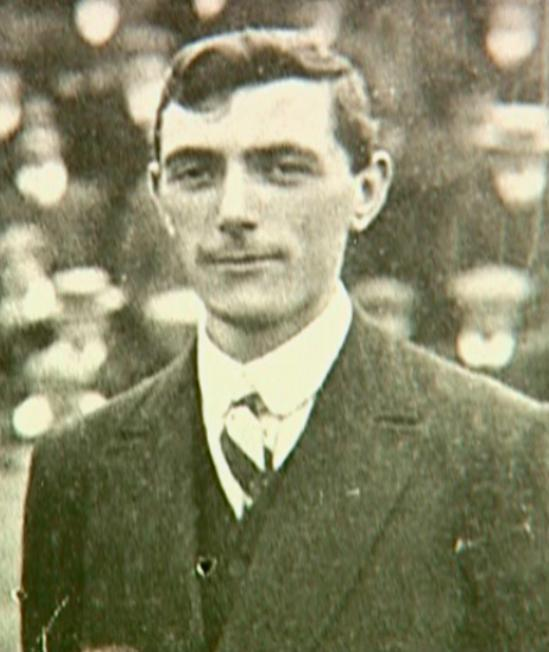
Fred Everiss, longest serving secretary-manager

- First secretary-manager: Louis Ford (fulfilled the role from 1890 to 1892)
- Longest serving secretary-manager: Fred Everiss (fulfilled the role from 1902 to 1948, an English record)
- First full-time manager: Jack Smith (managed the club between 1948 and 1952)
- Longest serving full-time manager: Vic Buckingham (managed the club from February 1953 to August 1959)

== Club records ==
=== Goals ===
- Most league goals scored in a season: 105 in 42 matches, Second Division, 1929–30
- Fewest league goals scored in a season: 29 in 38 matches, Premier League, 2002–03
- Most league goals conceded in a season: 98 in 42 matches, First Division, 1936–37
- Fewest league goals conceded in a season: 27 in 38 matches, Second Division, 1908–09

=== Points ===
- Most points in a season:
  - Two points for a win: 60 (in 42 games in 1919–20), First Division
  - Three points for a win: 91 (in 46 games in 2009–10), Championship
- Fewest points in a season:
  - Two points for a win: 12 (in 22 games in 1890–91, First Division)
  - Three points for a win: 24 (in 42 games in 1985–86, First Division)

=== Matches ===
==== Firsts ====
- First match: West Bromwich Strollers 0–0 Hudson's, a 12-a-side friendly match on 23 November 1878
- First competitive match: Calthorpe 2–3 West Bromwich Albion, Birmingham Senior Cup first round, 12 November 1881
- First FA Cup match: West Bromwich Albion 0–2 Wednesbury Town, first round, 10 November 1883
- First league match: Stoke 0–2 West Bromwich Albion, Football League, at the Victoria Ground, 8 September 1888
- First match at The Hawthorns: West Bromwich Albion 1–1 Derby County, 3 September 1900
- First floodlit match at The Hawthorns: West Bromwich Albion 1–1 Chelsea, Football League First Division, 18 September 1957
- First League Cup match: West Bromwich Albion 3–1 Walsall, second round, 22 September 1965
- First European match: DOS Utrecht 1–1 West Bromwich Albion, Inter-Cities Fairs Cup, second round, 2 November 1966
- First Premier League match: Manchester United 1–0 West Bromwich Albion, 17 August 2002

==== Wins ====
- Record league win: 12–0 vs Darwen, First Division, 4 April 1892 (English top division joint record)^{[D]}
- Record Premier League win: 4–0 vs Everton, 19 November 2005; 5–1 vs Wolverhampton Wanderers, 12 February 2012; 4–0 vs Sunderland, 25 February 2012; 4–0 vs Burnley, 28 September 2014; 4–0 vs Burnley, 21 November 2016
- Record FA Cup win: 10–1 vs Chatham, third round, 2 March 1889
- Record League Cup win: 6–1 vs Coventry City, fourth round replay, 10 November 1965 and 6–1 vs Aston Villa, second round, 14 September 1966
- Record European win: 4–0 vs FC Dinamo București, UEFA Cup Winners' Cup, second round second leg, 27 November 1968^{[E]}

==== Defeats ====
- Record league defeat: 3–10 vs Stoke City, First Division, 4 February 1937
- Record Premier League defeat: 0–6 vs Liverpool, 26 April 2003 and 0–6 vs Chelsea, 14 August 2010
- Record FA Cup defeat: 0–5 vs Leeds United, fourth round, 18 February 1967
- Record League Cup defeat: 0–6 vs Arsenal, second round, 25 August 2021
- Record European defeat: 0–3 vs Bologna F.C. 1909, Inter-Cities Fairs Cup, third round first leg, 1 February 1967^{[E]}

=== Consecutive results ===
- Record consecutive league wins: 11 (April – August 1930)
- Record consecutive league draws: 6 (October – November 2024)
- Record consecutive league defeats: 11 (October – December 1995)
- Record consecutive league games without defeat: 17 (December 1901 – March 1902; September – December 1957)
- Record consecutive league games without a win: 20 (August 2017 – January 2018)
- Record consecutive games without a win, all competitions: 21 (August 2017 – January 2018)
- Record consecutive league games without defeat from the start of the season: 10 (August – September 2021)
- Record consecutive games without a win from the start of the season: 12 (August – October 1985)

=== Attendances ===
==== Home attendances ====
Home attendance records listed are for games at The Hawthorns only (1900–present). For limited details of attendance records at Albion's previous grounds, see West Bromwich Albion F.C. former grounds.

- Highest league attendance: 60,945, vs Wolverhampton Wanderers, First Division, 4 March 1950
- Lowest league attendance and lowest overall attendance: 1,050, vs Sheffield United, First Division, 30 April 1901
- Highest FA Cup attendance and highest overall attendance: 64,815, vs Arsenal, sixth round, 6 March 1937
- Lowest FA Cup attendance: 5,230 vs Leicester Fosse, preliminary round, 14 January 1905
- Highest League Cup attendance: 41,188, vs Walsall, second round, 22 September 1965
- Lowest League Cup attendance: 6,288, vs Port Vale, second round first leg, 24 September 1985
- Highest home European attendance: 35,118, vs Valencia CF, UEFA Cup fourth round second leg, 6 December 1978
- Lowest home European attendance: 16,745, vs Grasshoppers Zurich, UEFA Cup fourth round second leg, 30 September 1981^{[E]}
- Highest all-seated attendance: 27,751 vs Portsmouth, Premier League, 15 May 2005

==== Away and neutral attendances ====
- Highest away European attendance: 95,300, vs Red Star Belgrade, UEFA Cup, 7 March 1979
- Lowest away European attendance: 5,500, vs DOS Utrecht, Inter-Cities Fairs Cup, 2 November 1966
- Highest attendance at a neutral venue: 99,852 vs Preston North End, 1954 FA Cup Final, 1 May 1954

== Footnotes ==
A. As of May 2019, Brown is the third youngest player to appear in a Premier League match, after Harvey Elliott and Matthew Briggs.
B. The "Other" column constitutes goals and appearances (including those as a substitute) in the FA Charity Shield, European Cup Winners' Cup, Inter-Cities Fairs Cup, UEFA Cup, Anglo-Italian Cup, Texaco Cup, Watney Cup, Anglo-Scottish Cup, Tennent Caledonian Cup, Full Members Cup, Football League Trophy and in play-offs and test matches.
C. The fee for Long may rise to £6.5m with add-on clauses.
D. The record was equalled by Nottingham Forest when they beat Leicester Fosse by the same scoreline in April 1909.
E. Excludes Anglo-Italian Cup games
