= 1931 FA Cup final =

1931 FA Cup Final
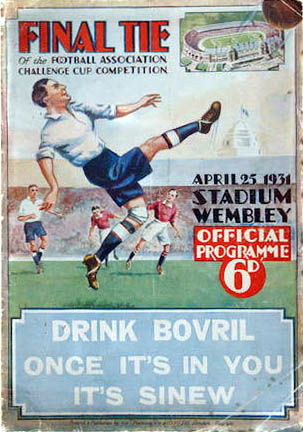
- Official programme
- Event: 1930–31 FA Cup
West Bromwich Albion	Birmingham
2	1
- Date: 25 April 1931
- Venue: Wembley Stadium, London
- Referee: Arthur H. Kingscott (Derbyshire)
- Attendance: 92,406

The 1931 FA Cup final was a football match between West Bromwich Albion and Birmingham, played on 25 April 1931 at the original Wembley Stadium in London. The showpiece event was the final match of the 1930–31 staging of English football's primary cup competition, the Football Association Challenge Cup (better known as the FA Cup). The match was the 56th FA Cup Final, the ninth to be played at Wembley.

West Bromwich Albion were appearing in their seventh final, having won the cup on two previous occasions, whereas Birmingham were playing in the final for the first time. Albion won the match 2–1, with both of their goals scored by W. G. Richardson. Joe Bradford had equalised Richardson's opening goal, before Richardson put the Baggies ahead again sixty seconds later.

== Route to the final ==
=== West Bromwich Albion ===
West Bromwich Albion
Round	Opposition	Score
3rd	Charlton Athletic (h)	2–2
3rd	Charlton Athletic (a)	1–1
3rd	Charlton Athletic (n)	3–1
4th	Tottenham Hotspur (h)	1–0
5th	Portsmouth (a)	1–0
6th	Wolverhampton Wanderers (h)	1–1
6th	Wolverhampton Wanderers (a)	2–1
Semi-final	Everton (n)	1–0

Birmingham and West Bromwich Albion were playing in the First Division and Second Division respectively, thus both entered the competition at the third round stage.

Albion began their cup campaign by drawing 2–2 at home against Charlton Athletic, with goals from Stan Wood and Teddy Sandford. The replay at The Valley also ended in a draw (1–1), and with extra time unable to separate the teams, a second replay was required at Villa Park, where goals from Joe Carter, Stan Wood and W. G. Richardson gave Albion a 3–1 victory. Wood also scored the only goal of the game in round four against Tottenham Hotspur to set up a fifth round tie with First Division Portsmouth, the only top division side that Albion faced en route to Wembley; W. G. Richardson's goal was enough to give Albion a 1–0 victory. The quarter-final stage saw Albion paired with local rivals Wolverhampton Wanderers, whom they had already beaten both home and away during the league season. After a 1–1 draw at The Hawthorns, Albion won the replay at Molineux 2–1, thanks to goals from W. G. Richardson and Stan Wood.

In the semi-final at Old Trafford, Albion faced Everton, who at that time were 13 points clear at the top of the Second Division. Everton dominated the first half but were unable to score from any of the chances they created, and it was Albion who broke the deadlock ten minutes into the second half. Albion captain Tommy Glidden played the ball into the Everton penalty area from near the halfway line, and aided by a gust of wind it sailed past Everton goalkeeper Billy Coggins and into the net. The match was played in front of 69,241 spectators, setting a new attendance record for Old Trafford.

=== Birmingham ===
Birmingham
Round	Opposition	Score
3rd	Liverpool (a)	2–0
4th	Port Vale (h)	2–0
5th	Watford (h)	3–0
6th	Chelsea (h)	2–2
6th	Chelsea (a)	3–0
Semi-final	Sunderland (n)	2–0

In the third round, Birmingham "won finely" at Anfield to defeat First Division opponents Liverpool 2–0, with goals from Ernie Curtis and Joe Bradford. In the fourth, they repeated the scoreline at home to Port Vale of the Second Division, both goals scored by Bradford, and went one better in the fifth, Bradford scoring once and Curtis, "in magnificent form", twice to eliminate Third Division South club Watford.

Chelsea provided stiffer opposition for the Birmingham team, a number of whose players were still recovering from influenza, on a St Andrew's pitch treacherous after overnight sleet. The visitors had much the better of the first half. Alex Jackson gave them the lead, and, in blizzard conditions, George Mills appeared to have scored in a goalmouth scramble, only for the goal to be disallowed after the Birmingham players drew the referee's attention to his linesman who had flagged for the ball having gone out of play. Six minutes into the second half, the lead had changed hands. First George Briggs crossed for a Bradford header, then the same pair combined for Curtis to put Birmingham ahead. Birmingham's defence held out until a misplaced clearance by Bob Gregg allowed Jackie Crawford to equalise. The replay at Chelsea's Stamford Bridge attracted a crowd of 74,365, then a ground record, with 6,000 locked out; spectators broke through the barriers and sat round the edge of the pitch. Briggs, in front of an empty goal, allowed a centre from Curtis to pass between his legs – "an amazing miss" – before Chelsea centre-half John Townrow sustained an injury which forced him to leave the field. Chelsea reorganised their personnel, but early in the second half, right-half Sid Bishop was hurt twice in quick succession, leaving him in a worse condition than Townrow and his team short of numbers – no substitutes were permitted – with players in unaccustomed positions. Though they held out well, a goal from Jack Firth and two from Bradford, the second of which scored from an offside position, gave Birmingham a 3–0 victory.

Birmingham faced First Division Sunderland in the semi-final at Elland Road, Leeds. The Times predicted a "hard game" in which "the first goal ... may decide the result". After half an hour Birmingham took the lead via a powerful shot by Curtis. Sunderland's players appealed in vain for the award of a penalty for handling the ball, their forwards failed to take numerous chances, and Birmingham's England international goalkeeper Harry Hibbs – described by Sunderland's Bobby Gurney as playing "an absolute blinder" – made some fine saves. With three minutes left, Curtis's shot from a Bradford cross was blocked by Sunderland's goalkeeper, Bradford "rushed in to help his colleague and between them they scored the second goal".

== Build-up ==
Demand for cup final tickets far exceeded supply. West Bromwich Albion received 80,000 ticket applications from supporters but their allocation was only 7,500. Those who were successful travelled to Wembley on one of several excursion trains along the GWR and LMS routes, or else by road.

In the days leading up to the final, both teams made use of mid-week games to test players who were doubtful due to injury. Following Birmingham's reserve match against Huddersfield Town's reserves, George Briggs and Jimmy Cringan were pronounced fit to play in the final, but centre forward Joe Bradford's fitness was not decided until the Thursday morning. An injured knee had kept Bradford out of action since mid-March, and he played with the knee well bandaged during the match, which was played in front of "about 12,000" spectators at St Andrew's. Full back Bert Trentham was a doubt for Albion, but came through the first half of their friendly against Headingly "quite satisfactorily". The Birmingham team prepared for the final at Bushey, while the West Bromwich Albion team were based in Harrow. Both teams visited The Cenotaph in the week before the final, in order to lay wreaths.

The clubs had met in the FA Cup on four previous occasions, with Albion victorious each time. The first meeting of the two teams in the competition was in the 1885–86 semi-final, which was the furthest that Birmingham had progressed prior to their first FA Cup final in 1931. Neither club had played a match at Wembley before, though Albion had experienced success in the FA Cup, having appeared in the final on six previous occasions and having won the cup twice, in 1888 and 1892. The two goalkeepers for the 1931 final, Harold Pearson and Harry Hibbs, were cousins. Pearson's father and Hibbs' uncle, Hubert Pearson, had kept goal for Albion during their last appearance in the final in 1912. Birmingham outside forward Ernie Curtis had already gained a cup winners medal with Cardiff City in 1927, while the club's trainer Archie Taylor had played in the Barnsley team that defeated West Bromwich Albion in the 1912 final.

Typical of the era was that the final had little effect on the weekend's Football League fixtures. Although the scheduled league matches of both finalists had been postponed, there were still nine First Division games and ten Second Division games played on the day of the final, as well as a full programme of matches in the Third Division North and South.

Prior to kickoff, T. P. Ratcliff led the crowd in community singing, backed by the band of His Majesty's Welsh Guards. Songs included "Daisy Bell", "John Brown's Body" and "Poor Old Joe".

== Match ==
=== Summary ===
Both teams employed the formation typical of the era: two full backs, three half backs, comprising one centre-half and two wing-halves, and five forwards, comprising two outside forwards, two inside forwards and a centre-forward.

In the sixth minute, Bob Gregg headed Jimmy Cringan's free kick past the stranded West Bromwich Albion goalkeeper, but the linesman flagged Gregg offside and the goal was disallowed; newspaper reports suggest the decision was incorrect. Albion took the lead after 24 minutes when Joe Carter received the ball from Tommy Glidden and took it almost to the by-line before crossing it. As W. G. Richardson attempted a shot he fell, but Birmingham's Ned Barkas inadvertently touched the ball back to him and away from his goalkeeper, and Richardson was able to recover sufficiently to steer it home. Joe Bradford and Johnny Crosbie both missed good chances for Birmingham before half-time.

In the second half, after Albion had failed to take several chances, Birmingham equalised. Bradford controlled a long ball, pivoted and shot past Pearson from 25 yards. But the lead did not last. Straight from the restart, Carter, W. G. Richardson and Teddy Sandford took the ball directly down the field. George Liddell sliced his attempted clearance, which left the ball at Richardson's feet, and the forward had an easy task to beat Hibbs from close range.

=== Details ===
25 April 1931
15:00 BST

West Bromwich Albion	2–1	Birmingham
W. G. Richardson 25', 58'	(Report)	Bradford 57'

Wembley Stadium, London
Attendance: 92,406
Referee: Arthur H. Kingscott (Derbyshire)

West Bromwich Albion	Birmingham

GK	(England) Harold Pearson
DF	(England) George Shaw
DF	(England) Bert Trentham
MF	(England) Tommy Magee
MF	(England) Bill Richardson
MF	(England) Jimmy Edwards
FW	(England) Tommy Glidden (c)
FW	(England) Joe Carter
FW	(England) W. G. Richardson
FW	(England) Teddy Sandford
FW	(England) Stan Wood
Secretary-Manager:
Fred Everiss

GK	(England) Harry Hibbs
DF	(England) George Liddell
DF	(England) Ned Barkas (c)
MF	(Scotland) Jimmy Cringan
MF	(England) George Morrall
MF	(Scotland) Alec Leslie
FW	(England) George Briggs
FW	(Scotland) Johnny Crosbie
FW	(England) Joe Bradford
FW	(England) Bob Gregg
FW	(Wales) Ernie Curtis
Manager:
Leslie Knighton

== Post-match ==
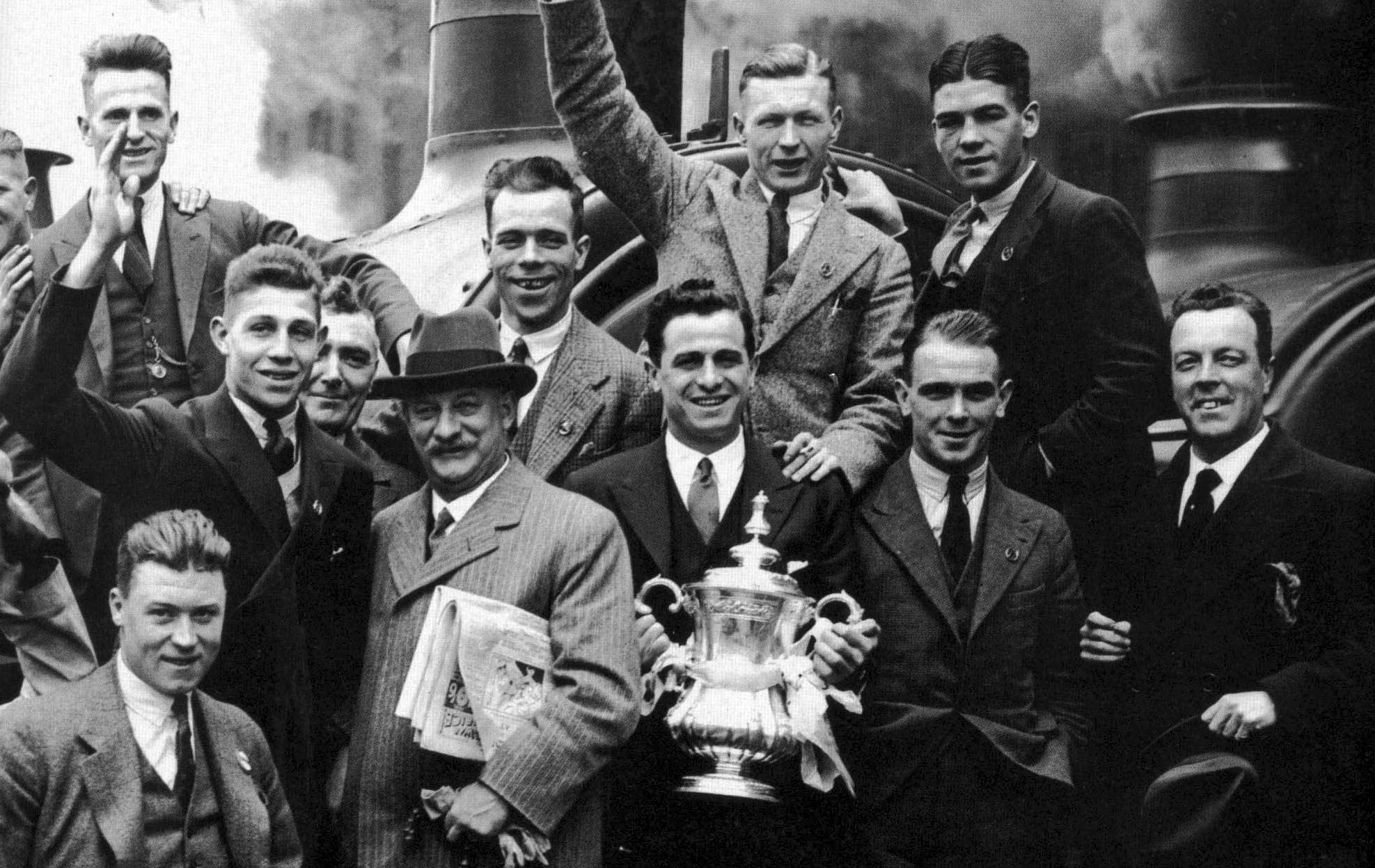
The Albion team display the FA Cup at Paddington Station after their victory in the final

The match was reported in that evening's Sports Argus, which was produced in a special run on blue paper in place of the normal pink. Copies of the newspaper were flown down to the London hotels of both teams after the match.

Birmingham's players, together with their wives, club officials, civic representatives and survivors of the 1886 semi-final, attended a dinner at the Russell Hotel after the match. Speaking afterwards, Archie Taylor admitted that the better side had won, that Albion set out to play the game properly, and that "our boys never settled down; they found the ball red-hot and could not hold it". The following day players and wives took a coach trip to the seaside at Brighton, and on Monday afternoon returned to Birmingham by train, to be met by the Lord Mayor and by cheering crowds lining the roads from the station up to the Council House. Albion's players visited Madame Tussauds, where waxworks of the two captains were on display, and some took their wives shopping, before taking the train home.

Trains arrived from London every quarter-hour until 5 a.m., to be met by buses which ran all night to various parts of the city, to make the journey home as easy as possible for the estimated 28,000 travelling supporters. The Birmingham Mail was impressed by their behaviour: "in a great local clash, in which one set of supporters had necessarily to face disappointment, there appeared to be no frayed tempers and little evidence of over-indulgence." The Mail's editorial highlighted the Birmingham players' reaction to the disallowed goal as illustrative of the sportsmanship of both sets of players: "there was no swarming round the official in the clamorous and excited manner so often seen in League games, but just a quiet and philosophic acceptance of the ruling and the position."

In the week following their victory in the final, West Bromwich Albion still had two remaining league fixtures to complete. They beat Stoke City 1–0 away in mid-week before a 3–2 win at home to Charlton Athletic on the following Saturday confirmed the club's promotion to the First Division. The "double" of winning the FA Cup and promotion in the same season has not been achieved before or since.

This would be the last time the FA Cup was won by a team from outside the top flight of English football until 42 years later when Sunderland beat Leeds in the 1973 FA Cup Final.

Teddy Sandford, who played on the winning side, is believed to have been the last surviving player from the game when he died in May 1995 at the age of 84.

== See also ==
- 1930–31 in English football
