= Kingscott (surname) =

Kingscott is a surname of English origin. Notable people with the surname include:

- Arthur Kingscott (1864–1937), English soccer referee and administrator
- Harry Kingscott (1890–1956), English soccer referee
