= Billy Coggins =

English footballer

Personal information
- Full name: William Herbert Coggins
- Date of birth: September 16, 1901
- Place of birth: Bristol, England
- Date of death: July 1958 (aged 56–57)
- Place of death: Backwell, Somerset
- Position: Goalkeeper

Youth career
- Victoria Albion
- Bristol St George

Senior career*
Years	Team	Apps	(Gls)
1925–1930	Bristol City	171	(0)
1930–1935	Everton	56	(0)
1935–1936	Queens Park Rangers	6	(0)
- Bath City
- * Club domestic league appearances and goals

William Herbert Coggins (16 September 1901 – July 1958) was an English footballer who played as a goalkeeper. He played for Everton in the 1931 FA Cup semi-final.

== Playing career ==
Coggins was born in Bristol playing local football with Victoria Albion and representing the Bristol Suburban League XI. He joined Bristol St George before Alex Raisbeck signed him for Bristol City in September 1925, then playing in the Football League Third Division South. Coggins replaced Frank Vallis in goal to make his debut on Boxing Day 1925 in the 2–1 win at Southend United. He was an ever-present member of the City side that won the Third Division South title in 1926–27, thus gaining promotion to the Second Division. He spent a further three seasons at Ashton Gate making 41 appearances in 1927–28, 40 appearances in 1928–29 and 26 appearances in 1929–30 before losing his place to George Newlands. Bristol City only just avoided relegation finishing 20th in both 1928–29 and 1929–30. Coggins joined Everton in March 1930 for £2,000.

Coggins took over in goal from Ted Sagar for the rest of the season, but was unable to prevent Everton being relegated from the First Division for the first time in the club's history.

Coggins retained his place for the 1930–31 season as, fired by Dixie Dean's goals, Everton took the title by a margin of seven points over West Bromwich Albion. Over Easter 1931, Everton played Coggins' former team, Bristol City twice. For the first match at Ashton Gate, Coggins was appointed captain, leading his side to a 1–0 victory, with the goal coming from Jimmy Stein, but City won the return match at Goodison Park 3–1.

Coggins also featured in Everton's run to the 1931 FA Cup Semi-final which was played at Old Trafford against West Bromwich Albion on 14 March 1931. Everton dominated the first half but were unable to score from any of the chances they created, and it was Albion who broke the deadlock ten minutes into the second half. Albion captain Tommy Glidden played the ball into the Everton penalty area from near the halfway line, and aided by a gust of wind it sailed past Coggins and into the net to put Albion into the final.

Following Everton's return to the top flight, Ted Sagar reclaimed the goalkeeper's jersey, and Coggins only made three further appearances, his final first-team game coming on 10 February 1934.

Coggins had a trial at Queens Park Rangers in the 1935–36 season, when he made six league appearances, before playing out his career back in the west country with Bath City in the Southern League.

After retiring Billy Coggins became landlord of the "Rising Sun" pub in Backwell, near Bristol, where he died in July 1958. There is a stand named after him at the ground of Ashton & Backwell

== Honours ==
Bristol City

- Football League Third Division South championship: 1926–27

Everton

- Football League Second Division championship: 1930–31
