= Purcell (disambiguation) =

Henry Purcell (1659–1695) was an English composer.

Purcell may also refer to:

== Places ==
- Purcell, Missouri, a city in Jasper County, Missouri, United States
- Purcell, Oklahoma, a city in and the county seat of McClain County, Oklahoma, United States
- Purcell School, a specialist music school in Hertfordshire, England
- Purcell Mountains, a component of the Columbia Mountains, British Columbia, Canada

== Other uses ==
- The Purcell principle, a doctrine in United States election law
- Purcell (surname)
- Purcell (architects), formerly Purcell Miller Tritton, a British architectural firm founded in 1947
