= Bert Trentham =

English footballer

Personal information
- Full name: Herbert Francis Trentham
- Date of birth: 22 April 1908
- Place of birth: Chirbury, England
- Date of death: June 1979 (aged 71)
- Place of death: Birmingham, England
- Height: 5 ft 9 in (1.75 m)
- Position: Full back

Senior career*
Years	Team	Apps	(Gls)
1926–1929	Hereford United		
1929–1937	West Bromwich Albion	246	(0)
1937–1939	Hereford United		
1939–1942	Darlaston		
- * Club domestic league appearances and goals

Herbert Francis Trentham (22 April 1908 – June 1979) was an English footballer who played as a full back. He was nicknamed "Corker".

== Biography ==
Trentham was born in Chirbury, Shropshire and attended Chirbury St John's School. In his youth he played football for Knighton Town, Knighton Victoria and Knighton United. He joined Hereford United in April 1926 and remained with them until April 1929, when he signed for West Bromwich Albion for a £600 transfer fee. He made his Albion league debut in March 1930, in a Division Two match away at Blackpool. During the following season he helped the club to achieve promotion to the First Division and played in the 1931 FA Cup Final, in which Albion beat Birmingham 2–1. Trentham also appeared in the 1935 FA Cup Final, but this time earned only a runners-up medal as his team lost 4–2 to Sheffield Wednesday. After 272 appearances for West Bromwich Albion, he re-joined Hereford United on a free transfer in May 1937, remaining with the latter club until his move to Darlaston in August 1939. Following his retirement from football, Trentham ran an ironmonger's business in Ward End, Birmingham. He died in June 1979, aged 71.

== Honours ==
West Bromwich Albion

- FA Cup: 1930–31; runner-up: 1934–35
