= Joe Carter (footballer) =

English footballer (1899–1977)

Personal information
- Full name: Joseph Henry Carter
- Date of birth: 27 July 1899
- Place of birth: Aston, Birmingham, England
- Date of death: 7 January 1977 (aged 77)
- Place of death: Handsworth, Birmingham, England
- Height: 5 ft 10 in (1.78 m)
- Position: Inside forward

Senior career*
| Years | Team | Apps | (Gls) |
- West Bromwich Albion

International career
| 1926–1929 | England | 3 | (4) |
- * Club domestic league appearances and goals

Joseph Henry Carter (27 July 1899 – 7 January 1977) was an English footballer who played at inside-forward. He won three England caps, scoring four goals. Carter won an FA Cup winner's medal with West Bromwich Albion in 1931, also helping the team win promotion to Division One in the same season. In September 1931 he became the first ever Albion player to be sent off at The Hawthorns. He played in the 1935 FA Cup Final when Albion finished as runners-up to Sheffield Wednesday. He died of dehydration in 1977.

== Honours ==
West Bromwich Albion

- FA Cup: 1930–31; runner-up: 1934–35
