= Wilf Shaw =

English footballer

Personal information
- Full name: Wilfred Shaw
- Date of birth: 21 April 1912
- Place of birth: Rossington, Doncaster, England
- Date of death: 20 February 1945 (aged 32)
- Place of death: Reichswald Forest, Germany
- Height: 5 ft 10 1/2 in (1.79 m)
- Position: Right back

Youth career
- Rossington Colliery

Senior career*
Years	Team	Apps	(Gls)
1930–1944	Doncaster Rovers	180	(0)
- * Club domestic league appearances and goals

Wilfred Shaw (21 April 1912 – 20 February 1945) was an English footballer who played as a right back mainly for Doncaster Rovers. He was killed in action in World War II.

== Playing career ==
Shaw signed to Doncaster from local club Rossington Colliery for the start of the 1930–31 season, though didn't get his first game until 2 May 1931. The following season he made just 2 appearances, and it wasn't until the end of the 1933–34 season that he became a regular feature, playing in every league and FA Cup game in the 1934–35 season.

In December 1935, Smith was in the Doncaster team that played their first game against a club from outside the British Isles when they entertained F.C. Austria of Vienna, a game they eventually lost 1–2. He was also in the first Rovers side to venture abroad when they played a friendly against the Dutch International XI on 21 October 1936 at the Sparta Rotterdam Arena, losing 7–2.

During the first season of the war, Shaw was a regular feature for Doncaster in the East Midlands War League, though in each of the following two seasons he only played in one game. His last appearance for Rovers was on 24 October 1942 in a 2–4 home defeat to Sheffield United in the War League North. He was registered with Gloucester City for the 1941–42 season, though never played any competitive games.

== Personal life ==
His brother was George Shaw, who also played for Doncaster in the 1920s, and went on to be an FA Cup winner with West Bromwich Albion and made an appearance for England.

A private in the Argyll And Sutherland Highlanders, 2nd Bn, Shaw was killed in action on the Western Front during Operation Veritable on 20 February 1945. He is buried in the Reichswald Forest War Cemetery near Kleve in Germany, his name is on the War Memorial in Cantley, Doncaster.

== Honours ==
Doncaster Rovers

- Third Division North

Champions 1934–35
