= Harold Pearson (footballer, born 1908) =

English footballer (1908–94)

Personal information
- Full name: Harold Frederick Pearson
- Date of birth: 7 May 1908
- Place of birth: Tamworth, England
- Date of death: 2 November 1994 (aged 86)
- Place of death: West Bromwich, England
- Height: 6 ft 1 in (1.85 m)
- Position: Goalkeeper

Youth career
- Belgrave United
- Two Gates
- Nuneaton Town
- Tamworth Castle
- 1925: West Bromwich Albion (amateur)

Senior career*
Years	Team	Apps	(Gls)
1925–1937	West Bromwich Albion	281	(0)
1937–1940	Millwall	38	(0)
1939–1940	→ West Ham United (guest)	1	(0)

International career
1932	England	1	(0)
- * Club domestic league appearances and goals

Harold Frederick Pearson (7 May 1908 – 2 November 1994) was an English footballer who played at goalkeeper. He joined West Bromwich Albion in 1925 and made his debut in December 1927 in a Division Two match against South Shields. Pearson was on the 1931 FA Cup winning team. In 1932, he earned his only cap for England against Scotland at Wembley Stadium. Pearson also kept goal in the 1935 FA Cup Final. In 1937, he joined Millwall where he played until his retirement in 1940.

== Early life ==
Pearson was born in Tamworth. As a youngster he played football for Glascote United, Glascote Methodists, Belgrave YMCA, Belgrave United, Two Gates F.C., Nuneaton Town and Tamworth Castle.^{[A]} He joined West Bromwich Albion as an amateur in April 1925 and turned professional a month later.

== Football career ==
Harold Pearson made his debut in December 1927, in a Division Two match against South Shields. In 1930–31, he helped the club to achieve promotion to the First Division and played in the 1931 FA Cup Final, in which Albion beat Birmingham 2–1. In 1932, he earned his only cap for England, marking the occasion with a clean sheet in a 3–0 win over Scotland at Wembley Stadium.

Pearson kept goal in the 1935 FA Cup Final, but this time earned only a runners-up medal as his team lost 4–2 to Sheffield Wednesday. After making 303 appearances for West Bromwich Albion, he joined Millwall for a £300 transfer fee in August 1937. He remained with Millwall until his retirement in 1940, though he did appear as a guest player for West Ham United later in Second World War.

== Personal life and death ==
Pearson's father Hubert Pearson was also a goalkeeper. The two played together at Albion until Hubert's retirement in May 1926.

Pearson died in November 1994 at the age of 86. At the time, he was believed to be the oldest surviving former England international.

== Honours ==
West Bromwich Albion

- FA Cup: 1930–31; runner-up: 1934–35

== Notes ==
A. Some sources say that he played for Nuneaton Borough, however the team were known as Nuneaton Town at the time Pearson played for them.

== Bibliography ==
- Matthews, Tony (2005). The Who's Who of West Bromwich Albion. Breedon Books. pp. 172–173. ISBN 1-85983-474-4.
