= Tommy Magee =

England international association footballer & rugby league footballer

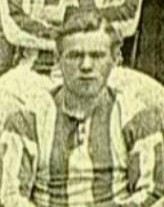

Personal information
- Full name: Thomas Patrick Magee
- Date of birth: 6 May 1899
- Place of birth: St Helens, England
- Date of death: May 1974 (aged 74–75)
- Place of death: Widnes, England
- Height: 5 ft 2 1/2 in (1.59 m)
- Position: Wing half

Youth career
- 1914–1915: Widnes Athletic (amateur)

Senior career*
Years	Team	Apps	(Gls)
1919–1934	West Bromwich Albion	394	(15)
1934–1935	Crystal Palace		
1935–19??	Runcorn		

International career
1923–1925	England	5	(0)
Rugby league career
Playing information
Club
Years	Team	Pld	T	G	FG	P
	St Helens Recreation RLFC
- * Club domestic league appearances and goals

Thomas Patrick Magee (6 May 1899 – May 1974) was an English professional footballer who played as a wing half. He made more than 400 appearances during his 15 years at West Bromwich Albion. He also won five England caps.

== Career ==
Born in St Helens, the first child of James and Agnes Magee, Tommy Magee attended St Marie's School. After playing rugby league for Appleton Hornets and St Helens Recs, he switched to football, playing for Widnes Athletic as an amateur during 1914–1915. He signed a contract with West Bromwich Albion while in the trenches of the First World War in 1918 and scored in his first match, helping Albion to a 3–1 victory against Derby County in the Midland Victory League in April 1919. Following the end of the First World War, The Football League resumed for the 1919–20 season, and Magee made his league début on the opening day of the campaign, against Oldham Athletic. In the following match, away at Newcastle United, he scored his first goal for the club. Albion went on to win the First Division that season, the only time in the club's history that they have been champions of England. Magee made a significant contribution, appearing in 24 out of 42 league games and scoring seven goals.

Although the next few seasons were less successful for Albion, Magee nonetheless won five caps for England during the 1920s. He made his international début against Wales on 5 March 1923, while his last cap was won two years later against France. Albion did manage another title challenge in 1924–25, when they finished as runners-up to Huddersfield Town. Magee played in all but two of the club's league matches during the season. In 1926–27 he was the only West Bromwich Albion player to appear in all 42 league matches, but the club were relegated to Division Two in 22nd (last) position.

He won a winners' medal with Albion when they beat Birmingham 2–1 in the 1931 FA Cup Final, and a few days later was part of the team that secured promotion as Second Division runners-up. As of October 2019, he remains the only Albion player to have won both a League Championship medal and an FA Cup winners' medal with the club.

Magee was married to Elizabeth, with whom he had two daughters. Elizabeth died of a brain haemorrhage in February 1932, aged 33. At just 5 ft 2 1/2 in (1.59 m) tall, Magee was the smallest ever player to appear for West Bromwich Albion's first team. His short stature earned him nicknames such as "Wee Tommy", "Pocket Hercules" and the "Mighty Atom". After 434 first team appearances for Albion (394 in the league), he joined Crystal Palace in May 1934 on a free transfer, becoming the club's player-coach. In 1935 he moved to Runcorn as player-manager; he later became a coach at the club before retiring from football around 1947. He died in his home town of Widnes in May 1974.

== Honours ==
West Bromwich Albion

- Football League First Division: 1919–20
- FA Cup: 1930–31
