= John Purcell =

John Purcell may refer to:

- John Purcell (author), Australian novelist
- John Purcell (VC) (1814–1857), Irish soldier in the British Army who received the Victoria Cross
- John Purcell (musician) (born 1952), American jazz saxophonist
- John Purcell (MP) (died 1665), Welsh politician
- John Purcell (physician) (1674?–1730), English physician
- John Baptist Purcell (1800–1883), Irish-born American prelate of the Roman Catholic Church
- Jack Purcell (1903–1991), Canadian badminton player
