= Alf Haynes =

English footballer

Alfred Haynes
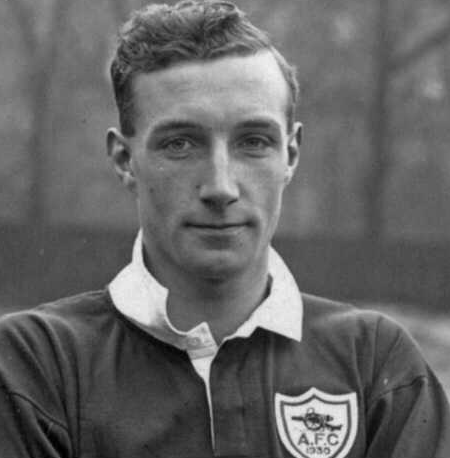
- Alfred sitting in his Arsenal F.C uniform

Personal information
- Full name: Alfred Edward Haynes
- Date of birth: 4 April 1907
- Place of birth: Oxford, England
- Date of death: 23 June 1953 (aged 46)
- Position: Half back

Youth career
- Oxford City

Senior career*
Years	Team	Apps	(Gls)
1928–1933	Arsenal	31	(1)
1933–1936	Crystal Palace	48	(1)
- * Club domestic league appearances and goals

Alfred Edward Haynes (4 April 1907 – 23 June 1953) was an English footballer.

Born in Oxford, Haynes started out at Oxford City before joining Arsenal aged 21 in 1928. A half back, he spent six seasons at Arsenal but only played 29 first-team games; however these coincided with the start of the club's first period of success under Herbert Chapman. Haynes made his debut against Liverpool on 21 December 1929 at Anfield, a game Arsenal lost 1–0. Nevertheless, Haynes played 14 games that season but missed out on the 1930 FA Cup Final, which Arsenal won, gaining their first major trophy.

Haynes continued to play mostly for the reserves, winning the London Combination three times. However, he missed out on a first-team winners' medal as he was only used sparingly as Arsenal won two League titles in 1930-31 and 1932-33. However, he did pick up a winners medal after playing in Arsenal's 1–0 defeat of West Bromwich Albion in the 1931 FA Charity Shield. His final appearance for Arsenal came against Blackburn Rovers on 7 October 1933.

Unable to oust the first-choice half backs of Frank Hill, Herbie Roberts and Bob John, Haynes was sold to Crystal Palace in November 1933, and played there for three seasons, retiring in 1936. He made 48 league appearances for Palace (51 in total) scoring once.

Haynes died in Oxford in 1953 at the age of 46.
