= Henry Purcell (judge) =

American judge

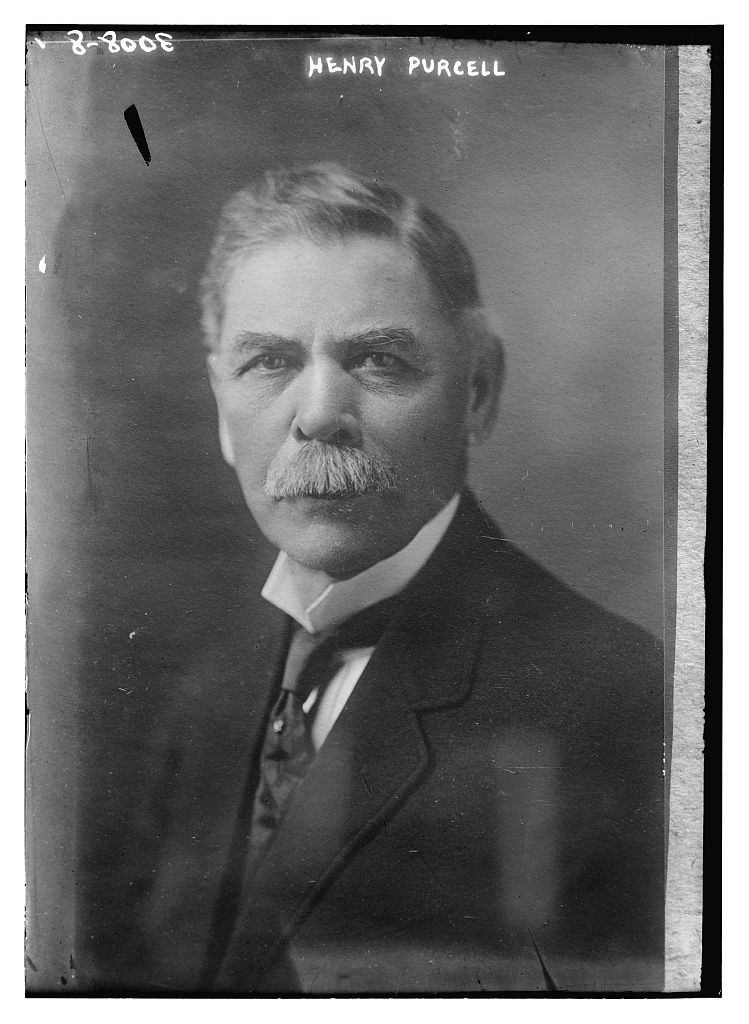
Henry Purcell between c. 1910 and c. 1915

Henry Purcell (1844 – January 21, 1931) was a justice of the New York Supreme Court.
