= Gillis Philip Purcell =

Canadian journalist (1904–1987)

Gillis Philip Purcell OC
- Born: November 25, 1904; Brandon, Manitoba
- Died: November 16, 1987 (aged 82); Toronto, Ontario
- Education: University of Manitoba
- Years active: 1942–1969
- Organization(s): The Canadian Press (1945–1969); Tata Communications Canada (1963–1969)

Gillis Philip Purcell OC (November 25, 1904 – November 16, 1987) was a Canadian journalist who served as the General Manager of The Canadian Press from 1954 to 1969. He originally served as a Canadian Press war correspondent beginning in 1939, and shortly as a press officer attached to the 1st Div, Canadian Army in 1942.

== Biography ==
Purcell was born in Brandon, Manitoba on November 25, 1904. His father, Philip Purcell (1865–1939), was a editor at the Brandon Sun and telegraph editor of Manitoba Free Press. He graduated from the University of Manitoba in 1924. Purcell was general manager of the Canadian Press from 1945 to 1969, where he covered war. Alongside his role, he also served as the Director for the Tata Communications Canada from 1963 to 1969.

Purcell began serving as press officer attached to the 1st Div, Canadian Army in 1942. He was an Officer of the Order of Canada, was inducted into the Canadian News Hall of Fame in 1970 and the Canadian Football Hall of Fame in 1987, as a member of the Football Reporters of Canada wing.

== See also ==
- List of Canadian journalists
