= Fred Everiss =

English football manager and executive (1882–1951)

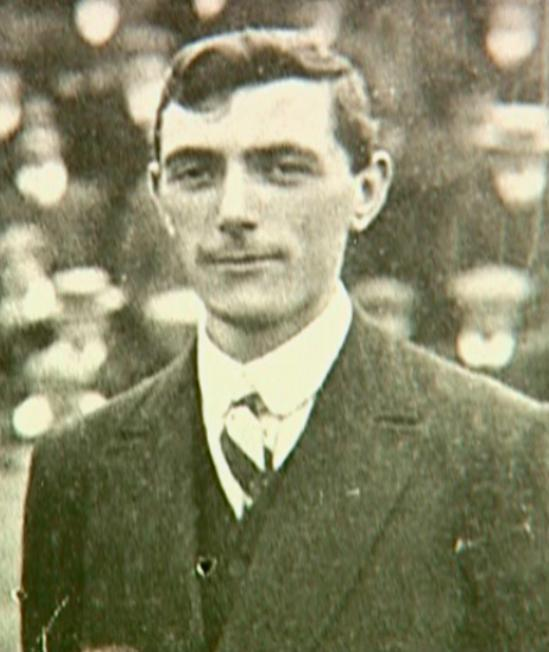

Personal information
- Date of birth: 27 May 1882
- Place of birth: West Bromwich, England
- Date of death: 4 March 1951 (aged 68)

Managerial career
- Years: Team
- 1902–1948: West Bromwich Albion

Fred Everiss (27 May 1882 – 4 March 1951) was secretary-manager of the English football club West Bromwich Albion for 46 years from 1902 to 1948, later serving the club as a director after retirement in 1948. Everiss led Albion to the League Title in the 1919–20 season and to the FA Cup in 1931.

Everiss joined Albion's office staff in 1896. He was appointed secretary-manager in 1902, a post he would hold until 1948. His 46 years in the job technically make him English football's longest-serving manager of all time, although much of his combined role was administrative, and the job of picking the team was left to the directors. Indeed, Albion did not create the full-time post of 'manager' until Everiss left his position. He was made a director upon his retirement in 1948 but died three years later in 1951 at the age of 68.

Everiss' son Alan joined the Albion staff in 1933. He was associated with the club for 66 years, serving as clerk, assistant-secretary, secretary, director and life member until his death in 1999 at the age of 81.

== Honours ==
Football League First Division

- Champions: 1919–20
- Runners-up: 1924–25

Football League Second Division

- Champions: 1901–02, 1910–11
- Runners-up: 1930–31

FA Cup

- Winners: 1931
- Runners-up: 1912, 1935
- Semi-finalists: 1907

FA Charity Shield

- Winners: 1920
- Runners-up: 1931

== See also ==
- List of English football championship winning managers
- List of longest managerial reigns in association football
- List of football managers with the most matches
