= W. G. Richardson =

English footballer (1909–1959)

W.G. Richardson
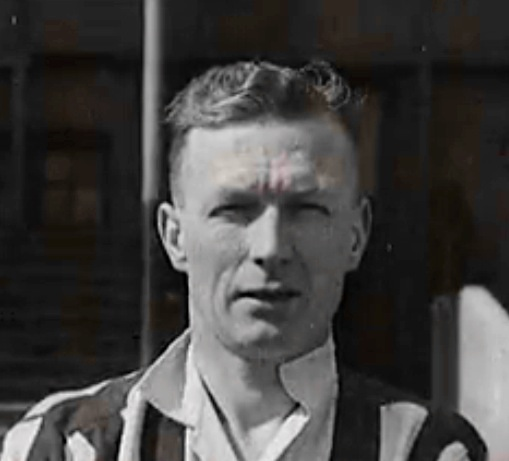

Personal information
- Full name: William Richardson
- Date of birth: 29 May 1909
- Place of birth: Framwellgate Moor, County Durham, England
- Date of death: 29 March 1959 (aged 49)
- Place of death: Perry Barr, Birmingham, England
- Height: 5 ft 8 in (1.73 m)
- Position: Centre forward

Youth career
- Horden Wednesday
- United Bus Company (Hartlepool)

Senior career*
Years	Team	Apps	(Gls)
1928–1929	Hartlepools United	29	(19)
1929–1945	West Bromwich Albion	320	(202)
1945–1946	Shrewsbury Town		
Total		349	(221)

International career
1935	England	1	(0)
- * Club domestic league appearances and goals

William "Ginger" Richardson (29 May 1909 – 29 March 1959) often referred to as W.G. Richardson and by the nickname 'Ginger' to avoid confusion with teammate Bill Richardson, was an English professional footballer who played as a centre forward.

He scored both goals for West Bromwich Albion when they won the 1931 FA Cup Final, beating their Midlands rivals Birmingham City 2–1.

He scored four goals within the space of five minutes, all within the first ten minutes of the match, for West Brom against West Ham United at Upton Park on 7 November 1931.

In the 1935–36 season, he scored 39 League goals, which is still West Bromwich Albion's club record for top scorer in the top division of the football league system. His total of 228 goals for the club in all competitions puts him third on the all-time scorers list behind Tony Brown and Ronnie Allen, and first in the goals-per-game list overall.

Richardson was the nephew of the English cricketer Tom Richardson. In 2004, he was named as one of West Bromwich Albion's 16 greatest players, in a poll organised as part of the club's 125th anniversary celebrations.

Richardson died on the field of play, during a charity match between a City of Birmingham 'All Stars XI' and a Television celebrity team, having stepped in at the last moment when the playing staff of Birmingham City were placed under quarantine due to a polio outbreak, which would claim the life of another former cup finalist, Jeff Hall a fortnight later.

== Honours ==
West Bromwich Albion

- FA Cup: 1930–31; runner-up: 1934–35
