= Jimmy Edwards (footballer, born 1905) =

English footballer

Personal information
- Full name: James Edwards
- Date of birth: 11 December 1905
- Place of birth: Tipton, England
- Date of death: April 1982 (aged 76)
- Place of death: West Bromwich, England
- Height: 5 ft 8 in (1.73 m)
- Positions: Left half; inside left

Senior career*
Years	Team	Apps	(Gls)
1926–1937	West Bromwich Albion		
1937	Norwich City		
- * Club domestic league appearances and goals

James Edwards (11 December 1905 – April 1982) was an English footballer who played as a left half or inside left.

== Career ==
Edwards was born in Tipton, Staffordshire. He joined West Bromwich Albion for a £350 fee in May 1926 and made his league debut for the club in March 1928 against Hull City. He was a member of the team that won the FA Cup in 1931 and promotion to the Football League First Division in the same year.

In May 1937 he moved to Norwich City for £750. He died in a West Bromwich hospital in April 1982 after becoming ill at his house in Birmingham New Road, Dudley.

== Honours ==
West Bromwich Albion

- FA Cup: 1930–31; runner-up: 1934–35
