= John Purcell (author) =

Australian author (born 1972)

- Born: John Purcell; June 1972 (age 54); Sydney, Australia
- Occupations: Novelist and Bookseller
- Website: johnpurcellauthor.com

John Purcell (born 1972) is an Australian author whose novels include The Secret Lives of Emma (under the pseudonym Natasha Walker) published by Penguin Random House in 2012 and The Girl on the Page, published by HarperCollins Australia in October 2018. He is also the Director of Books at Booktopia (Australia's largest online bookseller) and Angus & Robertson Bookworld. He appears regularly in print, on television and at Australian writers' festivals to talk about books and the publishing industry.

== Early life ==
John Purcell was born in Sydney and grew up in the wealthy lower-north-shore suburb of Mosman. He attended Mosman High School and was in his final months of school when his teachers figured out he could barely read due to undiagnosed dyslexia. 'Then a teacher put a copy of Catch-22 in my hands and that changed my life,' John has said. He still failed his exams but had fallen in love with books.

== Career as a bookseller ==
From 1999-2008, John owned and ran John's Bookshop, a second-hand bookshop located in Mosman. He has described this period of his life as his 'education' as a writer and says he spent more time reading and writing than selling books. He learned a great deal from his customers and frequently dissuaded them from buying the latest bestseller in favour of a Dostoevsky, a Hardy or an E.M. Forster. About this stage of his life, John has said, 'I had no interest in business. It was really a place for me to sit and pontificate, and I was completely anti most of the books in the universe. It was just the classics and the greatest writing possible.'

John closed 'John's Bookshop' in late 2008 when the building in which it was housed was to be redeveloped and joined the staff of booktopia.com.au, where he currently holds the title of Director of Books. In June 2017 he was nominated for Australian Bookseller of the Year. John has written about the extreme contrast between his two experiences of being a bookseller: 'Since leaving the second-hand bookshop I have become unrecognisable to myself. I have become the book guy at Australia's fastest growing online bookshop. I have published a series of erotic novels under a pseudonym. I have met and interviewed hundreds of authors and celebrities. I have worked closely with every major publisher in the country. And I rarely read a book by a dead person.'

== The Secret Lives of Emma ==
John's bestselling trilogy The Secret Lives of Emma began as a short story written 'to impress a girl'. John wrote a fuller version in his twenties, drawing inspiration from Henry Miller's graphic realism, but he made no attempt to have it published. It remained in a drawer until 2011 when, in the wake of the publication of Fifty Shades of Grey, publishers were "scrambling for erotic fiction".

The Secret Lives of Emma was published under the pseudonym 'Natasha Walker', which John says he used to protect his stepchildren from the adult content, as well as to safeguard his professional reputation. His publishers agreed as they believed readers would be more comfortable with a woman writing erotic fiction. It sold over 50,000 copies in print and eBook in its first year of publication and in 2012 John was the third-highest selling debut author in Australia. Caroline Overington broke the story of John's identity in The Australian Women's Weekly in May 2013, further increasing sales.

== The Girl on the Page ==
Purcell's second work, The Girl on the Page was acquired by HarperCollins Australia in January 2018 and was published under the imprint Fourth Estate. Publisher Catherine Milne said: ‘The joy of this novel isn’t just that it’s a complete page-turner. . . but that at its heart The Girl on the Page is a deeply serious and intelligent novel about the power of literature, which asks searching questions about art and commerce, integrity and authenticity’.

He has blogged about the novel, stating: 'Everything I had done up till now had been research for The Girl on the Page.'

The Girl on the Page was published in Australia in September 2018.

== The Lessons ==
Purcell's third book, The Lessons, was published by Fourth Estate in 2022.
