= Sarahbeth Purcell =

American author of fiction

Sarahbeth Purcell (born 1976 or 1977) is an American author of fiction. Her first book, Love Is The Drug, was published in 2003 in hardback and in trade paperback in 2004. Her second book, This is Not a Love Song, was published in trade paperback in 2005. Purcell is also a visual artist of both photography and paintings.
