= William Purcell =

William Purcell may refer to:

- William Purcell (d. 1834), last known survivor of HMS Bounty
- William E. Purcell (1856–1928), state senator from North Dakota
- William Frederick Purcell (1866–1919), arachnologist and biologist
- William Gray Purcell (1880–1965), architect
- William R. Purcell (born 1931), state senator from North Carolina
- William Purcell (priest) (1912–1994), Archdeacon of Dorking

== See also ==
- Bill Purcell (disambiguation)
- Bill Pursell, American musician
