= Stan Wood (footballer) =

English footballer

Stanley Wood
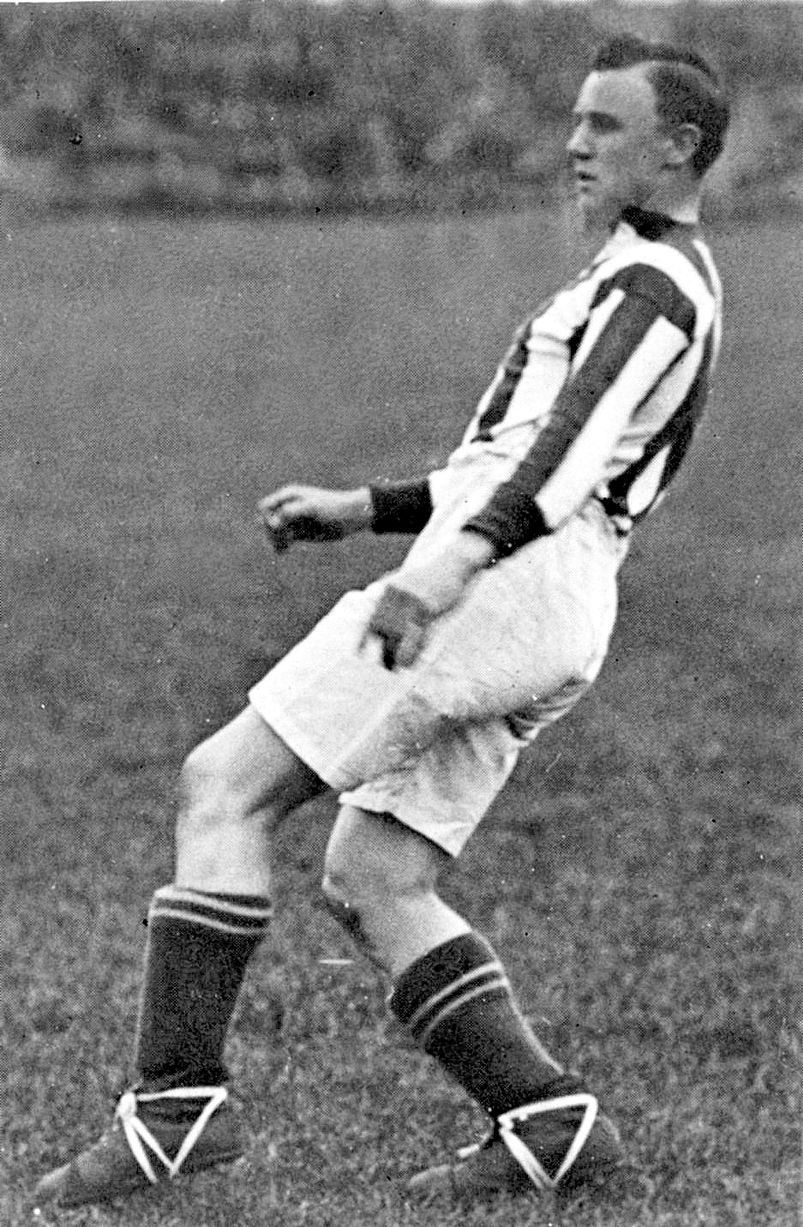
- Stanley Wood

Personal information
- Full name: Stanley Wood
- Date of birth: 23 July 1905
- Place of birth: Winsford, England
- Date of death: 17 February 1967 (aged 61)
- Place of death: Halifax, England
- Height: 5 ft 8 in (1.73 m)
- Position: Outside left

Senior career*
Years	Team	Apps	(Gls)
1928–1938	West Bromwich Albion	256	(58)
1938–1946	Halifax Town		
- * Club domestic league appearances and goals

Stanley Wood (23 July 1905 – 17 February 1967) was an English footballer who played as an outside left. During his professional career he represented West Bromwich Albion and Halifax Town.

== Career ==
Wood was born in Winsford, Cheshire and attended Meadow Bank School in Winsford Village. As a youth he played football for Whitegate Victoria and Winsford United, before turning professional with West Bromwich Albion in April 1928. He made his Albion debut in September of the same year, in a Division Two match against Notts County. He went on to make 281 appearances for the club, scoring 66 goals, and was part of the Albion side that won promotion to the First Division in 1930–31 and beat Birmingham 2–1 in the 1931 FA Cup Final.

In May 1938 Wood joined Halifax Town on a free transfer and represented them throughout the Second World War as well as appearing as a guest player for Huddersfield Town in 1941–42. He served as Halifax's trainer from 1946 to 1949. Wood died in Halifax on 17 February 1967.

== Honours ==
West Bromwich Albion

- FA Cup: 1930–31
