= Noel Purcell =

Noel Purcell may refer to:

- Noel Purcell (sportsman) (1899–1962), Irish sportsman in water polo and rugby union
- Noel Purcell (actor) (1900–1985), Irish film and television actor
