= Bill Purcell =

Bill Purcell may refer to:

- Bill Purcell (mayor) (born 1953), former mayor of Nashville, Tennessee
- Bill Purcell (ice hockey), ice hockey coach
- Bill Purcell (footballer) (1905–1986), Australian footballer

== See also ==
- Bill Pursell, American pianist
- William Purcell (disambiguation)
