= George Purcell =

English footballer

George Wilson Purcell (born 18 February 1905, date of death unknown) was an English professional footballer. Born in Barnsley, he played for Stockport County, Swindon Town, Exeter City and Gillingham between 1922 and 1934.
