= Harry Kingscott =

English football referee (1890–1956)

Arthur Henry "Harry" Kingscott (2 March 1890 – 17 November 1956) was the referee of the 1931 FA Cup Final and son of Arthur Kingscott, twice a Cup Final referee himself and FA Treasurer at the time of his son's appointment.

Harry Kingscott was an international referee taking charge of the Wales v Scotland Home International played at Wrexham in 1927 as well as the return fixture the following year in Glasgow.

He was on the Football League list from 1921 until 1933.

From "The Football Who's Who" edited by Frank Johnston (1935):

A. H. Kingscott needs no introduction to Derbyshire football fans. In fact, he needs no introduction to football followers in any part of the British Isles, for on April 25, 1931, Mr Kingscott was in charge of the FA Cup Final at Wembley. Thus, in realising the ambition which every referee must cherish, Mr Kingscott created a remarkable record - he had followed right in his father's footsteps as a Cup Final referee. Mr A. G. Kingscott had held the reins in 1900 and 1901. "AH", a Long Eaton man, born and bred, was a keen footballer himself, and played for 15 years, mainly with Sawley United and the 7th Hussars (in India) before embarking on his career as referee. In 1920, he was placed on the linesmen's list of the Football League and acted as linesman at the FA Cup Final of 1925. His big chance came when he was acting as linesman in the match, Sheffield Wednesday v. Bristol City. Just before half-time the referee became too ill to continue. Mr. Kingscott stepped into the breach and conducted the game in such fine style that shortly afterwards his name appeared on the referees' list. Apart from the Cup Final of 1931, the following games stand out among the high spots of his brilliant career: two FA Cup semi-finals; Holland v. Uruguay; Spain v. Italy; France v. Spain; Belgium v. Holland (twice) and the Amateur Cup Final of 1923.
