= Tommy Glidden =

English footballer

Personal information
- Full name: Thomas William Glidden
- Date of birth: 20 July 1902
- Place of birth: Coxlodge, Newcastle upon Tyne, England
- Date of death: 10 July 1974 (aged 71)
- Place of death: West Bromwich, England
- Position: Outside right

Youth career
- Colliery Old Boys
- Boldon Villa
- Sunderland West End

Senior career*
Years	Team	Apps	(Gls)
1922–1936	West Bromwich Albion	445	(135)
- * Club domestic league appearances and goals

Thomas William Glidden (20 July 1902 – 10 July 1974) was an English footballer who played at outside-right. He captained West Bromwich Albion to victory in the 1931 FA Cup Final, with the team also winning promotion to Division One in the same season.

== Honours ==
West Bromwich Albion

- FA Cup: 1930–31; runner-up: 1934–35
