= George Shaw (footballer, born 1899) =

English footballer

Personal information
- Full name: George Edward Shaw
- Date of birth: 13 October 1899
- Place of birth: Swinton, West Riding of Yorkshire, England
- Date of death: 10 March 1973 (aged 73)
- Place of death: Doncaster, England
- Height: 5 ft 10 in (1.78 m)
- Position: Full back

Youth career
- Bolton-on-Dearne
- Rossington Main Colliery

Senior career*
| Years | Team | Apps | (Gls) |
| 1920–1922 | Gillingham | 3 | (0) |
| 1922–1924 | Doncaster Rovers | 64 | (6) |
| 1924–1927 | Huddersfield Town | 29 | (0) |
| 1927–1938 | West Bromwich Albion | 393 | (11) |
| 1938–1939 | Stalybridge Celtic | | |
| 1939–1948 | Worcester City | | |

International career
| 1932 | England | 1 | (0) |

Managerial career
- 1938–1939: Stalybridge Celtic
- 1939–1948: Worcester City
- 1948–1951: Floriana
- * Club domestic league appearances and goals

George Edward Shaw (13 October 1899 – 10 March 1973) was an English professional footballer who played for Doncaster Rovers, Gillingham, Huddersfield Town, West Bromwich Albion, Stalybridge Celtic and Worcester City.

Shaw played for Gillingham for two seasons before moving back home up north to Doncaster to play for his local club Doncaster Rovers.

In a season which saw Doncaster become runners up in the Midland League and win the Wharncliffe Charity Cup, Shaw scored 6 league goals, 5 of them penalties, plus one penalty in the cup rounds. The following season, 1923–24, Rovers were selected for promotion back to the Football League for the first time since 1905. In their first match of the season Shaw managed to send his penalty kick into the stand, thus missing out on scoring their first return goal and failing to win the match. His last match for Doncaster was at Walsall on 26 January 1924, after which he transferred to Huddersfield Town to play in their first of three successive First Division Championship seasons.

He was the elder brother of Wilf Shaw, who also played full back for Doncaster Rovers, until he was killed in action in World War II.

== Honours ==
Doncaster Rovers

- Wharncliffe Charity Cup: 1922–23

Huddersfield Town

- Football League First Division: 1923–24, 1924–25, 1925–26

West Bromwich Albion

- FA Cup: 1930–31; runner-up: 1934–35

Floriana As Coach

- Malta League 1949–50, 1950-51
- Maltese Cup: 1948–49, 1949–50
- Cassar Cup: 1949–50
