= 1930–31 FA Cup =

Tournament details
- Country: England; Wales

Final positions
- Champions: West Bromwich Albion (3rd title)
- Runners-up: Birmingham

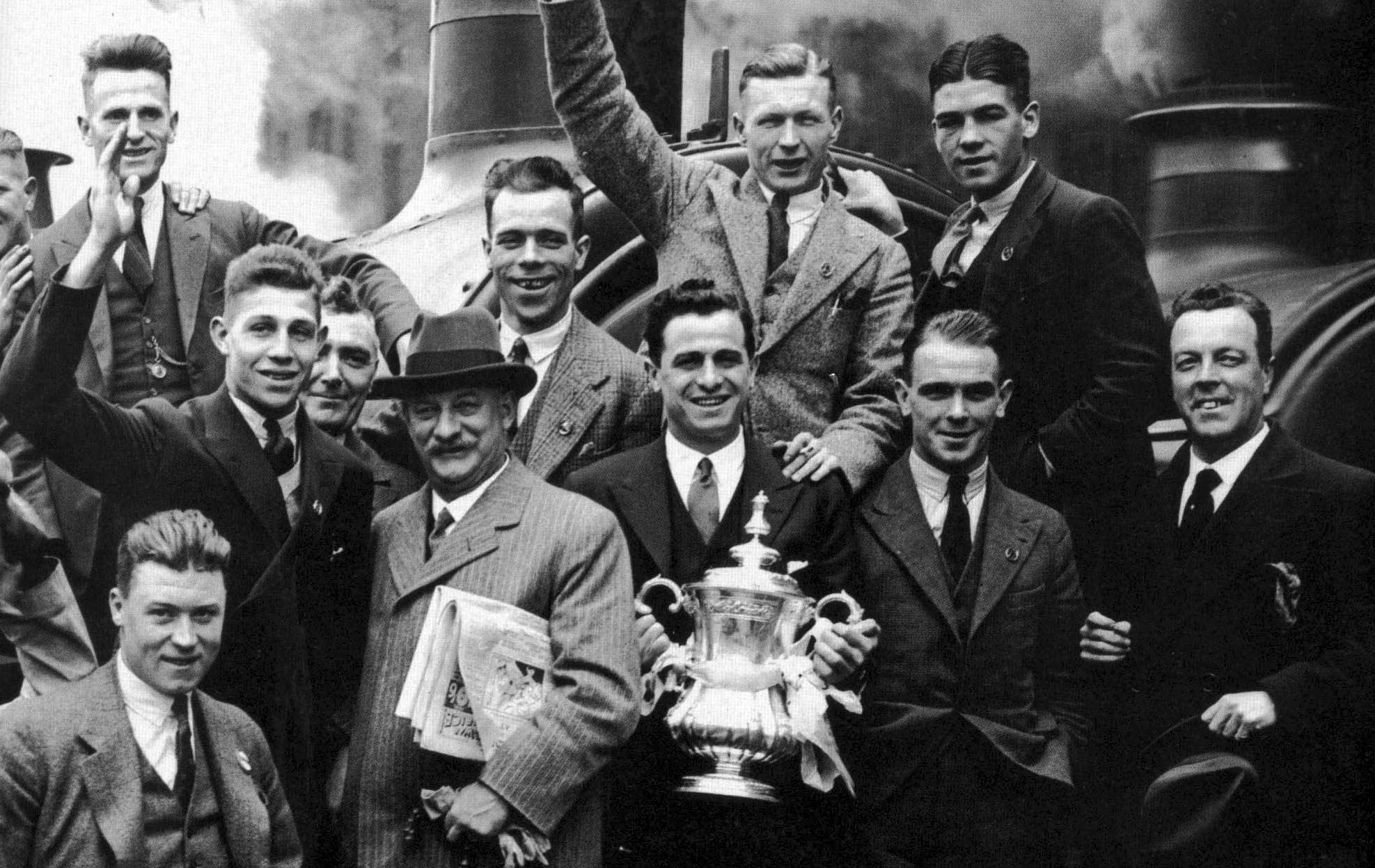
The West Bromwich Albion team celebrating their 1931 FA Cup Final victory.

The 1930–31 FA Cup was the 56th staging of the world's oldest football cup competition, the Football Association Challenge Cup, commonly known as the FA Cup. West Bromwich Albion of the Football League Second Division won the competition, beating First Division team Birmingham 2–1 in the final at Wembley, London. In doing so Albion became the first and to date only club to both win the cup and gain promotion in the same year.

Matches were played at the stadium of the team named first on the date specified for each round, which was always a Saturday. If scores were level after 90 minutes had been played, a replay would take place at the stadium of the second-named team later the same week. If the replayed match was drawn further replays would be held at neutral venues until a winner was determined. If scores were level after 90 minutes had been played in a replay, a 30-minute period of extra time would be played.

== Calendar ==
Round	Date
Extra preliminary round	Saturday 6 September 1930
Preliminary round	Saturday 20 September 1930
First qualifying round	Saturday 4 October 1930
Second qualifying round	Saturday 18 October 1930
Third qualifying round	Saturday 1 November 1930
Fourth qualifying round	Saturday 15 November 1930
First round proper	Saturday 29 November 1930
Second round	Saturday 13 December 1930
Third round	Saturday 10 January 1931
Fourth round	Saturday 24 January 1931
Fifth round	Saturday 14 February 1931
Sixth round	Saturday 28 February 1931
Semifinals	Saturday 14 March 1931
Final	Saturday 25 April 1931

== Qualifying rounds ==
Teams that were not members of the Football League competed in the qualifying rounds to secure one of 25 places available in the first round.

The winners from the fourth qualifying round were Scarborough, Jarrow, Workington, Lancaster Town, Rhyl Athletic, Wombwell, Gresley Rovers, Mansfield Town, Newark Town, Scunthorpe & Lindsey United, Gainsborough Trinity, Wellington Town, Peterborough & Fletton United, Kingstonian, Folkestone, Aldershot, Northfleet United, Sittingbourne, Tunbridge Wells Rangers, Walthamstow Avenue, Guildford City, Dulwich Hamlet, Wimbledon, Taunton Town and Merthyr Town.

Those appearing in the competition proper for the first time were Wombwell, Gresley Rovers, Walthamstow Avenue and Taunton Town, while Jarrow had not reached this stage since 1899-1900.

Rhyl Athletic was the most successful club from this season's extra preliminary round, defeating Chester, Macclesfield Town, Witton Albion, Winsford United, Colwyn Bay, and Prescot Cables before going out to Scarborough in the first round proper.

== Results ==
=== First round proper ===
At this stage clubs from the Football League Third Division North and South joined the 25 non-league clubs that came through the qualifying rounds. Hull City and Brighton & Hove Albion received byes to the third round.

Matches were played on Saturday, 29 November 1930. Six matches were drawn, with replays taking place later the same week.

Tie no	Home team	Score	Away team	Date	Attendance	Notes
1	Chesterfield	1–2	Notts County	29 November 1930		
2	Nelson	4–0	Workington	29 November 1930		
3	Rochdale	1–2	Doncaster Rovers	29 November 1930		
4	Walsall	1–0	Bournemouth & Boscombe Athletic	29 November 1930		
5	Folkestone	5–3	Sittingbourne	29 November 1930		
6	Gillingham	7–2	Guildford City	29 November 1930		
7	Crewe Alexandra	1–0	Jarrow	29 November 1930		
8	Lincoln City	8–3	Barrow	29 November 1930		
9	Luton Town	2–2	Clapton Orient	29 November 1930		
Replay	Clapton Orient	2–4	Luton Town	4 December 1930		
10	Gainsborough Trinity	1–0	Scunthorpe & Lindsey United	29 November 1930		
11	Scarborough	6–0	Rhyl Athletic	29 November 1930		
12	Wrexham	2–0	Wigan Borough	29 November 1930		
13	Ilford	1–6	Brentford	29 November 1930		
14	Tranmere Rovers	4–4	Gateshead	29 November 1930		
Replay	Gateshead	3–2	Tranmere Rovers	3 December 1930		
15	Wellington Town	0–0	Wombwell	29 November 1930		
Replay	Wombwell	0–3	Wellington Town	4 December 1930		
16	Queens Park Rangers	5–0	Thames	29 November 1930		
17	Fulham	1–1	Wimbledon	29 November 1930		
Replay	Wimbledon	0–6	Fulham	3 December 1930		
18	Accrington Stanley	3–1	Lancaster Town	29 November 1930		
19	Bristol Rovers	4–1	Merthyr Town	29 November 1930		
20	Northampton Town	1–2	Coventry City	29 November 1930		
21	Norwich City	2–0	Swindon Town	29 November 1930		
22	Northfleet United	0–3	Exeter City	29 November 1930		
23	Carlisle United	3–1	New Brighton	29 November 1930		
24	Tunbridge Wells Rangers	3–0	Kingstonian	29 November 1930		
25	Crystal Palace	6–0	Taunton Town	29 November 1930		
26	Southend United	0–1	Torquay United	29 November 1930		
27	Hartlepools United	2–3	Stockport County	29 November 1930		
28	Halifax Town	2–2	Mansfield Town	29 November 1930		
Replay	Mansfield Town	1–2	Halifax Town	3 December 1930		
29	Southport	4–2	Darlington	29 November 1930		
30	Dulwich Hamlet	2–2	Newport County	29 November 1930		
Replay	Newport County	4–1	Dulwich Hamlet	4 December 1930		
31	Walthamstow Avenue	1–5	Watford	29 November 1930		
32	York City	3–1	Gresley Rovers	29 November 1930		
33	Newark Town	2–1	Rotherham United	29 November 1930		
34	Aldershot	4–1	Peterborough & Fletton United	29 November 1930		

=== Second round proper ===
The matches were played on Saturday, 13 December 1930. Two matches were drawn, with replays taking place on Thursday, 18 December 1930.

Tie no	Home team	Score	Away team	Date	Attendance	Notes
1	Nelson	1–1	York City	13 December 1930		
Replay	York City	3–2	Nelson	18 December 1930		
2	Watford	3–1	Luton Town	13 December 1930		
3	Walsall	4–0	Newport County	13 December 1930		
4	Gillingham	1–3	Aldershot	13 December 1930		
5	Crewe Alexandra	2–4	Queens Park Rangers	13 December 1930		
6	Gainsborough Trinity	0–4	Southport	13 December 1930		
7	Scarborough	6–4	Lincoln City	13 December 1930		
8	Doncaster Rovers	0–1	Notts County	13 December 1930		
9	Wellington Town	2–4	Wrexham	13 December 1930		
10	Fulham	4–0	Halifax Town	13 December 1930		
11	Accrington Stanley	0–1	Torquay United	13 December 1930		
12	Brentford	1–0	Norwich City	13 December 1930		
13	Bristol Rovers	4–2	Stockport County	13 December 1930		
14	Carlisle United	4–2	Tunbridge Wells Rangers	13 December 1930		
15	Crystal Palace	6–0	Newark Town	13 December 1930		
16	Exeter City	1–1	Coventry City	13 December 1930		
Replay	Coventry City	1–2	Exeter City	18 December 1930		
17	Gateshead	3–2	Folkestone	13 December 1930		

=== Third round proper ===
The 44 First and Second Division clubs entered the competition at this stage, along with Hull City, Brighton & Hove Albion and amateur club Corinthian.

The matches were scheduled to be played on Saturday, 10 January 1931, though one was postponed until later the same week. Nine matches were drawn, with replays taking place later the same week. Three matches required a second replay; these were all played on Monday, 19 January 1931.

Aldershot and Scarborough were the last teams from the qualifying rounds remaining in the competition.

Tie no	Home team	Score	Away team	Date	Attendance	Notes
1	Burnley	3–0	Manchester City	10 January 1931		
2	Bury	1–1	Torquay United	10 January 1931		
Replay	Torquay United	1–2	Bury	14 January 1931		
3	Liverpool	0–2	Birmingham City	10 January 1931	43,907	
4	Leicester City	1–2	Brighton & Hove Albion	10 January 1931		
5	Notts County	3–1	Swansea Town	10 January 1931		
6	Blackburn Rovers	1–1	Walsall	10 January 1931		
Replay	Walsall	0–3	Blackburn Rovers	15 January 1931		
7	Bolton Wanderers	1–0	Carlisle United	10 January 1931		
8	Wolverhampton Wanderers	9–1	Wrexham	10 January 1931		
9	Middlesbrough	1–1	Bradford City	14 January 1931		
Replay	Bradford City	2–1	Middlesbrough	19 January 1931		
10	West Bromwich Albion	2–2	Charlton Athletic	10 January 1931	27,749	
Replay	Charlton Athletic	1–1	West Bromwich Albion	14 January 1931		
2nd replay	West Bromwich Albion	2–1	Charlton Athletic	19 January 1931	36,350	
11	Sunderland	2–0	Southampton	10 January 1931		
12	Scarborough	1–2	Grimsby Town	10 January 1931		
13	Sheffield United	1–1	York City	10 January 1931		
Replay	York City	0–2	Sheffield United	14 January 1931		
14	Newcastle United	4–0	Nottingham Forest	10 January 1931		
15	Tottenham Hotspur	3–1	Preston North End	10 January 1931		
16	Fulham	0–2	Portsmouth	10 January 1931		
17	Barnsley	4–1	Bristol City	10 January 1931		
18	Brentford	2–2	Cardiff City	10 January 1931		
Replay	Cardiff City	1–2	Brentford	14 January 1931		
19	Bristol Rovers	3–1	Queens Park Rangers	10 January 1931		
20	West Ham United	1–3	Chelsea	10 January 1931		
21	Plymouth Argyle	0–2	Everton	10 January 1931		
22	Hull City	1–2	Blackpool	10 January 1931		
23	Oldham Athletic	1–3	Watford	10 January 1931		
24	Crystal Palace	1–1	Reading	10 January 1931		
Replay	Reading	1–1	Crystal Palace	14 January 1931		
2nd replay	Crystal Palace	2–0	Reading	19 January 1931		
25	Exeter City	3–2	Derby County	10 January 1931		
26	Arsenal	2–2	Aston Villa	10 January 1931	40,864	
Replay	Aston Villa	1–3	Arsenal	14 January 1931	73,668	
27	Southport	3–1	Millwall	10 January 1931		
28	Leeds United	2–0	Huddersfield Town	10 January 1931		
29	Corinthian	1–3	Port Vale	10 January 1931		
30	Stoke City	3–3	Manchester United	10 January 1931		
Replay	Manchester United	0–0	Stoke City	14 January 1931		
2nd replay	Stoke City	2–4	Manchester United	19 January 1931		
31	Aldershot	0–1	Bradford Park Avenue	10 January 1931		
32	Gateshead	2–6	Sheffield Wednesday	10 January 1931		

=== Fourth round proper ===
The matches were played on Saturday, 24 January 1931. Two matches were drawn, the replays being played on Wednesday, 28 January 1931.

Tie no	Home team	Score	Away team	Date	Attendance	Summary
1	Birmingham City	2–0	Port Vale	24 January 1931	39,885	
2	Bury	1–2	Exeter City	24 January 1931		
3	Watford	2–0	Brighton & Hove Albion	24 January 1931		
4	Blackburn Rovers	5–1	Bristol Rovers	24 January 1931		
5	Bolton Wanderers	1–1	Sunderland	24 January 1931	36,602	
Replay	Sunderland	3–1	Bolton Wanderers	28 January 1931	46,914	
6	Grimsby Town	1–0	Manchester United	24 January 1931		
7	West Bromwich Albion	1–0	Tottenham Hotspur	24 January 1931	46,850	
8	Sheffield United	4–1	Notts County	24 January 1931		
9	Barnsley	2–1	Sheffield Wednesday	24 January 1931		
10	Brentford	0–1	Portsmouth	24 January 1931		
11	Bradford City	0–0	Wolverhampton Wanderers	24 January 1931		
Replay	Wolverhampton Wanderers	4–2	Bradford City	28 January 1931		
12	Crystal Palace	0–6	Everton	24 January 1931	38,000	
13	Chelsea	2–1	Arsenal	24 January 1931	62,945	
14	Bradford Park Avenue	2–0	Burnley	24 January 1931		
15	Southport	2–1	Blackpool	24 January 1931		
16	Leeds United	4–1	Newcastle United	24 January 1931		

=== Fifth round proper ===
The matches were played on Saturday, 14 February 1931. No replays were necessary.

Tie no	Home team	Score	Away team	Date	Attendance	Summary
1	Birmingham City	3–0	Watford	14 February 1931	49,729	
2	Sunderland	2–1	Sheffield United	14 February 1931	63,016	
3	Everton	5–3	Grimsby Town	14 February 1931	65,534	
4	Barnsley	1–3	Wolverhampton Wanderers	14 February 1931		
5	Portsmouth	0–1	West Bromwich Albion	14 February 1931	30,981	
6	Chelsea	3–0	Blackburn Rovers	14 February 1931	61,170	
7	Exeter City	3–1	Leeds United	14 February 1931		
8	Southport	1–0	Bradford Park Avenue	14 February 1931		

== Final rounds ==
=== Sixth round proper ===
28 February 1931

Birmingham	2 – 2	Chelsea
Bradford; Curtis		Jackson; Crawford

St Andrew's, Birmingham
Attendance: 55,298
28 February 1931

West Bromwich Albion	1 – 1	Wolverhampton Wanderers
W. G. Richardson		Shaw (o.g.)

The Hawthorns, West Bromwich
Attendance: 53,385
28 February 1931

Sunderland	1 – 1	Exeter City
Connor		Houghton

Roker Park, Sunderland
Attendance: 51,842
28 February 1931

Everton	9 – 1	Southport
Dean; Critchley; Dunn; Johnson		Waterston

Goodison Park, Liverpool
Attendance: 45,647

==== Replays ====
4 March 1931

Chelsea	0 – 3	Birmingham
		Firth; Bradford

Stamford Bridge, London
Attendance: 74,365
4 March 1931

Wolverhampton Wanderers	1 – 2	West Bromwich Albion
J. Deacon		Wood; W. G. Richardson

Molineux, Wolverhampton
Attendance: 46,860
4 March 1931

Exeter City	2 – 4	Sunderland
Varco; Purcell		Connor; Eden; Gurney

St James Park, Exeter
Attendance: 21,015

=== Semifinals ===
14 March 1931

Birmingham	2 – 0	Sunderland
Curtis

Elland Road, Leeds
Attendance: 43,570

14 March 1931

West Bromwich Albion	1 – 0	Everton
Glidden

Old Trafford, Manchester
Attendance: 75,000

=== Final ===
The final took place on Saturday, 25 April 1931 at Wembley and ended in a victory for West Bromwich Albion by 2–1, with goals scored by "Ginger" Richardson for West Bromwich Albion and Joe Bradford for Birmingham. The attendance was 92,406.

25 April 1931
15:00 BST

West Bromwich Albion	2 – 1	Birmingham
W. G. Richardson 25' 58'		Bradford 57'

Wembley, London
Attendance: 92,406
Referee: Arthur H Kingscott

West Bromwich Albion	Birmingham City
