= 1954 FA Charity Shield =

- Event: FA Charity Shield
Wolverhampton Wanderers	West Bromwich Albion
4	4
- Date: 29 September 1954
- Venue: Molineux, Wolverhampton
- Referee: George Gibson
- Attendance: 45,035

The 1954 FA Charity Shield was the 32nd FA Charity Shield, a football match between the winners of the previous season's First Division and FA Cup titles. This year's match was contested by league champions Wolverhampton Wanderers and FA Cup winners West Bromwich Albion.

The two Black Country rivals had been the main contenders for the league championship of the previous campaign, with Wolves edging out their challengers by four points in the end to claim their first ever league title. Albion had gained some consolation in winning their fourth FA Cup.

The match was held at Wolves' stadium, Molineux, in keeping with the trend of using the league champions' home that had been established at the turn of the decade. It was staged on an "international week" during the season, which caused several players – most notably, Wolves' captain Billy Wright – to miss the game as they were on duty with their national sides.

The hosts led the contest both 2–0 and 4–2, but were twice pegged back by rapid-fire replies. The game eventually ended 4–4, meaning the Shield was shared for the second time in its history.

== Match details ==
29 September 1954

Wolverhampton Wanderers	4–4	West Bromwich Albion
Swinbourne 12', 62'; Deeley 46'; Hancocks 73'		Allen 56', 57', 79'; Ryan 77'

Molineux, Wolverhampton
Attendance: 45,035
Referee: George Gibson

1	(England) Bert Williams
2	(England) Bill Guttridge
3	(England) Bill Shorthouse
4	(England) Ron Flowers (c)
5	(England) Eddie Russell
6	(England) Eddie Clamp
7	(England) Johnny Hancocks
8	(England) Peter Broadbent
9	(England) Roy Swinbourne
10	(England) Norman Deeley
11	(England) Dennis Wilshaw
Manager:
(England) Stan Cullis

1	(England) Jim Sanders
2	(England) Stan Rickaby
3	(England) Len Millard (c)
4	(England) Jimmy Dudley	(substituted off) *'
5	(England) Joe Kennedy
6	(England) Billy Brookes
7	(England) Frank Griffin
8	(Republic of Ireland) Reg Ryan
9	(England) Ronnie Allen
10	(England) Wilf Carter
11	(England) George Lee	Substituted off
Substitutes:
12	(England) Jimmy Dugdale	(substituted on) *'
14	(England) Ken Hodgkisson	Substituted on
Manager:
(England) Vic Buckingham
