= History of West Bromwich Albion F.C. =

History of an English football club

West Bromwich Albion Football Club are an English football club based in West Bromwich. The club's history dates back to its formation in 1878 as West Bromwich Strollers by workers from Salter's Spring Works in West Bromwich. The team was renamed West Bromwich Albion in 1880. Albion have played their home games at The Hawthorns since 1900.

Albion were one of the founding members of The Football League in 1888 and have spent the majority of their league history in English football's top division. They have won the league title once, in 1919–20, and been runners-up twice. The club has had more success in the FA Cup, with five wins. The first came in 1888, the year the league was founded, and the most recent in 1968, their last major trophy. They also won the Football League Cup at the first attempt in 1966. The club's longest consecutive period in the top division was between 1949 and 1973, and from 1986 to 2002 they spent their longest ever spell out of the top division. There has been something of a revival in recent years, with thirteen seasons spent in the Premier League since 2002.

== 1878–1902 ==
The club was founded in 1878 as West Bromwich Strollers in West Bromwich, then in Staffordshire but now part of the West Midlands administrative county. Older sources quote the year of formation as 1879, as evidence of the first Strollers match in 1878 came to light only as recently as 1993. The team played their first match on 23 November 1878, drawing 0–0 in a 12-a-side game against workers from Hudson's, a local soap factory. Most of the Strollers players worked at George Salter's Spring Works; many were keen cricketers and were looking for a sport to play during the winter months. The 'Strollers' name came about because there were no footballs on sale in West Bromwich, so a walk to nearby Wednesbury was necessary in order to buy one. They were renamed West Bromwich Albion in either 1879 or 1880, becoming the first team to adopt the Albion suffix. Albion was a district of West Bromwich where some of the players lived or worked, close to what is today Greets Green.

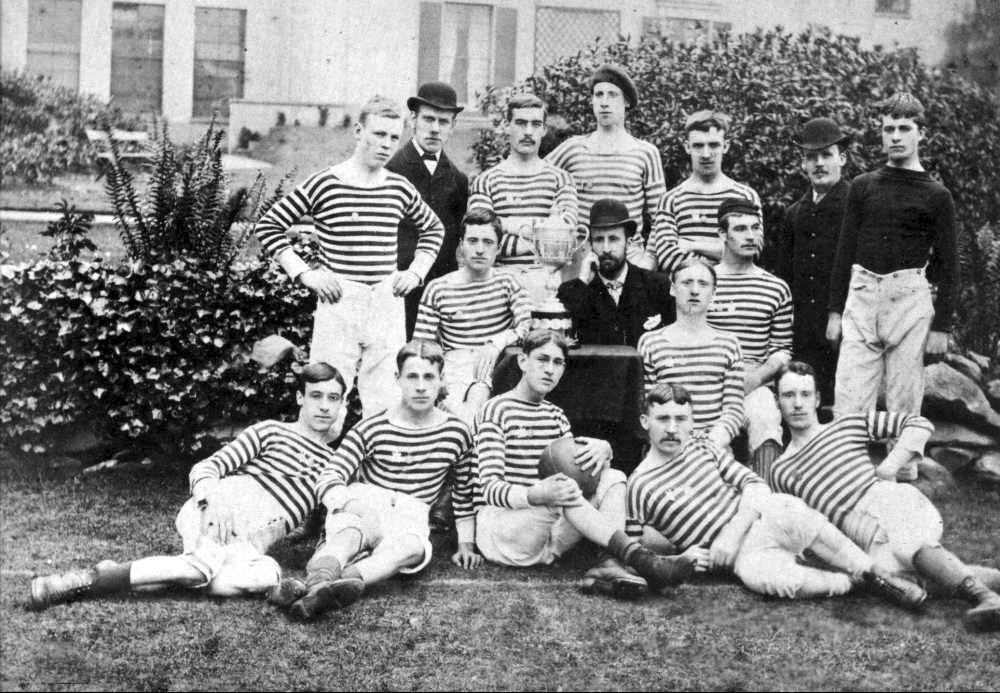
The Albion team display the Staffordshire Cup in 1883. This was the first ever photograph taken of an Albion team.

For the first two seasons of their existence, Albion played local sides on parks pitches throughout West Bromwich, Smethwick and Wednesbury, occasionally travelling as far afield as Stourbridge to get a game. The real breakthrough came at the start of the 1881–82 season, when they decided to pay a subscription to join the Birmingham & District Football Association, thus becoming eligible for their first competition, the Birmingham Senior Cup. It was their run to the quarter-finals of that tournament – beating, as they did, established sides such as Elwells FC (from Wednesbury) and Calthorpe (Edgbaston) – that made their name in the Birmingham press. Suddenly, the local papers began to take notice of the club, and began reporting on their games.

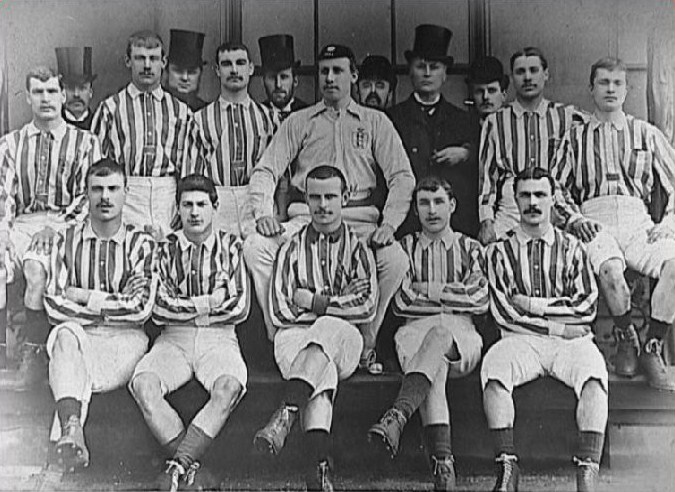
The West Bromwich Albion team of 1888, FA Cup winners and Football League founder members

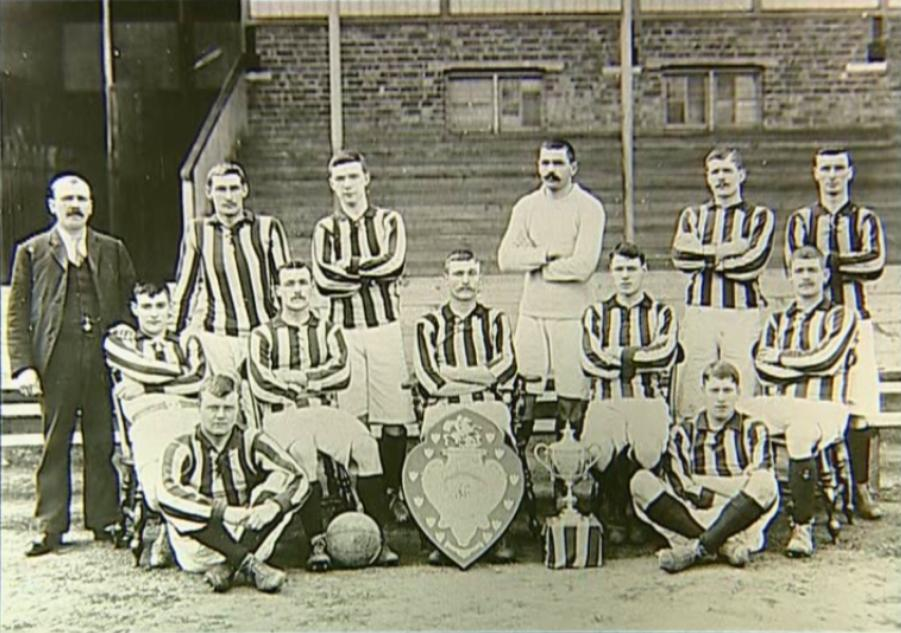
Division Two winners, 1901–02

By 1882 they had also joined the Staffordshire FA, and after another good run in the Birmingham Cup, they won the Staffordshire Cup – their first trophy – by beating Stoke 3–2 at the Victoria Ground. That was the catalyst for national success. At that time, every county had its own cup competition, and the various cup holders were welcome visitors all around the country; so it was that Albion began to arrange choice fixtures against the likes of Preston North End, Bolton Wanderers, Blackburn Rovers, and Wrexham.

They also moved ground. They had spent a season in their own enclosure, The Birches, but the drainage there was poor and so the club rented Four Acres from their former rivals, West Bromwich FC, where they would remain for three years. The conditions of the lease allowed them to play home games on Saturdays and Mondays only, but not in the summer as the ground was used then by the Dartmouth Cricket Club.

They also entered the FA Cup for the first time in the 1883–84 season. In 1885 the club turned professional, and in 1886 reached the FA Cup final for the first time, losing 2–0 to Blackburn Rovers. In 1887 they reached the final again, but lost 2–0 to Aston Villa. In 1888 they went one better and won the trophy for the first time, beating strong favourites Preston North End 2–1 in the final. Of all the clubs that went on to join the Football League, only Blackburn Rovers and Aston Villa had also won the FA Cup previously, and were the two clubs that had beaten Albion in their first two finals.

In March 1888, William McGregor wrote to what he considered to be the top five English teams, including Albion, informing them of his intention to form an association of clubs that would play each other home and away each season. Thus when the Football League started later that year, Albion became one of the twelve founder members. Albion's first ever league match was played on 8 September 1888 against Stoke, which resulted in a 2–0 away win. Albion eventually finished in 6th place in the inaugural Football League table, and reached the FA Cup semi-final that season. Having finished one place higher the following season, in the 1890/91 season they slumped and finished bottom of the table, having to apply for re-election to the Football League while again reaching the FA Cup semi-final, losing 3–2 to the eventual winners Blackburn Rovers.

Albion's second FA Cup success came in 1892, beating Aston Villa 3–0. They met Villa again in the 1895 final, but lost 1–0. The team suffered relegation to Division Two in 1900–01, their first season at The Hawthorns, but were promoted as champions the following season, when Chippy Simmons was the leading goalscorer in Division Two.

== 1902–1948 ==
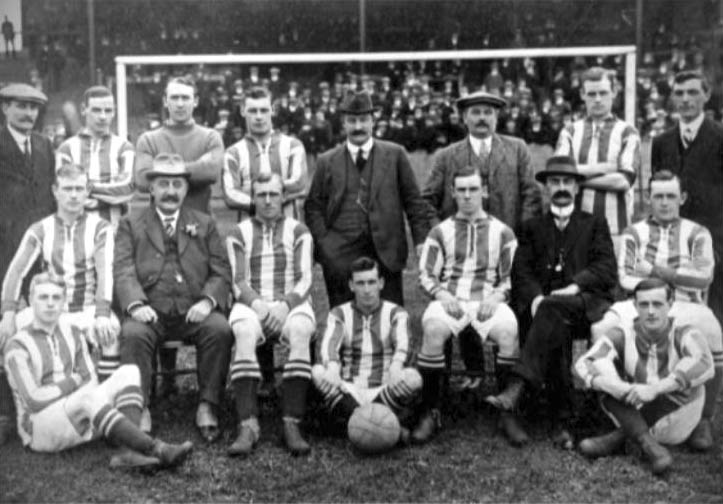
Albion were FA Cup runners-up in 1912

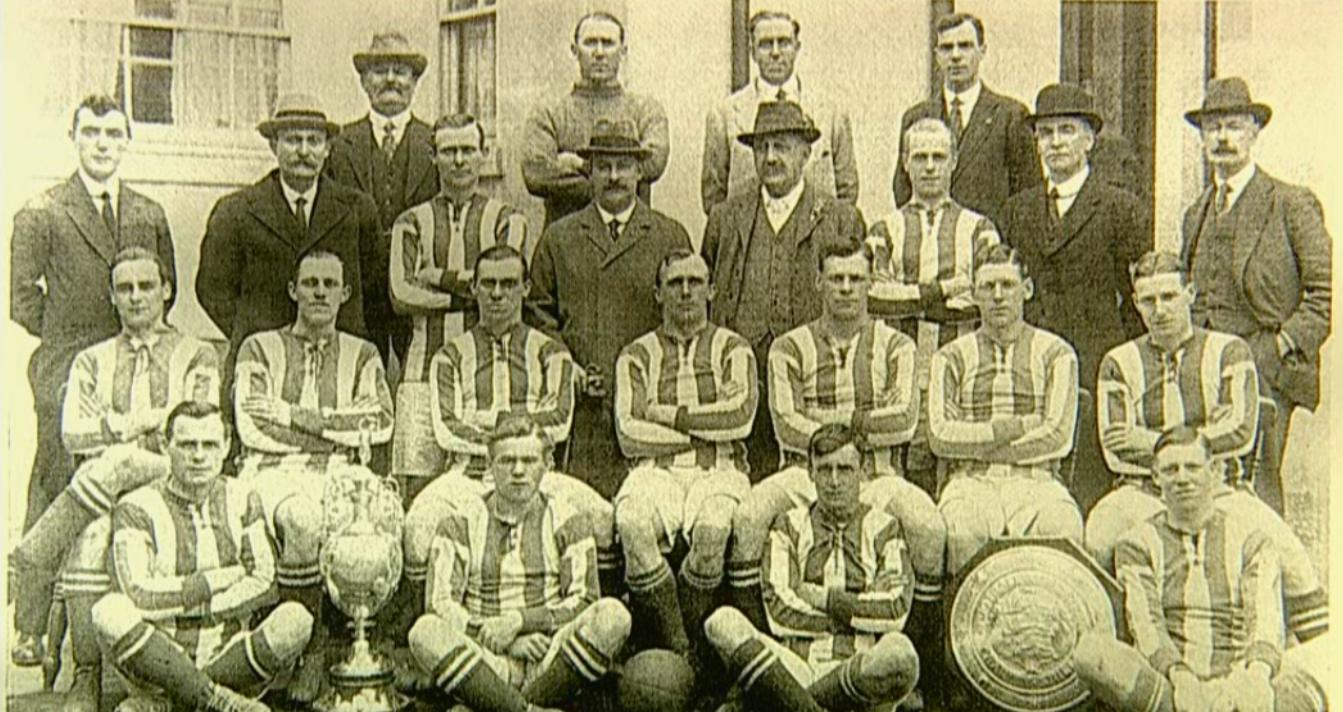
In 1919–1920 the club won the League Championship for the only time in their history.

Albion secretary Frank Heaven resigned in May 1902, and was replaced by 19-year-old Fred Everiss, who remained in the post of secretary-manager for 46 years. The team performed well on their return to Division One, topping the league for a large part of the season, but their title hopes were ended by a run of 11 games without a win—including eight straight defeats—and they finished seventh. Disagreements in the boardroom in the summer of 1903 led to the resignation of three directors, including chairman Harry Keys. Albion won just seven league games in 1903–04, and were again relegated as the First Division's bottom club. This time there was no quick return as the club finished tenth in Division Two, three points clear of having to apply for re-election. The 1905–06 season saw a marked improvement, with a 16-match unbeaten run between October and January helping the team to a 4th-place finish. In 1906–07, Fred Shinton finished as top scorer in Division Two, with 28 league goals.

They won the Division Two championship once more in 1910–11, and the following season reached another FA Cup Final, where they were defeated by Second Division Barnsley in a replay. The war-time diaspora of a promising young team did not stop individuals from playing football in charity matches, amateur teams and regional leagues. Albion won the Football League title in 1919–20 for the only time in their history following the end of the First World War, their totals of 104 goals and 60 points both breaking the previous league records. Fred Morris was the league's top goalscorer, finding the net 37 times. The team finished as Division One runners-up in 1924–25, narrowly losing out to Huddersfield Town. The same season and then-record crowd of 64,612 turned out to see Albion take on arch-rivals Aston Villa in the cup. The success wasn't sustained however, and the club were relegated in 1926–27. The following season, Jimmy Cookson scored 38 league goals to finish as Division Two's top scorer.

Albion scored a club record 105 league goals in 1929–30, but could only finish sixth in Division Two. In 1930–31 they won promotion to Division One. Only the goal-scoring exploits of Dixie Dean of Everton deprived Albion of the Second Division championship. In the same season they also won the FA Cup, beating local rivals Birmingham 2–1 in the final. The "Double" of winning the FA Cup and promotion has not been achieved before or since. Albion reached the final again in 1935, losing to Sheffield Wednesday. In 1935–1936 prolific striker W. G. Richardson scored 39 league goals, still a club record. Albion reached the FA Cup semi-final in 1937, beating Arsenal 3–1 in the quarter-final in front of a record 64,815 fans. However, they lost 4–1 to Preston North End, although the Albion players were clearly affected by the death of chairman and former player Billy Bassett two days before the game. The following season, 1937–38, Albion were relegated to Division Two. With the 1939–40 season only a few games old, the Second World War broke out and football was suspended. Once normal league competition was resumed in 1946 (the 1945–46 season had been organised on a regional basis) Albion remained in the Second Division.

== 1948–1973 ==
The turning point arrived with the retirement of Fred Everiss in 1948. Unlike most other contemporary clubs, Albion had yet to implement the modern role of coach or manager. Everiss, who was the club's administrative secretary, delivered the pre-match talk; the board of directors, which had replaced the old Club Committee, selected the team. Kicking a football played no part in training, which was for fitness alone. Albion's first modern manager was Jack Smith, who led the team to promotion in 1948–49. There followed the club's longest unbroken spell in the top flight of English football, a total of 24 years.

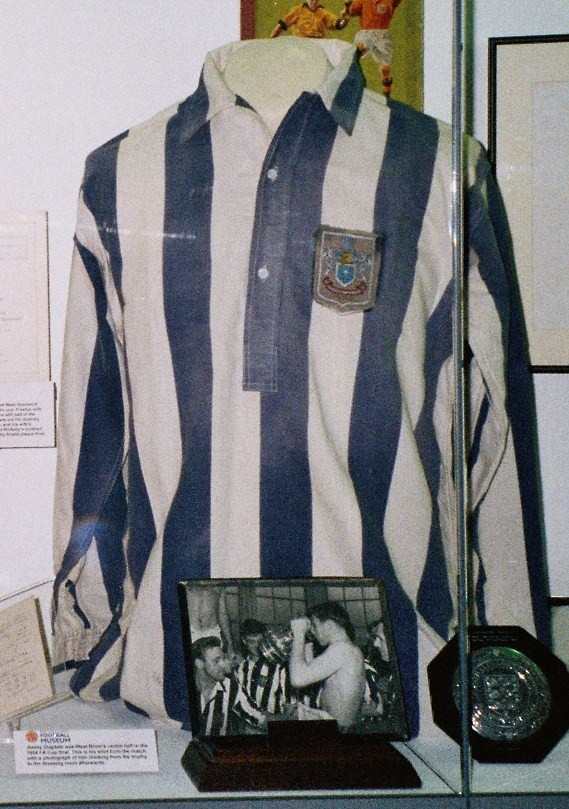
Memorabilia from the 1954 FA Cup Final

A talented new squad started to develop, marked by the arrival of Ronnie Allen in 1950, scoring against Wolverhampton Wanderers F.C. on his home debut in front of a crowd of 60,945. However, the board were frustrated by the lack of trophies and Smith was dismissed in 1952. Radically, Smith was replaced by Juventus coach Jesse Carver who introduced football into training. Though Carver was soon to be seduced back to Italy by Lazio, (although domestic household pressures were a paramount factor) his eight months in charge were a defining moment for the club. His replacement, Vic Buckingham, recruited from the amateur leagues, inherited an intelligent, well-co-ordinated team, playing a flowing style of attacking football that he was to build upon.

In 1953–54 Albion had their most successful ever season, coming agonisingly close to being the first team in the 20th century to win the League and Cup double. They topped the league for most of the season but a loss of form towards the end of the season meant that they finished as runners-up to fierce rivals Wolves in the league. Albion did however win the FA Cup, beating Preston North End 3–2 in the final. After beating Chelsea and Rotherham they faced Newcastle United in Round 5, winning 3–2 in front of 61,088 fans crammed into the Hawthorns – over 20,000 more were locked out. Spurs were beaten in the quarter-final and then Albion edged past Staffordshire rivals Port Vale at Villa Park in the semi-finals. Albion had become known for their brand of fluent, attacking football, with the 1953–54 side being hailed as "The Team of the Century". One national newspaper went so far as to suggest that the team be chosen en masse to represent England at the 1954 World Cup finals. Later in 1954 Albion played in 'Le Soir Festival de Football', losing 5–3 to Hungarian side Honved in Brussels. Ronnie Allen was the leading Division One goalscorer for 1954–55, scoring 27 league goals. However, in the next few years some disappointing league positions followed. In 1957 Albion reached the cup semi-finals but lost out to arch-rivals Aston Villa. That year they also became the first British professional team to win a game in the Soviet Union, at that time firmly under the Iron Curtain. They played three games, drawing against FC Zenit in Leningrad (Russia) and beating Dynamo Tbilisi (Georgia) and the Soviet Army side, CSKA Moscow (Russia). The Soviets were invited back to England in October and Albion beat the Soviet Central Army 6–5 in front of 53,805 fans. The 1950s also saw the arrival of players Don Howe, Derek Kevan and Bobby Robson. In the season 1957–58, Allen, Kevan and Robson scored 78 goals between them. Despite never matching their achievements of 1953–54, Albion remained one of the top English sides for the remainder of the decade, achieving three consecutive top five finishes in Division One between 1957–58 and 1959–60. Following Buckingham's departure to Ajax in 1959 the club saw another decline, although Derek Kevan's 33 league goals in 1961–62 saw him finish as joint-top goalscorer in the First Division, alongside Ray Crawford of Ipswich. Jimmy Hagan was recruited to arrest Albion's slide in 1963. His uncompromising approach led to a players' strike during the harsh winter of December 1963, after he refused to let players train wearing tracksuits.

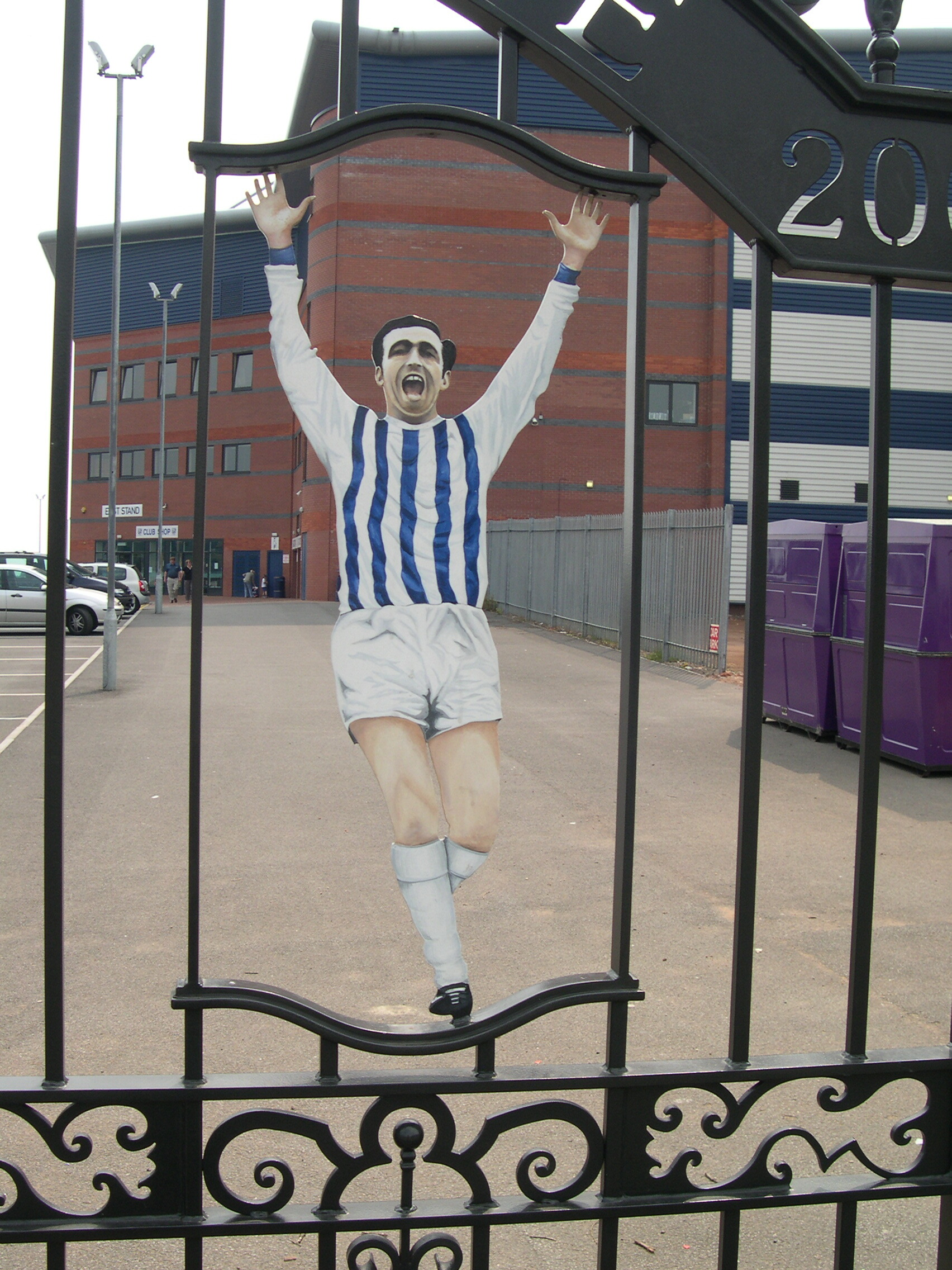
The Jeff Astle gates at The Hawthorns

In September 1964 a young striker named Jeff Astle was signed from Notts County. The club was already feeling the effects of the dramatic social changes of the 1960s, in the form of falling attendances and the end of the players' maximum wage. Hagan, despite the spirit of the times, was a martinet on the training ground and frequently bred conflict with a playing squad that was beginning to enjoy the new economic and social freedoms. However, he shrewdly built the team in personnel and skill, leading them to a League Cup triumph in 1966 as Albion (in their first League Cup appearance) beat West Ham 5–3 on aggregate in the last two-legged final. During this time the club's attack was built around the strike duo of Astle and club-record goalscorer Tony Brown, with Bobby Hope prompting from midfield and Clive Clark on the wing.

The following season, Albion lost in the final of the League Cup to Third Division Queens Park Rangers (losing 3–2 after being 2–0 up at half-time), making an early exit from their first European campaign and struggling to maintain their place in the First Division. Had Hagan had more friends at the Hawthorns, he might have been given time to fix the problems but, in 1967, he was replaced by Alan Ashman. Ashman led Albion to their fifth FA Cup victory in 1968, Astle, now known to fans as 'The King' becoming the first player to score in every round of the competition. After beating Colchester, Southampton, Portsmouth and Liverpool in the earlier rounds, Albion then knocked out rivals Birmingham City 2–0 at Villa Park. They then defeated favourited Everton 1–0 in the final, thanks to an extra-time Astle goal. Albion also defeated the newly crowned European Champions Manchester United 6–3 at the Hawthorns in front of an estimated 55,000 fans. In 1969 Albion again reached the FA Cup semi-finals but narrowly lost out to Leicester City. The following year the club reached the League Cup final again but lost out to Manchester City 2–1. In the same season, Jeff Astle became the first man to score in both an FA Cup and League Cup final. He also finished as the First Division's leading scorer, an achievement matched by his teammate Tony Brown in 1970–71.

Former Albion player Don Howe replaced Ashman as manager in 1971. Howe had just coached Arsenal to the League and Cup double and was regarded as one of the game's foremost theoreticians, but he was unable to prevent Albion's relegation to the Second Division in 1973.

== 1973–1986 ==
Failure to achieve promotion back the following season and the departure of Astle in 1974 seemed to presage a gloomy future, and cost Howe his job. In his place, the club were able to secure the services of player-manager Johnny Giles. Giles was an instant hit and Albion clinched promotion at Oldham on the final day of the 1976 season in front of an army of more than 15,000 fans. However, he then dropped a bombshell on the club by submitting his resignation in order to give more attention to his other job, manager of the Irish national team. The board was able to persuade Giles to stay on for another year however, and he led them to a comfortable finish back in the First Division, after which the club reluctantly let him go. After being turned down by Lincoln manager Graham Taylor, the club appointed Ronnie Allen as Giles' successor. Allen led the club to a brilliant start to the season, but following a row over both transfer funds and his own pay packet, accepted an offer to manage in Saudi Arabia and left after only five months.

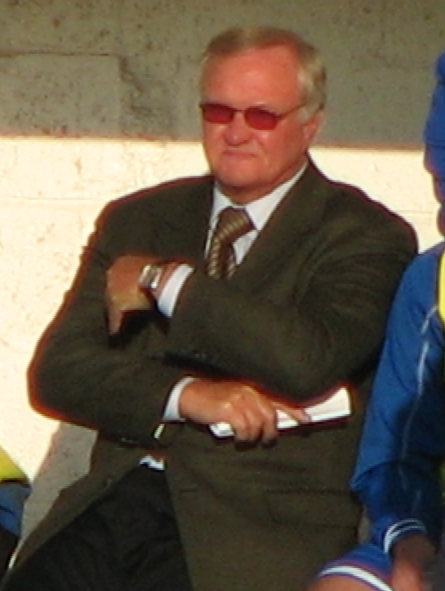
Ron Atkinson managed Albion during two separate spells in the 1970s and 1980s.

When a relatively unknown young manager named Ron Atkinson arrived at the club in 1978, he inherited a team that already included youth-team graduate Bryan Robson and Derek Statham, Ally Robertson as well as the black pair of Laurie Cunningham and Cyrille Regis, both acquired inexpensively from lower divisions. Aware that he had the makings of a great team, Atkinson augmented it by bringing Brendan Batson from his former club Cambridge United F.C. Never before had an English team simultaneously fielded three black players, and the Three Degrees, as they became known (in reference to the contemporary vocal trio of the same name), challenged the established racism of English football. Their success in the Albion side marked a watershed that allowed a generation of footballers to enter the game who would previously have been excluded by their ethnic background. Albion reached the 1978 FA Cup semi-final but lost to Ipswich Town.

In May 1978, Albion became the first British professional team to play in China. Their three-week tour, comprising four matches, was covered by the BBC TV documentary Albion in the Orient. The team challenged for the Division One title in 1978–79 but a huge pile up of fixtures and an end of season slump meant that Albion slipped to third, losing the title to Liverpool. It was nevertheless their highest league finish for more than 20 years. Albion also reached the UEFA Cup quarter-final, where they were defeated narrowly by Red Star Belgrade. Albion's 5–3 victory away at Manchester United in December 1978 was the last time, to date, that an away team scored five goals at Old Trafford. Other victories that season included a 2–0 win over Valencia and a 7–1 win against Coventry.

Atkinson's team played some of the most exciting football in England during his term at the club but, as early as 1979, the board allowed the playing talent to start slipping away; Cunningham's move to Real Madrid (for a record fee) marked the start of the trend. The club managed 3rd and 4th places in the First Division, and twice reached the semi-finals of the FA Cup, but trophies continued to elude them. In 1979, the club signed Peter Barnes and Gary Owen from Manchester City.

Following the death of director Tom Silk in a plane crash, the club fell again under the conservative leadership of Bert Millichip. Atkinson, despairing of the support he needed to build and maintain a winning team, took the vacant manager's post at Manchester United F.C. in the summer of 1981.

The surprise choice to replace Atkinson was Ronnie Allen, returning for a second spell in charge. When Atkinson made a bid to take two of the club's prize assets, Bryan Robson and Remi Moses, to his new club for a combined fee of £2.5million, the board immediately encouraged Allen to sell. Their replacements were Romeo Zondervan, Martin Jol and Andy King; for a while things looked rosy, as Albion reached the semi-finals of both domestic cups. At the time, although the record has now been surpassed by Manchester United, Arsenal, Everton & Liverpool, Albion had reached the semi-finals more times than any other club. But the usual post-Christmas slump left the side needing to win its final home game, against Leeds United, to stay up; the game was won 2–0, and Leeds were relegated instead. The game was unfortunately marred by hooliganism.

At the end of the season, Allen was 'kicked upstairs' and Coventry City coach Ron Wylie took over. He halted the slide, for a while, but resigned in 1984 after falling out with his head coach, Mick Kelly, and his players. A trio of high-profile names was recruited to take over: Johnny Giles, Norman Hunter and Nobby Stiles, and hopes were high; but their first game in charge—at home to Third Division Plymouth Argyle, in the FA Cup—resulted in defeat. "The A Team", as the management trio were known, reversed the sinking trend in the 1983–84 season and things improved the following year.

Albion's financial difficulties however forced Giles to sell players to lighten the wage bill, beginning with Cyrille Regis, and the replacements were generally inadequate. By October 1985 it was looking grim; Giles resigned, and his assistant (also his brother-in-law), Nobby Stiles, reluctantly took up the reins. Stiles lasted only a few months before being replaced by Ron Saunders. By this time, Albion were bottom of the table, and were eventually relegated with the worst record in the club's history.

== 1986–2000 ==
The Albion directors kept faith in Saunders after their relegation and he tried to put the club back on track by building a new team. But these changes did little to halt the rapid decline at the Hawthorns and he was sacked after they finished in the bottom half of the Second Division in 1987.

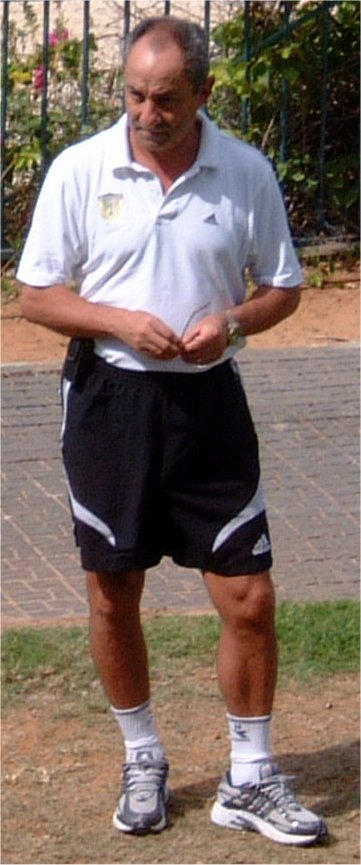
Ossie Ardiles led Albion to promotion in 1992–93.

Atkinson returned to Albion in the autumn of 1987 and they emerged as promotion contenders in 1988-89. But Atkinson was lured away to Atlético Madrid in November 1988 and midfielder Brian Talbot, 35, took over as player-manager. Talbot's reign started well and Albion were still looking well placed for promotion with three months of the season remaining, but their form slumped during the final quarter of the campaign and they missed ou on the playoffs. 1989–90 brought even more frustration as Albion finished 20th in the Second Division – their lowest final position ever at that stage. The Albion board finally lost patience with Talbot in January 1991 after they lost 4–2 at home to non-league Woking in the Third Round of the FA Cup. He was replaced by Bobby Gould, who was unable to prevent Albion from being relegated to the Third Division for the first time in their history.

Albion just missed out on the Third Division playoffs in 1992, and shortly afterwards Bobby Gould resigned. His successor was Ossie Ardiles. Ardiles was in charge at Albion for only one season, before being lured away by Tottenham, but he guided them to promotion: a 3–2 aggregate win over Swansea City in the playoff semi-final set Albion up for their first appearance at Wembley for over twenty years (and their last ever at the original stadium), when they beat Port Vale 3–0, in front of 43,000 of their own fans. Bob Taylor's 30 league goals made him the top scorer in Division Two.

Ardiles then left to manage Tottenham Hotspur, and his assistant Keith Burkinshaw took over. Albion survived relegation back to Division Two at the end of 1993–94, but only because they had scored more goals than rivals, Birmingham City. Safety was assured on the final day thanks to a 1–0 win over Portsmouth – Lee Aschcroft's goal sending the 10,000 strong army of fans in raptures. Burkinshaw sacked the following autumn, and replaced by Alan Buckley. Albion's form under Buckley was consistently below average, but just enough to avoid relegation. In October 1995 they were second in Division One and hopeful of automatic promotion, but then came a 14-match winless run. By the end of January, they looked set to be relegated to Division Two, but a big improvement in form afterwards saw them climb to mid table. Later during the season, the club signed Richard Sneekes from Bolton, who helped the club to avoid relegation.

Buckley was sacked in January 1997 and replaced by Ray Harford, who led Albion to Division One safety in 1996–97, and in the first few months of the following season the side established itself in the top six. Harford then stunned Albion by moving to QPR after less than a year in charge, making way for Denis Smith, who struggled to maintain the momentum created by Harford, and Albion could only finish 10th. In 1998–99, striker Lee Hughes scored 31 times in the league to finish as top goalscorer in all four English divisions, but Albion finished only 12th and Smith was sacked in the summer of 1999. His successor Brian Little failed to make any progress at The Hawthorns and was sacked in March 2000, with Albion in real danger of relegation.

== 2000–2010 ==
Gary Megson was named as the new West Bromwich Albion manager in March 2000, and his arrival at the club heralded a revival of Albion's fortunes. Megson quickly signed several new players as the transfer deadline approached, including veteran striker Bob Taylor, who returned for his second spell at the club. A 2–0 win over champions Charlton Athletic on the last day of the season meant that Albion remained in Division One while rivals Walsall were relegated. Megson's rejuvenation of the side continued in 2000–01, as Albion finished sixth, their highest league finish since relegation in 1986. They qualified for the Division One promotion playoffs, where they faced Bolton Wanderers in the semi-finals. The first leg finished 2–2 after Albion had led 2–0. Bolton won the second leg 3–0 to reach the final 5–2 on aggregate.

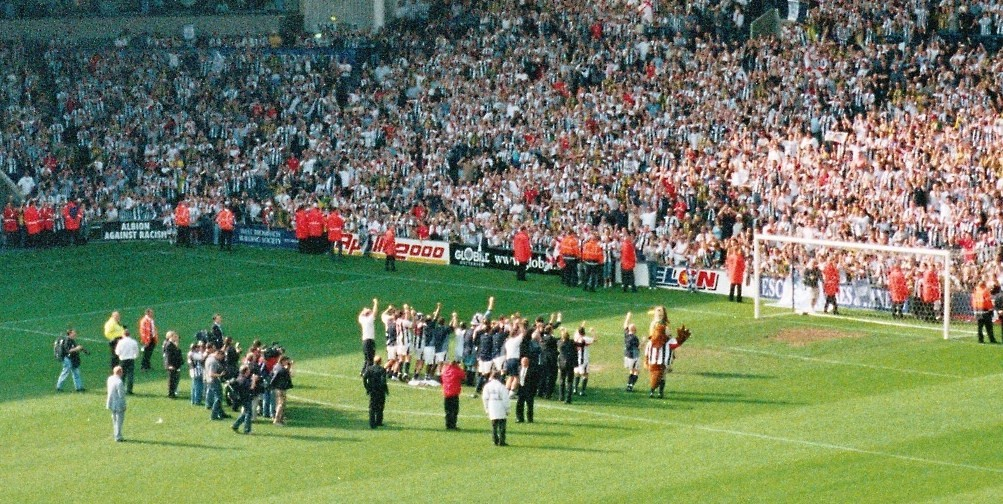
Albion celebrate promotion to the Premiership in 2004.

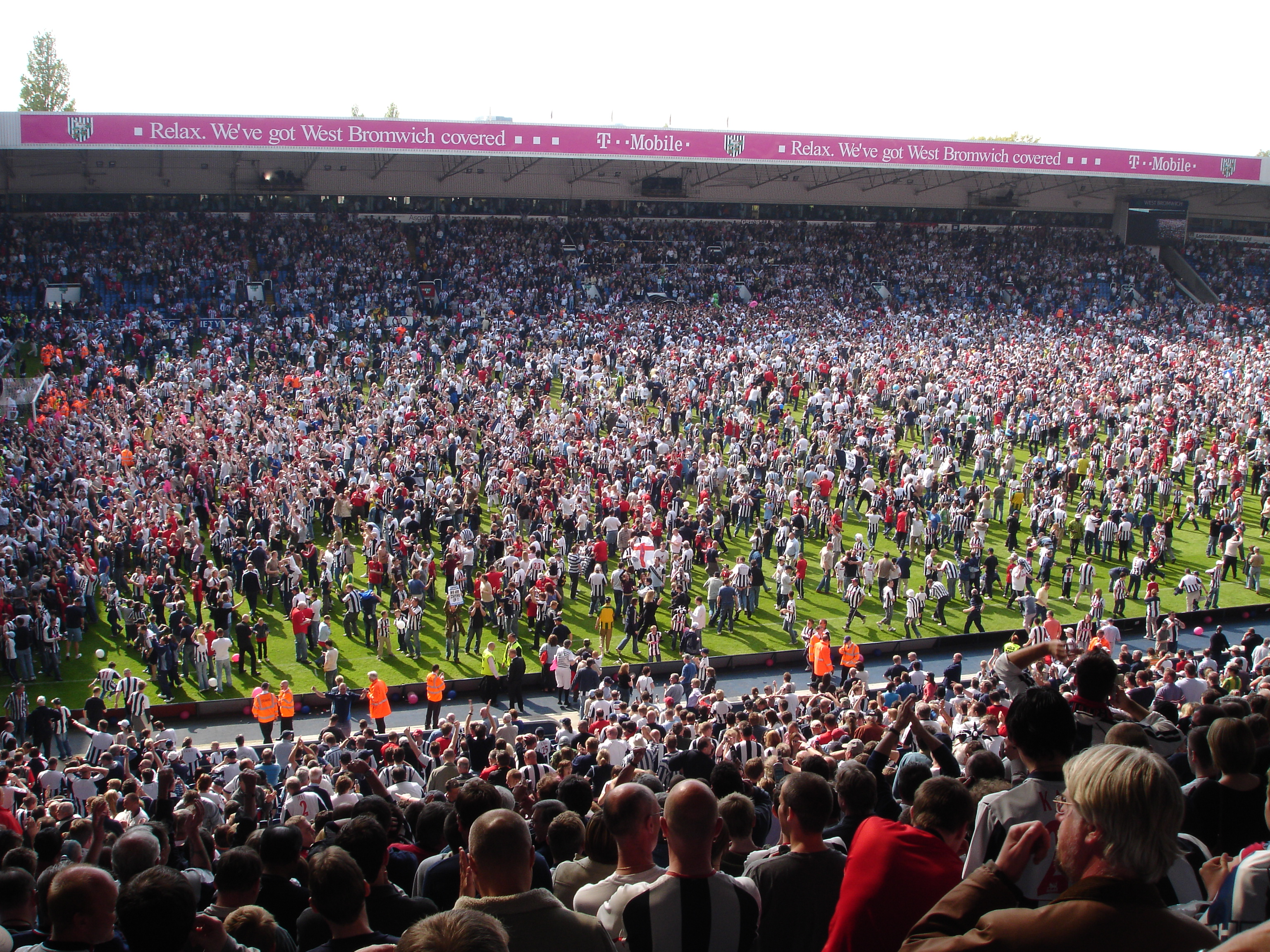
Fans invade the pitch following the 2005 escape from relegation.

In 2001–02 Albion reached the FA Cup quarter-finals, their best run in the competition for 20 years, eliminating Premiership sides Sunderland and Leicester City along the way. In the league meanwhile, the team were 11 points behind neighbours Wolves in the Division One table with eight matches left to play. Albion won seven and drew one of their remaining fixtures, including the notorious Battle of Bramall Lane, to overtake their rivals. Automatic promotion – as runners-up to Manchester City – was secured on the final day of the season in a 2–0 home win against Crystal Palace. Chairman Paul Thompson left the club several days later, following disagreements with manager Megson, and was succeeded by Jeremy Peace. Albion won just six games in their first Premiership campaign and were relegated.

In the 2003–04 season Albion had their best League Cup run for 22 years, beating Newcastle United and Manchester United before losing to Arsenal in the quarter-finals. In the league the team remained in the top two from mid-October until the end of the season, winning promotion back to the Premiership, again as runners-up, at the first attempt. The club won just one of their first 11 games of 2004–05, and Gary Megson was sacked in October after announcing that he would not be renewing his contract when it expired at the end of the season. He was succeeded the following month by legendary former Albion midfielder Bryan Robson, but the team failed to win a game under the new manager until January 2005. Results improved over the remainder of the season and with one game to play Albion were bottom of the Premiership, but only two points below Norwich City who were 17th. On the last day of the season, Albion beat Portsmouth 2–0, while Crystal Palace, Norwich and Southampton all failed to achieve the results they needed. Albion therefore became the first team in the history of the Premiership to avoid relegation after being bottom at Christmas, although their total of 34 points was the lowest by any team to avoid relegation from the Premiership.

Albion failed to avoid the drop in the 2005–06 season, despite home wins over Everton, Arsenal and Spurs. They were relegated to The Championship following Portsmouth's 2–1 victory over Wigan Athletic. Robson left the club "by mutual consent" in September 2006 and by was replaced the following month by Tony Mowbray. In Mowbray's first game in charge, The Baggies beat Wolves 3–0, their biggest win over their rivals for over 25 years. Albion briefly led the Championship on goal difference in February, but indifferent form over the remainder of the season meant that automatic promotion was out of reach. A 7–0 victory over Barnsley on the final day of the league season secured a place in the play-offs, where they met Wolves again in the semi-finals. Albion won the first leg 3–2 at Molineux, while in the second leg at The Hawthorns Albion won again, 1–0. This booked them a place in the final at Wembley Stadium against Derby County, but Albion lost 1–0.

In 2007–08 West Brom reached the FA Cup semi-finals for the first time since 1982, but lost 1–0 to Portsmouth at Wembley Stadium. The crowd of 83,584 was the highest ever for an FA Cup semi-final. A month later they won a third promotion to the Premier League by winning the Football League Championship. However, the next year they were relegated again and Tony Mowbray left to manage Celtic. Roberto Di Matteo was appointed as the new manager and after a successful season Albion were yet again promoted to Premier League.

== 2010–present ==
Roberto Di Matteo led the club back to the Premier League at the first attempt, but was dismissed in February 2011 and replaced by Roy Hodgson. Hodgson guided Albion to an 11th-place finish in 2010–11. May 2012 saw Hodgson, having led West Brom to a 10th-place finish in the 2011–12 season, leave to become the manager of the England national team. Steve Clarke then led Albion to an eighth-place finish in 2012–13, their highest in the Premier League, but was sacked halfway through the following season and replaced by Pepe Mel, who left by mutual consent at the end of the campaign. After the brief tenure of Alan Irvine, Tony Pulis was appointed head coach on 1 January 2015. On 5 August 2016, it was announced the club had been sold to a Chinese investment group headed up by Guochuan Lai, and John Williams replaced Peace as chairman. Pulis was sacked due to poor results in November 2017, and was replaced by Alan Pardew later that month. after just one win in 18 league matches, Pardew left by mutual consent in April 2018. Despite a good run of form under caretaker manager Darren Moore, during which time he won the Manager of the Month award for April 2018, West Brom were relegated after eight seasons in the Premier League.

Following relegation, on 18 May 2018 Moore was confirmed as the manager of the club on a three-year contract, tasked with the job of leading the team back to the Premier League. However, on 9 March 2019 he was sacked despite the team lying 4th in the table. The sacking was met with significant criticism from the media, with Peter Crouch describing the sacking as "ridiculous and needless". Albion finished 4th in their first season back in the Championship, qualifying for the Championship play-offs, under caretaker manager James Shan. However the team lost in the playoff semi-final to Aston Villa.

Slaven Bilić took over as manager in June 2019, and led Albion to automatic promotion back to the Premier League during the 2019–20 season. Back in the Premier League, Bilić was controversially sacked on 16 December 2020, with Sam Allardyce named as his replacement the same day. After Albion were relegated from the Premier League at the end of the 2020–21 season, Allardyce resigned from his position. The club endured disappointing results back in the Championship during the tenures of Valérien Ismaël and Steve Bruce, who left the club in the relegation places in the 2022–23 season. Carlos Corberán was named as successor on 25 October 2022. He guided Albion to a 5th-place finish and the play-off semi-finals at the end of the 2023–24 season, and the club maintained a play-off position for much of the following season. Corberán left the club on Christmas Eve 2024 to join Valencia, and was replaced as permanent manager by Tony Mowbray in January 2025, but he lasted just three months, after Albion's promotion push dwindled to an eventual 9th place finish.

Ryan Mason was appointed head coach ahead of the 2025–26 season, but won just a third of his games in charge before being fired in January 2026. His successor, Eric Ramsay, lasted just nine games, with no wins, before leaving in February 2026; James Morrison took over on an interim basis for the rest of the season. On 13 April 2026, it was reported that the club could face a points deduction, dropping it into the relegation places, for an alleged breach of the EFL's profit and sustainability rules.
