= Brian Whitehouse =

English footballer

Personal information
- Date of birth: 8 September 1935
- Place of birth: West Bromwich, England
- Date of death: 16 January 2017 (aged 81)
- Position: Forward

Youth career
- West Bromwich Albion

Senior career*
Years	Team	Apps	(Gls)
1955–1960	West Bromwich Albion	37	(13)
1960–1962	Norwich City	41	(14)
1962–1963	Wrexham	45	(19)
1963–1966	Crystal Palace	82	(17)
1966	Charlton	13	(1)
1966–1968	Leyton Orient	52	(6)
Total		270	(70)

Managerial career
- 1975: West Bromwich Albion (caretaker)
- * Club domestic league appearances and goals

Brian Whitehouse (8 September 1935 – 16 January 2017) was an English professional footballer who played as a forward for West Bromwich Albion, Norwich City, Wrexham, Crystal Palace, Charlton and Leyton Orient. He was top scorer for Palace in the 1965–1966 season with seven goals. After his retirement from playing in 1968, he undertook various coaching and scouting positions, and was briefly caretaker manager at West Bromwich Albion in 1975; he died in 2017, aged 81. Whitehouse's debut came on 14 April 1956 at Portsmouth's Fratton Park as injury to Johnny Nicholls gave manager Vic Buckingham a chance to assess him across the final three games of the season.

Sporting positions
Preceded by Don Howe	West Bromwich Albion manager April 1975 (caretaker)	Succeeded by Johnny Giles
