= Ronnie Allen =

English football player and manager (1929–2001)

Personal information
- Full name: Ronald Allen
- Date of birth: 15 January 1929
- Place of birth: Fenton, Stoke-on-Trent, Staffordshire, England
- Date of death: 9 June 2001 (aged 72)
- Place of death: Great Wyrley, Staffordshire, England
- Height: 5 ft 8 in (1.73 m)
- Positions: Outside forward; centre-forward

Youth career
- 1941–1944: Northwood Mission
- 1944–1946: Port Vale

Senior career*
| Years | Team | Apps | (Gls) |
| 1946–1950 | Port Vale | 123 | (34) |
| 1950–1961 | West Bromwich Albion | 415 | (208) |
| 1961–1965 | Crystal Palace | 100 | (34) |
| Total | | 638 | (276) |

International career
| 1952–1954 | England | 5 | (2) |
| 1954 | England B | 2 | (0) |
| | Football League | 1 | (0) |

Managerial career
- 1965–1968: Wolverhampton Wanderers
- 1967: → Los Angeles Wolves (USA)
- 1969–1971: Athletic Bilbao
- 1972: Sporting CP
- 1973: Walsall
- 1977: West Bromwich Albion
- 1977–1978: Saudi Arabia
- 1980: Panathinaikos
- 1981–1982: West Bromwich Albion
- * Club domestic league appearances and goals

Ronald Allen (15 January 1929 – 9 June 2001) was an English international football player and manager. He was a professional footballer for 19 years, between 1946 and 1964, making 638 appearances in the Football League and scoring 276 goals. He also won five caps for the England national team. He later became a manager at clubs in England, Spain, Portugal, and Greece. His son, Russell, also played professional football throughout the 1970s.

Starting his career in 1946 with Port Vale, he spent four years with the club before making a record-breaking transfer to West Bromwich Albion. He was one of the best strikers of the 1950s, playing over 400 games, with a ratio of a goal every two games. He lifted the FA Cup in 1954, and helped the club to the FA Charity Shield in 1954, and a second-place finish in the First Division in 1953–54. In 1961 he signed with Crystal Palace, where he spent the final four years of his playing career. He helped Palace win promotion out of the Third Division in 1963–64.

His management career began in 1965 with Wolverhampton Wanderers, as he led Wolves out of the Second Division in 1966–67. In 1969, he took up the reins at Spanish club Athletic Bilbao, leading the club to a second-place finish in La Liga in 1969–70. In 1972, he was appointed manager of Portuguese club Sporting Lisbon; after one season with the club, he moved back to England to manage Walsall for a brief period. In 1977, he spent a short time as manager of West Bromwich Albion. After a spell advising the Saudi Arabia national team, he took charge of Greek club Panathinaikos for a short time in 1980. His last management position was back at West Brom in 1981–82, following which he served the club as a coach and scout.

== Club career ==
=== Youth teams ===
Ronald Allen was born on 15 January 1929 in Fenton, Stoke-on-Trent, Staffordshire. He attended Hanley High School. Despite playing for the school rugby team, his preferred sport was football. He turned out for his local Boys' Brigade team and, later, Wellington Scouts. He then moved on to Northwood Mission, where he played at outside-right, alongside Bill McGarry and Basil Hayward, who would later become his teammates at Port Vale. Allen scored 57 goals for the Mission in the 1943–44 season.

=== Port Vale ===
Allen signed amateur forms with Port Vale in December 1944 at the age of 15. He made his full debut on 2 April 1945 in a 2–2 draw against Wrexham in the Football League North, playing at outside-right and laying on one of Vale's goals. At this point in his life he was a mere 4 feet 10 inches (1.47 m) and weighed under 8 stone (50 kg). He scored his first goal for the club in a 4–3 win against Norwich City in August 1945, and in March 1946 signed as a part-time professional, for which he received a £10 signing-on fee. The 1946–47 season was the first full season of competitive football in England following the end of the Second World War; Allen made his Football League debut on 7 September 1946 in a 2–1 defeat to Exeter City. Due to his national service commitments, he only made 18 appearances during that season, scoring five goals. He was the club's top scorer in the 1947–48 season with 13 goals.

Allen joined the Royal Air Force early in 1947 and represented their football team several times. He was demobbed on 1 June 1949. In total, he played 156 games for the club (including wartime appearances), scoring 40 goals.

=== West Bromwich Albion ===
"For three seasons at least, Ronnie Allen was, in my mind, the best centre-forward in the country... There is no doubt that between 1952 and 1955 he was right on top of his game."

— Ray Barlow

Allen was transferred to West Bromwich Albion on 2 March 1950 for £20,000, a club record fee for both clubs at the time. This was more than double the previous Albion record, set when Jackie Vernon was brought to the club three years earlier. Allen scored on his debut two days later to secure a 1–1 draw against Wolverhampton Wanderers in a First Division match. The attendance of 60,945 remains a record for a league game at The Hawthorns. Though only 5 feet 8 inches (1.73 m) and barely 11 stone (70 kg), he emerged as a talented striker, helping to define the modern role of target man. Signed by Jack Smith, he was soon converted from a wide player into a centre-forward. Allen also benefited from the ultra-modern training techniques of Jesse Carver, who served Albion as manager for a brief time in the 1952–53 campaign. Carver's successor, Vic Buckingham, also had a Total Football philosophy and appreciated the technical skill Allen possessed, allowing him to play as a deep-lying attacker with room to dribble at will – a revolutionary position and tactic.

Davy Walsh, the club's top-scorer since the war, was sold to Aston Villa in December 1950 for a £25,000 fee. Allen managed to fill the attacking void and formed a deadly partnership with Johnny Nicholls, feeding poacher Nicholls many of the 58 league goals he scored between 1951 and 1957. Allen became the club's top-scorer for three successive seasons, hitting ten goals in 1950–51, 32 goals in 1951–52, and twenty goals in 1952–53. His run was interrupted by Nicholls, who became the top-scorer in 1953–54, as the club recorded a second-place finish in the league. During the campaign, Allen scored against former club Port Vale in the FA Cup semi-final and then scored twice against Preston North End in the 1954 final, which Albion won 3–2. He then scored a hat-trick in the 1954 FA Charity Shield at Molineux, ensuring a 4–4 draw with league champions and Black Country rivals Wolverhampton Wanderers. He was First Division top scorer in 1954–55 with 27 goals, though the "Baggies" struggled in the league, finishing a disappointing 17th.

He became the club's top-scorer for a fifth and final time in 1955–56, hitting the net 17 times. Allen's transfer record was broken in March 1956, when the club paid Fulham £25,000 for Bobby Robson. The club reached the FA Cup semi-finals again in 1956–57, only to lose out to eventual winners Aston Villa, following a replay. Albion managed to improve their league form in 1957–58, finishing fourth, as Robson and Derek Kevan's strike partnership replaced that of Allen's and Nicholls'. Though Nicholls departed, Allen remained a key member of the first-team, as West Brom finished fifth in 1958–59; he further enhanced his legendary status at Albion by scoring the equaliser late in the game against Aston Villa to send Albion's biggest rivals down. New manager Gordon Clark led West Brom to a fourth-place finish in 1959–60, which was followed by a tenth-place finish in 1960–61.

He scored a total of 234 goals in 458 appearances for West Brom, making him the second-highest scorer in the club's history, behind Tony Brown. This record also makes him eighth in the club's all-time appearance charts.

=== Crystal Palace ===
Allen was sold to Crystal Palace for a £4,500 fee in May 1961. Under Arthur Rowe's stewardship, the "Glaziers" finished 1961–62 15th in the Third Division. Dick Graham then took the reins for the rest of Allen's time at Selhurst Park, as the club struggled in mid-table in 1962–63, only to win promotion as runners-up in 1963–64. Although his appearances in 1963–64 were restricted by injury (to 27), he was officially captain of the side that season. After scoring a Second Division goal in 1964–65, he became the only player to score a Football League goal in the first twenty consecutive seasons of post-war football. He left Crystal Palace in March 1965 at 36, having scored 34 goals in 100 league games for the club.

== International career ==
Allen made his England debut at the age of 23, in a 3–0 friendly win against Switzerland in Zürich on 28 May 1952. He had to wait almost two years for his second cap, which came against Scotland on 3 April 1954, the same day that his club West Bromwich Albion were playing rivals Wolverhampton Wanderers in a vital First Division match. Allen scored with a header in the second half to help England beat the Scots 4–2 in the match at Hampden Park, and also had another headed goal disallowed. He also appeared against Yugoslavia, and was included in England's initial squad for the 1954 FIFA World Cup, but did not make the final travelling party. He nevertheless earned two further caps, the first of which was a 3–2 win against Wales in a British Home Championship game, and the last of which was against West Germany on 1 December 1954. Allen scored from 6 yards (5.5 m) out in a 3–1 Wembley win against the World champions. He was again overlooked in the selection for the 1958 FIFA World Cup. He was seen to be too far ahead of his time. On his lack of England caps, Allen himself said, "No two people see the game the same way and everyone is entitled to his own judgement". Albion teammate Frank Griffin stated that "There was too much emphasis put on height for England strikers. They all had to be like Lawton and be over 6ft. He should have played for England more, there was no doubting Allen's sheer skill. That should have been enough."

In addition to scoring two goals in five full internationals, he also appeared twice for the England B team; both matches took place in 1954. He also scored twice for England B when they beat a Sheffield XI 5–4 in October 1957. However, this match is not included in the England B records compiled by RSSSF. Allen travelled with England to the 1958 and 1982 World Cups as the team's official interpreter.

== Style of play ==
Allen was a skilful and intelligent forward player who used his speed rather than his physique to get the better of opposition defenders. He was an accomplished passer of the ball, able to make pinpoint through passes at both short and long range. He had fantastic vision on the ball, and could play with both feet. He also had a powerful shot, was an accomplished penalty taker, and could volley the ball with ease. The official West Brom website describes Allen as "the complete footballer", and compares him to the Hungarian legend Ferenc Puskás.

== Managerial career ==
In March 1965, Allen joined Wolverhampton Wanderers as senior coach, working under manager Andy Beattie. Following Beattie's departure, Allen replaced him as manager in September 1965, just after their relegation to the Second Division. He signed quality players, bringing names such as Derek Dougan and Mike Bailey to Molineux. He guided them to promotion in 1966–67, and Wolves consolidated their top-flight status in 1967–68. However, he was sacked in November 1968, and replaced by former Port Vale teammate Bill McGarry.

Allen took up the post of manager at Spanish club Athletic Bilbao in the summer of 1969, replacing Rafael Iriondo. He led Athletic to the runners-up spot in La Liga in 1969–70, as they finished one point behind Atlético Madrid. In 1970–71 the Lions finished fifth, eight points behind champions Valencia CF. He remained at the club until November 1971, leaving shortly after being eliminated from the UEFA Cup by Eintracht Braunschweig.

He was appointed manager at Portuguese side Sporting CP for the 1972–73 campaign. He was sacked before the end of the season due to a poor showing in the Primeira Liga – the club ended up in fifth place, equalling their worst-ever finish, despite the goalscoring form of Héctor Yazalde. Champions S.L. Benfica won 28 of their 30 league games. Despite their league form, new manager Mário Lino did lead Sporting to their ninth Taça de Portugal success after defeating Vitória 3–2 at the Estádio Nacional.

He returned to the Midlands to take up the management reins at Walsall in July 1973. However, he spent just six months in charge at Fellows Park. The "Sadders" finished the 1973–74 campaign 15th in the Third Division. He returned to West Bromwich Albion as a scouting advisor in January 1977 before being installed as manager six months later. He recommended the club sign Cyrille Regis, who would become the club's main striker for the next seven years and part of the "Three Degrees" with Brendon Batson and Laurie Cunningham. He stepped down in December, to take up the financially lucrative post as advisor to the Saudi Arabia national football team. He returned to management in June 1980, this time at Greek club Panathinaikos. Again he enjoyed only a short reign, and was gone within six months. In his absence, the "Greens" finished fifth in the Super League Greece.

He returned to the Hawthorns as manager again in July 1981, succeeding Ron Atkinson – who had just moved to Manchester United. Two of Albion's finest players, Remi Moses and Bryan Robson, soon joined Atkinson at Old Trafford, and this hurt Albion's previously good league fortunes. He signed Steve MacKenzie, Andy King, Martin Jol, and Romeo Zondervan; none of whom would prove particularly effective. Albion did well in the cup competitions, reaching the semi-finals of both the FA Cup and the League Cup, although they suffered an early exit from the UEFA Cup. But Allen could not put together a good run of form in the First Division, and Albion only stayed up after winning their final game of the season. He then ended his managerial career in May 1982, choosing instead to work as the club's general manager. He stepped down from this post in June 1983, though he continued to coach and scout for the club during his retirement until 1996. He even played in a testimonial match at Cheltenham in 1995, at the age of 66.

== Personal life and legacy ==
His autobiography, It's Goals That Count, with a foreword by Vic Buckingham, was published in 1955. He had a son, Russell Allen, who started his career at West Brom, before playing close to 300 league games at Tranmere Rovers and Mansfield Town between 1971 and 1981.

Ronnie Allen died suffering with Alzheimer's disease on 9 June 2001 in Hardwick Court Nursing Home, Great Wyrley, Staffordshire. West Bromwich Albion's pre-season friendly against Athletic Bilbao later that summer was designated as the "Ronnie Allen Memorial Match", in recognition of his contribution to both clubs. A minute's silence was held before kick-off and proceeds from the match donated to the Alzheimer's Society, a disease he had been diagnosed with in later life. Allen had himself played and scored the only goal for West Brom in a testimonial match for Athletic's long serving player Agustín Gaínza in 1958, and while managing the Spanish side in 1971 he had arranged two friendlies between the clubs for the benefit of Bobby Hope and José Ángel Iribar.

In 2004 Allen was named as one of West Bromwich Albion's 16 greatest players, in a poll organised as part of the club's 125th anniversary celebrations.

== Career statistics ==
=== Club ===
Appearances and goals by club, season and competition
| Club | Season | League | | | FA Cup | | Other | | Total | |
| Club | Season | Division | Apps | Goals | Apps | Goals | Apps | Goals | Apps | Goals |
|---|---|---|---|---|---|---|---|---|---|---|
| Port Vale | 1945–46 | | 0 | 0 | 6 | 2 | 0 | 0 | 6 | 2 |
| Port Vale | 1946–47 | Third Division South | 18 | 5 | 0 | 0 | — | | 18 | 5 |
| Port Vale | 1947–48 | Third Division South | 38 | 13 | 1 | 0 | — | | 39 | 13 |
| Port Vale | 1948–49 | Third Division South | 40 | 10 | 1 | 0 | — | | 41 | 10 |
| Port Vale | 1949–50 | Third Division South | 27 | 6 | 4 | 2 | — | | 31 | 8 |
| Port Vale | Total | | 123 | 34 | 12 | 4 | 0 | 0 | 135 | 38 |
| West Bromwich Albion | 1949–50 | First Division | 11 | 5 | 0 | 0 | 0 | 0 | 11 | 5 |
| West Bromwich Albion | 1950–51 | First Division | 40 | 10 | 2 | 0 | 0 | 0 | 42 | 10 |
| West Bromwich Albion | 1951–52 | First Division | 40 | 32 | 2 | 3 | 0 | 0 | 42 | 36 |
| West Bromwich Albion | 1952–53 | First Division | 41 | 20 | 5 | 1 | 0 | 0 | 46 | 21 |
| West Bromwich Albion | 1953–54 | First Division | 39 | 27 | 6 | 7 | 0 | 0 | 45 | 34 |
| West Bromwich Albion | 1954–55 | First Division | 42 | 27 | 2 | 0 | 1 | 3 | 45 | 30 |
| West Bromwich Albion | 1955–56 | First Division | 34 | 17 | 3 | 1 | 0 | 0 | 37 | 18 |
| West Bromwich Albion | 1956–57 | First Division | 37 | 10 | 9 | 5 | 0 | 0 | 46 | 15 |
| West Bromwich Albion | 1957–58 | First Division | 39 | 22 | 6 | 6 | 0 | 0 | 45 | 28 |
| West Bromwich Albion | 1958–59 | First Division | 36 | 17 | 3 | 0 | 0 | 0 | 39 | 17 |
| West Bromwich Albion | 1959–60 | First Division | 36 | 15 | 3 | 0 | 0 | 0 | 39 | 15 |
| West Bromwich Albion | 1960–61 | First Division | 20 | 6 | 1 | 0 | 0 | 0 | 21 | 6 |
| West Bromwich Albion | Total | | 415 | 208 | 42 | 23 | 1 | 3 | 458 | 234 |
| Crystal Palace | 1961–62 | Third Division | 28 | 13 | 2 | 0 | 1 | 0 | 31 | 13 |
| Crystal Palace | 1962–63 | Third Division | 36 | 11 | 3 | 1 | 1 | 0 | 40 | 12 |
| Crystal Palace | 1963–64 | Third Division | 27 | 7 | 2 | 2 | 0 | 0 | 29 | 9 |
| Crystal Palace | 1964–65 | Second Division | 9 | 3 | 0 | 0 | 0 | 0 | 9 | 3 |
| Crystal Palace | Total | | 100 | 34 | 7 | 3 | 2 | 0 | 109 | 37 |
| Career total | | | 638 | 276 | 61 | 30 | 3 | 3 | 702 | 309 |

=== International ===
Appearances and goals by national team and year
| National team | Year | Apps | Goals |
|---|---|---|---|
| England | 1952 | 1 | 0 |
| England | 1953 | 0 | 0 |
| England | 1954 | 4 | 2 |
| Total | | 5 | 2 |

Scores and results list England's goal tally first, score column indicates score after each Allen goal.

List of international goals scored by Ronnie Allen
| No. | Date | Venue | Opponent | Score | Result | Competition | Ref. |
|---|---|---|---|---|---|---|---|
| 1 | 3 April 1954 | Hampden Park, Glasgow, Scotland | Scotland | 3–1 | 4–2 | 1954 FIFA World Cup qualification | |
| 2 | 1 December 1954 | Wembley Stadium, London, England | West Germany | 2–0 | 3–1 | Friendly | |

=== Managerial ===
Managerial record by team and tenure
| Team | From | To | Record | | | | |
| Team | From | To | P | W | D | L | Win % |
|---|---|---|---|---|---|---|---|
| Wolverhampton Wanderers | 19 September 1965 | 17 November 1968 | 150 | 66 | 35 | 49 | 44.0 |
| Los Angeles Wolves | May 1967 | 15 July 1967 | 13 | 6 | 5 | 2 | 46.2 |
| Athletic Bilbao | September 1969 | November 1971 | 88 | 40 | 21 | 27 | 45.5 |
| Walsall | 6 July 1973 | 20 December 1973 | 26 | 6 | 9 | 11 | 23.1 |
| West Bromwich Albion | 21 June 1977 | 22 December 1977 | 22 | 11 | 7 | 4 | 50.0 |
| West Bromwich Albion | 1 July 1981 | 31 May 1982 | 58 | 19 | 15 | 24 | 32.8 |
| Total | | | 357 | 148 | 92 | 117 | 41.5 |

== Honours ==
West Bromwich Albion

- FA Cup: 1953–54
- FA Charity Shield: 1954 (shared)

Crystal Palace

- Football League Third Division second-place promotion: 1963–64

Wolverhampton Wanderers

- Football League Second Division second-place promotion: 1966–67

Los Angeles Wolves

- United Soccer Association: 1967

England

- British Home Championship: 1953–54, 1954–55
