= George Lee (footballer) =

English footballer and coach

Personal information
- Full name: George Lee
- Date of birth: 4 June 1919
- Place of birth: York, England
- Date of death: 1 April 1991 (aged 71)
- Place of death: Norwich, England
- Height: 5 ft 8 in (1.73 m)
- Position: Outside left

Senior career*
Years	Team	Apps	(Gls)
1936–1947	York City	37	(11)
1947–1949	Nottingham Forest	76	(20)
1949–1958	West Bromwich Albion	271	(59)

International career
1946	British Forces	10	(6)
- * Club domestic league appearances and goals

George Lee (4 June 1919 – 1 April 1991) was an English footballer who played left wing for York City, Nottingham Forest and West Bromwich Albion. After retiring from playing he became coach at West Bromwich Albion and later Norwich City.

== Biography ==
Lee was born in York and attended Knavesmire School. As a teenager he represented York City Schools, Yorkshire County Boys and Acomb F.C., before a trial at Tottenham Hotspur and a brief spell at Scarborough. He signed for his first senior team York City in 1936. He put pen to paper on the stroke of midnight on his seventeenth birthday, seventeen being the youngest age that a player could sign a professional contract at the time. His career at York City blossomed during the war when he was York's leading scorer for four consecutive seasons. In April 1943 Lee became the first player to score 100 goals for York City, reaching the milestone with a converted penalty in a World War II match against Sheffield Wednesday. In 1946, after serving his country in World War II, Lee was selected to play for England in the European Championships, scoring six goals in 10 appearances.

=== Nottingham Forest ===
He signed for Nottingham Forest in 1947 for a fee of £7,500 and scored in his debut on 23 August 1947 at home to Bury as Forest won 2–1. He also scored in his last match for the club, also against Bury, on 7 May 1949 in a 1–0 victory. He finished as Forest's top scorer in the 1948–49 season with 10 goals as Forest were relegated to the Third division South.

=== West Bromwich Albion ===
He moved for £12,000 move to West Bromwich Albion in 1949. He made his debut for Albion in a 1–0 win against Charlton Athletic on 20 August 1949, the opening day of the 1949–50 season, and scored his first goal for the club in a 2–1 defeat away to Liverpool on 18 February 1950. He became a regular in the no. 11 shirt in his first seven seasons at the club. Lee played in the 1954 FA Cup Final, setting up Ronnie Allen for the opening goal and picking up a winner's medal as the Baggies beat Preston North End 3–2. After scoring 65 goals in 295 appearances for Albion, Lee joined non-league Lockheed Leamington on a free transfer in June 1958, before a short period at Vauxhall Motors.

After retiring as a player, Lee returned to West Bromwich Albion as a coach/trainer in 1959. He became a coach at Norwich City in 1963, serving the East Anglia club until 1987. Lee died in Norwich in 1991 at the age of 71.

== Career statistics ==
Appearances and goals by club, season and competition
Club	Season	League		Cup		Other (Note: Includes appearances in the Wartime League.)		Total	
Club	Season	Apps	Goals	Apps	Goals	Apps	Goals	Apps	Goals
York City	1936–37	2	0	0	0	0	0	2	0
York City	1937–38	4	3	0	0	0	0	4	3
York City	1938–39	30	8	1	0	0	0	31	8
York City	1939–40	0	0	0	0	23	13	23	13
York City	1940–41	0	0	0	0	28	16	28	16
York City	1941–42	0	0	0	0	31	26	31	26
York City	1942–43	0	0	0	0	35	26	35	26
York City	1943–44	0	0	0	0	31	9	31	9
York City	1944–45	0	0	0	0	3	0	3	0
York City	1945–46	0	0	1	1	2	0	3	1
York City	1946–47	1	0	0	0	0	0	1	0
York City	Total	37	11	2	1	153	90	192	102
Nottingham Forest.	1947–48	41	10	1	0	0	0	42	10
Nottingham Forest.	1948–49	35	10	2	0	0	0	37	10
Nottingham Forest.	Total	76	20	3	0	0	0	79	20
West Bromwich Albion	1949–50	25	2	0	0	0	0	25	2
West Bromwich Albion	1950–51	31	2	2	1	0	0	33	3
West Bromwich Albion	1951–52	39	10	3	2	0	0	42	12
West Bromwich Albion	1952–53	41	10	5	1	0	0	46	11
West Bromwich Albion	1953–54	41	7	6	0	0	0	47	7
West Bromwich Albion	1954–55	37	13	2	0	1	0	40	13
West Bromwich Albion	1955–56	40	10	3	2	0	0	43	12
West Bromwich Albion	1956–57	9	2	2	0	0	0	11	2
West Bromwich Albion	1957–58	8	3	0	0	0	0	8	3
West Bromwich Albion	Total	271	59	23	6	1	0	295	65
Career total		384	90	25	7	154	90	564	187

== Honours ==
West Bromwich Albion

- FA Cup: 1953–54
