= Ray Barlow =

English footballer (1926–2012)

Personal information
- Full name: Raymond John Barlow
- Date of birth: 17 August 1926
- Place of birth: Swindon, Wiltshire, England
- Date of death: 14 March 2012 (aged 85)
- Place of death: Bridgend, Wales
- Position: Left half

Senior career*
Years	Team	Apps	(Gls)
1944–1960	West Bromwich Albion	403	(31)
1960–1961	Birmingham City	5	(0)
1961	Stourbridge		

International career
1954	England	1	(0)
- * Club domestic league appearances and goals

Raymond John Barlow (17 August 1926 – 14 March 2012) was an England international footballer who made more than 400 appearances in the Football League, most of which were for West Bromwich Albion.

== Playing career ==
=== West Bromwich Albion ===
Barlow joined West Bromwich Albion in 1944 and helped them to promotion to the First Division in 1948–49. The team would remain in the top flight for the rest of Barlow's playing career with the club.

Under the management of Vic Buckingham, he was part of the 1954 FA Cup winning team. In the final West Bromwich Albion beat Preston North End 3–2. This team came close to accomplishing a League and Cup double that year, but finished runners-up in the League behind Wolverhampton by four points.

Barlow remained a regular in midfield until 1960, by which time players like Derek Kevan, Bobby Robson and Dave Burnside were all playing.

=== Birmingham City ===
Barlow joined Albion's neighbours Birmingham City in 1960. He ended his playing career with non-League Stourbridge in 1961 after only a handful of appearances for the Blues.

=== International career ===
Barlow won just one cap for England, in a Home Championship match against Northern Ireland on 2 October 1954 which England won 2–0. This was an experimental England side which contained seven debutants. Johnny Haynes, who also made his debut in that match was the only player who would become an England regular. Besides this, Barlow had two outings for England B and four for the Football League XI, and an FA tour of South America.

== After retirement ==
After retirement, Barlow went on to run a tobacconist's and sweet shop in West Bromwich and then a post office in Stourbridge.

== Legacy ==
In 2004 Barlow was named as one of West Bromwich Albion's 16 greatest players, in a poll organised as part of the club's 125th anniversary celebrations. He was described by Bobby Robson as one of the best players he had played alongside. In his autobiography Bobby Moore said that he modelled his game on Barlow.

Barlow was the last surviving member of the team that won the FA Cup in 1954 against Preston North End. He died on 14 March 2012, aged 85, after a long illness. The flags at The Hawthorns were lowered to half-mast on the day of Barlow's funeral, and a minute's applause was held at The Hawthorns before West Brom's game against Newcastle United on 25 March.

== Honours ==
West Bromwich Albion

- FA Cup: 1953–54
