= James Dudley (disambiguation) =

James Dudley (1910–2004) was an American baseball player and professional wrestling personality.

James or Jimmy Dudley may also refer to:

- James B. Dudley (1859–1925), American university president
- Jimmy Dudley (1909–1999), American sportscaster
- Jimmy Dudley (footballer) (1928–2006), Scottish footballer

== See also ==
- James B. Dudley High School, school in North Carolina, USA
