= Jimmy Baxter (footballer, born 1925) =

Scottish footballer

Personal information
- Full name: James Cunningham Baxter
- Date of birth: 8 November 1925
- Place of birth: Dunfermline, Scotland
- Date of death: May 1994 (aged 68)
- Place of death: Barnsley, England
- Position: Inside forward

Senior career*
| Years | Team | Apps | (Gls) |
| 1943–1946 | Dunfermline Athletic | ? | (?) |
| 1946–1952 | Barnsley | 222 | (54) |
| 1952–1959 | Preston North End | 245 | (65) |
| 1959–1960 | Barnsley | 26 | (3) |
| 1961–1962 | Morecambe | 3 | (1) |
- * Club domestic league appearances and goals

James Cunningham Baxter (8 November 1925 – May 1994) was a Scottish footballer who played for Dunfermline Athletic, Barnsley, Preston North End, and Morecambe. He scored more than 100 Football League goals and was part of the Preston North End team in the 1954 FA Cup Final.

During World War II he was conscripted to work in a coal mine as one of the Bevin Boys. He signed for Preston in July 1952 for £12,000 and made his debut in October in a 1–0 win over Tottenham Hotspur. He scored his first goal for Preston three weeks later as their fifth goal in a 5–2 victory at Portsmouth. By the time he appeared in the 1954 FA Cup Final, he had suffered multiple injuries during his career, including a broken jaw, toe, left hand and two ribs. His last game for Preston was in April 1954 and in May he returned to Barnsley. He later signed for Morecambe, managed by former Preston teammate Joe Dunn.

== Honours ==
Preston North End

- FA Cup runner-up: 1953–54
