= Joe Kennedy (footballer) =

English footballer (1925–1986)

Personal information
- Full name: Joseph Peter Kennedy
- Date of birth: 15 November 1925
- Place of birth: Cleator Moor, Cumberland, England
- Date of death: 17 September 1986 (aged 60)
- Place of death: West Bromwich, England
- Position: Centre half

Senior career*
Years	Team	Apps	(Gls)
1941	Cleator Moor Celtic		
1942	Workington		
1944–1945	Gravesend		
1945	Freelands FC		
1948–1949	Altrincham	1	(0)
1948–1961	West Bromwich Albion	364	(35)
1961–1962	Chester	35	(0)
1962	Stourbridge		
Total		400	(3)
- * Club domestic league appearances and goals

Joseph Peter Kennedy (15 November 1925 – 17 September 1986) was an English professional footballer who played at centre half for the majority of his career, virtually all of which was spent at West Bromwich Albion.

== Career ==
=== Club career ===
Born in Cleator Moor, Cumberland, Kennedy represented St. Patrick's School in Whitehaven, as well as Whitehaven & District Boys. He joined Cleator Moor Celtic in 1941, then Workington the following year. Kennedy had trials at Brentford and Millwall in 1943 and 1944 respectively, before moving to non-league Gravesend for the 1944–45 season. He joined Freelands F.C. in August 1945, before signing for Altrincham in April 1946. He made one appearance for the Altrincham 1st team, a 4–2 defeat to Winsford United.

Kennedy turned professional in December 1948, when he signed for West Bromwich Albion for a £750 fee. He made his debut away against Luton Town in Division Two on 9 April 1949, less than two months after his first game for the reserve team. Kennedy initially played at inside-right and then right-half, but later switched to centre-half as successor to Jack Vernon. In 1952 the Birmingham Mail claimed that Kennedy was the highest paid footballer in the country, due to him receiving maximum club wages, regular win bonuses and various representative honours.

Kennedy suffered a leg injury in 1953–54 and lost his place to Jimmy Dugdale. However, he was called upon to replace the injured right-back Stan Rickaby for the 1954 FA Cup Final against Preston North End, which Albion won 3–2. When Dugdale left to join Aston Villa, Kennedy became Albion's regular centre-half for most of the remainder of the decade.

In all he made 397 appearances for West Bromwich Albion, scoring four goals, before joining Chester on a free transfer in June 1961. He made his debut in a 1–0 home win over Oldham Athletic on 19 August 1961 but Chester finished bottom of the Football League at the end of the 1961–62 season and Kennedy retired from professional football. His 35th and final league appearance for Chester came on 1 May 1962, in a 2–0 loss at Carlisle United. He also played during the season in two league games against Accrington Stanley that were deleted from the records when Accrington resigned from the Football League during the season, leaving Kennedy stranded on 399 rather than 401 league appearances when he retired.

Kennedy joined Stourbridge as player-manager in August 1962 and later turned out for his works team, Brockhouse Works F.C. He retired from playing in 1966 at the age of 40. He continued to work at Brockhouse until the age of 60, when he collapsed and died there in September 1986.

=== International career ===
Kennedy captained the England 'B' team on three occasions and also represented the FA XI. He was a permanent reserve for the full England side during the early 1950s but never earned a cap.

== Style of play ==
In 2002 football journalist Gavin McOwan listed Kennedy at no. 17 in his list of West Bromwich Albion's 50 Greatest Players, regarding him as the best (English) Albion player never to win an England cap. McOwan says that what Kennedy lacked in pace, he made up for with tactical awareness and positioning. Albion club historian Tony Matthews meanwhile has described Kennedy as being "steady, totally reliable, consistent, superb in the air, sure and sound on the ground." Whilst at Albion, Kennedy quickly earned the nickname "Spring-heeled Joe" because of his ability to jump for high balls. He was never sent off during his career and rarely committed a foul.

== Career statistics ==
Club	Season	League		FA Cup		Charity Shield		Total
Club	Season	App	Goals	App	Goals	App	Goals	App	Goals
West Bromwich Albion	1948–49	8	1	0	0	0	0	8	1
West Bromwich Albion	1949–50	34	0	2	0	0	0	36	0
West Bromwich Albion	1950–51	35	0	2	0	0	0	37	0
West Bromwich Albion	1951–52	36	1	3	0	0	0	39	1
West Bromwich Albion	1952–53	26	0	2	0	0	0	28	0
West Bromwich Albion	1953–54	13	0	1	0	0	0	14	0
West Bromwich Albion	1954–55	32	0	0	0	1	0	33	0
West Bromwich Albion	1955–56	31	1	3	0	0	0	34	1
West Bromwich Albion	1956–57	35	0	8	0	0	0	43	0
West Bromwich Albion	1957–58	34	0	7	0	0	0	41	0
West Bromwich Albion	1958–59	10	0	0	0	0	0	10	0
West Bromwich Albion	1959–60	41	0	3	1	0	0	44	1
West Bromwich Albion	1960–61	29	0	1	0	0	0	30	0
West Bromwich Albion	Subtotal	364	3	32	1	1	0	397	4
Chester	1961–62	35	0	0	0	0	0	35	0
Chester	Subtotal	35	0	0	0	0	0	35	0
Total		399	3	32	1	1	0	432	4

Kennedy also played in one Football League Cup match for Chester.

== Honours ==
West Bromwich Albion

- FA Cup: 1953–54
