= Jimmy Sanders (footballer) =

English footballer

Personal information
- Full name: James Sanders
- Date of birth: 5 July 1920
- Place of birth: Hackney, London, England
- Date of death: 11 August 2003 (aged 83)
- Place of death: Tamworth, Staffordshire, England
- Position: Goalkeeper

Youth career
- Charlton Athletic

Senior career*
| Years | Team | Apps | (Gls) |
| 1943–1944 | Cray Wanderers | 4 | (0) |
| 1944–1945 | Charlton Athletic | | |
| 1945–1958 | West Bromwich Albion | 391 | (0) |
| 1958–? | Kettering Town | | |
| | Coventry City | 10 | (0) |
| ?–1960 | Hinckley Athletic | | |
- * Club domestic league appearances and goals

James Sanders (5 July 1920 – 11 August 2003) was an English footballer who played as a goalkeeper, most notably for West Bromwich Albion.

== Biography ==
Sanders joined Charlton Athletic from Cray Wanderers towards the end of the Second World War but found his progress hampered by both the outbreak of the war and the presence of Addicks legend Sam Bartram. His war service was spent with the Royal Air Force, for whom he was a gunner pilot before being invalided out. Deprived of playing time due to the presence of Bartram, he appeared as a guest player for Chelsea, Liverpool, Southampton and West Ham United before guesting for Albion, earning himself a £2,250 move to the Hawthorns. Sanders established himself as number one at the club until 1952 when he lost out to Norman Heath, although he continued to feature intermittently until his departure in 1958. He followed this with brief spells at Kettering Town, Coventry City and Hinckley Athletic before retiring in 1960. Following his retirement he left football to pursue a career in the pub trade, although he was distinguished by usually wearing his 1954 FA Cup final winners medal around his neck.

== Honours ==
West Bromwich Albion

- FA Cup: 1953–54
