= Norman Heath =

English footballer

Personal information
- Full name: Norman Harold Heath
- Date of birth: 31 January 1924
- Place of birth: Wolverhampton, England
- Date of death: November 1983 (aged 59)
- Place of death: Great Barr, Birmingham, England
- Position: Goalkeeper

Youth career
- 1942–1943: West Bromwich Albion (amateur)

Senior career*
Years	Team	Apps	(Gls)
1943–1955	West Bromwich Albion	121	(0)
- * Club domestic league appearances and goals

Norman Harold Heath (31 January 1924 – November 1983) was an English footballer who played as a goalkeeper for West Bromwich Albion.

== Biography ==
Heath was born in Wolverhampton and was an old player with Bushbury Hill school and hampton boys. He joined West Bromwich Albion as an amateur in May 1942 and turned professional in October 1943, having made his debut in September 1943 in the Football League North against Wolverhampton Wanderers.

His career was interrupted when he joined the British Army in 1944, initially based locally with the King's Shropshire Light Infantry before serving with the Royal Leicestershire Regiment in Pune. Obtaining the rank of Company Quartermaster Sergeant he also appeared for the Combined Services XI side a number of times.

He returned to Albion and made his full Football League debut in 1947 against Sheffield Wednesday, although it would be 1952 before Heath replaced incumbent Jimmy Sanders as the Baggies first choice keeper. However his career was cut short in 1954 when, during a league match with Sunderland he was involved in a collision with Ted Purdon, leading to severe back and neck injuries that forced his retirement from the game.

Heath, who used a wheelchair for the rest of his life, was granted a testimonial against an International XI in 1956. 55,000 well-wishers turned up. He had a spell as manager of local club Great Barr Gunners before his death in Great Barr, Birmingham in November 1983.
