= Johnny Nicholls =

English footballer

Personal information
- Full name: John Nicholls
- Date of birth: 3 April 1931
- Place of birth: Wolverhampton, Staffordshire, England
- Date of death: 1 April 1995 (aged 63)
- Place of death: West Bromwich, England
- Position: Forward

Senior career*
Years	Team	Apps	(Gls)
1951–1957	West Bromwich Albion	131	(58)
1957	Cardiff City	8	(2)
1957–1959	Exeter City	55	(23)
1959–1961	Worcester City	56	(14)
1961	Wellington Town		
1961	Oswestry Town		
1961–1962	Sankey		

International career
1954	England U23	1	(0)
1954	England	2	(1)
- * Club domestic league appearances and goals

John Nicholls (3 April 1931 – 1 April 1995), better known as Johnny Nicholls or sometimes Jack Nicholls, was an English footballer who played as a forward. During his professional career he represented West Bromwich Albion, Cardiff City and Exeter City.

== Biography ==
Nicholls was born in Wolverhampton, Staffordshire. He lived with his parents in Lawrence Avenue, Heath Town and attended Springfield Road Senior Boys' School, Springfield leaving at the age of 14. His father, Sam was an ex-boxer. Johnny's footballing career began at local club Heath Town Wesley in the Wolverhampton & District Amateur Football League. He scored 44 goals in his first season 1947–8, and came to the notice of West Bromwich Albion manager Jack Smith. He joined West Bromwich Albion as an amateur in August 1950 and helped Albion juniors win the West Bromwich League and the Handsworth League Cup, scoring four times in the final. He turned professional a year later. In the 1951–52 season Nicholls had progressed to playing for Albion reserves in the Central League. His first team debut came as replacement for the injured Ronnie Allen at Blackburn Rovers in the Football League First Division. He won a winners medal with Albion when they beat Preston North End 3–2 in the 1954 FA Cup Final, also winning two England caps in the same year. In May 1957 he joined Cardiff City for £4000, but moved on to Exeter City just six months later. Nicholls stayed with Exeter until 1959. He died in West Bromwich in 1995.

== Honours ==
West Bromwich Albion

- FA Cup: 1953–54
