= 1954 FA Cup final =

- Wembley Stadium, venue
- Event: 1953–54 FA Cup
West Bromwich Albion	Preston North End
3	2
- Date: 1 May 1954
- Venue: Wembley Stadium, London
- Referee: Arthur Luty (Leeds)
- Attendance: 100,000

The 1954 FA Cup final was a football match between West Bromwich Albion and Preston North End, played on 1 May 1954 at the original Wembley Stadium in London. It was the final match of the 1953–54 staging of English football's primary cup competition, the Football Association Challenge Cup (better known as the FA Cup). The match was the 73rd FA Cup Final and the 26th to be played at Wembley.

West Bromwich Albion were appearing in their ninth final, having won the cup on three previous occasions, while Preston had won the competition twice and were playing in the final for the sixth time. The two clubs had met in one final before in 1888, with Albion winning 2–1 on that occasion; in this match, Albion won 3–2. Ronnie Allen opened the scoring but Preston soon equalised through Angus Morrison. Preston then took the lead through Charlie Wayman. Allen equalised from the penalty spot before a late goal from Frank Griffin secured the cup for Albion for the fourth time. Albion finished second in the league table, losing out on "the double" to Black Country rivals Wolverhampton Wanderers.

The last surviving member of the winning team, Ray Barlow, died in March 2012 at the age of 85. Upon his death on 31 December 2020, Tommy Docherty was the last surviving player from the match.

== Background ==
Both clubs were members of the First Division, West Bromwich Albion having finished as runners-up during the 1953–54 league season and Preston North End 11th. Albion were victorious in both league matches between the two sides, winning 2–0 at Deepdale and 3–2 at The Hawthorns. The teams had met on six previous occasions in the FA Cup. Albion had won four of those ties, including the 1886–87 semi-final and 1888 final, while Preston were victorious in the semi-finals of 1888–89 and 1936–37.

== Route to the final ==
=== West Bromwich Albion ===
West Bromwich Albion
Round	Opposition	Score
3rd	Chelsea (h)	1–0
4th	Rotherham United (h)	4–0
5th	Newcastle United (h)	3–2
6th	Tottenham Hotspur (h)	3–0
Semi-final	Port Vale (n)	2–1

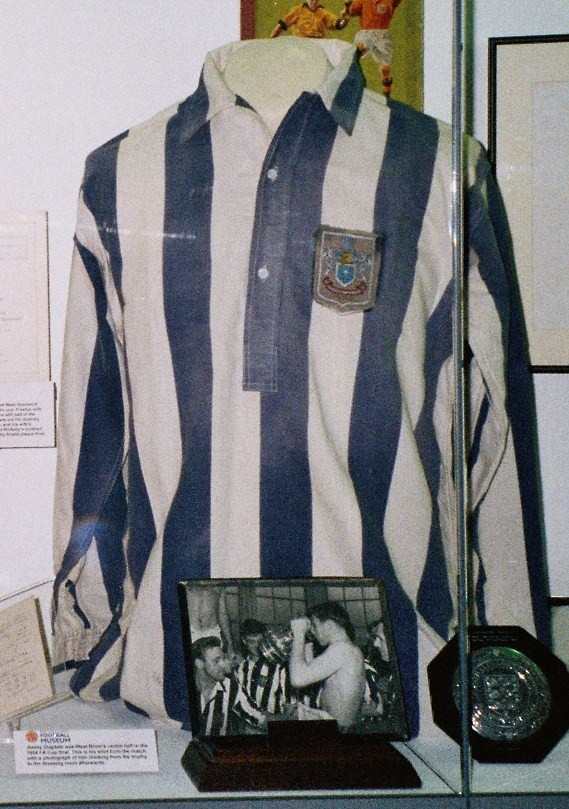
Memorabilia from the final on display at the National Football Museum in Preston

As a First Division club, West Bromwich Albion entered the FA Cup at the third round stage. They began their 61st FA Cup campaign at home against Chelsea, whom they beat 1–0 thanks to an own goal by Ron Greenwood. Their next cup match saw Albion defeat Rotherham United 4–0, in what was the first ever meeting between the two sides in any competition. Johnny Nicholls scored two of the goals and Ronnie Allen and Reg Ryan one each. A hat-trick from Ronnie Allen gave Albion a 3–2 win against Newcastle United in round five in a thrilling match. The game was played in front of 61,088 spectators, the highest attendance at The Hawthorns for 16 years. An estimated 20,000 more were locked out. Albion were then drawn at home for the fourth round in succession; this time Tottenham Hotspur were the visitors as the competition reached the quarter-final stage. A free-kick by Ray Barlow and two goals from Johnny Nicholls resulted in a 3–0 West Bromwich Albion victory.

Staffordshire rivals and Third Division North leaders Port Vale were the opposition in the semi-final, which was played at the neutral venue of Villa Park in front of a near 70,000 crowd. Vale's Albert Leake opened the scoring before the break, but Albion equalised just after the hour when Jimmy Dudley's cross evaded the Vale goalkeeper Ray King and ended up in the net. Ronnie Allen, playing against his former team, scored the winning goal for Albion from a penalty kick, following a foul on George Lee.

=== Preston North End ===
Round	Opposition	Score
3rd	Derby County (a)	0-2
4th	Lincoln City (a)	0-2
5th	Ipswich Town (h)	6-1
6th	Leicester City	1-1 (a)
6th	Leicester City	2-2 (h)
6th	Leicester City	1-3 (a)
Semi-final	Sheffield Wednesday (n)	2-0

== Match details ==
1 May 1954

West Bromwich Albion	3–2	Preston North End
Allen 21' 63' (pen.); Griffin 87'	(Report)	Morrison 22'; Wayman 51'

Wembley, London
Attendance: 100,000 approx.
Referee: Arthur Luty

West Bromwich Albion	Preston North End

GK	1	(England) Jim Sanders
RB	2	(England) Joe Kennedy
LB	3	(England) Len Millard (c)
RH	4	(Scotland) Jimmy Dudley
CH	5	(England) Jimmy Dugdale
LH	6	(England) Ray Barlow
OR	7	(England) Frank Griffin
IR	8	(Republic of Ireland) Reg Ryan
CF	9	(England) Ronnie Allen
IL	10	(England) Johnny Nicholls
OL	11	(England) George Lee
Manager:
(England) Vic Buckingham

GK	1	(England) George Thompson
RB	2	(Scotland) Willie Cunningham
LB	3	(England) Joe Walton
RH	4	(Scotland) Tommy Docherty
CH	5	(Australia) Joe Marston
LH	6	(Scotland) Willie Forbes
OR	7	(England) Tom Finney
IR	8	(England) Bobby Foster
CF	9	(England) Charlie Wayman
IL	10	(Scotland) Jimmy Baxter
OL	11	(Scotland) Angus Morrison
Manager:
(Scotland) Scot Symon
