= Joe Walton (footballer, born 1925) =

English footballer

Personal information
- Full name: Joseph Walton
- Date of birth: 5 June 1925
- Place of birth: Manchester, England
- Date of death: 31 December 2006 (aged 81)
- Place of death: Preston, England
- Position: Left back

Youth career
- 1939–1946: Manchester United

Senior career*
Years	Team	Apps	(Gls)
1946–1948	Manchester United	21	(0)
1948–1961	Preston North End	401	(4)
1961–1962	Accrington Stanley	18	(0)
1962–?	Horwich RMI		
Total		440	(4)
- * Club domestic league appearances and goals

Joseph Walton (5 June 1925 – 31 December 2006) was an English professional footballer.

He was born in Manchester in June 1925, and began his playing career at the end of the Second World War with Manchester United. As a full-back, he was unable to displace Johnny Carey or John Aston in the line-up, and was transferred to Preston North End in March 1948 in hope of gaining regular first-team football, having only played 23 games in two seasons at Old Trafford.

Walton was to remain at Deepdale for almost 13 years, during which time he played 435 competitive games, and came close to winning the Football League title and the FA Cup.

He finally left Preston in February 1961 and joined Fourth Division strugglers Accrington Stanley.

Accrington went bankrupt and were forced to resign from the Football League in March 1962, with two months of the season left to play. Their record was expunged and league football did not return to the club for 44 years. Walton was approaching 37 at the time of Accrington's demise, and decided to retire from professional football, but he continued at non-league level as player-coach of Horwich RMI.

After retiring from football later in the 1960s, he ran a newsagents shop in Preston and then worked for a local electrical firm. He died in Preston on New Year's Eve 2006 at the age of 81. He was survived by his wife and two grown-up children.

== Honours ==
Preston North End

- FA Cup runner-up: 1953–54
