= Angus Morrison (footballer) =

Scottish footballer and manager

Personal information
- Full name: Angus Cameron Morrison
- Date of birth: 26 April 1924
- Place of birth: Dingwall, Scotland
- Date of death: 18 December 2002 (aged 78)
- Place of death: Derby, England
- Position: Outside left

Senior career*
Years	Team	Apps	(Gls)
	Ross County	?	(?)
1946–1948	Derby County	52	(21)
1948–1957	Preston North End	262	(70)
1957–1958	Millwall	15	(4)
1958–1961	Nuneaton Borough	71	(12)
	Belper Town	?	(?)
Total		329	(95)

International career
1953	Scotland B	1	(1)

Managerial career
- Nuneaton Town
- Belper Town
- * Club domestic league appearances and goals

Angus Cameron Morrison (26 April 1924 – 18 December 2002) was a Scottish footballer who played as an outside left in the Football League.

Angus Morrison started his professional football career with his local Highland Football League club, Ross County F.C., who now play in the Scottish Premier League.

He moved to Derby County in October 1944, for the fee of one box of cigars. While at Derby, Morrison played 52 times and scored 21 goals.

In November 1948, Morrison moved to Preston North End. During a highly successful tenure, he made 262 appearances, scoring 70 goals, including one in the 1954 FA Cup Final, when Preston lost out to West Bromwich Albion. Sir Tom Finney said of Morrison, "He was a very, very nice fellow who was quite unassuming. He was very popular with the fans and a very good player. Angus was a big strong lad, he was about 6ft, but he was quite quick and a good goalscorer. He was a very good player to have in your side."

In 1957 Morrison transferred to Millwall, making 15 appearances and scoring 4 goals.

In his later years, he served as team manager at Nuneaton Borough and Belper Town and as a coach at Ripley Miners Welfare.

== Honours ==
Preston North End

- FA Cup runner-up: 1953–54
