= 1953–54 in English football =

Football in England
- Season: 1953–54

Men's football
- First Division: Wolverhampton Wanderers
- Second Division: Leicester City
- FA Cup: West Bromwich Albion

The 1953–54 season was the 74th season of competitive football in England.

== Overview ==
To celebrate the 90th anniversary of the Football Association, on 21 October 1953, England played a Rest of the World side picked by a FIFA Select Committee. After being 3-1 down following goals by László Kubala and Giampiero Boniperti, Alf Ramsey scored a last minute penalty to draw the game 4-4. On 25 November 1953, the Marvellous Magyars Hungary national football team, led by prolific forward Ferenc Puskás, shocked football by defeating England 6–3 at Wembley Stadium. On 25 May 1954, England lost to Hungary again, in Budapest, suffering their heaviest defeat, 7-1.

On the domestic scene, Wolverhampton Wanderers, managed by former player Stan Cullis, won the league title for the first time, while their local rivals West Bromwich Albion lifted the FA Cup for the fourth time. Albion had also finished second in the league behind Wolves, while defending champions Arsenal slipped to 12th this season. Liverpool, the first postwar champions of the English league, were relegated to the Second Division in bottom place. Everton were promoted to the First Division after three seasons in the Second Division and have not been relegated since. Twenty-one years after winning the Third Division South, Brentford are relegated to the Third Division South for the first time and do not return to the second tier until 1992. In addition to the success of Midlands teams in the top division, Port Vale won Third Division North by 11 points, going unbeaten at home and conceding a record low of 21 goals. They also became the first Third Division side since the war to reach the semi-final of the FA Cup, losing to West Bromwich Albion.

Sam Bartram of Charlton Athletic set a League record on 6 March 1954 becoming the first player with 500 League appearances.

== Honours ==
| Competition | Winner | Runner-up |
|---|---|---|
| First Division | Wolverhampton Wanderers (1) | West Bromwich Albion |
| Second Division | Leicester City | Everton |
| Third Division North | Port Vale | Barnsley |
| Third Division South | Ipswich Town | Brighton & Hove Albion |
| FA Cup | West Bromwich Albion (4) | Preston North End |
| Charity Shield | Arsenal | Blackpool |
| Home Championship | England | Scotland |

Notes = Number in parentheses is the times that club has won that honour. * indicates new record for competition

== FA Cup ==
West Bromwich Albion defeated Preston North End 3–2 in the 1954 FA Cup Final to lift the FA Cup for the fourth time.

== Football League ==
=== First Division ===
| Pos | Team | Pld | W | D | L | GF | GA | GAv | Pts | Relegation |
|---|---|---|---|---|---|---|---|---|---|---|
| 1 | Wolverhampton Wanderers (C) | 42 | 25 | 7 | 10 | 96 | 56 | 1.714 | 57 | |
| 2 | West Bromwich Albion | 42 | 22 | 9 | 11 | 86 | 63 | 1.365 | 53 | |
| 3 | Huddersfield Town | 42 | 20 | 11 | 11 | 78 | 61 | 1.279 | 51 | |
| 4 | Manchester United | 42 | 18 | 12 | 12 | 73 | 58 | 1.259 | 48 | |
| 5 | Bolton Wanderers | 42 | 18 | 12 | 12 | 75 | 60 | 1.250 | 48 | |
| 6 | Blackpool | 42 | 19 | 10 | 13 | 80 | 69 | 1.159 | 48 | |
| 7 | Burnley | 42 | 21 | 4 | 17 | 78 | 67 | 1.164 | 46 | |
| 8 | Chelsea | 42 | 16 | 12 | 14 | 74 | 68 | 1.088 | 44 | |
| 9 | Charlton Athletic | 42 | 19 | 6 | 17 | 75 | 77 | 0.974 | 44 | |
| 10 | Cardiff City | 42 | 18 | 8 | 16 | 51 | 71 | 0.718 | 44 | |
| 11 | Preston North End | 42 | 19 | 5 | 18 | 87 | 58 | 1.500 | 43 | |
| 12 | Arsenal | 42 | 15 | 13 | 14 | 75 | 73 | 1.027 | 43 | |
| 13 | Aston Villa | 42 | 16 | 9 | 17 | 70 | 68 | 1.029 | 41 | |
| 14 | Portsmouth | 42 | 14 | 11 | 17 | 81 | 89 | 0.910 | 39 | |
| 15 | Newcastle United | 42 | 14 | 10 | 18 | 72 | 77 | 0.935 | 38 | |
| 16 | Tottenham Hotspur | 42 | 16 | 5 | 21 | 65 | 76 | 0.855 | 37 | |
| 17 | Manchester City | 42 | 14 | 9 | 19 | 62 | 77 | 0.805 | 37 | |
| 18 | Sunderland | 42 | 14 | 8 | 20 | 81 | 89 | 0.910 | 36 | |
| 19 | Sheffield Wednesday | 42 | 15 | 6 | 21 | 70 | 91 | 0.769 | 36 | |
| 20 | Sheffield United | 42 | 11 | 11 | 20 | 69 | 90 | 0.767 | 33 | |
| 21 | Middlesbrough (R) | 42 | 10 | 10 | 22 | 60 | 91 | 0.659 | 30 | Relegation to the Second Division |
| 22 | Liverpool (R) | 42 | 9 | 10 | 23 | 68 | 97 | 0.701 | 28 | Relegation to the Second Division |

Source: World Football
Rules for classification: 1) Points; 2) Goal average; 3) Goals scored
(C) Champions; (R) Relegated

=== Second Division ===
| Pos | Team | Pld | W | D | L | GF | GA | GAv | Pts | Qualification or relegation |
|---|---|---|---|---|---|---|---|---|---|---|
| 1 | Leicester City (C, P) | 42 | 23 | 10 | 9 | 97 | 60 | 1.617 | 56 | Promotion to the First Division |
| 2 | Everton (P) | 42 | 20 | 16 | 6 | 92 | 58 | 1.586 | 56 | Promotion to the First Division |
| 3 | Blackburn Rovers | 42 | 23 | 9 | 10 | 86 | 50 | 1.720 | 55 | |
| 4 | Nottingham Forest | 42 | 20 | 12 | 10 | 86 | 59 | 1.458 | 52 | |
| 5 | Rotherham United | 42 | 21 | 7 | 14 | 80 | 67 | 1.194 | 49 | |
| 6 | Luton Town | 42 | 18 | 12 | 12 | 64 | 59 | 1.085 | 48 | |
| 7 | Birmingham City | 42 | 18 | 11 | 13 | 78 | 58 | 1.345 | 47 | |
| 8 | Fulham | 42 | 17 | 10 | 15 | 98 | 85 | 1.153 | 44 | |
| 9 | Bristol Rovers | 42 | 14 | 16 | 12 | 64 | 58 | 1.103 | 44 | |
| 10 | Leeds United | 42 | 15 | 13 | 14 | 89 | 81 | 1.099 | 43 | |
| 11 | Stoke City | 42 | 12 | 17 | 13 | 71 | 60 | 1.183 | 41 | |
| 12 | Doncaster Rovers | 42 | 16 | 9 | 17 | 59 | 63 | 0.937 | 41 | |
| 13 | West Ham United | 42 | 15 | 9 | 18 | 67 | 69 | 0.971 | 39 | |
| 14 | Notts County | 42 | 13 | 13 | 16 | 54 | 74 | 0.730 | 39 | |
| 15 | Hull City | 42 | 16 | 6 | 20 | 64 | 66 | 0.970 | 38 | |
| 16 | Lincoln City | 42 | 14 | 9 | 19 | 65 | 83 | 0.783 | 37 | |
| 17 | Bury | 42 | 11 | 14 | 17 | 54 | 72 | 0.750 | 36 | |
| 18 | Derby County | 42 | 12 | 11 | 19 | 64 | 82 | 0.780 | 35 | |
| 19 | Plymouth Argyle | 42 | 9 | 16 | 17 | 65 | 82 | 0.793 | 34 | |
| 20 | Swansea Town | 42 | 13 | 8 | 21 | 58 | 82 | 0.707 | 34 | |
| 21 | Brentford (R) | 42 | 10 | 11 | 21 | 40 | 78 | 0.513 | 31 | Relegation to the Third Division South |
| 22 | Oldham Athletic (R) | 42 | 8 | 9 | 25 | 40 | 89 | 0.449 | 25 | Relegation to the Third Division North |

Rules for classification: 1) Points; 2) Goal average; 3) Goals scored
(C) Champions; (P) Promoted; (R) Relegated

=== Third Division North ===
| Pos | Team | Pld | W | D | L | GF | GA | GAv | Pts | Promotion or relegation |
|---|---|---|---|---|---|---|---|---|---|---|
| 1 | Port Vale (C, P) | 46 | 26 | 17 | 3 | 74 | 21 | 3.524 | 69 | Promotion to the Second Division |
| 2 | Barnsley | 46 | 24 | 10 | 12 | 77 | 57 | 1.351 | 58 | |
| 3 | Scunthorpe & Lindsey United | 46 | 21 | 15 | 10 | 77 | 56 | 1.375 | 57 | |
| 4 | Gateshead | 46 | 21 | 13 | 12 | 74 | 55 | 1.345 | 55 | |
| 5 | Bradford City | 46 | 22 | 9 | 15 | 60 | 55 | 1.091 | 53 | |
| 6 | Chesterfield | 46 | 19 | 14 | 13 | 76 | 64 | 1.188 | 52 | |
| 7 | Mansfield Town | 46 | 20 | 11 | 15 | 88 | 67 | 1.313 | 51 | |
| 8 | Wrexham | 46 | 21 | 9 | 16 | 81 | 68 | 1.191 | 51 | |
| 9 | Bradford (Park Avenue) | 46 | 18 | 14 | 14 | 77 | 68 | 1.132 | 50 | |
| 10 | Stockport County | 46 | 18 | 11 | 17 | 77 | 67 | 1.149 | 47 | |
| 11 | Southport | 46 | 17 | 12 | 17 | 63 | 60 | 1.050 | 46 | |
| 12 | Barrow | 46 | 16 | 12 | 18 | 72 | 71 | 1.014 | 44 | |
| 13 | Carlisle United | 46 | 14 | 15 | 17 | 83 | 71 | 1.169 | 43 | |
| 14 | Tranmere Rovers | 46 | 18 | 7 | 21 | 59 | 70 | 0.843 | 43 | |
| 15 | Accrington Stanley | 46 | 16 | 10 | 20 | 66 | 74 | 0.892 | 42 | |
| 16 | Crewe Alexandra | 46 | 14 | 13 | 19 | 49 | 67 | 0.731 | 41 | |
| 17 | Grimsby Town | 46 | 16 | 9 | 21 | 51 | 77 | 0.662 | 41 | |
| 18 | Hartlepools United | 46 | 13 | 14 | 19 | 59 | 65 | 0.908 | 40 | |
| 19 | Rochdale | 46 | 15 | 10 | 21 | 59 | 77 | 0.766 | 40 | |
| 20 | Workington | 46 | 13 | 14 | 19 | 59 | 80 | 0.738 | 40 | |
| 21 | Darlington | 46 | 12 | 14 | 20 | 50 | 71 | 0.704 | 38 | |
| 22 | York City | 46 | 12 | 13 | 21 | 64 | 86 | 0.744 | 37 | |
| 23 | Halifax Town | 46 | 12 | 10 | 24 | 44 | 73 | 0.603 | 34 | Re-elected |
| 24 | Chester | 46 | 11 | 10 | 25 | 48 | 67 | 0.716 | 32 | Re-elected |

Source: rsssf.com
(C) Division Champions; (P) Promoted

=== Third Division South ===
| Pos | Team | Pld | W | D | L | GF | GA | GAv | Pts | Promotion or relegation |
|---|---|---|---|---|---|---|---|---|---|---|
| 1 | Ipswich Town (C, P) | 46 | 27 | 10 | 9 | 82 | 51 | 1.608 | 64 | Promotion to the Second Division |
| 2 | Brighton & Hove Albion | 46 | 26 | 9 | 11 | 86 | 61 | 1.410 | 61 | |
| 3 | Bristol City | 46 | 25 | 6 | 15 | 88 | 66 | 1.333 | 56 | |
| 4 | Watford | 46 | 21 | 10 | 15 | 85 | 69 | 1.232 | 52 | |
| 5 | Northampton Town | 46 | 20 | 11 | 15 | 82 | 55 | 1.491 | 51 | |
| 6 | Southampton | 46 | 22 | 7 | 17 | 76 | 63 | 1.206 | 51 | |
| 7 | Norwich City | 46 | 20 | 11 | 15 | 73 | 66 | 1.106 | 51 | |
| 8 | Reading | 46 | 20 | 9 | 17 | 86 | 73 | 1.178 | 49 | |
| 9 | Exeter City | 46 | 20 | 8 | 18 | 68 | 58 | 1.172 | 48 | |
| 10 | Gillingham | 46 | 19 | 10 | 17 | 61 | 66 | 0.924 | 48 | |
| 11 | Leyton Orient | 46 | 18 | 11 | 17 | 79 | 73 | 1.082 | 47 | |
| 12 | Millwall | 46 | 19 | 9 | 18 | 74 | 77 | 0.961 | 47 | |
| 13 | Torquay United | 46 | 17 | 12 | 17 | 81 | 88 | 0.920 | 46 | |
| 14 | Coventry City | 46 | 18 | 9 | 19 | 61 | 56 | 1.089 | 45 | |
| 15 | Newport County | 46 | 19 | 6 | 21 | 61 | 81 | 0.753 | 44 | |
| 16 | Southend United | 46 | 18 | 7 | 21 | 69 | 71 | 0.972 | 43 | |
| 17 | Aldershot | 46 | 17 | 9 | 20 | 74 | 86 | 0.860 | 43 | |
| 18 | Queens Park Rangers | 46 | 16 | 10 | 20 | 60 | 68 | 0.882 | 42 | |
| 19 | Bournemouth & Boscombe Athletic | 46 | 16 | 8 | 22 | 67 | 70 | 0.957 | 40 | |
| 20 | Swindon Town | 46 | 15 | 10 | 21 | 67 | 70 | 0.957 | 40 | |
| 21 | Shrewsbury Town | 46 | 14 | 12 | 20 | 65 | 76 | 0.855 | 40 | |
| 22 | Crystal Palace | 46 | 14 | 12 | 20 | 60 | 86 | 0.698 | 40 | |
| 23 | Colchester United | 46 | 10 | 10 | 26 | 50 | 78 | 0.641 | 30 | Re-elected |
| 24 | Walsall | 46 | 9 | 8 | 29 | 40 | 87 | 0.460 | 26 | Re-elected |

Source: rsssf.com
(C) Champions; (P) Promoted

=== Top goalscorers ===
First Division

- Jimmy Glazzard (Huddersfield Town) – 29 goals

Second Division

- John Charles (Leeds United) – 42 goals

Third Division North

- Alan Ashman (Carlisle United) – 30 goals

Third Division South

- Jack English (Northampton Town) – 28 goals
