= Willie Forbes =

Scottish footballer (1922–1999)

Personal information
- Full name: William Forbes
- Date of birth: 25 May 1922
- Place of birth: Glasgow, Scotland
- Date of death: 31 January 1999 (aged 76)
- Place of death: Chorley, England
- Position: Wing half

Senior career*
Years	Team	Apps	(Gls)
1946	Dunfermline Athletic	6	(0)
1946–1950	Wolverhampton Wanderers	71	(23)
1950–1956	Preston North End	192	(7)
1956–1958	Carlisle United	26	(0)
- * Club domestic league appearances and goals

William Forbes (25 May 1922 – 31 January 1999) was a Scottish footballer, who played for Dunfermline Athletic, Wolverhampton Wanderers, Preston North End and Carlisle United.

== Honours ==
Preston North End

- FA Cup runner-up: 1953–54
