= Frank Griffin (English footballer) =

English footballer (1928–2007)

Personal information
- Full name: Frank Albert Griffin
- Date of birth: 28 March 1928
- Place of birth: Pendlebury, Lancashire, England
- Date of death: 4 June 2007 (aged 79)
- Position: Winger

Youth career
- Eccles Town

Senior career*
Years	Team	Apps	(Gls)
1950–1951	Shrewsbury Town	37	(5)
1951–1959	West Bromwich Albion	240	(47)
1959–1960	Northampton Town	16	(0)
1960–?	Wellington Town		
- * Club domestic league appearances and goals

Frank Albert Griffin (28 March 1928 – 4 June 2007) was an English professional footballer. He played as a winger and his most notable achievement was scoring the winning goal in the 1954 FA Cup Final.

== Football career ==
Born in Pendlebury, near Manchester, Griffin began his career at Shrewsbury Town. He clocked up 5 goals in 37 appearances for the Shropshire club, including the winner against Wrexham in the first Football League match at the Gay Meadow, in 1950.

In April 1951, just a month after turning professional, he left for West Bromwich Albion, making his Albion debut against Sunderland at Roker Park. In the 1953–54 season, West Bromwich dominated the league, but faltered in the closing weeks and eventually finished second, which was their best finish since 1924. In the FA Cup Final which followed, they faced Preston North End and fought back from 2–1 down to equalise, before Griffin scored the winning goal in the 87th minute when he hit a low right footed shot past the goalkeeper from the right of the six yard box.

In an FA Cup match in February 1958, Griffin broke his leg in two places, which effectively ended his career. He was to make just 6 more appearances for Albion after his recovery. After leaving Albion he slipped down the divisions in successive seasons, playing first for Northampton Town then Wellington Town.

== Honours ==
West Bromwich Albion

- FA Cup: 1953–54
