= Pegasus A.F.C. =

Association football club in England

Pegasus
- Full name: Pegasus Association Football Club
- Founded: 2 May 1948
- Dissolved: 1963
- Ground: Iffley Road, Oxford
Home colours

Pegasus Association Football Club was an English amateur football club that ran from 1948 to 1963, based in Oxford and composed of Oxbridge (Oxford and Cambridge) university students. While the club saw success in the 1950s, they disbanded the following decade after defections to rival clubs.

== History ==
The club was founded in 1948 as a joint venture of Oxford University A.F.C. and Cambridge University A.F.C., instigated by Harold Warris Thompson, professor at St. John's College, Oxford and later an administrator with The Football Association. The founding president was Kenneth Hunt, formerly of the star amateur club Corinthian F.C. The symbol Pegasus was chosen as containing elements from the logos of the football clubs of both Oxford University (a centaur) and Cambridge University (a falcon). At first, members had to be current Oxford or Cambridge University players or to have left the previous year, but this rule was later relaxed. In the postwar years, Oxbridge students included many men in their twenties demobilised from service in World War II.

Pegasus had an attractive style similar to the Tottenham Hotspur of the day, whose Vic Buckingham and Bill Nicholson had previously coached Oxford and Cambridge respectively. The club had great success in the 1950s including wins at Wembley Stadium in the FA Amateur Cup in 1951, which finished 2–1 against Bishop Auckland, and 1953, which finished 6–0 against Harwich & Parkeston in front of a full house of 100,000 spectators. On both occasions, the semi-final was played at Highbury and was drawn, so that a replay was necessary. In the 1951 semi-final, Pegasus's opponents, Hendon, were awarded a penalty in the last minute, but missed it, and Pegasus won the replay at Selhurst Park. In 1954, Pegasus toured Hong Kong, and supplied seven members of the England amateur international team.

Changes in university culture in the 1960s and defections to Corinthian-Casuals undermined its ethos and the club folded in 1963, following an Oxfordshire Senior Cup tie against Marston United.

== Colours ==
The club played in white shirts, navy blue shorts (in honour of Oxford), and sky blue socks (in honour of Cambridge), with a badge of a sky blue Pegasus on a dark blue patch.

== Ground ==
The club used Iffley Road in Oxford for its home matches, as the Cambridge pitch at Grange Road was owned by the Cambridge University rugby club.

== Famous coaches ==
- Vic Buckingham
- Joe Mercer
- Malcolm Allison
- Arthur Rowe

== Famous officials ==
- Reverend Kenneth Hunt, founding president
- Sir Harold Warris Thompson

== Honours ==
- FA Amateur Cup
  - Winners: 1950–51, 1952–53
- Oxfordshire Senior Cup
  - Winners: 1949–50, 1957–58
