= Stan Rickaby =

English footballer (1924–2014)

Personal information
- Full name: Stanley Rickaby
- Date of birth: 12 March 1924
- Place of birth: Stockton-on-Tees, England
- Date of death: 8 February 2014 (aged 89)
- Place of death: Perth, Australia
- Position: Right-back

Youth career
- 1940–1941: South Bank
- 1941–1946: Middlesbrough

Senior career*
Years	Team	Apps	(Gls)
1946–1950	Middlesbrough	10	(0)
1950–1955	West Bromwich Albion	189	(2)
1955–1960	Poole Town (player-manager)		
1960–1961	Weymouth		
1963–1964	Newton Abbot Spurs		

International career
1953	England	1	(0)
- * Club domestic league appearances and goals

Stanley Rickaby (12 March 1924 – 8 February 2014) was an English footballer who played as a right-back.

== Career ==
Rickaby was born in Stockton-on-Tees. He began his career with South Bank in 1940 and in July of the following year joined Middlesbrough as an amateur. He turned professional with Boro in July 1946. In February 1950 he signed for West Bromwich Albion for a fee of £7,500. He made his only appearance for England on 11 November 1953, in a 3–1 win against Northern Ireland at Goodison Park. A leg injury sustained in the 1954 FA Cup semi-final against Port Vale meant that Rickaby missed the final, but he nevertheless received a winner's medal, having played in all the previous rounds of the competition. He took up the role of player-manager at Poole Town in the Southern Football League in June 1955, where he was sacked from the manager position in December 1959 and replaced by the former Real Madrid manager Michael Keeping. After this he moved to Weymouth. Rickaby transferred to Newton Abbot Spurs in August 1963 before retiring as a player a year later.

== Later life ==
Rickaby moved to Australia in the late 1960s to work with Aboriginal communities and published his autobiography in 2002.

== Death ==
He died on Saturday 8 February in Perth, Western Australia from natural causes at the age of 89. News of his death only reached the United Kingdom on 3 March 2014. As a tribute to Rickaby, a minute's applause took place prior to West Bromwich Albion's home game against Manchester United on 8 March.
