= Jimmy Dudley (footballer) =

Scottish footballer (1928–2006)

Personal information
- Full name: James George Dudley
- Date of birth: 24 August 1928
- Place of birth: Gartcosh, Lanarkshire, Scotland
- Date of death: 25 April 2006 (aged 77)
- Place of death: West Bromwich, England
- Position: Wing half

Youth career
- 1944–1945: West Bromwich Albion (amateur)

Senior career*
Years	Team	Apps	(Gls)
1945–1959	West Bromwich Albion	285	(9)
1959–1964	Walsall	167	(3)
1964–1967	Stourbridge		
1967–1968	Arcadia United	10	(0)

International career
1954	Scotland B	1	(0)
- * Club domestic league appearances and goals

James George Dudley (24 August 1928 – 25 April 2006) was a Scottish footballer. He was a member of West Bromwich Albion's 1954 FA Cup winning side and scored the equalising goal against Port Vale in the semi-final at Villa Park. Albion finished as league runners-up in the same season.

Dudley made 166 successive appearances between 1952 and 1956, a club record that was surpassed by Ally Robertson in 1979.

After his football career, Dudley worked at Guest Motors West Bromwich Ford dealer as a van parts salesman

== Honours ==
West Bromwich Albion

- FA Cup: 1953–54

Walsall

- Football League Fourth Division: 1959–60
