= Vic Buckingham =

English footballer and manager (1915–1995)

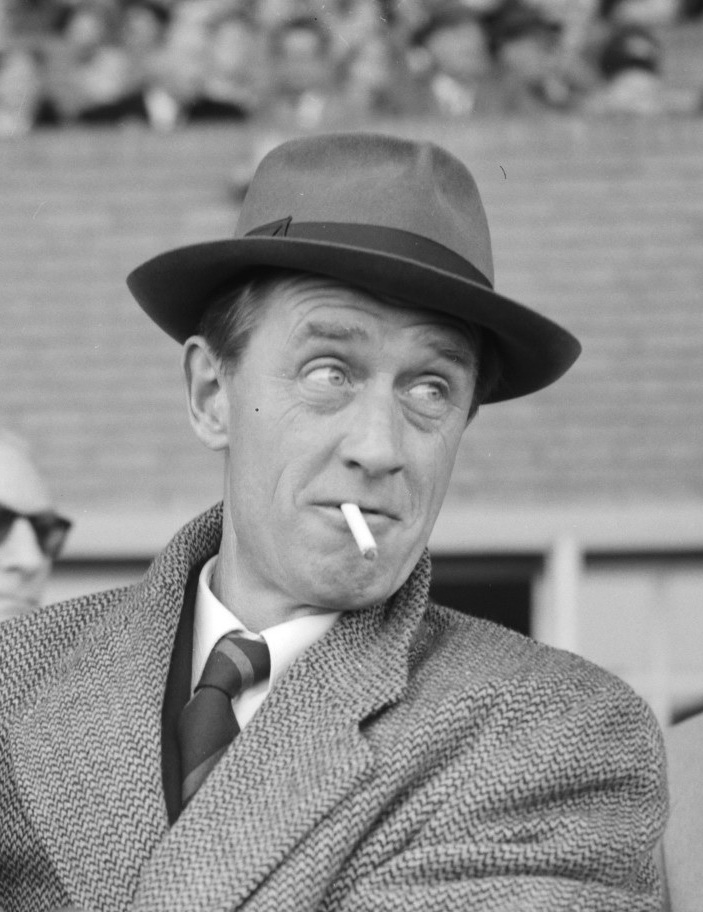
- Buckingham in 1960

Personal information
- Full name: Victor Frederick Buckingham
- Date of birth: 23 October 1915
- Place of birth: Greenwich, England
- Date of death: 26 January 1995 (aged 79)
- Place of death: Chichester, England
- Height: 5 ft 10 in (1.78 m)
- Position: Wing-half

Senior career*
Years	Team	Apps	(Gls)
1934–1935	Northfleet United		
1935–1949	Tottenham Hotspur	204	(1)

Managerial career
- 1950–1951: Pegasus
- 1951–1953: Bradford Park Avenue
- 1953–1959: West Bromwich Albion
- 1959–1961: Ajax
- 1961–1964: Sheffield Wednesday
- 1964–1965: Ajax
- 1965–1968: Fulham
- 1968–1969: Ethnikos Piraeus
- 1969–1971: Barcelona
- 1972: Sevilla
- 1973–1975: Ethnikos Piraeus
- 1975–1976: Olympiacos
- 1979–1980: Rodos
- * Club domestic league appearances and goals

Victor Frederick Buckingham (23 October 1915 – 26 January 1995) was an English football player and manager.

He played for Second Division side Tottenham Hotspur. As manager he won the 1954 FA Cup final with West Bromwich Albion and finished runners-up in the First Division. He had two periods as manager of Ajax, leading the side to the Dutch Championship of 1960. In 1964, Johan Cruyff made his league debut under him.

In 1971, Buckingham's Barcelona side finished as league runners-up and won the Spanish Cup. He also held manager positions with Fulham, Sheffield Wednesday and in Greece. Buckingham is considered to have been a pioneer of the footballing philosophy known as Total Football, later further developed by his protégé Johan Cruyff.

== Career ==
Buckingham joined Tottenham Hotspur in 1934 and played the first season (1934–35) for Tottenham Hotspur nursery club Northfleet United. After that single season he returned to Tottenham, then playing in the Second Division, where he accumulated 230 matches as a defensive midfielder and later defender before leaving in 1949.

He started his managerial career at Oxford University 1949–50. After this, he headed the joint amateur team of Oxford and Cambridge Universities, Pegasus, with which he won in 1951 the FA Amateur Cup, defeating Bishop Auckland in the final 2–1 in front of a crowd of 100,000 at Wembley Stadium, playing an "attractive push-and-run style of football where they worked hard for one another, kept it simple and passed the ball quickly".

Between 1951 and 1953, he managed Bradford Park Avenue, then playing in the Third Division North of the Football, reaching upper midtable places.

In 1953, he was hired at West Bromwich Albion as successor to Jesse Carver, who returned to Italy. He became the club's longest-serving post-war manager, almost leading them to the "double" in 1954 when they won the FA Cup, defeating Preston North End 3–2, and finished second in the league.

In 1959, he became manager of Ajax, succeeding the Austrian Karl Humenberger in the dugout. There he won the 1959–60 Eredivisie. For personal reasons he left the club at the end of May 1960, a couple of weeks before the end of the 1960–61 season. With the only 28-year-old Keith Spurgeon, who was recommended to Ajax by the English FA, another Englishman, the sixth in the history of the club, became trainer of Ajax. He would stay until the end of the following season.

Initially, it was rumoured Buckingham might join Plymouth Argyle, but he ended up at Sheffield Wednesday, runners-up in the 1960–61 First Division, where he replaced Harry Catterick, who was lured to Everton two games before the end of the season. Under Buckingham's management, Sheffield Wednesday finished in sixth place in three consecutive seasons. On 9 April 1964, he was sacked from his £3,000 a year job with the club. Jack Mansell, who was suspended by Buckingham from the first team's coaching staff, replaced him as caretaker manager.

Buckingham was never thought to be personally involved in the British betting scandal of 1964, which was revealed on 12 April 1964, however the club management alleged in the aftermath, that lax discipline under him may have played a role. Three of his players at Wednesday – Peter Swan, Tony Kay and David Layne – were accused of taking bribes to fix a match with Ipswich Town on 1 December 1962 and betting on their team to lose, which then lost 2–0.

For the 1964–65 season he returned to Ajax. This time, the only success was the league debut of the 17-year-old Johan Cruijff in November. Poor results, including a 9–4 defeat in Rotterdam to Feijenoord, saw Ajax just three points above the relegation zone. By January 1965, Buckingham had left the club. In Amsterdam, this was the beginning of the era of Rinus Michels.

In later years, Johan Cruijff would speak about Vic Buckingham and Keith Spurgeon:

"They were open-minded but, tactically, you have to see where we were at that time. Football in Holland then was good but it was not really professional. They gave us some professionalism because they were much further down the road. But the tactical thinking came later with Michels. It started then."

Back in England, Buckingham joined First Division side Fulham in January 1965. The club was struggling at the time and were later relegated in 1968. It is said that the purchase of Allan Clarke from Walsall was one of his best decisions in that time. With 45 goals in 86 matches until 1968, Clarke contributed to the club staying up as long as it did and after relegation he was sold for £150,000, then the record British transfer fee.

After a brief stint in Greece, he was hired in 1969 by Barcelona in Spain. There, he won the Spanish Cup, the Copa del Generalísimo of 1970–71, in a 4–3 win after extra time against Valencia in the final. In the same season, Barcelona were runner up in the league, behind Valencia. They were equal on points, but Valencia prevailed due to the results of the matches against each other: Barça lost 2–0 at home and drew 1–1 away. After this season, it was once more that Rinus Michels replaced him. Amongst the stars of this Barcelona side were Joaquim Rifé, Carles Rexach, Josep Maria Fusté and Juan Manuel Asensi.

In February 1972, he joined Sevilla, but was unable to avoid relegation with the club. Thereafter, he had two more engagements in Greece. When he was hired by Greek champions Olympiacos in 1975, he finished the season to 1976 in third place and did not gain an extension to his contract. His last job was with Rodos, another Greek First Division side, where he joined at the beginning of the 1979–80 season. The team was relegated at the end of the season.

== Personal life ==
Buckingham was born in Greenwich, the son of Annie Elizabeth Jenkins and William George Buckingham. He was married to Lilian Emma King and had three children. He died aged 79 in Chichester, England.

== Managerial statistics ==
Team	From	To	Record				
Team	From	To	G	W	D	L	Win %
Bradford Park Avenue	8 July 1951	5 July 1953	100	42	26	32	42.00
West Bromwich Albion	1 February 1953	3 June 1959	301	130	78	93	43.19
Ajax	3 June 1959	7 June 1961	76	51	13	12	67.11
Sheffield Wednesday	10 June 1961	9 April 1964	134	63	47	24	47.01
Ajax	9 April 1964	6 January 1965	28	9	5	14	32.14
Fulham	13 Αpril 1965	10 January 1968	142	45	33	64	31.69
Ethnikos Piraeus	7 July 1968	24 December 1969	39	13	11	15	33.33
Barcelona	24 December 1969	8 July 1971	65	33	16	16	50.77
Sevilla	5 March 1972	30 September 1972	16	5	5	6	31.25
Ethnikos Piraeus	2 August 1973	16 March 1975	58	28	10	20	48.28
Olympiacos	8 July 1975	24 June 1976	36	20	11	5	55.56
Rodos	19 July 1979	22 June 1980	35	5	9	21	14.29
Enosis Neon Paralimni	7 July 1982	26 December 1982	13	5	5	3	38.46
Total			1,043	449	269	325	43.05

== Managerial honours ==
West Bromwich Albion

- Football League First Division runner-up: 1953–54
- FA Cup: 1954
- FA Charity Shield: 1954 (shared with Wolverhampton Wanderers)

Ajax

- Eredivisie: 1959–60; runner-up 1960–61

Barcelona

- Copa del Generalísimo: 1970–71
- Primera División runner-up: 1970–71
