= 1953–54 FA Cup =

Tournament details
- Country: England; Wales

Final positions
- Champions: West Bromwich Albion (4th title)
- Runners-up: Preston North End

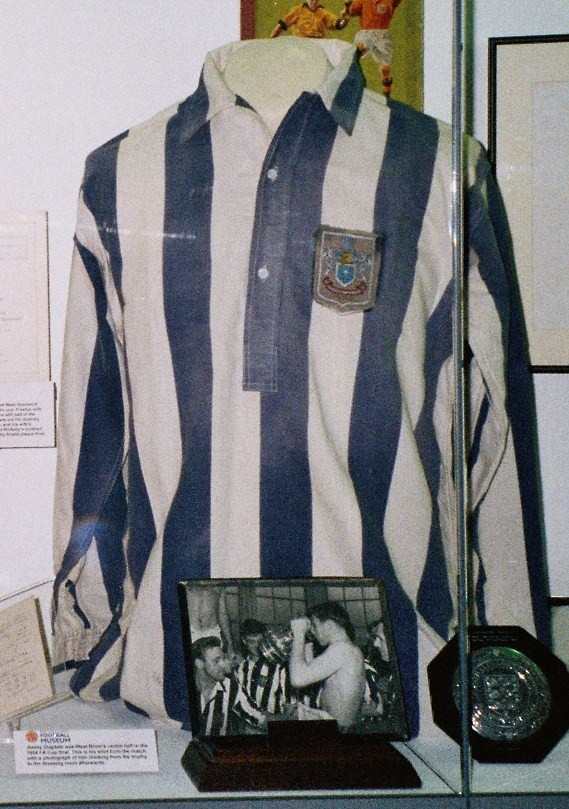

The 1953–54 FA Cup was the 73rd staging of the world's oldest football cup competition, the Football Association Challenge Cup, commonly known as the FA Cup. West Bromwich Albion won the competition for the fourth time, beating Preston North End 3–2 in the final at Wembley.

Matches were scheduled to be played at the stadium of the team named first on the date specified for each round, which was always a Saturday. Some matches, however, might be rescheduled for other days if there were clashes with games for other competitions or the weather was inclement. If scores were level after 90 minutes had been played, a replay would take place at the stadium of the second-named team later the same week. If the replayed match was drawn further replays would be held until a winner was determined. If scores were level after 90 minutes had been played in a replay, a 30-minute period of extra time would be played.

== Calendar ==
Round	Date
Preliminary round	Saturday 12 September 1953
First qualifying round	Saturday 26 September 1953
Second qualifying round	Saturday 10 October 1953
Third qualifying round	Saturday 24 October 1953
Fourth qualifying round	Saturday 7 November 1953
First round proper	Saturday 21 November 1953
Second round	Saturday 12 December 1953
Third round	Saturday 9 January 1954
Fourth round	Saturday 30 January 1954
Fifth round	Saturday 20 February 1954
Sixth round	Saturday 13 March 1954
Semifinals	Saturday 27 March 1954
Final	Saturday 1 May 1954

== Qualifying rounds ==
Most participating clubs that were not members of the Football League competed in the qualifying rounds to secure one of 30 places available in the first round.

The winners from the fourth qualifying round were Blyth Spartans, Ferryhill Athletic, Spennymoor United, Horden Colliery Welfare, Scarborough, Wigan Athletic, Rhyl, Nelson, Witton Albion, Nuneaton Borough, Wellington Town, Selby Town, Gainsborough Trinity, Boston United, Hereford United, Kettering Town, Peterborough United, Bedford Town, Cambridge United, Great Yarmouth Town, Hitchin Town, Finchley, Headington United, Guildford City, Hastings United, Newport (IOW), Llanelli, Bath City, Yeovil Town and Weymouth.

Coincidentally, the two clubs appearing in the competition proper for the first time were Headington United - later to be known as Oxford United - and Cambridge United. However, Hitchin Town was featuring at this stage for the first time in their own right after predecessor club Hitchin FC had last appeared in the main draw in 1887-88. Of the others, Wigan Athletic was advancing from the qualifying rounds for the first time since 1937-38 and Ferryhill Athletic for the first time since 1935-36.

Hastings United and Headington United were the most successful qualifying clubs, participating in eight rounds of the tournament each. Hastings defeated Shoreham, Horsham, Eastbourne, Ashford Town (Kent), Hounslow Town, Guildford City and Swindon Town before losing to Norwich City in the third round; while Headington defeated Aylesbury United, Maidenhead United, Chesham United, Wealdstone, Harwich & Parkeston, Millwall and Stockport County before losing to Bolton Wanderers in the fourth round.

== First round proper ==
At this stage the 48 clubs from the Football League Third Division North and South joined the 30 non-league clubs who came through the qualifying rounds. The final two non-league sides in the draw, Harwich & Parkeston and Walthamstow Avenue, were given byes to this round. Harwich & Parkeston were the runners-up from the previous season's FA Amateur Cup, but the bye was passed on to them as the champions Pegasus did not compete in the FA Cup.

Matches were scheduled to be played on Saturday, 21 November 1953. Seven were drawn and went to replays.

Tie no	Home team	Score	Away team	Date
1	Darlington	1–3	Port Vale	21 November 1953
2	Hastings United	1–0	Guildford City	21 November 1953
3	Bath City	0–3	Walsall	21 November 1953
4	Finchley	1–3	Southend United	21 November 1953
5	Southampton	1–1	Bournemouth & Boscombe Athletic	21 November 1953
Replay	Bournemouth & Boscombe Athletic	3–1	Southampton	25 November 1953
6	Weymouth	2–0	Bedford Town	21 November 1953
7	Yeovil Town	0–2	Norwich City	21 November 1953
8	Grimsby Town	2–0	Rochdale	21 November 1953
9	Crewe Alexandra	0–0	Bradford City	21 November 1953
Replay	Bradford City	0–1	Crewe Alexandra	25 November 1953
10	Gainsborough Trinity	1–4	Chesterfield	21 November 1953
11	Swindon Town	2–1	Newport (IOW)	21 November 1953
12	Ipswich Town	4–1	Reading	21 November 1953
13	Stockport County	4–2	Chester	21 November 1953
14	Queens Park Rangers	2–0	Shrewsbury Town	21 November 1953
15	Barnsley	5–2	York City	21 November 1953
16	Northampton Town	3–0	Llanelli	21 November 1953
17	Harwich & Parkeston	2–3	Headington United	21 November 1953
18	Great Yarmouth Town	1–0	Crystal Palace	21 November 1953
19	Brighton & Hove Albion	5–1	Coventry City	21 November 1953
20	Spennymoor United	0–3	Barrow	21 November 1953
21	Hitchin Town	1–3	Peterborough United	21 November 1953
22	Witton Albion	4–1	Nelson	21 November 1953
23	Exeter City	1–1	Hereford United	21 November 1953
Replay	Hereford United	2–0	Exeter City	26 November 1953
24	Hartlepools United	1–1	Mansfield Town	21 November 1953
Replay	Mansfield Town	0–3	Hartlepools United	25 November 1953
25	Scunthorpe & Lindsey United	9–0	Boston United	21 November 1953
26	Blyth Spartans	0–1	Accrington Stanley	21 November 1953
27	Halifax Town	0–0	Rhyl	21 November 1953
Replay	Rhyl	4–3	Halifax Town	26 November 1953
28	Southport	1–0	Carlisle United	21 November 1953
29	Selby Town	0–2	Bradford Park Avenue	21 November 1953
30	Torquay United	1–3	Bristol City	21 November 1953
31	Workington	3–0	Ferryhill Athletic	21 November 1953
32	Walthamstow Avenue	1–0	Gillingham	21 November 1953
33	Aldershot	5–3	Wellington Town	21 November 1953
34	Horden Colliery Welfare	0–1	Wrexham	21 November 1953
35	Gateshead	1–2	Tranmere Rovers	21 November 1953
36	Wigan Athletic	4–0	Scarborough	21 November 1953
37	Colchester United	1–1	Millwall	21 November 1953
Replay	Millwall	4–0	Colchester United	23 November 1953
38	Leyton Orient	3–0	Kettering Town	21 November 1953
39	Nuneaton Borough	3–0	Watford	21 November 1953
40	Cambridge United	2–2	Newport County	21 November 1953
Replay	Newport County	1–2	Cambridge United	26 November 1953

== Second round proper ==
The matches were scheduled for Saturday, 12 December 1953. Eight matches were drawn, with replays taking place later the same week. The Wrexham–Brighton & Hove Albion match went to a second replay, which finished in Wrexham's favour. Cambridge United and Bradford Park Avenue were meeting in competition for the first time, with Bradford winning this encounter some 16 years before being replaced by Cambridge in the Football League.

Tie no	Home team	Score	Away team	Date
1	Hastings United	4–1	Swindon Town	12 December 1953
2	Barrow	5–2	Great Yarmouth Town	12 December 1953
3	Walsall	3–0	Crewe Alexandra	12 December 1953
4	Wrexham	1–1	Brighton & Hove Albion	12 December 1953
Replay	Brighton & Hove Albion	1–1	Wrexham	16 December 1953
Replay	Wrexham	3–1	Brighton & Hove Albion	21 December 1953
5	Ipswich Town	2–2	Walthamstow Avenue	12 December 1953
Replay	Walthamstow Avenue	0–1	Ipswich Town	16 December 1953
6	Stockport County	2–1	Workington	12 December 1953
7	Queens Park Rangers	1–1	Nuneaton Borough	12 December 1953
Replay	Nuneaton Borough	1–2	Queens Park Rangers	17 December 1953
8	Accrington Stanley	2–2	Tranmere Rovers	12 December 1953
Replay	Tranmere Rovers	5–1	Accrington Stanley	16 December 1953
9	Northampton Town	1–1	Hartlepools United	12 December 1953
Replay	Hartlepools United	1–0	Northampton Town	16 December 1953
10	Rhyl	0–3	Bristol City	12 December 1953
11	Norwich City	2–1	Barnsley	12 December 1953
12	Millwall	3–3	Headington United	12 December 1953
Replay	Headington United	1–0	Millwall	17 December 1953
13	Witton Albion	1–1	Grimsby Town	12 December 1953
Replay	Grimsby Town	6–1	Witton Albion	15 December 1953
14	Southend United	1–2	Chesterfield	12 December 1953
15	Scunthorpe & Lindsey United	1–0	Bournemouth & Boscombe Athletic	12 December 1953
16	Southport	1–1	Port Vale	12 December 1953
Replay	Port Vale	2–0	Southport	14 December 1953
17	Wigan Athletic	4–1	Hereford United	12 December 1953
18	Peterborough United	2–1	Aldershot	12 December 1953
19	Leyton Orient	4–0	Weymouth	12 December 1953
20	Cambridge United	1–2	Bradford Park Avenue	12 December 1953

== Third round proper ==
The 44 First and Second Division clubs entered the competition at this stage.

The matches were scheduled for Saturday, 9 January 1954. Fifteen matches were drawn and went to replays, with three of these requiring a second replay. The Blackpool–Luton Town match then went to a third replay, which was won by Blackpool.

Tie no	Home team	Score	Away team	Date
1	Blackpool	1–1	Luton Town	9 January 1954
Replay	Luton Town	0–0	Blackpool	13 January 1954
Replay	Blackpool	1–1	Luton Town	18 January 1954
Replay	Luton Town	0–2	Blackpool	25 January 1954
2	Chesterfield	2–0	Bury	9 January 1954
3	Hastings United	3–3	Norwich City	9 January 1954
Replay	Norwich City	3–0	Hastings United	13 January 1954
4	Barrow	2–2	Swansea Town	9 January 1954
Replay	Swansea Town	4–2	Barrow	14 January 1954
5	Bristol City	1–3	Rotherham United	9 January 1954
6	Burnley	5–3	Manchester United	9 January 1954
7	Sheffield Wednesday	1–1	Sheffield United	9 January 1954
Replay	Sheffield United	1–3	Sheffield Wednesday	13 January 1954
8	Bolton Wanderers	1–0	Liverpool	9 January 1954
9	Grimsby Town	5–5	Fulham	9 January 1954
Replay	Fulham	3–1	Grimsby Town	18 January 1954
10	Wolverhampton Wanderers	1–2	Birmingham City	9 January 1954
11	Middlesbrough	0–0	Leicester City	9 January 1954
Replay	Leicester City	3–2	Middlesbrough	14 January 1954
12	West Bromwich Albion	1–0	Chelsea	9 January 1954
13	Sunderland	0–2	Doncaster Rovers	9 January 1954
14	Derby County	0–2	Preston North End	9 January 1954
15	Lincoln City	1–1	Walsall	9 January 1954
Replay	Walsall	1–1	Lincoln City	14 January 1954
Replay	Lincoln City	2–1	Walsall	18 January 1954
16	Everton	2–1	Notts County	9 January 1954
17	Wrexham	3–3	Scunthorpe & Lindsey United	9 January 1954
Replay	Scunthorpe & Lindsey United	3–1	Wrexham	14 January 1954
18	Ipswich Town	3–3	Oldham Athletic	9 January 1954
Replay	Oldham Athletic	0–1	Ipswich Town	12 January 1954
19	Tranmere Rovers	2–2	Leyton Orient	9 January 1954
Replay	Leyton Orient	4–1	Tranmere Rovers	14 January 1954
20	Stockport County	0–0	Headington United	9 January 1954
Replay	Headington United	1–0	Stockport County	14 January 1954
21	Newcastle United	2–2	Wigan Athletic	9 January 1954
Replay	Wigan Athletic	2–3	Newcastle United	13 January 1954
22	Queens Park Rangers	0–1	Port Vale	9 January 1954
23	Brentford	0–0	Hull City	9 January 1954
Replay	Hull City	2–2	Brentford	14 January 1954
Replay	Brentford	2–5	Hull City	18 January 1954
24	Bristol Rovers	0–1	Blackburn Rovers	9 January 1954
25	Portsmouth	3–3	Charlton Athletic	9 January 1954
Replay	Charlton Athletic	2–3	Portsmouth	14 January 1954
26	West Ham United	4–0	Huddersfield Town	9 January 1954
27	Plymouth Argyle	2–0	Nottingham Forest	9 January 1954
28	Bradford Park Avenue	2–5	Manchester City	9 January 1954
29	Cardiff City	3–1	Peterborough United	9 January 1954
30	Arsenal	5–1	Aston Villa	9 January 1954
31	Leeds United	3–3	Tottenham Hotspur	9 January 1954
Replay	Tottenham Hotspur	1–0	Leeds United	13 January 1954
32	Stoke City	6–2	Hartlepool United	9 January 1954

== Fourth round proper ==
The matches were scheduled for Saturday, 30 January 1954, with two matches taking place on later dates. Six matches were drawn and went to replays, which were all played in the following midweek fixture. The Scunthorpe & Lindsey–Portsmouth match went to a second replay. Headington United was the last non-league club left in the competition.

Tie no	Home team	Score	Away team	Date
1	Burnley	1–1	Newcastle United	30 January 1954
Replay	Newcastle United	1–0	Burnley	3 February 1954
2	Blackburn Rovers	2–2	Hull City	30 January 1954
Replay	Hull City	2–1	Blackburn Rovers	4 February 1954
3	Sheffield Wednesday	0–0	Chesterfield	30 January 1954
Replay	Chesterfield	2–4	Sheffield Wednesday	3 February 1954
4	West Bromwich Albion	4–0	Rotherham United	30 January 1954
5	Lincoln City	0–2	Preston North End	30 January 1954
6	Everton	3–0	Swansea Town	30 January 1954
7	Ipswich Town	1–0	Birmingham City	30 January 1954
8	Manchester City	0–1	Tottenham Hotspur	30 January 1954
9	West Ham United	1–1	Blackpool	30 January 1954
Replay	Blackpool	3–1	West Ham United	3 February 1954
10	Plymouth Argyle	0–2	Doncaster Rovers	30 January 1954
11	Scunthorpe & Lindsey United	1–1	Portsmouth	30 January 1954
Replay	Portsmouth	2–2	Scunthorpe & Lindsey United	3 February 1954
Replay	Scunthorpe & Lindsey United	0–4	Portsmouth	8 February 1954
12	Cardiff City	0–2	Port Vale	30 January 1954
13	Arsenal	1–2	Norwich City	30 January 1954
14	Stoke City	0–0	Leicester City	30 January 1954
Replay	Leicester City	3–1	Stoke City	2 February 1954
15	Headington United	2–4	Bolton Wanderers	30 January 1954
16	Leyton Orient	2–1	Fulham	30 January 1954

== Fifth round proper ==
The matches were scheduled for Saturday, 20 February 1954. Two matches went to replays in the following mid-week fixture.

Tie no	Home team	Score	Away team	Date
1	Preston North End	6–1	Ipswich Town	20 February 1954
2	Sheffield Wednesday	3–1	Everton	20 February 1954
3	Bolton Wanderers	0–0	Portsmouth	20 February 1954
Replay	Portsmouth	1–2	Bolton Wanderers	24 February 1954
4	West Bromwich Albion	3–2	Newcastle United	20 February 1954
5	Norwich City	1–2	Leicester City	20 February 1954
6	Hull City	1–1	Tottenham Hotspur	20 February 1954
Replay	Tottenham Hotspur	2–0	Hull City	24 February 1954
7	Port Vale	2–0	Blackpool	20 February 1954
8	Leyton Orient	3–1	Doncaster Rovers	20 February 1954

== Sixth round proper ==
The four quarter-final ties were scheduled to be played on Saturday, 13 March 1954. Two matches went to replays, with the Leicester City–Preston North End match going to a second replay.

Tie no	Home team	Score	Away team	Date
1	Leicester City	1–1	Preston North End	13 March 1954
Replay	Preston North End	2–2	Leicester City	17 March 1954
Replay	Leicester City	1–3	Preston North End	22 March 1954
2	Sheffield Wednesday	1–1	Bolton Wanderers	13 March 1954
Replay	Bolton Wanderers	0–2	Sheffield Wednesday	17 March 1954
3	West Bromwich Albion	3–0	Tottenham Hotspur	13 March 1954
4	Leyton Orient	0–1	Port Vale	13 March 1954

== Semifinals ==
The semi-final matches were played on Saturday, 27 March 1954. Preston North End and West Bromwich Albion won their ties to meet in the final at Wembley.

27 March 1954
15:00

Preston North End	2–0	Sheffield Wednesday

Maine Road, Manchester

27 March 1954
15:00

West Bromwich Albion	2–1	Port Vale
Griffin 62'; Allen 70' (pen.)		Leake 40'

Villa Park, Birmingham
Attendance: 68,221

== Final ==
The 1954 FA Cup final was contested by West Bromwich Albion and Preston North End at Wembley. West Brom won 3–2, with goals from Ronnie Allen (2) and Frank Griffin. Angus Morrison and Charlie Wayman scored for Preston.

=== Match details ===
1 May 1954

West Bromwich Albion	3–2	Preston North End
Allen 21' 63' (pen.); Griffin 87'	(Report)	Morrison 35'; Wayman 51'

Wembley, London
Attendance: 100,000 approx.
Referee: A. Luty

West Bromwich Albion	Preston North End
