= Graham Lovett =

English footballer

Personal information
- Full name: Graham John Lovett
- Date of birth: 5 August 1947
- Place of birth: Sheldon, England
- Date of death: 10 May 2018 (aged 70)
- Height: 5 ft 10 in (1.78 m)
- Position: Midfielder

Youth career
- Cockshut Hill
- Sheldon Heath
- Sheldon
- 1964: West Bromwich Albion

Senior career*
Years	Team	Apps	(Gls)
1964–1972	West Bromwich Albion	114	(8)
1971	→ Southampton (loan)	3	(0)
1972–19??	Worcester City		
- Solihull Borough
19??–1977	Greaves		
Total		117	(8)
- * Club domestic league appearances and goals

Graham John Lovett (5 August 1947 – 10 May 2018) was an English footballer who played most of his career as a midfielder for West Bromwich Albion, where he was on the winning sides for the 1966 Football League Cup Final and the 1968 FA Cup Final. He was forced to retire from the game at age 26, following two serious car crashes.

== Early life ==
Lovett was born in Sheldon, Warwickshire, and attended Cockshut Hill and Sheldon Heath schools, whom he represented at football, as well as playing for the Birmingham & County Schools team. At school, he initially intended to follow a career in accountancy, but following the death of his father while Graham was studying for his A levels, his plans changed and he took up the offer of an apprenticeship from West Bromwich Albion in February 1964.

== Football career ==
Lovett signed as a professional in November 1964 and made his first team debut within three weeks as Albion lost 2–0 at home to Chelsea. As a youngster he was compared by his manager, Jimmy Hagan, to Duncan Edwards, the Manchester United and England player who had died in the Munich air disaster in 1958. Lovett was profiled in a matchday programme in which the writer explained how Lovett had acquired his nickname of "Shuv":

Graham drives an eight-year-old car which cost him £150 – and gets his leg pulled by the first teamers about the number of times it needs "a shove".

Lovett himself played down the praise he was receiving:

It's great to be in the first team and playing with the big names against the big names, but there is a nagging feeling which make me wonder whether you deserve the praise, and whether it's going to last. And I am really lost when they start talking about Duncan Edwards or Ray Barlow, neither of whom I ever saw play. But once the game starts, it's all different. The stars often seem quite ordinary when it's under way. And I never have time to worry about the reputations of the opposition.

Lovett soon established himself in the first team and in March 1966 played in the first leg of the League Cup Final against West Ham United. Although Albion lost the first leg 2–1, they won the second (when Lovett was replaced by Bobby Hope) 4–1 to take the cup on aggregate.

Lovett, with his great strength and ability to pass the ball long or short, was becoming an important part of Albion's plans, but his career was interrupted when, on Christmas Eve 1966, he was involved in a car accident on the M1 motorway when his car ran off the road into a ditch. Lovett suffered a broken neck but an operation involving bone grafts enabled him to start to rebuild his football career.

By the end of 1967, he was back in training and playing for the reserves and returned to the first team in January 1968. On 27 January, he became the first Albion player to come on as a substitute in an FA Cup match when he replaced Dick Krzywicki at Colchester United. Lovett's return to the side added "a new precision" to the team who went on to defeat Colchester 4–0 in the replay, in which Lovett made his first start in just over a year.

In the fourth round of the cup, Albion met Southampton who held them to a 1–1 draw at The Hawthorns; in the replay at The Dell, goalkeeper John Osborne had to go to hospital at half-time with concussion. Captain Graham Williams went in goal, with Lovett coming on as substitute. Hugh Fisher then scored for the "Saints" to bring the scores level at 2–2 before, with two minutes remaining, Lovett ran through the midfield unchecked. His shot hit the post and rebounded to Clive Clark who passed to the unmarked Jeff Astle to score and put Albion through to the next round. After defeating Portsmouth in Round Five, Albion had a long drawn-out tie against Liverpool which went to a second replay, before defeating local rivals Birmingham City in the semi-final to set up a final at Wembley against Everton.

In the final, played on 18 May 1968, Lovett was selected at outside right and had an early opportunity to score but was too slow to make the most of his chance. There was no score until Astle scored the only goal of the match in the first half of extra time, enabling Albion to win the cup for the fifth time.

Following their victory in the FA Cup, Albion entered the Cup Winners' Cup where they were drawn against Dinamo Bucharest in the second round. After a 1–1 draw in the first leg, Albion defeated their Romanian opponents 4–0 at The Hawthorns, with Lovett opening the scoring in the 35th minute. In the next round, they were defeated 1–0 by Scottish side, Dunfermline Athletic.

By the end of the 1968–69 season, Lovett had become an established fixture in the Albion side. On 31 May 1969, following an international tournament in Palo Alto, California, Lovett was driving home from the airport when a bus, which had rounded a corner on the wrong side of the road in Quinton, collided with his car. In the accident, Lovett broke his thighbone, suffered a collapsed lung and broken ribs. As a result of the accident, Lovett was out of action for nearly two years and was never to successfully return to first-team football. In 1973, in Birmingham Crown Court, he was awarded £14,000 damages against the West Midlands Transport Executive.

In an attempt to rebuild his career, he was loaned to Southampton for a month in November 1971 with a view to a possible permanent transfer. Lovett made three appearances for Southampton, replacing Bobby Stokes; the first was in a 2–1 victory over Leeds United, followed by an 8–0 defeat at Everton (equalling Southampton's largest loss) and a 5–2 defeat by Manchester United. Lovett's trial was not considered a success by the Southampton management and he returned to West Bromwich Albion.

Lovett was released from his contract in 1972 and played non-league football—for Worcester City and Solihull Borough—before retiring completely.

== Later life ==
On retiring from football, he worked in advertising for the Express & Star newspaper in the West Midlands before emigrating to southern Spain. He later settled in Thailand. In March 2008, he flew to England to join in the celebrations of the 40th anniversary of the FA Cup victory.

In 2017 he settled back in England with his wife Kate and after a short illness died on 10 May 2018, aged 70. At West Bromwich Albion's home match against Queens Park Rangers in August 2018, Lovett's family were presented with a special cap commemorating his service to the club.

== Honours ==
West Bromwich Albion

- FA Cup: 1967–68
- Football League Cup: 1965–66
