= List of West Bromwich Albion F.C. players =

This is a list of notable footballers who have played for West Bromwich Albion. The aim is for this list to include all players that have played 100 or more senior matches for the club. Other players who have played an important role for the club can also be included, but the reason for their notability should be included in the 'Notes' column.

For a list of all West Brom players with a Wikipedia article, see, and for the current squad see the main West Bromwich Albion F.C. article.

== Explanation of List ==
Players should be listed in chronological order according to the year in which they first played for the club, and then by alphabetical order of their surname. Appearances and goals should include substitute appearances, but exclude wartime matches. Further information on competitions/seasons which are regarded as eligible for appearance stats are provided below, and if a player's data is not available for any of these competitions an appropriate note should be added to the table.

=== League appearances ===
League appearances and goals should include data for the following league spells, but should not include test or play-off matches:

- Football League / Premier League: 1888–89 to present

=== Total appearances ===
The figures for total appearances and goals should include the League figures together with the following competitions:

- Football League test matches (1895–96) and play-off matches (1992–93, 2000–01, 2006–07)
- FA Cup; Charity Shield (1919–20, 1931–32, 1954–55, 1968–69)
- Football League Cup (from 1965 to 1966); Full Members Cup (1985–86 to 1990–91); Football League Trophy (1991–92, 1992–93)
- Fairs Cup (1966–67), UEFA Cup (1978–79, 1979–80, 1981–82); UEFA Cup Winners' Cup (1968–69)
- Anglo-Italian Cup (1969–70, 1970–71, 1993–94, 1995–96); Texaco Cup (1970–71, 1972–73, 1974–75); Anglo-Scottish Cup (1975–76, 1976–77)
- Watney Cup (1971–72); Tennent Caledonian Cup (1977–78, 1978–79)

== Table ==
Statistics last updated on 27 August 2026. Name in bold are currently active at the club

Name	Position	West Brom career	League apps	League goals	Total apps	Total goals	Notes
Billy Bassett	MF	1886–1899	261	61	311	77	
Tom Pearson	FW	1886–1894	138	72	?	?	
Roddy McLeod	FW	1891–1897	149	50	?	?	
Jesse Pennington	DF	1903–1922	455	0	496	0	
Sammy Timmins	MF	1906–1911	111	3	116	3	
Fred Reed	MF	1914–1927	138	4	154	5	
W.G. Richardson	FW	1929–1945	320	202	354	228	Most WBA goals in a season (40)
Ray Barlow	DF	1944–1960	403	31	482	48	
Len Millard	DF	1946—1958	436	7	476	9	
Ronnie Allen	FW	1950–1961	415	208	458	234	
Stuart Williams	DF	1950–1962	226	0	?	?	
Don Howe	DF	1952–1964	342	17	379	19	
Ray Potter	GK	1958–1967	217	0	?	?	
Tony Brown	MF	1963–1980	574	218	720	279	Record WBA appearances and record goalscorer
Jeff Astle	FW	1964—1974	292	137	361	174	
John Osborne	GK	1967–1972, 1973–1978	250	0	312	0	
Allan Glover	FW/MF	1969–1977	92	9	107	10	
John Wile	DF	1970–1983	500	24	619	29	
Willie Johnston	MF	1972–1979	207	18	261	28	
Bryan Robson	MF	1974–1981	198	39	249	46	
Derek Statham	DF	1976–1987	299	8	373	11	
Laurie Cunningham	MF	1977–1979	86	21	114	30	
Cyrille Regis	FW	1977–1984	237	82	302	112	
Bob Taylor	FW	1992–1998, 2000–2003	324	113	377	131	
Lee Hughes	FW	1997–2001, 2002–2004	211	89	237	98	
Larus Sigurdsson	DF	1999–2004	116	1	128	1	
Neil Clement	DF	2000–2010	264	21	300	26	
Derek McInnes	MF	2000–2003	88	6	100	6	
Jason Roberts	FW	2000–2004	89	24	101	27	
Scott Dobie	FW	2001–2004	110	21	127	25	
Russell Hoult	GK	2001–2007	190	0	213	0	
Andy Johnson	MF	2001–2006	132	7	144	8	
Darren Moore	DF	2001–2006	104	6	116	6	
Jason Koumas	MF	2002–2005, 2006–2007	123	23	141	23	
Paul Robinson	DF	2003–2010	214	4	238	5	
Martin Albrechtsen	DF	2004–2008	118	4	138	4	
Zoltán Gera	MF	2004–2008, 2011–2014	169	25	191	29	
Jonathan Greening	MF	2004–2009	199	7	225	8	
Roman Bednar	FW	2007–2012	86	30	105	34	
Chris Brunt	MF	2007–2020	382	45	421	49	
James Morrison	MF	2007–2019	309	34	341	39	
Robert Koren	MF	2007–2010	127	16	149	22	
Youssouf Mulumbu	MF	2008–2015	197	15	211	15	
Scott Carson	GK	2008–2011	110	0	118	0	
Peter Odemwingie	FW	2010–2013	80	30	82	31	First player in West Brom's Premier League history to score in four consecutive games
Craig Dawson	DF	2010–2019	194	14	225	15	
Ben Foster	GK	2011–2018	209	0	223	0	
Saido Berahino	FW	2012–2017	105	23	121	36	
Claudio Yacob	MF	2012–2018	160	1	171	2	
Salomón Rondón	FW	2015–2018	108	24	120	28	
Matt Phillips	MF	2016–2024	238	28	255	31	
Hal Robson-Kanu	FW	2016–2021	143	21	154	24	
Jake Livermore	MF	2017–2023	206	8	216	9	
Ahmed Hegazi	DF	2017–2020	93	4	104	4	
Kieran Gibbs	DF	2017–2021	93	5	100	5	
Kyle Bartley	DF	2018–2025	215	14	232	15	
Sam Johnstone	GK	2018–2022	165	0	167	0	
Dara O'Shea	DF	2018–2023	96	7	107	7	
**Conor Townsend**	DF	2018–2024; 2026–	195	3	213	4	
Grady Diangana	MF	2019–2025	192	26	202	26	
Semi Ajayi	DF	2019–2025	170	12	177	13	
Darnell Furlong	DF	2019–2025	235	11	244	11	
Karlan Grant	FW	2020–2023; 2024–2026	166	33	174	35	
Okay Yokuşlu	MF	2021; 2022–2024	100	5	107	5	
Alex Mowatt	MF	2021–2026	160	14	170	14	
**Jayson Molumby**	MF	2021–	146	10	156	10	
John Swift	MF	2022–2025	118	18	126	19	
Jed Wallace	MF	2022–2026	140	15	150	16	
