= 1970 Football League Cup final =

- Event: 1969–70 Football League Cup
Manchester City	West Bromwich Albion
2	1
- After extra time
- Date: 7 March 1970
- Venue: Wembley Stadium, London
- Referee: V James (York)
- Attendance: 97,963

The 1970 Football League Cup final took place on 7 March 1970 at Wembley Stadium with an attendance of 97,963. It was the tenth Football League Cup final and the fourth to be played at Wembley. It was contested between Manchester City and West Bromwich Albion, with City winning their first of the two trophies that season; on 29 April they would win the 1970 European Cup Winners' Cup final against Górnik Zabrze 2–1.

The pitch had been criticised by Joe Mercer as a "pig of a pitch" due to recent snowfall and rain. In muddy pitch conditions, Jeff Astle opened the scoring for Albion with a header after five minutes, becoming the first player to score in the final of both the League Cup and FA Cup at Wembley. He had already scored in the first leg of the 1966 League Cup final four years previously, however that was at West Ham's Boleyn Ground. City equalised from a low shot to the left corner by Mike Doyle to send the game into extra time, and eventually won 2–1, with Glyn Pardoe scoring the winner when he volleyed the ball into the net from close range.

The Cup was presented by FIFA president Sir Stanley Rous.

== Players and officials ==
7 March 1970

Manchester City	2–1 (a.e.t.)	West Bromwich Albion
Doyle 60'; Pardoe 102'		Astle 5'

Wembley Stadium, London
Attendance: 97,963
Referee: V James (York)

Manchester City	West Bromwich Albion

1	(England) Joe Corrigan
2	(England) Tony Book (c)
3	(Scotland) Arthur Mann
4	(England) Mike Doyle
5	(England) Tommy Booth
6	(England) Alan Oakes
7	(England) George Heslop
8	(England) Colin Bell
9	(England) Mike Summerbee	Substituted off
10	(England) Francis Lee
11	(England) Glyn Pardoe
Substitute:
12	(England) Ian Bowyer	Substituted on
Manager:
(England) Joe Mercer

1	(England) John Osborne
2	(Scotland) Doug Fraser (c)
3	(Scotland) Ray Wilson
4	(England) Tony Brown
5	(England) John Talbut
6	(England) John Kaye
7	(England) Len Cantello
8	(England) Colin Suggett
9	(England) Jeff Astle
10	(Scotland) Asa Hartford	Substituted off
11	(Scotland) Bobby Hope
Substitute:
12	(Wales) Dick Krzywicki	Substituted on
Manager:
(England) Alan Ashman

== Background ==
Honours were shared in the league matches between the two sides during the 1969–70 league season, with Manchester City gaining a 2–1 victory at Maine Road and West Bromwich Albion winning 3–0 at The Hawthorns. City went on to achieve a 10th-place finish in the First Division, while Albion finished 16th. The only previous meeting between the two sides in the League Cup had taken place at the third round stage of the 1966–67 competition; on that occasion, Albion progressed by a 4–2 scoreline and went on to reach that season's final.
