= Bobby Hope =

Scottish footballer and manager (1943–2022)

Personal information
- Full name: Robert Hope
- Date of birth: 28 September 1943
- Place of birth: Bridge of Allan, Stirlingshire, Scotland
- Date of death: 10 June 2022 (aged 78)
- Position: Inside forward

Youth career
- 1959–1960: West Bromwich Albion

Senior career*
Years	Team	Apps	(Gls)
1960–1972	West Bromwich Albion	336	(33)
1972–1976	Birmingham City	34	(5)
1975	→ Philadelphia Atoms (loan)	20	(4)
1976	→ Dallas Tornado (loan)	22	(3)
1976–1979	Sheffield Wednesday	42	(7)
1977	→ Dallas Tornado (loan)	18	(0)
1978	→ Dallas Tornado (loan)	18	(0)
1979–1983	Bromsgrove Rovers	2	(2)
Total		492	(54)

International career
1966–1968	Scotland U23	2	(0)
1967–1968	Scotland	7	(1)

Managerial career
- 1983–1988: Bromsgrove Rovers
- 1988: Burton Albion
- 1989–1994: Bromsgrove Rovers
- * Club domestic league appearances and goals

Robert Hope (28 September 1943 – 10 June 2022) was a Scottish footballer who made more than 400 appearances as a midfielder in the Football League. He spent most of his club career at West Bromwich Albion, where he played more than 300 league games and helped the club win two major trophies. He won seven caps for Scotland.

== Career ==
Born in Bridge of Allan, Stirlingshire, Hope played for West Bromwich Albion between 1959 and 1972, when they were a Football League First Division side. A cultured, scheming inside-forward, he was the general in the team's midfield throughout the 1960s. Together with Clive Clark on the wing, Hope provided the ammunition for players like Tony Brown and Jeff Astle. Hope enjoyed success during this period, winning the League Cup in 1966 and FA Cup in 1968. He scored Albion's first goal in European competition when he found the net against DOS Utrecht in the Inter-Cities Fairs Cup on 2 November 1966.

In April 1971, Hope was awarded a testimonial match against Athletic Bilbao, then managed by Ronnie Allen, who later had two short spells as Albion manager; the fixture was reciprocated in Spain a few weeks later for the benefit of José Ángel Iribar. He moved to Birmingham City in 1972, spending time on loan in the NASL with Philadelphia Atoms and Dallas Tornado, and later played for Sheffield Wednesday and Bromsgrove Rovers. He went on to manage Bromsgrove and Burton Albion. He returned to West Brom as a scout in later years, and was appointed chief scout in 2000.

Hope made seven appearances for the Scotland national team. Five of these appearances were during a 1967 overseas tour that the Scottish Football Association decided in October 2021 to reclassify as full internationals, which increased Hope's cap tally from two to seven.

West Brom announced on 11 June that he had died on 10 June 2022, aged 78.

== Honours ==
West Bromwich Albion

- FA Cup: 1967–68
- Football League Cup: 1965–66; runner-up: 1966–67, 1969–70

Bromsgrove Rangers

- Southern League Premier Division: 1991–92
- Southern League Midland Division: 1985–86
- Southern League Cup: 1985–86
- Worcestershire Cup: 1986–87, 1991–92, 1993–94
