= Danny Campbell (footballer, born 1944) =

English footballer (1944–2020)

Personal information
- Full name: Daniel Campbell
- Date of birth: 3 February 1944
- Place of birth: Oldham, England
- Date of death: 15 August 2020 (aged 76)
- Place of death: South Africa
- Position: Defender

Senior career*
| Years | Team | Apps | (Gls) |
| 1959–1965 | Droylsden | | |
| 1965–1968 | West Bromwich Albion | 8 | (0) |
| 1967 | → Los Angeles Wolves (loan) | 32 | (1) |
| 1968–1970 | Stockport County | 31 | (3) |
| 1970–1971 | Bradford Park Avenue | 10 | (1) |
| 1971–1974 | Port Elizabeth City | | |
- * Club domestic league appearances and goals

Daniel Campbell (3 February 1944 – 16 August 2020) was an English footballer who played for Bradford Park Avenue, Stockport County and West Bromwich Albion.

While at West Brom, Campbell was an understudy first to Stan Jones and later to John Talbut. He made his debut in the first leg of the 1966 Football League Cup final against West Ham United, when Jones was injured. Albion lost that match by 2 goals to 1, but won the second leg (in which Campbell also played) 4–1, to win 5–3 on aggregate. He also played in four League games in March and April 1966, before Jones' return; three of them were away from home, and Albion failed to win any of them - drawing two and losing two.

Campbell died in South Africa on 16 August 2020 at the age of 76, due to a pulmonary embolism caused by COVID-19. Coincidentally, John Talbut had died on the previous day.

== Honours ==
West Bromwich Albion

- Football League Cup: 1965–66
