= Tony Brown (footballer, born 1945) =

English footballer (born 1945)

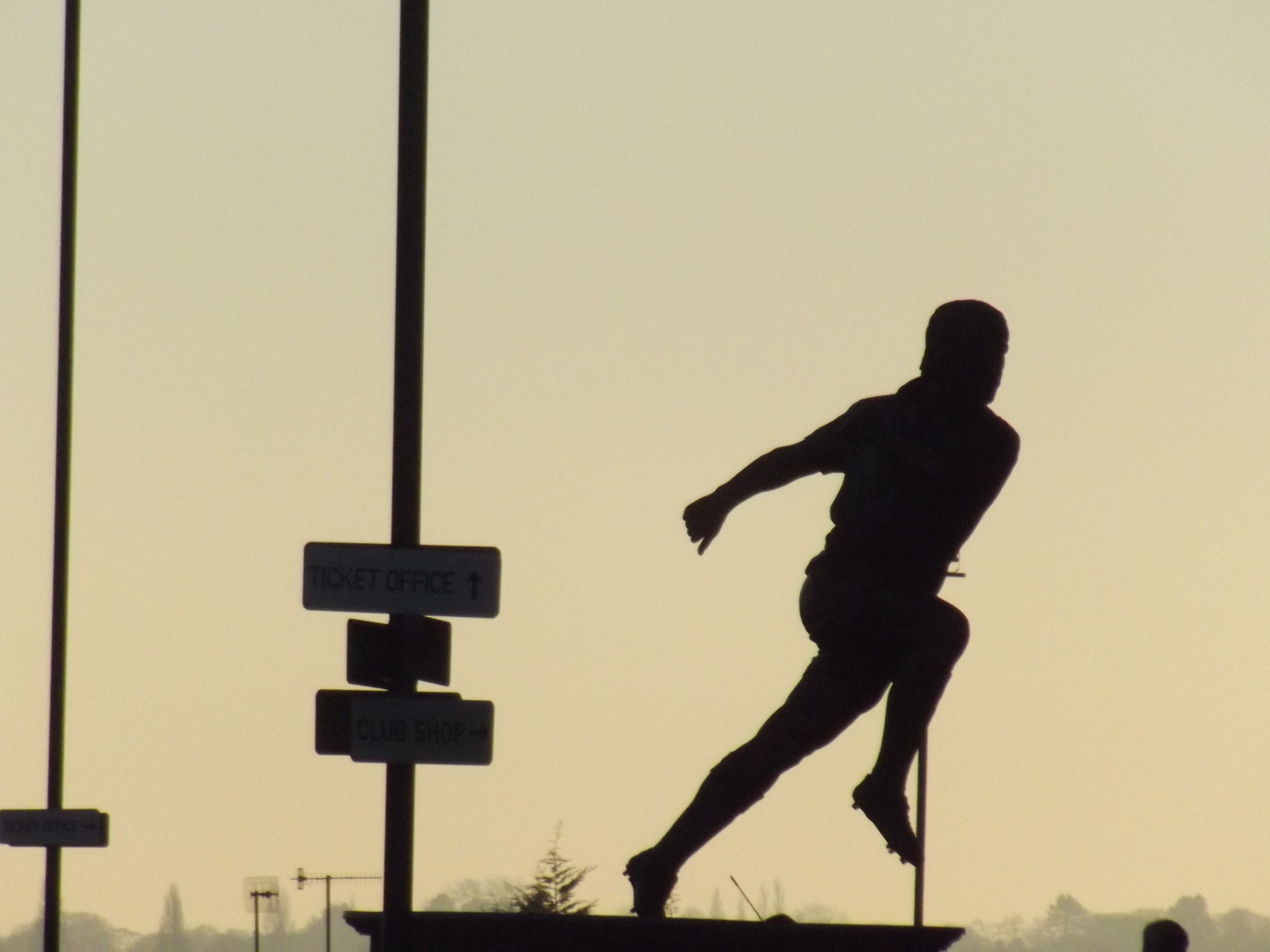
- Statue of Brown at The Hawthorns

Personal information
- Full name: Anthony Brown
- Date of birth: 3 October 1945 (age 81)
- Place of birth: Oldham, Lancashire, England
- Positions: Wing half; inside forward

Youth career
- 1961–1963: West Bromwich Albion

Senior career*
Years	Team	Apps	(Gls)
1963–1980	West Bromwich Albion	574	(218)
1980	New England Tea Men	31	(8)
1981	Jacksonville Tea Men	32	(9)
1981	West Bromwich Albion	0	(0)
1981–1983	Torquay United	45	(11)
1983	Stafford Rangers	10	(3)
Total		692	(249)

International career
1971	England	1	(0)
- * Club domestic league appearances and goals

Anthony Brown (born 3 October 1945) is an English former footballer who played as a wing half and an inside forward. He was often referred to by his nickname Bomber or Bomber Brown and was known for his spectacular goals.

He joined West Bromwich Albion as a youth in 1961 and turned professional in 1963. In the late 1960s and early 1970s Brown was part of an Albion team that built a reputation as a successful cup side, winning the 1966 Football League Cup Final and the 1968 FA Cup Final and finishing as runners-up in the League Cup in 1967 and 1970. He was the top scorer in Division One in 1970–71 and received his only England cap at the end of that season.

After relegation in 1973, he helped Albion to win promotion back to Division One in 1976. He scored 279 goals in 720 competitive games for Albion, both club records. Brown finished his playing career playing for the New England Tea Men, Torquay United and non-league Stafford Rangers. Since retiring from playing he has worked as a coach and a commentator.

== Early life ==
One of three siblings, Brown moved at an early age from his birthplace Oldham, Lancashire to Wythenshawe, Manchester. He was a keen Manchester United supporter as a boy, but his football idol was Manchester City striker Denis Law, who later signed for United just as Brown was beginning his own career as a footballer. Brown represented the South Manchester Boys team, before progressing to play for Manchester Boys and then the Lancashire County team. He suffered from asthma from three months old until the age of fourteen, but nonetheless had ambitions to play football. As he later said, "I'd always wanted to be a professional footballer; that's all I'd ever dreamed of doing." As a 15-year-old, he had agreed to sign for Manchester City when West Bromwich Albion's Manchester-based scout John Shaw persuaded Brown to take a trial at Albion. Brown responded by scoring a hat-trick in a practice match and some years later reflected:

The very first time I stepped foot inside the Hawthorns as a 15-year-old schoolboy, I knew this was the club for me. At the time I was on the verge of signing for Manchester City, who were my local club, but I felt so instantly at home with Albion that I decided to sign for them instead. It was the best decision I've ever made in my life.

== Playing career ==
=== West Bromwich Albion ===
Brown joined West Bromwich Albion as an apprentice professional on 13 April 1961, earning a wage of £6 a week. After two seasons playing youth football, he made his reserve team debut in the final Central League game of 1962–63, scoring in a 3–2 defeat to Manchester United reserves. He turned professional on 27 September 1963 and was immediately called up to the first team squad for the away match at Ipswich Town the following day. Eddie Readfern was unable to participate in the game due to illness, which meant that Brown was given his league debut, just a few days before his 18th birthday; his equalising goal helped Albion to a 2–1 away win. Readfern was recalled for the next game however, meaning that Brown immediately returned to the reserves, although Brown did return to the first team in mid-October, when he scored on his home debut which Albion went on to win 4–3 against Aston Villa. He was selected sporadically by Albion manager Jimmy Hagan during the remainder of 1963–64 and finished the campaign on five goals in thirteen appearances. In the latter part of the season he missed four league games when he was called up to the England Youth squad for the UEFA European Youth Tournament in the Netherlands. England won the competition but Brown was not selected for any of the games. Brown became a regular first team player during the early part of the 1964–65 campaign, appearing in Albion's first 12 league games of the season. During this period he scored six goals, including his first professional hat-trick, which came in a 4–1 win against Sunderland. However he lost his place shortly after the signing of Jeff Astle and played just five more games that season. A desire to play first team football led him to submit a transfer request, which Jimmy Hagan turned down, but Brown continued his scoring run in the reserve team, hitting 22 goals in 20 games.

At the start of the 1965–66 season, Brown was still playing in the reserves, but an injury to Clive Clark in September 1965 gave him the opportunity to reclaim his first team place. Brown scored against Everton on his return and remained a regular in the side for the rest of the season, scoring 17 goals in 35 league games. His tally in the league was just short of teammates John Kaye and Jeff Astle, who each scored 18 times, but Brown finished as the club's top scorer overall—with 27 goals—due to his goals in the Football League Cup. Albion were taking part in the competition for the first time, after the FA offered the winners a place in the Inter-Cities Fairs Cup. Brown became the first player to score in every round of the League Cup,^{[A]} including a hat-trick in the semi-final, second leg against Peterborough United. In the final, Brown's goal helped his team to a 4–1 second leg victory over West Ham United. Albion won 5–3 on aggregate to take the trophy and secure Brown his first major honour. He has since said of the game:

I've always said that the second leg of the League Cup Final against West Ham was the best performance I've seen from an Albion side. That was the best team performance that I ever played in as well ... We went out and from the first second we absolutely destroyed them.

Brown missed two months of the following season due to a back injury. He made his return in the second leg of the Inter-Cities Fairs Cup against DOS Utrecht, when he took—and scored—his first penalty kick in senior football; he went on to become Albion's regular penalty taker, scoring 51 of 61 spot-kicks during his time at the club. He scored twice more in the Utrecht match and as of September 2021 remains the only Albion player to have scored a hat-trick in a European competition. Albion again reached the League Cup Final, which was played at Wembley for the first time. This time however, Brown was on the losing side as Albion lost 3–2 to Third Division Queens Park Rangers, having led 2–0 at half-time. In May 1968 he won an FA Cup winners medal as Albion beat Everton 1–0 after extra time. He played in the 1970 League Cup Final, where he picked up his second runners-up tankard as Albion lost 2–1 to Manchester City. In 1970–71 Brown was the leading scorer in Division One with 28 goals.

He remained at Albion after their relegation to Division Two at the end of 1972–73. A testimonial match was staged for Brown at the Hawthorns on 6 May 1974, an Albion / Aston Villa side taking on a Wolves / Birmingham side. He played a major role in Albion's return to the top flight in 1976, scoring the goal that clinched promotion in a 1–0 win away at his home town club Oldham Athletic. In 1977–78, he played in the FA Cup semi-final against Ipswich at Highbury. He scored a penalty but Albion lost the match 3–1 and Brown called it "the worst day of my life".

=== Later career ===
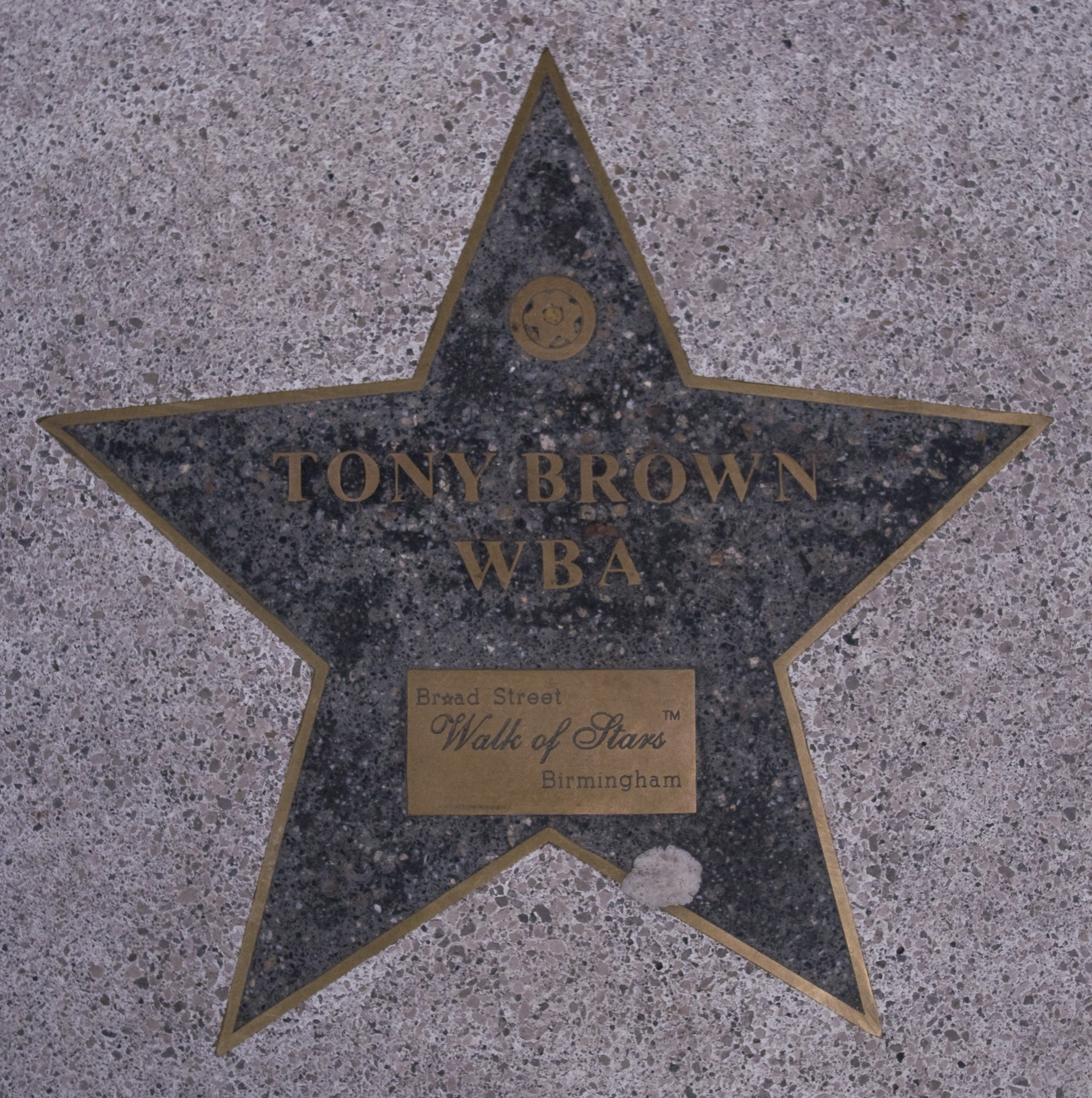
Brown is honoured in the Birmingham Walk of Stars on Broad Street, Birmingham.

Brown remained at the Hawthorns until the summer of 1980 when he moved to the United States to join the New England Tea Men. As well as Albion's two cup triumphs of the 1960s, he had also played a part in their re-emergence as a leading First Division side in the late 1970s, which saw them peak with a third place league finish and run to the UEFA Cup quarter-finals in the 1978-79 season.

In 17 years at the Hawthorns, Brown had broken both the appearance and goalscoring records for the Baggies, scoring 218 goals in 574 league games. Both of these records remain intact nearly 40 years later.

He returned to the UK after the 1981 NASL season, playing once for the West Bromwich Albion reserve side in September 1981.

On 8 October 1981, the Torquay United managerial team of Frank O'Farrell and Bruce Rioch persuaded Brown to join Torquay, with a second testimonial staged in his honour on 7 December 1981 when Torquay faced Manchester United at Plainmoor. Brown lived up to his reputation with 11 goals in 45 league appearances for Torquay before moving to non-league Stafford Rangers in 1983.

=== International career ===
Brown played for the young England side in April 1969 against the full England side. He earned his only full England cap on 19 May 1971, playing in a goalless draw against Wales at Wembley.

== Post playing career and legacy ==
He later coached at Birmingham City (in the 1987–88 season he was assistant to Garry Pendrey) and West Bromwich Albion. Brown is currently a football expert summariser for BBC Radio WM on West Bromwich Albion matches.

Brown was named as one of West Bromwich Albion's 16 greatest players in a poll organised as part of the club's 125th anniversary celebrations in 2004. In July 2007 he was voted into the PFA Centenary Hall of Fame, then in 2009 he was awarded a place in the Birmingham Walk of Stars, winning the West Bromwich Albion vote. Brown was given the Freedom of the Borough of Sandwell live on air on Beacon Radio and Mercia by the head of Sandwell Council in May 2010. West Bromwich Albion unveiled a statue of Tony Brown at the East Stand of the Hawthorns Stadium on 6 November 2014. Brown's boyhood hero Denis Law was present at the unveiling ceremony along with several Albion players past and present.

== Personal life ==
In July 1969 he married Irene, with whom he had two children: Paul was born in 1977 and Adam in 1981. Brown's best man was his Albion teammate Jeff Astle.

== Honours ==
West Bromwich Albion

- FA Cup: 1967–68
- Football League Cup: 1965–66; runner-up: 1966–67, 1969–70

Individual

- Football League First Division top scorer: 1970–71
- Midlands Footballer of the Year: 1969, 1971, 1979

== Footnotes ==
A. This does not include the first round of the competition: Albion, as a First Division team, entered at the second round stage.
