= John Talbut =

English footballer (1940–2020)

- Talbut with KV Mechelen in 1974

Personal information
- Date of birth: 20 October 1940
- Place of birth: Headington, Oxford, England
- Date of death: 14 August 2020 (aged 79)
- Position: Centre half

Youth career
- Burnley

Senior career*
Years	Team	Apps	(Gls)
1957–1966	Burnley	138	(0)
1966–1971	West Bromwich Albion	144	(0)
1971–1976	KV Mechelen	148	(6)
Total		430	(6)

International career
	England U23	7	(0)

Managerial career
- KV Mechelen
- * Club domestic league appearances and goals

John Talbut (20 October 1940 – 14 August 2020) was an English football centre half.

Talbut initially made his name with Burnley, where he came out of the club's youth system and established himself as a first-team regular, also appearing for the England under-23 team whilst at the club. In December 1966 Jimmy Hagan paid £30,000 to take Talbut to West Bromwich Albion and he soon replaced veteran Stan Jones at the heart of Albion's defence. Talbut was a winner with the Baggies in the 1968 FA Cup Final but also featured on the losing side in the 1970 Football League Cup Final. He never scored a league goal for the club but did find the net once against A.S. Roma in the Anglo-Italian Cup in 1970.

Although a strong presence in the air Talbut was at times found wanting on the ground and the arrival of John Wile in late 1970 left him surplus to requirements at the Albion. No longer able to gain a first team spot he left Albion in the 1971 close season to take up the position of player-manager with Belgian second division club KV Mechelen.

Talbut died on 14 August 2020, at the age of 79, due to complications from dementia.

== Honours ==
West Bromwich Albion

- FA Cup: 1967–68
- Football League Cup runner-up: 1969–70
