= Graham Williams (footballer, born 1938) =

Welsh footballer

Personal information
- Full name: Graham Evan Williams
- Date of birth: 2 April 1938 (age 88)
- Place of birth: Henllan, Denbighshire, Wales
- Position: Full back

Senior career*
Years	Team	Apps	(Gls)
1955–1972	West Bromwich Albion	314	(10)
1972–1975	Weymouth		

International career
1960–1968	Wales	26	(1)

Managerial career
- 1972–1975: Weymouth
- 1981–1982: Cardiff City
- 1987–1989: RoPS
- 1991: RoPS
- 1995: RoPS
- * Club domestic league appearances and goals

Graham Evan Williams (born 2 April 1938) is a Welsh former footballer who played as a full back. He spent his entire 17-year professional career at West Bromwich Albion.

== Biography ==
Williams was born in Henllan, Denbighshire. He joined West Bromwich Albion as an amateur in September 1954 and turned professional in April 1955. In December 1963 he was involved in a WBA players' strike. He captained the side to victory in the 1966 Football League Cup Final and 1968 FA Cup Final, scoring in the second leg of the 1966 final against West Ham United. He also won 26 caps for Wales.

After leaving Albion in 1972 he took up the post of player-manager with Weymouth, with whom he remained until 1975. In November 1981, he was appointed chief coach of Cardiff City, taking over from Richie Morgan, who moved to a general manager's role. After a disastrous run of nine losses in fifteen games, both Williams and Morgan were sacked in February 1982, with Len Ashurst taking over at Ninian Park. Williams took several coaching jobs abroad including steering Finnish team RoPS to the quarter finals of the European Cup Winners' Cup. Later on in his career he served as the assistant manager of the Welsh national side under Bobby Gould, and held a scouting role at Cheltenham Town while Bobby Gould was manager of the team.

Following his coaching career and scouting for Cheltenham he went in to scouting of academy players for Newcastle, Chelsea and Tottenham Hotspur before retiring in 2019

== Honours ==
West Bromwich Albion

- FA Cup: 1967–68
- Football League Cup: 1965–66; runner-up: 1966–67

Individual

- In 2024 a suite at WBA's ground, the Hawthorns, was named in his honour.
