= 1966 Football League Cup final =

- Event: 1965–66 Football League Cup
West Ham United	West Bromwich Albion
3	5
- on aggregate

First leg
West Ham United	West Bromwich Albion
2	1
- Date: 9 March 1966
- Venue: Boleyn Ground, London
- Referee: D Smith

Second leg
West Bromwich Albion	West Ham United
4	1
- Date: 23 March 1966
- Venue: The Hawthorns, West Bromwich
- Referee: J Mitchell

The 1966 Football League Cup final, the sixth Football League Cup final to be staged since the competition's inception, was contested between West Bromwich Albion and West Ham United. It was the last to be played over two legs, with West Brom winning 5–3 on aggregate.

West Ham won the first leg 2–1 at the Boleyn Ground, with West Ham's goals coming from Bobby Moore and Johnny Byrne, with Jeff Astle scoring for West Brom. However, Albion won the second leg 4–1 at The Hawthorns. In the second leg West Brom's goals were scored by Graham Williams, Clive Clark, Tony Brown and John Kaye. Martin Peters with West Ham's consolation.

== Match details ==
=== First leg ===
West Ham United	2–1 (final score after 90 minutes)	West Bromwich Albion
Manager: (England) Ron Greenwood Team: (England) Jim Standen (GK) (England) Dennis Burnett (England) Jack Burkett (England) Martin Peters (England) Ken Brown (England) Bobby Moore (c) (England) Peter Brabrook (England) Ron Boyce (England) Johnny Byrne (England) Geoff Hurst (England) Brian Dear; Scorers: Johnny Byrne; Bobby Moore	Half-time: 0–0 Competition: Football League Cup (Final First Leg) Date: 9 March 1966 Venue: Boleyn Ground, London Attendance: 28,341 Referee: D Smith	Manager: (England) Jimmy Hagan Team: (England) Ray Potter (GK) (England) Bobby Cram (England) Ray Fairfax (Scotland) Doug Fraser (England) Danny Campbell (Wales) Graham Williams (c) (England) Tony Brown (England) Jeff Astle (England) John Kaye (England) Graham Lovett (England) Clive Clark; Scorers: Jeff Astle

=== Second leg ===
West Bromwich Albion	4–1 (final score after 90 minutes); Agg: 5–3	West Ham United
Manager: (England) Jimmy Hagan Team: (England) Ray Potter (GK) (England) Bobby Cram (England) Ray Fairfax (Scotland) Doug Fraser (England) Danny Campbell (Wales) Graham Williams (c) (England) Tony Brown (England) Jeff Astle (England) John Kaye (Scotland) Bobby Hope (England) Clive Clark; Scorers: Tony Brown; Clive Clark; John Kaye; Graham Williams	Half-time: 4–0 Competition: Football League Cup (Final Second Leg) Date: 23 March 1966 Venue: The Hawthorns, West Bromwich Attendance: 31,925 Referee: J Mitchell	Manager: (England) Ron Greenwood Team: (England) Jim Standen (GK) (England) Dennis Burnett (England) Eddie Bovington (England) Martin Peters (England) Ken Brown (England) Bobby Moore (c) (England) Peter Brabrook (England) Ron Boyce (England) Johnny Byrne (England) Geoff Hurst (England) Johnny Sissons; Scorers: Martin Peters

== Route to the final ==
Home teams listed first.

=== West Ham United ===
Round 2: Bristol Rovers 3-3 West Ham United

Replay West Ham United 3–2 Bristol Rovers

Round 3: West Ham United 4-0 Mansfield Town

Round 4: Rotherham United 1-2 West Ham United

Quarter final: Grimsby Town 2-2 West Ham United

Replay West Ham United 1–0 Grimsby Town

Semi final, 1st leg: West Ham United 5-2 Cardiff City

Semi final, 2nd leg: Cardiff City 1-5 West Ham United

West Ham United won 10–3 on aggregate

=== West Bromwich Albion ===
Round 2: West Bromwich Albion 3-1 Walsall

Round 3: Leeds United 2-4 West Bromwich Albion

Round 4: Coventry City 1-1 West Bromwich Albion

Replay West Bromwich Albion 6–1 Coventry City

Quarter final: West Bromwich Albion 3-1 Aston Villa

Semi final, 1st leg: West Bromwich Albion 2-1 Peterborough United

Semi final, 2nd leg: Peterborough United 2-4 West Bromwich Albion

West Bromwich Albion won 6–3 on aggregate
