= Bomber Brown =

Bomber Brown is a nickname regularly used in reference to two former footballers from the British Isles.

- Tony Brown (footballer, born 1945) – West Bromwich Albion
- John Brown (footballer, born 1962) – Rangers
