= 1968 FA Cup final =

- Event: 1967–68 FA Cup
West Bromwich Albion	Everton
1	0
- After extra time
- Date: 18 May 1968
- Venue: Wembley Stadium, London
- Referee: Leo Callaghan (Merthyr Tydfil)
- Attendance: 100,000

The 1968 FA Cup final was the 87th final of the FA Cup. It took place on 18 May 1968 at Wembley Stadium and was contested between West Bromwich Albion and Everton.

West Brom won 1–0 after extra time. Jeff Astle scored the winning goal, thus achieving the feat of scoring in every round of that season's competition. It was the fifth time that West Brom had won the FA Cup; they have not reached the final since.

This was the first FA Cup Final to be televised live on BBC2 in colour. Both teams wore their away strips, West Brom wearing white shirts and shorts with red socks, and Everton wearing gold shirts and blue shorts. This was also the first FA Cup Final in which a substitute was used, when West Brom's Dennis Clarke came on for an injured John Kaye.

The referee was Leo Callaghan from Merthyr Tydfil in South Wales.

== Background ==
Both clubs were members of the First Division, Everton having finished fifth during the 1967–68 league season and West Bromwich Albion eighth. Everton were victorious in both league matches between the two sides, winning 2–1 at Goodison Park and 6–2 at The Hawthorns. The teams had met on four previous occasions in the FA Cup. Everton had won three of those ties, including the 1906–07 semi-final, while Albion's sole victory was in the semi-final of 1930–31. Both teams were renowned for their attacking styles at the time so an exciting match was expected. Instead a tense rather drab affair ensued before Astle struck in extra time. Despite taking part in what was then a record 10th final Albion have failed since to win the competition or indeed reach the final.

Albion's journey to the final began at lower league Colchester United in Round 3. Albion took the game to a replay thanks to an equalising Tony Brown penalty, though they were second best for large periods. They had no problem in the replay however, winning 4–0 in front of near 40,000 at home. Round 4 saw Albion draw at home against Southampton before prevailing in a replay 3–2 at the Dell. Next came second Division Portsmouth in Round 5 at a packed Fratton Park. Albion triumphed thanks to goals from Astle and Clark though a Portsmouth goal made for a tense finish. Albion were then drawn at home against Bill Shankly's Liverpool side in the quarter-final. Demand for the game was huge with eager fans queuing for hours on end. However, despite being roared on by a crowd of 53,052, Albion's largest for six years, the Baggies could only manage a goalless draw, meaning a replay at Anfield, where Albion had been beaten 4–1 earlier in the league season. Albion went behind, but an Astle header took the game to yet another replay, this time at Maine Road. Despite it being a wet midweek night, a crowd of 56,000 watched the game, 20,000 of them Albion fans who had made the journey north. Despite being underdogs Albion won 2–1 with goals from Clark and Astle.

The semi-final saw Albion drawn against local rivals Birmingham City, who were chasing promotion from the second division at the time. The clubs had met in a final back in 1931, which Albion had won, and the match was staged at the neutral venue of Villa Park. In front of a crowd of over 60,000 goals from Brown and Astle saw Albion through to a record tenth final.

== Route to the final ==
=== West Bromwich Albion ===
R3 = Colchester United (A) 1-1 (16,981) R = Colchester United (H) 4-0 (40,448)

R4 = Southampton (H) 1-1 (30,987) R = Southampton (A) 3-2* (26,036)

R5 = Portsmouth (A) 2-1 (43,642)

R6 = Liverpool (H) 0-0 (53,062) R = Liverpool (A) 1-1* (54,273) R = Liverpool (Maine Road) 2-1 (56,189)

SF = Birmingham City (Villa Park) 2-0 (60,831)

=== Everton ===
R3 = Southport (A) 1-0 (18,795)

R4 = Carlisle United (A) 2-0 (25,000)

R5 = Tranmere Rovers (H) 2-0 (62,634)

R6 = Leicester City (A) 3-1 (43,519)

SF = Leeds United (Old Trafford) 1-0 (63,000)

== Match details ==
18 May 1968
15:00 BST

West Bromwich Albion	1–0 (a.e.t.)	Everton
Astle 93'	Report

Wembley, London
Attendance: 100,000
Referee: Leo Callaghan

West Bromwich Albion	Everton

GK	1	(England) John Osborne
RB	2	(Scotland) Doug Fraser
LB	3	(Wales) Graham Williams (c)
IF	4	(England) Tony Brown
CB	5	(England) John Talbut
CB	6	(England) John Kaye	Substituted off
MF	7	(England) Graham Lovett
OR	8	(England) Ian Collard
CF	9	(England) Jeff Astle
IF	10	(Scotland) Bobby Hope
OL	11	(England) Clive Clark
Substitute:
DF	12	(England) Dennis Clarke	Substituted in
Manager:
(England) Alan Ashman

GK	1	(England) Gordon West
RB	2	(England) Tommy Wright
LB	3	(England) Ray Wilson
CM	4	(England) Howard Kendall
CB	5	(England) Brian Labone (c)
CM	6	(England) Colin Harvey
RM	7	(England) Jimmy Husband
CM	8	(England) Alan Ball
CF	9	(England) Joe Royle
CB	10	(England) John Hurst
LM	11	(England) Johnny Morrissey
Substitute:
DF	12	(England) Roger Kenyon
Manager:
(England) Harry Catterick
