= Eddie Colquhoun =

Scottish footballer (1945–2023)

Personal information
- Full name: Edmund Peter Skirving Colquhoun
- Date of birth: 29 March 1945
- Place of birth: Prestonpans, Scotland
- Date of death: 16 April 2023 (aged 78)
- Height: 6 ft 0 in (1.83 m)
- Position: Centre back

Senior career*
Years	Team	Apps	(Gls)
1962–1967	Bury	81	(2)
1967–1968	West Bromwich Albion	46	(1)
1968–1978	Sheffield United	363	(21)
1978–1980	Detroit Express	69	(4)
1979–1980	Detroit Express (indoor)	11	(1)
1981	Washington Diplomats	9	(0)
Total		490	(24)

International career
1967–1973	Scotland	11	(0)
- * Club domestic league appearances and goals

Edmund Peter Skirving Colquhoun (/kəˈhuːn/; 29 March 1945 – 16 April 2023) was a Scottish footballer who played as a centre back for Sheffield United and Scotland.

Known to players and fans as Eddie Colquhoun, he started his professional football career with Bury in 1962. He made 81 league appearances and scored twice for them. He moved on to West Bromwich Albion in 1967. During his time at the club West Brom won the 1967-68 FA Cup but Colquhoun missed the final against Everton through injury.

In 1968, Sheffield United had just been relegated to the Second Division. Their manager at the time was Arthur Rowley, and he signed Colquhoun from West Brom for £27,500.

Colquhoun made his debut for Sheffield United against Huddersfield Town on 19 October 1968. Colquhoun was uncompromising, hard tackling and a leader in his play, and was instantly made team captain for his home debut at Bramall Lane against Charlton Athletic on 26 October 1968, in a match United won 2–0. The following week, he scored his first Sheffield United goal against Portsmouth at Fratton Park on 2 November.

Colquhoun proved to be an excellent signing and was an integral part of the Sheffield United side which won promotion to the First Division in season 1970–71. He made a total of 416 appearances (363 league) with 21 goals (21 league) in all competitions for Sheffield United between 1968 and 1978.

A sign of his popularity was the chant containing his name; We ain't got a barrel of money, But we've got Woodward and Currie, And with Eddie Colquhoun, Promotion is soon, United.

Colquhoun won eleven international caps for Scotland between 1967 and 1973. He played in two games during a 1967 overseas tour that the Scottish Football Association decided in October 2021 to reclassify as full internationals, which increased his cap tally from nine to eleven – some match reports also credit him with a goal (against Israel) which is elsewhere assigned to Alex Ferguson.

His grandson Ben Wiles plays for Rotherham United.

Colquhoun died on 16 April 2023, at the age of 78.
