= 1969–70 Football League First Division =

1969–70 season of Football League First Division

Football League First Division
- Season: 1969–70
- Champions: Everton; 7th English title
- Relegated: Sunderland; Sheffield Wednesday
- European Cup: Everton
- European Cup Winners' Cup: Chelsea; Manchester City
- Inter-Cities Fairs Cup: Leeds United; Liverpool; Coventry City; Newcastle United; Arsenal
- Watney Cup: Derby County; Manchester United
- Matches: 462
- Goals: 1,212 (2.62 per match)
- Top goalscorer: Jeff Astle (25 goals)

Statistics of Football League First Division in the 1969–70 season.

== Overview ==
Everton won the First Division title for the seventh time in the club's history that season. They made sure of that on 1 April, with a 2–0 win over West Bromwich Albion at Goodison Park. Sheffield Wednesday went down on 22 April, after losing 2–1 at home to Manchester City whilst Sunderland had gone 7 days earlier, losing 1–0 at home to Liverpool (a win would have saved them from relegation at the expense of Crystal Palace).

== League standings ==
| Pos | Team | Pld | W | D | L | GF | GA | GAv | Pts | Qualification or relegation |
|---|---|---|---|---|---|---|---|---|---|---|
| 1 | Everton (C) | 42 | 29 | 8 | 5 | 72 | 34 | 2.118 | 66 | Qualification for the European Cup first round |
| 2 | Leeds United | 42 | 21 | 15 | 6 | 84 | 49 | 1.714 | 57 | Qualification for the Inter-Cities Fairs Cup first round |
| 3 | Chelsea | 42 | 21 | 13 | 8 | 70 | 50 | 1.400 | 55 | Qualification for the European Cup Winners' Cup first round (Note: Chelsea qualified for the European Cup Winners' Cup as the 1969-70 FA Cup winners.) |
| 4 | Derby County | 42 | 22 | 9 | 11 | 64 | 37 | 1.730 | 53 | Qualification for the Watney Cup (Note: Derby County and Manchester United qualified for the Watney Cup as the two teams with the most goals that hadn't already qualified for a European competition.) |
| 5 | Liverpool | 42 | 20 | 11 | 11 | 65 | 42 | 1.548 | 51 | Qualification for the Inter-Cities Fairs Cup first round |
| 6 | Coventry City | 42 | 19 | 11 | 12 | 58 | 48 | 1.208 | 49 | Qualification for the Inter-Cities Fairs Cup first round |
| 7 | Newcastle United | 42 | 17 | 13 | 12 | 57 | 35 | 1.629 | 47 | Qualification for the Inter-Cities Fairs Cup first round |
| 8 | Manchester United | 42 | 14 | 17 | 11 | 66 | 61 | 1.082 | 45 | Qualification for the Watney Cup |
| 9 | Stoke City | 42 | 15 | 15 | 12 | 56 | 52 | 1.077 | 45 | |
| 10 | Manchester City | 42 | 16 | 11 | 15 | 55 | 48 | 1.146 | 43 | Qualification for the European Cup Winners' Cup first round (Note: Manchester City qualified for the European Cup Winners' Cup as the 1969-70 European Cup Winners' Cup winners.) |
| 11 | Tottenham Hotspur | 42 | 17 | 9 | 16 | 54 | 55 | 0.982 | 43 | |
| 12 | Arsenal | 42 | 12 | 18 | 12 | 51 | 49 | 1.041 | 42 | Qualification for the Inter-Cities Fairs Cup first round (Note: Arsenal qualified for the Inter-Cities Fairs Cup as the 1969–70 Inter-Cities Fairs Cup winners.) |
| 13 | Wolverhampton Wanderers | 42 | 12 | 16 | 14 | 55 | 57 | 0.965 | 40 | |
| 14 | Burnley | 42 | 12 | 15 | 15 | 56 | 61 | 0.918 | 39 | |
| 15 | Nottingham Forest | 42 | 10 | 18 | 14 | 50 | 71 | 0.704 | 38 | |
| 16 | West Bromwich Albion | 42 | 14 | 9 | 19 | 58 | 66 | 0.879 | 37 | |
| 17 | West Ham United | 42 | 12 | 12 | 18 | 51 | 60 | 0.850 | 36 | |
| 18 | Ipswich Town | 42 | 10 | 11 | 21 | 40 | 63 | 0.635 | 31 | |
| 19 | Southampton | 42 | 6 | 17 | 19 | 46 | 67 | 0.687 | 29 | |
| 20 | Crystal Palace | 42 | 6 | 15 | 21 | 34 | 68 | 0.500 | 27 | |
| 21 | Sunderland (R) | 42 | 6 | 14 | 22 | 30 | 68 | 0.441 | 26 | Relegation to the Second Division |
| 22 | Sheffield Wednesday (R) | 42 | 8 | 9 | 25 | 40 | 71 | 0.563 | 25 | Relegation to the Second Division |

Source: World Football
Rules for classification: 1) Points; 2) Goal average; 3) Goals scored
(C) Champions; (R) Relegated

== Results ==
| Home \ Away | ARS | BUR | CHE | COV | CRY | DER | EVE | IPS | LEE | LIV | MCI | MUN | NEW | NOT | SHW | SOU | STK | SUN | TOT | WBA | WHU | WOL |
|---|---|---|---|---|---|---|---|---|---|---|---|---|---|---|---|---|---|---|---|---|---|---|
| Arsenal | | 3–2 | 0–3 | 0–1 | 2–0 | 4–0 | 0–1 | 0–0 | 1–1 | 2–1 | 1–1 | 2–2 | 0–0 | 2–1 | 0–0 | 2–2 | 0–0 | 3–1 | 2–3 | 1–1 | 2–1 | 2–2 |
| Burnley | 0–1 | | 3–1 | 0–0 | 4–2 | 1–1 | 1–2 | 0–1 | 1–1 | 1–5 | 1–1 | 1–1 | 0–1 | 5–0 | 4–2 | 1–1 | 1–1 | 3–0 | 0–2 | 2–1 | 3–2 | 1–3 |
| Chelsea | 3–0 | 2–0 | | 1–0 | 1–1 | 2–2 | 1–1 | 1–0 | 2–5 | 2–1 | 3–1 | 2–1 | 0–0 | 1–1 | 3–1 | 3–1 | 1–0 | 3–1 | 1–0 | 2–0 | 0–0 | 2–2 |
| Coventry City | 2–0 | 1–1 | 0–3 | | 2–2 | 1–1 | 0–1 | 3–1 | 1–2 | 2–3 | 3–0 | 1–2 | 1–0 | 3–2 | 1–1 | 4–0 | 0–3 | 1–1 | 3–2 | 3–1 | 2–2 | 1–0 |
| Crystal Palace | 1–5 | 1–2 | 1–5 | 0–3 | | 0–1 | 0–0 | 1–1 | 1–1 | 1–3 | 1–0 | 2–2 | 0–3 | 1–1 | 0–2 | 2–0 | 3–1 | 2–0 | 0–2 | 1–3 | 0–0 | 2–1 |
| Derby County | 3–2 | 0–0 | 2–2 | 1–3 | 3–1 | | 2–1 | 3–1 | 4–1 | 4–0 | 0–1 | 2–0 | 2–0 | 0–2 | 1–0 | 3–0 | 0–0 | 3–0 | 5–0 | 2–0 | 3–0 | 2–0 |
| Everton | 2–2 | 2–1 | 5–2 | 0–0 | 2–1 | 1–0 | | 3–0 | 3–2 | 0–3 | 1–0 | 3–0 | 0–0 | 1–0 | 2–1 | 4–2 | 6–2 | 3–1 | 3–2 | 2–0 | 2–0 | 1–0 |
| Ipswich Town | 2–1 | 0–1 | 1–4 | 0–1 | 2–0 | 0–1 | 0–3 | | 3–2 | 2–2 | 1–1 | 0–1 | 2–0 | 0–0 | 1–0 | 2–0 | 1–1 | 2–0 | 2–0 | 0–1 | 1–0 | 1–1 |
| Leeds United | 0–0 | 2–1 | 2–0 | 3–1 | 2–0 | 2–0 | 2–1 | 4–0 | | 1–1 | 1–3 | 2–2 | 1–1 | 6–1 | 2–0 | 1–3 | 2–1 | 2–0 | 3–1 | 5–1 | 4–1 | 3–1 |
| Liverpool | 0–1 | 3–3 | 4–1 | 2–1 | 3–0 | 0–2 | 0–2 | 2–0 | 0–0 | | 3–2 | 1–4 | 0–0 | 1–1 | 3–0 | 4–1 | 3–1 | 2–0 | 0–0 | 1–1 | 2–0 | 0–0 |
| Manchester City | 1–1 | 1–1 | 0–0 | 3–1 | 0–1 | 0–1 | 1–1 | 1–0 | 1–2 | 0–2 | | 4–0 | 2–1 | 1–1 | 4–1 | 1–0 | 0–1 | 0–1 | 1–1 | 2–1 | 1–5 | 1–0 |
| Manchester United | 2–1 | 3–3 | 0–2 | 1–1 | 1–1 | 1–0 | 0–2 | 2–1 | 2–2 | 1–0 | 1–2 | | 0–0 | 1–1 | 2–2 | 1–4 | 1–1 | 3–1 | 3–1 | 7–0 | 5–2 | 0–0 |
| Newcastle United | 3–1 | 0–1 | 0–1 | 4–0 | 0–0 | 0–1 | 1–2 | 4–0 | 2–1 | 1–0 | 1–0 | 5–1 | | 3–1 | 3–1 | 2–1 | 3–1 | 3–0 | 1–2 | 1–0 | 4–1 | 1–1 |
| Nottingham Forest | 1–1 | 1–1 | 1–1 | 1–4 | 0–0 | 1–3 | 1–1 | 1–0 | 1–4 | 1–0 | 2–2 | 1–2 | 2–2 | | 2–1 | 2–1 | 0–0 | 2–1 | 2–2 | 1–0 | 1–0 | 4–2 |
| Sheffield Wednesday | 1–1 | 2–0 | 1–3 | 0–1 | 0–0 | 1–0 | 0–1 | 2–2 | 1–2 | 1–1 | 1–2 | 1–2 | 1–0 | 2–1 | | 1–1 | 0–2 | 2–0 | 0–1 | 2–0 | 2–3 | 2–3 |
| Southampton | 0–2 | 1–1 | 2–2 | 0–0 | 1–1 | 1–1 | 2–1 | 4–2 | 1–1 | 0–1 | 0–0 | 0–3 | 1–1 | 1–2 | 4–0 | | 0–0 | 1–1 | 2–2 | 0–2 | 1–1 | 2–3 |
| Stoke City | 0–0 | 2–1 | 1–2 | 2–0 | 1–0 | 1–0 | 0–1 | 3–3 | 1–1 | 0–2 | 2–0 | 2–2 | 0–1 | 1–1 | 2–1 | 2–1 | | 4–2 | 1–1 | 3–2 | 2–1 | 1–1 |
| Sunderland | 1–1 | 0–1 | 0–0 | 0–0 | 0–0 | 1–1 | 0–0 | 2–1 | 0–0 | 0–1 | 0–4 | 1–1 | 1–1 | 2–1 | 1–2 | 2–2 | 0–3 | | 2–1 | 2–2 | 0–1 | 2–1 |
| Tottenham Hotspur | 1–0 | 4–0 | 1–1 | 1–2 | 2–0 | 2–1 | 0–1 | 3–2 | 1–1 | 0–2 | 0–3 | 2–1 | 2–1 | 4–1 | 1–0 | 0–1 | 1–0 | 0–1 | | 2–0 | 0–2 | 0–1 |
| West Bromwich Albion | 0–1 | 0–1 | 3–1 | 0–1 | 3–2 | 0–2 | 2–0 | 2–2 | 1–1 | 2–2 | 3–0 | 2–1 | 2–2 | 4–0 | 3–0 | 1–0 | 1–3 | 3–1 | 1–1 | | 3–1 | 3–3 |
| West Ham United | 1–1 | 3–1 | 2–0 | 1–2 | 2–1 | 3–0 | 0–1 | 0–0 | 2–2 | 1–0 | 0–4 | 0–0 | 1–0 | 1–1 | 3–0 | 0–0 | 3–3 | 1–1 | 0–1 | 1–3 | | 3–0 |
| Wolverhampton Wanderers | 2–0 | 1–1 | 3–0 | 0–1 | 1–1 | 1–1 | 2–3 | 2–0 | 1–2 | 0–1 | 1–3 | 0–0 | 1–1 | 3–3 | 2–2 | 2–1 | 3–1 | 1–0 | 2–2 | 1–0 | 1–0 | |

Updated to match(es) played on unknown. Source: Ian Laschke: Rothmans Book of Football League Records 1888–89 to 1978–79. Macdonald and Jane’s, London & Sydney, 1980.
Legend: Blue = home team win; Yellow = draw; Red = away team win.

== Managerial changes ==
| Team | Outgoing manager | Manner of departure | Date of vacancy | Position in table | Incoming manager | Date of appointment |
|---|---|---|---|---|---|---|
| Manchester United | (Scotland) Matt Busby | Retired | 6 June 1969 | Pre-season | (England) Wilf McGuinness | 6 June 1969 |
| Sheffield Wednesday | (Scotland) Tom McAnearney | End of caretaker spell | 1 August 1969 | Pre-season | (England) Danny Williams | 1 August 1969 |
| Burnley | (England) Harry Potts | Became general manager | 21 February 1970 | 16th | (England) Jimmy Adamson | 21 February 1970 |

== Top scorers ==
| Rank | Player | Club | Goals |
|---|---|---|---|
| 1 | (England) Jeff Astle | West Bromwich Albion | 25 |
| 2 | (England) Joe Royle | Everton | 23 |
| = | (England) Peter Osgood | Chelsea | 23 |
| 4 | (England) Pop Robson | Newcastle United | 22 |
| 5 | (Scotland) Hugh Curran | Wolverhampton Wanderers | 20 |
