= Stan Jones (English footballer) =

English footballer (born 1938)

Personal information
- Date of birth: 16 November 1938 (age 87)
- Place of birth: Highley, England
- Position: Centre half

Youth career
- Kidderminster Harriers

Senior career*
Years	Team	Apps	(Gls)
1956–1960	Walsall	30	(0)
1960–1968	West Bromwich Albion	239	(2)
1968–1973	Walsall	205	(7)
1973–?	Kidderminster Harriers		
?–1976	Hednesford Town		

Managerial career
- 1973–????: Kidderminster Harriers
- * Club domestic league appearances and goals

Stan Jones (born 16 November 1938) is an English former football defender. After starting in non-league football with Kidderminster Harriers, he played in the Football League for Walsall (two spells) and West Bromwich Albion.

Jones played youth football for Staffordshire where he was spotted by Kidderminster Harriers. After making his name at the club he was briefly associated with Wolverhampton Wanderers as an amateur before signing for Walsall in 1956. A tall, burly defender noted for his strong tackling and aerial ability, Jones attracted the attention of West Bromwich Albion and moved to the Hawthorns in May 1960 for a fee of £7,000, having been central to Walsall's Fourth Division title success in the 1959-60 season.

At Albion, Jones displaced Joe Kennedy from the number five shirt, becoming first choice at centre back for much of the 1960s. However he missed the 1966 Football League Cup Final, Albion's only trophy win during his time at the club, due to injury. The following season Jones lost his place in the Albion first team to new signing Eddie Colquhoun and in March 1968 was allowed to leave and return to Walsall.

Jones remained at Fellows Park until 1973 when he returned to Kidderminster as player-manager. He subsequently signed for Hednesford Town as a player before retiring in 1976.

Having retired from playing he remained in the game, coaching at Coleshill Town, Walsall (where he was involved in youth and reserve team matters) and Burton Albion before starting a sports equipment business in Walsall.
