= Clive Clark (footballer) =

English footballer (1940–2014)

Personal information
- Date of birth: 12 December 1940
- Place of birth: Leeds, West Riding of Yorkshire, England
- Date of death: 1 May 2014 (aged 73)
- Height: 5 ft 7 in (1.70 m)
- Position: Winger

Senior career*
Years	Team	Apps	(Gls)
1957–1958	Leeds United	0	(0)
1958–1960	Queens Park Rangers	58	(7)
1960–1969	West Bromwich Albion	301	(80)
1969–1970	Queens Park Rangers	8	(1)
1970–1973	Preston North End	72	(9)
1973–1974	Southport	8	(1)
1974	Washington Diplomats	8	(0)
Total		447	(97)
- * Club domestic league appearances and goals

Clive Clark (12 December 1940 – 1 May 2014) was an English footballer, known during his playing days by the nickname "Chippy".

== Career ==
Clark was a skilful left-winger who began his career at Leeds United as a teenager in the 1950s, but never broke into the first team at Elland Road. He joined Queens Park Rangers in September 1958, making his debut against AFC Bournemouth and went on to play 66 league games for Rangers, scoring 8 goals. A £17,000 move to West Bromwich Albion in January 1961 saw him play in the First Division for the first time. He spent nine years at the Hawthorns, forming part of an attacking force which later included Tony Brown, Jeff Astle and Bobby Hope. He scored both of West Brom's goals in their defeat at the hands of Queens Park Rangers in the 1967 Football League Cup Final and also scored in the second leg of West Brom's victory over West Ham United in the final of the same competition a year earlier. He also picked up an FA Cup winner's medal with Albion in 1968.

He returned to QPR briefly in 1969, before signing for Preston North End in 1969-70, making his debut against Bristol City on 24 January 1970. He made 83 appearances (including 2 as sub) for the Deepdale club, scoring 12 goals, and won a Third Division championship medal in 1970-71.

Clark moved to Southport in 1973, where he ended his career after just one season in the Third Division, playing eight league games and scoring once.

After retiring, he spent many years living in Filey.

== Death ==
Clark died on 1 May 2014 at the age of 73. A minute's applause was held in his memory prior to West Bromwich Albion's final game of the 2013–14 season, at home to Stoke City. The Albion players also wore black armbands for the game. The flags at Albion's home ground, the Hawthorns, flew at half-mast on the day of his funeral.

== Honours ==
West Bromwich Albion

- FA Cup: 1967–68
- Football League Cup: 1965–66; runner-up: 1966–67
