= Cockshut Hill School =

Location
- Cockshut Hill; Yardley; Birmingham, West Midlands, B26 2HX; England; 52°28′12″N 1°47′29″W

Information
- Type: Academy
- Local authority: Birmingham City Council
- Trust: Summit Learning Trust
- Department for Education URN: 142388 Tables
- Ofsted: Reports
- Principal: Jody Clarke
- Gender: Co-educational
- Age: 11 to 16
- Enrolment: 1,068
- Website: https://www.cockshuthill.org.uk/

Cockshut Hill School is a secondary school and sixth form located in the Yardley area of Birmingham, West Midlands, England.

== History ==
The school is built on the site of Cockshut Hill Council School which opened in 1937 for juniors and infants. Senior Boys and Senior Girls Departments opened in 1941 and these became separate schools in 1945. The Junior and Infants Department was divided into two departments in 1943. The Infant Department closed in 1957 and the Junior Mixed Department closed in 1958. The former Senior Boys and Senior Girls Departments later became Cockshut Hill Secondary School.

The school gained a specialism as a Technology College in the early 2000s and was renamed Cockshut Hill Technology College.

Previously a community school administered by Birmingham City Council, in October 2016 Cockshut Hill Technology College converted to academy status and was renamed Cockshut Hill School. The school is now part of the Summit Learning Trust.

GCSE results in 2019 placed Cockshut Hill School as one of the most improved schools in the West Midlands in terms of student academic progress (Progress 8).

== School profile ==
Cockshut Hill School is an eight-form entry 11-16 mixed comprehensive school situated to the southeast of Birmingham in a residential area near the border with Solihull. It serves mainly the Yardley, Sheldon and Acocks Green wards of the city. The school admits 240 pupils each year.

The buildings are situated on one site in Cockshut Hill, with on-site tennis courts and a grass games area that is used for rugby during the winter and athletics during the summer. Local off site facilities are used for a wider variety of sporting activities. The college has its own extensive playing fields in Sedgmere Road and shares the use of the local Sedgmere Club facilities.

The teaching accommodation comprises a large new-build block and facilities, alongside traditional, brick buildings. Departments are situated with their own specialist resources.

== Notable former pupils ==
- Lee Carsley (born 1974), Coventry City and Republic of Ireland midfielder
- Andy Gallinagh (born 1985), Cheltenham Town defender
- Craig Gardner (born 1986), Birmingham City central midfielder
- Mat Sadler (born 1985), Shrewsbury Town left-back and former England U-16 and U-17 captain
- Ben Turner (born 1988), Coventry City central defender
- Andy Whing (born 1984), Oxford United full back
