= Ray Potter (footballer) =

English footballer

Personal information
- Full name: Raymond John Potter
- Date of birth: 7 May 1936
- Place of birth: Beckenham, England
- Date of death: 7 August 2005 (aged 69)
- Position: Goalkeeper

Senior career*
Years	Team	Apps	(Gls)
1951–1952	Millwall	0	(0)
1952	Beckenham Town		
1953–1958	Crystal Palace	44	(0)
1958–1967	West Bromwich Albion	217	(0)
1967–1970	Portsmouth	3	(0)
- * Club domestic league appearances and goals

Raymond John Potter (7 May 1936 – 7 August 2005) was an English footballer who played for Crystal Palace, Portsmouth and West Bromwich Albion.

== Honours ==
West Bromwich Albion

- Football League Cup: 1965–66
