= John Osborne (footballer) =

English footballer

Personal information
- Date of birth: 1 December 1940
- Place of birth: Barlborough, Derbyshire, England
- Date of death: 7 November 1998 (aged 57)
- Place of death: Worcester, Worcestershire, England
- Position: Goalkeeper

Youth career
- Bolton Wanderers

Senior career*
Years	Team	Apps	(Gls)
1960–1966	Chesterfield	110	(0)
1966–1977	West Bromwich Albion	250	(0)
1972	→ Walsall (loan)	3	(0)
1978	Shamrock Rovers	1	(0)
Total		367	(0)
- * Club domestic league appearances and goals

John Osborne (1 December 1940 – 7 November 1998) was an English football goalkeeper. He played for Chesterfield, West Bromwich Albion and Shamrock Rovers. Osborne was a member of Albion's great cup side of the late 1960s which played in 5 cup finals from 1966 to 1970, including the 1968 FA Cup final. His nickname was Bionic due to the plastic joint inserted in his finger.

He made his Rovers debut at Milltown under his old teammate Johnny Giles on 10 September 1978. He played 3 games in the 1978–79 European Cup Winners' Cup keeping 2 clean sheets giving him a total of 4 appearances for the Hoops.

In 2004, he was named as one of West Bromwich Albion's 16 greatest players, in a poll organised as part of the club's 125th anniversary celebrations.

Osborne was the commercial manager of Worcestershire County Cricket Club from 1986 to 1995, and played a significant part in the county's signing of long-time major sponsor MEB.

He died in Evesham Hospital, Worcestershire on 7 November 1998 from lung cancer.

== Honours ==
West Bromwich Albion

- FA Cup: 1967–68
- Football League Cup runner-up: 1969–70
