= Eddie Readfern =

English footballer

Personal information
- Full name: Thomas Edward Readfern
- Date of birth: 9 July 1944 (age 82)
- Place of birth: Crook, County Durham, England
- Position: Centre-forward

Youth career
- Liverpool (amateur)
- Langley Park Juniors
- 1960–1961: West Bromwich Albion (amateur)

Senior career*
Years	Team	Apps	(Gls)
1961–1964	West Bromwich Albion	4	(0)
1964–1965	Kidderminster Harriers	5	(1)
1965–1966	Hednesford Town		
1966–1968	Stourbridge		
- * Club domestic league appearances and goals

Thomas Edward Readfern (born 9 July 1944), better known as Eddie Readfern, is an English former footballer who played as a centre-forward.

== Career ==
Readfern was born in Crook, County Durham. He joined West Bromwich Albion as an amateur in May 1960 and turned professional in July 1961, making his debut in September 1963 against Birmingham City. In July 1964 he joined Kidderminster Harriers, before moving to Hednesford Town in December 1965, where he remained for a year. Between December 1966 and May 1968 he played for Stourbridge and after retiring from football worked for British Telecom.
