= John Kaye (footballer) =

English footballer and manager

Personal information
- Date of birth: 3 March 1940 (age 86)
- Place of birth: Goole, West Riding of Yorkshire, England
- Positions: Striker; centre back

Senior career*
Years	Team	Apps	(Gls)
1957–1960	Goole Town		
1960–1963	Scunthorpe United	77	(25)
1963–1971	West Bromwich Albion	284	(45)
1971–1975	Hull City	72	(9)
Total		433	(79)
- * Club domestic league appearances and goals

John Kaye (born 3 March 1940) is an English former footballer and manager.

== Career ==
Kaye joined West Bromwich Albion from Scunthorpe United in May 1963 for £44,750, a club record for Albion at the time. He made his debut for the Baggies against Leicester City in August 1963. Kaye played for Albion between 1963 until 1971 during which time he won the FA Cup and the Football League Cup (also finishing runner-up in this competition twice) He scored for Albion in the second leg of their 1966 League Cup Final triumph over West Ham. Kaye left Albion in 1971 when he was sold to Hull City.

Kaye managed Hull City for a time period of September 1974 – October 1977. He had an overall win percentage of 31.2%.

== Management statistics ==
Managerial record by team and tenure
Team	From	To	Record					Ref
Team	From	To	P	W	D	L	Win %	Ref
Hull City	25 September 1974	1 October 1977	138	43	42	53	31.2	

== Honours ==
West Bromwich Albion

- FA Cup: 1967–68
- Football League Cup: 1965–66; runner-up: 1966–67, 1969–70

Hull City

- Watney Cup runner-up: 1973
