= Leo Callaghan =

Welsh football referee (1924–1987)

- Born: 5 February 1924; Merthyr Tydfil, Wales
- Died: 8 January 1987 (aged 62); Wales

Domestic
Years	League	Role
1954–1971	Football League	Referee

International
Years	League	Role
1954–1971	FIFA listed	Referee

Leo Callaghan (5 February 1924 – 8 January 1987) was a Welsh association football referee in the English Football League. He was also a Welsh FIFA referee.

== Career ==
Callaghan was born in Merthyr Tydfil, Wales. He made the Football League referees list in 1954 at the age of thirty, and went on to have a seventeen-year career at this level. His greatest domestic honour came when he took charge of the 1968 FA Cup Final between West Bromwich Albion and Everton at Wembley. He is one of only three Welshmen to referee the Final (the others being Mervyn Griffiths and Clive Thomas).

He was also an international referee. This included two Group matches as linesman and one Group C match as referee (between Portugal and Hungary) at the 1966 World Cup Finals in England, as well as six matches in eleven years involving England in the British Home Championship, and in European competitions, such as the 1968 UEFA European Football Championship qualifying rounds. On 11 June 1967 he took charge of Sweden versus Bulgaria in the Råsunda Stadium, Solna, in that competition. As regards club competitions, Callaghan was in charge of, for example, Atlético Madrid against FK Vojvodina in their second round second leg tie in the European Cup on 14 December 1966 at the Estadio del Manzanares, when the two-leg scores tied at 3–3, and the result had to be decided by a tie-break match a week later.

An extraordinary event occurred on 14 September 1970. Whilst refereeing a Football League Second Division match between Millwall and Sheffield United, the city of London was engulfed by "[t]orrential rain", causing the "abandonment of [the] game after 25 minutes by ... Callaghan ...".

He retired from the League list in 1971. He later became a Football League assessor.

Preceded by Ken Dagnall	FA Cup Final Referee; 1968	Succeeded by George McCabe
