= 1969–70 Football League Cup =

Tournament details
- Country: England; Wales
- Teams: 92

Final positions
- Champions: Manchester City (1st title)
- Runners-up: West Bromwich Albion

Tournament statistics
- Top goal scorer: Colin Bell (4 goals)

The 1969–70 Football League Cup was the tenth season of the Football League Cup, a knockout competition for England's top 92 football clubs. The competition started on 12 August 1969 and ended with the final on 7 March 1970.

The final was contested by First Division team Manchester City and First Division side West Bromwich Albion at Wembley Stadium in London. Jeff Astle opened the scoring for Albion after five minutes, becoming the first player to score in the final of both the League Cup and FA Cup at Wembley. He had already scored in the first leg of the 1966 League Cup Final four years previously at West Ham United's Boleyn Ground. City equalised through Mike Doyle to send the game into extra-time, and eventually won 2–1, with Glyn Pardoe scoring the winner.

This was the first season in which all ninety-two football league clubs competed in the tournament.

== Calendar ==
Of the 92 teams, 36 received a bye to the second round (teams ranked 1st–35th in the 1968–69 Football League, plus 1969 League Cup winners Swindon Town) and the other 56 played in the first round. Semi-finals were two-legged.

Round	Main date	Fixtures		Clubs	New entries this round
Round	Main date	Original	Replays	Clubs	New entries this round
First Round	13 August 1969	28	10	92 → 64	56 (teams ranked 14th–22nd in Second Division; all Third and Fourth Division except Swindon Town)
Second Round	3 September 1969	32	9	64 → 32	36 (teams ranked 1st–13th in Second Division; all First Division; Swindon Town as holders)
Third Round	24 September 1969	16	5	32 → 16	none
Fourth Round	14 October 1969	8	2	16 → 8	none
Fifth Round	29 October 1969	4	3	8 → 4	none
Semi-finals	November & December, 1969	4	0	4 → 2	none
Final	7 March 1970	1	0	2 → 1	none

== First round ==
=== Ties ===
Date	Home team	Score (half-time)	Away team	Home Scorers	Away Scorers	Attendance
12 August 1969	Bradford Park Avenue	0–2 (0-1)	Rotherham United		Brown (og), Mullen	3,980
12 August 1969	Newport County	2–3 (0-1)	Swansea City	Hill, Cooper	Thomas (p), Nurse, Gwyther	3,824
12 August 1969	Scunthorpe United	0-2 (0-2)	Hartlepool		Ron Young (2)	2,800
12 August 1969	Southend United	2–2 (0-2)	Brentford	Chisnall, Gelson (og),	Mansley (2)	9,356
13 August 1969	Aldershot	0–1 (0-0)	Gillingham		Folds	5,179
13 August 1969	Barnsley	0–1 (0-0)	Halifax Town		Flowers	9,546
13 August 1969	Bolton Wanderers	6–3 (1-3)	Rochdale	Byron (3), Wharton (p), Greaves (2)	Butler (2), Jenkins	10,057
13 August 1969	Bournemouth & Boscombe Athletic	3–0 (2-0)	Bristol Rovers	Hold, McDougall (2)		7,478
13 August 1969	Bradford City	1–1 (1-1)	Chesterfield	Ham	Archer	6,449
13 August 1969	Brighton & Hove Albion	1–0 (0-0)	Portsmouth	Dawson		19,787
13 August 1969	Chester	1–2 (0-1)	Aston Villa	Dearden	McMahon, Hamilton	10,510
13 August 1969	Colchester United	1–1 (1-1)	Reading	Massay	Harris (p)	5,165
13 August 1969	Crewe Alexandra	0–0	Wrexham			4,948
13 August 1969	Darlington	3–0 (2-0)	York City	O'Neill (2), Gauden		3,953
13 August 1969	Exeter City	1–1 (1-0)	Bristol City	Banks	Kellard	8,003
13 August 1969	Grimsby Town	0–2 (0-1)	Doncaster Rovers		Robertson, Mobley (og)	6,243
13 August 1969	Mansfield Town	3–1 (2-0)	Notts County	Bates, Jones (og), Walters	Barker	6,727
13 August 1969	Orient	0–0	Fulham			8,676
13 August 1969	Oxford United	2–0 (0-0)	Northampton Town	G. Atkinson, Jones		7,158
13 August 1969	Peterborough United	1–1 (1-1)	Luton Town	Price	Sheffield	10,249
13 August 1969	Plymouth Argyle	2–2 (1-2)	Torquay United	Kitchener (og), Burnside	E Walsh, Binney	15,199
13 August 1969	Port Vale	0–1 (0-1)	Tranmere Rovers		Beamish	4,955
13 August 1969	Preston North End	0–1 (0-0)	Bury		Arrowsmith	9,021
13 August 1969	Shrewsbury Town	1–0 (0-0)	Walsall	McLaughlin		6,971
13 August 1969	Southport	5–1 (0-0)	Oldham Athletic	Colquhoun (og), A Russell, Andrew (2), Redrobe	Beardall	2,873
13 August 1969	Stockport County	0–2 (0-1)	Blackburn Rovers		Knighton, Connelly	5,925
13 August 1969	Watford	2–1 (2-1)	Lincoln City	Endean, Scullion	Hubbard	10,086
13 August 1969	Workington	0–0	Barrow			3,969

=== Replays ===
Home team	Score	Away team	Date
Barrow	3–1	Workington	18 August 1969
Brentford	0–0	Southend United	18 August 1969
Bristol City	3–2	Exeter City	19 August 1969
Chesterfield	0–1	Bradford City	20 August 1969
Fulham	3–1	Leyton Orient	18 August 1969
Luton Town	5–2	Peterborough United	19 August 1969
Reading	0–3	Colchester United	20 August 1969
Torquay United	1–0	Plymouth Argyle	20 August 1969
Wrexham	1–0	Crewe Alexandra	18 August 1969

=== Second Replay ===
Home team	Score	Away team	Date
Brentford	2–3	Southend United	21 August 1969

== Second round ==
=== Ties ===
Home team	Score	Away team	Date
Aston Villa	1–2	West Bromwich Albion	3 September 1969
Barrow	1–2	Nottingham Forest	3 September 1969
Blackburn Rovers	4–2	Doncaster Rovers	3 September 1969
Blackpool	3–1	Gillingham	3 September 1969
Bolton Wanderers	0–0	Rotherham United	3 September 1969
Brighton & Hove Albion	2–0	Birmingham City	3 September 1969
Bristol City	0–0	Leicester City	2 September 1969
Carlisle United	2–0	Huddersfield Town	2 September 1969
Charlton Athletic	0–2	Wrexham	2 September 1969
Coventry City	0–1	Chelsea	2 September 1969
Crystal Palace	3–1	Cardiff City	3 September 1969
Darlington	0–1	Everton	3 September 1969
Fulham	0–1	Leeds United	3 September 1969
Hartlepool	1–3	Derby County	3 September 1969
Hull City	1–0	Norwich City	3 September 1969
Ipswich Town	4–0	Colchester United	3 September 1969
Luton Town	2–2	Millwall	2 September 1969
Manchester United	1–0	Middlesbrough	3 September 1969
Mansfield Town	2–2	Queens Park Rangers	3 September 1969
Oxford United	4–1	Bury	3 September 1969
Sheffield United	2–0	Newcastle United	2 September 1969
Sheffield Wednesday	1–1	Bournemouth & Boscombe Athletic	3 September 1969
Shrewsbury Town	2–2	Southend United	2 September 1969
Southampton	1–1	Arsenal	2 September 1969
Southport	0–3	Manchester City	3 September 1969
Stoke City	0–2	Burnley	3 September 1969
Sunderland	1–2	Bradford City	3 September 1969
Swansea City	1–3	Swindon Town	2 September 1969
Tranmere Rovers	2–1	Torquay United	3 September 1969
Watford	1–2	Liverpool	3 September 1969
West Ham United	4–2	Halifax Town	3 September 1969
Wolverhampton Wanderers	1–0	Tottenham Hotspur	3 September 1969

=== Replays ===
Home team	Score	Away team	Date
Arsenal	2–0	Southampton	4 September 1969
Bournemouth & Boscombe Athletic	1–0	Sheffield Wednesday	9 September 1969
Leicester City	0–0	Bristol City	10 September 1969
Millwall	0–1	Luton Town	8 September 1969
Queens Park Rangers	4–0	Mansfield Town	9 September 1969
Rotherham United	3–3	Bolton Wanderers	9 September 1969
Southend United	2–0	Shrewsbury Town	8 September 1969

=== Second Replays ===
Home team	Score	Away team	Date
Leicester City	3–1	Bristol City	15 September 1969
Rotherham United	1–0	Bolton Wanderers	11 September 1969

== Third round ==
=== Ties ===
Home team	Score	Away team	Date
Arsenal	0–0	Everton	24 September 1969
Bournemouth & Boscombe Athletic	0–2	Leicester City	24 September 1969
Bradford City	2–1	Southend United	24 September 1969
Brighton & Hove Albion	2–3	Wolverhampton Wanderers	24 September 1969
Crystal Palace	2–2	Blackpool	24 September 1969
Carlisle United	2–1	Blackburn Rovers	24 September 1969
Derby County	3–1	Hull City	24 September 1969
Ipswich Town	1–1	West Bromwich Albion	24 September 1969
Leeds United	1–1	Chelsea	24 September 1969
Manchester City	3–2	Liverpool	24 September 1969
Manchester United	2–0	Wrexham	23 September 1969
Nottingham Forest	1–0	West Ham United	23 September 1969
Oxford United	1–0	Swindon Town	24 September 1969
Queens Park Rangers	6–0	Tranmere Rovers	23 September 1969
Rotherham United	1–1	Burnley	24 September 1969
Sheffield United	3–0	Luton Town	23 September 1969

=== Replays ===
Home team	Score	Away team	Date
Everton	1–0	Arsenal	30 September 1969
Blackpool	0–1	Crystal Palace	30 September 1969
Burnley	2–0	Rotherham United	30 September 1969
Chelsea	2–0	Leeds United	6 October 1969
West Bromwich Albion	2–0	Ipswich Town	30 September 1969

== Fourth round ==
=== Ties ===
Home team	Score	Away team	Date
Burnley	0–0	Manchester United	14 October 1969
Crystal Palace	1–1	Derby County	14 October 1969
Carlisle United	1–0	Chelsea	14 October 1969
Leicester City	2–0	Sheffield United	14 October 1969
Manchester City	2–1	Everton	14 October 1969
Nottingham Forest	0–1	Oxford United	14 October 1969
Queens Park Rangers	3–1	Wolverhampton Wanderers	14 October 1969
West Bromwich Albion	4–0	Bradford City	14 October 1969

=== Replays ===
Home team	Score	Away team	Date
Derby County	3–0	Crystal Palace	29 October 1969
Manchester United	1–0	Burnley	20 October 1969

== Fifth Round ==
=== Ties ===
Home team	Score	Away team	Date
Derby County	0–0	Manchester United	12 November 1969
Leicester City	0–0	West Bromwich Albion	29 October 1969
Manchester City	3–0	Queens Park Rangers	29 October 1969
Oxford United	0–0	Carlisle United	29 October 1969

=== Replays ===
Home team	Score	Away team	Date
Manchester United	1–0	Derby County	19 November 1969
Carlisle United	1–0	Oxford United	4 November 1969
West Bromwich Albion	2–1	Leicester City	5 November 1969

== Semi-finals ==
=== First leg ===
Home team	Score	Away team	Date
Carlisle United	1–0	West Bromwich Albion	19 November 1969
Manchester City	2–1	Manchester United	3 December 1969

=== Second leg ===
Home team	Score	Away team	Date	Agg
Manchester United	2–2	Manchester City	17 December 1969	3–4
West Bromwich Albion	4–1	Carlisle United	3 December 1969	4–2

== Final ==
The final was held at Wembley Stadium, London on 7 March 1970.

7 March 1970
15:00 BST

Manchester City	2–1 (a.e.t.)	West Bromwich Albion
Doyle 60'; Pardoe 102'		Astle 5'

Wembley Stadium, London
Attendance: 97,963
Referee: V. James
