= 1967–68 FA Cup =

Tournament details
- Country: England

Final positions
- Champions: West Bromwich Albion
- Runners-up: Everton

Tournament statistics
- Top goal scorer: Tony Hateley (8)

The 1967–68 FA Cup was the 87th season of the world's oldest football cup competition, the Football Association Challenge Cup, commonly known as the FA Cup. West Bromwich Albion won the competition, defeating Everton 1–0 after extra time in the final at Wembley, London.

Matches were played at the stadium of the team named first on the date specified for each round, which was always a Saturday. If the weather was inclement, a match may have been played at a different date to that originally planned. If scores were level after 90 minutes had been played, a replay would take place at the stadium of the second-named team later the same week. If the replayed match was drawn further replays would be held at neutral venues until a winner was determined. If scores were level after 90 minutes had been played in a replay, a 30-minute period of extra time would be played.

== Calendar ==
Round	Date
Preliminary Round	Saturday 2 September 1967
First Round Qualifying	Saturday 16 September 1967
Second Round Qualifying	Saturday 30 September 1967
Third Round Qualifying	Saturday 14 October 1967
Fourth Round Qualifying	Saturday 28 October 1967
First Round Proper	Saturday 9 December 1967
Second Round Proper	Saturday 6 January 1968
Third Round Proper	Saturday 27 January 1968
Fourth Round Proper	Saturday 17 February 1968
Fifth Round Proper	Saturday 9 March 1968
Sixth Round Proper	Saturday 30 March 1968
Semi-Finals	Saturday 27 April 1968
Final	Saturday 18 May 1968

== Results ==
=== First Round Proper ===
At this stage clubs from the Football League Third and Fourth Divisions joined those non-league clubs having come through the qualifying rounds. Matches were due to be played on Saturday, 9 December 1967, but snow and ice forced the postponement of 12 ties and the abandonment of two more, at Tow Law and Brentford.

Tie no	Home team	Score	Away team	Date	Attendance	Notes
1	Chesterfield	2–0	Barnsley	9 December 1967		
2	Bournemouth & Boscombe Athletic	2–0	Northampton Town	9 December 1967		
3	Barrow	2–0	Oldham Athletic	9 December 1967		
4	Grantham	1–3	Altrincham	9 December 1967		
5	Weymouth	0–2	Orient	9 December 1967		
6	Yeovil Town	1–3	Margate	13 December 1967	6,612	
7	Reading	6–2	Aldershot	13 December 1967	14,750	
8	Grimsby Town	1–1	Bradford Park Avenue	9 December 1967		
Replay	Bradford Park Avenue	4–1	Grimsby Town	11 December 1967	5,243	
9	Luton Town	2–1	Oxford City	14 December 1967	13,394	
10	Swindon Town	4–0	Salisbury	12 December 1967	12,193	
11	Shrewsbury Town	3–0	Darlington	13 December 1967	7,294	
12	Tranmere Rovers	5–1	Rochdale	9 December 1967		
13	Stockport County	1–1	Macclesfield Town	9 December 1967		
Replay	Macclesfield Town	4–1	Stockport County	13 December 1967	8,944	
14	Leytonstone	0–1	Walsall	9 December 1967		
15	Brentford	2–2	Guildford City	14 December 1967	10,150	
Replay	Guildford City	2–1	Brentford	18 December 1967	7,289	
16	Lowestoft Town	0–1	Watford	9 December 1967		
17	Brighton & Hove Albion	1–0	Southend United	13 December 1967	12,296	
18	Bradford City	7–1	Wrexham	9 December 1967		
19	Wimbledon	3–0	Romford	9 December 1967		
20	Goole Town	0–0	Spennymoor United	9 December 1967		
Replay	Spennymoor United	3–1	Goole Town	13 December 1967	3,900	
21	Hartlepools United	2–3	Bury	9 December 1967	4,830	
22	Scunthorpe United	2–0	Skelmersdale United	9 December 1967		
23	Tow Law Town	5–1	Mansfield Town	13 December 1967	2,500	
24	Port Vale	1–2	Chester	9 December 1967		
25	Halifax Town	3–2	Crewe Alexandra	13 December 1967	6,816	
26	Newport County	3–0	Gillingham	18 December 1967	2,452	
27	Swansea Town	2–0	Enfield	18 December 1967	6,161	
28	Southport	3–1	Lincoln City	9 December 1967		
29	Runcorn	1–0	Notts County	9 December 1967		
30	Torquay United	1–1	Colchester United	12 December 1967	6,655	
Replay	Colchester United	2–1	Torquay United	18 December 1967	7,079	
31	Walthamstow Avenue	2–1	Kidderminster Harriers	9 December 1967		
32	York City	0–1	Doncaster Rovers	9 December 1967		
33	Hereford United	3–2	Barnet	13 December 1967	6,392	
34	Peterborough United	5–2	Falmouth Town	11 December 1967	6,484	
35	Chelmsford City	3–3	Oxford United	9 December 1967		
Replay	Oxford United	3–3	Chelmsford City	13 December 1967	8,902	
2nd replay	Chelmsford City	1–0	Oxford United	18 December 1967	4,350	^{[A]}
36	Nuneaton Borough	0–0	Exeter City	9 December 1967		
Replay	Exeter City	0–0	Nuneaton Borough	13 December 1967	6,909	
2nd replay	Nuneaton Borough	0–1	Exeter City	18 December 1967	5,070	^{[B]}
37	Corby Town	0–4	Boston United	9 December 1967		
38	Dagenham	1–0	Tonbridge	9 December 1967		
39	Ryhope Colliery Welfare	0–1	Workington	9 December 1967		
40	Arnold	0–3	Bristol Rovers	9 December 1967		

=== Second Round Proper ===
The matches were scheduled for Saturday, 6 January 1968, though the match at Tow Law was postponed due to bad weather. Four matches were drawn, with replays taking place as soon as conditions permitted.

Tie no	Home team	Score	Away team	Date	Attendance	Notes
1	Chester	0–1	Chesterfield	6 January 1968		
2	Watford	3–0	Hereford United	6 January 1968		
3	Reading	1–1	Dagenham	6 January 1968		
Replay	Dagenham	0–1	Reading	15 January 1968	8,000	
4	Macclesfield Town	2–0	Spennymoor United	6 January 1968		
5	Swindon Town	3–2	Luton Town	6 January 1968	18,203	
6	Doncaster Rovers	1–1	Workington	6 January 1968		
Replay	Workington	1–2	Doncaster Rovers	10 January 1968	4,740	
7	Bradford City	2–3	Bury	6 January 1968		
8	Wimbledon	0–4	Bristol Rovers	6 January 1968		
9	Altrincham	1–2	Barrow	6 January 1968		
10	Bradford Park Avenue	2–3	Tranmere Rovers	6 January 1968		
11	Exeter City	1–3	Walsall	6 January 1968		
12	Tow Law Town	1–1	Shrewsbury Town	15 January 1968	3,000	
Replay	Shrewsbury Town	6–2	Tow Law Town	18 January 1968	12,000	
13	Halifax Town	1–0	Scunthorpe United	6 January 1968		
14	Margate	0–4	Peterborough United	6 January 1968	7,366	
15	Swansea Town	2–1	Brighton & Hove Albion	6 January 1968		
16	Southport	4–2	Runcorn	6 January 1968		
17	Walthamstow Avenue	1–3	Bournemouth & Boscombe Athletic	6 January 1968		
18	Guildford City	0–1	Newport County	6 January 1968	8,774	
19	Boston United	1–1	Orient	6 January 1968		
Replay	Orient	2–1	Boston United	15 January 1968	11,495	
20	Chelmsford City	0–2	Colchester United	6 January 1968		

=== Third Round Proper ===
The 44 First and Second Division clubs entered the competition at this stage. The matches were played on Saturday, 27 January 1968. Ten matches were drawn, with replays taking place later the same week, and one tie required a second replay.

Tie no	Home team	Score	Away team	Date	Attendance	Notes
1	Blackpool	2–1	Chesterfield	27 January 1968		
2	Bournemouth & Boscombe Athletic	0–0	Liverpool	27 January 1968	24,388	
Replay	Liverpool	4–1	Bournemouth & Boscombe Athletic	30 January 1968	54,075	
3	Barrow	1–2	Leicester City	27 January 1968		
4	Bristol City	0–0	Bristol Rovers	27 January 1968		
Replay	Bristol Rovers	1–2	Bristol City	30 January 1968	30,157	
5	Burnley	1–3	West Ham United	27 January 1968	23,452	
6	Southampton	1–1	Newport County	27 January 1968	23,789	
Replay	Newport County	2–3	Southampton	30 January 1968	20,000	
7	Watford	0–1	Sheffield United	27 January 1968		
8	Walsall	1–1	Crystal Palace	27 January 1968		
Replay	Crystal Palace	1–2	Walsall	31 January 1968	27,414	
9	Nottingham Forest	4–2	Bolton Wanderers	27 January 1968		
10	Aston Villa	3–0	Millwall	27 January 1968		
11	Sheffield Wednesday	3–0	Plymouth Argyle	27 January 1968	29,283	
12	Middlesbrough	1–1	Hull City	27 January 1968		
Replay	Hull City	2–2	Middlesbrough	31 January 1968	33,196	
2nd replay	Middlesbrough	1–0	Hull City	7 February 1968	20,000	^{[C]}
13	Swindon Town	1–0	Blackburn Rovers	27 January 1968	20,830	
14	Shrewsbury Town	1–1	Arsenal	27 January 1968		
Replay	Arsenal	2–0	Shrewsbury Town	30 January 1968	41,963	
15	Doncaster Rovers	0–2	Swansea Town	27 January 1968		
16	Tranmere Rovers	2–1	Huddersfield Town	27 January 1968	20,038	
17	Newcastle United	0–1	Carlisle United	27 January 1968	56,569	
18	Manchester City	0–0	Reading	27 January 1968	40,343	
Replay	Reading	0–7	Manchester City	31 January 1968	25,659	
19	Queens Park Rangers	1–3	Preston North End	27 January 1968		
20	Fulham	4–2	Macclesfield Town	27 January 1968		
21	Coventry City	3–0	Charlton Athletic	27 January 1968		
22	Manchester United	2–2	Tottenham Hotspur	27 January 1968	63,500	
Replay	Tottenham Hotspur	1–0	Manchester United	31 January 1968	57,200	
23	Norwich City	1–1	Sunderland	27 January 1968	26,389	
Replay	Sunderland	0–1	Norwich City	31 January 1968	32,923	
24	Chelsea	3–0	Ipswich Town	27 January 1968	42,986	
25	Halifax Town	2–4	Birmingham City	27 January 1968	18,119	
26	Southport	0–1	Everton	27 January 1968	18,795	
27	Leeds United	2–0	Derby County	27 January 1968	37,768	
28	Stoke City	4–1	Cardiff City	27 January 1968		
29	Rotherham United	1–0	Wolverhampton Wanderers	27 January 1968		
30	Peterborough United	0–1	Portsmouth	27 January 1968	16,907	
31	Colchester United	1–1	West Bromwich Albion	27 January 1968	16,981	
Replay	West Bromwich Albion	4–0	Colchester United	31 January 1968	40,448	
32	Orient	1–0	Bury	27 January 1968		

=== Fourth Round Proper ===
The matches were played on Saturday, 17 February 1968. Six matches were drawn and replayed later the same week.

Tie no	Home team	Score	Away team	Date	Attendance	Notes
1	Walsall	0–0	Liverpool	17 February 1968	21,066	
Replay	Liverpool	5–2	Walsall	19 February 1968	39,113	
2	Aston Villa	0–1	Rotherham United	17 February 1968		
3	Sheffield Wednesday	2–1	Swindon Town	17 February 1968	37,457	
4	Middlesbrough	1–1	Bristol City	17 February 1968		
Replay	Bristol City	2–1	Middlesbrough	20 February 1968	21,771	
5	West Bromwich Albion	1–1	Southampton	17 February 1968	32,987	
Replay	Southampton	2–3	West Bromwich Albion	21 February 1968	26,036	
6	Sheffield United	2–1	Blackpool	17 February 1968		
7	Tottenham Hotspur	3–1	Preston North End	17 February 1968	47,088	
8	Manchester City	0–0	Leicester City	17 February 1968	51,009	
Replay	Leicester City	4–3	Manchester City	19 February 1968	39,112	
9	Fulham	0–0	Portsmouth	17 February 1968		
Replay	Portsmouth	1–0	Fulham	21 February 1968	43,967	
10	Coventry City	1–1	Tranmere Rovers	17 February 1968		
Replay	Tranmere Rovers	2–0	Coventry City	21 February 1968	24,000	
11	Carlisle United	0–2	Everton	17 February 1968	25,000	
12	Chelsea	1–0	Norwich City	17 February 1968		
13	Swansea Town	0–1	Arsenal	17 February 1968		
14	Leeds United	2–1	Nottingham Forest	17 February 1968	51,739	
15	Stoke City	0–3	West Ham United	17 February 1968	36,704	
16	Birmingham City	3–0	Orient	17 February 1968	29,320	

=== Fifth Round Proper ===
The matches were played on Saturday, 9 March 1968. Four matches were drawn and replayed later the same week.

Tie no	Home team	Score	Away team	Date	Attendance	Notes
1	Sheffield Wednesday	2–2	Chelsea	9 March 1968	49,186	
Replay	Chelsea	2–0	Sheffield Wednesday	12 March 1968	55,013	
2	Everton	2–0	Tranmere Rovers	9 March 1968	61,982	
3	Tottenham Hotspur	1–1	Liverpool	9 March 1968	54,005	
Replay	Liverpool	2–1	Tottenham Hotspur	12 March 1968	53,658	
4	Portsmouth	1–2	West Bromwich Albion	9 March 1968	45,642	
5	West Ham United	1–2	Sheffield United	9 March 1968	38,440	
6	Arsenal	1–1	Birmingham City	9 March 1968	45,526	
Replay	Birmingham City	2–1	Arsenal	12 March 1968	51,586	
7	Leeds United	2–0	Bristol City	9 March 1968	45,227	
8	Rotherham United	1–1	Leicester City	9 March 1968		
Replay	Leicester City	2–0	Rotherham United	13 March 1968	41,856	

=== Sixth Round Proper ===
30 March 1968

Leicester City	1–3	Everton
Nish		Husband; Kendall

Filbert Street, Leicester
Attendance: 43,519
30 March 1968

West Bromwich Albion	0–0	Liverpool

The Hawthorns, West Bromwich
Attendance: 53,062
30 March 1968

Leeds United	1–0	Sheffield United
Madeley

Elland Road, Leeds
Attendance: 48,322
30 March 1968

Birmingham City	1–0	Chelsea
Pickering

St Andrew's, Birmingham
Attendance: 51,576

Replay

8 April 1968

Liverpool	1–1	West Bromwich Albion
Hateley 24'		Astle 70'

Anfield, Liverpool
Attendance: 54,273

Second replay

18 April 1968

West Bromwich Albion	2–1	Liverpool
Astle; Clark		Hateley 59'

Maine Road, Manchester
Attendance: 56,000

=== Semi-Finals ===
27 April 1968

West Bromwich Albion	2–0	Birmingham City
Astle; Brown

Villa Park, Birmingham
Attendance: 60,831
27 April 1968

Everton	1–0	Leeds United
Morrissey (pen.)

Old Trafford, Manchester
Attendance: 63,000

=== Final ===
The final took place on Saturday, 18 May 1968 at Wembley and ended in a victory for West Bromwich Albion over Everton by 1–0 after extra time. The goal was scored by Jeff Astle, who scored in every round in which his team had played. The attendance was 100,000.

18 May 1968
15:00 BST

West Bromwich Albion	1–0	Everton
Astle 93'

Wembley, London
Attendance: 100,000
Referee: Leo Callaghan

West Bromwich Albion	Everton

== Notes ==
A.: Match played at Griffin Park, London.
B.: Match played at Ashton Gate, Bristol.
C.: Match played at Bootham Crescent, York.
