= 1965–66 Football League Cup =

Tournament details
- Country: England; Wales
- Teams: 83

Final positions
- Champions: West Bromwich Albion
- Runners-up: West Ham United

Tournament statistics
- Goals scored: Geoff Hurst (11 goals)

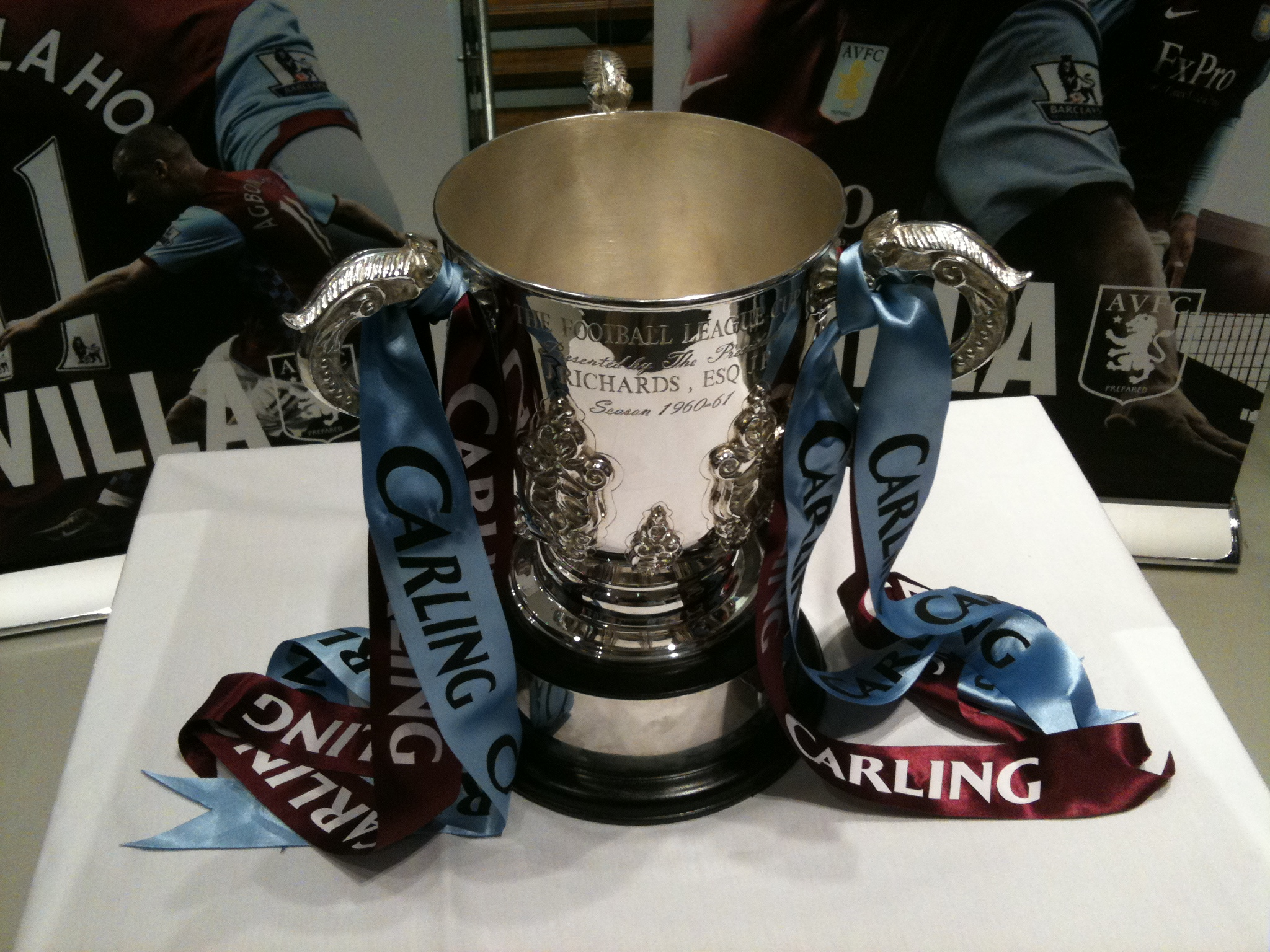
A replica of the English League Cup trophy on display in the store of Aston Villa Football Club in Birmingham.

The 1965–66 Football League Cup was the sixth season of the Football League Cup, a knockout competition for England's top 92 football clubs; only 83 of them competed. (Note: Arsenal, Chelsea, Everton, Liverpool, Manchester United, Nottingham Forest, Sheffield Wednesday, Tottenham Hotspur and Wolverhampton Wanderers were the 9 League clubs that did not compete.) The competition ended with the two-legged final on 9 and 23 March 1966.

Match dates and results were initially drawn from Soccerbase, and they were later checked against Rothmans Football Yearbook 1970–71.

== Calendar ==
Of the 83 teams, 45 received a bye to the second round and the other 38 played in the first round; these were the teams ranked 55th–92nd in the 1964–65 Football League. Semi-finals and final were two-legged.

| Round | Main date | Fixtures | | Clubs | New entries this round |
| Round | Main date | Original | Replays | Clubs | New entries this round |
|---|---|---|---|---|---|
| First Round | 1 September 1965 | 19 | 9 | 83 → 64 | 38 (teams ranked 11th–24th in Third Division; all Fourth Division) |
| Second Round | 22 September 1965 | 32 | 4 | 64 → 32 | 45 (all First and Second Division, except those teams that did not enter; teams ranked 1st–10th in Third Division) |
| Third Round | 13 October 1965 | 16 | 4 | 32 → 16 | none |
| Fourth Round | 3 November 1965 | 8 | 3 | 16 → 8 | none |
| Fifth Round | 17 November 1965 | 4 | 1 | 8 → 4 | none |
| Semi-finals | December 1965 – February 1966 | 4 | 0 | 4 → 2 | none |
| Final | 9 & 23 March 1966 | 2 | 0 | 2 → 1 | none |

== First round ==
=== Ties ===
| Home team | Score | Away team | Date |
|---|---|---|---|
| Barrow | 1–1 | Rochdale | 1 September 1965 |
| Bournemouth & Boscombe Athletic | 0–0 | Aldershot | 1 September 1965 |
| Bradford Park Avenue | 1–0 | Halifax Town | 1 September 1965 |
| Colchester United | 2–1 | Exeter City | 1 September 1965 |
| Crewe Alexandra | 2–0 | Southport | 1 September 1965 |
| Doncaster Rovers | 2–2 | Barnsley | 1 September 1965 |
| Hartlepools United | 1–0 | Bradford City | 1 September 1965 |
| Luton Town | 1–1 | Brighton & Hove Albion | 1 September 1965 |
| Lincoln City | 2–2 | York City | 1 September 1965 |
| Newport County | 2–2 | Southend United | 1 September 1965 |
| Notts County | 0–0 | Chesterfield | 1 September 1965 |
| Oldham Athletic | 3–2 | Tranmere Rovers | 1 September 1965 |
| Oxford United | 0–1 | Millwall | 1 September 1965 |
| Port Vale | 2–2 | Reading | 1 September 1965 |
| Queens Park Rangers | 1–1 | Walsall | 1 September 1965 |
| Scunthorpe United | 0–2 | Darlington | 1 September 1965 |
| Shrewsbury Town | 3–0 | Torquay United | 1 September 1965 |
| Stockport County | 2–3 | Workington | 1 September 1965 |
| Wrexham | 5–2 | Chester | 1 September 1965 |

=== Replays ===
| Home team | Score | Away team | Date |
|---|---|---|---|
| Aldershot | 2–1 | Bournemouth & Boscombe Athletic | 8 September 1965 |
| Barnsley | 1–2 | Doncaster Rovers | 7 September 1965 |
| Brighton & Hove Albion | 2–0 | Luton Town | 7 September 1965 |
| Chesterfield | 2–1 | Notts County | 8 September 1965 |
| Reading | 1–0 | Port Vale | 8 September 1965 |
| Rochdale | 3–1 | Barrow | 8 September 1965 |
| Southend United | 3–1 | Newport County | 6 September 1965 |
| Walsall | 3–2 | Queens Park Rangers | 7 September 1965 |
| York City | 4–2 | Lincoln City | 7 September 1965 |

== Second round ==
=== Ties ===
| Home team | Score | Away team | Date |
|---|---|---|---|
| Blackburn Rovers | 0–1 | Northampton Town | 21 September 1965 |
| Blackpool | 5–2 | Gillingham | 22 September 1965 |
| Bolton Wanderers | 3–0 | Aldershot | 22 September 1965 |
| Brighton & Hove Albion | 1–2 | Ipswich Town | 21 September 1965 |
| Bristol Rovers | 3–3 | West Ham United | 21 September 1965 |
| Bury | 0–2 | Huddersfield Town | 21 September 1965 |
| Charlton Athletic | 4–1 | Carlisle United | 21 September 1965 |
| Chesterfield | 3–0 | Bradford Park Avenue | 22 September 1965 |
| Colchester United | 2–4 | Middlesbrough | 22 September 1965 |
| Crewe Alexandra | 1–1 | Cardiff City | 22 September 1965 |
| Crystal Palace | 0–1 | Grimsby Town | 22 September 1965 |
| Darlington | 2–1 | Swindon Town | 22 September 1965 |
| Doncaster Rovers | 0–4 | Burnley | 22 September 1965 |
| Hull City | 2–2 | Derby County | 22 September 1965 |
| Leeds United | 4–2 | Hartlepool United | 22 September 1965 |
| Leyton Orient | 0–3 | Coventry City | 22 September 1965 |
| Manchester City | 3–1 | Leicester City | 22 September 1965 |
| Mansfield Town | 2–1 | Birmingham City | 22 September 1965 |
| Millwall | 4–1 | York City | 22 September 1965 |
| Newcastle United | 3–4 | Peterborough United | 22 September 1965 |
| Oldham Athletic | 1–2 | Portsmouth | 22 September 1965 |
| Preston North End | 1–0 | Plymouth Argyle | 22 September 1965 |
| Reading | 5–1 | Southend United | 22 September 1965 |
| Rotherham United | 2–0 | Watford | 22 September 1965 |
| Shrewsbury Town | 1–0 | Bristol City | 22 September 1965 |
| Southampton | 3–0 | Rochdale | 22 September 1965 |
| Stoke City | 2–1 | Norwich City | 22 September 1965 |
| Sunderland | 2–1 | Sheffield United | 22 September 1965 |
| Swansea Town | 2–3 | Aston Villa | 21 September 1965 |
| West Bromwich Albion | 3–1 | Walsall | 22 September 1965 |
| Workington | 0–0 | Brentford | 22 September 1965 |
| Wrexham | 1–2 | Fulham | 22 September 1965 |

=== Replays ===
| Home team | Score | Away team | Date |
|---|---|---|---|
| Brentford | 1–2 | Workington | 30 September 1965 |
| Cardiff City | 3–0 | Crewe Alexandra | 29 September 1965 |
| Derby County | 4–3 | Hull City | 29 September 1965 |
| West Ham United | 3–2 | Bristol Rovers | 29 September 1965 |

== Third round ==
=== Ties ===
| Home team | Score | Away team | Date |
|---|---|---|---|
| Blackpool | 1–2 | Darlington | 13 October 1965 |
| Burnley | 3–2 | Southampton | 13 October 1965 |
| Cardiff City | 2–0 | Portsmouth | 13 October 1965 |
| Chesterfield | 2–2 | Stoke City | 13 October 1965 |
| Derby County | 1–1 | Reading | 13 October 1965 |
| Fulham | 5–0 | Northampton Town | 13 October 1965 |
| Grimsby Town | 4–2 | Bolton Wanderers | 13 October 1965 |
| Huddersfield Town | 0–1 | Preston North End | 13 October 1965 |
| Leeds United | 2–4 | West Bromwich Albion | 13 October 1965 |
| Manchester City | 2–3 | Coventry City | 13 October 1965 |
| Middlesbrough | 0–0 | Millwall | 13 October 1965 |
| Peterborough United | 4–3 | Charlton Athletic | 13 October 1965 |
| Shrewsbury Town | 2–5 | Rotherham United | 13 October 1965 |
| Sunderland | 1–2 | Aston Villa | 13 October 1965 |
| West Ham United | 4–0 | Mansfield Town | 13 October 1965 |
| Workington | 1–1 | Ipswich Town | 13 October 1965 |

=== Replays ===
| Home team | Score | Away team | Date |
|---|---|---|---|
| Ipswich Town | 3–1 | Workington | 20 October 1965 |
| Millwall | 3–1 | Middlesbrough | 18 October 1965 |
| Reading | 2–0 | Derby County | 20 October 1965 |
| Stoke City | 2–1 | Chesterfield | 20 October 1965 |

== Fourth round ==
=== Ties ===
| Home team | Score | Away team | Date |
|---|---|---|---|
| Cardiff City | 5–1 | Reading | 3 November 1965 |
| Coventry City | 1–1 | West Bromwich Albion | 3 November 1965 |
| Fulham | 1–1 | Aston Villa | 3 November 1965 |
| Grimsby Town | 4–0 | Preston North End | 3 November 1965 |
| Ipswich Town | 2–0 | Darlington | 3 November 1965 |
| Millwall | 1–4 | Peterborough United | 3 November 1965 |
| Rotherham United | 1–2 | West Ham United | 3 November 1965 |
| Stoke City | 0–0 | Burnley | 3 November 1965 |

=== Replays ===
| Home team | Score | Away team | Date |
|---|---|---|---|
| Aston Villa | 2–0 | Fulham | 8 November 1965 |
| Burnley | 2–1 | Stoke City | 9 November 1965 |
| West Bromwich Albion | 6–1 | Coventry City | 10 November 1965 |

== Fifth round ==
=== Ties ===
| Home team | Score | Away team | Date |
|---|---|---|---|
| Cardiff City | 2–1 | Ipswich Town | 17 November 1965 |
| Grimsby Town | 2–2 | West Ham United | 17 November 1965 |
| Peterborough United | 4–0 | Burnley | 17 November 1965 |
| West Bromwich Albion | 3–1 | Aston Villa | 17 November 1965 |

=== Replays ===
| Home team | Score | Away team | Date |
|---|---|---|---|
| West Ham United | 1–0 | Grimsby Town | 15 December 1965 |

== Semi-finals ==
=== First leg ===
| Home team | Score | Away team | Date |
|---|---|---|---|
| West Bromwich Albion | 2–1 | Peterborough United | 1 December 1965 |
| West Ham United | 5–2 | Cardiff City | 20 December 1965 |

=== Second leg ===
| Home team | Score | Away team | Date | Agg |
|---|---|---|---|---|
| Cardiff City | 1–5 | West Ham United | 2 February 1966 | 3–10 |
| Peterborough United | 2–4 | West Bromwich Albion | 15 December 1965 | 3–6 |

== Final ==
9 March 1966

| West Ham United | 2 – 1 (0–0) | West Bromwich Albion |
|---|---|---|
| Byrne; Moore | Summary | Astle |

Boleyn Ground, London
Attendance: 28,341
Referee: D. Smith

West Ham United: Standen, Burnett, Burkett, Peters, Brown, Moore, Brabrook, Boyce, Byrne, Hurst, Dear

West Bromwich Albion: Potter, Cram, Fairfax, Fraser, Campbell, Williams, Brown, Astle, Kaye, Lovett, Clark

23 March 1966

| West Bromwich Albion | 4–1 (0–0) | West Ham United |
|---|---|---|
| Brown; Clark; Kaye; Williams | Summary | Peters |

The Hawthorns, West Bromwich
Attendance: 31,925
Referee: J Mitchell

West Bromwich Albion: Potter, Cram, Fairfax, Fraser, Campbell, Williams, Brown, Astle, Kaye, Hope, Clark

West Ham United: Standen, Burnett, Peters, Bovington, Brown, Moore, Brabrook, Boyce, Byrne, Hurst, Sissons

West Bromwich Albion win 5–3 on aggregate.
