= List of West Bromwich Albion F.C. managers =

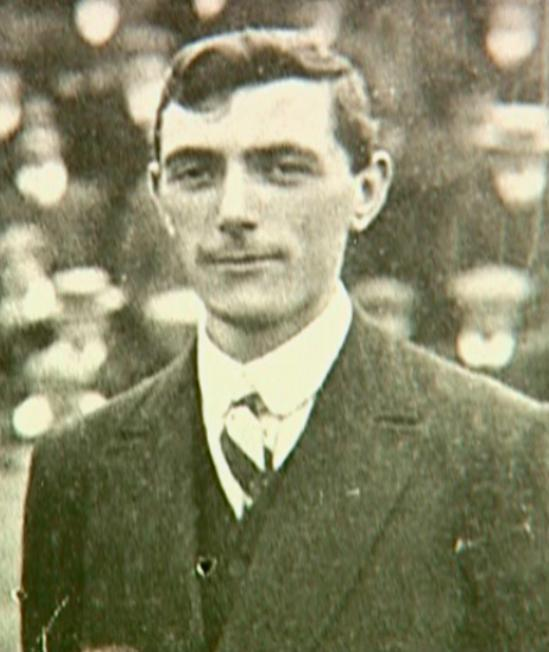
Fred Everiss was West Bromwich Albion's secretary-manager for a league record 46 years.

The following is a list of West Bromwich Albion managers from the founding of West Bromwich Albion F.C. in 1878 until the present. It includes both those who have been in permanent charge as well as caretaker managers.

All managers prior to 1948 were given the title secretary-manager, and dates for appointment of these should be taken only as approximate, although the years should be correct. The first secretary-manager was Louis Ford in 1890. Fred Everiss served as Albion's secretary-manager during 1902–1948, his 46 years in the post constituting a league record. A high turnover of managers at the club since then has meant that no-one has come close to this length of service, with 28 full-time managers having been appointed in the period 1948–2006.

The full-time post of manager was created in 1948, with Jack Smith the first to take up the position. Albion's longest serving full-time manager was Vic Buckingham, who led the club for six years and in 1953–54 guided the club to victory in the FA Cup and a runners-up spot in the league.

From the 2009–10 season the title of manager was changed to head coach.

== Managers and head coaches ==
Only competitive matches are counted. As of 1 February 2026.

Caretaker Manager

Name	Nationality	From	To	P	W	D	L	Win %	Honours	Notes
Louis Ford	England	1 August 1890	31 May 1892	58	18	10	30	31.03	see below	
Henry Jackson	England	1 August 1892	31 May 1894	62	26	9	27	41.94		
Edward Stephenson	England	1 August 1894	31 May 1895	36	14	5	17	38.89	see below	
Clement Keys	England	1 August 1895	31 May 1896	38	10	9	19	26.32		
Frank Heaven	England	1 August 1896	1 August 1902	214	86	45	83	40.19	see below	
Fred Everiss	England	1 August 1902	31 May 1948	1,520	656	331	533	43.16	see below	
Jack Smith	Wales	1 July 1948	30 April 1952	179	70	46	63	39.11	see below	
Jesse Carver	England	1 May 1952	1 February 1953	29	16	4	9	55.17		
Vic Buckingham	England	1 February 1953	31 May 1959	301	130	78	93	43.19	see below	
Gordon Clark	England	1 June 1959	1 October 1961	99	42	18	39	42.42		
Archie Macaulay	Scotland	1 October 1961	1 April 1963	67	26	18	23	38.81		
Jimmy Hagan	England	1 April 1963	31 May 1967	201	78	49	74	38.81	see below	
Alan Ashman	England	1 June 1967	1 June 1971	182	64	49	69	35.16	see below	
Don Howe	England	8 July 1971	7 April 1975	165	52	46	67	31.52		
Brian Whitehouse	England	7 April 1975	14 June 1975	3	2	0	1	66.67		
Johnny Giles (1st spell)	Ireland	5 July 1975	21 May 1977	85	36	27	22	42.35		
Ronnie Allen (1st spell)	England	21 June 1977	22 December 1977	22	11	7	4	50.00		
John Wile	England	23 December 1977	11 January 1978	4	1	1	2	25.00		
Ron Atkinson (1st spell)	England	12 January 1978	9 June 1981	159	70	53	36	44.03		
Ronnie Allen (2nd spell)	England	1 July 1981	1 May 1982	58	19	15	24	32.76		
Ron Wylie	Scotland	27 July 1982	13 February 1984	69	24	16	29	34.78		
Johnny Giles (2nd spell)	Ireland	14 February 1984	29 September 1985	74	24	15	35	32.43		
Nobby Stiles	England	29 September 1985	1 February 1986	21	3	8	10	14.29		
Ron Saunders	England	14 February 1986	2 September 1987	64	14	19	31	21.88		
Ron Atkinson (2nd spell)	England	3 September 1987	12 October 1988	53	15	15	23	28.30		
Brian Talbot	England	13 October 1988	1 November 1988	4	4	0	0	100.00		
Brian Talbot	England	2 November 1988	8 January 1991	114	34	39	41	29.82		
Stuart Pearson	England	9 January 1991	25 February 1991	6	2	1	3	33.33		
Bobby Gould	England	25 February 1991	5 May 1992	66	22	23	21	33.33		
Osvaldo Ardiles	Argentina	8 May 1992	19 June 1993	55	30	11	14	54.55	see below	
Keith Burkinshaw	England	19 June 1993	17 October 1994	64	15	19	30	23.44		
Alan Buckley	England	20 October 1994	22 January 1997	118	39	34	45	33.05		
Arthur Mann	Scotland	21 January 1997	5 February 1997	3	1	1	1	33.33		
Ray Harford	England	6 February 1997	4 December 1997	40	19	7	14	47.50		
Richie Barker	England	5 December 1997	12 December 1997	1	1	0	0	100.00		
John Trewick	England	13 December 1997	23 December 1997	2	0	0	2	0.00		
Denis Smith	England	24 December 1997	27 July 1999	73	22	20	31	30.14		
Cyrille Regis & John Gorman	England; Scotland	28 July 1999	2 August 1999	–	–	–	–	n/a		
Brian Little	England	3 August 1999	6 March 2000	41	8	18	15	19.51		
Cyrille Regis & Allan Evans	England; Scotland	7 March 2000	8 March 2000	1	1	0	0	100.00		
Gary Megson (1st spell)	England	9 March 2000	26 October 2004	221	94	50	77	42.53	see below	
Frank Burrows	Scotland	27 October 2004	8 November 2004	2	0	1	1	0.00		
Bryan Robson	England	9 November 2004	18 September 2006	81	19	24	38	23.46		
Nigel Pearson	England	19 September 2006	17 October 2006	4	3	1	0	75.00		
Craig Shakespeare	England	17 October 2006	17 October 2006	1	1	0	0	100.00		
Tony Mowbray	England	18 October 2006	16 June 2009	140	57	32	51	40.71	see below	
Roberto Di Matteo	Italy	30 June 2009	6 February 2011	82	40	19	23	48.78	see below	
Michael Appleton	England	6 February 2011	14 February 2011	1	0	1	0	0.00		
Roy Hodgson	England	14 February 2011	1 May 2012	54	20	13	21	37.04		
Steve Clarke	Scotland	12 June 2012	14 December 2013	60	19	15	26	31.67		
Keith Downing	England	14 December 2013	11 January 2014	6	1	3	2	16.67		
Pepe Mel	Spain	9 January 2014	12 May 2014	17	3	6	8	17.65		
Alan Irvine	Scotland	14 June 2014	29 December 2014	22	5	6	11	22.73		
Rob Kelly	England	29 December 2014	1 January 2015	1	0	1	0	0.00		
Tony Pulis	Wales	1 January 2015	20 November 2017	121	36	36	49	29.75		
Gary Megson (2nd spell)	England	20 November 2017	29 November 2017	2	0	2	0	0.00		
Alan Pardew	England	29 November 2017	2 April 2018	21	3	5	13	14.29		
Darren Moore	Jamaica	2 April 2018	9 March 2019	48	23	13	12	47.92		
Jimmy Shan	England	10 March 2019	13 June 2019	12	7	1	4	58.33		
Slaven Bilić	Croatia	13 June 2019	16 December 2020	65	26	22	17	40.00	see below	
Sam Allardyce	England	16 December 2020	23 May 2021	26	4	8	14	15.38		
Valérien Ismaël	France	24 June 2021	2 February 2022	31	12	9	10	38.71		
Steve Bruce	England	3 February 2022	10 October 2022	32	8	12	12	25.00		
Richard Beale	England	10 October 2022	24 October 2022	3	1	0	2	33.33		
Carlos Corberán	Spain	25 October 2022	24 December 2024	107	47	29	31	43.93		
Chris Brunt	Northern Ireland	24 December 2024	17 January 2025	6	1	3	2	16.67		
Tony Mowbray (2nd Spell)	England	17 January 2025	21 April 2025	18	5	5	8	27.78		
James Morrison (1st Spell)	Scotland	21 April 2025	3 May 2025	2	1	1	0	50.00		
Ryan Mason	England	2 June 2025	6 January 2026	27	9	5	13	33.33		
James Morrison (2nd Spell)	Scotland	6 January 2026	11 January 2026	1	0	1	0	0.00		
Eric Ramsay	Wales	11 January 2026	24 February 2026	9	0	4	5	0.00		

=== Combined record as manager ===
Name	Nationality	From	To	P	W	D	L	Win %
Johnny Giles	Ireland	5 July 1975	21 May 1977	85	36	27	22	42.35
Johnny Giles	Ireland	14 February 1984	29 September 1985	74	24	15	35	32.43
Johnny Giles	Ireland	Total		159	60	42	57	37.74
Ronnie Allen	England	21 June 1977	22 December 1977	22	11	7	4	50.00
Ronnie Allen	England	1 July 1981	1 May 1982	58	19	15	24	32.76
Ronnie Allen	England	Total		80	30	22	28	37.50
Ron Atkinson	England	12 January 1978	9 June 1981	159	70	53	36	44.03
Ron Atkinson	England	3 September 1987	12 October 1988	53	15	15	23	28.30
Ron Atkinson	England	Total		212	85	68	59	40.09
Brian Talbot	England	13 October 1988	1 November 1988	4	4	0	0	100.00
Brian Talbot	England	2 November 1988	8 January 1991	114	34	39	41	29.82
Brian Talbot	England	Total		118	38	39	41	32.20
Gary Megson	England	9 March 2000	26 October 2004	221	94	50	77	42.53
Gary Megson	England	20 November 2017	29 November 2017	2	0	2	0	0.00
Gary Megson	England	Total		223	94	52	77	42.15

== Managers with honours ==
Name	Nationality	Tenure		Honours
Louis Ford	England	1890	1892	1892 FA Cup
Edward Stephenson	England	1894	1895	1895 FA Cup runners-up
Frank Heaven	England	1896	1902	Div 2 winners 1901–02
Fred Everiss	England	1902	1948	Div 2 winners 1910–11; 1912 FA Cup runners-up Div 1 winners 1919–20; 1920 FA Charity Shield; Div 1 runners-up 1924–25; 1931 FA Cup; Div 2 runners-up 1930–31; 1931 FA Charity Shield runners-up 1935 FA Cup runners-up
Jack Smith	Wales	1948	1952	Div 2 runners-up 1948–49
Vic Buckingham	England	1953	1959	Div 1 runners-up 1953–54; 1954 FA Cup; 1954 FA Charity Shield shared
Jimmy Hagan	England	1963	1967	1966 League Cup; 1967 League Cup runners-up
Alan Ashman	England	1967	1971	1968 FA Cup; 1968 FA Charity Shield runners-up 1970 League Cup runners-up
Osvaldo Ardiles	Argentina	1992	1993	1993 Div 2 play-off winners
Gary Megson	England	2000	2004	Div 1 runners-up 2001–02; Div 1 runners-up 2003–04
Tony Mowbray	England	2006	2009	2007 Championship play-off runners-up Championship winners 2007–08
Roberto Di Matteo	Italy	2009	2011	Championship runners up 2009–10
Slaven Bilić	Croatia	2019	2020	Championship runners up 2019–20
