= List of Reading F.C. managers =

This is a list of all managers of Reading Football Club.

== Managerial history ==
As of match played 14 November 2026. Managers in italics were hired as interim or caretaker managers.

Name	From	To	Duration	P	W	D	L	Win %
Harry Marshall	23 February 1920	23 December 1920	304 days	19	6	2	11	31.58
(England) Jack Smith	23 December 1920	11 May 1922	1 year, 139 days	65	20	15	30	30.77
The Board	11 May 1922	1 January 1923	245 days	138	35	36	67	25.36
(England) Arthur Chadwick	1 January 1923	1 October 1925	2 years, 273 days	112	38	28	46	33.93
Harold Bray	1 October 1925	1 June 1926	243 days	38	20	10	8	52.63
(Scotland) Angus Wylie	1 July 1926	1 June 1931	4 years, 335 days	229	75	52	102	32.75
(England) Joe Smith	1 June 1931	1 August 1935	4 years, 61 days	184	92	49	43	50
(England) Billy Butler	1 August 1935	1 March 1939	3 years, 212 days	167	81	38	48	48.5
(Scotland) Johnny Cochrane	1 March 1939	13 April 1939	43 days	10	4	2	4	40
(England) Joe Edelston	13 April 1939	1 June 1947	8 years, 49 days	55	21	14	20	38.18
(England) Ted Drake	1 June 1947	1 June 1952	5 years, 0 days	234	114	46	74	48.72
(Wales) Arthur Smith	1 June 1952	1 October 1955	3 years, 122 days	164	59	38	67	35.98
Fred May; James Carter	1 October 1955	1 November 1955	31 days	10	3	1	6	30
(England) Harry Johnston	1 November 1955	1 January 1963	7 years, 61 days	356	143	76	137	40.17
(England) Roy Bentley	1 January 1963	1 February 1969	6 years, 31 days	322	136	79	107	42.24
(England) Ray Henderson	1 February 1969	1 April 1969	59 days	15	4	6	5	26.67
(England) Jack Mansell	1 April 1969	1 October 1971	2 years, 183 days	130	49	28	53	37.69
(England) Jimmy Wallbanks	1 October 1971	13 January 1972	104 days	12	6	1	5	50
(Republic of Ireland) Charlie Hurley	13 January 1972	26 February 1977	5 years, 44 days	284	108	82	94	38.03
(England) Maurice Evans	26 February 1977	31 January 1984	6 years, 339 days	334	133	93	108	39.82
(England) Ian Branfoot	31 January 1984	23 October 1989	5 years, 265 days	295	116	79	100	39.32
(England) Lew Chatterley	23 October 1989	14 November 1989	19 days	4	1	0	3	25
(Scotland) Ian Porterfield	14 November 1989	1 April 1991	1 year, 138 days	70	27	22	21	38.57
(Wales) Eddie Niedzwiecki	1 April 1991	30 April 1991	29 days	7	1	1	5	14.29
(England) John Haselden	30 April 1991	10 May 1991	10 days	2	0	0	2	0
(Scotland) Mark McGhee	10 May 1991	14 December 1994	3 years, 218 days	135	53	41	41	39.26
(Northern Ireland) Jimmy Quinn (England) Mick Gooding (England) Ady Williams (Wales) Jeff Hopkins	15 December 1994	4 January 1995	20 days	5	2	2	1	40
(Northern Ireland) Jimmy Quinn (England) Mick Gooding	5 January 1995	9 May 1997	2 years, 124 days	127	46	34	47	36.22
(England) Terry Bullivant	30 June 1997	18 March 1998	261 days	50	15	14	21	30
(England) Alan Pardew	18 March 1998	25 March 1998	7 days	1	0	0	1	0
(Scotland) Tommy Burns	25 March 1998	16 September 1999	1 year, 175 days	68	20	18	30	29.41
(England) Alan Pardew	16 September 1999	9 September 2003	3 years, 358 days	216	104	52	60	48.15
(England) Kevin Dillon	10 September 2003	9 October 2003	29 days	7	2	1	4	28.57
(England) Steve Coppell	9 October 2003	12 May 2009	5 years, 215 days	282	126	66	90	44.68
(Northern Ireland) Brendan Rodgers	4 June 2009	16 December 2009	195 days	23	6	6	11	26.09
(England) Brian McDermott	16 December 2009	11 March 2013	3 years, 85 days	152	70	41	41	46.05
(Republic of Ireland) Eamonn Dolan	11 March 2013	26 March 2013	15 days	1	0	0	1	0
(England) Nigel Adkins	26 March 2013	15 December 2014	1 year, 264 days	80	29	20	31	36.25
(Scotland) Steve Clarke	16 December 2014	4 December 2015	354 days	53	19	14	20	35.85
(England) Martin Kuhl	4 December 2015	17 December 2015	13 days	2	0	0	2	0
(England) Brian McDermott	17 December 2015	27 May 2016	175 days	30	9	8	13	30
(Netherlands) Jaap Stam	13 June 2016	21 March 2018	1 year, 281 days	98	40	23	35	40.82
(England) Paul Clement	23 March 2018	6 December 2018	258 days	30	7	8	15	23.33
(Scotland) Scott Marshall	6 December 2018	22 December 2018	16 days	3	0	1	2	0
(Portugal) José Gomes	22 December 2018	9 October 2019	291 days	38	9	14	15	23.68
(Wales) Mark Bowen	14 October 2019	29 August 2020	320 days	40	14	12	14	35
(Serbia) Veljko Paunović	29 August 2020	19 February 2022	1 year, 174 days	80	27	17	36	33.75
(Wales) Eddie Niedzwiecki	5 September 2020	5 September 2020	1 day	1	1	0	0	100
(Serbia) Marko Mitrović	2 November 2021	6 November 2021	4 days	2	1	0	1	50
(England) Paul Ince (Barbados) Michael Gilkes	19 February 2022	16 May 2022	86 days	14	4	3	7	28.57
(England) Paul Ince	16 May 2022	11 April 2023	330 days	44	14	8	22	31.82
(Republic of Ireland) Noel Hunt	11 April 2023	8 May 2023	27 days	5	0	3	2	0
(Spain) Rubén Sellés	26 June 2023	6 December 2024	1 year, 163 days	78	34	18	26	43.59
(Republic of Ireland) Noel Hunt	7 December 2024	26 October 2025	324 days	51	19	16	16	37.25
(England) Leam Richardson	28 October 2025		1 year, 17 days	55	21	16	18	38.18
