= K8 =

K8 or K-8 may refer to:

- K-8 (Kansas highway), two highways in Kansas, one in northern Kansas, one in southern Kansas
- K-8 school, a type of school that includes kindergarten and grades one through eight
- K8 telephone box, designed by Bruce Martin
- AMD K8, the internal designation for the first generation of AMD64-architecture microprocessors from AMD
- Hongdu JL-8 or K-8, a training aircraft
- Kaliningrad K-8 (AA-3 Anab), a Soviet missile
- Norrlands dragonregemente or K 8, a Swedish Army cavalry regiment
- Schleicher Ka 8, a single-seat glider
- Soviet submarine K-8
- Violin Sonata No. 3 (Mozart) K. 8, by Wolfgang Amadeus Mozart
- Zambia Skyways, IATA airline designator
- Kan Air, IATA airline designator (2010-2017)
- K8, a member of the Mazda K engine family
- LG K8, an LG K series mobile phone released in 2016
- K8 group, an online casino company
- Kubernetes, a software container orchestration system
- Kia K8, a South Korean car
- K8, the on-air branding of KAIT, a television station in Jonesboro, Arkansas

== See also ==
- 8K (disambiguation)
- Kate
