= Pascoe Bioletti =

Pascoe Bioletti (fl. 1913–1914) was an English criminal who attempted to influence the results of English football games. Pascoe's son, William Alfred Bioletti, was operator of a football betting business in Geneva.

In 1913, Bioletti approached West Bromwich Albion F.C. and England captain Jesse Pennington and offered £5 per player for Albion to endeavour not to win their forthcoming game against Everton F.C. on 29 November.

Pennington alerted the police and after the game, which ended in a draw, he met Bioletti, ostensibly for the pay-off, at which point the police moved in to arrest Bioletti, who was convicted and sentenced to 5 months' imprisonment in 1914.

Bioletti is also reputed to have approached Birmingham City F.C. captain Frank Womack.
