= Jesse Pennington =

English footballer

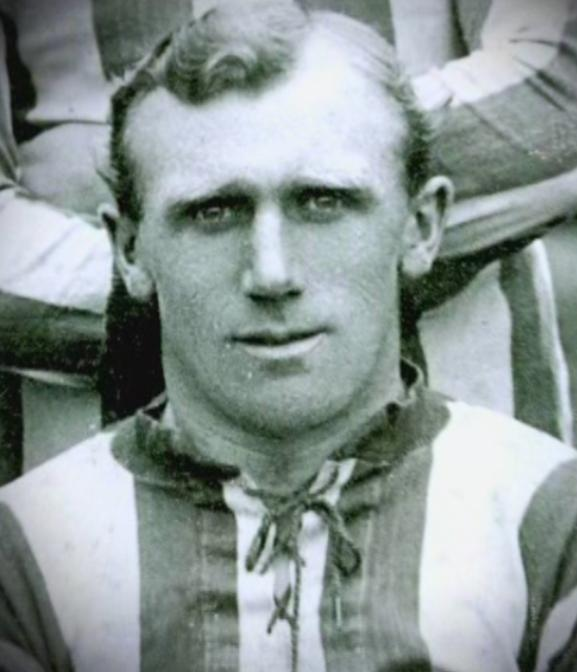
- Pennington in 1912

Personal information
- Date of birth: 23 August 1883
- Place of birth: West Bromwich, England
- Date of death: 5 September 1970 (aged 87)
- Place of death: Kidderminster, England
- Height: 5 ft 8 in (1.73 m)
- Position: Left-back

Senior career*
Years	Team	Apps	(Gls)
1903–1922	West Bromwich Albion	455	

International career
1907–1920	England	25	(0)
- * Club domestic league appearances and goals

Jesse Pennington (23 August 1883 – 5 September 1970) was an English footballer in the early part of the 20th century. He was nicknamed "Peerless Pennington".

== Career ==
Born in West Bromwich, Pennington was a left-back for West Bromwich Albion for 19 years, from March 1903 (aged 19) to May 1922 (aged 38). Although his career was interrupted by World War I, Pennington made 455 league appearances for the club, captaining them to the league title in 1919–1920. He had also been a part of the team promoted from the Second Division in 1911 and had received an FA Cup runners-up medal in 1912.

During World War I - from the ages of 30 to 35, and with regular league play suspended - Pennington was employed in Coventry to work in a munitions factory. While in the city he made a number of guest appearances for Coventry City in the 1918–19 Football League Midland Section, a temporary wartime division operating while the main league was suspended.

On the international front, Pennington earned 25 caps for England between 18 March 1907 and 10 April 1920, captaining the side in his last two matches. At the time of his final cap he was, at 36 years and 231 days, England's oldest capped outfield player. This record has since been exceeded by Stanley Matthews, Leslie Compton and Stuart Pearce.

After retiring, he worked as a scout for West Bromwich Albion from 1950 to 1960 and was made a life member of the club in 1969, a year before he died in Kidderminster. Pennington was named as one of West Bromwich Albion's 16 greatest players in a poll organised as part of the club's 125th anniversary celebrations in 2004.

Until the shop was bought by the Co-operative in 1934, Pennington also owned a fishing tackle shop at 33 Smethwick High Street, where his family had lived since 1911.

== The Bioletti scandal ==
In 1913, Pennington was approached by Pascoe Bioletti who offered £5 per player for Albion corruptly to endeavour not to win their forthcoming game against Everton on 29 November. Pascoe's son, William Alfred Bioletti, was operator of a football betting business in Geneva.

Pennington alerted the police and after the game, which ended in a draw, he met Bioletti, ostensibly for the payoff, at which point the police moved in to arrest Bioletti. Bioletti was sentenced to five months' imprisonment in 1914.

== Honours ==
West Bromwich Albion

- Football League First Division: 1919–20
- Football League Second Division: 1901-02, 1910-11
- FA Cup: runner-up: 1912
- FA Charity Shield: 1920
