= 8K =

8K or 8k may stand for:

- 8K resolution
  - 8K UHDTV, a digital video format
- 8 K, the quantity 8 kelvins
- 8000 (number), a natural number
- Form 8-K, a United States Securities and Exchange Commission shareholder notification form for key corporate changes
- 8,000 metres or 8K, a common running race distance
- Eight-thousander, a class of tall mountains
- GCR Class 8K, a class of British 2-8-0 steam locomotive
- China Railways 8K, an Alstom-built electric locomotive
- K-Mile Air (IATA airline code)

== See also ==
- K8 (disambiguation)
