= Louis Ford =

English businessman, football administrator and football referee

Personal information
- Full name: Louis Ford
- Date of birth: c. 1845
- Place of birth: West Bromwich, England

Managerial career
- Years: Team
- 1890–1892: West Bromwich Albion
- late 1890s: Walsall F.C.
- 1914–1915: Leicester Fosse

Louis Ford (born c. 1845 in West Bromwich) was a businessman, football administrator and football referee.

Ford joined the committee of West Bromwich Albion in the late 1880s, serving as honorary financial secretary from 1887 to 1890. He performed the role of general secretary (manager) from 1890 to 1892, receiving an annual salary of £50 as Albion's first official, paid secretary. Ford also served as an FA councillor from 1890 to 1893 and was vice-president of The Football League from 1894 to 1897. He was the secretary of Walsall F.C. during the late 1890s, before becoming a league referee. From 1914 to 1915 he served as secretary at Leicester Fosse.
