= K8 Group =

Network of international online casinos and online gambling companies

K8
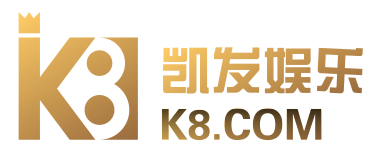
- Website type: Private
- Available in: Multilingual
- Headquarters: {{{location_country}}}
- Area served: International
- Industry: Online gambling
- Services: online sports betting, poker, casino, games
- Website: k8.com

K8 (also known as K8 entertainment group) is a network of international online casinos and online gambling companies, with over 15 million users. K8 has offices in almost 50 countries in the world; including the United Kingdom, The Philippines and Vietnam. K8 promotes itself by its sponsorships of UK premier league teams, West Bromwich Albion FC and Manchester City, and German football team FC Schalke 04.

== Overview ==
K8 operates like a virtual casino, offering slots, table games such as Black Jack, poker and roulette, live dealers and sports betting, for each one of their websites.

In Asia, their most popular sites are Vietnamese-based, K8vina and K8vn. K8 casino is licensed under First Cagayan Philippines, to operate live betting, and operates according to the rules promulgated by the Regulatory Authority.

Their European expansion began in November 2015, with the establishment of UK-K8, whose headquarters are located in Birmingham, UK. They are licensed by the UK Gambling Commission. UK-K8 is known for its use of the EveryMatrix’s platform to operate its website, the partnership was announced in early 2017, and was integrated in their affiliate program and also gambling solutions. To appeal to British users' needs, they also upgraded their sports betting with Golden Race platform, this means that bet settlement operations happen in real-time, due to Golden Race and EveryMatrix's sportsbook solutions, and has increased its reliability and usage amongst European users.

K8 used a variety of marketing methods to introduce UK-K8, most notably the sponsorships of Premier League football teams.

== Sponsorships ==
K8 was the main partner and sponsor for Kunlun fighting, a Chinese MMA event. Internationally, they are most well known for their football sponsorships, they also appointed German footballer, Michael Ballack as brand ambassador from 2015 to 2016, which coincided with their sponsorship of German football team FC Schalke 04.

In 2015, the online entertainment company became a sponsor of the Copa America in Chile, the third largest continental football event in the world.

In 2016, K8 became the kit sponsor for the West Bromwich Albion FC, a Premier League football team. This became the football team's biggest sponsorship to date, which reportedly cost K8 over £5 million. The partnership was mostly used as a marketing strategy to bring awareness to the European extension of the K8 group; UK-K8. The sponsorship deal lasted only one season.

June 21, 2017, K8 announced a sponsorship agreement with Premier League club Manchester City. The multi-year deal includes advertisements on digiboards at Manchester City's Etihad Stadium, and the right to offer trips and experiences to the public to meet the team.

September 26, 2017, K8 announced a sponsorship agreement with Championship club, Cardiff City. The multi-year deal includes betting booths at Cardiff City Stadium, and the right to offer trips, tickets and experiences to the public to meet the team.

November 1, 2024, K8 and Atlético de Madrid have reached a sponsorship agreement for the next two seasons.

== Controversies ==
K8 is part of the recurring theme of increasingly larger numbers of gambling companies sponsoring Premier League teams. In the 16/17 season, more than 50% of sponsorship shares were held by betting companies, K8 being one of them. Also including their competitors, Dafabet and Bet365. Many were skeptical of K8's decision to sponsor Manchester City FC, due to the UK government's decision to review the gambling sector, to prevent over exposure to gambling, and to prevent the increasing number of gambling addiction. which has increased by 0.3% over the past three years.

On the same day that K8 signed as a sponsor for Manchester City, UK's Football Association announced that it will end all partnerships with betting companies, in light of recent betting incidents and to combat addictions.
