= Frank Heaven =

English cricketer and football administrator

W. Frank Heaven (1873 – 26 December 1905) was a cricketer and football administrator.

Heaven was born in Edgbaston, Birmingham and was educated at Camp Hill Grammar School. He was a keen cricketer and played for a number of clubs, including Warwickshire Club and Ground and Smethwick CC. On 25 August 1896 he was appointed as secretary (manager) of West Bromwich Albion, his annual salary starting at £104. He became Albion's general financial secretary in June 1897, and helped to oversee the club's move to their new ground, The Hawthorns, in the summer of 1900. In May 1902 he was asked to resign his post following a disagreement over policy with Albion's directors. After a two-year hiatus from football he served as secretary of Third Lanark in 1904-05. He died in Worcester in 1905.
