= Henry Jackson (football manager) =

English football secretary-manager and director

Henry 'Swin' Jackson (born c. 1850) was an English football secretary-manager and director. He joined West Bromwich Albion's first board of directors in 1891. He served the club as general secretary-manager from 1892 to 1894, remaining as a director for much of that period. Jackson later joined Leicester Fosse as secretary. He died in 1930.
