= Alan Ashman =

English footballer and manager (1928–2002)

Personal information
- Full name: George Alan Ashman
- Date of birth: 30 May 1928
- Place of birth: Rotherham, West Riding of Yorkshire, England
- Date of death: 30 November 2002 (aged 74)
- Place of death: Walsall, England
- Position: Centre forward

Senior career*
Years	Team	Apps	(Gls)
- Sheffield United
- Nottingham Forest
1951–1957	Carlisle United	214	(98)

Managerial career
- 1963–1967: Carlisle United
- 1967–1971: West Bromwich Albion
- 1971–1972: Olympiacos
- 1972–1975: Carlisle United
- 1975–1977: Workington
- 1978–1979: Walsall
- * Club domestic league appearances and goals

George Alan Ashman (30 May 1928 – 30 November 2002) was an English association footballer, best remembered for some notable managerial successes.

== Playing career ==
Born in Rotherham, West Riding of Yorkshire, Ashman had an undistinguished amateur playing career with Sheffield United and Nottingham Forest during the ad hoc competitions of the Second World War.

In 1951, he signed for Carlisle United for whom he made 214 appearances, scoring 98 goals. In 1958, suffering from cartilage damage, he retired from playing to manage the poultry farm of one of the club's directors. As a recreation, he managed amateur team Penrith and when Third Division Carlisle found themselves in need of a manager in February 1963, the club offered Ashman the job. During his playing career he played cricket for Cumberland in the 1956 Minor Counties Championship.

In 2009 Ashman was named at 18th in a list of Carlisle United's top 100 players, compiled by local newspaper the News and Star.

== Management career ==
Ashman was too late to prevent that season's relegation but the following season saw a bounce back, and the season after that, the Third Division championship. Leading Division Two for much of the 1966–67 season, the club was disappointed to miss out on promotion by finishing third.

Ashman's exploits had not gone unnoticed and, in 1967, he joined West Bromwich Albion, leading them in a series of exciting cup runs, crowned by victory in the 1968 FA Cup. His new club was, however, impatient for further trophies and he was dismissed in 1971, hearing of the news from a waiter while on holiday in Greece.

Somewhat ironically, he went on to manage Olympiakos before returning to Carlisle in August 1972, leading the club to the First Division and a brief spell at the top of the entire English league.

The heights were short-lived and Ashman left the club to manage Workington from 1975 to 1977 and Walsall before settling for junior coaching and scouting roles at Derby County, Hereford United and Swallows of Walsall. He died in 2002 in Walsall. A minute's silence was held in his honour prior to West Bromwich Albion's home match against Sunderland.

== Honours ==
=== Manager ===
Carlisle United

- Football League Third Division: 1964–65

West Bromwich Albion

- FA Cup: 1967–68
- Football League Cup runner-up: 1969–70

Olympiacos

- Greater Greece Cup: 1972
