= Jack Smith (footballer, born 1885) =

English footballer

Personal information
- Full name: John Smith
- Date of birth: 1885
- Place of birth: Fulwood, England
- Position: Right back

Senior career*
Years	Team	Apps	(Gls)
1906–1907	Moor Park		
1907–1908	Blackburn Rovers	0	(0)
1908–1910	Portsmouth		
1910–1921	Reading	230	

Managerial career
- 1920–1922: Reading
- * Club domestic league appearances and goals

John Smith was an English professional footballer who made over 230 appearances in the Southern and Football Leagues for Reading as a right back. He captained the club and later served as manager.

== Honours ==
Reading

- Southern League Second Division: 1910–11

Individual

- Reading Hall of Fame
