= Edward Stephenson (footballer) =

English football manager and secretary

Edward Stephenson (born c. 1852 in West Bromwich) was an English football secretary-manager, who performed that role at West Bromwich Albion from November 1894 to January 1895. He was dismissed from the post for incompetence.
