= 1920 FA Charity Shield =

- Event: FA Charity Shield
West Bromwich Albion	Tottenham Hotspur
2	0
- Date: 15 May 1920
- Venue: White Hart Lane, London
- Attendance: 38,168

The 1920 FA Charity Shield was a football match played on 15 May 1920 between the winners of the two divisions of the Football League in 1919–20. It was the seventh FA Charity Shield match and was contested by First Division champions West Bromwich Albion and Second Division champions Tottenham Hotspur. The match was played at Tottenham's home ground, White Hart Lane. Albion won 2–0 in what is their only outright Charity Shield victory to date (they shared the shield in 1954 after drawing with Wolverhampton Wanderers).

This was the first Charity Shield match since 1913; the competition had not taken place during the intervening period because of the First World War.

== Match details ==
West Bromwich Albion: H Pearson, J Smith, J Pennington, S Richardson, S Bowser, R McNeal, J Crisp, A Smith, A Bentley, F Morris, H Gregory.

Tottenham Hotspur: W Jacques, T Clay, R Brown, J Archibald, B Smith, A Grimsdell, J Banks, J Seed, J Cantrell, H Bliss, J Dimmock.

A Smith scored both goals for West Brom

15 May 1920

West Bromwich Albion	2–0	Tottenham Hotspur
Smith,

White Hart Lane, London
Attendance: 38,168
