= West Bromwich Albion F.C. =

Association football club in West Bromwich, England

West Bromwich Albion
- Full name: West Bromwich Albion Football Club
- Nicknames: The Baggies; The Throstles; The Albion
- Short name: WBA; West Brom; Albion
- Founded: 1878; 148 years ago
- Ground: The Hawthorns
- Capacity: 26,688
- Owner: Bilkul Football WBA
- Chairman: Shilen Patel
- Head coach: James Morrison
- League: EFL Championship
- 2025–26: EFL Championship, 21st of 24
- Website: wba.co.uk
Home colours	Away colours	Third colours

West Bromwich Albion Football Club (/ˈbrɒmɪdʒ, -ɪtʃ/), commonly known as West Brom, The Baggies or The Albion, is a professional association football club based in West Bromwich, West Midlands, England. They compete in the EFL Championship, the second level of the English football league. The club was formed in 1878 and has played at its home ground, The Hawthorns, since 1900.

Albion were a founder member of the Football League in 1888, the first professional football league in the world. The club has spent the majority of its existence in the top tier of English football, where it has played for 82 seasons, most recently competing in the Premier League in 2021. They have been champions of England once, in 1919–20, and have been runner-up twice, in 1924–25 and 1953–54. Albion have reached ten FA Cup finals and won the Cup on five occasions. The first win came in 1888, the year the league was founded, followed by wins in 1892, 1931, 1954 and most recently in 1968, the club's last major trophy. Albion also won the Football League Cup at the first attempt in 1966, and have reached a further two finals. The club's longest continuous period in the top division spanned 24 years between 1949 and 1973, and from 1986 to 2002 it had its longest spell out of the top division.

The team have played in navy blue and white stripes for most of the club's history, and the club badge features a throstle perched on a hawthorn branch. Albion have long-standing rivalries with their traditional rivals being Aston Villa and Wolverhampton Wanderers. Albion contest the Black Country derby with the latter.

== History ==
=== Early years (1878–1950) ===
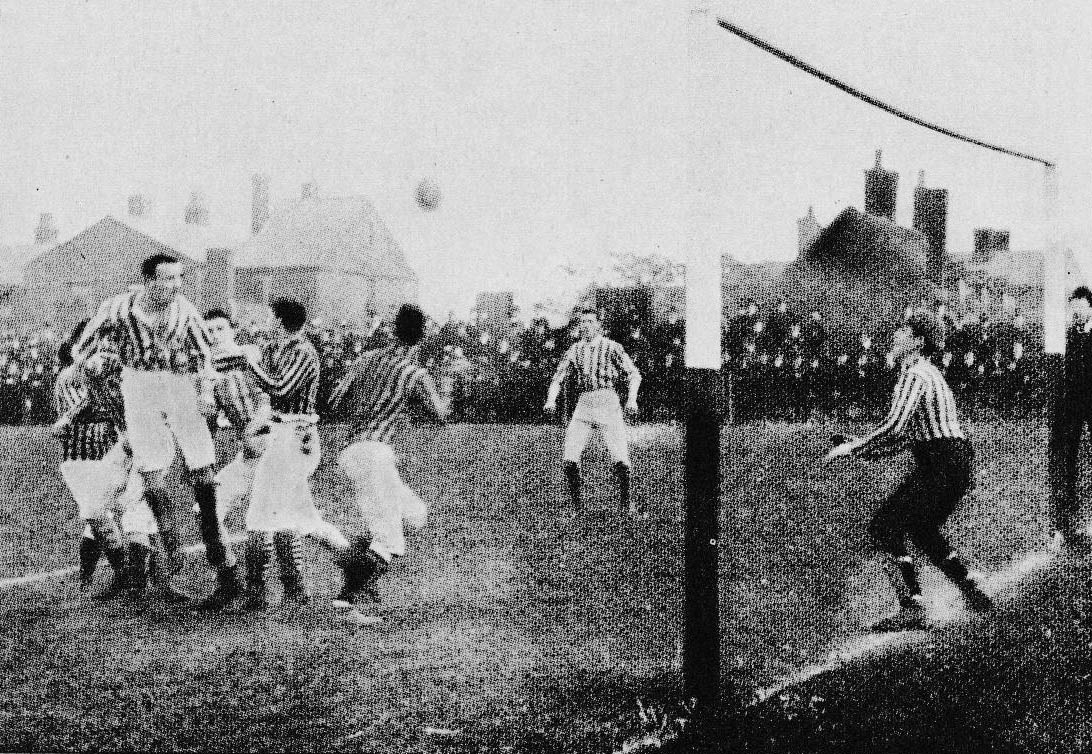
West Bromwich Albion competing in the 1887 FA Cup Final

The club was founded as West Bromwich Strollers in 1878 by workers from George Salter's Spring Works in West Bromwich, in the Black Country.^{[A]} They were renamed West Bromwich Albion in 1880; Albion was a district of West Bromwich where some of the players lived or worked, close to what is today Greets Green. Local rivals Walsall Albion may have been the first football team to adopt the Albion suffix, initially as a cricket club, before they disappeared from the record in 1882.

West Brom joined the Birmingham & District Football Association in 1881 and became eligible for their first competition, the Birmingham Cup. They reached the quarter-finals, beating several longer-established clubs on the way. In 1883, Albion won their first trophy, the Staffordshire Cup. Albion joined the Football Association in the same year; this enabled them to enter the FA Cup for the first time in the 1883–84 season. In 1885 the club turned professional, and in 1886 the team reached the FA Cup final for the first time, losing 2–0 to Blackburn Rovers in a replay. They reached the final again in 1887, but lost 2–0 to Aston Villa. In 1888 the team won the trophy for the first time, beating strong favourites Preston North End 2–1 in the final. As FA Cup winners, they qualified to play in a Football World Championship game against Scottish Cup winners Renton, which ended in a 4–1 defeat.

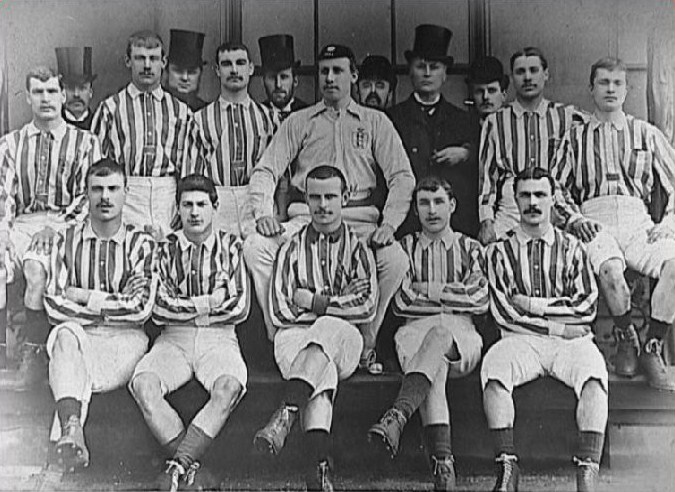
The Albion team of 1888, FA Cup winners and Football League founder members

In March 1888, William McGregor wrote to what he considered to be the top five English teams, including Albion, informing them of his intention to form an association of clubs that would play each other home and away each season. Thus when the Football League started later that year, Albion became one of the twelve founder members. Albion's second FA Cup success came in 1892, beating Aston Villa 3–0. They met Villa again in the 1895 final, but lost 1–0. The team suffered relegation to Division Two in 1900–01, their first season at The Hawthorns. They were promoted as champions the following season but relegated again in 1903–04. The club won the Division Two championship once more in 1910–11, and the following season reached another FA Cup Final, where they were defeated by Second Division Barnsley in a replay.

Albion won the Football League title in 1919–20 for the only time in their history following the end of World War I, their totals of 104 goals and 60 points both breaking the previous league records. The team finished as Division One runners-up in 1924–25, narrowly losing out to Huddersfield Town, but were relegated in 1926–27. In 1930–31, they won promotion as well as the FA Cup, beating Birmingham 2–1 in the final. The "double" of winning the FA Cup and promotion has not been achieved before or since. Albion reached the final again in 1935, losing to Sheffield Wednesday, but were relegated three years later. They gained promotion in 1948–49, and there followed the club's longest unbroken spell in the top flight of English football, a total of 24 years.

=== Success and decline (1950–1992) ===
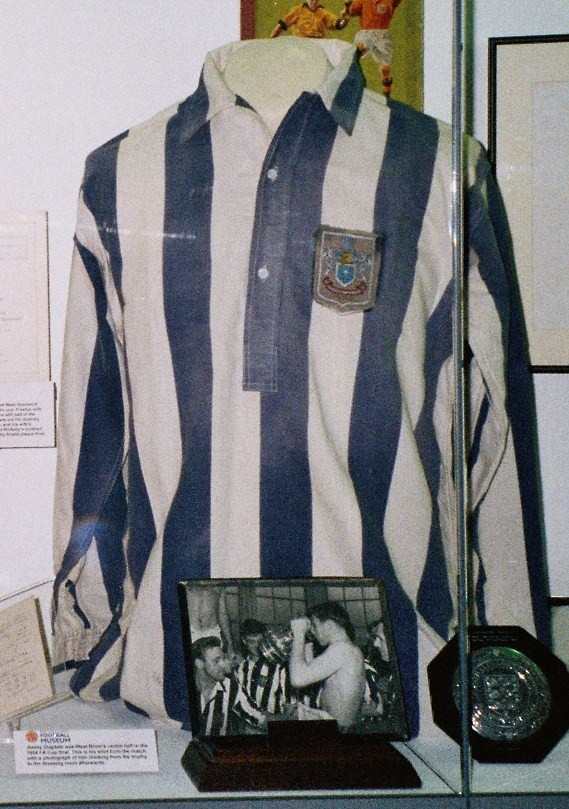
Memorabilia from the 1954 FA Cup Final

In 1953–54, Albion came close to being the first team in the 20th century to win the League and Cup double. They succeeded in winning the FA Cup, beating Preston North End 3–2, but injuries and a loss of form towards the end of the season meant that they finished as runners-up to fierce rivals Wolverhampton Wanderers in the league. Nonetheless, Albion became known for their brand of fluent, attacking football, with the 1953–54 side being hailed as the "Team of the Century". One national newspaper went so far as to suggest that the team be chosen en masse to represent England at the 1954 FIFA World Cup finals. They remained one of the top English sides for the remainder of the decade, reaching the semi-final of the 1957 FA Cup and achieving three consecutive top five finishes in Division One between 1957–58 and 1959–60.

Although their league form was less impressive during the 1960s, the second half of the decade saw West Brom establish a reputation as a successful cup side. Albion entered the Football League Cup for the first time in 1965–66 and, under manager Jimmy Hagan, won the final by defeating West Ham United 5–3 on aggregate. That was the last two-legged final and, the following year, Albion reached the final again, the first played at Wembley. They lost 3–2 to Third Division Queens Park Rangers after being 2–0 up at half-time. Albion's cup form continued under Hagan's successor Alan Ashman. He guided the club to their last major trophy to date, the 1968 FA Cup, when they beat Everton in extra time thanks to a single goal from Jeff Astle. Albion reached the FA Cup semi-final and European Cup Winners Cup quarter-final in 1969, and were defeated 2–1 by Manchester City in the 1970 League Cup Final.

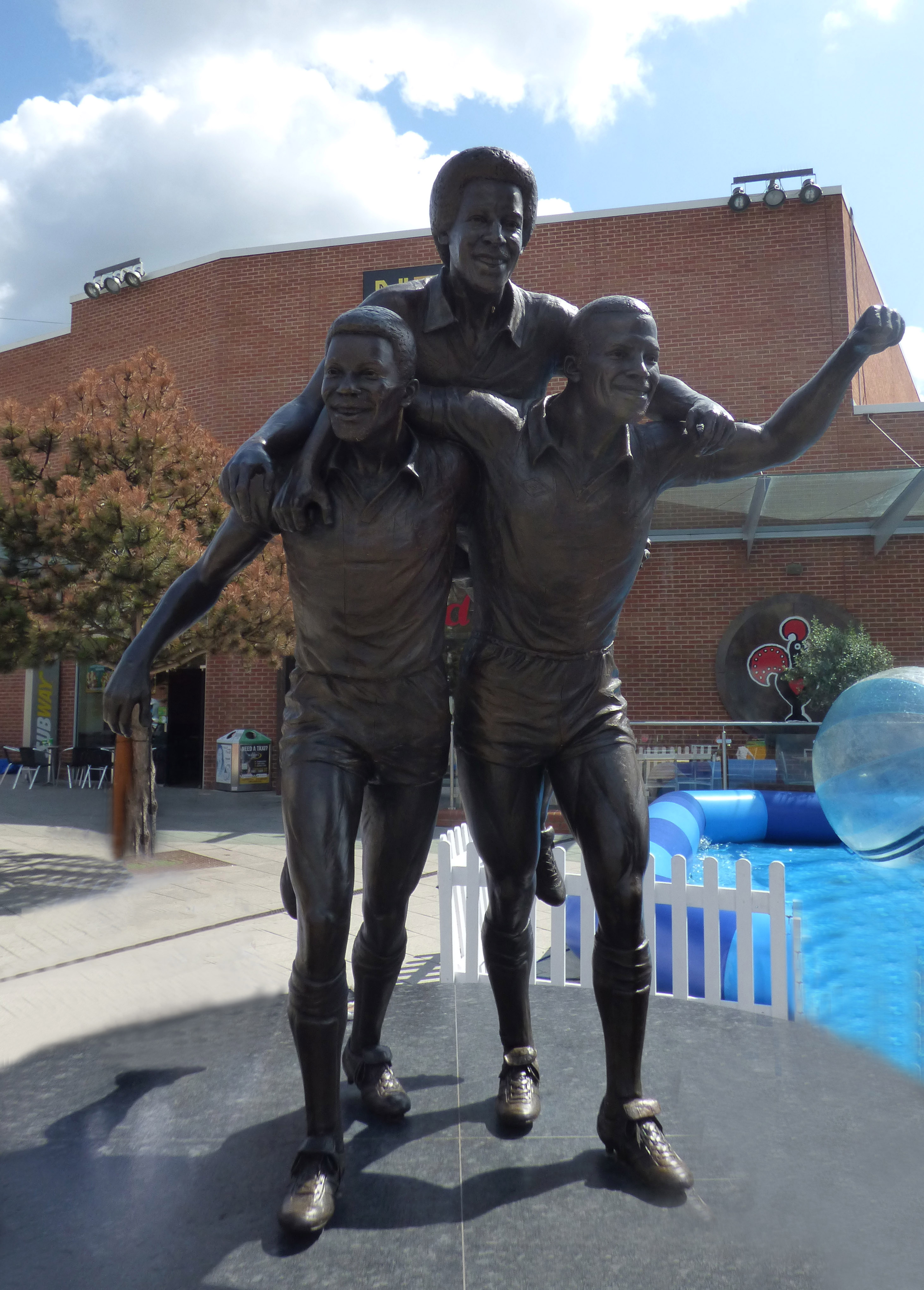
Statue of the Three Degrees by Graham Ibbeson, in West Bromwich

The club were less successful during the reign of Don Howe, and were relegated to Division Two at the end of 1972–73, but gained promotion three years later under the guidance of player-manager Johnny Giles. Under Ron Atkinson, Albion reached the 1978 FA Cup semi-final but lost to Ipswich Town. In May of that year, Albion became the first English professional team to play in China, going unbeaten on their five-game trip. In 1978–79, the team finished third in Division One, their highest placing for over 20 years, and also reached the UEFA Cup quarter-final, where they were defeated by Red Star Belgrade. The team around this time was notable for simultaneously fielding three black players: Cyrille Regis, Laurie Cunningham and Brendon Batson; and is considered to be an integral part of the acceptance of black footballers in the English leagues. In his second spell as manager, Ronnie Allen guided the team to both domestic cup semi-finals in 1981–82. The mid-1980s saw the start of Albion's longest and deepest decline. They were relegated in 1985–86 with the worst record in the club's history, beginning a period of 16 years outside the top flight. Five years later, the club were relegated to the Third Division for the first and only time.

=== Recent years (1992–present) ===
Chart of historic table positions of West Bromwich Albion in the Football League

Albion had spent the majority of their history in the top-flight of English football, but when the Premier League was founded in 1992 the club found themselves in the third tier, which had been renamed Division Two. In 1992–93, Albion finished fourth and entered the play-offs for the first time. Albion's first appearance at Wembley for over 20 years – and their last at the original stadium – saw them beat Port Vale 3–0 to return to the second level – now renamed the First Division. Manager Ossie Ardiles then joined Tottenham Hotspur, however, and a succession of managers over the next few seasons saw Albion consolidate their Division One status without mounting a serious promotion challenge.

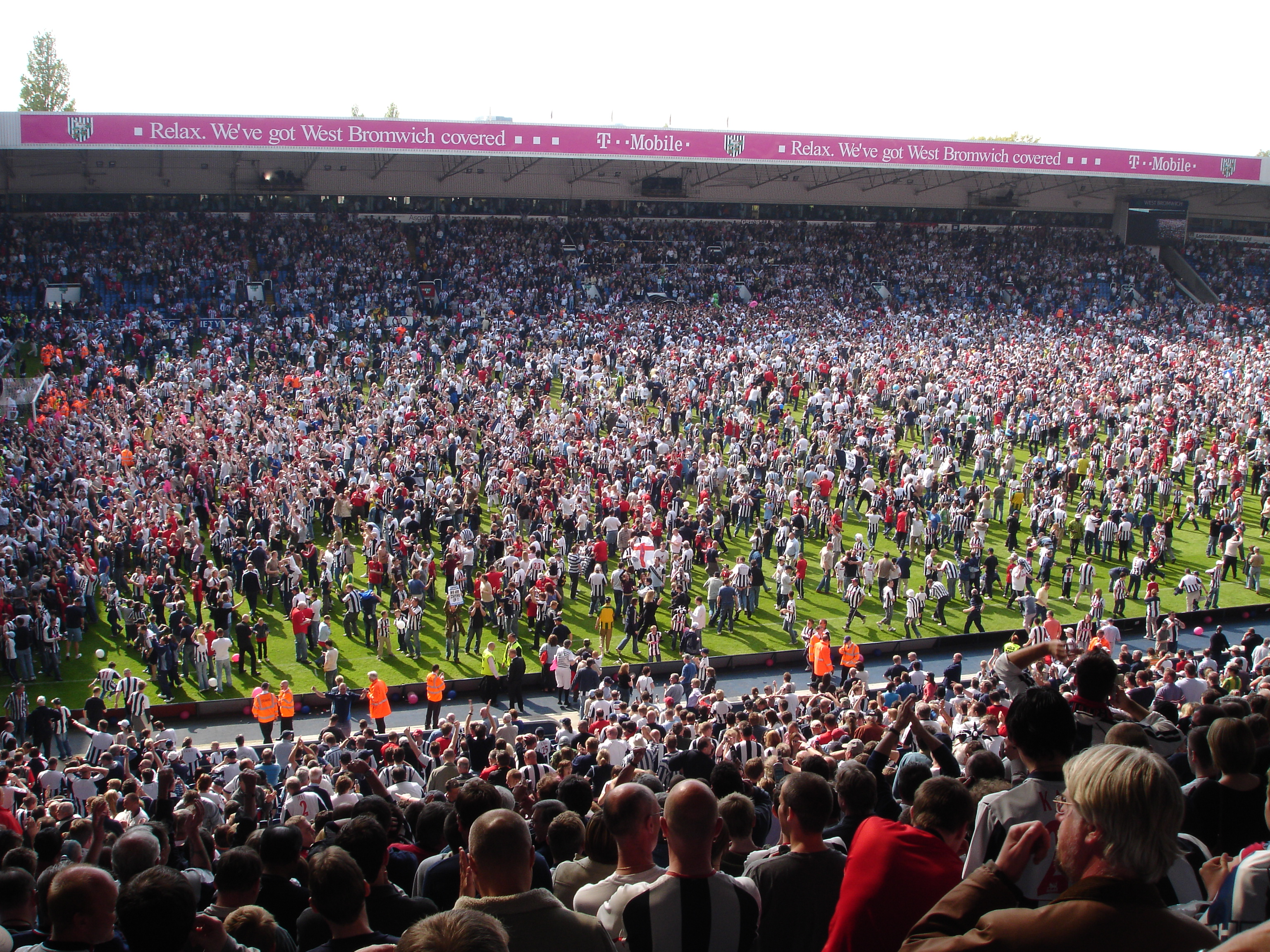
Crowd scenes following The Great Escape, 15 May 2005. Fans enter the pitch after the club survived relegation having been in last place on the final day of the season.

The appointment of Gary Megson in March 2000 heralded an upturn in the club's fortunes. Megson guided Albion to Division One safety in 1999–2000, and to the play-offs a year later. He went on to lead the club to promotion to the Premier League in 2001–02. After being relegated in their first Premier League season, they made an immediate return to the top flight in 2003–04. In 2004–05, Megson's successor, former Albion midfielder Bryan Robson, led the team to a last-day "Great Escape", when Albion became the first Premier League club to avoid relegation having been bottom of the table at Christmas, as well as bottom on the final day of the season.^{[G]} They failed to avoid the drop the following season, and Robson was replaced by Tony Mowbray in October 2006. The club competed in the Championship play-off final at Wembley Stadium on 28 May 2007, but lost 1–0 to Derby County. The following season, Mowbray led the Baggies to Wembley again, this time in the semi-finals of the FA Cup, where they lost 1–0 to Portsmouth. One month later, Albion were promoted to the Premier League as winners of the Championship, but were relegated at the end of the 2008–09 campaign. Mowbray left the club and was replaced by Roberto Di Matteo, who led the club back to the Premier League at the first attempt, but was dismissed in February 2011 and replaced by Roy Hodgson.

Hodgson guided Albion to an 11th-place finish for the 2010–11 season. Then followed an eight-season continuous run in the Premier League. It included an 8th-place finish in 2012–13 under Steve Clarke, and 10th-place finishes under Roy Hodgson in 2011–12 and Tony Pulis in 2016–17. In August 2016, it was announced that long-term owner Jeremy Peace had sold the club to a Chinese investment group headed up by Lai Guochuan. By this time, the club had begun to fall into a state of torpor, and were relegated at the end of the 2017–18 season, ending their eight-year Premier League stay. Pulis and his replacement Alan Pardew were both dismissed during the season. Albion finished fourth in their first season back in the Championship under the management of Darren Moore, losing the Championship play-off semi-final on penalties.

Slaven Bilić took over as manager in June 2019, and led Albion to automatic promotion back to the Premier League during the 2019–20 season. Back in the Premier League, Bilić was controversially sacked on 16 December 2020, with Sam Allardyce named as his replacement the same day. After Albion were relegated from the Premier League at the end of the 2020–21 season, Allardyce resigned from his position. The club endured disappointing results back in the Championship during the tenures of Valérien Ismaël and Steve Bruce, who left the club in the relegation places in the 2022–23 season. Carlos Corberán was named as successor on 25 October 2022. He guided Albion to a 5th-place finish and the play-off semi-finals at the end of the 2023–24 season. The club maintained a play-off position for much of the following season; Corberán left the club on Christmas Eve 2024 to join Valencia, and Tony Mowbray returned as manager in January 2025, but he lasted just three months, as Albion's promotion push dwindled to an eventual 9th-place finish.

Ryan Mason was appointed head coach ahead of the 2025–26 season, but won just a third of his games in charge before being fired in January 2026. His successor, Eric Ramsay, lasted nine games, with no wins; James Morrison then took over on an interim basis for the rest of the season. On 24 April 2026, the club suffered a two-point deduction for a breach of the EFL's profit and sustainability rules, then retained their Championship place the following day, and Morrison was named West Brom's new permanent boss.

== Crest and colours ==
=== Badge ===
West Bromwich Albion club badge c. 1900–2006

Albion's main club badge dates back to the late 1880s, when club secretary Tom Smith suggested that a throstle (song thrush) sitting on a crossbar be adopted for the badge.^{[B]} The people of West Bromwich had often been referred to as Throstles. The reason for this was a jokey reference to the sound of donkeys kept on the heath. People of Birmingham at the same time were referred to as "Buttons". FW Hackwood's History of West Bromwich has further details as do many contemporary newspaper reports of the 1880s. The badge has been subject to various revisions since then. It has always featured a throstle, usually on a blue and white striped shield, although the crossbar was replaced with a hawthorn branch at some point after the club's move to the Hawthorns. As late as the 1930s, a caged throstle was placed beside the touchline during matches and it was said that it only used to sing if Albion were winning. In 1979, an effigy of a throstle was erected above the half-time scoreboard of the Woodman corner at the Hawthorns, and was returned to the same area of the ground following redevelopment in the early 2000s.

In 1975, a version of the badge (on a roundel rather than a shield) was granted by the College of Arms to the Football League for licensing to the club. The badge was described in heraldic blazon as, "On a roundel paly of thirteen argent and azure a mistle thrush perched on a raspberry branch leaved and fructed proper." This is the only known occasion on which the branch has been described as a raspberry branch rather than a hawthorn branch: Rodney Dennys, the officer of arms responsible, may have been imperfectly briefed.

The badge was re-designed in 2006, incorporating the name of the club for the first time. The new design aimed to safeguard and consolidate the club's identity. Prior to this, the main club badge rarely coincided with that worn on the first team strip. No badge appeared on the kit for most of the club's history, although the Stafford knot featured on the team jerseys for part of the 1880s. The West Bromwich town arms were worn on the players' shirts for the 1931, 1935 and 1954 FA Cup finals. The town's Latin motto, "Labor omnia vincit", translates as "labour conquers all things" or "work conquers all". The town arms were revived as the shirt badge from 1994 until 2000,^{[C]} with the throstle moved to the collar of the shirts.

Albion's first regular shirt badge appeared in the late 1960s and early 1970s where it was blue. Although it featured the throstle, it did not include the blue and white striped shield of the club badge. A similar design was also used during the late 1980s and early 1990s. In the mid-1970s, a more abstract version of the throstle was used on the club's shirts, while in the late 1970s through to the mid-1980s, an embroidered WBA logo was displayed, a common abbreviation of the club's name in print. Not until the early 21st century did the full club badge appear on the team's shirts.

=== Colours ===
Albion's strip from 1882 to 1883 was one of many variations worn during the 1880s. Note that the actual kit had long sleeves.
Albion's most common away colours during the late 20th and early 21st century.

West Brom have played in navy blue and white striped shirts for the majority of their existence, usually with white shorts and white socks. The team is occasionally referred to as the Stripes by supporters. A number of different colours were trialled during the club's formative years however, including cardinal red and blue quarters in 1880–81, yellow and white quarters in 1881–82, chocolate and blue halves in 1881–82 and 1882–83, red and white hoops in 1882–83, chocolate and white in 1883–84 and cardinal red and blue halves in 1884–85. The blue and white stripes made their first appearance in the 1885–86 season, although at that time they were of a lighter shade of blue; the navy blue stripes did not appear until after the First World War. For the regional leagues played during the Second World War, Albion were forced to switch to all-blue shirts, as rationing meant that striped material was considered a luxury.

Like all football clubs, Albion sport a secondary or "change" strip when playing away from home against a team whose colours clash with their own. As long ago as the 1890s, and throughout much of the club's early history, a change strip of white jerseys with black shorts was worn. The away shirt additionally featured a large 'V' during the First World War. In the 1935 FA Cup Final, however, when both of Albion and Sheffield Wednesday's kits clashed, a switch was made to plain navy blue shirts. An all-red strip was adopted at the end of the 1950s, but was dropped following defeat in the 1967 League Cup Final, to be replaced by the all-white design that was worn during the club's FA Cup run of 1967–68. Since then the away strip has changed regularly, with yellow and green stripes the most common of a number of different designs used. In the 1990s and 2000s a third kit has occasionally been introduced.

Albion players – along with those of other Football League teams – first wore numbers on the back of their shirts in the abandoned season of 1939–40, and names on the back of their shirts from 1999–2000. Red numbers were added to the side of Albion players' shorts in 1969.

==== Kit sponsors ====
BSR Housewares became the club's first shirt sponsor during the 1981–82 season. The club's shirts have been sponsored for the majority of the time since then, although there was no shirt sponsor at the end of the 1993–94 season, after local solicitors Coucher & Shaw were closed down by the Law Society of England and Wales. Unusually for a Premier League club, Albion were again without a shirt sponsor for the start of the 2008–09 campaign, as negotiations with a new sponsor were still ongoing when the season began. The longest-running shirt sponsorship deal agreed by the club ran for seven seasons between 1997 and 2004 with the West Bromwich Building Society. Today the club's principal sponsor is Ideal Heating.

Since June 2024, West Brom's kit has been manufactured by Macron. Previous manufacturers have included Scoreline, Influence, Pelada, Patrick, Diadora, Umbro, Adidas and Puma.

Period	Kit manufacturer	Shirt sponsor
1974–1981	Umbro	—
1981–1982	Umbro	BSR
1982–1984	Umbro	Swan
1984–1986	Umbro	No Smoking
1986–1989	Umbro	Apollo/Apollo 2000
1989–1990	Scoreline	Apollo/Apollo 2000
1990–1991	Scoreline	Sandwell Council
1991–1992	Influence	Sandwell Council
1992–1993	Albion Collection	Sandwell Council
1993–1994	Pelada	Coucher & Shaw
1994–1995	Pelada	Guest Motors
1995–1997	Patrick	Guest Motors
1997–2002	Patrick	West Bromwich Building Society
2002–2003	The Baggies	West Bromwich Building Society
2003–2004	Diadora	West Bromwich Building Society
2004–2006	Diadora	T-Mobile
2006–2008	Umbro	T-Mobile
2008–2009	Umbro	—
2009–2010	Umbro	—
2010–2011	Umbro	HomeServe
2011–2012	Adidas	bodog
2012–2014	Adidas	Zoopla
2014–2015	Adidas	QuickBooks
2015–2016	Adidas	TLCBET
2016–2017	Adidas	K8
2017–2018	Adidas	Palm Eco-Town Development
2018–2024	Puma	Ideal Heating (Groupe Atlantic)
2024–	Macron	Ideal Heating (Groupe Atlantic)

== Stadium ==
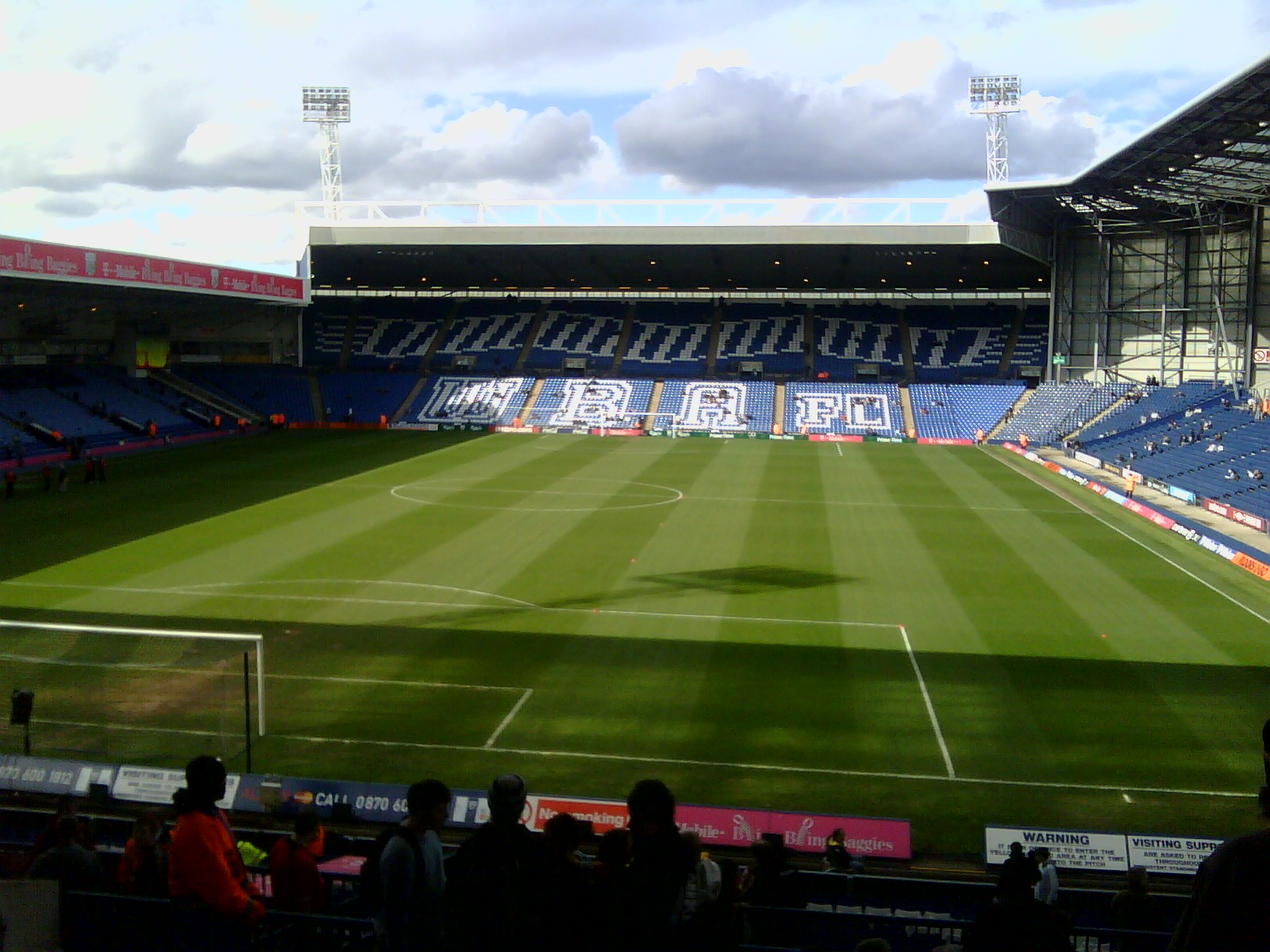
The Hawthorns, home of West Bromwich Albion F.C.

The speed with which the club became established following its foundation is illustrated by the fact that it outgrew four successive grounds in its first seven years. The first was Cooper's Hill, where they played from 1878 to 1879. From 1879 to 1881, they appear to have alternated between Cooper's Hill and Dartmouth Park. During the 1881–82 season, they played at Bunn's Field, also known as the Birches. This had a capacity of between 1,500 and 2,000, and was Albion's first enclosed ground, allowing the club to charge an entrance fee for the first time. From 1882 to 1885, as the popularity of football increased, Albion rented the Four Acres ground from the well-established West Bromwich Dartmouth Cricket Club. But they quickly outgrew this new home and soon needed to move again. From 1885 to 1900, Albion played at Stoney Lane; their tenure of this ground was arguably the most successful period in the club's history, as they won the FA Cup twice and were runners-up three times.

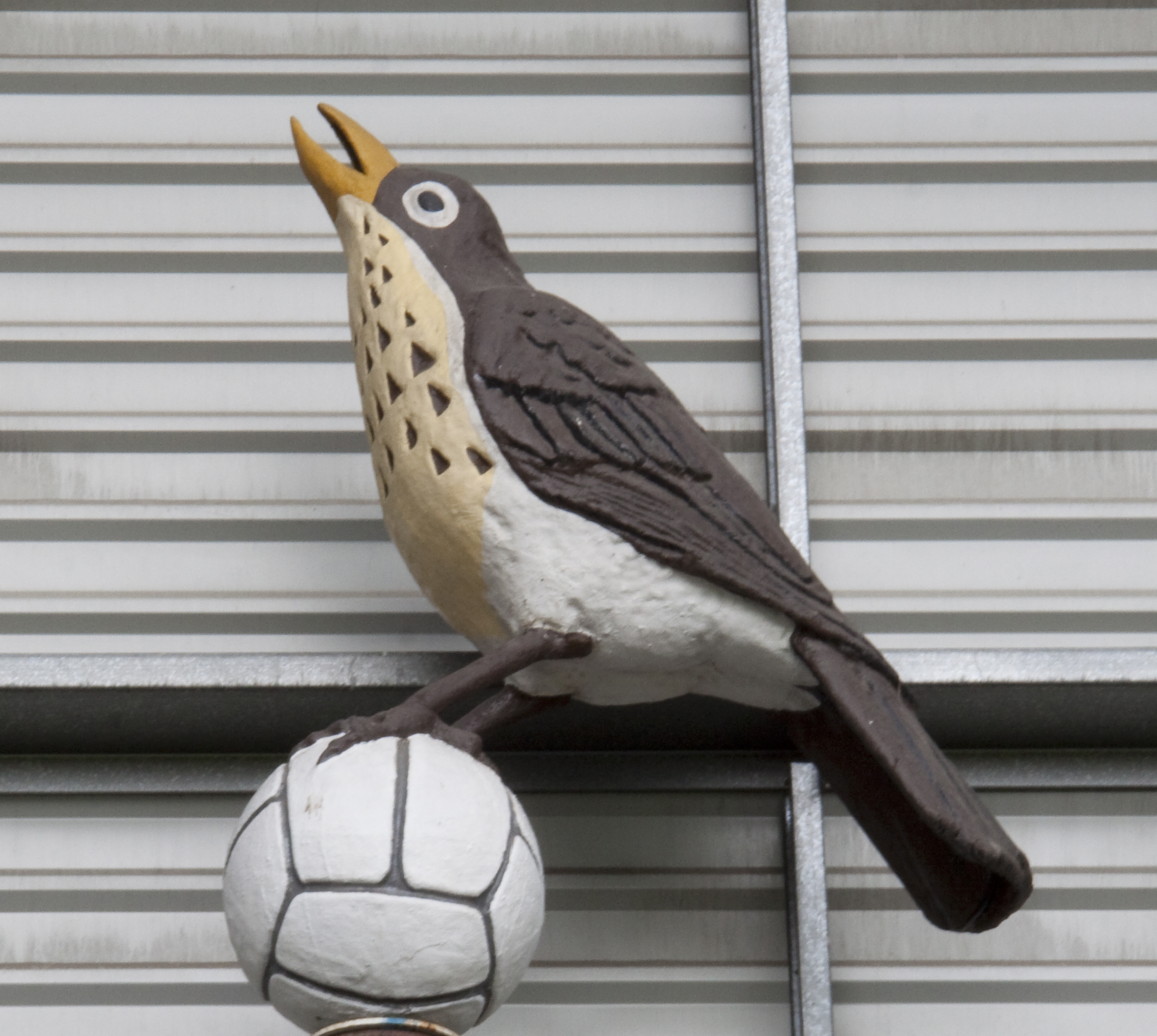
The throstle effigy has been a feature of the Woodman corner since the 1970s.

By 1900, when the lease on Stoney Lane expired, the club needed a bigger ground yet again and so made its last move to date. All of Albion's previous grounds had been close to the centre of West Bromwich, but on this occasion they took up a site on the town's border with Handsworth and Smethwick. The new ground was named The Hawthorns, after the hawthorn bushes that covered the area and were cleared to make way for it. Albion drew 1–1 with Derby County in the first match at the stadium, on 3 September 1900. The record attendance at the Hawthorns was on 6 March 1937, when 64,815 spectators saw Albion beat Arsenal 3–1 in the FA Cup quarter-final. The Hawthorns became an all-seater stadium in the 1990s, in order to comply with the recommendations of the Taylor Report. Its capacity today is 26,688, the four stands being known respectively as the Birmingham Road End, Smethwick End, East Stand and West Stand (Halfords Lane). At an altitude of 551 feet (168 m) above sea level, the Hawthorns is the highest of all the 92 Premier League and Football League grounds.

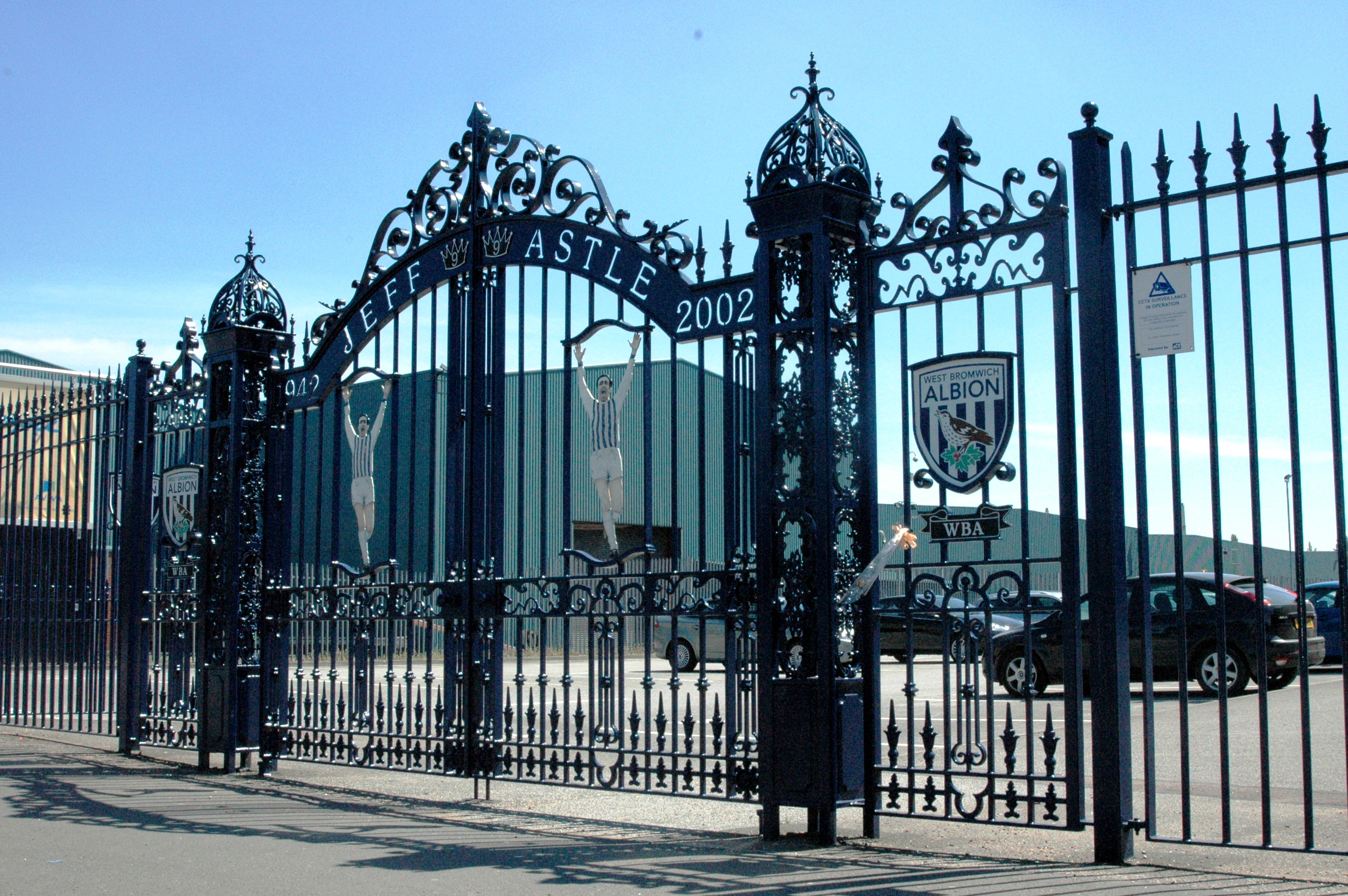
The Jeff Astle gates at The Hawthorns.

The Hawthorns is certificated under the highest UEFA pitch surfaces which means it is ready to host almost any competition if required. The stadium's West Stand has the potential to be developed over the Halfords Lane at the back of the stand to allow for an upper tier, bringing the capacity of The Hawthorns to around 30,000.

West Bromwich Albion own retail outlets around The Hawthorns, including its Stadium Megastore and seasonally a club store in West Bromwich town centre. They also own the former Hawthorns Pub, a Grade II listed building behind the West Stand on the corner of Halfords Lane and the Birmingham Road. This has served as the official club fanzone with licensed bars, live music, fan favourites – such as mascots and children activities – as well as being shared with a high street food outlet. The pub competes with The Vine pub in Roebuck Lane, a popular destination for visiting and home football fans year-round.

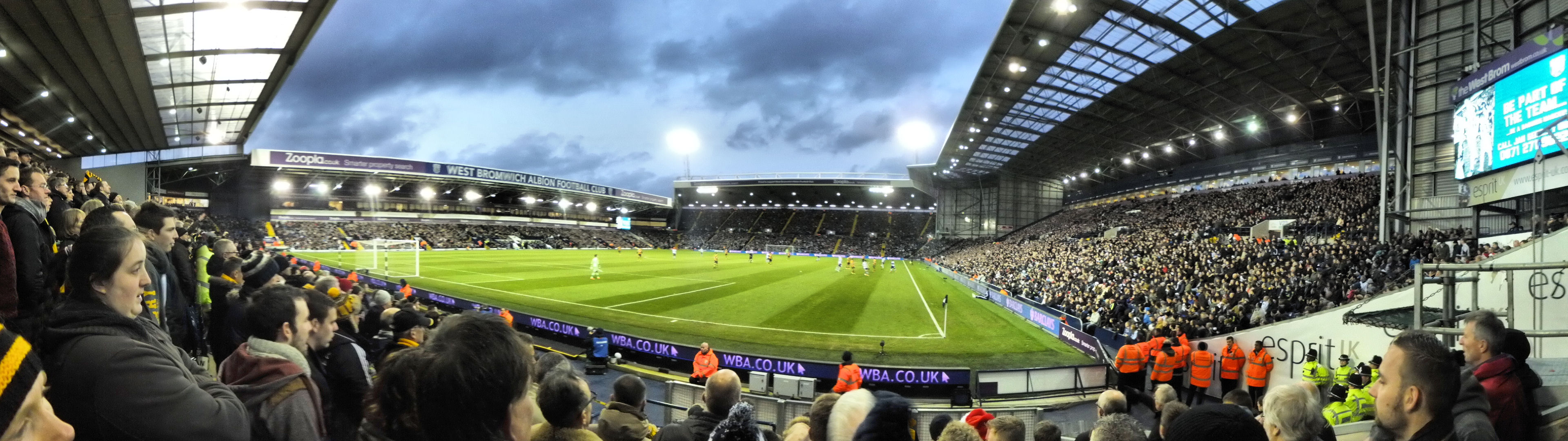
Panoramic view of The Hawthorns, home of West Bromwich Albion F.C.

== Supporters ==
The Lord's my Shepherd, I'll not want.

He makes me down to lie
In pastures green; he leadeth me

The quiet waters by.

— Lyrics to first verse of "The Lord's my Shepherd" from Psalm 23

=== Fan culture ===
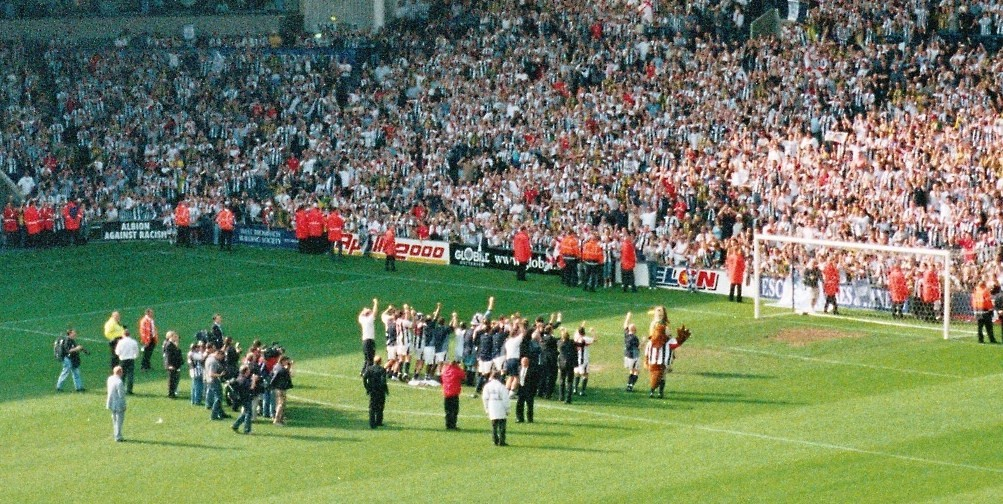
West Brom fans and players celebrate together with the "Boing Boing" chant.

The official West Bromwich Albion Supporters Club was founded on 4 October 1951. In the years since then, over 30 branches have been established throughout the United Kingdom, and internationally in Jersey, Ireland, Spain, Malta, Croatia, USA, UAE, India, Thailand and Australia. There are also supporters groups for those with disabilities, for mental health support, Punjabi supporters, supporters in the emergency services and armed forces, and LGBT people.

Albion's "club anthem" is The Lord's my Shepherd, a setting of Psalm 23. The song originated following a rare Sunday game in the 1970s and has been sung at matches ever since. Supporters of the team celebrate goals by bouncing up and down and chanting "Boing Boing". This dates back to the 1992–93 season, when the team was promoted from the new Second Division, with the origin of the chant still unclear. The Liquidator instrumental by the Harry J. Allstars has also been popularly played in the stadium and sung to since the late 1960s. The reggae song "West Bromwich Albion" by Ray King is another club anthem popularly played before matches. In recent years fans of the team have celebrated the end of each season by adopting a fancy dress theme for the final away match, including dressing as Vikings in 2004 in honour of Player of the Season Thomas Gaardsøe.

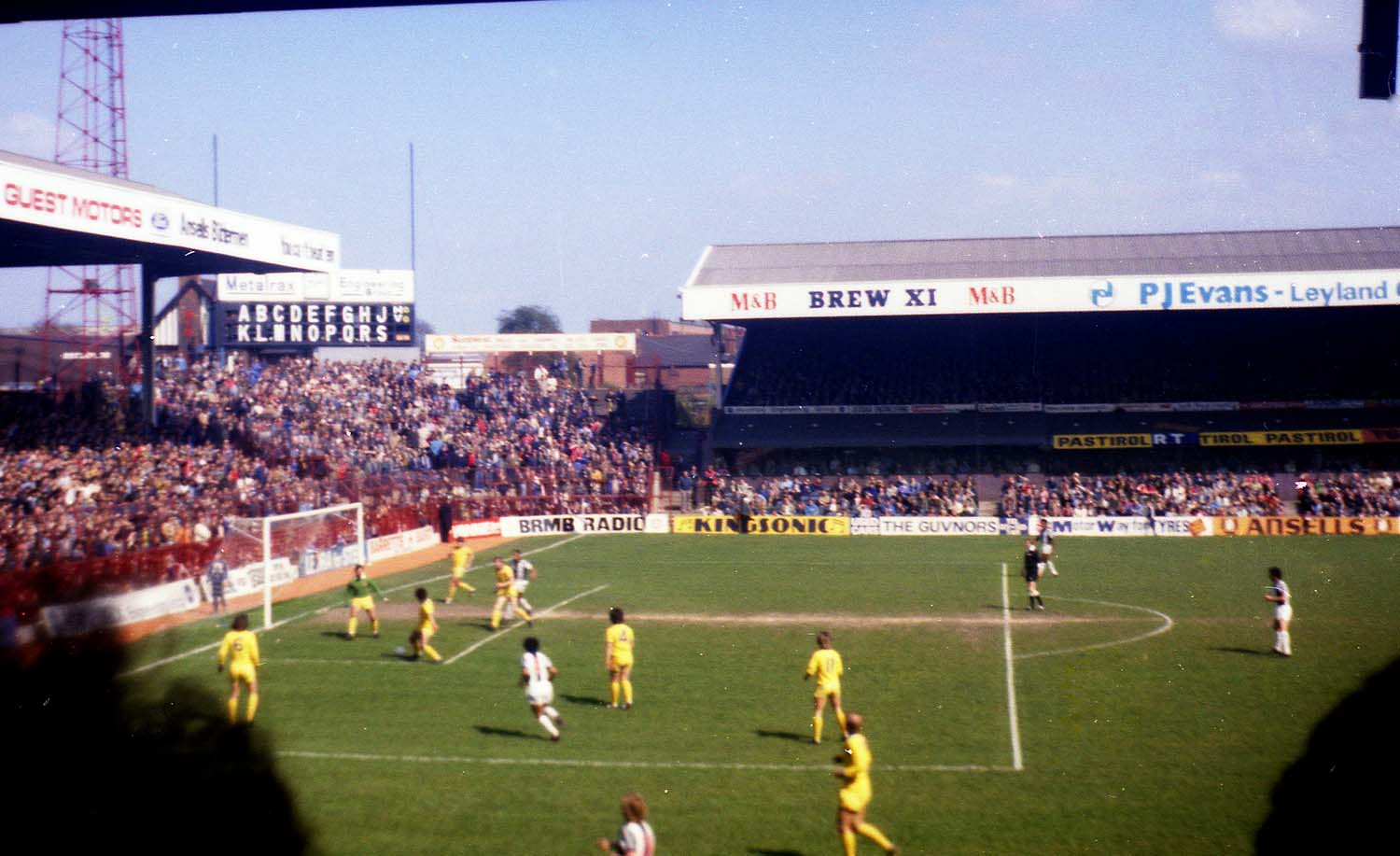
WBA supporters at a First Division match in May 1980 at The Hawthorns.

In 2002–03 Albion's fans were voted the best in the Premier League by their peers, while in the BBC's 2002 "national intelligence test" Test the Nation, they were found to be "more likely to be smarter than any other football supporters, registering an average score of 138".

Famous fans include goalkeepers Aaron Ramsdale, Hannah Hampton and Ben Foster, comedian Frank Skinner, TV presenters Adrian Chiles, Anne Aston and Cat Deeley, One Direction singer Liam Payne, comedian Lenny Henry, actress Julie Walters, The Rolling Stones guitarist Ronnie Wood, tennis players Ann Jones and Goran Ivanišević, DJ Dave Haslam, boxers Richie Woodhall and Tommy Langford, and guitarist Eric Clapton.

=== Publications ===
The club has published an official matchday programme for supporters since 1905. The publication was entitled Albion News for many years, but was renamed Albion from the 2002–03 season until the close season of 2013, when it was renamed back to Albion News. It won Premier League Programme of the Year in 2002–03 and Third Division Programme of the Year in 1991–92. In 2007–08, it was awarded Championship Programme of the Year by both Programme Monthly and the Football Programme Directory. The programme has a circulation in excess of 8,000 copies.

The first West Bromwich Albion fanzine, Fingerpost, was published from 1983 until 1992, and was followed by several others, most notably Grorty Dick (1989–2005), named for a traditional Black Country casserole dish, and Last Train to Rolfe Street (1992–1995). Since Grorty Dick ceased publication in 2005, the club now only has one fanzine dedicated to it; 'Baggie Shorts' which is produced by the West Bromwich Albion Supporters' Club London Branch.

=== "Baggies" nickname ===
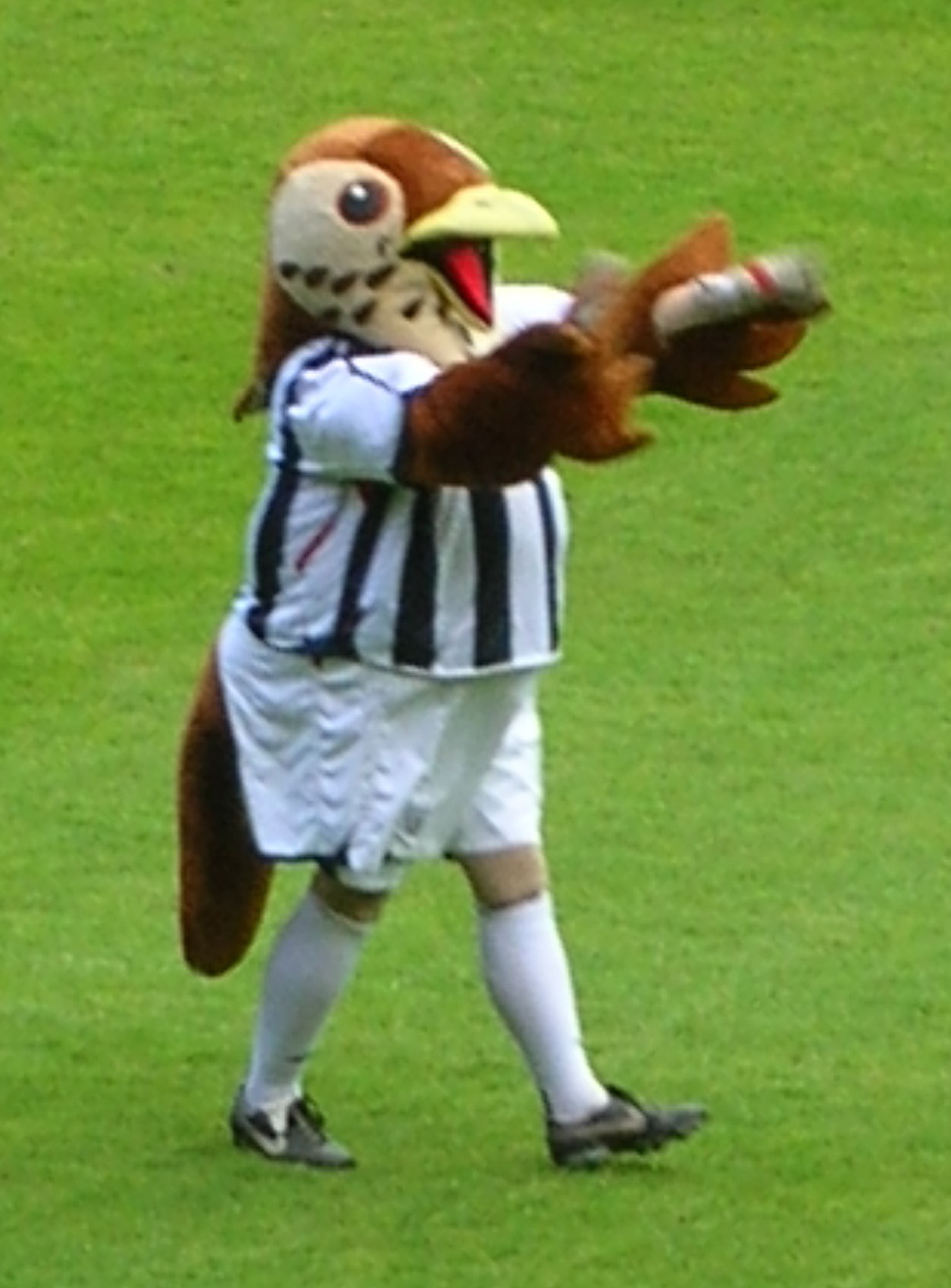
Baggie Bird is one of two West Bromwich Albion mascots.

The official club mascots are named Baggie Bird and Albi; both are based on the throstle depicted on the club crest. In their early days West Brom were nicknamed "the Throstles".

The club's more popular nickname among supporters came to be "the Baggies", a term which the club itself looked down upon for many years but later embraced. The phrase was first heard at the Hawthorns in the 1900s, but its exact origins are uncertain. Club historian Tony Matthews, suggests that it derives from the "bagmen", who carried the club's matchday takings in big leather bags from the turnstiles to the cash office on the halfway line. One suggestion was that the name was bestowed on Albion supporters by their rivals at Aston Villa, because of the large baggy trousers that many Albion fans wore at work to protect themselves from molten iron in the factories and foundries of the Black Country. Other theories relate to the baggy shorts worn by various players during the club's early years.

== Rivalries ==
Historically, Albion's greatest rivals were Aston Villa from nearby Birmingham. The two clubs contested three FA Cup Finals between 1887 and 1895 (Villa winning two and Albion one). More recently, however, most Albion fans tend to see Wolverhampton Wanderers as their main rivals, particularly as between 1989 and 2002 Albion and Villa were never in the same division, but Albion were in the same division as Wolves for 11 out of 14 seasons. This had led to Aston Villa supporters now considering Birmingham City to be their fiercest rivals. A less-heated rivalry also exists with Birmingham City, with whom Albion contested the 1931 FA Cup final, as well as a semi-final in 1968.

A number of hooligan firms associate themselves with Albion, including Section 5, Clubhouse and the Smethwick Mob.

=== Black Country derby ===
Albion and Wolves contest the Black Country derby, one of the longest standing derbies in world football. It is considered one of the fiercest rivalries in English football. A 2008 survey found it to be the most intense rivalry in the country, with one in four fans from both clubs claiming that their rivalry went much deeper than football. The two sides have played each other 160 times, with their first major clash being an FA Cup tie in 1886. Both Albion and Wolves were founding members of the Football League in 1888, making the derby the joint oldest in English league football.

The rivalry came to prominence when the two clubs contested the league title in 1953–54, and during the 1990s it intensified to new heights among supporters, with both clubs languishing in Division One for much of the decade and only local pride at stake. Moreover, in 2002 Albion came from being 11 points adrift to overhaul Wolves to gain promotion. The rivalry was further heightened after the sides met in the play-offs in 2007. A 2004 survey by Planetfootball.com confirmed that the majority of both Albion and Wolves supporters consider the other to be their main rival. In February 2012 the Baggies beat Wolves 5–1 away from home, with Peter Odemwingie scoring a hat-trick. The game became known as the 'demolition derby', and remains the highest scoring Black Country derby of the 21st century. Despite their geographical location, fellow Black Country club Walsall are seen as lesser rivals, having played in a lower division than Albion for most of their history. The Rivalry between West Bromwich Albion and Wolverhampton Wanderers was heightened during a 2024 FA Cup fourth-round tie against Wolves, seeing a 2–0 victory to Wolves. Although this was overshadowed by fan troubles during the 78th minute where play was halted for 38 minutes, whilst police attempted to control the crowds. West Bromwich Albion were fined £30,000 by the FA for the incident.

=== Rivalry with Aston Villa ===
Ranked by The Daily Telegraph in 2010 as the most fierce in the region, games between Aston Villa and West Brom are particularly ferocious. The two first met on 9 December 1882, in the second round of the Staffordshire Cup: Villa hosted a 3–3 draw in front of 13,900 fans, while in the replay West Brom won by a single goal with an attendance of 10,500. On 3 January 1885, they met for the first time in the third round of the FA Cup: a goalless draw at West Brom was followed by a 3–0 victory for them away at Villa. The following year, both teams became founder members of the Football League. They met first in a league fixture on 19 January 1889, Villa winning 2–0 at home, before a draw the next week ending 3–3. The two teams met in two further FA Cup finals in the 19th century, a 3–0 win for West Brom in 1892 and a 1–0 win for Aston Villa in 1895.

Birmingham City were relegated from the Premier League in 2011 and Wolverhampton Wanderers a season later, leaving Aston Villa and West Brom as the only West Midlands teams in England's top division. Without their respective main rivals and with Albion finishing above their nearest rivals for the second season in a row, the historic rivalry was rekindled to pre-1990s competitiveness. At the end of the 2015–16 season, Aston Villa were relegated, leaving West Brom as the only West Midlands team in the top flight for the 2016–17 season. After Albion's relegation at the end of the 2017–18 Premier League, the teams faced each other in the Championship. In the 2018–19 EFL Championship play-off semi-finals, Villa controversially knocked out Albion on penalties, after the Albion had two men sent-off over both legs.

== Ownership and governance ==
As of 26 June 2026:

=== Executive Leadership Team ===
Position	Name
Majority Shareholder and Chairman	Shilen Patel
Executive Director	Mark Miles
Chief of Staff & Communications Officer	Ian Skidmore
Chief Business Officer	Sam Jeffery
Chief Legal & Governance Officer	Richard Parnell
Senior Director of Football Finance	John Pelling
Director of Human Resources	Sam Foxall

Position	Name
Club Secretary	Sarah McGenn
Director of Operations & SHE (Safety, Health & Environment)	Chris Harris
Director of Events, Experience & Technology	Tomasz Chadwick
Head of Football Operations	Ian Pearce
Technical Director	Dominic Price
Director, The Albion Foundation	Rob Lake

=== History of Albion's ownership and governance ===
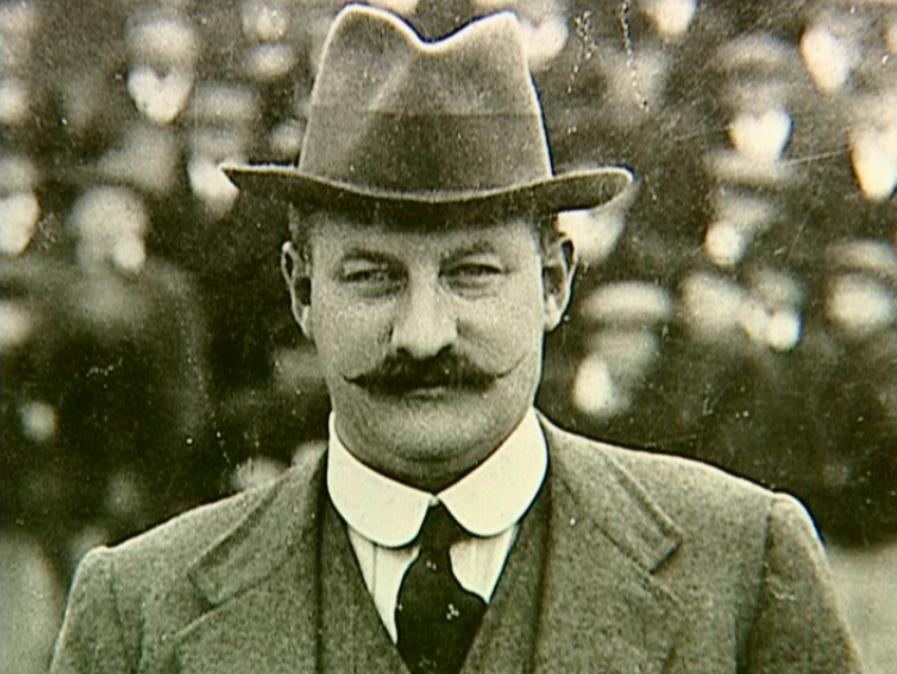
Billy Bassett, Albion's chairman 1908–1937

In the club's formative years, West Bromwich Albion were run by a seven-man playing committee, and funded by each member contributing a weekly subscription of 6d (six pence) (2 1/2p). Albion's first chairman was Henry Jackson, appointed in 1885, with the club becoming a limited company in June 1891. Other early chairmen of Albion included Jem Bayliss and Billy Bassett, both of whom had earlier played for the club. Indeed, from 1878 to 1986 there was always an Albion player or ex-player on the club's committee or board of directors. Bassett became an Albion director in 1905, following the resignation of the previous board in its entirety. The club was in deep financial trouble and had had a writ served upon them by their bank, but Bassett and returning chairman Harry Keys rescued the club, aided by local fund-raising activities. Bassett became chairman in 1908, and helped the club to avoid bankruptcy once more in 1910 by paying the players' summer wages from his own pocket. He remains Albion's longest-serving chairman, having held the position until his death in 1937. The club's longest-serving director was Major H. Wilson Keys, during the period 1930–1965, including 15 years as chairman. He became vice-president of the Football Association in 1969. Sir Bert Millichip served as Albion chairman from 1974 to 1983, after which he chose to concentrate on his role as chairman of the Football Association.

In 1996, the club became a public limited company, issuing shares to supporters at £500 and £3,000 each, under the Chairmanship of Paul Thompson. The shares were quoted on the Alternative Investment Market, but the club withdrew from the stock exchange in order to become a private company again in 2004. The name of the company thus reverted from West Bromwich Albion plc to West Bromwich Albion Limited, the latter becoming a subsidiary of West Bromwich Albion Holdings Limited. Jeremy Peace took up the post in 2002, after a rift between previous chairman Paul Thompson and manager Gary Megson forced Thompson to quit the club.

In September 2007, Peace acquired additional shares in West Bromwich Albion Holdings Limited, taking his total stake in the company to 50.56%. This triggered a requirement, under the Takeover Code, for him to make a mandatory cash offer for the remaining shares in both WBA Holdings Ltd and WBA Ltd. Later that year, Michelle Davies became Albion's first female director. She stepped down in 2010. Jeremy Peace announced in June 2008 that he was looking for a major new investor for the club, but no firm proposals were received by the 31 July deadline. On 24 July 2015, Jeremy Peace announced that his sale exclusivity deal was called off after a potential buyer was unable to fulfil the terms of sale.

In July 2016, Peace announced that he had found a buyer in the form of a Chinese investment group headed by Lai Guochuan. The figure agreed upon is believed to have been in the region of £175 million – £200 million. The takeover was successfully completed on 15 September the same year. John Williams was originally appointed chairman of the club before Lai replaced him with associate Li Piyue after the club's relegation in the 2017–18 season. Lai himself took over as chairman on 2 February 2022. The 2022–23 season saw increased scrutiny of the club's ownership, and the practices of majority shareholder Guochuan Lai. The club's financial situation began to receive national media attention, having already been commented on frequently in local press. Supporter action groups and in-stadium protests by fans to raise awareness of the club's off-field issues took shape during the season, but were briefly paused in April 2023 as the club's fans supported the side's promotion push.

On 15 February 2024, it was announced that Florida-based entrepreneur Shilen Patel and his father, philanthropist Kiran C Patel had reached an agreement to acquire an 87.8% stake in the club, under the name Bilkul Football WBA. Shilen Patel would also be named as the chairman of the club.

== Players ==
=== Current squad ===
As of 20 October 2026

Note: Flags indicate national team as defined under FIFA eligibility rules; some limited exceptions apply. Players may hold more than one non-FIFA nationality.

No.	Pos.	Nation	Player
1	GK	IRL	Max O'Leary
2	DF	WAL	Chris Mepham
3	DF	ENG	Nat Phillips
4	DF	HUN	Callum Styles
6	DF	USA	George Campbell (captain)
7	MF	NOR	Felix Horn Myhre
8	MF	IRL	Jayson Molumby
9	FW	SCO	Barney Stewart
10	FW	IRL	Mikey Johnston
11	FW	ENG	Jimmy-Jay Morgan
13	GK	ENG	Matt Ingram

No.	Pos.	Nation	Player
15	MF	ENG	Toby Collyer
17	MF	MLI	Ousmane Diakité
18	DF	FRA	Brayann Pereira
19	FW	NOR	Aune Heggebø
20	MF	FRA	Rabby Nzingoula
21	MF	NIR	Isaac Price
22	DF	ENG	Conor Townsend
23	FW	JOR	Tammer Bany
25	DF	FRA	Nolan Galves
26	FW	ESP	Kareem Tunde
29	MF	ENG	Harry Whitwell

=== Out on loan ===
Note: Flags indicate national team as defined under FIFA eligibility rules; some limited exceptions apply. Players may hold more than one non-FIFA nationality.

No.	Pos.	Nation	Player
14	DF	ENG	Alfie Gilchrist (on loan at Leyton Orient until end of season)
28	DF	WAL	Alex Williams (on loan at Hibernian until end of season)
37	FW	WAL	Ollie Bostock (on loan at Boston United until end of season)

== Coaching staff ==
As of 29 June 2026

=== First team ===
Position		Name
Head Coach	(Scotland)	James Morrison
Assistant Head Coach	(England)	Matt Gill
First Team Coach	(Scotland)	Gavin Strachan
First Team Coach	(England)	Tony McMahon
Goalkeeping Coach	(Wales)	Boaz Myhill
Head Physiotherapist	(England)	Richard Rawlins
Physiotherapist	(England)	Adam Bending
Head of Performance Analysis	(England)	David Stewart
Opposition Analyst	(England)	Jack Murray
Sports Scientist	(Australia)	Kirsty Frick
Kit Manager	(Republic of Ireland)	Jacko Smith
Kit Man	(England)	Daniel Hill

=== Academy ===
Position		Name
Head of Academy Coaching	(England)	Mick Halsall
Loans Manager	(Northern Ireland)	Chris Brunt
U-23s Manager	(England)	Leigh Downing
U-23s Coach	(Jamaica)	Deon Burton
U-18s Coach	(England)	Chay Thompson
Head of Academy Recruitment	(England)	Tom Brady

== Notable former players ==
As part of the club's 125th anniversary celebrations in 2004, a survey was commissioned via the official West Bromwich Albion website and the Express & Star newspaper to determine the greatest West Brom players of all time. A modern-day, 16-man squad was compiled from the results; all selected players are depicted on a commemorative mural displayed at The Hawthorns. Fourteen of the sixteen players are English-born, with a fifteenth, Cyrille Regis, a French Guiana-born full England international. The list of 16 is as follows:

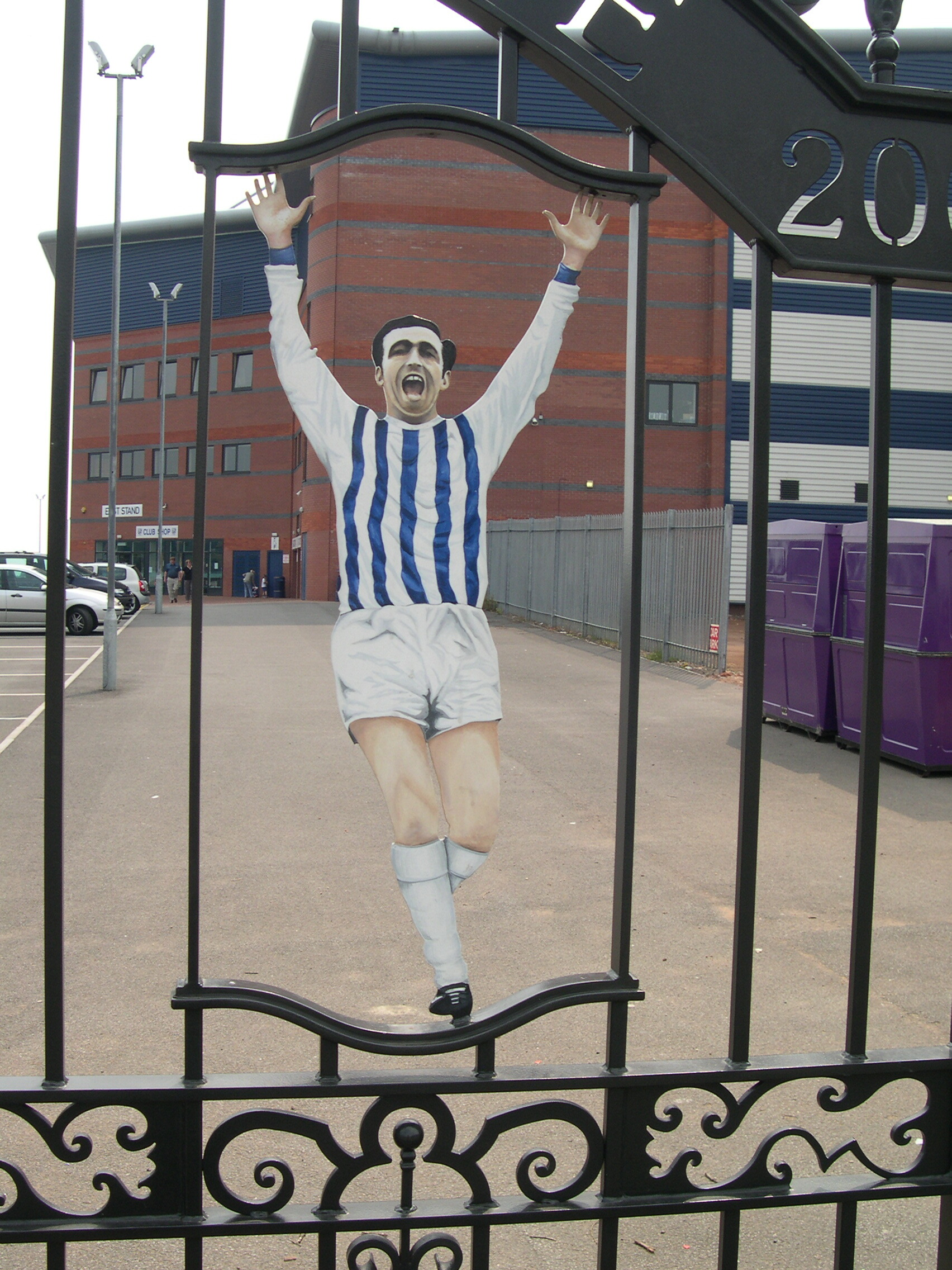
The Jeff Astle gates at The Hawthorns

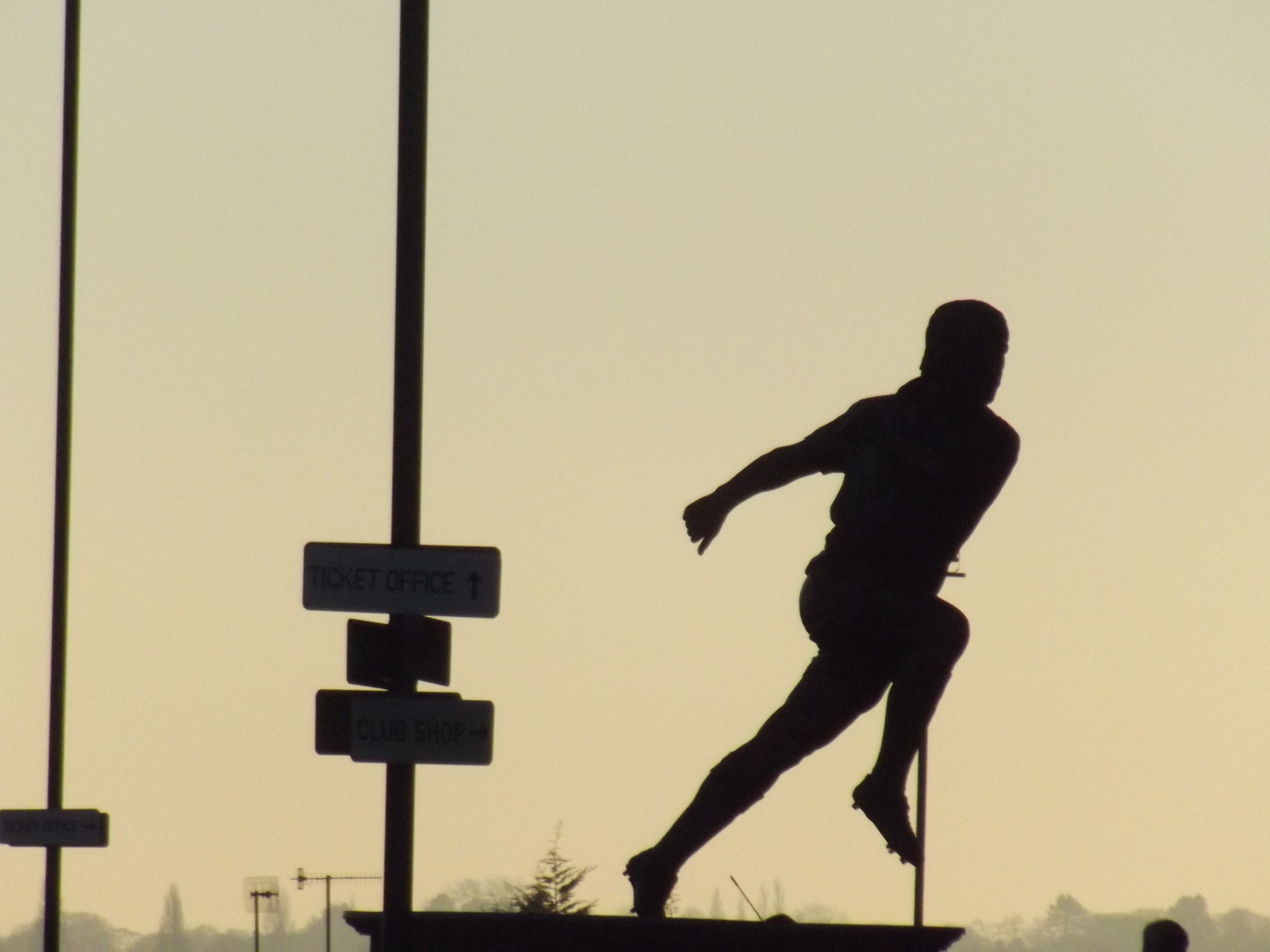
Sillouette of the Tony Brown statue outside The Hawthorns

Name	Nat.	Years	Apps	Goals	Position
Billy Bassett	(England)	1886–99	311	77	Outside right
Jesse Pennington	(England)	1903–22	496	0	Left back
W. G. Richardson	(England)	1929–45	354	228	Centre forward
Ray Barlow	(England)	1944–60	482	48	Left-half
Ronnie Allen	(England)	1950–61	458	234	Centre forward
Don Howe	(England)	1952–64	379	19	Right back
Derek Kevan	(England)	1953–63	262	157	Centre forward
Tony Brown	(England)	1963–81	720	279	Wing half/Inside forward
Jeff Astle	(England)	1964–74	361	174	Centre forward
John Osborne	(England)	1967–72; 1973–78	312	0	Goalkeeper
John Wile	(England)	1970–83	619	29	Centre-half
Willie Johnston	(Scotland)	1972–79	261	28	Outside left
Bryan Robson	(England)	1974–81	249	46	Central midfielder
Derek Statham	(England)	1976–87	373	11	Left back
Laurie Cunningham	(England)	1977–79	114	30	Winger
Cyrille Regis	(England)	1977–84	302	112	Centre forward

Other notable honours bestowed upon West Brom players include the PFA Young Player of the Year award, which was presented to Cyrille Regis in 1979. In 1998, Billy Bassett and Bryan Robson were named among the list of Football League 100 Legends, along with Arthur Rowley, Geoff Hurst and Johnny Giles. Bryan Robson was also an inaugural inductee into the English Football Hall of Fame in 2002, to be joined two years later by Geoff Hurst. Bobby Robson, a player with Albion, has also been inducted, although this was for his achievements as a manager. In 1919–20, Fred Morris became the first Albion player to finish as top goalscorer in Division One, a feat which has since been repeated by Ronnie Allen, Derek Kevan, Jeff Astle and Tony Brown.^{[D]} Brown, who holds the club records for goals and appearances, was voted into the PFA Centenary Hall of Fame in July 2007.

=== Player of the Year ===
Year	Winner
1979	(England) Bryan Robson
1980	N/A
1981	(England) Tony Godden
1982	(England) Cyrille Regis
1983	N/A
1984	(England) Paul Barron
1985	(England) Garry Thompson
1986	(England) Stephen Hunt
1987	(England) Stuart Naylor
1988	(England) Carlton Palmer
1989	(England) Chris Whyte
1990	(Northern Ireland) Bernard McNally
1991	(England) Graham Roberts

Year	Winner
1992	(England) Daryl Burgess
1993	(England) Bob Taylor
1994	(England) Daryl Burgess
1995	(Wales) Paul Mardon
1996	(England) Andy Hunt
1997	(England) Ian Hamilton
1998	(England) Alan Miller
1999	(England) Lee Hughes
2000	(Iceland) Lárus Sigurðsson
2001	(England) Neil Clement
2002	(England) Russell Hoult
2003	(Wales) Jason Koumas
2004	(Denmark) Thomas Gaardsøe

Year	Winner
2005	(England) Ronnie Wallwork
2006	(England) Jonathan Greening
2007	(Senegal) Diomansy Kamara
2008	(England) Kevin Phillips
2009	(Northern Ireland) Chris Brunt
2010	(Scotland) Graham Dorrans
2011	(Democratic Republic of the Congo) Youssouf Mulumbu
2012	(England) Ben Foster
2013	(Northern Ireland) Gareth McAuley
2014	(England) Ben Foster
2015	(Scotland) James Morrison
2016	(Scotland) Darren Fletcher
2017	(England) Ben Foster

Year	Winner
2018	(England) Ben Foster
2019	(England) Dwight Gayle
2020	(Brazil) Matheus Pereira
2021	(England) Sam Johnstone
2022	(England) Matthew Clarke
2023	(Republic of Ireland) Jayson Molumby
2024	(Ivory Coast) Cédric Kipré
2025	(Norway) Torbjørn Heggem
2026	(Hungary) Callum Styles

== Partial list of managers ==
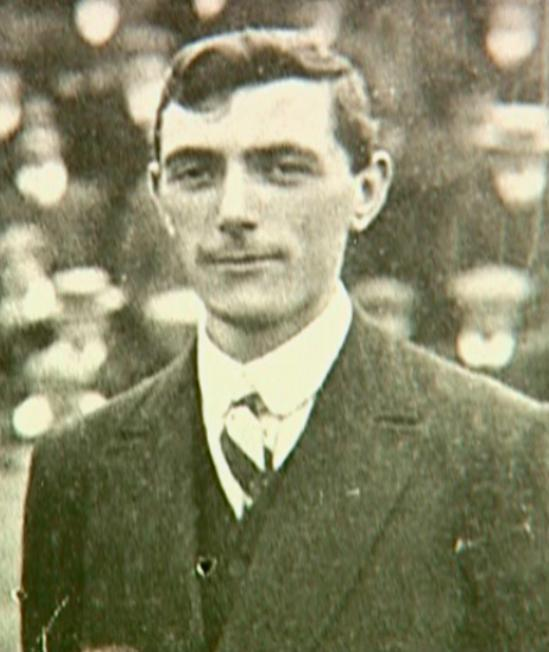
Fred Everiss, secretary-manager 1902–1948. The longest serving manager in English football history.

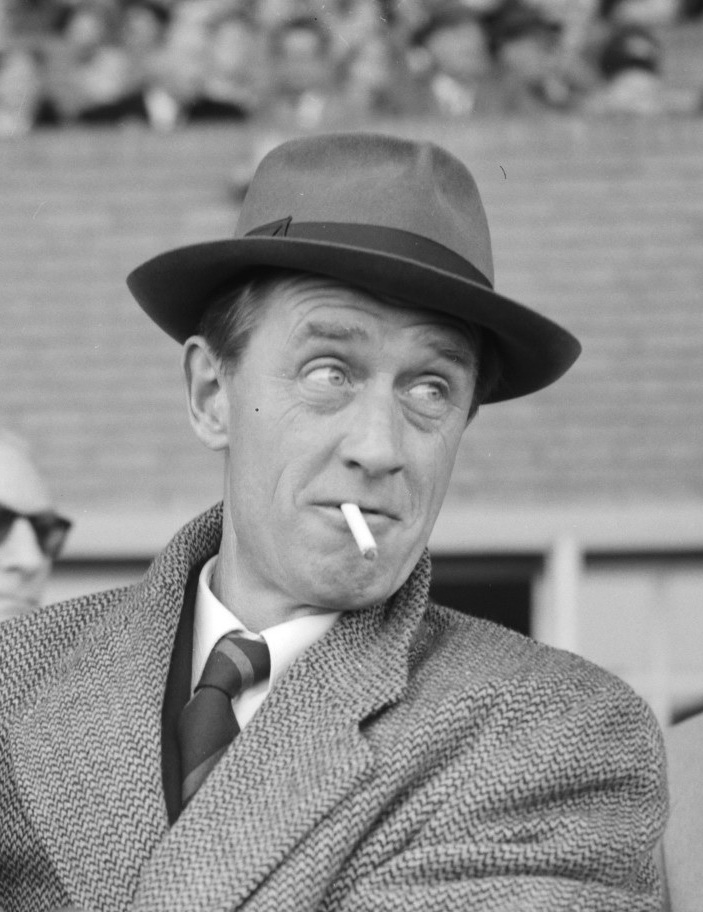
Vic Buckingham, manager 1953–1959. Narrowly missed out on a double in the 1953-54 season, winning the FA Cup and finishing as league runners-up. His tactical philosophy was a precursor to Total Football.

The following managers have all led West Bromwich Albion to at least one of the following achievements while in charge of the club: winning a major trophy or reaching the final, achieving a top three league finish in the top flight, winning promotion or reaching the quarter-finals of a major European competition.

Name	Nat.	Years	P	W	D	L	Achievements
Louis Ford^{[E]}	(England)	1890–92	58	18	10	30	FA Cup winners 1892
Edward Stephenson^{[E]}	(England)	1894–95	36	14	5	17	FA Cup runners-up 1895
Frank Heaven^{[E]}	(England)	1896–02	214	86	45	83	Division Two champions 1901–02
Fred Everiss^{[E]}	(England)	1902–48	1520	656	331	533	Promotion as Division Two winners 1910–11, FA Cup runners-up 1912, 1935, Division One winners 1919–20, Division One runners-up 1924–25, Promotion as Division Two runners-up 1930–31, FA Cup winners 1931
Jack Smith	(Wales)	1948–52	179	70	46	63	Promotion as Division Two runners-up 1948–49
Vic Buckingham	(England)	1953–59	301	130	78	93	Division One runners-up 1953–54, FA Cup winners 1954
Jimmy Hagan	(England)	1963–67	201	78	49	74	League Cup winners 1966, League Cup runners-up 1967
Alan Ashman	(England)	1967–71	182	64	49	69	FA Cup winners 1968, European Cup Winners Cup quarter-finalists 1968–69, League Cup runners-up 1970
Johnny Giles	(Republic of Ireland)	1975–77, 1984–85	159	60	42	57	Promotion from Division Two 1975–76
Ron Atkinson	(England)	1978–81, 1987–88	212	85	68	59	Division One 3rd place 1978–79, UEFA Cup quarter-finalists 1978–79
Osvaldo Ardiles	(Argentina)	1992–93	55	30	11	14	Promotion as Division Two play-off winners 1992–93
Gary Megson	(England)	2000–04	221	94	50	77	Promotion as Division One runners-up 2001–02, 2003–04
Tony Mowbray	(England)	2006–09	140	57	32	51	Promotion as Championship winners 2007–08
Roberto Di Matteo	(Italy)	2009–11	82	40	19	23	Promotion as Championship runners-up 2009–10
Slaven Bilić	(Croatia)	2019–20	65	26	22	17	Promotion as Championship runners-up 2019–20

== Records ==
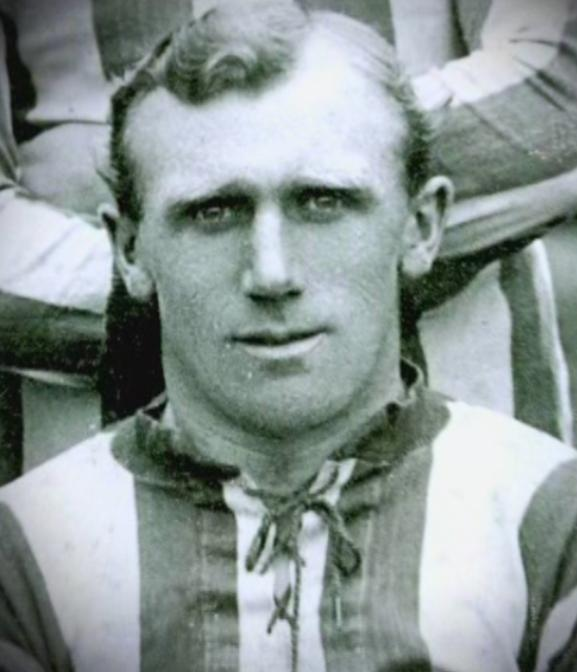
Jesse Pennington, Albion's most capped England international (in terms of caps won whilst at the club). He represented his country 25 times, serving as captain on two occasions.

West Bromwich Albion's record victory was their 12–0 league win against Darwen on 4 April 1892. This is still the widest margin of victory for a game in the top-flight of English football, although the record was equalled by Nottingham Forest when they beat Leicester Fosse by the same scoreline in 1909. Albion's biggest FA Cup victory came when they beat Chatham 10–1 on 2 March 1889. The club's record league defeat was a 3–10 loss against Stoke City on 4 February 1937, while a 0–5 defeat to Leeds United on 18 February 1967 represents Albion's heaviest FA Cup loss.

Tony Brown holds a number of Albion's club records. He has made the most appearances overall for the club (720), as well as most appearances in the league (574), FA Cup (54) and in European competition (17). Brown is the club's top scorer in the league (218), the FA Cup (27) and in Europe (8). He is also the club's record scorer overall, with 279 goals. W. G. Richardson scored 328 goals for the club, but this includes 100 during World War II, which are not normally counted towards competitive totals. Richardson holds the club record for most league goals in a single season, scoring 39 times in 1935–36.

Albion's most capped international player, taking into account only those caps won whilst at the club, is Chris Brunt. He appeared 55 times for Northern Ireland as an Albion player, earning 65 caps in total before retiring from international football in 2017. Jesse Pennington is the club's most capped England international, with 25 caps. The highest transfer fee paid by the club is £15 million to RB Leipzig for Oliver Burke on 25 August 2017. The record transfer fee received by Albion from another club was for the transfer of Salomón Rondón to Dalian Yifang in July 2019 for £16.5 million.

== Honours ==
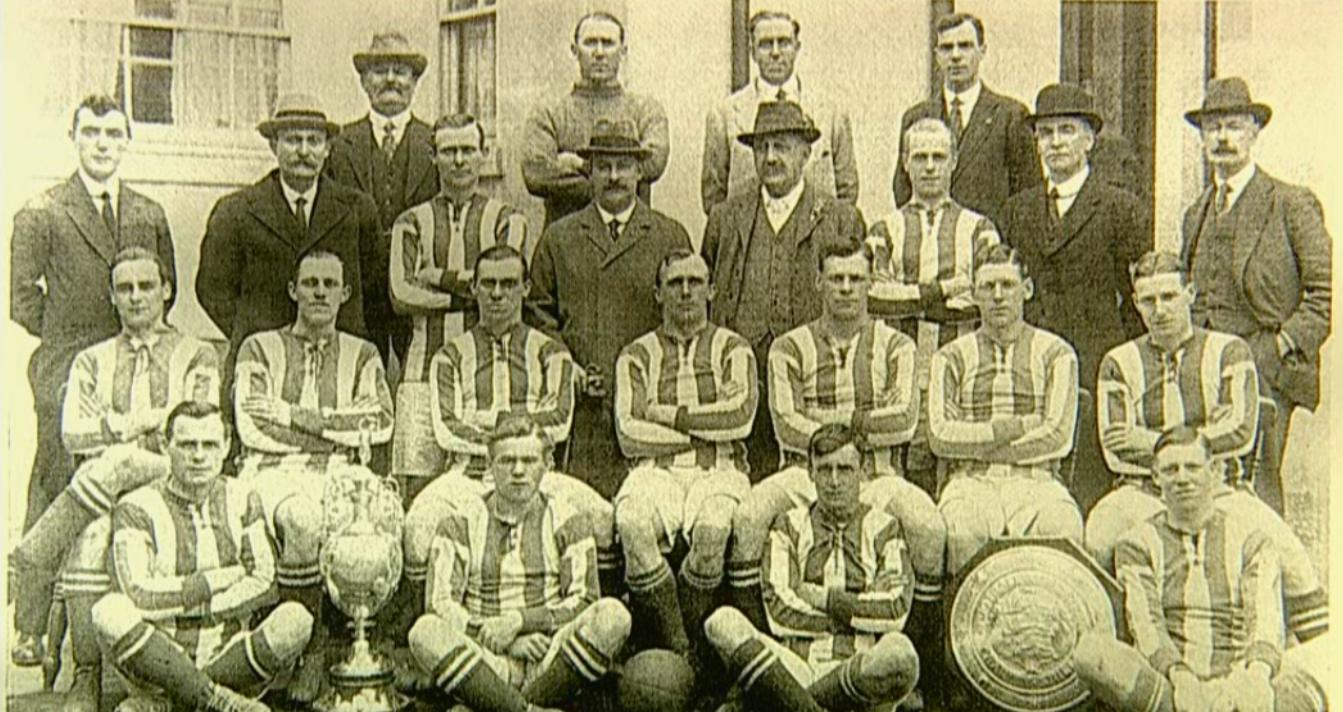
The Albion team of 1920 display the League Championship trophy and Charity Shield.

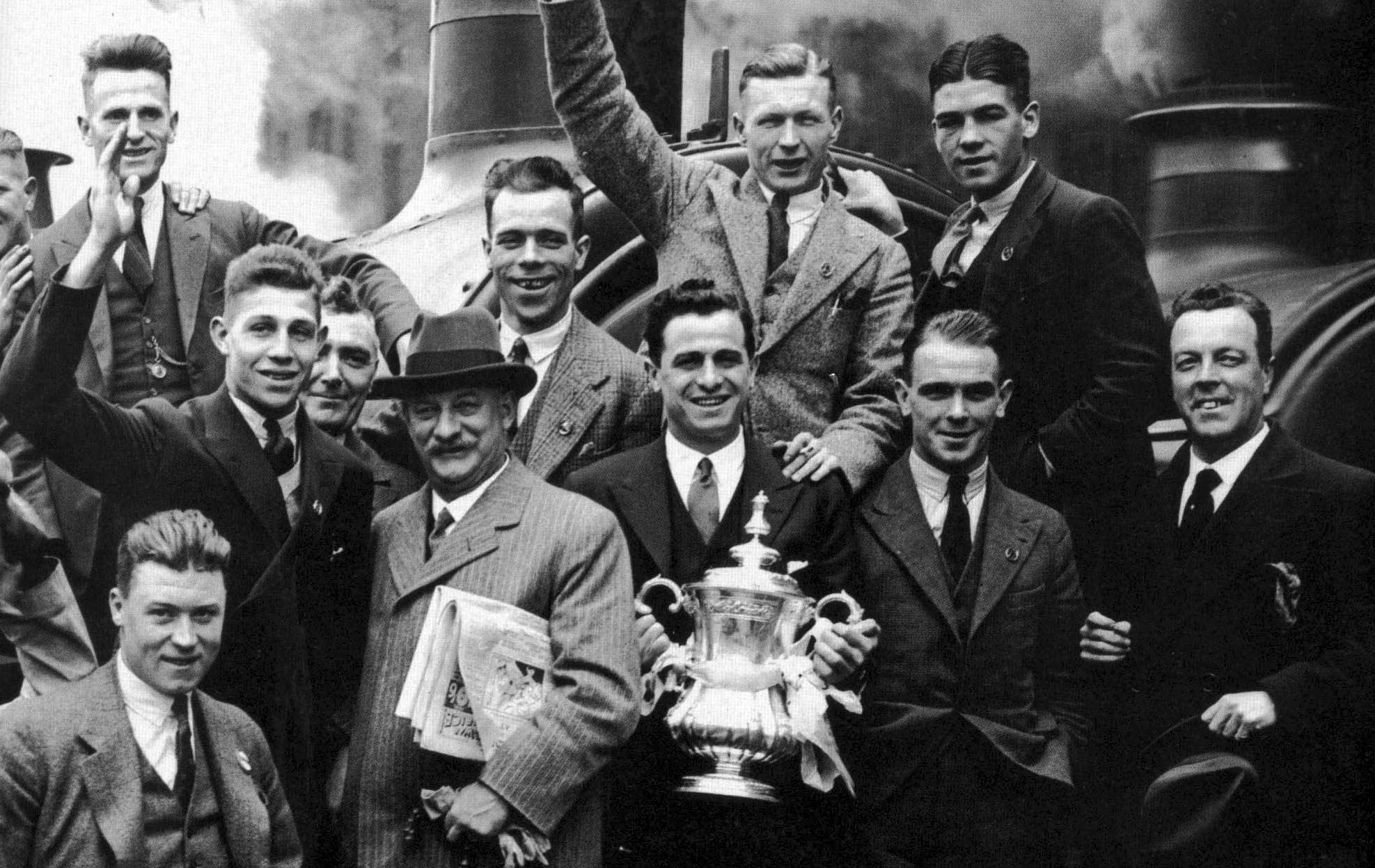
WBA players celebrate their FA Cup win in 1931.

League

- First Division (level 1)
  - Champions: 1919–20
  - Runners-up: 1924–25, 1953–54
- Second Division / First Division / Championship (level 2)
  - Champions: 1901–02, 1910–11, 2007–08
  - Runners-up: 1930–31, 1948–49, 2001–02, 2003–04, 2009–10, 2019–20
- Second Division (level 3)
  - Play-off winners: 1993

Cup

- FA Cup
  - Winners: 1887–88, 1891–92, 1930–31, 1953–54, 1967–68
  - Runners-up: 1885–86, 1886–87, 1894–95, 1911–12, 1934–35
- Football League Cup
  - Winners: 1965–66
  - Runners-up: 1966–67, 1969–70
- FA Charity Shield
  - Winners: 1920, 1954 (shared)
  - Runners-up: 1931, 1968
- Tennent Caledonian Cup
  - Winners: 1977

== Footnotes ==
A.: Older sources quote the year of formation as 1879, as evidence of a Strollers match from 1878 came to light only as recently as 1993.
B.: Throstle is a colloquial Black Country name for the song thrush.
C.: The town crest remained on the away strip until 2001.
D.: Kevan was joint-top scorer with Ray Crawford of Ipswich Town.
E.: Secretary-manager. Albion did not appoint a full-time manager until 1949.
F.: The Football League First Division was the top division of English football until 1992, when the Premier League became the top division. At the same time, the second, third and fourth tiers of English football became known as the Football League First Division, Second Division and Third Division respectively. These three divisions were renamed again in 2004 as part of a Football League re-branding exercise, becoming known as the Football League Championship, League One and League Two respectively.
G.: This feat was repeated by Sunderland in the 2013–14 season and Leicester the following year.
