= Jack Smith (footballer, born 1911) =

Welsh footballer and manager

Personal information
- Full name: Arthur John Smith
- Date of birth: 27 October 1911
- Place of birth: Merthyr Tydfil, Wales
- Date of death: 7 June 1975 (aged 63)
- Height: 5 ft 9 in (1.75 m)
- Position: Full-back

Senior career*
Years	Team	Apps	(Gls)
- Wolverhampton Wanderers
–1935	Bristol Rovers		
1935–1938	Swindon Town	114	(0)
1938–1945	Chelsea	45	(0)

Managerial career
- 1948–1952: West Bromwich Albion
- 1952–1955: Reading
- 1957–1958: Hyde United
- * Club domestic league appearances and goals

Arthur John Smith (27 October 1911 – 7 June 1975) was a Welsh footballer and football manager. He played as a full-back for Wolverhampton Wanderers, Bristol Rovers, Swindon Town and Chelsea.

During the Second World War, Smith was stationed in the Midlands and guested for West Bromwich Albion. His career was cut short when a bus ran over his foot during a blackout in Wolverhampton.

In 1948, he became West Bromwich Albion's first full-time manager and went on to manage Reading and Hyde United.
