= 1877–78 Birmingham Senior Cup =

County cup

Tournament details
- Country: England
- Venue: Wellington Road, Perry Barr

Final positions
- Champions: Shrewsbury
- Runners-up: Wednesbury Strollers

The 1877–78 Birmingham Senior Cup was the second season of the Birmingham Senior Cup, the oldest county cup competition still active and the third oldest in the world overall. Shrewsbury beat the two Wednesbury clubs to win; Wednesbury Old Athletic (W.O.A.C.) in the semi-final and Wednesbury Strollers F.C. in the final, both by 2–1. The final was played at Aston Villa's Wellington Road ground in front of 5,000 spectators. Shrewsbury came from 1–0 down at half-time, the equalizer being scored from a Wace corner "cannoning off" Shrewsbury half-back A. T. Ward, and forward J. E. Sprott scoring the winner after Shrewsbury had struck the bar – an early use of the crossbar. The Strollers protested (unsuccessfully) that Wace was not a genuine resident of Shrewsbury.

Wednesbury Strollers defeated Leamington Rovers, Aston Harold and Stafford Road to reach the fourth round. The club changed its name from Wednesbury Town between the quarter-final and the semi-final in the latter year from Town to Strollers. A measure of the difference between the Strollers and the W.O.A.C. is the latter's semi-final at home to Shrewsbury was watched by 6,000, while the Strollers only attracted 200.

Saltley College F.C. received a forfeit from Harbourne in the first round. The club captain William Thompson, introduced a passing game to the side in place of the dribbling game hitherto played, and they defeated Aston Villa in the second and received a bye in the third. They reached the semi-finals of the competition in its first three seasons, beating Aston Villa in 1877–78 en route to losing to Wednesbury Strollers in front of a crowd of 2,000 at Villa's Wellington Road ground.

Aston Villa, who, at the time, were still an amateur club beat St George's 2–0 in the first round.
