= Aston Villa F.C.–West Bromwich Albion F.C. rivalry =

Aston Villa v West Bromwich Albion
- Other names: West Midlands derby
- Location: West Midlands
- Teams: Aston Villa; West Bromwich Albion
- First meeting: 9 December 1882; Staffordshire Senior Cup; Aston Villa 3–3 West Brom
- Latest meeting: 25 April 2021; Premier League; Aston Villa 2–2 West Brom
- Stadiums: Villa Park (Aston Villa); The Hawthorns (West Brom)

Statistics
- Total meetings: 173
- Most wins: Aston Villa (79)
- Largest victory: Aston Villa 7-0 West Brom (19 October 1935)

Aston Villa and West Bromwich Albion are two English football clubs from the West Midlands who share a local rivalry. The matches between them are known as West Midlands derbies, though this term may also be used for a number of other rivalries within the region.

Their stadiums, Villa Park and The Hawthorns respectively, are four miles away from each other. Both clubs have bigger rivals—Birmingham City for the former in the Second City derby, and Wolverhampton Wanderers for the latter in the Black Country derby. A 2010 article in The Daily Telegraph ranked the rivalry between Aston Villa and West Bromwich Albion as the third most fierce in the region, behind the two aforementioned derbies.

== History ==
=== Early history ===
Aston Villa were founded in 1874, and West Bromwich Albion four years later. The two first met on 9 December 1882, in the second round of the Staffordshire Senior Cup. Villa hosted a 3–3 draw in front of 13,900 fans, while in the replay West Bromwich Albion won by a single goal with an attendance of 10,500. It is possible that this is the first recorded incident of football violence with Albion fans being pelted with soil from home supporters before scuffles broke out between the two sets of fans. On 3 January 1885 they met for the first time in the third round of the FA Cup: a goalless draw at West Bromwich Albion was followed by a 3–0 victory for them away at Aston Villa.

The first FA Cup final between the two was in 1887, which Villa won 2–0 at Kennington Oval with goals from Archie Hunter and Dennis Hodgetts for their first FA Cup. The following year, both teams became founder members of The Football League. They met first in a league fixture on 19 January 1889, Villa winning 2–0 at home, and again the next week in a 3–3 draw. The two teams met in two further FA Cup finals in the 19th century, a 3–0 win for West Bromwich Albion in 1892 and a 1–0 win for Aston Villa in 1895.

=== 1970s and 1980s ===
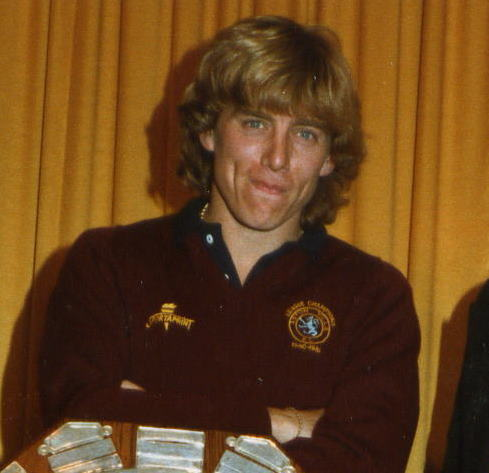
Tony Morley played for Aston Villa and West Bromwich Albion during the 1970s and 1980s. As a Villa player, he considered matches against Albion to be vital, due to the strength of the opposition.

The rivalry between the two clubs reached an intensity in the late 1970s and early 1980s: after Albion returned to the top flight under the management of Johnny Giles in 1976, both clubs regularly challenged for the league title, culminating in Villa winning the league in 1980–81. In the 10 league meetings between Albion's promotion and Villa winning the league, Albion only won once, and Villa won five times.

West Bromwich Albion's Ally Robertson said that the rivalry with Villa was more important than that with Wolverhampton Wanderers at this time, as Wolves were a comparatively weak team. Winger Tony Morley, who represented Villa and Albion in this period, said in 2013 “The biggest game for Villa fans will probably always be against Blues [Birmingham City] but for us players West Brom was always the massive game...When I was at Villa both Blues and West Brom were huge games, but for the players it was probably more vital to beat West Brom because they were such a good side". Cyrille Regis, who also represented the two during that era, contrasted the scale of the rivalry with that of the Black Country derby: “They are both big games for different reasons. Albion and Wolves are the only two teams in the Black Country so that really is a local derby with local bragging rights at stake. But, in our day, Albion versus Villa was always about being the best team in the Midlands.”

=== Modern ===
Birmingham City were relegated from the Premier League in 2011 and Wolverhampton Wanderers a season later, leaving Aston Villa and West Bromwich Albion as the only West Midlands teams in England's top division and without their respective main rivals. On 7 March 2015, Aston Villa defeated West Bromwich Albion 2–0 in an FA Cup quarter-final at Villa Park, prompting a pitch invasion by home fans which was criticised by representatives of both clubs.

Aston Villa were relegated in 2016, and West Bromwich Albion two years later. Both qualified for the EFL Championship play-offs in 2019, with Villa winning the semi-final on penalties after a 2–2 aggregate draw.

== Crossing the divide ==
Tony Morley represented Aston Villa and West Bromwich Albion in the 1970s and 1980s, winning the league and the European Cup with the former. Cyrille Regis played for both clubs in the same era, in addition to a third team in the region, Wolverhampton Wanderers. More recent players to have represented both teams include Riccardo Scimeca, James Chester, Sam Johnstone and Kevin Phillips, who left Villa for Albion in 2006 and later played for Birmingham City, and Liam Ridgewell, who also played for all three teams.

In the 2020s, Aston Villa made signings of a number of West Bromwich Albion Academy players. Signing Tim Iroegbunam, Rico Richards, Finn Azaz, Finley Thorndike and Jamaldeen Jimoh-Aloba in a period of two years after the acquisition of former West Brom Academy manager Mark Harrison as Aston Villa Academy manager.. Only Iroegbunam has gone on to forge a top level career, playing 48 times for Everton before signing for Hull city in 2026. In that period, Villa also signed former West Brom academy players Louie Barry and Morgan Rogers although not directly from West Brom.

== Head-to-head ==
=== Statistics ===
Corrected as of April 2021

Competition	Played	Aston Villa wins	Draws	West Bromwich wins	Aston Villa goals	West Bromwich goals	H2H
League	150	67	35	48	238	203	+19
FA Cup	16	10	3	3	24	14	+7
League Cup	7	2	1	4	9	16	+2
Total	173	79	39	55	271	233	+24

== Honours ==
As of 20 May 2026
