= Baugh =

Baugh is a surname. Notable people with the surname include:

- Albert C. Baugh (1891–1981), American linguist
- Bruce Baugh, game designer
- Bruce Baugh (philosopher), Canadian philosopher
- Carl Baugh (born 1936), American creationist
- Dan Baugh (born 1974), Canadian rugby union player
- Daniel A. Baugh (1931–2024), American historian of British naval administration
- Daniel Baugh Brewster (1923–2007), U.S. Senator from Maryland
- Dickie Baugh (1864–1929), English footballer
- Dickie Baugh Jr. (1902–1972), English footballer
- Jadan Baugh, American football player
- John Baugh (born 1949), linguist
- Kevin Baugh (born 1962), American micronationalist
- Marcus Baugh (born 1994), American football player
- Matt Baugh (born 1973), British ambassador
- Phil Baugh (1936–1990), American singer-songwriter
- Sammy Baugh (1914–2008), American football player
- Scott Baugh (born 1962), American politician
- Tom Baugh (born 1963), American football player
