= Black Country derby =

Football rivalry between West Brom, Walsall and Wolves

- Location: Black Country
- Teams: Walsall; West Bromwich Albion; Wolverhampton Wanderers
- First meeting: 2 January 1886; FA Cup; West Brom 3–2 Wolves
- Latest meeting: 20 September 2026; EFL Championship; Wolves 1–0 West Brom
- Next meeting: 20 February 2027; EFL Championship; West Brom v Wolves
- Stadiums: The Hawthorns (West Brom); Molineux Stadium (Wolves); Bescot Stadium (Walsall)

Statistics
- Total meetings: 195
- Most wins: West Brom (70)
- All-time series: West Brom: 70; Drawn: 54; Walsall: 10; Wolves: 61
- Largest victory: Wolves 0–8 West Brom; Football League First Division (27 December 1893)

The Black Country derby is the name given to any local derby between English football teams West Bromwich Albion, Walsall and Wolverhampton Wanderers. However, it most commonly refers specifically to games between West Bromwich Albion and Wolverhampton Wanderers due to Walsall spending most of their existence in lower divisions than the other two teams. All three clubs reside in Staffordshire's historic boundaries, but they are separated 11 miles (18 km) apart in the Black Country of the present-day West Midlands county.

The most successful side in the most common of Black Country derbies is West Bromwich Albion, losing just five of the past 25 matches between the two sides.

The Black Country derby between Wolverhampton Wanderers and West Bromwich Albion returned in the 2026–27 EFL Championship following Wolves' relegation from the Premier League and West Brom successfully avoiding relegation from the Championship. Walsall would spend the 2026–27 season in the League Two.

== History ==
=== Early history ===
Locations of the teams within the West Midlands county

The earliest Black Country derbies were contested before the formation of the Football League. The first ever derby took place on 20 January 1883, when Albion won 4–2 in the third round of the Birmingham Senior Cup. Wolves and Albion's first two 'official' meetings came in the FA Cup in 1886 and 1887, with Albion recording victories on both occasions and going on to reach the final in both years. The first of Walsall's fixtures against Wolves and Albion were also in the FA Cup, in 1889 and 1900 respectively.

With both West Bromwich Albion and Wolverhampton Wanderers being founder members of the Football League in 1888, the Black Country derby between these two teams is one of the oldest in the world in league football. The fixture was contested in each of the first 13 league seasons from 1888 to 1901. Attendances in these early fixtures were modest, but that was the case across much of the country as football gradually grew in popularity at the turn of the century. By the 1906–07 season, the fixtures began to regularly attract crowds above 20,000 and a more intense rivalry emerged.

=== Post-war zenith ===
The Albion–Wolves derby reached its peak in the 1950s when both sides challenged for honours at the top of English football, with each in the First Division from 1949 to 1965. Wolves enjoyed league and cup domination for a good deal of the 1950s; finishing in the top 3 on nine occasions, winning the title three times and FA Cup twice in this period. Albion were also a strong side, renowned for their attacking flair, and also challenged near the top of the league. They won the FA Cup in 1954.

It was the 1953–54 season in which the sides finished as the top 2 clubs in the country for the first and only time. Wolves won the league title, finishing four points ahead of the Baggies, despite Albion topping the table for the majority of the season. Wolves' league win coupled with Albion's cup win meant they contested the Charity Shield in 1954 – the only time the two teams have met in the final of any competition. The game finished 4–4 in front of a Molineux crowd of 45,035.

Throughout the rest of the century both sides met frequently, with a six-year period in the 1980s the longest gap without a meeting between the two Black Country rivals. Walsall's continued existence in the lower divisions meant they avoided any league meetings with either of their neighbours for decade after decade. However, in the 1980s they met Wolves for one season in 1985–86 and Albion for one season in 1988–89.

When the Premier League was formed in 1992 both Albion and Wolves were outside the top division but they continued to meet in the 'new' First Division throughout the 1990s. The rivalry remained intense and due to police concerns and televised games, the fixture has not been staged at the traditional English kick-off time of 3pm on a Saturday since 1996. Hooliganism in the fixtures was a big problem in the 1960s and the frictions between fanbases causes regular restrictions on local pubs on match days.

=== Modern meetings ===
Chart of yearly table positions of the Derby participants in the English football league

Following Walsall's unlikely promotion to the First Division in 1999, the 1999–2000 season represented the first time all three sides had ever been in the same division. Walsall took the bragging rights with a double over Albion and an away win at Molineux, while Albion and Wolves shared the spoils in both league fixtures. Albion and Walsall were in a battle with each other to avoid relegation and ultimately it was the Saddlers who faced the drop, putting an end to the three-way Black Country derbies after only one season.

A year later Walsall earned an immediate return to the First Division and once again all three sides occupied the same level in the 2001–02 season. This time around it was Albion and Wolves who were in direct competition in the league, with both sides going for promotion. Both fixtures against each other were in the first half of the season, with a 1–1 draw at the Hawthorns and a 1–0 victory for Albion at Molineux. By 6 March 2002, after 38 games of the season, Wolves were ten points ahead of Albion but gained only 9 more points compared to Albion's 22 in the last eight matches and the Baggies clinched automatic promotion in second place on the final day of the season. Wolves were subsequently beaten in the play-offs by Norwich.

The Baggies were relegated from the Premier League after only one season and saw Wolves take their place in the top flight. To rub even more salt into the wounds, a Paul Merson-inspired Walsall side thumped them 4–1 on the opening day of the 2003–04 season. But it was Albion who had the last laugh, as they were promoted once again and Walsall's stint in the second tier came to an end as they dropped into League One.

After a five-year break without a derby between Albion and Wolves the 2006–07 season saw the teams meet a record five times. Albion won the first meeting 3–0 at the Hawthorns before Wolves won the return fixture 1–0 at Molineux. The clubs also met in the FA Cup fourth round, with Albion triumphing 3–0 at Molineux – a major riot followed in the city centre as hundreds of fans clashed. At the end of the season the clubs finished level on points and met in the Championship play-offs. Both legs were won by Albion, sending them through to the final 4–2 on aggregate. However, they lost 1–0 in the final to Derby at Wembley.

In the 2010–11 season the two sides met for the first time in the Premier League, marking the first top flight derby in nearly 27 years. The first league meeting at the Hawthorns ended 1–1 with Jamie O'Hara giving Wolves a first-half lead before an injury time equaliser from Albion's Carlos Vela earned the Baggies a point. In the return fixture at Molineux, Wolves claimed the bragging rights with a 3–1 win. The victory was particularly crucial in helping Wolves escape relegation.

The latest meetings between Albion and Wolves were in the 2011–12 season when both clubs, again, competed in the top flight. Albion claimed a league double over their bitter rivals for the first time since 1997–98. A 2–0 win at the Hawthorns was followed by a 5–1 demolition of Wolves away at Molineux where Peter Odemwingie grabbed a hat-trick. Wolves manager Mick McCarthy was sacked the next day and Wolves were relegated from the Premier League at the end of the season.

Wolves' demise continued and they found themselves relegated again the following season, meeting up with Walsall in League One in 2013–14. The two Black Country rivals met twice in the league and once in the Football League Trophy. The most recent derby being a 3–0 victory for Wolves at Bescot Stadium on 8 March 2014.

The 2020–21 season saw Wolves and Albion- the latter, who had won promotion the season before- clash for the first time in 9 years. Their first meeting at the Molineux on 16 January 2021 ended in a 3–2 win for Albion, with two penalties from Matheus Pereira and a goal from Semi Ajayi winning the match for WBA. Albion were relegated at the end of the season.

Since the 2021–22 season the three clubs are in three different divisions, as Wolves compete in the Premier League, Albion in the EFL Championship, and Walsall in the EFL League Two.

In January 2024, in the FA Cup, Wolves and West Brom played in front of fans for the first time in a dozen years with Wolves winning at The Hawthorns for the first time since 1996. However, the game was marred by fighting after supporters of Wolves were in the home end near where the Albion players families were sat. A number of Albion fans then preceded to storm the pitch.

== List of derbies ==
=== Albion–Wolves ===
#	Season	Date	Competition	Stadium	Home team	Result	Away team	Attendance	H2H
1	1885–86	2 January 1886	FA Cup	Stoney Lane	West Bromwich Albion	3–1	Wolverhampton Wanderers	5,196	+1
2	1887–88	26 November 1887	FA Cup	Stoney Lane	West Bromwich Albion	2–0	Wolverhampton Wanderers	7,429	+2
3	1888–89	15 December 1888	Division 1	Dudley Road	Wolverhampton Wanderers	2–1	West Bromwich Albion	8,600	+1
4	1888–89	5 January 1889	Division 1	Stoney Lane	West Bromwich Albion	1–3	Wolverhampton Wanderers	4,000	0
5	1889–90	19 October 1889	Division 1	Stoney Lane	West Bromwich Albion	1–4	Wolverhampton Wanderers	5,550	+1
6	1889–90	28 December 1889	Division 1	Molineux	Wolverhampton Wanderers	1–1	West Bromwich Albion	8,500	+1
7	1890–91	13 December 1890	Division 1	Stoney Lane	West Bromwich Albion	0–1	Wolverhampton Wanderers	4,300	+2
8	1890–91	3 January 1891	Division 1	Molineux	Wolverhampton Wanderers	4–0	West Bromwich Albion	9,300	+3
9	1891–92	19 September 1891	Division 1	Stoney Lane	West Bromwich Albion	4–3	Wolverhampton Wanderers	10,000	+2
10	1891–92	28 December 1891	Division 1	Molineux	Wolverhampton Wanderers	2–1	West Bromwich Albion	7,200	+3
11	1892–93	17 September 1892	Division 1	Stoney Lane	West Bromwich Albion	2–1	Wolverhampton Wanderers	4,000	+2
12	1892–93	27 December 1892	Division 1	Molineux	Wolverhampton Wanderers	1–1	West Bromwich Albion	8,000	+2
13	1893–94	7 October 1893	Division 1	Stoney Lane	West Bromwich Albion	0–0	Wolverhampton Wanderers	10,000	+2
14	1893–94	27 December 1893	Division 1	Molineux	Wolverhampton Wanderers	0–8	West Bromwich Albion	8,000	+1
15	1894–95	8 September 1894	Division 1	Stoney Lane	West Bromwich Albion	5–1	Wolverhampton Wanderers	5,100	0
16	1894–95	27 December 1894	Division 1	Molineux	Wolverhampton Wanderers	3–1	West Bromwich Albion	6,500	+1
17	1894–95	2 March 1895	FA Cup	Stoney Lane	West Bromwich Albion	1–0	Wolverhampton Wanderers	20,977	0
18	1895–96	30 November 1895	Division 1	Stoney Lane	West Bromwich Albion	2–1	Wolverhampton Wanderers	3,000	+1
19	1895–96	7 March 1896	Division 1	Molineux	Wolverhampton Wanderers	1–2	West Bromwich Albion	8,114	+2
20	1896–97	17 October 1896	Division 1	Stoney Lane	West Bromwich Albion	1–0	Wolverhampton Wanderers	6,000	+3
21	1896–97	28 December 1896	Division 1	Molineux	Wolverhampton Wanderers	6–1	West Bromwich Albion	11,561	+2
22	1897–98	23 October 1897	Division 1	Stoney Lane	West Bromwich Albion	2–2	Wolverhampton Wanderers	11,750	+2
23	1897–98	28 December 1897	Division 1	Molineux	Wolverhampton Wanderers	1–1	West Bromwich Albion	8,100	+2
24	1898–99	15 October 1898	Division 1	Stoney Lane	West Bromwich Albion	1–2	Wolverhampton Wanderers	6,457	+1
25	1898–99	27 December 1898	Division 1	Molineux	Wolverhampton Wanderers	5–1	West Bromwich Albion	12,052	0
26	1899–1900	4 November 1899	Division 1	Molineux	Wolverhampton Wanderers	2–0	West Bromwich Albion	10,089	+1
27	1899–1900	10 March 1900	Division 1	Stoney Lane	West Bromwich Albion	3–2	Wolverhampton Wanderers	6,680	0
28	1900–01	1 September 1900	Division 1	Molineux	Wolverhampton Wanderers	0–0	West Bromwich Albion	12,000	0
29	1900–01	29 December 1900	Division 1	The Hawthorns	West Bromwich Albion	1–2	Wolverhampton Wanderers	18,188	+1
30	1902–03	4 October 1902	Division 1	Molineux	Wolverhampton Wanderers	1–2	West Bromwich Albion	14,072	0
31	1902–03	31 January 1903	Division 1	The Hawthorns	West Bromwich Albion	2–2	Wolverhampton Wanderers	26,081	0
32	1903–04	7 December 1903	Division 1	Molineux	Wolverhampton Wanderers	1–0	West Bromwich Albion	12,431	+1
33	1903–04	5 March 1904	Division 1	The Hawthorns	West Bromwich Albion	1–2	Wolverhampton Wanderers	6,338	+2
34	1906–07	29 September 1906	Division 2	Molineux	Wolverhampton Wanderers	0–3	West Bromwich Albion	25,000	+1
35	1906–07	1 April 1907	Division 2	The Hawthorns	West Bromwich Albion	1–1	Wolverhampton Wanderers	28,000	+1
36	1907–08	2 September 1907	Division 2	Molineux	Wolverhampton Wanderers	1–2	West Bromwich Albion	24,000	0
37	1907–08	5 October 1907	Division 2	The Hawthorns	West Bromwich Albion	1–0	Wolverhampton Wanderers	30,026	+1
38	1908–09	7 September 1908	Division 2	The Hawthorns	West Bromwich Albion	0–2	Wolverhampton Wanderers	30,600	0
39	1908–09	3 October 1908	Division 2	Molineux	Wolverhampton Wanderers	0–1	West Bromwich Albion	20,000	+1
40	1909–10	16 October 1909	Division 2	Molineux	Wolverhampton Wanderers	3–1	West Bromwich Albion	24,000	0
41	1909–10	25 December 1909	Division 2	The Hawthorns	West Bromwich Albion	0–1	Wolverhampton Wanderers	24,899	+1
42	1910–11	12 November 1910	Division 2	Molineux	Wolverhampton Wanderers	2–3	West Bromwich Albion	18,500	0
43	1910–11	18 March 1911	Division 2	The Hawthorns	West Bromwich Albion	2–1	Wolverhampton Wanderers	26,303	+1
44	1923–24	23 February 1924	FA Cup	The Hawthorns	West Bromwich Albion	1–1	Wolverhampton Wanderers	55,849	+1
45	1923–24	27 February 1924	FA Cup	Molineux	Wolverhampton Wanderers	0–2	West Bromwich Albion	40,083	+2
46	1927–28	8 October 1927	Division 2	Molineux	Wolverhampton Wanderers	4–1	West Bromwich Albion	40,	+1
47	1927–28	18 February 1928	Division 2	The Hawthorns	West Bromwich Albion	4–0	Wolverhampton Wanderers	37,342	+2
48	1928–29	10 November 1928	Division 2	The Hawthorns	West Bromwich Albion	0–2	Wolverhampton Wanderers	24,902	+1
49	1928–29	23 March 1929	Division 2	Molineux	Wolverhampton Wanderers	0–1	West Bromwich Albion	24,340	+2
50	1929–30	31 August 1929	Division 2	Molineux	Wolverhampton Wanderers	2–4	West Bromwich Albion	25,961	+3
51	1929–30	28 December 1929	Division 2	The Hawthorns	West Bromwich Albion	7–3	Wolverhampton Wanderers	20,311	+4
52	1930–31	11 October 1930	Division 2	The Hawthorns	West Bromwich Albion	2–1	Wolverhampton Wanderers	40,065	+5
53	1930–31	18 February 1931	Division 2	Molineux	Wolverhampton Wanderers	1–4	West Bromwich Albion	36,054	+6
54	1930–31	28 February 1931	FA Cup	The Hawthorns	West Bromwich Albion	1–1	Wolverhampton Wanderers	52,385	+6
55	1930–31	4 March 1931	FA Cup	Molineux	Wolverhampton Wanderers	1–2	West Bromwich Albion	46,860	+7
56	1932–33	8 October 1932	Division 1	The Hawthorns	West Bromwich Albion	4–1	Wolverhampton Wanderers	31,068	+8
57	1932–33	18 February 1933	Division 1	Molineux	Wolverhampton Wanderers	3–3	West Bromwich Albion	34,534	+8
58	1933–34	7 October 1933	Division 1	Molineux	Wolverhampton Wanderers	0–0	West Bromwich Albion	37,308	+8
59	1933–34	17 February 1934	Division 1	The Hawthorns	West Bromwich Albion	2–0	Wolverhampton Wanderers	24,892	+9
60	1934–35	13 October 1934	Division 1	Molineux	Wolverhampton Wanderers	3–2	West Bromwich Albion	35,386	+8
61	1934–35	23 February 1935	Division 1	The Hawthorns	West Bromwich Albion	5–2	Wolverhampton Wanderers	31,494	+9
62	1935–36	26 October 1935	Division 1	The Hawthorns	West Bromwich Albion	2–1	Wolverhampton Wanderers	43,406	+10
63	1935–36	14 March 1936	Division 1	Molineux	Wolverhampton Wanderers	2–0	West Bromwich Albion	34,790	+9
64	1936–37	17 October 1936	Division 1	The Hawthorns	West Bromwich Albion	2–1	Wolverhampton Wanderers	33,962	+10
65	1936–37	14 April 1937	Division 1	Molineux	Wolverhampton Wanderers	5–2	West Bromwich Albion	28,486	+9
66	1937–38	27 December 1937	Division 1	The Hawthorns	West Bromwich Albion	2–2	Wolverhampton Wanderers	55,444	+9
67	1937–38	2 May 1938	Division 1	Molineux	Wolverhampton Wanderers	2–1	West Bromwich Albion	43,639	+8
68	1948–49	26 February 1949	FA Cup	Molineux	Wolverhampton Wanderers	1–0	West Bromwich Albion	55,684	+7
69	1949–50	15 October 1949	Division 1	Molineux	Wolverhampton Wanderers	1–1	West Bromwich Albion	56,661	+7
70	1949–50	4 March 1950	Division 1	The Hawthorns	West Bromwich Albion	1–1	Wolverhampton Wanderers	60,945	+7
71	1950–51	2 December 1950	Division 1	Molineux	Wolverhampton Wanderers	3–1	West Bromwich Albion	45,087	+6
72	1950–51	21 April 1951	Division 1	The Hawthorns	West Bromwich Albion	3–2	Wolverhampton Wanderers	38,933	+7
73	1951–52	14 April 1952	Division 1	The Hawthorns	West Bromwich Albion	2–1	Wolverhampton Wanderers	36,429	+8
74	1951–52	15 April 1952	Division 1	Molineux	Wolverhampton Wanderers	1–4	West Bromwich Albion	48,940	+9
75	1952–53	18 October 1952	Division 1	The Hawthorns	West Bromwich Albion	1–1	Wolverhampton Wanderers	54,480	+9
76	1952–53	7 March 1953	Division 1	Molineux	Wolverhampton Wanderers	2–0	West Bromwich Albion	48,375	+8
77	1953–54	14 November 1953	Division 1	Molineux	Wolverhampton Wanderers	1–0	West Bromwich Albion	56,590	+7
78	1953–54	3 April 1954	Division 1	The Hawthorns	West Bromwich Albion	0–1	Wolverhampton Wanderers	58,884	+6
79	1954–55	29 September 1954	Charity Shield	Molineux	Wolverhampton Wanderers	4–4	West Bromwich Albion	45,035	+6
80	1954–55	23 October 1954	Division 1	Molineux	Wolverhampton Wanderers	4–0	West Bromwich Albion	55,374	+5
81	1954–55	16 March 1955	Division 1	The Hawthorns	West Bromwich Albion	1–0	Wolverhampton Wanderers	28,573	+6
82	1955–56	20 August 1955	Division 1	The Hawthorns	West Bromwich Albion	1–1	Wolverhampton Wanderers	50,306	+6
83	1955–56	17 December 1955	Division 1	Molineux	Wolverhampton Wanderers	3–2	West Bromwich Albion	31,068	+5
84	1955–56	7 January 1956	FA Cup	Molineux	Wolverhampton Wanderers	1–2	West Bromwich Albion	55,564	+6
85	1956–57	6 October 1956	Division 1	The Hawthorns	West Bromwich Albion	1–1	Wolverhampton Wanderers	34,379	+6
86	1956–57	15 April 1957	Division 1	Molineux	Wolverhampton Wanderers	5–2	West Bromwich Albion	27,942	+5
87	1957–58	16 November 1957	Division 1	Molineux	Wolverhampton Wanderers	1–1	West Bromwich Albion	55,618	+5
88	1957–58	29 March 1958	Division 1	The Hawthorns	West Bromwich Albion	0–3	Wolverhampton Wanderers	56,904	+4
89	1958–59	1 November 1958	Division 1	The Hawthorns	West Bromwich Albion	2–1	Wolverhampton Wanderers	55,498	+5
90	1958–59	21 March 1959	Division 1	Molineux	Wolverhampton Wanderers	5–2	West Bromwich Albion	44,240	+4
91	1959–60	5 December 1959	Division 1	The Hawthorns	West Bromwich Albion	0–1	Wolverhampton Wanderers	48,739	+3
92	1959–60	27 February 1960	Division 1	Molineux	Wolverhampton Wanderers	3–1	West Bromwich Albion	49,791	+2
93	1960–61	28 January 1961	Division 1	Molineux	Wolverhampton Wanderers	4–2	West Bromwich Albion	31,385	+1
94	1960–61	3 April 1961	Division 1	The Hawthorns	West Bromwich Albion	2–1	Wolverhampton Wanderers	34,108	+2
95	1961–62	26 December 1961	Division 1	The Hawthorns	West Bromwich Albion	1–1	Wolverhampton Wanderers	24,778	+2
96	1961–62	27 January 1962	FA Cup	Molineux	Wolverhampton Wanderers	1–2	West Bromwich Albion	46,411	+3
97	1961–62	28 March 1962	Division 1	Molineux	Wolverhampton Wanderers	1–5	West Bromwich Albion	20,558	+4
98	1962–63	16 March 1963	Division 1	Molineux	Wolverhampton Wanderers	7–0	West Bromwich Albion	22,618	+3
99	1962–63	3 April 1963	Division 1	The Hawthorns	West Bromwich Albion	2–2	Wolverhampton Wanderers	15,517	+3
100	1963–64	2 October 1963	Division 1	Molineux	Wolverhampton Wanderers	0–0	West Bromwich Albion	37,338	+3
101	1963–64	29 February 1964	Division 1	The Hawthorns	West Bromwich Albion	3–1	Wolverhampton Wanderers	19,839	+4
102	1964–65	10 October 1964	Division 1	The Hawthorns	West Bromwich Albion	5–1	Wolverhampton Wanderers	23,006	+5
103	1964–65	15 March 1965	Division 1	Molineux	Wolverhampton Wanderers	3–2	West Bromwich Albion	26,722	+4
104	1967–68	23 August 1967	Division 1	Molineux	Wolverhampton Wanderers	3–3	West Bromwich Albion	52,438	+4
105	1967–68	30 August 1967	Division 1	The Hawthorns	West Bromwich Albion	4–1	Wolverhampton Wanderers	44,573	+5
106	1968–69	21 September 1968	Division 1	The Hawthorns	West Bromwich Albion	0–0	Wolverhampton Wanderers	23,006	+5
107	1968–69	12 April 1969	Division 1	Molineux	Wolverhampton Wanderers	0–1	West Bromwich Albion	26,722	+6
108	1969–70	1 November 1969	Division 1	Molineux	Wolverhampton Wanderers	1–0	West Bromwich Albion	39,832	+5
109	1969–70	28 February 1970	Division 1	The Hawthorns	West Bromwich Albion	3–3	Wolverhampton Wanderers	37,819	+5
110	1970–71	7 November 1970	Division 1	Molineux	Wolverhampton Wanderers	2–1	West Bromwich Albion	39,300	+4
111	1970–71	20 March 1971	Division 1	The Hawthorns	West Bromwich Albion	2–4	Wolverhampton Wanderers	36,754	+3
112	1971–72	27 November 1971	Division 1	The Hawthorns	West Bromwich Albion	2–3	Wolverhampton Wanderers	37,696	+2
113	1971–72	15 April 1972	Division 1	Molineux	Wolverhampton Wanderers	0–1	West Bromwich Albion	30,319	+3
114	1972–73	21 October 1972	Division 1	The Hawthorns	West Bromwich Albion	1–0	Wolverhampton Wanderers	31,121	+4
115	1972–73	20 March 1973	Division 1	Molineux	Wolverhampton Wanderers	2–0	West Bromwich Albion	33,520	+3
116	1977–78	17 September 1977	Division 1	The Hawthorns	West Bromwich Albion	2–2	Wolverhampton Wanderers	31,359	+3
117	1977–78	14 March 1978	Division 1	Molineux	Wolverhampton Wanderers	1–1	West Bromwich Albion	29,757	+3
118	1978–79	16 December 1978	Division 1	Molineux	Wolverhampton Wanderers	0–3	West Bromwich Albion	29,117	+4
119	1978–79	21 April 1979	Division 1	The Hawthorns	West Bromwich Albion	1–1	Wolverhampton Wanderers	32,395	+4
120	1979–80	24 November 1979	Division 1	Molineux	Wolverhampton Wanderers	0–0	West Bromwich Albion	32,564	+4
121	1979–80	19 April 1980	Division 1	The Hawthorns	West Bromwich Albion	0–0	Wolverhampton Wanderers	30,843	+4
122	1980–81	23 August 1980	Division 1	The Hawthorns	West Bromwich Albion	1–1	Wolverhampton Wanderers	26,324	+4
123	1980–81	31 January 1981	Division 1	Molineux	Wolverhampton Wanderers	2–0	West Bromwich Albion	29,764	+3
124	1981–82	5 December 1981	Division 1	The Hawthorns	West Bromwich Albion	3–0	Wolverhampton Wanderers	23,329	+4
125	1981–82	1 May 1982	Division 1	Molineux	Wolverhampton Wanderers	1–2	West Bromwich Albion	19,813	+5
126	1983–84	26 November 1983	Division 1	The Hawthorns	West Bromwich Albion	1–3	Wolverhampton Wanderers	18,914	+4
127	1983–84	28 April 1984	Division 1	Molineux	Wolverhampton Wanderers	0–0	West Bromwich Albion	13,208	+4
128	1989–90	15 October 1989	Division 2	The Hawthorns	West Bromwich Albion	1–2	Wolverhampton Wanderers	21,316	+3
129	1989–90	20 March 1990	Division 2	Molineux	Wolverhampton Wanderers	2–1	West Bromwich Albion	24,475	+2
130	1990–91	29 December 1990	Division 2	The Hawthorns	West Bromwich Albion	1–1	Wolverhampton Wanderers	28,310	+2
131	1990–91	6 April 1991	Division 2	Molineux	Wolverhampton Wanderers	2–2	West Bromwich Albion	22,982	+2
132	1993–94	5 September 1993	Division 1	The Hawthorns	West Bromwich Albion	3–2	Wolverhampton Wanderers	26,615	+3
133	1993–94	26 February 1994	Division 1	Molineux	Wolverhampton Wanderers	1–2	West Bromwich Albion	28,039	+4
134	1994–95	28 August 1994	Division 1	Molineux	Wolverhampton Wanderers	2–0	West Bromwich Albion	27,764	+3
135	1994–95	15 March 1995	Division 1	The Hawthorns	West Bromwich Albion	2–0	Wolverhampton Wanderers	20,661	+4
136	1995–96	20 August 1995	Division 1	Molineux	Wolverhampton Wanderers	1–1	West Bromwich Albion	26,329	+4
137	1995–96	13 January 1996	Division 1	The Hawthorns	West Bromwich Albion	0–0	Wolverhampton Wanderers	21,658	+4
138	1996–97	15 September 1996	Division 1	The Hawthorns	West Bromwich Albion	2–4	Wolverhampton Wanderers	21,791	+3
139	1996–97	12 January 1997	Division 1	Molineux	Wolverhampton Wanderers	2–0	West Bromwich Albion	27,336	+2
140	1997–98	24 August 1997	Division 1	The Hawthorns	West Bromwich Albion	1–0	Wolverhampton Wanderers	22,511	+3
141	1997–98	31 January 1998	Division 1	Molineux	Wolverhampton Wanderers	0–1	West Bromwich Albion	28,244	+4
142	1998–99	29 November 1998	Division 1	The Hawthorns	West Bromwich Albion	2–0	Wolverhampton Wanderers	22,682	+5
143	1998–99	25 April 1999	Division 1	Molineux	Wolverhampton Wanderers	1–1	West Bromwich Albion	27,038	+5
144	1999–2000	3 October 1999	Division 1	Molineux	Wolverhampton Wanderers	1–1	West Bromwich Albion	25,500	+5
145	1999–2000	31 October 1999	Division 1	The Hawthorns	West Bromwich Albion	1–1	Wolverhampton Wanderers	21,097	+5
146	2000–01	17 October 2000	Division 1	The Hawthorns	West Bromwich Albion	1–0	Wolverhampton Wanderers	21,492	+6
147	2000–01	18 March 2001	Division 1	Molineux	Wolverhampton Wanderers	3–1	West Bromwich Albion	25,069	+5
148	2001–02	25 October 2001	Division 1	The Hawthorns	West Bromwich Albion	1–1	Wolverhampton Wanderers	26,143	+5
149	2001–02	2 December 2001	Division 1	Molineux	Wolverhampton Wanderers	0–1	West Bromwich Albion	27,515	+6
150	2006–07	22 October 2006	Championship	The Hawthorns	West Bromwich Albion	3–0	Wolverhampton Wanderers	26,606	+7
151	2006–07	28 January 2007	FA Cup	Molineux	Wolverhampton Wanderers	0–3	West Bromwich Albion	28,016	+8
152	2006–07	11 March 2007	Championship	Molineux	Wolverhampton Wanderers	1–0	West Bromwich Albion	28,107	+7
153	2006–07	13 May 2007	Championship Playoffs	Molineux	Wolverhampton Wanderers	2–3	West Bromwich Albion	27,750	+8
154	2006–07	16 May 2007	Championship Playoffs	The Hawthorns	West Bromwich Albion	1–0	Wolverhampton Wanderers	27,415	+9
155	2007–08	25 November 2007	Championship	The Hawthorns	West Bromwich Albion	0–0	Wolverhampton Wanderers	27,493	+9
156	2007–08	15 April 2008	Championship	Molineux	Wolverhampton Wanderers	0–1	West Bromwich Albion	27,883	+10
157	2010–11	20 February 2011	Premier League	The Hawthorns	West Bromwich Albion	1–1	Wolverhampton Wanderers	26,170	+10
158	2010–11	8 May 2011	Premier League	Molineux	Wolverhampton Wanderers	3–1	West Bromwich Albion	28,510	+9
159	2011–12	16 October 2011	Premier League	The Hawthorns	West Bromwich Albion	2–0	Wolverhampton Wanderers	24,872	+10
160	2011–12	12 February 2012	Premier League	Molineux	Wolverhampton Wanderers	1–5	West Bromwich Albion	27,131	+11
161	2020–21	16 January 2021	Premier League	Molineux	Wolverhampton Wanderers	2–3	West Bromwich Albion	0	+12
162	2020–21	3 May 2021	Premier League	The Hawthorns	West Bromwich Albion	1–1	Wolverhampton Wanderers	0	+12
163	2023–24	28 January 2024	FA Cup	The Hawthorns	West Bromwich Albion	0–2	Wolverhampton Wanderers	25,013	+11
164	2026–27	20 September 2026	Championship	Molineux	Wolverhampton Wanderers	1–0	West Bromwich Albion	30,892	+10
165	2026–27	20 February 2027	Championship	The Hawthorns	West Bromwich Albion		Wolverhampton Wanderers		+

==== Statistics ====
As of 20 September 2026

Competition	Matches	Albion wins	Draws	Wolves wins
League	149	55	41	53
League play-offs	2	2	0	0
FA Cup	12	8	2	2
Charity Shield	1	0	1	0
Total	164	65	44	55

==== Managers ====
Years	Matches	Albion manager	Albion wins	Draw	Wolves wins	Wolves manager
1886–90	6	n/a	2	1	3	(England) Jack Addenbrooke
1890–92	4	(England) Louis Ford	1	0	3	(England) Jack Addenbrooke
1892–94	4	(England) Henry Jackson	2	2	0	(England) Jack Addenbrooke
1894–95	3	(England) Edward Stephenson	2	0	1	(England) Jack Addenbrooke
1895–96	2	(England) Clement Keys	2	0	0	(England) Jack Addenbrooke
1896–02	10	(England) Frank Heaven	2	3	5	(England) Jack Addenbrooke
1902–22	14	(England) Fred Everiss	7	2	5	(England) Jack Addenbrooke
1922–24	2	(England) Fred Everiss	1	1	0	(England) George Jobey
1927–44	22	(England) Fred Everiss	12	4	6	(England) Frank Buckley
1948–52	7	(Wales) Jack Smith	3	2	2	(England) Stan Cullis
1952–53	1	(England) Jesse Carver	0	1	0	(England) Stan Cullis
1953–59	15	(England) Vic Buckingham	3	4	8	(England) Stan Cullis
1959–61	4	(England) Gordon Clark	1	0	3	(England) Stan Cullis
1961–63	4	(Scotland) Archie Macaulay	2	1	1	(England) Stan Cullis
1963–64	3	(England) Jimmy Hagan	1	2	0	(England) Stan Cullis
1964–65	2	(England) Jimmy Hagan	1	0	1	(Scotland) Andy Beattie
1967–68	3	(England) Alan Ashman	1	2	0	(England) Ronnie Allen
1968–71	5	(England) Alan Ashman	1	1	3	(England) Bill McGarry
1971–75	4	(England) Don Howe	2	0	2	(England) Bill McGarry
1977	1	(England) Ronnie Allen	0	1	0	(England) Sammy Chung
1978	1	(England) Ron Atkinson	0	1	0	(England) Sammy Chung
1978–81	6	(England) Ron Atkinson	1	4	1	(England) John Barnwell
1981–82	1	(England) Ronnie Allen	1	0	0	(England) John Barnwell
1982	1	(England) Ronnie Allen	1	0	0	(England) Ian Greaves
1982–84	1	(Scotland) Ron Wylie	0	0	1	(England) Graham Hawkins
1984	1	(Republic of Ireland) Johnny Giles	0	1	0	(England) Graham Hawkins
1988–91	3	(England) Brian Talbot	0	1	2	(England) Graham Turner
1991–92	1	(England) Bobby Gould	0	1	0	(England) Graham Turner
1993–94	2	(England) Keith Burkinshaw	2	0	0	(England) Graham Turner
1994	1	(England) Keith Burkinshaw	0	0	1	(England) Graham Taylor
1994–95	2	(England) Alan Buckley	1	1	0	(England) Graham Taylor
1995–97	3	(England) Alan Buckley	0	1	2	(Scotland) Mark McGhee
1997	1	(England) Ray Harford	1	0	0	(Scotland) Mark McGhee
1997–98	2	(England) Denis Smith	2	0	0	(Scotland) Mark McGhee
1998–99	1	(England) Denis Smith	0	1	0	(England) Colin Lee
1999–2000	2	(England) Brian Little	0	2	0	(England) Colin Lee
2000	1	(England) Gary Megson	1	0	0	(England) Colin Lee
2001–04	3	(England) Gary Megson	1	1	1	(England) Dave Jones
2006–09	7	(England) Tony Mowbray	5	1	1	(Republic of Ireland) Mick McCarthy
2011–12	4	(England) Roy Hodgson	2	1	1	(Republic of Ireland) Mick McCarthy
2020–21	2	(England) Sam Allardyce	1	1	0	(Portugal) Nuno Espírito Santo
2024	1	(Spain) Carlos Corberán	0	0	1	(England) Gary O'Neil
2026–27	1	(Scotland) James Morrison	0	0	1	(Portugal) César Peixoto

==== Honours ====
Albion	Competition	Wolves
Domestic
1	First Division titles	3
5	FA Cup	4
1	League Cup	2
2	Charity Shield	4
9	Aggregate	13

=== Walsall–Wolves ===
Season	Date	Competition	Stadium	Home team	Result	Away team	Attendance	H2H
1888–89	16 February 1889	FA Cup	Dudley Road	Wolverhampton Wanderers	6–1	Walsall Town Swifts	4,000	+1
1923–24	22 December 1923	Division 3N	Molineux	Wolverhampton Wanderers	0–0	Walsall	16,000	+1
1923–24	7 April 1924	Division 3N	Fellows Park	Walsall	2–1	Wolverhampton Wanderers	12,281	0
1985–86	20 August 1985	League Cup	Fellows Park	Walsall	1–1	Wolverhampton Wanderers	11,330	0
1985–86	3 September 1985	League Cup	Molineux	Wolverhampton Wanderers	0–1	Walsall	11,310	+1
1985–86	19 October 1985	Division 3	Molineux	Wolverhampton Wanderers	0–0	Walsall	7,522	+1
1985–86	9 February 1986	Division 3	Fellows Park	Walsall	1–1	Wolverhampton Wanderers	10,480	+1
1999–2000	28 August 1999	Division 1	Molineux	Wolverhampton Wanderers	1–2	Walsall	24,439	+2
1999–2000	29 January 2000	Division 1	Bescot Stadium	Walsall	1–1	Wolverhampton Wanderers	9,422	+2
2001–02	21 September 2001	Division 1	Bescot Stadium	Walsall	0–3	Wolverhampton Wanderers	8,327	+1
2001–02	26 February 2002	Division 1	Molineux	Wolverhampton Wanderers	3–0	Walsall	27,043	0
2002–03	14 August 2002	Division 1	Molineux	Wolverhampton Wanderers	3–1	Walsall	27,904	+1
2002–03	11 January 2003	Division 1	Bescot Stadium	Walsall	0–1	Wolverhampton Wanderers	11,037	+2
2013–14	3 September 2013	FL Trophy	Molineux	Wolverhampton Wanderers	2–2 (4–2p)	Walsall	13,481	+2
2013–14	17 September 2013	League One	Molineux	Wolverhampton Wanderers	0–1	Walsall	22,240	+1
2013–14	8 March 2014	League One	Bescot Stadium	Walsall	0–3	Wolverhampton Wanderers	10,139	+2

==== Statistics ====
Competition	Matches	Walsall wins	Draws	Wolves wins
League	12	3	4	5
FA Cup	1	0	0	1
League Cup	2	1	1	0
EFL Trophy	1	0	1	0
Total	16	4	6	6

==== Managers ====
Years	Matches	Walsall manager	Walsall wins	Draw	Wolves wins	Wolves manager
1889	1	(England) H. Smallwood	0	0	1	(England) Jack Addenbrooke
1923–24	2	(England) Joe Burchell	1	1	0	(England) George Jobey
1985	3	(England) Alan Buckley	1	2	0	(England) Bill McGarry
1986	1	(England) Alan Buckley	0	1	0	(Northern Ireland) Sammy Chapman
1999–2000	2	(England) Ray Graydon	1	1	0	(England) Colin Lee
2001	1	(England) Ray Graydon	0	0	1	(England) Dave Jones
2002–03	3	(England) Colin Lee	0	0	3	(England) Dave Jones
2013–14	3	(England) Dean Smith	1	1	1	(Wales) Kenny Jackett

==== Honours ====
Walsall	Competition	Wolves
Domestic
0	First division titles	3
0	FA Cup	4
0	League Cup	2
0	Aggregate	9

=== Walsall–Albion ===
Season	Date	Competition	Stadium	Home team	Result	Away team	Attendance	H2H
1899–1900	27 January 1900	FA Cup	Fellows Park	Walsall Town Swifts	1–1	West Bromwich Albion	9,106	0
1899–1900	1 February 1900	FA Cup	Stoney Lane	West Bromwich Albion	6–1	Walsall Town Swifts	4,892	+1
1965–66	22 September 1965	League Cup	The Hawthorns	West Bromwich Albion	3–1	Walsall	41,188	+2
1987–88	19 August 1987	League Cup	The Hawthorns	West Bromwich Albion	2–3	Walsall	9,605	+1
1987–88	25 August 1987	League Cup	Fellows Park	Walsall	0–0	West Bromwich Albion	8,965	+1
1988–89	17 September 1988	Division 2	The Hawthorns	West Bromwich Albion	0–0	Walsall	13,977	+1
1988–89	1 April 1989	Division 2	Fellows Park	Walsall	0–0	West Bromwich Albion	9,520	+1
1992–93	4 January 1993	FL Trophy	The Hawthorns	West Bromwich Albion	4–0	Walsall	6,702	+2
1999–2000	16 October 1999	Division 1	The Hawthorns	West Bromwich Albion	0–1	Walsall	19,562	+1
1999–2000	22 April 2000	Division 1	Bescot Stadium	Walsall	2–1	West Bromwich Albion	9,161	0
2001–02	11 August 2001	Division 1	Bescot Stadium	Walsall	2–1	West Bromwich Albion	9,181	+1
2001–02	20 January 2002	Division 1	The Hawthorns	West Bromwich Albion	1–0	Walsall	20,290	0
2003–04	9 August 2003	Division 1	Bescot Stadium	Walsall	4–1	West Bromwich Albion	11,030	+1
2003–04	9 January 2004	Division 1	The Hawthorns	West Bromwich Albion	2–0	Walsall	24,558	0

==== Statistics ====
Competition	Matches	Walsall wins	Draws	Albion wins
League	8	4	2	2
FA Cup	2	0	1	1
League Cup	3	1	1	1
FL Trophy	2	1	0	1
Total	15	6	4	5

==== Managers ====
Years	Matches	Walsall manager	Walsall wins	Draw	Albion wins	Albion manager
1900	2	(England) Louis Ford	0	1	1	(England) Frank Heaven
1965	1	(England) Ray Shaw	0	0	1	(England) Jimmy Hagan
1987	2	(Scotland) Tommy Coakley	1	1	0	(England) Ron Saunders
1988	1	(Scotland) Tommy Coakley	0	1	0	(England) Ron Atkinson
1989	1	(Republic of Ireland) John Barnwell	0	1	0	(England) Brian Talbot
1993	1	(England) Kenny Hibbitt	0	0	1	(Argentina) Ossie Ardiles
1999	1	(England) Ray Graydon	1	0	0	(England) Brian Little
2000–02	3	(England) Ray Graydon	2	0	1	(England) Gary Megson
2003–04	2	(England) Colin Lee	1	0	1	(England) Gary Megson

==== Honours ====
Walsall	Competition	Albion
Domestic
0	First division titles	1
0	FA Cup	5
0	League Cup	1
0	Aggregate	7

== Crossing the divide ==
=== Albion–Walsall ===
Player	West Bromwich Albion career			Walsall career		
Player	Span	League apps	League goals	Span	League apps	League goals
(England) Darren Rogers	1988–1992	14	1	1994-1997	58	0
(England) Darren Bradley	1986–1995	254	9	1995–1997	71	1
(England) Graham Fenton	1994	7	3	2000	9	1
(England) Brett Angell	1996	3	0	2000–2002	61	16
(England) Matt Carbon	1998–2001	113	5	2001–2004	55	2
(England) Gavin Ward	1989	0	0	2002–2003	7	0
(Senegal) Alassane N'Dour	2003–2004	2	0	2007–2008	9	1
(England) Adam Chambers	1999–2005	58	1	2011–2019	288	2
(England) Reuben Reid	2009–2011	0	0	2010–2011	18	3
(England) James Chambers	1999–2004	71	0	2012–2015	93	1
(England) Sam Mantom	2010–2013	0	0	2012–2016	121	15
(England) Paul Downing	2009–2012	0	0	2012–2016	156	6
(Northern Ireland) Chris Baird	2014–2015	19	0	2003	10	0
(Saint Kitts and Nevis) Romaine Sawyers	2009–2013; 2019–2022	0; 61	0; 1	2013–2016	136	16
(Republic of Ireland) Shaun Donnellan	2015–2018	0	0	2017–2018	10	0
(Wales) Tyler Roberts	2016–2018	1	0	2017–2018	17	5
(England) Jack Fitzwater	2015–2020	0	0	2018–2019	37	3
(England) Kane Wilson	2016–2020	0	0	2018–2019	14	0
(England) Max Melbourne	2017–2020	0	0	2021	20	1
(England) Jack Rose	2013–2017	0	0	2019–2022	22	0
(England) Joss Labadie	2008–2010	0	0	2021–2023	35	0
(Montserrat) Donervon Daniels	2011–2015	0	0	2022–2025	99	4
(The Gambia) Mo Faal	2021–2024	1	0	2024	20	6
(England) Reyes Cleary	2022–2025	2	0	2024–2025	3	0
(Jamaica) Kemar Roofe	2011–2015	0	0	2025–2026	2	0
(England) Rico Richards	2020–2023	1	0	2025–2026	10	0

=== Albion–Wolves ===
Player	West Bromwich Albion career			Wolverhampton Wanderers career		
Player	Span	League apps	League goals	Span	League apps	League goals
(England) Harry Aston	1879–1885	—	—	1885–1886	—	—
(England) Walter Perry	1888–1889; 1894	9; 1	4; 0	1889–1890	8	3
(England) George Woodhall	1883–1892	44	10	1892–1894	18	1
(England) Joe Butcher	1895	0	0	1892–1895	65	26
(England) Jack Chadburn	1900–1903	43	3	1897–1900	11	1
(England) Ted Pheasant	1904–1910	140	20	1895–1904	159	19
(England) Sid Corfield	1902–1903	–	–	1905–1909	44	3
(England) Adam Haywood	1905–1907	62	25	1901–1905	107	28
(England) Dick Betteley	1906–1912	85	0	1901–1906	115	1
(Scotland) Dickie Baugh Jr.	1924–1929	—	—	1918–1924	108	4
(England) Ray Crawford	1965–1966	14	6	1963–1965	57	39
(England) David Burnside	1955–1962	127	39	1966–1968	40	5
(Scotland) Danny Hegan	1969–1970	14	2	1970–1973	53	6
(England) Bobby Gould	1971–1972	52	18	1970–1971; 1975–1977	40; 34	18; 13
(England) Paul Bradshaw	1985–1986; 1988–1990	8; 6	0; 0	1977–1984	200	0
(England) Andy King	1981–1982	25	4	1985	28	10
(Scotland) Ally Robertson	1969–1986	506	9	1986–1990	107	0
(England) Andy Thompson	1985–1986	24	1	1986–1997	376	43
(England) Steve Bull	1985–1986	4	2	1986–1999	474	306
(England) Clive Whitehead	1981–1987	168	6	1986	2	0
(Scotland) Andy Gray	1987–1988	35	10	1979–1983	133	38
(Northern Ireland) Robbie Dennison	1985–1987	16	1	1987–1997	293	40
(England) Stacey North	1987–1990	98	0	1985	3	0
(South Africa) John Paskin	1988–1989	25	5	1989–1992	34	3
(England) Vince Bartram	1991	0	0	1985–1991	5	0
(England) Tony Lange	1992–1995	48	0	1988–1992	8	0
(England) Cyrille Regis	1977–1984	241	81	1993–1994	19	2
(England) Paul Edwards	1994–1996	51	0	1992–1994	46	0
(Grenada) Jason Roberts	2000–2004	91	25	1997–1998	0	0
(Scotland) Nigel Quashie	2006–2007	29	1	2009	3	0
(England) Frank Nouble	2010	3	0	2012–2013	2	0
(Poland) Tomasz Kuszczak	2004–2007	31	0	2014–2015	13	0
(England) Joleon Lescott	2014–2015	36	1	2000–2006	212	13
(Mali) Bakary Sako	2018–2019	5	0	2012–2015	118	36
(England) Jed Wallace	2022–2026	140	15	2015–2017	18	0
(England) Craig Dawson	2011–2019	194	14	2023–2025	57	2
(Austria) Andreas Weimann	2024	12	2	2017	19	2
(England) Adam Armstrong	2025	16	3	2026–present	19	3

=== Walsall–Wolves ===
Player	Walsall career			Wolverhampton Wanderers career		
Player	Span	League apps	League goals	Span	League apps	League goals
(England) Harry Wood	1884–1885; 1891	— —	— —	1885–1891; 1891–1898	60; 181	35; 74
(England) Harry Allen	1883–1886	—	—	1886–1894	123	8
(England) Dickie Baugh	1896–1897	6	0	1886–1896	185	1
(England) Bert Williams	1937–1945	25	0	1945–1959	381	0
(England) Henry Walters	1946–1953	254	2	1942–1946	0	0
(England) Dennis Wilshaw	1946–1948	74	24	1944–1957	211	105
(England) Johnny Hancocks	1938–1939	30	9	1946–1957	343	158
(England) Billy Crook	1954–1956	45	2	1943–1954	196	2
(England) Bill Guttridge	1954–1962	198	0	1951–1954	6	0
(England) Clive Ford	1964–1967	14	1	1964	2	0
(England) Gerry Harris	1966–1968	15	1	1953–1966	235	2
(England) Jimmy Murray	1967–1969	57	13	1955–1963	273	199
(England) Derek Clarke	1967–1968	6	2	1968–1970	5	0
(Republic of Ireland) Mick Kearns	1973–1979; 1982–1985	249; 26	0; 0	1979–1981	9	0
(Scotland) John Teasdale	1982–1983	13	3	1980–1982	8	0
(England) Mel Eves	1988–1989	0	0	1974–1984	180	44
(England) Paul Jones	1983–1989	143	15	1989–1991	14	0
(England) Paul McLoughlin	1991	9	4	1989–1991	28	4
(England) Wayne Clarke	1992–1993	39	21	1978–1984; 1991	148; 1	30; 0
(Republic of Ireland) David Kelly	1983–1988	147	63	1993–1995	83	26
(England) Jimmy Kelly	1993	10	2	1992–1996	7	0
(England) Derek Mountfield	1995–1998	99	2	1991–1994	83	4
(England) Mark Blake	1996–1998	61	5	1991	2	0
(England) Paul Simpson	1998	10	0	1997–2000	52	6
(Scotland) Tom Bennet	1999-2002	89	8	1988–1995	115	2
(England) Tony Daley	1999	7	0	1994–1998	21	3
(England) Tom Bennett	1999–2002	89	8	1988–1985	115	2
(Australia) Steve Corica	2002–2004	73	9	1996–2000	100	5
(England) Darren Bazeley	2002–2004	100	0	1999–2002	80	4
(France) Ludovic Pollet	2002–2003	5	0	1999–2003	78	7
(England) Tony Dinning	2003	7	0	2000-2001	35	6
(Wales) Carl Robinson	2003	11	1	1995-2002	154	19
(England) Vinny Samways	2003–2004	42	2	1995–1996	3	0
(England) Simon Osborn	2003–2006	113	15	1995–2001	162	11
(England) Neil Emblen	2003–2005	80	7	1994–1997; 1998–2001	89; 114	9; 7
(England) Chris Westwood	2005–2007	69	5	1995–1998	4	1
(England) Kevin Cooper	2007	7	0	2002–2005	62	9
(England) David Davis	2010	7	0	2009–2014	53	0
(Republic of Ireland) Aaron McCarey	2012–2013	14	0	2010–2016	5	0
(England) Ashley Hemmings	2012–2014	56	3	2009–2012	2	0
(Republic of Ireland) Anthony Forde	2014–2016	78	7	2011–2014	21	0
(England) Will Randall	2017	2	0	2016–2019	0	0
(England) Zeli Ismail	2017–2019	48	4	2012–2016	9	0
(Republic of Ireland) Connor Ronan	2018	11	0	2016–2023	8	0
(England) Matt Jarvis	2019	9	0	2007–2012	164	19
(Republic of Ireland) Stephen Ward	2021–2022	27	0	2007–2014	222	9
(England) Jackson Smith	2023–2024	25	0	2021–2023	0	0
(England) Harvey Griffiths	2023–2024	1	0	2023–2026	0	0
(Wales) Ryan Leak	2026–present	1	0	2016–2019	0	0

=== Played for all three ===
Player	West Bromwich Albion career			Wolverhampton Wanderers career			Walsall career		
Player	Span	League apps	League goals	Span	League apps	League goals	Span	League apps	League goals
(England) Peter Eastoe	1982–1985	31	8	1971–1973; 1985	6; 8	0; 0	1984	6	1
(England) Dave Barnett	1989–1990	0	0	1983–1985	0	0	1990	5	0
(England) Don Goodman	1987–1991	158	60	1994–1998	125	33	2001–2002	25	3
(Australia) Andy Petterson	2000	0	0	2002	0	0	2004	3	0
(Republic of Ireland) Keith Andrews	2012	14	2	1999–2005	65	0	2004	10	2
(England) Sam Johnstone	2018–2022	165	0	2024–present	19	0	2013	7	0
