= William Annis =

William Annis may refer to:

- Billy Annis (1874–1938), English football player
- William Annis, founding member of electronic pop band Null Device
- William Annis, American figure skater
