= Tombaugh (disambiguation) =

Tombaugh may refer to:

- Tom Baugh (born 1963, as Thomas Anthony Baugh), U.S. American football center
- Clyde Tombaugh (1906-1997, born Clyde William Tombaugh), astronomer who discovered the dwarf planet Pluto
- Tombaugh (crater), a crater on Mars named after Clyde Tombaugh, found in the Elysium quadrangle
- 1604 Tombaugh (1931 FH), the asteroid Tombaugh, named after Clyde Tombaugh, discovered by Carl Otto Lampland on 24 March 1931, at the Lowell Observatory
- Tombaugh Regio, a light-colored heart-shaped region on Pluto, named after Clyde Tombaugh
- Tombaugh Cliffs, ice-free cliffs in Antarctica, next to the Pluto Glacier, named after Clyde Tombaugh

== See also ==
- Tom (disambiguation)
- Baugh (surname)
