= 1882–83 Aston Villa F.C. season =

Aston Villa
1882–83 season
- President: W. M. Ellis
- FA Cup: 5th round

The 1882–83 English football season was Aston Villa's 4th season in the Football Association Cup, the top-level football competition at the time. 1883 saw an increased takeover by professionals in the English game with Lancashire-based clubs, in particular, attracting and paying a number of players (mostly from Scotland). This move away from amateurism was to prove an advantage for Villa, whose industrial Birmingham home gave them access to large numbers of potential supporters. This in turn meant they could afford to pay decent wages to players with the ticket revenue accrued.

There were debuts for Joe Simmonds, Thomas Bryan, David Anderson, Alf Harvey, Wally Roberts, Charles Apperley and Tommy Mason. As the season progressed, the now-professional Aston Villa had built up a squad made of the strongest players in the district, while rivals such as Aston Unity stayed within the FA rules on amateurism. Villa outpaced Unity by such a degree that, six weeks after their close FA Cup tie, in the fourth round of the Birmingham Senior Cup, Villa beat Unity at the Aston Lower Grounds by 16 goals to 0. Ten of the goals were scored by Arthur Brown, who had left Unity for Villa earlier in the season, and had persuaded a number of team-mates to join him. Villa beat Wednesbury Old Athletic 3–2 in the final.

== FA Cup ==
This season also saw Villa's longest run in the FA Cup. They beat Walsall Swifts, Wednesbury Old Athletic, Aston Unity and Walsall Town before a controversial 4–3 loss to Notts County. The beaten Walsall Swifts would later merge with Walsall Town to make the present-day Walsall FC.

1st Round	Aston Villa	4–1	Walsall Swifts	Wellington Road
		Report
Note:

2nd Round	Aston Villa	4–1	Wednesbury Old Athletic	Wellington Road
		Report
Note:

3rd Round	Aston Villa	3–1	Aston Unity	Wellington Road
		Report
Note: In the 1882–83 season, Unity entered the FA Cup for the first time, and obtained a bye through the first round. The club beat "the coming club" St George's 3–1 in the second, at the Pickwick Cricket Ground, but lost to Villa in the third, at the latter's Wellington Road ground, in front of a crowd of 4–5,000.

4th Round	Aston Villa	2–1	Walsall Town	Wellington Road
		Report
Note:

5th Round	Notts County	4–3	Aston Villa
		Report
Note: A County player appeared to punch the ball off the line in the dying stages, but the referee was unmoved. Villa would have to wait until the 1891-92 season to see a penalty awarded in such circumstances.

The programme for the 1883 Birmingham Senior Cup final between Wednesbury Old Athletic and Villa

== Birmingham Senior Cup ==
Aston Villa beat Wednesbury Old Athletic 3–2 in the final.

== Staffordshire Cup ==
Viila played West Brom for the ever first time on 9 December 1882, in the second round of the Staffordshire Senior Cup: Villa hosted a 3–3 draw in front of 13,900 fans, while in the replay West Bromwich Albion won by a single goal with an attendance of 10,500. It is possible that this is the first recorded incident of football violence with Albion fans being pelted with soil from home supporters before scuffles broke out between the two sets of fans.
