= Billy Annis =

English footballer

Personal information
- Full name: William Annis
- Date of birth: 13 May 1874
- Place of birth: Darlaston, England
- Date of death: 1938 (aged 63–64)
- Place of death: Lincoln, England
- Position: Half-back

Senior career*
Years	Team	Apps	(Gls)
- Stafford Road
1898–1905	Wolverhampton Wanderers	138	(1)
- Cradley Heath
- * Club domestic league appearances and goals

William Annis (13 May 1874 – 1938) was an English footballer, who played in the Football League for Wolverhampton Wanderers.

== Career ==
Annis worked as a machinist before joining the club in August 1898 from Stafford Road (the town's railway works side), making his league debut on 14 March 1899 in a 2–0 win at Bury. He went on to make 147 appearances in total for Wolverhampton Wanderers, scoring one goal. In this period, Wolves' performance in the league was mediocre, but they did win the Birmingham Senior Cup twice during his stay at the club (in 1899 and 1901).

He sustained a knee injury and left the club in 1905 to join nearby Cradley Heath, later moving to Lincoln where he died in 1938.
