= Alf Harvey =

English footballer

Alfred Harvey (5 July 1856 – 26 February 1943) was an English footballer who made one appearance for England as a full back in 1881.

== Identity ==
Football historians have had difficulty identifying the precise name and details of A. Harvey who played for the Wednesbury Strollers and for England against Wales in the third international between the countries in February 1881. His first name (Alf or Alfred) was published in 1890, in 'Triumphs Of The Football Field' an autobiography by Aston Villa's captain Archie Hunter.

The main contenders were:

a 31-year-old shoemaker born in Stone, Staffordshire;
a 23-year-old coalminer born in Rugeley, Staffordshire;
a 21-year-old potter born in Stoke-on-Trent;
a 20-year-old apprentice saddler from Walsall;
a 19-year-old bricklayer born in Stoke-on-Trent;
a 32-year-old tinplate stamper born in Birmingham;
a 27-year-old tinplate worker born in Birmingham;
a 24-year-old gun barrel borer born in Birmingham.

Research undertaken by the author of Englandfootballonline has led him to conclude that the most likely candidate is Alf Harvey, a gun barrel borer born in Aston, Birmingham on 5 July 1856.

== Football career ==
He was registered with Wednesbury Strollers at the time of the international, and he later played representative football for Staffordshire. In his 1881 Football Annual, Charles Alcock described him as "a clever, hard-working back; dodges well."

He also played for Aston Villa, a fact confirmed by the Archie Hunter book: "Tom Bryan, who belonged to the Wednesbury Strollers . . . He had had for comrades at Wednesbury, Alfred Harvey and Eli Davis, who afterwards joined Villa". Later in same book: Alf Harvey played for Villa on 10 April 1883, and "Eli Davis and Alf Harvey, who were then the two finest left-wingers in the district".

From September 1883 to February 1884, he also played for Holte Villa and contemporary newspapers show him playing for Birmingham Excelsior from October 1886 to October 1888.

Harvey was selected to play for England against Wales on 26 February 1881 at Alexandra Meadows, Blackburn. The English selectors had picked an inexperienced team with seven players making their debuts. Harvey came in as a replacement for Edwin Luntley, and his error led to the only goal of the game. According to the Blackburn Standard of 5 March 1881, "Tis true Harvey ought to have returned the leather, but he missed his kick entirely". And the same day's edition of the Wrexham Advertiser refers to "Harvey clean missing his kick". England were "a little over-confident against the Welsh, who recorded their first victory on English soil with a 1–0 success".

== Family life ==
He married Margaret June Jenkins in Birmingham in April 1891 and died at Rugby on 26 February 1943 aged 86.
