= Shrewsbury F.C. =

Shrewsbury
- Full name: Shrewsbury Football Club
- Nickname: Salopians
- Founded: 1868
- Dissolved: c. 1880
- Ground: Racecourse Ground, Monkmoor, Shrewsbury
- Secretary: B. V. Randall, J. F. Cooper
| Original colours | 1878 colours |

Shrewsbury F.C. was a football club based in Shrewsbury, England.

== History ==
The club was formed in 1868 and its first match was on 22 January that year, a 3–2 defeat at a side from Whitchurch. The club seems to have gone into abeyance, as it was re-founded in 1875 with 30 members. By 1879 the club had 80 members.

The club's captain from 1876 to 1880 was John Hawley Edwards, who also played for Shropshire Wanderers and Wanderers. The club was an early member of the Birmingham Football Association and first came to prominence in 1877 by beating Stafford Road F.C., who had reached that season's Birmingham Senior Cup final, in a friendly.

The following season, the club won both the Birmingham Senior Cup and the Shropshire Senior Cup. Shrewsbury beat two Wednesbury clubs to win the Birmingham cup; Wednesbury Old Athletic in the semi-final and Wednesbury Strollers F.C. in the final, both by 2–1, the latter played at Aston Villa's Wellington Road ground in front of 5,000 spectators. Shrewsbury came from 1–0 down at half-time, the equalizer being scored from a Wace corner "cannoning off" Shrewsbury half-back A. T. Ward, and forward J. E. Sprott scoring the winner after Shrewsbury had struck the bar - an early use of the crossbar. The Strollers protested (unsuccessfully) that Wace was not a genuine resident of Shrewsbury.

In the Shropshire competition, the club beat the original Oswestry club 3–0 in a semi-final replay, Oswestry wearing black armbands after their player A. F. Jones had died in a match the previous Saturday, and beat Wellington Parish in the final, 1–0, thanks to a shot from distance from half-back W. H. Holt that passed just under the tape.

Despite the success, the club seems to have dissolved around 1880, as Edwards retired through injury, and other clubs in the region emerged. The club never defended its Birmingham Senior Cup crown, the town's representative for 1878–79 being the Shrewsbury Engineers club, who lost to the W.O.A.C. in the first round.

The club shared its shirt colours, ground, and a number of players with Shropshire Wanderers. The Wanderers entered the national competitions while the town club entered the local.

== Colours ==
The club's colours on re-founding were scarlet and royal blue jerseys, stockings, and cap, with white knickers, but by 1878 were all white.

== Ground ==
The club played at the Racecourse on Monkmoor Lane.

== Honours ==
- Birmingham Senior Cup
  - Winners (1): 1878
- Shropshire Senior Cup
  - Winners (1): 1878

== Notable players ==
- Henry Wace – 1877 and 1878 FA Cup winner with Wanderers and winner of three England caps
