= Dick Betteley =

English footballer

Personal information
- Full name: Richard Harold Betteley
- Date of birth: 14 July 1880
- Place of birth: Bradley, Staffordshire, England
- Date of death: 3 August 1942 (aged 62)
- Place of death: Wolverhampton, England
- Position: Defender

Senior career*
Years	Team	Apps	(Gls)
1900–1901	Bilston United		
1901–1906	Wolverhampton Wanderers	115	(1)
1906–1912	West Bromwich Albion	85	(0)
1912–1914	Bilston United		
- * Club domestic league appearances and goals

Richard Harold Betteley (14 July 1880 – 3 August 1942) was an English footballer who played for both Black Country clubs, Wolverhampton Wanderers and West Bromwich Albion.

Betteley turned professional in August 1901 when he joined First Division Wolverhampton Wanderers from nearby non-league side Bilston United. He made his Football League debut on 28 March 1902 in a 3–5 defeat at Notts County. He held his place in the team and missed just two games over the next two seasons, but found himself under pressure for his place in the 1905–06 campaign. He left for local rivals West Bromwich Albion at the season's end as Wolves dropped out of the top flight.

He made his Albion debut in September 1906 in a Second Division match away at Burnley. He won a Second Division championship medal with the club in 1910–11 campaign, but failed to make the team that played in the 1912 FA Cup Final. He left Albion in May 1912 to rejoin Bilston United, before retiring in May 1914.

He died in Wolverhampton on 3 August 1942.
