= 1883–84 Aston Villa F.C. season =

Aston Villa
1883–84 season
- Chairman: William McGregor
- FA Cup: 4th round

The 1883–84 English football season was Aston Villa's 5th season in Football Association Cup, the top-level football competition at the time. This season, after victories over Walsall Swifts, Stafford Road and Wednesbury Old Athletic (7–4), Villa were given their first FA Cup game that would mean having to travel outside the Midlands. They travelled to Glasgow to play Queen's Park. At the time, Scottish clubs regularly entered the 'English' FA Cup. After another large defeat 6–1, the Villa committee decided to change the playing style. At this time, before managers or coaches, committees picked the team. For the first time, Villa would now use two backs rather than one.

There were debuts for Archibald Vale, Tom Riddell and Robert Price.

Wednesbury Town reached the quarter-finals of the Birmingham Senior Cup in 1883–84, losing 5–3 to Aston Villa at the Aston Lower Grounds.

== FA Cup details ==
10 November 1883 1st Round	Walsall Swifts	1–5	Aston Villa
		Report
Note:

1 December 1883 2nd Round	Stafford Road	0–5	Aston Villa
		Report
Note:

29 December 1883 3rd Round	Wednesbury Old Athletic	4–7	Aston Villa
		Report
Note:

19 January 1884 4th Round	Queen's Park	6–1	Aston Villa
		Report

== Birmingham Charity Cup ==
Aston Villa beat Albion 4–1 in the semi-final of the Birmingham Charity Cup. This was the first time that Albion had participated in this competition.

Round	Date	Opponent	Venue	Result	WBA Goalscorer	Attendance
SF	5 April 1884	Aston Villa	A	1–4	Riddell (o.g.)	6,000

Source for match details:
