= Sid Corfield =

English footballer

Personal information
- Full name: Sidney Corfield
- Date of birth: 24 June 1883
- Place of birth: Tipton, Staffordshire, England
- Date of death: 1941 (aged 57–58)
- Position: Centre half

Senior career*
Years	Team	Apps	(Gls)
1900–1902	Toll End Wesley		
1902–1903	West Bromwich Albion	8	(0)
1905–1909	Wolverhampton Wanderers	44	(3)
1909–191x	Wrexham		
- Tipton Victoria
Total		52	(3)
- * Club domestic league appearances and goals

Sidney Corfield (24 June 1883 – 1941) was an English footballer who played in the Football League for both Black Country rivals, West Bromwich Albion and Wolverhampton Wanderers.

== Career ==
Corfield began his career with amateur side Toll End Wesley, before Football League side West Bromwich Albion in 1902. He made only eight first team appearances though, before quitting football at the request of his parents.

He returned to the game in 1905 when he signed for Wolverhampton Wanderers. He made his Wolves debut on 21 October 1905 in a 2–1 win against Blackburn Rovers. He made 29 appearances during this season which saw the club suffer relegation for the first time. After a further 18 appearances during the following campaign, he found himself out of first time contention.

He left Molineux to join Welsh League side Wrexham in 1909. He helped the club to two successive Welsh Cup triumphs before returning to the West Midlands with non-league Tipton Victoria. He retired from playing in 1915.
