= Wednesbury Strollers F.C. =

- Full name: Wednesbury Strollers Football Club
- Nicknames: the Kid Gloves, Dark Reds
- Founded: 1873
- Dissolved: 1885
- Ground: Trapezium Ground
Home colours

Wednesbury Strollers F.C. was an English football club based in Wednesbury, Staffordshire which was active in the 1870s and 1880s.

== History ==
The Wednesbury Football Club was formed in 1873 and originally played a form of Sheffield rules. The club was generally referred to as both Wednesbury and Wednesbury Town. From 1877 to 1885 the club was formally known as Wednesbury Strollers. The club was considered a more upmarket side than the Wednesbury Old Athletic Club (W.O.A.C.), with generally richer patrons but less public support.

=== FA Cup ===
The club entered the FA Cup during the four seasons from 1878–79 to 1881–1882, without any conspicuous success, in part thanks to the regional nature of the draw, which landed the amateur club with professional opponents on two occasions; however the club was the first from the West Midlands conurbation to enter the competition. The Strollers' FA Cup record was:

1878–79 – defeated in Round One by Oxford University 0–7, a match in which the team adopted shinguards, the first recorded instance of a team wearing them
1879–80 – defeated in Round One by Stafford Road 0–2
1880–81 – defeated in Round One by Aston Villa 3–5
1881–82 – victory in Round One over Stafford Road 3–1

defeated in Round Two by Notts County 1–11

The club's final tie, against Notts County, saw the match at the Castle Ground in Nottingham end 5–3 to County. The Strollers protested against one of County's goals, which the Strollers alleged went over the bar rather than under; after the match the Strollers registered a formal protest against two players as not being qualified to take part in the Cup, and at the lack of neutrality from the Nottingham-based referee. The Football Association ordered a re-play at a neutral ground, which was played at the County Cricket Ground in Derby. The fitter professional side ran up eleven goals.

=== Birmingham Senior Cup ===
The club had more success in the Birmingham Senior Cup, reaching the semi-final in the competition's first year of 1876–77, and the final in 1877–78; the club changed its name between the quarter-final and the semi-final in the latter year from Town to Strollers. A measure of the difference between the Strollers and the W.O.A.C. is the latter's semi-final at home to Shrewsbury was watched by 6,000, while the Strollers only attracted 200.

In the final, played at Aston Villa's Wellington Road ground in front of 5,000 spectators, Shrewsbury came from 1–0 down at half-time, the equalizer being scored from a Wace corner "cannoning off" Shrewsbury half-back A. T. Ward, and forward J. E. Sprott scoring the winner after Shrewsbury had struck the bar - an early use of the crossbar. The Strollers protested (unsuccessfully) that Wace was not a genuine resident of Shrewsbury.

The club reached the last six in 1879-80 and the last eight in 1882–83, both times losing heavily to the professional Walsall Swifts F.C. The club's final competitive match was against the second Wednesbury Town club, in the Birmingham Senior Cup, in 1884–85; the new Town won 5–0. There are no records for the club after the season's end.

== Colours ==
The club's colours were originally orange and black. By 1876 they had changed to maroon and white, which remained the club's colours until its dissolution.

== Grounds ==
Strollers originally played at Crankhall Farm, and by 1877 the club had moved to Wood Green. The club also used the Trapezium Ground in Wednesbury for its bigger matches.

== Famous players ==
- George Woodhall, later FA Cup winner with West Bromwich Albion
- Alf Harvey, capped for England while with the Strollers
- Howard Vaughton, Tom Bryan, and Eli Davis, later joined Aston Villa
