= Wally Roberts =

Welsh footballer

Personal information
- Full name: Walter Roberts
- Date of birth: 23 November 1917
- Place of birth: Wrexham, Wales
- Date of death: 2006 (aged 88–89)
- Position: Wing-half

Senior career*
Years	Team	Apps	(Gls)
1938–1948	Wrexham	60	(1)
1948–1950	Bournemouth & Boscombe Athletic	15	(0)
- Ellesmere Port Town
- * Club domestic league appearances and goals

Walter Roberts (23 November 1917 – March 2006) was a Welsh footballer who played as a wing-half. He made appearances in the English football league for Wrexham and Bournemouth & Boscombe Athletic.
