= Edwin Luntley =

English footballer

Personal information
- Date of birth: 28 April 1857
- Place of birth: Croydon, England
- Date of death: 1 August 1921 (aged 64)
- Position: Right back

Senior career*
Years	Team	Apps	(Gls)
- Nottingham Forest

International career
1880	England	2	(0)
- * Club domestic league appearances and goals

Edwin Luntley (28 April 1857 – 1 August 1921) was an English international footballer, who played as a right back.

== Career ==
Born in Croydon, Luntley played for Nottingham Forest from November 1878 to January 1883. He earned two caps for England in 1880.
