= Dickie Baugh Jr. =

English footballer

Personal information
- Full name: Richard Baugh
- Date of birth: 6 March 1896
- Place of birth: Wolverhampton, England
- Date of death: 3 August 1972 (aged 76)
- Place of death: Wolverhampton, England
- Position: Defender

Senior career*
Years	Team	Apps	(Gls)
- Stafford Road
1918–1924	Wolverhampton Wanderers	108	(4)
1924–1929	West Bromwich Albion		
1929–1932	Exeter City		
1932–1936	Kidderminster Harriers		
- * Club domestic league appearances and goals

Richard Baugh Jr. (6 March 1896 – 3 August 1972) was an English footballer who played for both Black Country clubs, Wolverhampton Wanderers and West Bromwich Albion. He was the son of Dickie Baugh who also represented the former.

Baugh began his career with the Wolverhampton-based Stafford Road before joining Wolves in August 1918. With league football suspended due to World War I until the following year, he had to wait until 18 October 1919 to make his debut, in a 0–1 defeat to Bury.

He battled for his spot in defence with Jackery Jones over his first seasons, but played every round of the club's route to the 1921 FA Cup Final. However, Baugh was injured in the weeks leading up to the game and missed their defeat to Tottenham Hotspur. With Jones having retired at the end of the season, Baugh made the spot his own and was a near ever-present over the next season and-a-half until suffering injury.

Baugh remained on the club's books until June 1924 when he moved to their rivals West Bromwich Albion after making 120 appearances in total for Wolves. He made his Albion debut in February 1925 in a First Division match against Preston North End. In May 1929 he joined Exeter City, before a transfer to Kidderminster Harriers in January 1932. He remained with Kidderminster until his retirement from football in April 1936.

He died in 1972.
