= Clement Keys =

English football manager and secretary

Clement Keys (1864 – 22 November 1937) was an English football secretary-manager for West Bromwich Albion from 1895 to 1896.

He was born in Derby, Derbyshire, and played amateur football for Albion as a goalie. He later became a chartered accountant, founding the firm Clement Keys & Sons. He was borough accountant for West Bromwich. He was also active as a Freemason; he was Master of the Dartmouth Lodge and Sandwell Lodge of Freemasons and was Assistant Standard-bearer of the United Grand Lodge of England. He died in Birmingham, aged 73.
