= Bruce Baugh (philosopher) =

Canadian philosopher

Education
- Education: University of Toronto (PhD), University of British Columbia (BA, MA)

Philosophical work
- Era: 21st-century philosophy
- Region: Western philosophy
- School: Continental
- Institutions: Thompson Rivers University
- Main interests: French existentialism, Marxism and Surrealism, especially Benjamin Fondane, Walking

Bruce Baugh is a Canadian philosopher and Professor Emeritus of Philosophy at Thompson Rivers University. He is known for his work on Hegel's reception in France.

== Books ==
- French Hegel: From Surrealism to Postmodernism (New York and London: Routledge, 2003)
- Existential Monday: Philosophical Essays, by Benjamin Fondane. Edited and translated by Bruce Baugh (New York: NYRB Classics, 2016)
- Philosophers' Walks (Routledge, 2021)
