= Stafford Road F.C. =

Stafford Road
- Full name: Stafford Road Railway Works Football Club
- Nickname: The Roadsters
- Founded: 1874
- Dissolved: 1925?
- Ground: Recreation Ground, Stafford Road railway works, Wolverhampton
- Capacity: n/a
Home colours

Stafford Road F.C. was an English association football club founded in 1874, which is now defunct. The club was connected to the Stafford Road railway works in Wolverhampton, then-Staffordshire.

== History ==
The club was founded by the works manager Charles Crump and was noted as the strongest team in Wolverhampton until the formation of Wolverhampton Wanderers in 1877. In its earliest matches, the club was sometimes referred to as Stafford Road Works.

The club gave its foundation date as 1874, originally as a bandy club, although it does not seem to have played any matches against any other side until after it became a founder member of the Birmingham Football Association, the first match being against the Wednesbury Old Athletic. The playing make-up of the club was primarily railway officials from the Great Western Railway works based at the Stafford Road depot, which by 1878 meant it had a pool of 75 players from which to choose.

=== Early years: local competitions ===
In 1876–77, the club played in the first Birmingham Senior Cup, and reached the final, against Wednesbury Old Athletic F.C., played at Calthorpe F.C.'s ground on the Bristol Road in Birmingham. A special train left Wolverhampton at 2.05pm, calling at Wednesbury, West Bromwich, and Hockley, to allow the team members and their friends to travel to the final.

The Roadsters took a two-goal lead in the first half-an-hour of the match, both scored by Crump, but Page shot just under the bar for a goal back shortly before half-time. Holmes scored two quick goals in the second half, which were enough to secure the trophy for the Old Uns.

One of the early matches for the club's second team was an 8–0 away win in 1877 against the St Luke's side, which, after a later merger, became Wolverhampton Wanderers. In 1878–79 the club reached the Birmingham Senior Cup final for a second time, at Aston Villa's ground at Perry Barr, losing again to the W.O.A.C., again by 3–2. The result this time was controversial. The match ended 2–2 after 90 minutes, and the captains agreed to play 20 minutes' extra time to try to resolve the match, despote the Roadsters effectively being down to ten men through injury. Straight after the kick-off, both sides claimed a throw-in, and while the umpires were referring the decision to the referee, the W.O.A.C. took the throw, and Holmes put the ball through the Roadsters' goal, goalkeeper Edward "Tom" Ray making no attempt to save it. The referee decided that the throw-in was properly taken and therefore awarded the goal. Stafford Road put in a protest which was dismissed.

In 1879–80, the club earned its greatest honour, in the inaugural Wednesbury Charity Cup, at the time a prestigious tournament in which the leading clubs of the region were invited to participate. The club beat Derby Town and the Old Athletic to reach the final, which took place at the Old Uns' ground on 31 May; the Roadsters beat the Wednesbury side Elwells 3–0. The following season the Roadsters beat Calthorpe 11–0 in the first round en route to the final, where the Old Uns gained revenge in front of an "immense" crowd.

=== FA Cup last six ===
The 1879–80 English football season saw the club enter the national stage for the first time, by taking part in the FA Cup. Just like Stafford it was opponent, Aston Villa's first ever FA Cup tie and the start of their official record. The match was played on Saturday 13 December 1879 before a crowd of 2,000 at Stafford's Half-Way House Ground. The club was eliminated by Aston Villa in a replay, despite recruiting two players from Shrewsbury.

The club's best run in the competition came the following season, starting with an easy 7–0 win over Spilsby; the match had to be played at Trent Bridge as Spilsby's ground was flooded. However, as Notts County were playing a prestigious friendly against Queen's Park at the Castle Ground at the same time, the attendance was about a dozen. The Roadsters also scored 7 in a second round replay against Grantham in front of a "poor show" of spectators. After a bye, the club ended Aston Villa's run of 17 consecutive victories by winning 3–2 at Perry Barr, to considerable surprise as Villa "were highly fancied by the critics to win [the Cup] straight out"; Crump scored one for the Roadsters and Robert Gowland, a railway clerk who had been with the club since its earliest matches, and who had been working at the Stafford Road works since he was 13, the other two. Near the end of the match, Villa claimed a goal after goalkeeper Ray slipped when trying to make a save and deflected the ball away with his foot; play was stopped to allow the referee to inspect the pitch, and, finding one of Ray's footprints on the right side of the goal-line where the shot was stopped, declared there to be no goal. The run ended in the fifth round (the final 6), the club unable to recover a two-goal half-time deficit against the Old Etonians.

=== Post-professionalism decline ===
Gradually, association football had been adopting professionalism by the back door; in particular, Aston Villa and West Bromwich Albion had been recruiting professional players and paying them via arranged employment, and Mitchell St George's would soon follow in so doing. Already, by the 1883–84 season, the Roadsters were being described as "once famous" as Charles Crump, as President of the Birmingham Football Association and vice-president of the Football Association, as well as secretary of the club, was firmly opposed to any moves towards professionalism, keeping the club solely as a works outfit.

At an FA meeting in January 1885, Crump led the opposition to professionalism, even though William Sudell of Preston North End alleged that the Birmingham FA representative side included "amateurs" who had played in Lancashire as professionals.

In July 1885, professionalism was fully legalised, by which time Crump had dropped his opposition to it, but Stafford Road remained resolutely amateur, a club solely for railway employees. The result was that the club was rapidly eclipsed by other Midlands teams adopting professionalism, especially Wolverhampton Wanderers, whose early adoption of professionalism meant that those players who wanted to turn professional switched to the Wanderers.

The club entered the FA Cup for the last time in 1887–88, originally beating Great Bridge Unity in the first round, but the Football Association ordered a replay as only seven of the Stafford Road players were eligible for the tournament. Rather than replay the tie, the Roadsters scratched, and played a friendly against the Unity on the due date (which ended 1–1). Qualifying rounds were introduced in 1888–89 and the club did not enter the Cup again.

The date of the club's dissolution is unclear, but, as a side playing purely works football, it is known to have survived into the early 1920s. The railway works that the football club were associated with closed in 1964.

== Colours ==
The earliest recorded colours of the club were described as "the Queen's Park jersey" of narrow black and white hoops, which the club wore in 1876–77. The next season the club gave its colours as blue and white, probably again in hoops. For 1878–79 and 1879–80 the club wore white, and for 1880–81 and 1881–82 reverted to white and black.

== Ground ==
The club played on the Stafford Road works premises.

== Honours ==
Birmingham Senior Cup:

- Runners-up: 1876–77, 1878–79

Wednesbury Charity Cup:

- Winners: 1879–80
- Runners-up: 1880–81

Walsall Cup

- Runners-up: 1883–84

== FA Cup results ==
1879–80 – Rd 1 Wednesbury Strollers (H) won 2–0, Rd 2 Aston Villa (H) drew 1–1, replay Aston Villa (A) lost 1–3

1880–81 – Rd 1 Spilsby (H) won 7–0, Rd 2 Grantham (A) drew 1–1, replay Grantham (H) won 7–1, Rd 3 Bye, Rd 4 Aston Villa (A) won 3–2, Rd 5 Old Etonians (H) lost 1–2

1881–82 – Rd 1 Wednesbury Strollers (A) lost 1–3

1882–83 – Rd 1 Small Heath Alliance (A) drew 3–3, replay Small Heath Alliance (H) won 6–2, Rd 2 Walsall Town (A) lost 1–4

1883–84 – Rd 1 Aston Unity (H) won 5–1, Rd 2 Aston Villa (H) lost 0–5

1884–85 – Rd 1 Walsall Swifts (A) drew 0–0, replay Walsall Swifts (H) lost 0–2

1885–86 – Rd 1 Matlock (H) won 7–0, Rd 2 Wolverhampton Wanderers (A) lost 2–4

1886–87 – did not compete

1887–88 – Rd 1 Great Bridge Unity (H) won 2–1 (replay ordered after protest), withdrew.

== Notable players ==
The club produced an England international in Dickie Baugh, who became Stafford Road's only ever international when he played in a 6–1 win against Ireland on 13 March 1886. Baugh later joined the town's professional side Wolverhampton Wanderers, as did several other notable Stafford Road players including his son Dickie Baugh (junior) and Billy Annis.
