= Dickie Baugh =

English footballer (1864–1929)

Personal information
- Full name: Richard Baugh
- Date of birth: 14 February 1864
- Place of birth: Staveley, Derbyshire, England
- Date of death: 14 August 1929 (aged 65)
- Place of death: Moseley Village, Wolverhampton, England
- Position: Right back

Youth career
- Rose Villa
- Wolverhampton Rangers

Senior career*
Years	Team	Apps	(Gls)
1884–1886	Stafford Road		
1886–1896	Wolverhampton Wanderers	185	(1)
1896–1897	Walsall	6	

International career
1886–1890	England	2	(0)
- * Club domestic league appearances and goals

Richard Baugh (14 February 1864 – 14 August 1929) was an English footballer who spent the majority of his career with Wolverhampton Wanderers, for whom he played in three FA Cup finals (one as captain).

Dick Baugh was a teak–tough full–back, quick off the mark with a timely tackle who could kick long and true. Baugh attended St. Luke's School, Blakenhall and played for Rose Villa, Wolverhampton Rangers and then began his senior career with the Wolverhampton-based Stafford Road. During his time here, he earned a call-up to the England team - the club's only player to achieve this honour - making his international debut on 13 March 1886 in a 6–1 win over Ireland. The defender joined Wolves just weeks later (May 1886), and made his club debut on 30 October 1886 in a 6–0 FA Cup thumping of Matlock.

Dick Baugh made his League debut on 8 September 1888, as a full–back for Wolverhampton Wanderers in a 1–1 draw against Aston Villa at Dudley Road, the then home of Wolverhampton Wanderers. Dick Baugh appeared in all of the Wolverhampton Wanderers 22 Football League matches in season 1888–89 and was part of a defence-line that kept four clean–sheets and restricted the opposition to one–League–goal–in–a–match on eight separate occasions. Dick Baugh and Harry Allen were the only Wolverhampton Wanderers players to appear in every League match in season 1888–89. Played in that season's FA Cup Final losing 3–0 to League Champions, Preston North End.

He appeared in two further FA Cup finals with the club - in 1893 he was on the winning side in a 1–0 triumph over Everton, while in 1896 he was captain as they went down 2–1 to Wednesday.

After playing over 220 senior games for Wolves, he moved to Walsall in 1896. He played just one further season before retiring due to a knee injury.

His son Dickie Baugh Jr. later also played for Wolves.
