= Birmingham Senior Cup =

- Organiser(s): Birmingham County FA
- Founded: 1876; 150 years ago
- Region: West Midlands
- Teams: 35 (2023–24)
- Current champions: Tamworth (5th title)
- Most championships: Aston Villa (20 titles)
- Website: Birmingham Senior Cup

The Birmingham Senior Cup is a regional football competition for Birmingham County FA club teams, organised by the Birmingham County Football Association. It began in 1876 and is the oldest county cup competition still active and the third oldest in the world overall.

The Birmingham Senior Cup is a regional cup contest, which has featured all of the West Midlands' big clubs, Aston Villa, Birmingham City, Burton Albion, Coventry City, Port Vale, Stoke City, West Bromwich Albion, Walsall and Wolverhampton Wanderers.

In recent years many of region's higher division clubs have tended to treat the cup as a reserve or academy/youth team competition, giving non-league sides a greater chance of success, while the competition's most successful team, Aston Villa, did not compete at all for several years, before returning for the 2018-19 competition. In the 2016–17 season, Leamington became the first team to win the cup in a penalty shootout, defeating Wolverhampton Wanderers.

== Past finals ==
The programme for the 1883 final between Wednesbury Old Athletic and Aston Villa

=== Key ===
Match went to a replay
Match went to extra time
Match decided by a penalty shootout after extra time
Shared trophy

Season	Winners	Result	Runner-up	Notes
1876-77	Wednesbury Old Athletic	3–2	Stafford Road	
1877-78	Shrewsbury (Note: Shrewsbury FC is not the same club as Shrewsbury Town FC)	2–1	Wednesbury Strollers	
1878-79	Wednesbury Old Athletic	3–2	Stafford Road	After extra time.
1879–80	Aston Villa	3–1	Saltley College	
1880–81	Walsall Swifts	1–0	Aston Villa	
1881–82	Aston Villa	2–1	Wednesbury Old Athletic	
1882–83	Aston Villa	3–2	Wednesbury Old Athletic	
1883–84	Aston Villa	4–0	Walsall Swifts	
1884–85	Aston Villa	2–0	Walsall Swifts	
1885–86	West Bromwich Albion	1–0	Walsall Swifts	Replay. First match ended 0–0.
1886–87	Long Eaton Rangers	1–0	West Bromwich Albion	
1887–88	Aston Villa	3–2	West Bromwich Albion	
1888–89	Aston Villa	2–0	Wolverhampton Wanderers	
1889–90	Aston Villa	2–0	West Bromwich Albion	
1890–91	Aston Villa	3–0	Wednesbury Old Athletic	
1891–92	Wolverhampton Wanderers	5–2	West Bromwich Albion	
1892–93	Wolverhampton Wanderers	3–1	Aston Villa	
1893–94	Wolverhampton Wanderers; West Bromwich Albion	3–3		Trophy shared.
1894–95	West Bromwich Albion	1–0	Aston Villa	Replay. First match ended 0–0.
1895–96	Aston Villa	3–0	Sheffield United	
1896–97	Walsall	2–1	Wolverhampton Wanderers	
1897–98	Walsall	3–0	Wolverhampton Wanderers	
1898–99	Aston Villa	4–0	Burslem Port Vale	
1899–1900	Wolverhampton Wanderers	2–1	Burslem Port Vale	Replay. First match ended 1–1.
1900–01	Stoke	4–3	Aston Villa	Replay. First match ended 1–1.
1901–02	Wolverhampton Wanderers	1–0	Aston Villa	
1902–03	Aston Villa	3–0	West Bromwich Albion	
1903–04	Aston Villa	3–1	Wolverhampton Wanderers	
1904–05	Small Heath	7–2	West Bromwich Albion	
1905–06	Aston Villa	3–1	Birmingham	
1906–07	Birmingham	5–3	Wolverhampton Wanderers	
1907–08	Aston Villa	6–0	Walsall	
1908–09	Aston Villa	2–1	Wolverhampton Wanderers	
1909–10	Aston Villa	2–1	Stoke	
1910–11	Coventry City	1–0	Stourbridge	
1911–12	Aston Villa	2–1	Willenhall Pickwick	
1912–13	Port Vale	1–0	Wolverhampton Wanderers	Replay. First match ended 0–0.
1913–14	Stoke	2–1	Port Vale	Replay. First match ended 0–0.
1914–15	Birmingham	2–0	Stoke	
1915–19	No competition due to World War I.			
1919–20	Birmingham	3–0	Stoke	
1920–21	Birmingham	5–1	Stoke	
1921–22	Birmingham	2–1	Wellington	
1922–23	Coventry City	2–1	Bilston United	
1923–24	Wolverhampton Wanderers	2–1	Aston Villa	
1924–25	Redditch	1–0	Cradley Heath	
1925–26	Burton Town	3–0	Wellington Town	
1926–27	Cradley Heath	1–0	Burton Town	Replay. First match ended 3–3.
1927–28	Burton Town	3–2	Hereford United	
1928–29	Burton Town	2–0	Hereford United	Replay. First match ended 0–0.
1929–30	Oakengates Town	3–1	Kidderminster Harriers	
1930–31	Nuneaton Town	4–2	Evesham Town	Replay. First match ended 1–1.
1931–32	Redditch	3–2	Brierley Hill	
1932–33	Brierley Hill	3–2	Redditch	
1933–34	Kidderminster Harriers	2–1	Burton Town	
1934–35	Kidderminster Harriers	5–2	Nuneaton	
1935–36	Hednesford Town	2–1	Burton Town	
1936–37	Brierley Hill	5–2	Tamworth	
1937–38	Kidderminster Harriers	2–1	Burton Town	Replay. First match ended 1–1.
1938–39	Redditch	1–0	Darlaston	
1939–40	Solihull Town	2–1	Darlaston	
1940–45	No competition due to World War II.			
1945–46	Kidderminster Harriers	5–0	Stourbridge	
1946–47	Wellington Town	2–1	Bromsgrove Rovers	
1947–48	Atherstone Town	2–0	Bromsgrove Rovers	
1948–49	Nuneaton Borough	2–1	Banbury Spencer	
1949–50	Stourbridge	2–1	Bedworth Town	Replay. First match ended 1–1.
1950–51	Lockheed (Leamington)	3–1	Hereford United	Replay. First match ended 2–2.
1951–52	Brierley Hill	2–1	Halesowen Town	
1952–53	Brierley Hill	2–1	Nuneaton Borough	
1953–54	Burton Albion	2–1	Brierley Hill	
1954–55	Brush Sports; Hinckley Athletic	1–1		Replay. First match ended 0–0. Trophy shared. After extra time.
1955–56	Nuneaton Borough	2–0	Brush Sports	
1956–57	Lockheed (Leamington)	2–0	Redditch	
1957–58	Moor Green	1–0	Lockheed (Leamington)	
1958–59	Stourbridge	2–1	Lockheed (Leamington)	
1959–60	Nuneaton Borough	1–0	Banbury Spencer	
1960–61	Tamworth	3–1	Rugby Town	
1961–62	Lockheed (Leamington)	5–1	Rugby Town	
1962–63	Stratford Town	2–1	Lockheed (Leamington)	
1963–64	Kidderminster Harriers	3–2	Tamworth	
1964–65	Kidderminster Harriers	3–1	Dudley Town	
1965–66	Tamworth	3–1	Kidderminster Harriers	
1966–67	Kidderminster Harriers	6–3	Nuneaton Borough	Aggregate score over two legs.
1967–68	Stourbridge	4–3	Halesowen Town	Aggregate score over two legs.
1968–69	Tamworth	6–3	Bilston	Aggregate score over two legs.
1969–70	Lockheed (Leamington)	3–0	Burton Albion	Aggregate score over two legs.
1970–71	Rugby Town	2–0	Burton Albion	Aggregate score over two legs.
1971–72	Lockheed (Leamington)	1–0	Highgate United	Aggregate score over two legs.
1972–73	Darlaston	2–1	Lockheed (Leamington)	
1973–74	Highgate United	3–2	Darlaston	
1974–75	Atherstone Town	1–0	AP Leamington	
1975–76	Worcester City	1–0	Stourbridge	
1976–77	Redditch United	3–0	Atherstone Town	
1977–78	Nuneaton Borough	1–0	Redditch United	Replay. First match ended 1–1.
1978–79	Bedworth United	2–0	AP Leamington	Replay. First match ended 1–1. After extra time.
1979–80	Nuneaton Borough	2–0	Lye Town	
1980–81	Bedworth United	2–0	Alvechurch	
1981–82	Bedworth United	4–2	Alvechurch	
1982–83	Birmingham City	1–0	Aston Villa	
1983–84	Halesowen Town	1–0	Dudley Town	
1984–85	Aston Villa	3–1	Wednesfield Social	
1985–86	Dudley Town	4–2	Willenhall Town	
1986–87	Wolverhampton Wanderers	2–1	Burton Albion	Replay. First match ended 2–2. After extra time.
1987–88	West Bromwich Albion	3–1	Bedworth United	
1988–89	VS Rugby	1–0	Bromsgrove Rovers	
1989–90	West Bromwich Albion	2–0	Atherstone United	
1990–91	West Bromwich Albion	2–0	Nuneaton Borough	
1991–92	VS Rugby	3–0	Birmingham City	
1992–93	Nuneaton Borough	2–0	VS Rugby	
1993–94	Walsall	3–0	Hednesford Town	
1994–95	Solihull Borough	2–0	Aston Villa	
1995–96	Birmingham City	2–0	Aston Villa	
1996–97	Burton Albion	3–1	Tamworth	
1997–98	Halesowen Town	3–1	Redditch United	
1998–99	Birmingham City	4–1	Wolverhampton Wanderers	
1999–2000	Birmingham City	1–0	Walsall	
2000–01	Moor Green	3–1	Tamworth	
2001–02	Nuneaton Borough	2–0	West Bromwich Albion	
2002–03	Birmingham City	2–0	Moor Green	
2003–04	Moor Green	1–0	Wolverhampton Wanderers	
2004–05	Redditch United	3–2	Birmingham City	
2005–06	Willenhall Town	1–0	Stourbridge	
2006–07	Coventry City	3–2	Walsall	
2007–08	Birmingham City	5–0	Burton Albion	
2008–09	Hednesford Town	2–0	Stourbridge	
2009–10	Nuneaton Town	2–1	Alvechurch	
2010–11	Sutton Coldfield Town	1–0	Nuneaton Town	
2011–12	West Bromwich Albion	2–0	Solihull Moors	
2012–13	Hednesford Town	4–1	Sutton Coldfield Town	
2013–14	West Bromwich Albion	2–1	Tamworth	
2014–15	Birmingham City	2–1	Nuneaton Town	
2015–16	Solihull Moors	2–1	Birmingham City	
2016–17	Leamington	1–1	Wolverhampton Wanderers	Leamington won 5–4 on penalties. After extra time.
2017–18	Stourbridge	2–1	Hednesford Town	
2018–19	Leamington	4–1	Nuneaton Borough	
2019–20	Competition abandoned due to COVID-19 pandemic.			
2020–21	No competition due to COVID-19 pandemic.			
2021–22	Leamington	3–1	Stourbridge	
2022–23	Stourbridge	0–0	Coventry City	Stourbridge won 4–2 on penalties. After extra time.
2023–24	Aston Villa	9–0	Racing Club Warwick	
2024–25	Tamworth	4–1	Burton Albion	
2025–26	Tamworth	2–1	Leamington	

=== Wins by teams ===
Club	Wins	First final win	Last final win	Runner-up	Last final lost	Total final apps.	Notes
Aston Villa	20	1879–80	2023–24	9	1995–96	29	
Birmingham City	13	1904–05	2014–15	4	2015–16	17	(Note: Won 1 title as Small Heath & 5 titles as Birmingham.)
Nuneaton Town	9	1930–31	2009–10	7	2018–19	16	(Note: Won 7 titles as Nuneaton Borough.)
West Bromwich Albion	8	1893–94	2013–14	7	2001–02	15	(Note: Shared 1 trophy with Wolverhampton Wanderers (1893–94).)
Leamington	8	1950–51	2021–22	7	2025-26	15	(Note: Won 5 titles as Lockheed Lemington.)
Wolverhampton Wanderers	7	1891–92	1986–87	10	2016–17	17	(Note: Shared 1 trophy with West Bromwich Albion (1893–94).)
Kidderminster Harriers	7	1933–34	1966–67	2	1965–66	9	
Stourbridge	5	1949–50	2022–23	6	2021–22	11	
Redditch United	5	1924–25	2004–05	4	1997–98	9	(Note: Won 4 titles as Redditch.)
Tamworth	5	1960–61	2025-26	5	2013–14	10	
Walsall	4	1880–81	1993–94	6	2006–07	10	(Note: Won 1 titles as Walsall Swifts.)
Brierley Hill †	4	1932–33	1952–53	2	1953–54	6	(Note: Dissolved in 1981.)
Burton Town †	3	1925–26	1928–29	4	1937–38	7	(Note: Dissolved in 1950. Merged into Burton Albion.)
Rugby Town	3	1970–71	1991–92	3	1992–93	3	(Note: Won 2 titles as VS Rugby.)
Hednesford Town	3	1935–36	2012–13	2	2017–18	5	
Bedworth United	3	1978–79	1981–82	1	1987–88	4	
Coventry City	3	1910–11	2006–07	1	2022–23	4	
Moor Green †	3	1957–58	2003–04	1	2002–03	4	(Note: Dissolved in 2007. Merged with Solihull Borough to form Solihull Moors.)
Burton Albion	2	1953–54	1996–97	5	2024–25	7	
Stoke City	2	1900–01	1913–14	4	1920–21	6	(Note: Won 2 titles as Stoke.)
Wednesbury Old Athletic †	2	1876-77	1878–79	3	1890–91	5	(Note: Dissolved in 1893.)
Halesowen Town	2	1983–84	1997–98	2	1967–68	4	
Atherstone Town	2	1947–48	1974–75	1	1976–77	3	
Darlaston Town †	1	1972–73	1972–73	3	1973–74	4	(Note: Dissolved in 1874. Won 2 titles as Darlaston.)
Port Vale	1	1912–13	1912–13	3	1913–14	4	
Dudley Town	1	1985–86	1985–86	2	1983–84	3	
Brush Sports †	1	1954–55	1954–55	1	1955–56	2	(Note: Dissolved in 1960. Shared 1 trophy with Hinckley Athletic (1954–55).)
Cradley Heath †	1	1926–27	1926–27	1	1924–25	2	(Note: Dissolved in 1971.)
Highgate United	1	1973–74	1973–74	1	1971–72	2	
Solihull Moors	1	2015–16	2015–16	1	2011–12	2	
Sutton Coldfield Town	1	2010–11	2010–11	1	2012–13	2	
Wellington Town †	1	1946–47	1946–47	1	1925–26	2	(Note: Dissolved in 2004.)
Willenhall Town	1	2005–06	2005–06	1	1985–86	2	
Hinckley Athletic †	1	1954–55	1054–55	0	–	1	(Note: Dissolved in 1997. Merged with Hinckley Town to form Hinckley United. Shared 1 trophy with Brush Sports (1954–55).)
Long Eaton Rangers †	1	1886–87	1886–87	0	–	1	(Note: Dissolved in 1899.)
Oakengates Town †	1	1929–30	1929–30	0	–	1	(Note: Dissolved in 2018.)
Shrewsbury †	1	1877–78	1877–78	0	–	1	(Note: Dissolved in 1880.)
Solihull Borough	1	1994–95	1994–95	0	–	1	(Note: Dissolved in 2007. Merged with Moor Green to form Solihull Moors.)
Solihull Town †	1	1939–40	1939–40	0	–	1	(Note: Dissolved in 1944.)
Stratford Town	1	1962–63	1962–63	0	–	1	
Worcester City	1	1975–76	1975–76	0	–	1	

== Records ==
=== Final appearances and wins ===
- Record number of wins: 20
  - Aston Villa
- Most consecutive wins: 4
  - Aston Villa (1881–82, 1882–83, 1883–84, 1884–85)
  - Aston Villa (1887–88, 1888–89, 1889–90, 1890–91)
  - Birmingham City (Note: No competition was held between 1915 and 1919. Birmingham City entered 1919–20 season as defending champions.) (1914–15, 1919–20, 1920–21, 1921–22)
- Most consecutive lost: 3
  - Walsall (1883–84, 1884–85, 1885–86)
  - Stoke City (1914–15, 1919–20, 1920–21)
- Most finals played without winning: 3
  - Alvechurch (1980–81, 1981–82, 2009–10)
  - Bromsgrove Rovers (1946–47, 1947–48, 1988–89)
  - Hereford United (1927–28, 1928–29, 1950–51)
- Record number of final appearances: 29
  - Aston Villa
- Five or more wins by club:
  - 20 Aston Villa
  - 13 Birmingham City (1 as Small Heath)
  - 9 Nuneaton Town (7 as Nuneaton Borough)
  - 8 Leamington (5 as Lockheed Leamington)
  - 7 Wolverhampton Wanderers
  - 7 West Bromwich Albion
  - 7 Kidderminster Harriers
  - 5 Tamworth
  - 5 Stourbridge
  - 5 Redditch United

=== Scoring ===
- Highest scoring finals: 9 goals
  - Aston Villa 9–0 Racing Club Warwick (2023–24)
  - Small Heath 7–2 West Bromwich Albion (1904–05)
  - Kidderminster Harriers 6–3 Nuneaton Borough (1966–67)
  - Tamworth 6–3 Bilston Town (1968–69)
- Most final matches without conceding: 10
  - Aston Villa (1883–84, 1884–85, 1888–89, 1889–90, 1890–91, 1895–96, 1898–99, 1902–03, 1907–08, 2023–24)
