= 1892–93 Small Heath F.C. season =

Small Heath F.C.
1892–93 season
- Chairman: Walter W. Hart
- Secretary: Alfred Jones
- Ground: Coventry Road
- Football League Second Division: 1st
- FA Cup: First round proper (eliminated by Burnley)
- Birmingham Senior Cup: Semi-final (eliminated by Aston Villa)
- Birmingham Charity Cup: Runners-up (eliminated by Aston Villa)
- Top goalscorer: League: Fred Wheldon (25); All: Fred Wheldon (26)
- Highest home attendance: 3,000 vs Burton Swifts (12 November 1892)
- Lowest home attendance: 1,000 vs Ardwick (1 April 1893)
Home colours

The 1892–93 English football season was Small Heath F.C.'s 12th season of competitive association football. After finishing in third position in the Football Alliance in 1891–92, Small Heath, based in Birmingham, was one of 12 clubs elected to the newly formed Second Division for the 1892–93 Football League season.

During the season, the team scored 90 goals at an average of four goals per game, beat Walsall Town Swifts 12–0 to set a club record League victory which still stands, remained undefeated on their own ground throughout the season, and won the last nine matches of the League season to take the Second Division title at their first attempt. Promotion to the First Division was not automatic, even for the champions, but depended on the results of test matches between the top three Second Division and bottom three First Division teams. Small Heath lost to Newton Heath, the 16th-placed First Division team, after a replay, so were not promoted, although the teams placed second and third were.

Small Heath entered the 1892–93 FA Cup at the first round proper, and lost in that round to First Division club Burnley. In local competitions, they were eliminated by Aston Villa in the semi-final of the Birmingham Senior Cup and the final of the Mayor of Birmingham's Charity Cup. Small Heath also played several friendly matches during the season, including benefit matches for players Harry Morris, Caesar Jenkyns and Fred Speller.

Small Heath used 19 different players in nationally organised competitive matches during the season and had ten different goalscorers. Three players, Fred Wheldon, Tommy Hands and Billy Ollis, appeared in every League match. The top scorer was inside-forward Wheldon with 25 League goals, a total which made him the Second Division's leading scorer, and the other four first-choice forwards all reached double figures. Chris Charsley became the first Small Heath player to represent the England national football team, and Fred Jones was capped for Wales.

== Background ==
Small Heath Football Club's 1891–92 season had been relatively successful after several years of declining interest. On the field, they finished third in the Football Alliance. Off it, the Annual General Meeting of the club, held at Jenkins Street Board School in July 1892, heard that "skilful management, good matches, and capital 'gates'" had combined to produce a statement of financial affairs "distinctly creditable to managers and players", and the directors were to be congratulated. The club's application for election to the Football League First Division when it was expanded to 16 clubs was unsuccessful, but it was one of 12 clubs, mostly from the previous season's Football Alliance, elected to compete in the inaugural season of that league's Second Division. Alfred Jones had been acting as club secretary on a voluntary basis since 1885, when payment of players was first permitted. Prior to entering the Football League, the board of directors appointed him as the club's first paid official, as secretary-manager. Caesar Jenkyns captained the team.

All the regular first-team members during the previous season – goalkeepers Chris Charsley and George Hollis, backs Tom Bayley and Fred Speller, half-backs Ted Devey, Caesar Jenkyns and Billy Ollis, and forwards Jack Hallam, Tommy Hands, Harry Morris, Billy Walton and Fred Wheldon – remained with the club. Others from the Football Alliance side included the versatile Bernard Pumfrey and George Short, and the long-serving Charlie Simms, who was by 1892 employed as the first-team trainer, but retained his playing registration for emergencies. Among the newcomers were back Fred Jones from Newton Heath, forward Harry Edwards, signed from Singer's of Coventry, and centre-forward Frank Mobley, who joined soon after the start of the season, also from Singer's. They played in the same kit as in the previous season: royal blue shirts and stockings with white knickerbockers.

== Review ==
=== September ===
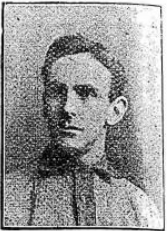
Fred Wheldon scored Small Heath's first goal in the Football League.

Small Heath opened their first season in the Football League at home to Burslem Port Vale. The match was due to kick off at 3:30 pm, but the visitors arrived half an hour late. Small Heath won the toss and, with the dual benefit of a strong wind behind them and their opponents having only ten men because their centre-forward Billy Beats had missed his train, had most of the play in the first half. After a near-miss by Tommy Hands, their first goal came as "the right wing took the ball in front of goal, and after a little scrimmaging it was sent between the posts"; the goal was credited to Fred Wheldon. Port Vale rallied, and the game, "more vigorous than scientific", was even until Small Heath scored twice just before half-time. In the second half, with the advantage of the wind, Port Vale pulled a goal back, but the final score was 5–1.

Small Heath made the short trip to Walsall Town Swifts for their first away match of the season. In a "hard-fought" game, Wheldon opened the scoring after 25 minutes with a "swift oblique shot" after all five forwards broke in a line. Walsall equalised with a scrappy goal from a corner, and attempted to impose themselves on the game, but the visitors' combination play held them at bay. Small Heath regained the lead when Walsall defender Alf Pinches headed into his own goal under pressure in a crowded goalmouth. In the second half, team captain Caesar Jenkyns increased the visitors' lead following a corner, and as the players of both sides tired, the play became disjointed, both goalkeepers had several saves to make, and a Walsall goal was disallowed for offside.

A benefit match for Harry Morris, who had been a regular first-team player since 1885 and captained the club in the 1891–92 season, produced an "exciting contest" against a Birmingham and District eleven which Small Heath won 4–3. The visit to Sheffield United proved less productive. The home side opened the scoring early on, and "only good half-back and back play by the visitors prevented the United greatly increasing the lead". In the second half, with "a brilliant sun shining in the faces of their opponents", the play was more even, and Jack Hallam came close to equalising, but Sheffield United made the score 2–0 three minutes from time, when Harry Hammond ran through the Small Heath defence and scored with a "magnificent shot".

A comfortable victory against Lincoln City, with two goals from Wheldon and one each from Jenkyns and debutant Frank Mobley, all scored before half-time, left Small Heath in fourth place in the division with three wins from their September programme. According to the Birmingham Daily Gazette, Mobley, "a determined player, though on the small side, [who] passes well to his wings", made a "very favourable impression for a first appearance".

=== October ===
October began with a 3–2 defeat at Grimsby Town. The home side, who "showed a clear superiority" in the first half, led 3–1 at half-time, and though Wheldon pulled one back from a free kick against the run of play, Small Heath did well to prevent Grimsby adding to their lead. Two days later they played a close game away to Burton Swifts in "dismal" weather; Small Heath led at half-time, Burton equalised 20 minutes into the second half, but Small Heath regained the lead and held on for a 3–2 win.

Their next game was an open affair at home to Crewe Alexandra, in which the accuracy of Crewe's shooting let them down. Despite playing against the wind, Small Heath led 2–0 by half-time, a lead extended to 6–0 by the close in a one-sided second half. Each goal was scored by a different player: Billy Walton, Hallam, Ted Devey, Wheldon, Hands and Mobley, of whom the Birmingham Daily Post suggested he had "the making of an excellent centre forward". Against division leaders Ardwick at Manchester, the home club took a two-goal lead by the interval, aided by some poor shooting by the visitors. Wheldon scored in the second half, and then a heavy rain- and hailstorm began, blowing into the faces of the Ardwick players. Wheldon scored again and Small Heath pressed hard, but their shooting failed to improve, and they were fortunate not to lose the game when a shot from William Lambie hit the crossbar.

Charsley put up a good performance playing on the winning side for the Midlands against a Lancashire and the North XI in a trial match for the Football League representative team. Although getting a hand to the first shot on target, from Sunderland's Jimmy Hannah, he could only turn it onto the underside of the bar and into the net. Early in the second half, he made a smart double save to thwart the same club's John Campbell, first from a "fast shot low down" and then from the rebound. Later on, Charsley held on to the ball in a scrimmage and needed the assistance of Sheffield Wednesday full-back Tom Brandon to keep from carrying the ball over the line.

In Small Heath's last game in October, at home to Darwen, a 3–2 victory was marred by a serious injury to full-back Fred Speller. Soon after kickoff. Speller was in the act of kicking the ball when the onrushing William Campbell collided with him, knocking him to the ground. A police constable administered first aid before the player, whose leg was broken, was carried from the field on a plank and taken to hospital. On a heavy pitch in poor condition, it was nearly impossible to dribble the ball, and Small Heath's decision to play on with only one back meant Darwen's attackers were frequently caught offside. (Note: In 1892, a player was in an offside position unless at least three opponents were between that player and the opponents' goalline when the ball was played forwards. These were normally the goalkeeper and two backs. With only one back, the defending team would need a half-back or forward to be in an unusually defensive position for an attacker to remain onside when the ball was played forward to him.) In the second half, Small Heath's forwards took control, and repeated attacks resulted in goals from Hallam and from Hands after Hallam had struck the bar. Darwen's committee decided not to proceed with a protest lodged "on account of the bankings at the corners of the field", despite "the Small Heath ground hardly reflect[ing] credit on a club which holds such an important position in the football world". The win meant Small Heath overtook Darwen to reach second place in the division.

=== November ===
Because of other teams' FA Cup engagements, Small Heath played only twice in the League during November. A comfortable victory by four goals to one at Bootle on 5 November took them to the top of the table, one point clear of Ardwick who lost at Grimsby. Their next game was less straightforward. At home to Burton Swifts, the visitors' superior finishing gave them a 2–0 lead at half-time; the second half was quite the opposite. Mobley scored from a Hallam cross after ten minutes, "shot after shot was sent in to the Burton goal", and eventually, with ten minutes left, Walton headed home the equaliser. The crowd's vocal support and the home side's "desperate efforts to win" were rewarded by Caesar Jenkyns with a late header.

Billy Walton scored the only goal of a friendly match against First Division team Derby County, in which Small Heath gave a first opportunity to brothers Arnold and Fred Jones. In the first half, Derby's attacks were foiled by the defensive tactics of the Small Heath half-backs, on fine form, and Wheldon twice hit the post. Derby, who had the better of the second half, appeared to score from a free kick, but the goal was disallowed because the ball had not been touched on its way to the net. That apart, Small Heath's defence held out, and Hollis, in goal for the unavailable Charsley, "defended brilliantly". The next weekend, they enjoyed a comfortable 4–1 win against Gainsborough Trinity. Despite playing only friendlies in the second half of the month, Small Heath retained their lead in the division, level on points with Darwen having played one game fewer.

=== December ===
In their first League match for three weeks, Small Heath played out a 1–1 draw with Sheffield United. Wheldon's positional sense left him free to receive a pass from Mobley and score after only five minutes, and then the game went from end to end, both sides attacking but failing to score. Full-back Fred Jones turned up late, but once he did take the field he was kept busy by the Sheffield forwards. The visitors had much the better of the second half; "shot after shot rained upon the Small Heath goal, and it was only by swarming round Charsley that the Coventry road men kept the ball out." With 11 minutes left, the ball was dribbled from the goal-line into midfield, then passed from flank to flank before a cross from Drummond found Davies who scored the equalising goal.

A top-of-the-table clash followed as Small Heath visited Darwen in what the Blackburn Standard described as "the most exciting game that has been played on the Darwen ground for years". In icy conditions, Small Heath scored early, again just before the interval, and a combination of home goalkeeper Kenyon and defender Orr presented them with a third soon afterwards; Darwen scored three times in the last 12 minutes to take the game 4–3. The same newspaper suggested that were it not for the "grand player" Charsley's "magnificent display, the Birmingham club would have met with a severe thrashing". The win gave Darwen a three-point lead in the table, having played one more game than Small Heath.

Small Heath returned to winning ways the following week at home to Walsall Town Swifts, producing what remains, their record League victory: they won 12–0. Six goals came in each half, three from Mobley, three by Walton, whose third was the culmination of a "brilliant run", and two each from the other three forwards, Hallam, Wheldon and Hands. The goalscoring continued on Christmas Eve with a 6–0 victory at Northwich Victoria, and a 3–1 home win against Crewe Alexandra which meant Small Heath would begin the new year at the top of the table. On Boxing Day, they visited Aston Villa for a friendly attended by 7,000 spectators. Without both Charsley and George Hollis, trainer Charlie Simms played in goal as Villa won 3–2 with the last kick of the game.

=== January ===
Simms made his Football League debut at Lincoln City in place of Caesar Jenkyns, who had missed his train. In bitterly cold weather, after snow had been cleared from the pitch, Lincoln took advantage of winning the toss by choosing to play downhill, and took a 2–1 lead. On change of ends, Small Heath came back into the game, and scored twice in the last quarter of an hour to take the game 4–3.

On a hard and dangerous playing surface, Small Heath had much the better of the game against Northwich Victoria. The visitors scored first, which only served to settle the home side. The forwards dominated, the remainder of the first half being "practically a bombardment of the Northwich goal". After Hallam used his pace to equalise, inside-left Wheldon was actively involved in the rest of the goals. Hallam just failed to reach the rebound from Wheldon's shot, and full-back Billy Ollis headed home from a Wheldon cross. The same player's shot across goal was tapped in by Walton, and a goal was awarded despite the Northwich goalkeeper's claim that the ball had not crossed the line. Wheldon himself scored the fourth with a "brilliant shot", then he and Hands ran the ball upfield before crossing for Hallam to score with a header. In the second half, Wheldon scored Small Heath's sixth from 30 yards (27 m), before the pace of the game dropped and Northwich scored a consolation with a long-range cross-shot.

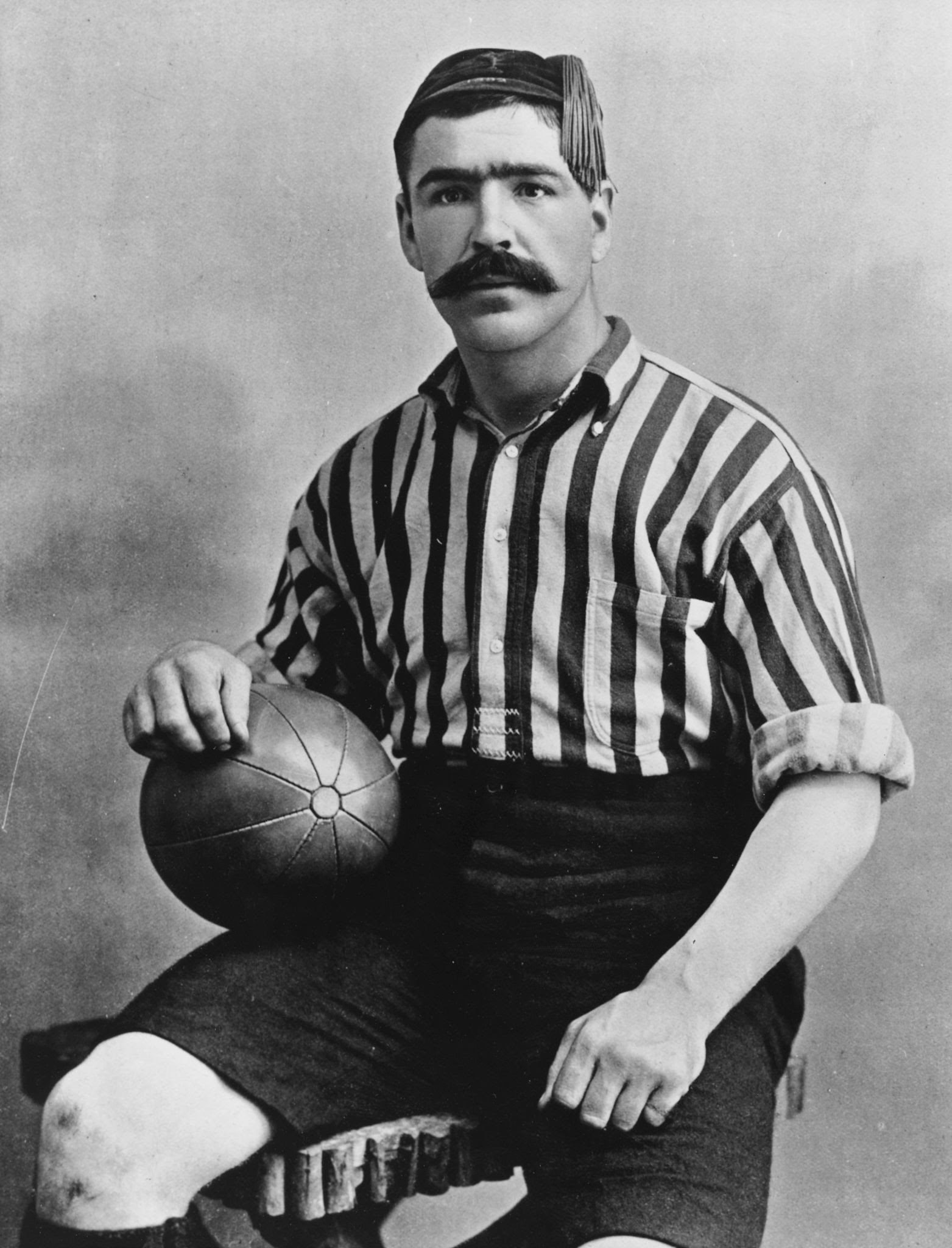
Caesar Jenkyns, Small Heath's captain

After the match, 150 guests attended a dinner at the Old Royal Hotel in central Birmingham "in order that the shareholders and friends of the Small Heath Club might meet the players and congratulate them of their achievements and wish them still further success". Walter Hart, the club's chairman, spoke of the good character of the players, most of whom still worked at their own trades when not required for football, suggesting that "a man who had nothing to do but loaf about from week's end to week's end was not ready for play, and such a mode of life was not conducive to good football". He praised the players' esprit de corps and pluck which had taken them to the top of the division, and encouraged them to resist the temptation to sign for other clubs, insisting that "whatever money [the club] made after providing things of necessity would come to the players and ... the club could do as well for its players, if they only clung together, as any club in the country". In reply, captain Caesar Jenkyns agreed that the players' efforts meant they "deserved all the praise that had been bestowed on them", and promised they would do their utmost to beat First Division club Burnley the following week in the FA Cup.

Despite media predictions of an upset, their utmost proved insufficient, though in the Dart's opinion, "Small Heath deserve[d] all praise for the splendid fight they made with the Burnley eleven, who are all great players on their own ground." Playing downwind, Burnley scored after half an hour from a scrimmage under the crossbar, and doubled their lead on the stroke of half-time. In the second half, "dangerous fouls" were given against both sides. Small Heath continued to play a neat passing game but were kept at bay by Burnley's strong defence and the offside rule.

Small Heath's final game of January was a 3–1 defeat of Burton Swifts in the Birmingham Cup. They went into February with a three-point lead over Darwen, each club having only four League games left to play. Sheffield United, in third place, eight points behind with five games in hand, were the only other team with a chance of overtaking them for the divisional title.

=== February ===
With no competitive fixture for the first two weekends of the month, friendlies were arranged against First Division Bolton Wanderers, at home, and Royal Arsenal away. With Charsley, a serving police officer, unavailable, regular full-back Fred Jones played in goal, giving an opportunity to triallist Arthur Littleford at right-back, as Small Heath beat Bolton 4–3, the visitors having a goal disallowed late on in the game. "In the presence of a large company", Arsenal won 3–1.

When Small Heath finally returned to League football, their forwards, "conspicuous for some really beautiful passing" on a soft and slippery playing surface, gave them a 6–2 victory over Bootle. The Sheffield & Rotherham Independent accepted that their local team was not going to win the title, for "Small Heath can scarcely be dislodged except by a very great reversal of form such as is not likely to come about", though still expected Sheffield United to finish in the top three.

Chris Charsley became the first Small Heath player to play for England, and only the second, after Caesar Jenkyns for Wales, to represent his country at full international level, when he took the field against Ireland on 27 February at Aston Villa's ground in Perry Barr, Birmingham. Although a strong team, it was composed solely of amateurs. Charsley had little to do, as England won the match 6–1, but a series of four saves in quick succession "demonstrated his ability between the sticks to everyone's satisfaction".

Back in the League, Hollis took Charsley's place in goal, as customary in the latter's absence. The heavy ground did not suit the visitors, Grimsby Town, and the Small Heath forwards' hard-working combination play brought them victory by eight goals to three. The following week, the Coventry Road ground hosted benefit matches for striking ironplate-workers. Around 1,500 spectators watched a match between tinplate- and ironplate-workers' elevens, followed by a second between teams raised by former Aston Villa captain Archie Hunter, whose poor health prevented him playing, and the recently retired Small Heath forward Eddy Stanley, who led his team to a 9–3 victory. Small Heath went into March with a four-point lead over Darwen, each club having only two League games left to play, but the former's goal average was so much superior that Sheffield United, in third place, ten points behind with five games in hand, were the only team still able to overhaul them.

=== March ===
Small Heath fielded eight of their regular starting eleven in a friendly against First Division Nottingham Forest. A close and exciting game, which featured "both goal-keepers displaying wonderful cleverness and resource", was won by Forest with a late goal. In their first competitive fixture of the month, the quarter-final of the Birmingham Cup, they beat Wednesbury Old Athletic, a team from the Birmingham & District League, by five goals to nil in a match "characterised by a good deal of rough play". A "fairly strong" team suffered a rare home defeat in a friendly against Middlesbrough of the Northern League. Jack Hallam appeared to score in the first half, but the referee disallowed the goal, having spotted that Hallam had knocked the ball in with hand rather than head, and Middlesbrough went on to score twice without reply in the second period.

Fred Jones missed the Middlesbrough match because of international duty. Selected among the reserves for Wales' match against Scotland, he was required to play after both first-choice backs dropped out. The Liverpool Mercury reported that he had "a wretched game at back and completely disorganised the Welsh defence", as Scotland won 8–0, while according to the Wrexham Advertiser, "some-one said that he appeared to have made a resolve before he went on the field not to kick the ball".

On 20 March, Small Heath played West Bromwich Albion in a benefit match for captain Caesar Jenkyns. Teddy Jolley made his first appearance for the club, and a relatively strong side whose forwards "were very quick on the ball, and passed remarkably well", notably Wheldon, who "as usual, played brilliantly", won 5–0 in front of about 4,000 spectators. In an uneventful penultimate League match of the regular season, Small Heath won 3–0 at the Athletic Ground against Burslem Port Vale, Walton opening the scoring just before half-time with a penalty kick. The Sheffield & Rotherham Independent now predicted that Sheffield United would win their remaining four matches, all away from home, to take the divisional title on goal average.

=== April ===
Despite competition from holiday entertainments which included the Military Tournament at Bingley Hall, Hengler's circus at Curzon Hall, the fairground, variety shows and dancing at Aston Lower Grounds, and boating and other amusements in the public parks, a large attendance was expected at Small Heath's last League match of the season, on a fine Easter weekend at home to Ardwick. Ardwick took an early lead, which Hands came close to equalising after a clever passing move with Wheldon. Just before the interval, Wheldon forced a corner, from which the ball was rushed across the line. In the second half, Small Heath went all out in attack, and after the Ardwick goalkeeper had made several saves, Walton scored with a header, and Hallam made it three from a Walton pass. Ardwick pulled one back, but Small Heath's "admirable defence" held out "by watchfulness and combination" for a gratifying result for the supporters. On Easter Monday they visited Middlesbrough where they lost 2–1 to the Ironopolis club in a friendly.

The next Saturday saw the meeting with Aston Villa in the semifinal of the Birmingham Senior Cup. Both clubs fielded full first teams, Small Heath missing only Walton, for whom Harry Edwards proved a "very indifferent" substitute. In front of 15,000 spectators at Aston Lower Grounds, Small Heath outplayed their First Division opponents for the first half-hour, and had several chances which they failed to take, but Aston Villa improved thereafter, winning 5–0 after a quite one-sided second half.

Final league table (part)
Pos	Club	Pld	W	D	L	F	A	Pts
1st	Small Heath	22	17	2	3	90	35	36
2nd	Sheffield United	22	16	3	3	62	19	35
3rd	Darwen	22	14	2	6	60	36	30
4th	Grimsby Town	22	11	1	10	42	41	23
Key: Pld = Matches played; W = Matches won; D = Matches drawn; L = Matches lost; F = Goals for; A = Goals against; Pts = Points

On the Monday, Darwen visited Small Heath to play a benefit match for Fred Speller, who had been injured playing against that club in October. Unfortunately for the beneficiary, the attendance was affected by the semi-final of the Mayor's Charity Cup between Aston Villa and West Bromwich Albion being played the same day. Friendlies against First Division Stoke and West Bromwich Albion produced wins by 4–2 and 4–1 respectively, and Sheffield United's failure to beat Walsall in their last League match of the season confirmed Small Heath as inaugural Second Division champions. Ahead of the promotion test match, against 16th-placed First Division team Newton Heath at Stoke's Victoria Ground, the Birmingham Daily Gazette was sure that "all the good wishes of Midland sportsmen will go with the Heathens for their success after a consistently good season's performance".

Small Heath forced several early corners, but then conceded on the break when Alf Farman scored from a Tommy Fitzsimmons pass. Towards half-time, they had chances from a scramble in front of the Newton Heath goal, and pressed hard after the interval, the persistence of Wheldon eventually securing an equaliser "after brilliant work by all of the Small Heath forwards". "Capital defensive play" by both teams prevailed thereafter, and the match was drawn. The Manchester Guardian noted the contrast in attacking style, as "the Small Heath players were playing a most scientific game, but the rushes of Newton Heath were often very dangerous", and the Gazette's reporter felt that half-backs George Short and, particularly, Jenkyns had been "inclined to take matters a little too easily" in the first half.

Two days later, Small Heath, with Jack Lee and Bernard Pumfrey in the forward line instead of Walton and Mobley, and Littleford standing in at back, played a similarly depleted Wolverhampton Wanderers in the semi-final of the Mayor of Birmingham's Charity Cup. Hands scored Small Heath's opening goal, but sustained a leg injury after about half an hour; although he continued for a time, he was struggling, and could not complete the game. Despite the numerical disadvantage, Lee scored twice for Small Heath to take the tie 3–1.

Harry Morris replaced the injured Hands at outside left for the test match replay at Olive Grove, Sheffield. Newton Heath had a goal disallowed for handball before Wheldon opened the scoring with a powerful shot from distance. After several attacks at each end – Tom Bayley cleared off the line and Wheldon hit the foot of a post – Farman equalised after 37 minutes with a penalty awarded against Bayley for handball. Soon after half-time, Newton Heath took the lead from a goalmouth scramble, within a minute a pass from Hallam found Walton who equalised, but in the end Small Heath were overrun. With 18 minutes remaining, goals from Joe Cassidy, Jimmy Coupar and Farman made the final score 5–2, ensuring that Small Heath would remain in the Second Division for another year.

In the final of the Mayor's Charity Cup at the Lower Grounds – Small Heath's last competitive match of the season, and their fourth in eight days – Hallam opened the scoring from the rebound after a long shot hit the post in the first attacking move of the game. Aston Villa took a 2–1 lead, Small Heath equalised in the second half, but Villa scored the winning goal after torrential rain had driven "a great many" of the spectators from the ground.

== Summary and aftermath ==
Small Heath F.C. pictured in 1893 with the Football League Second Division trophy. Players: (standing, left to right) Jolley, Hollis, Devey; (seated) Hallam, Pumfrey, Mobley, Jenkyns, Wheldon, Hands; (on ground) Ollis, Lee.

Small Heath went through the season unbeaten at Coventry Road. In the League, they scored 90 goals, at a rate of more than 4 goals per game, and all five first-choice forwards reached double figures. The leading scorer was Fred Wheldon, with 25 goals from the 22 League fixtures and 1 in the test match, a total which made him the top scorer for the Second Division. (Note: Though Matthews' Complete Record credits Wheldon with 25 regular-season Football League goals, the RSSSF has only 24, a total which still made him the Second Division top scorer.) Wheldon, Tommy Hands and Billy Ollis were ever-present in the League, and Caesar Jenkyns and Jack Hallam missed only one game apiece.

Unable to dislodge Wheldon or Billy Walton from the inside forward position, Harry Edwards chose to leave at the end of the season. Tom Bayley was released, and Fred Jones left for Lincoln City after losing his place at left back to Bernard Pumfrey. Harry Morris retired to concentrate on his plumbing business. Fred Speller attempted a comeback, appearing twice for the first team in September 1893, but the injury received against Darwen effectively proved the end of his football career.

Speculation by "people who profess to believe that these test matches will not be played at all, and that if they are, and a First Division team is knocked out, the rules will be circumvented in some way" proved unfounded. The League's Annual General Meeting heard proposals that the First Division be expanded to either 20 or 18 teams. Both motions were seconded by Small Heath – not surprisingly, after they as champions had failed to gain promotion while the teams in second and third place had succeeded – but both were defeated, thus confirming that the team would play in the Second Division for the 1893–94 season. Small Heath were to finish that season as runners-up and, this time, achieved promotion to the First Division via the test matches.

== Match details ==
For consistency, attendances and goalscorers' names in the League, Test Match and FA Cup match details tables are sourced from Matthews' Complete Record. Attendance figures were estimated, so information in contemporary newspaper reports could, and often did, differ. For example, the attendance at the last match of the regular season, against Ardwick, is variously recorded as 1,000, 2,000, and "about 4,000". League positions are sourced from 11v11.com.

=== Football League Second Division ===
Date	League position	Opponents	Venue	Result	Score F–A	Scorers	Attendance
3 September 1892	3rd	Burslem Port Vale	H	W	5–1	Wheldon 2, Short, Hallam, Edwards	2,000
10 September 1892	2nd	Walsall Town Swifts	A	W	3–1	Wheldon, Pinches (og), Jenkyns	2,500
17 September 1892	3rd	Sheffield United	A	L	0–2		3,500
24 September 1892	4th	Lincoln City	H	W	4–1	Wheldon 2, Jenkyns, Mobley	2,500
1 October 1892	4th	Grimsby Town	A	L	2–3	Wheldon 2	3,000
3 October 1892	4th	Burton Swifts	A	W	3–2	Wheldon, Lawrence (og), Mobley	2,000
8 October 1892	3rd	Crewe Alexandra	H	W	6–0	Walton, Wheldon, Hallam, Devey, Mobley, Hands	2,500
22 October 1892	3rd	Ardwick	A	D	2–2	Wheldon 2	6,000
29 October 1892	2nd	Darwen	A	W	3–2	Mobley, Hallam, Hands	2,000
5 November 1892	1st	Bootle	H	W	4–1	Walton, Mobley, Wheldon, Hands	1,500
12 November 1892	1st	Burton Swifts	H	W	3–2	Mobley, Walton, Jenkyns	3,000
3 December 1892	2nd	Sheffield United	H	D	1–1	Wheldon	2,000
10 December 1892	2nd	Darwen	A	L	3–4	Hallam 2, Hands	3,000
17 December 1892	2nd	Walsall Town Swifts	H	W	12–0	Wheldon 2, Walton 3, Hallam 2, Mobley 3, Hands 2	2,000
24 December 1892	2nd	Northwich Victoria	A	W	6–0	Mobley 2, Wheldon 2, Walton, Hands	1,000
31 December 1892	1st	Crewe Alexandra	A	W	3–1	Mobley, Hands, Hallam	1,500
7 January 1893	1st	Lincoln City	A	W	4–3	Wheldon 3, Hands	1,500
14 January 1893	1st	Northwich Victoria	H	W	6–2	Ollis, Wheldon 3, Walton, Hallam	2,000
18 February 1893	1st	Bootle	H	W	6–2	Hallam 3, Mobley 2, Wheldon	2,000
25 February 1893	1st	Grimsby Town	H	W	8–3	Hands 2, Hallam 2, Wheldon, Walton 3	2,500
25 March 1893	1st	Burslem Port Vale	A	W	3–0	Walton 2, Hallam	1,000
1 April 1893	1st	Ardwick	H	W	3–2	Hallam 2, Walton	1,000

=== Test Matches ===
Date	Opponents	Venue	Result	Score F–A	Scorers	Attendance
22 April 1893	Newton Heath	Victoria Ground, Stoke-on-Trent	D	1–1	Wheldon	4,000
27 April 1893	Newton Heath	Olive Grove, Sheffield	L	2–5	Walton, Mobley	6,000

=== FA Cup ===
Round	Date	Opponents	Venue	Result	Score F–A	Scorers	Attendance
1st	30 January 1893	Burnley	A	L	0–2		6,500

=== Birmingham Senior Cup ===
Round	Date	Opponents	Venue	Result	Score F–A	Scorers	Attendance	Ref
1st	28 January 1893	Burton Swifts	Peel Croft, Burton upon Trent	W	3–1	Not known	Not known	
QF	11 March 1893	Wednesbury Old Athletic	Coventry Road	W	5–0	Hallam 2, Hands, not known (2)	Not known	
SF	8 April 1893	Aston Villa	Aston Lower Grounds	L	0–5		15,000	

=== Mayor of Birmingham's Charity Cup ===
Round	Date	Opponents	Venue	Result	Score F–A	Scorers	Attendance	Ref
SF	24 April 1893	Wolverhampton Wanderers	Stoney Lane, West Bromwich	W	3–1	Hands, Lee 2	1,500	
Final	29 April 1893	Aston Villa	Aston Lower Grounds	L	2–3	Hallam, not known	8,000	

=== Other matches ===
Date	Opponents	Venue	Result	Score F–A	Scorers	Attendance	Notes
12 September 1892	Birmingham & District FA	H	W	4–3	Not known	Not known	Benefit match for Harry Morris
19 November 1892	Derby County	H	W	1–0	Walton	3,000	Friendly match
26 November 1892	Gainsborough Trinity	H	W	4–1	Not known	Not known	Friendly match
26 December 1892	Aston Villa	A	L	2–3	Mobley, Walton	7,000	Friendly match
4 February 1893	Bolton Wanderers	H	W	4–3	Mobley, Hands, Wheldon, not known	Not known	Friendly match
11 February 1893	Royal Arsenal	A	L	1–3	Hallam	Not known	Friendly match
4 March 1893	Nottingham Forest	H	L	2–3	Mobley, Wheldon	6,000	Friendly match
18 March 1893	Middlesbrough	H	L	0–2		Not known	Friendly match
20 March 1893	West Bromwich Albion	H	W	5–0	Not known (4), Wheldon	4,000	Benefit match for Caesar Jenkyns
3 April 1893	Middlesbrough Ironopolis	A	L	1–2	Not known	Not known	Friendly match
10 April 1893	Darwen	H	W	3–2	Not known	Not known	Benefit match for Fred Speller
15 April 1893	Stoke	H	W	4–2	Hallam, Wheldon 2, Hands	Not known	Friendly match
17 April 1893	West Bromwich Albion	A	W	4–1	Wheldon 2, Mobley 2	Not known	Friendly match

== Appearances and goals ==
This table includes appearances and goals in nationally organised competitive matches – the Football League, including test matches, and FA Cup – only.
For a description of the playing positions, see Formation (association football)#2–3–5 (Pyramid).

Players' appearances and goals by competition
Name	Position	League		Test match		FA Cup		Total	
Name	Position	Apps	Goals	Apps	Goals	Apps	Goals	Apps	Goals
Chris Charsley	Goalkeeper	14	0	2	0	1	0	17	0
George Hollis	Goalkeeper	8	0	0	0	0	0	8	0
Tom Bayley	Full back	18	0	2	0	1	0	21	0
Fred Jones	Full back	8	0	0	0	1	0	9	0
Bernard Pumfrey	Full back	3	0	2	0	0	0	5	0
Josiah Roberts	Full back	1	0	0	0	0	0	1	0
George Short	Full back	10	1	2	0	1	0	13	1
Fred Speller	Full back	9	0	0	0	0	0	9	0
Ted Devey	Half back	18	1	0	0	0	0	18	1
Caesar Jenkyns	Half back	21	3	2	0	1	0	24	3
Harry Morris	Half back	1	0	1	0	0	0	2	0
William Ollis	Half back	22	1	2	0	1	0	25	1
Charlie Simms	Half back	1	0	0	0	0	0	1	0
Harry Edwards	Forward	5	1	0	0	0	0	5	1
Jack Hallam	Forward	21	17	2	0	1	0	24	17
Tommy Hands	Forward	22	11	1	0	1	0	24	11
Frank Mobley	Forward	19	14	2	1	1	0	22	15
Billy Walton	Forward	19	14	2	1	1	0	22	15
Fred Wheldon	Forward	22	25	2	1	1	0	25	26

== See also ==
- Birmingham City F.C. seasons
