= Charles Izon =

English footballer

Personal information
- Full name: Charles John Izon
- Date of birth: 1872
- Place of birth: Stourbridge, England
- Position: Forward

Senior career*
| Years | Team | Apps | (Gls) |
| – | Old Hill Wanderers | | |
| – | Halesowen | | |
| 1893–1897 | Small Heath | 25 | (8) |
| 1897–???? | Walsall | 7 | (0) |
- * Club domestic league appearances and goals

Charles John Izon (1872 – after 1897) was an English professional footballer who made 32 appearances in the Football League playing for Small Heath and Walsall.

Izon was born in Stourbridge, Worcestershire. His forward play with Old Hill Wanderers and Halesowen earned him a good reputation, and there was strong competition in the Birmingham area for his signature. He joined Second Division champions Small Heath in September 1893, and made his debut in the Football League on 16 September, scoring a hat-trick in a 4–0 win at home to Walsall Town Swifts. Izon played his part in the club finishing in runners-up spot, but was unable to displace the prolific Frank Mobley or Fred Wheldon, and played only 26 games in three and a half years. He moved on to Walsall in January 1897.
