= Fred Speller =

English footballer

Personal information
- Full name: Frederick John Speller
- Date of birth: 1863
- Place of birth: Wooburn, Buckinghamshire
- Date of death: 17 August 1909 (aged 45–46)
- Place of death: Winson Green, Birmingham
- Position: Full back

Senior career*
Years	Team	Apps	(Gls)
- Great Marlow
1888–1894	Small Heath	75	(0)
- * Club domestic league appearances and goals

Frederick John Speller (1863 – 17 August 1909) was an English professional footballer who played as a full back. He played for hometown club Great Marlow before signing for Small Heath. He made 93 appearances in the FA Cup, Football Alliance and the Football League for the club in its early days. His career was ended prematurely when he broke his leg in a match against Darwen in 1892, the season when Small Heath won the inaugural Second Division championship. Although he played a couple of league games a year later, he retired from the game in 1894. After a sudden breakdown, he died in an asylum in 1909, when he was remembered as "one of the strongest backs who ever represented the allied counties of Berks and Bucks."

== Life and career ==
=== Marlow ===
Speller was born in Wooburn near Marlow, Buckinghamshire, and played football as an amateur for his hometown club, Great Marlow. He appeared in the semi-final of the 1881–82 FA Cup as Marlow suffered a heavy defeat to eventual winners Old Etonians – Bell's Life in London's reporter thought the backs "hardly up to the mark" – and helped the club to victories in the 1885 and 1886 Berks and Bucks Challenge Cup. He was a regular selection in the Berks and Bucks Football Association representative eleven to play against other associations. Among his numerous appearances for that team, he featured in the annual fixture against the Sheffield Association in 1883, as one of four players described by the York Herald as "perhaps ... the pick of the Southerners", in 1885, where the Sheffield and Rotherham Independent noted that the crossing by the Sheffield wings "gave Field and Speller any amount of work, but they were equal to the occasion, and by ponderous kicking they relieved the pressure", and 1887.

=== Early league football ===
Speller joined Small Heath in 1888. The club were then playing in the Combination, a league established to include those teams not invited to join the inaugural season of the Football League. Against Long Eaton Rangers in a Combination match in October, Speller's long shot led to Devey's fourth goal as Small Heath won 6–2. In November, the Birmingham Daily Post assessed the team as "quite equal, if not superior, to several of the league clubs" by reason of new players "whose presence materially strengthens the eleven"; they singled out centre-forward Will Devey and Speller, whom they described as "a fine little back [who] kicks and tackles splendidly". Representing Warwickshire against the Manchester Association in February 1890, alongside Small Heath teammates Chris Charsley, Harry Morris, Caesar Jenkyns and Will Devey, Speller sprained an ankle during the second half. The injury kept him out for Small Heath's next two games.

The Combination folded, and Small Heath became founder members of the Football Alliance in 1890. In his second game in that league, he was noted as "defend[ing] in fine style" as Small Heath lost 3–0 at home to Sunderland Albion. According to the Birmingham Daily Post, his defence was "very safe" as Small Heath comfortably defeated Hednesford Town in the FA Cup, but rather less secure when he obstructed his goalkeeper, allowing Horace Pike to score for Nottingham Forest. Small Heath went on to win an exciting game by five goals to four to inflict Forest's first home defeat of the 1890–91 Football Alliance season. The following season, Small Heath accepted £200 to switch the venue of their FA Cup tie against Sheffield Wednesday to the Wednesday's ground at Olive Grove. In rough weather and against rough play – the Wednesday finished the game with nine men – the defence of Bayley, Speller and Jenkyns was singled out for praise by the Sheffield and Rotherham Independent, but they were unable to prevent a defeat.

=== The Football League ===
Small Heath were elected to the Second Division of the Football League for its inaugural season in 1892. In October, in a match against Darwen, Speller broke his leg in collision with opponent William Campbell. The Birmingham Daily Post reported it thus:

The Small Heath team were almost from the commencement placed at a disadvantage owing to a rather serious accident which happened to one of their players. The game was begun by Small Heath, who were for the moment pressed by their opponents. When near the Small Heath goal Speller and Campbell came into contact with each other, and Speller fell to the ground with a broken leg. A policeman, a member of the St. John's Ambulance Corps, attended to the limb, and the injured man was removed from the field on a plank.

He was taken to the Queen's Hospital for treatment. The following April, Small Heath and Darwen played a benefit match for Speller; unfortunately for the beneficiary, the attendance was adversely affected by the Birmingham Charity Cup match between Aston Villa and West Bromwich Albion on the same day. A variety of full-backs stood in for him as Small Heath went on to win the Second Division title.

When training resumed for the 1893–94 season, full-back Tom Bayley had been released, but the Post expected Speller to take his place. He had played in practice matches and was "fully confident of his ability to perform as well as ever he did". Teddy Jolley and newcomer Bernard Pumfrey began the season at full back, but a defeat at Liverpool and a heavy defeat at Burslem Port Vale gave Speller his chance. His first game for almost a year came in a visit to Ardwick, won 1–0 by Small Heath. According to the Post, "he played carefully at the start, but gained confidence as the game proceeded, and many times put a stop to extremely dangerous attacks by the clever right wing of the home team." He played in the next game, a 5–2 win at home to Grimsby Town, then lost his place to William Reynolds. At Christmas, Small Heath played a friendly at Marlow, in which Speller had "not been seen in such form since his leg was broken". Nevertheless, he retired at the end of the season. Before he broke his leg, he had not missed a game in League or FA Cup since the ankle injury some two-and-a-half years earlier.

While a Small Heath player, Speller lived in Muntz Street, the street that marked one side of the club's ground in the Small Heath district of Birmingham. The 1891 Census recorded him sharing lodgings with teammate Fred Heath and employed as a gun maker.

== Institutionalisation and death ==
Speller was later engaged as a groundsman for Birmingham F.C. On 22 April 1909, Speller went to Cookham to watch the 1909 FA Cup final at the Crystal Palace. Speller, who was staying with his brother in Cookham, had recently suffered from influenza. According to his brother, Speller appeared "unwell" and weakened by the influenza, but otherwise normal. The following morning, however, Speller was found wandering down one of the main streets of Cookham "brandishing a heavy stake" and threatening a woman and a constable who approached him. According to The Yorkshire Post,

He struggled violently, and it required several constables to convey him to the station. In his cell he smashed the windows and became so dangerous that he had to be strongly bound. Dr. Cronyn certified that Speller was insane.

On 24 April, he appeared in court at Maidenhead—"on a charge of being a wandering lunatic"—and was sent to a county insane asylum. Newspapers reported that he was a "pitiful" sight in court, lying on the floor both handcuffed and shackled, while moaning and talking incoherently, but wearing a Berks and Bucks Cup gold medal. Speller interrupted proceedings frequently, exclaiming that he was "the champion footballer" and "the best little back in the world." He also complained of head pain, yelling, "My poor head! Oh, my head!"

Speller's mysterious transformation was reported with sorrow by journalists. The South Bucks Standard newspaper reported, "A great deal of sympathy is felt hereabouts for Speller, who is a sober, well-conducted man, held in much respect not only in Berks and Bucks, but at Birmingham, where he has been very popular."

Speller was transferred to the Winson Green asylum in Birmingham on 6 July 1909, and died five weeks later.
