= Fred Jones (footballer, born 1867) =

Welsh footballer

Personal information
- Full name: Frederick William Jones
- Date of birth: January 1867
- Place of birth: Llandudno, Wales
- Date of death: 27 December 1910 (aged 43)
- Place of death: Llandudno, Wales
- Position: Left back

Senior career*
Years	Team	Apps	(Gls)
- Llandudno Swifts
- West Manchester
1890	Burslem Port Vale	3	(0)
1890–1892	Newton Heath	0	(0)
1892–1893	Small Heath	8	(0)
1893	Lincoln City	7	(0)
- Reading
- Llandudno Swifts

International career
1893	Wales	1	(0)
- * Club domestic league appearances and goals

Frederick William Jones (January 1867 – 27 December 1910) was a Welsh international footballer who played in the Football League for Small Heath and Lincoln City.

== Career ==
Jones was born in Llandudno, which was then in Caernarfonshire, and began his football career with Llandudno Swifts before trying his luck in England. He began with West Manchester and, in the summer of 1890, moved on to Burslem Port Vale. He made his debut in a friendly at Newton Heath on 1 September 1890. He must have spoken to the opposition management as he left on a transfer to Newton Heath at his own request at the end of the month.

Without playing a competitive game for the club in nearly two years, Jones left Newton Heath for Football League Second Division club Small Heath in August 1892. His brother Arnold also played for the club during the 1892–93 season, though he never appeared for the first team. After Fred Speller broke his leg, Jones took over the left back position, making his debut on 3 December 1892 in a 1–1 draw at home to Sheffield United, and played nine games in all competitions, contributing to Small Heath's Second Division title.

On 18 March 1893, Jones won his first and only full international cap for Wales, and became the first Small Heath player to be capped by Wales; Wales lost 8–0 to Scotland.

By then, Jones had lost his place in Small Heath's starting eleven to Bernard Pumfrey, and in September 1893, he joined fellow Second Division club Lincoln City. He played nine times in all competitions for Lincoln's first-team, later joining Reading and then returning to Wales. In the latter part of his career, he was employed more often as an emergency goalkeeper than a full-back.

Jones was found dead in the street in his native Llandudno; his death, in 1910 at the age of 43, was attributed to an apoplectic seizure.

== Career statistics ==
Appearances and goals by club, season and competition
Club	Season	League			FA Cup		Other		Total	
Club	Season	Division	Apps	Goals	Apps	Goals	Apps	Goals	Apps	Goals
Burslem Port Vale	1890–91	Midland League	3	0	0	0	0	0	3	0
Small Heath	1892–93	Second Division	8	0	1	0	0	0	9	0
Lincoln City	1893–94	Second Division	7	0	2	0	0	0	9	0
