= George Hollis =

George Hollis may refer to:

- George Hollis (VC) (1833–1879)
- George Hollis (bishop) (1868–1944)
- George Hollis (footballer) (1869–1897)
