= Littleford =

Littleford is a surname. Notable people with the surname include:

- Arthur Littleford (1868–1934), English footballer
- Beth Littleford (born 1968), American actress, comedian, and television personality
- Hal Littleford (1924–2016), American football player and coach and politician
