= Bill Edwards (English footballer) =

English footballer

Personal information
- Date of birth: 1874
- Place of birth: Coventry, England
- Date of death: Unknown
- Place of death: Coventry, England
- Position: Outside left

Senior career*
Years	Team	Apps	(Gls)
- Singer's
1896–1897	Small Heath	5	(1)
1897–1???	Rugby		
- * Club domestic league appearances and goals

William H. Edwards (1874 – after 1896) was an English professional footballer who played in the Football League for Small Heath.

Edwards was born in Coventry, Warwickshire. An outside left, he played football for Singer's before joining Small Heath in September 1896 as a replacement for Tommy Hands, who had walked out of the club after six seasons as first choice on the left wing. Edwards made his debut in the Second Division on the opening day of the 1896–97 season in a 3–1 win at home to Newcastle United, and played four of the next six games, scoring once, before losing his place and not regaining it. Described as "enthusiastic [but] rather limited", he left for non-league football with Rugby.

Edwards' older brother Harry was also a professional footballer who played for Small Heath.
