= Harry Edwards (English footballer) =

English footballer

Personal information
- Full name: Henry Roby Edwards
- Date of birth: 26 September 1872
- Place of birth: Birmingham, England
- Date of death: 3 October 1940 (aged 68)
- Place of death: Bedford, England
- Position: Inside forward

Senior career*
Years	Team	Apps	(Gls)
1891–1892	Singer's		
1892–1893	Small Heath	5	(1)
1893	Ryton Rovers		
1893–1894	Leicester Fosse	12	(2)
1894–1895	Derby County	0	(0)
1895–1898	Wolverton L&NWR		
1898–1900	Watford	7	(0)
1900–190?	Bedford Queens Works		
- * Club domestic league appearances and goals

Henry Roby Edwards (26 September 1872 – 3 October 1940) was an English professional footballer who played in the Football League for Small Heath.

== Life and career ==
Henry Roby Edwards was born on 26 September 1872 in Birmingham, Warwickshire. He began his football career with Coventry club Singer's, for whom he scored in the 1891–92 Birmingham Junior Cup final against Willenhall Pickwick; his team lost two men to injury in the first ten minutes before scoring twice in the second to retain their title. An inside forward, he attracted the attention of the Small Heath club, whose scout went to watch him playing for Singer's; they signed him, together with his more impressive team-mate Frank Mobley, who went on to score 64 goals in four seasons for Small Heath. Edwards played in the first five games of the 1892–93 Second Division season – Small Heath's first in the Football League – and scored on his and their debut, in a 5–1 defeat of Burslem Port Vale, but could not compete with established inside forwards Billy Walton and the prolific Fred Wheldon.

After a spell with Ryton Rovers, Edwards signed for Midland League club Leicester Fosse in October 1893. He again scored on debut, completing a 4–0 win at home to Mansfield Town, and continued as a regular in the side until the following March, a leg injury keeping him out of the last few matches of the season as Leicester confirmed their runners-up spot and successful application for admission to the Football League.

Edwards apparently spent much of his season "in a pay dispute with the club committee", and, having helped them reach the second round (last 16) of the 1893–94 FA Cup, in which they lost to Football League First Division club Derby County only after a replay, he signed for Derby in May 1894. After a year without playing for the first team, he joined Southern League Second Division club Wolverton L&NWR. Edwards settled well at Wolverton, playing as an attacking centre half, and helped them gain promotion to the Southern League First Division via the test match system. He stayed a further two years with Wolverton, making 43 league appearances, before turning down their offer of terms for the 1898–99 season.

After a spell without a club, he signed for fellow Southern League club Watford in December 1898. He made seven appearances in all competitions in the first three months of his two years with the club, and moved on to Bedford Queen's Works of the Northamptonshire League. He captained the team, and remained until at least the 1902–03 season when they moved into the South Eastern League.

After football, Edwards worked as a steam engine fitter in the Bedford area. He died in Bedford on 3 October 1940 at the age of 68.

Edwards' younger brother Bill was also a professional footballer who played for Small Heath.

== Sources ==
- Joyce, Michael (2004). Football League Players' Records 1888 to 1939. Nottingham: SoccerData. ISBN 978-1-899468-67-6.
- Matthews, Tony (1995). Birmingham City: A Complete Record. Derby: Breedon Books. ISBN 978-1-85983-010-9.
- Smith, Dave; Taylor, Paul (2001). Of Fossils and Foxes. Leicester: Polar. ISBN 978-1-899538-21-8.
