= John Spilsbury =

John Spilsbury may refer to:

- John Spilsbury (Baptist minister), leader of the Particular Baptists in 17th-century England
- John Spilsbury (cartographer), London mapmaker and engraver who invented the jigsaw puzzle
- John Spilsbury (cricketer), English cricketer
