= Gilbert Smith (footballer, born 1869) =

English footballer

Personal information
- Full name: Gilbert Smith
- Date of birth: 1869
- Place of birth: Oldbury, England
- Date of death: Unknown
- Position: Right back

Senior career*
Years	Team	Apps	(Gls)
- Causeway Green Villa
1893–1894	Small Heath	14	(0)
1894–1???	Berwick Rangers (Worcester)		
- * Club domestic league appearances and goals

Gilbert Smith (1869 – after 1893) was an English professional footballer who played in the Football League for Small Heath. Born in Oldbury, which was then part of Worcestershire, Smith was recommended to Small Heath by Fred Wheldon, and given a run of games at right back in the 1893–94 season. He was no improvement on other candidates for the position, and he returned to the reserves, and thence to non-league football with Berwick Rangers (Worcester) in 1894.

== Honours ==
- Football League Second Division runners-up: 1893–94
