= George Short (footballer) =

English footballer

Personal information
- Full name: George Frederick Short
- Date of birth: 1866
- Place of birth: Birmingham, England
- Date of death: Unknown
- Position: Utility player

Senior career*
Years	Team	Apps	(Gls)
- Unity Gas
1887–1895	Small Heath	31	(5)
1895–1???	Oldbury Town		
- * Club domestic league appearances and goals

George Frederick Short (1866 – after 1895) was an English professional footballer who made 18 appearances in the Football League playing for Small Heath.

Short was born in Birmingham. He played football for the Unity Gas Depot works team before joining Small Heath in 1887. In Small Heath's first season in the Football Alliance, Short scored four goals in 13 appearances playing as a winger, but later he became most comfortable at full back. This meant a lengthy spell in the reserve team, because first-choice defenders Tom Bayley and Fred Speller missed only two games between them in the next two seasons. Short returned to the first team for the club's first season in the Football League in 1892–93, contributing to their winning the inaugural Second Division championship. He helped the club to runners-up spot in the Second Division the following season, which this time brought promotion to the First Division via the test match system, but never played in the top flight. He joined Oldbury Town of the Birmingham & District League in 1895.

Short's younger brother Charlie also played professionally for Small Heath.
