= Teddy Jolley =

English footballer (1871–c.1895)

Personal information
- Full name: Edwin Jolley
- Date of birth: June 1871
- Place of birth: Birmingham, England
- Date of death: Unknown
- Position: Centre half

Senior career*
| Years | Team | Apps | (Gls) |
- Guildford Street
- Lozells
| 1893–1896 | Small Heath | 21 | (2) |
| 1896–1??? | Berwick Rangers (Worcester) | | |
- * Club domestic league appearances and goals

Edwin Jolley (June 1871 – after 1895) was an English professional footballer who made 21 appearances in the Football League playing for Small Heath.

Jolley was born in Lozells, Birmingham. He attended Lozells Street School, and played football for local sides Guildford Street and Lozells before joining Football League Second Division champions Small Heath in August 1893. He made his debut on 2 September, the opening day of the 1893–94 season, playing at right back in a 3–1 win at home to Walsall Town Swifts, and scored two goals the following week playing on the right wing, but appeared only rarely for the first team, deputising for Caesar Jenkyns or Ted Devey in the half-back line, during that and the next season. Playing for the reserve team in the Birmingham & District League in 1895, he scored a hat-trick of own goals. After Jenkyns left, Jolley had a run of games at his preferred position of centre half at the start of the 1895–96 season, but lost his place and left for Berwick Rangers (Worcester) in September 1896.
