= John Lee (footballer, born 1869) =

English footballer

Personal information
- Full name: John Sebastian Lee
- Date of birth: 1869
- Place of birth: Walsall Wood, England
- Date of death: Unknown
- Position: Forward

Senior career*
Years	Team	Apps	(Gls)
- Walsall Unity
1893–1895	Small Heath	7	(3)
1895–1897	Old Hill Wanderers		
1897–1899	Bilston United		
1899–19xx	Darlaston		
- * Club domestic league appearances and goals

John Sebastian Lee (1869 – after 1899), also known as Jack Lee, was an English professional footballer who played in the Football League for Small Heath. He played as a forward.

Lee was born in Walsall Wood, then in Staffordshire. He played local football for Walsall Unity before joining Small Heath in 1893. Described as "a diminutive sharpshooter", Lee made his debut on the opening day of the 1893–94 Second Division season, and scored twice in a 3–1 win away at Walsall Town Swifts. He played in the next six games, scoring once more, but then lost his place to Billy Walton, whose form – 16 goals from 20 games – meant he retained the inside-right position for the remainder of the season. Lee dropped back into non-league football in 1895, preferring to remain in his native West Midlands rather than join a league side elsewhere.
