= Walter Jackson (footballer) =

English footballer

Personal information
- Date of birth: 1870
- Place of birth: Birmingham, England
- Date of death: Unknown
- Position: Outside right

Senior career*
Years	Team	Apps	(Gls)
- Harborne
1893–1894	Small Heath	4	(1)
1894–1???	Berwick Rangers (Worcester)		
- * Club domestic league appearances and goals

Walter S. Jackson (1870 – after 1893) was an English professional footballer who played in the Football League for Small Heath.

Born in the Northfield district of Birmingham, Jackson played local football before joining Small Heath in September 1893. He made his debut in the Second Division on 9 December 1893, deputising at outside right for the injured Jack Hallam in a home game against Burton Swifts which Small Heath won 2–0. Once Hallam regained fitness, Jackson's first-team chances were limited, and he joined Worcester club Berwick Rangers at the end of the 1893–94 season.
