= Harry Devey =

English footballer (1864–1940)

Personal information
- Full name: Henry Prince Devey
- Date of birth: 25 September 1864
- Place of birth: Birmingham, England
- Date of death: 25 April 1940 (aged 75)
- Place of death: Moseley, Birmingham, England
- Position: Centre half

Senior career*
Years	Team	Apps	(Gls)
1881–1884	Aston Clarendon		
1884–1886	Montrose (Birmingham)		
1886–1887	Birmingham Excelsior		
1887–1892	Aston Villa	73	(1)
- * Club domestic league appearances and goals

Henry Prince Devey (25 September 1864 – 25 April 1940) was an English footballer who played in the Football League for Aston Villa.

== Personal life ==
Henry Prince Devey was born in Birmingham on 25 September 1864. He came from a sporting family. His twin brother Bob played football for Aston Villa, but not in the Football League. Three nephews all played football professionally, Jack Devey for Aston Villa and England, Ted for Small Heath and Will for several Midlands-based clubs, and their brother Abel played Minor Counties cricket for Staffordshire.

Outside football, Devey worked as an electroplater. He was married with a daughter. Devey died in a nursing home in Moseley, Birmingham, on 25 April 1940 at the age of 75.

== Playing career ==
Devey played for Aston Clarendon, Montrose (Birmingham), and Birmingham Excelsior, from where he joined Aston Villa in August 1887.

=== Season 1888–89 ===
Harry Devey was a key member of the Aston Villa squad in the Football League inaugural season of 1888–89. Devey played in the first ever Villa League match on 8 September 1888 at Dudley Road, Wolverhampton then home of Wolverhampton Wanderers. The match ended 1-1. Devey was described as a keen, hard-tackler who had the ability, then rare for a defender at bringing the ball forward. He only missed one game in 1888-1889 and was part of the excellent Aston Villa defence (as Centre-Half) that only conceded 43 goals in 1888-1889 the 3rd lowest in the League in 1888–1889. As a centre-half he played in a defence that achieved one League clean-sheet and kept the opposition to one-League-goal-in-a-match on no less than on eight occasions. Aston Villa finished runners-up.

== Professional baseball ==
In 1890 Devey played professional baseball for Aston Villa in the National League of Baseball of Great Britain.

== Statistics ==
Appearances and goals by club, season and competition
Club	Season	League			FA Cup		Total	
Club	Season	Division	Apps	Goals	Apps	Goals	Apps	Goals
Aston Villa	1888–89	Football League	21	0	3	0	24	0
Aston Villa	1889–90	Football League	19	0	1	0	20	0
Aston Villa	1890–91	Football League	19	0	1	0	20	0
Aston Villa	1891–92	Football League	10	1	4	0	14	1
Aston Villa	1892–93	First Division	4	0	0	0	4	0
Aston Villa	Total		73	1	9	0	82	1
