= Josiah Roberts =

English footballer

Personal information
- Full name: Josiah Edmund Roberts
- Date of birth: 1871
- Place of birth: West Smethwick, England
- Date of death: Unknown
- Position: Right back

Senior career*
Years	Team	Apps	(Gls)
- Birmingham St George's
1892–1893	Small Heath	1	(0)
1893–1???	Walsall Wood		
- * Club domestic league appearances and goals

Josiah Edmund Roberts (1871 – after 1892) was an English footballer who played in the Football League for Small Heath. Roberts was born in West Smethwick, which was then in Staffordshire He joined Small Heath from Birmingham St George's when the latter club folded in 1892. A right back, he played only one competitive game for the club, on 5 November 1892 in a 4–1 win away at Bootle, which was the game after regular left back Fred Speller broke his leg. Roberts returned to non-league football in 1893.
