= Fred Wheldon =

English footballer and cricketer (1869–1924)

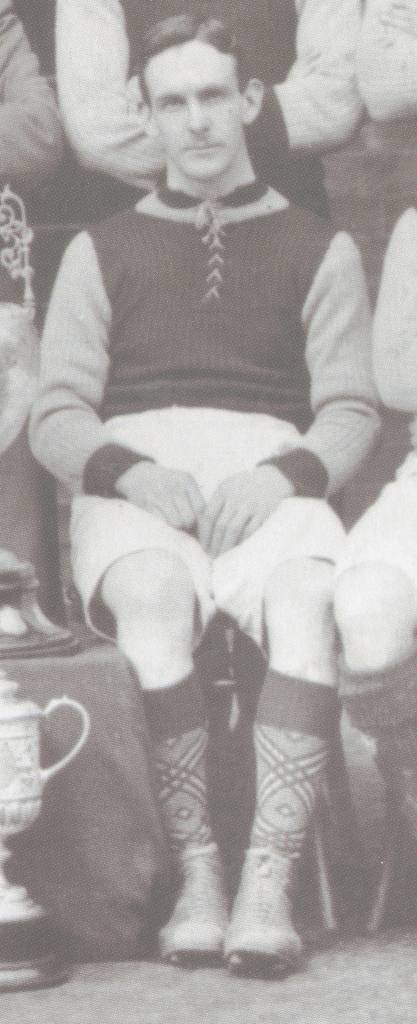
- Wheldon in Aston Villa colours in 1897

Personal information
- Full name: George Frederick Wheldon
- Date of birth: 1 November 1869
- Place of birth: Langley Green, England
- Date of death: 13 January 1924 (aged 54)
- Place of death: Worcester, England
- Height: 5 ft 8 in (1.73 m)
- Position: Inside left

Senior career*
Years	Team	Apps	(Gls)
- Rood End White Star
188?–1890	Langley Green Victoria		
1890–1896	Small Heath	155	(96)
1896–1900	Aston Villa	123	(68)
1900–1901	West Bromwich Albion	26	(3)
1901–1902	Queens Park Rangers	14	(6)
1902–1904	Portsmouth		
1904–1907	Worcester City		
Total		318	(173)

International career
1894–1898	The Football League XI	4	(4)
1897–1898	England	4	(6)
- * Club domestic league appearances and goals

George Frederick Wheldon (1 November 1869 – 13 January 1924) was an English sportsman. In football, he was an inside-forward with good footwork and an eye for goal who played for England and several Football League clubs, in particular for Small Heath and Aston Villa. He was the First Division’s top scorer in the 1897-98 season. In cricket, he was a right-handed batsman and occasional wicket-keeper, who played county cricket for Worcestershire in their early seasons in the first-class game.

After retiring from sport, he became a publican in Worcester, where he died at the age of 54.

== Personal life ==
George Frederick Wheldon was born on 1 November 1869 in Langley Green, which was then in Worcestershire. He was the youngest of ten children of Eliza and Joseph Wheldon, who worked his way up to become manager of Albright and Wilson's phosphorus works at Langley Green, and attended Chance's infant school and Langley St Michael's school. Commonly known as Fred or Freddie, he completed a seven-year engineering apprenticeship at Albright and Wilson's, and was working as a steam engine fitter before becoming a full-time professional footballer. He was twice married and had at least five children. He went into the licensed trade while still a footballer, and continued after his retirement from the game. During the First World War, he was employed in munitions work. He died at home, the Farriers Arms pub in Worcester, on 13 January 1924 at the age of 54.

== Club career ==
Wheldon played football for Oldbury-based club Rood End White Star, and by 1887 was representing his hometown club, Langley Green Victoria. A trial with West Bromwich Albion the following year came to nothing, but his performance in a January 1890 friendly match against an Aston Villa reserve team featuring Villa's new Scottish signings caused Charlie Johnstone, author of the Birmingham Daily Mail's Football Notes column to suggest that if Villa were able to train him for six months he "would probably astonish some of the slow and not over-sure forwards at present identified with their first team", and five more like him would save them the bother of going to Scotland for reinforcements at all.

=== Small Heath ===
Despite a mutual admiration between club and player, Wheldon did not join the 1888–89 Football League runners-up but instead signed for another Birmingham-based club, Small Heath of the Football Alliance. It was later reported that a business relationship between Small Heath chairman Walter W. Hart and Albright and Wilson's enabled Hart to influence Wheldon's father favourably towards his club. Signed initially on amateur forms, he made his debut on 15 February 1890, scored twice in a 6–2 defeat of Darwen, and gave Football Notes no reason to moderate their view of him as "a young player who one day will be one of the forwards of whom the district is most proud", "a born footballer [who] cannot fail to come on apace". He played once more for the first team in what remained of that season, and then turned professional. He was ever-present during the 1890–91 season, with eight goals from the 22 Alliance matches and a hat-trick against Hednesford Town in the FA Cup. Again ever-present for Small Heath in the final season of the Alliance, his 21 goals from 22 matches helped the team finish third. The club's application for election to the Football League First Division when it was expanded to 16 clubs was unsuccessful, but it was among 12 clubs, mostly from the Alliance, elected to the newly formed Second Division.

Wheldon's and Small Heath's first Football League goal opened the scoring in a 5–1 win against Burslem Port Vale, and he went on to score 25 goals from the 22 matches, finishing the season as top scorer in the division. (Note: The Rec.Sport.Soccer Statistics Foundation (RSSSF) lists Wheldon as having scored a divisional best 24 goals in the 1892–93 Second Division, but Matthews (2010) assigns him 25, as does the English National Football Archive.) The team finished top of the table, a point ahead of Sheffield United, but promotion was not automatic even for champions; they had to play a test match at a neutral venue against the First Division's bottom club, Newton Heath. Wheldon scored the equaliser and "all but scored a second" in a 1–1 draw at Stoke's Victoria Ground; in the replay, Frank Mobley put Small Heath 1–0 up and Wheldon hit a post before Newton Heath won 5–2. Wheldon's 22 league goals helped Small Heath finish as runners-up to Liverpool in 1893–94. The test match, again at Stoke, was level at 1–1 against Darwen until late goals from Billy Walton and Wheldon secured the victory and with it promotion.

In October 1894, Small Heath played West Bromwich Albion in a benefit match for Wheldon; his left-wing partner, Tommy Hands, and a triallist goalkeeper were both injured during the game, and only 2000 supporters were present. A few days later, he scored with the first penalty kick awarded to Small Heath, at home to local rivals Aston Villa, one of 11 First Division goals he scored that season. He missed a fixture for the first and what would remain only time in a six-year professional career with Small Heath, on 11 February 1895, when his sister died on the morning of a match. Having finished 12th of 16 in 1894–95, they came 15th in 1895–96 and faced the top two Second Division teams home and away in a test match mini-league. Defeats to Manchester City and Liverpool and a draw with the latter confirmed Small Heath's relegation, but in the final match, they beat Manchester City 8–0 with hat-tricks from Wheldon and Jack Jones. It was his final contribution to a tally of 113 goals from 175 matches. He refused to re-sign for Small Heath on his current terms, and the directors of what would be a Second Division club did not feel able to increase his wages.

=== Aston Villa ===
On 4 June 1896, Wheldon signed for League champions Aston Villa, reportedly the only club to meet Small Heath's valuation. The fee was initially undisclosed at the buyers' request, but was confirmed by Small Heath's chairman at the club's annual general meeting as £100 up front, £250 from the takings at a match to be played between the two clubs, and half of any excess taken over that figure. The £350 was believed to be a transfer record, and Wheldon would receive wages "considerably in advance" of the £150 a year he earned at Small Heath.

In his first season at Villa Park, Wheldon's 22 goals (18 in the First Division, 4 in the FA Cup) not only made him the team's top scorer but helped them achieve the League and Cup double. Villa beat Everton 3–2 in the 1897 FA Cup Final at the Crystal Palace, and Wheldon made the score 2–2 before Jimmy Crabtree secured a 3–2 victory. He himself kept a notebook detailing his appearances and goals, in which he recorded two goals in that final. According to the English National Football Archive (ENFA), reports of the goalscorers did vary: "Wheldon's goal is also credited to Cowan and Campbell, and Crabtree's to Wheldon or Devey." His 1897–98 season opened with two successive hat-tricks, against Sheffield Wednesday and West Bromwich Albion. He finished as the league's top scorer with 21 goals.

Wheldon, a professional cricketer with Worcestershire during the summer months, failed to report for training ahead of the 1898–99 football season. When contacted by the secretary-manager George Ramsay, he requested an extension to the end of August so that he could complete his cricket season, but was granted leave only until 20 August. He did not return, and then took part in Worcestershire's match against Surrey Second XI beginning on the 23rd, so Villa's committee suspended him sine die and requested an explanation. He expressed regret for his absence, but told them that he thought playing cricket was an adequate alternative to pre-season football training. The committee suspended him for two weeks dating from 22 August, the first training day after his leave expired, so he missed only one competitive match. He contributed 27 goals over the next two seasons to help Villa win back-to-back league titles – making three in four seasons – in 1898–99 and 1899–1900, taking his totals to 68 goals from 123 First Division matches.

=== West Bromwich Albion ===
At the end of that season, Wheldon asked Villa's permission to take a public house, the Railway Tavern at Langley Green. On principle, Aston Villa opposed any involvement by their players in the licensed trade. The club wanted to retain his services, and had offered him another year's contract on the same terms as before, but he was determined to take the pub, so he was made available for transfer, the likely purchaser being another First Division club, West Bromwich Albion. The Sports Argus wrote that the directors were correct to stick to their principles, and that "Wheldon is not the great player he once was, but he is still a useful one, and would do the Albion front line a great deal of good." In mid-June, it was reported that Villa were asking for a £300 fee, while Albion were only willing to pay £100. The deal was done a couple of weeks later, at a fee of £100, and he became the first to play professionally for all three major Birmingham-area clubs.

He was appointed captain, but two months into the season, the team were struggling and he himself had not scored, so he gave up the captaincy at his own request. His form improved when the lively James Stevenson came in from Preston North End at centre forward, but apart from a 7–2 win against Bolton Wanderers, neither his nor the team's goalscoring did, and Albion were relegated at the end of the season. He was initially placed on the retained list, but did not re-sign, and in July was listed as available for transfer.

=== Later career ===
He then joined Southern League side Queens Park Rangers for £400 in 1901 and then moved to his third club in as many years, as one of manager Bob Blyth's reinforcements at 1901–02 Southern League title-holders Portsmouth. Over the next two seasons he made 63 appearances in all competitions, and then signed as club captain of Worcester City, where he played out the rest of his career, scoring at least 39 goals in the Birmingham and District League. He retired from football, aged 37, in January 1907.

One of the select few who have won fame both at cricket and football. At one period of his long and brilliant career, Fred Wheldon's services would have been accepted by any club in the country. When at his best, he was undoubtedly the finest inside left forward England possessed. His command of the ball, his adaptability to prevailing conditions, combined with his dodging, his swerving, and his deadly shooting, made him a great player in the highest company. Brilliant with head and foot alike, he has always been an ornament to the game.

— The Villa News and Record, 1 September 1906

== International career ==
Wheldon was first selected for the Football League XI in the 1893–94 season, while still a Second Division player with Small Heath. In February 1894, he scored twice in a 4–2 win against the Irish League representative team in Belfast, and in April, England's goal in a 1–1 draw with the Scottish Football League XI at Goodison Park came from a passing move involving Wheldon, Jack Devey and goalscorer Fred Spiksley.

Wheldon won four England caps whilst at Villa, scoring six goals. He won his first England cap against Ireland at Trent Bridge, Nottingham on 20 February 1897. Wheldon netted a debut hat-trick as England cruised to a 6–0 victory. Some reports however, say Wheldon's free kick took a deflection off teammate Ernest Needham for 2-0 and also a James Barron own goal made it 4–0. He then played in two further internationals, against Ireland in Belfast, England winning 3–2, and then scored twice in a 3–0 victory against Wales in Wrexham. His last cap came against Scotland at Celtic Park, in which Steve Bloomer became England's record scorer. Wheldon scored after only 3 minutes, Bloomer then scored the other two to break the record set by Tinsley Lindley, as England won 3–1.

== Career statistics ==
Appearances and goals by club, season and competition
Club	Season	League			FA Cup		Other		Total	
Club	Season	Division	Apps	Goals	Apps	Goals	Apps	Goals	Apps	Goals
Small Heath	1889–90	Football Alliance	2	2	—		—		2	2
Small Heath	1890–91	Football Alliance	22	8	2	3	—		24	11
Small Heath	1891–92	Football Alliance	22	21	7	8	—		29	29
Small Heath	1892–93	Second Division	22	25	1	0	2 (Note: Appearance(s) in test matches)	1	25	26
Small Heath	1893–94	Second Division	28	22	1	1	1	1	30	24
Small Heath	1894–95	First Division	29	11	1	0	—		30	11
Small Heath	1895–96	First Division	30	7	1	0	4	3	35	10
Small Heath	Total		155	96	13	12	7	5	175	113
Aston Villa	1896–97	First Division	30	18	7	4	—		37	22
Aston Villa	1897–98	First Division	26	23	1	0	—		27	23
Aston Villa	1898–99	First Division	33	16	1	0	1 (Note: Appearance in Sheriff of London Charity Shield)	0	35	16
Aston Villa	1899–1900	First Division	34	11	5	2	1	0	40	13
Aston Villa	Total		123	68	14	6	2	0	139	74
West Bromwich Albion	1900–01	First Division	26	3	3	0	—		29	3
Queens Park Rangers	1901–02	Southern League Division One	14	6	0	0	11 (Note: Five appearances in Western League, six appearances and two goals in London League)	2	25	8
Career total			218	173	30	18	20	7	368	198

== Honours ==
Small Heath

- Football League Second Division: 1892–93

Aston Villa

- Football League First Division: 1896–97, 1898–99, 1899–1900
- FA Cup: 1896–97
- Sheriff of London Charity Shield (shared): 1899

Individual

- Football League First Division top scorer: 1897–98
- Football League Second Division top scorer: 1892–93

== Cricket career ==
Wheldon played cricket for Langley Green and, having impressed with both bat and ball playing against them in 1892, moved on to Dudley of the Birmingham League. He turned out for Worcestershire Club and Ground in June 1893, and became an increasingly regular selection for the full county side, contributing to the three consecutive outright Minor Counties titles that preceded their admission to the County Championship.

Wheldon played in Worcestershire's maiden first-class game, against Yorkshire in May 1899. He made a useful 49 not out in the first innings, and held two catches in Yorkshire's second. Wheldon played in 14 matches in total that season, scoring 541 runs at an average of 33.81 including three half-centuries.

The following season Wheldon had a rather thinner year, averaging under 20 despite making exactly 100 against Hampshire and in the process sharing in a sixth-wicket stand of 186 with William Lowe. 1901 was worse still, as he did not pass 51 in 26 innings, and 1902 was little better, but he returned to form at last in 1903 with 969 runs – the most of his career – including 112 against Somerset. He also collected his only first-class stumping that year, against Yorkshire: Thomas Straw had been due to keep wicket, but was delayed in arriving at the ground, so Wheldon replaced him both in the team and behind the stumps.

Wheldon passed 900 runs again in 1904; he also collected 40 catches, by far the most in a season in his career, and scored a century before lunch on the second day of the match against Leicestershire. Thereafter his form fell away rapidly, and in 1905 he recorded a disastrous aggregate of 237 runs in 18 innings, dropping out of the team in late July. He did return for 1906, but again his form was poor and though he made an unbeaten 89 batting at number nine against Warwickshire (out of 633; again Wheldon kept wicket) his next highest score was 31 and he played no more first-class cricket after the end of the season. He did appear in the Minor Counties Championship for Worcestershire Second XI in 1907 and for Carmarthenshire in 1910.

Wheldon's grandson John Spilsbury played a single first-class match for Worcestershire in 1952.

== Sources ==
- Brooke, Robert; Goodyear, David (1990). A Who's Who of Worcestershire County Cricket Club. London: Robert Hale. ISBN 978-0-7090-4023-1.
- Blakeman, Mick; Brown, Tony; Warsop, Keith, eds. (2009). The Football Alliance Match by Match: 1889/90 to 1891/92. Nottingham: SoccerData. ISBN 978-1-905891-19-1.
- Freddi, Cris (1991). The England Football Fact Book. Enfield: Guinness. p. 248. ISBN 978-0-85112-991-4.
- Goodyear, David (1992). Aston Villa: A Complete Record 1874–1992. Derby: Breedon Books. ISBN 978-1-873626-17-7.
- Hayes, Dean (1997). Portsmouth F.C. An A–Z. Seaford: S.B. Publications. ISBN 978-1-85770-148-7.
- Matthews, Tony (1996). The A–Z of West Bromwich Albion. Derby: Breedon Books. ISBN 978-1-85983-064-2.
- Matthews, Tony (2000). The Encyclopedia of Birmingham City Football Club 1875–2000. Cradley Heath: Britespot. ISBN 978-0-9539288-0-4.
- Matthews, Tony (2010). Birmingham City: The Complete Record. Derby: Derby Books. ISBN 978-1-85983-853-2.
