= Jack Hallam (footballer) =

English footballer

Personal information
- Date of birth: 26 June 1869
- Place of birth: Oswestry, Shropshire, England
- Date of death: 7 March 1949 (aged 79)
- Place of death: Swindon, Wiltshire, England
- Position: Outside right

Senior career*
Years	Team	Apps	(Gls)
1888–1890	Oswestry Town		
1890–1896	Small Heath	133	(54)
1896–1897	Swindon Town	14	(4)
1897–1898	Trowbridge Town		
1898–1899	Swindon Town	2	(0)

International career
1889	Wales	1	(0)
- * Club domestic league appearances and goals

John Hallam (26 June 1869 – 7 March 1949) was an English professional footballer who played as an outside right. He was capped at full international level for Wales. He played 133 games for Small Heath in the Football Alliance and the Football League, and also represented Oswestry Town, Swindon Town and Trowbridge Town.

== Career ==
Hallam was born in Oswestry, Shropshire, on the border with Wales, the eldest child of Lister Hallam of Hull, Yorkshire and Eliza Ann Bell of Leeds. Hallam started his football career with clubs in his native town.

While with Oswestry Town he won international honours for Wales, on 23 February 1889 in a 4–1 defeat to England. A report of the match said that Hallam "showed great speed but was evidently nervous and hesitated too much".

In 1890, he moved to Small Heath, then playing in the Football Alliance, and made more than 150 appearances for the club in all competitions. The strength of Hallam's game lay in his speed, and he formed fine partnerships on the right side with both Charlie Short and Billy Walton. In Small Heath's first Football League season, they won the inaugural Second Division championship; Hallam contributed 17 goals, and was only outscored by future England international Fred Wheldon. He also helped them to runners-up spot and promotion to the First Division the following year and played a further 18 months in the top flight.

He then moved to Swindon Town, where he played for one season in the Southern League, followed by a season with Trowbridge Town in the Western League, then returning to Swindon for a final season in their Western League team. After football, he lived in Swindon, Wiltshire, where he worked as a fitter for the Great Western Railway. He died in the town in 1949, aged 80.
