= John Spilsbury (cricketer) =

English cricketer

Personal information
- Full name: John William Edward Spilsbury
- Born: 27 October 1933; Worcester, England
- Died: 10 July 2025 (aged 91)
- Batting: Right-handed
- Bowling: Right-arm fast-medium

Domestic team information
- Years: Team
- 1952: Worcestershire

Career statistics
Competition	FC
Matches	1
Runs scored	16
Batting average	16.00
100s/50s	0/0
Top score	16
Balls bowled	90
Wickets	0
Bowling average	-
5 wickets in innings	0
10 wickets in match	0
Best bowling	-
Catches/stumpings	1/0
- Source: Cricinfo, 4 March 2009

John William Edward Spilsbury (27 October 1933 – 10 July 2025) was an English cricketer. A right-arm fast-medium bowler and right-handed batsman, he played only once at first-class level, when he appeared for Worcestershire against the Combined Services at New Road in 1952. He also played football, making 287 appearances for Worcester City F.C. during the 1950s.

He is the grandson of England footballer and fellow Worcestershire cricketer Fred Wheldon.
