= Percy Watson (English footballer) =

English footballer

Personal information
- Date of birth: March 1869
- Place of birth: Barnsley, England
- Date of death: 1949 (aged 79–80)
- Position: Left back

Senior career*
Years	Team	Apps	(Gls)
1893–1894	Rotherham Town	8	(0)
1894	Small Heath	2	(0)
–	Denaby		
- * Club domestic league appearances and goals

Percy C. Thomas Watson (March 1869 – 1949) was an English professional footballer who played in the Football League for Rotherham Town and Small Heath. Born in Barnsley, which was then in the West Riding of Yorkshire, Watson played in the Second Division for both Rotherham Town and Small Heath during the 1893–94 season.
