= William Reynolds (footballer, born 1870) =

English footballer

Personal information
- Full name: William Thomas Reynolds
- Date of birth: 1870
- Place of birth: Tewkesbury, England
- Position: Left back

Senior career*
Years	Team	Apps	(Gls)
- St Luke's
1893–1894	Small Heath	12	(0)
1894–1???	Berwick Rangers (Worcester)		
- * Club domestic league appearances and goals

William Thomas Reynolds (1870 – after 1893) was an English professional footballer who played in the Football League for Small Heath.

Reynolds was born in Tewkesbury, Gloucestershire. He joined Small Heath in April 1893, and made his debut in the Second Division on 14 October 1893 in a 4–3 home defeat to Liverpool. He was the player used most often at left back during the 1893–94 season, playing 13 games in all competitions, but was released following Small Heath's promotion as he was not thought good enough to play at a higher level.
