= Thomas Straw =

English cricketer

Thomas Straw (1 September 1870 – 8 September 1959) was an English first-class cricketer. A right-handed batsman born in Hucknall Torkard, Nottinghamshire, he kept wicket for Worcestershire County Cricket Club in their early years of first-class cricket. Straw was a lower-order batsman, with a highest score of 32 in 94 innings.

Straw made his debut on 4 May 1899 in Worcestershire's very first first-class match, against Yorkshire at New Road. He batted at number 11, making 9 and nought.

In his 13 matches during the 1899 season, Straw held 29 catches and made one stumping, the latter against Oxford University. For the next two seasons, Straw remained a regular in the Worcestershire side and recorded 90 dismissals before being replaced by George Gaukrodger in 1902. Straw returned to the side for a single game against Oxford University in 1903.

In May 1907, he made a return to the Worcestershire side against Hampshire, although only 58 overs of play were possible in the game and he did not get a mention on the scorecard. Later that same year, in August, he played four more matches, the last of these against Surrey at New Road. Straw's final victim in first-class cricket was Jack Hobbs, caught for 2 off the bowling of John Cuffe.

As of 2012, only 23 instances of a batter being dismissed for obstructing the field had been recorded in first-class cricket. Straw was dismissed in this manner twice, against Warwickshire in 1899 and 1901.

Straw died in Hucknall Torkard, Nottinghamshire, on 8 September 1959, one week after his 89th birthday.
