= Will Devey =

English footballer

Personal information
- Full name: William Devey
- Date of birth: 12 April 1865
- Place of birth: Perry Barr, Birmingham, England
- Date of death: 10 June 1935 (aged 70)
- Place of death: Birmingham, England
- Position: Centre forward

Youth career
- –: Clarendon Montrose
- –: Wellington Town

Senior career*
| Years | Team | Apps | (Gls) |
| 1884–1885 | Aston Unity | | |
| 1885–1891 | Small Heath | 40 | (35) |
| 1891–1892 | Wolverhampton Wanderers | 41 | (17) |
| 1892–1894 | Aston Villa | 10 | (2) |
| 1894–1895 | Walsall Town Swifts | 21 | (7) |
| 1895–1896 | Burton Wanderers | 22 | (7) |
| 1896–1897 | Notts County | 14 | (3) |
| 1897 | Walsall | 11 | (6) |
| 1897–1898 | Burton Wanderers | | |
| 1898 | Walsall | 0 | (0) |
| 1898 | Darlaston | | |
| 1898–1899 | Small Heath | 2 | (1) |
- * Club domestic league appearances and goals

William Devey (12 April 1865 – 10 June 1935) was an English professional footballer who played as a centre forward for Small Heath (renamed from Small Heath Aliiance in 1888) in the Football Alliance and for a variety of Midlands clubs in the Football League and outside it.

== Football career ==
He was Small Heath Alliance's leading scorer for their first two seasons in the Football Alliance (1889–90 and 1890–91) before moving to Wolverhampton Wanderers where he became their leading scorer in the next Football League season.

== Professional Baseball ==
In 1890 Devey played professional baseball for Aston Villa in the National League of Baseball of Great Britain.

== Family ==
He was one of five brothers who all played professional football, Ted and Will for Small Heath and Jack, Harry and Bob for Aston Villa. Another brother, Abel, was a cricketer with Staffordshire.

== Honours ==
Aston Villa

- National League of Baseball: 1890
