= Arthur Littleford =

English footballer

Personal information
- Full name: Arthur George Littleford
- Date of birth: 1868 (Note: Littleford's birth was registered in the Wellington, Shropshire district in q4 1868, and he was resident in and christened in Wrockwardine, Shropshire, on 18 October of that year.)
- Place of birth: Allscott, Shropshire, England
- Date of death: 1934 (aged 66)
- Place of death: Birmingham, England
- Position: Right back

Senior career*
Years	Team	Apps	(Gls)
–	South Yardley		
1893–1895	Small Heath	3	(0)
1895–1???	Berwick Rangers (Worcester)		
- * Club domestic league appearances and goals

Arthur George Littleford (1868–1934) was an English professional footballer who played in the Football League for Small Heath.

== Life and career ==
Littleford was born in Wrockwardine, Shropshire, in 1868. He played local football before joining Small Heath in 1893. A regular full back in the reserves, he played rarely and not well for the Second Division team in the 1893–94 season, though always on the winning side. He made his debut in a 2–1 home win against Middlesbrough Ironopolis on 23 December 1893. He later played for Berwick Rangers (Worcester).

Littleford's death at the age of 66 was registered in Birmingham in the third quarter of 1934.
