= Tommy Hands =

English footballer (1870-after 1900)

Personal information
- Full name: Thomas Hands
- Date of birth: 4 January 1870
- Place of birth: Birmingham, England
- Position: Outside left

Senior career*
Years	Team	Apps	(Gls)
1890–1896	Small Heath	134	(40)
1896–1900	Kings Heath		
- * Club domestic league appearances and goals

Thomas Hands (4 January 1870 – after 1900) was an English professional footballer who played as an outside left. He played 134 games for Small Heath in the Football Alliance and the Football League.

Born in Small Heath, Birmingham, Hands played for several clubs in the local area before signing for Small Heath, then playing in the Football Alliance, in December 1890. He went on to make nearly 150 appearances for the club. The strength of Hands's game lay in his speed. In Small Heath's first Football League season, in which they won the inaugural Second Division championship, he was part of a forward line who all reached double figures of goals scored. He also contributed to their runners-up spot and promotion to the First Division the following year, and played for a further two years in the top flight. At the end of the 1895–96 season, he walked out of the club over a dispute about money and never played league football again.
