= Old Hill Wanderers F.C. =

English football club

Old Hill Wanderers
- Full name: Old Hill Wanderers Football Club
- Nickname: the Toffs
- Founded: 1890
- Dissolved: 1895
- Ground: Halesowen Road
- Treasurer: Teddy Foley
- Secretary: John Pearson
Home colours

Old Hill Wanderers Football Club was an English association football club based in Old Hill in the Black Country.

== History ==
The club was formed in 1890, and, with backing from Teddy Foley (landlord of the Queen's Head on Garratt's Lane, the club's headquarters) and Albert Chapman, competed in the Birmingham & District League, one of the country's strongest semi-professional leagues, between 1892 and 1895. Bolstered by a number of old West Bromwich Albion players, including Harry Green and George Timmins (who had both been part of the 1888 FA Cup-winning side), the club won the league championship in the 1893–94 season, securing the title with a 10–0 win over Berwick Rangers while closest rivals Aston Villa Reserves could only draw with Smethwick Carriage Works.

The club also reached the fourth (and final) qualifying round of the FA Cup in 1894–95, bowing out at the Football League side Burton Wanderers.

However, the club's success proved its downfall. The loss of quality players from the 1893–94 Birmingham League-winning side, such as Alec Leake and Billy Williams to Small Heath and West Bromwich Albion respectively, and another five to the ambitious Worcester Rovers, was a major factor in the decline of the club's fortunes; the club's wages - 7/6 per match - were so low, even in its title winning season, that two players were fined for dodging train fares. Unable to match the results of the title-winning season, attendances declined and a financial loss of £200 for the 1894–95 season was reported.

Worse, the club's landlord ordered the ground to be dismantled in August 1895, "so that it now looks like the wilderness it did six years ago", and the club became homeless. The club was voted out of the Birmingham and District League at the end of the 1894–95 season, replaced by Hereford Thistle, and the club broke up before the new season started, although an Old Hill Wanderers side played a handful of friendlies in 1895–96. In March 1897, the club's long-serving secretary, John Pearson, died of typhoid; Pearson, a boot manufacturer, was 31. Foley revived the club in 1897, albeit without a home ground (borrowing that of Netherton Rovers for home games), but it did not survive the season.

== Colours ==
The club wore black and amber stripes with black shorts.

== Ground ==
The club played at the Central Ground on Halesowen Road, opposite the Pig & Whistle Inn (later the Victoria Hotel). In 1892 the club's groundsman successfully defended a claim for trespass from a chain manufacturer who claimed to have the tenancy over the ground, but Teddy Foley successfully claimed that his tenancy included the ground.

The highest crowd recorded was around 4,000 saw the Wanderers draw 3–3 with Causeway Green Villa on 24 October 1891.

== Notable players ==
- Category:Old Hill Wanderers F.C. players ( 7 )
