= William Ollis =

English footballer

Personal information
- Date of birth: 12 August 1871
- Place of birth: Birmingham, England
- Date of death: May 1940 (aged 68)
- Place of death: Birmingham, England
- Position: Right half

Youth career
- Newall Juniors
- Southfield

Senior career*
Years	Team	Apps	(Gls)
18??–1891	Warwick County		
1891–1896	Small Heath	121	(2)
1896–1899	Hereford Thistle		
- * Club domestic league appearances and goals

William Ollis (12 August 1871 – May 1940) was an English professional footballer who played as a right half. Born in Bordesley Green, Birmingham, Ollis played 121 games in the Football Alliance and the Football League for Small Heath. He was part of the team which won the inaugural Second Division championship in 1892–93 and gained promotion to the First Division via the Test Match system the following season. He also played for Warwick County and Hereford Thistle. He died in Birmingham at the age of 68.

== Honours ==
Small Heath

- Football League Second Division: 1892–93
- Second Division: runners-up 1893–94
