= George Hollis (footballer) =

English footballer

Personal information
- Date of birth: 1869
- Place of birth: Kenilworth, England
- Date of death: Unknown
- Position: Goalkeeper

Senior career*
| Years | Team | Apps | (Gls) |
| 1891–1894 | Small Heath | 48 | (0) |
| 1894–1897 | Bournbrook | | |
- * Club domestic league appearances and goals

George Hollis (1869 – after 1897) was an English professional footballer who played as a goalkeeper.

Born in Kenilworth, Warwickshire, Hollis deputised as Small Heath's goalkeeper for England international Chris Charsley, an amateur whose career in the Birmingham City Police entailed his frequent absence from footballing duties. He made 49 appearances in all senior competitions, including 17 in Small Heath's last season in the Football Alliance and 31 in their first two seasons in the Football League. In 1894, Hollis's amateur status was reinstated and he joined Bournbrook F.C., retiring from the game in 1897.

== Honours ==
with Small Heath

- Football League Second Division winners: 1892–93
- Football League Second Division runners-up: 1893–94
