= Football League test matches =

- Organising body: The Football League
- Founded: 1893
- Abolished: 1898
- Region: England
- Number of teams: 6 (1893–95); 4 (1896–98)

Football League test matches were a series of post-season football play-off matches organised by the Football League, to determine the membership of each division, between the worst finishers of the First Division and the best of the Second Division. They were first contested at the end of the 1892–93 season, following the inaugural season of the Second Division, and were replaced with automatic promotion and relegation from 1898–99.

Unlike the modern-day English Football League play-offs, which is only contested between the four teams below the automatic promotion places in each division, test matches involved the bottom teams of the First Division and the top teams of the Second Division going head-to-head. This meant that the Second Division champions were not guaranteed top-flight football, as was the case with Small Heath in 1893. On no occasion has all of the Second Division and First Division sides been either respectively promoted and relegated or remained in the same division in any season through this system.

From 1893 to 1895, six teams competed for three places in the top division. Each team played one match against the corresponding team from the other division (Second Division champions versus the bottom First Division side, and so on) at a neutral venue, usually close to the designated home team. The winners of each game were considered for election for First Division membership for the following season, whilst the losers were invited to the Second Division.

From 1896 until 1898, the series was revamped with into a mini league format, with four teams competing for two First Division places. The Second Division sides played both First Division teams on a home-and-away basis. When the proceedings have concluded, the top two finishers were elected into the First Division and the bottom two were invited to the Second Division for the following season. As the 1898–99 First Division was expanded to include two more teams, the 1898 test match series was ultimately a dead rubber as all four competing teams were elected into the top tier.

== List of test matches ==
=== 1893 ===
22 April 1893

Small Heath ^{D2 1st}	1–1	^{D1 16th} Newton Heath

Victoria Ground
Attendance: 4,000
27 April 1893 (replay)

Newton Heath ^{D1 16th}	5–2	^{D2 1st} Small Heath

Olive Grove
Attendance: 6,000

Newton Heath remain in the First Division, Small Heath remain in the Second Division.

22 April 1893

Darwen ^{D2 3rd}	3–2	^{D1 14th} Notts County

Hyde Road
Attendance: 5,000

Darwen elected to the First Division, Notts County invited to the Second Division.

22 April 1893

Sheffield United ^{D2 2nd}	1–0	^{D1 15th} Accrington

Castle Ground
Attendance: 6,000

Sheffield United elected to the First Division, Accrington invited to the Second Division.

=== 1894 ===
28 April 1894

Liverpool ^{D2 1st}	2–0	^{D1 16th} Newton Heath

Ewood Park
Attendance: 5,000

Liverpool elected to the First Division, Newton Heath invited to the Second Division.

28 April 1894

Small Heath ^{D2 2nd}	3–1	^{D1 15th} Darwen

Victoria Ground
Attendance: 3,000

Small Heath elected to the First Division, Darwen invited to the Second Division.

28 April 1894

Preston North End ^{D1 14th}	4–0	^{D2 3rd} Notts County

Olive Grove
Attendance: 8,000

Preston North End remain in the First Division, Notts County remain in the Second Division.

=== 1895 ===
27 April 1895

Bury ^{D2 1st}	1–0	^{D1 16th} Liverpool

Ewood Park
Attendance: 5,000

Bury elected to the First Division, Liverpool invited to the Second Division.

27 April 1895

Derby County ^{D1 15th}	2–1	^{D2 2nd} Notts County

Filbert Street
Attendance: 8,000

Derby County remain in the First Division, Notts County remain in the Second Division.

27 April 1895

Stoke ^{D1 14th}	3–0	^{D2 3rd} Newton Heath

Athletic Ground
Attendance: 10,000

Stoke remain in the First Division, Newton Heath remain in the Second Division.

=== 1896 ===
18 April 1896

Liverpool ^{D2 1st}	4–0	^{D1 15th} Small Heath

18 April 1896

Manchester City ^{D2 2nd}	1–1	^{D1 16th} West Bromwich Albion

20 April 1896

Small Heath ^{D1 15th}	0–0	^{D2 1st} Liverpool

20 April 1896

West Bromwich Albion ^{D1 16th}	6–1	^{D2 2nd} Manchester City

25 April 1896

Liverpool ^{D2 1st}	2–0	^{D1 16th} West Bromwich Albion

25 April 1896

Manchester City ^{D2 2nd}	3–0	^{D1 15th} Small Heath

27 April 1896

West Bromwich Albion ^{D1 16th}	2–0	^{D2 1st} Liverpool

27 April 1896

Small Heath ^{D1 15th}	8–0	^{D2 2nd} Manchester City

==== Table ====
Pos.	Team	Pld.	W	D	L	F	A	Pts.
1	**Liverpool**	4	2	1	1	6	2	5
2	West Bromwich Albion	4	2	1	1	9	4	5
3	Small Heath	4	1	1	2	8	7	3
4	Manchester City	4	1	1	2	5	15	3

Key	Note
**Bold**	Second Division champions
Italic	Second Division team
	Elected to play in the First Division
	Invited to play in the Second Division

=== 1897 ===
17 April 1897

Notts County ^{D2 1st}	1–0	^{D1 15th} Sunderland

19 April 1897

Burnley ^{D1 16th}	2–0	^{D2 2nd} Newton Heath

19 April 1897

Sunderland ^{D1 15th}	0–0	^{D2 1st} Notts County

21 April 1897

Newton Heath ^{D2 2nd}	2–0	^{D1 16th} Burnley

24 April 1897

Burnley ^{D1 16th}	0–1	^{D2 1st} Notts County

24 April 1897

Newton Heath ^{D2 2nd}	1–1	^{D1 15th} Sunderland

26 April 1897

Notts County ^{D2 1st}	1–1	^{D1 16th} Burnley

26 April 1897

Sunderland ^{D1 15th}	2–0	^{D2 2nd} Newton Heath

==== Table ====
Pos.	Team	Pld.	W	D	L	F	A	Pts.
1	**Notts County**	4	2	2	0	3	1	6
2	Sunderland	4	1	2	1	3	2	4
3	Burnley	4	1	1	2	3	4	3
4	Newton Heath	4	1	1	2	3	5	3

Key	Note
**Bold**	Second Division champions
Italic	Second Division team
	Elected to play in the First Division
	Invited to play in the Second Division

=== 1898 ===
20 April 1898

Newcastle United ^{D2 2nd}	2–1	^{D1 16th} Stoke

21 April 1898

Blackburn Rovers ^{D1 15th}	1–3	^{D2 1st} Burnley

23 April 1898

Stoke ^{D1 16th}	1–0	^{D2 2nd} Newcastle United

23 April 1898

Burnley ^{D2 1st}	2–0	^{D1 15th} Blackburn Rovers

26 April 1898

Burnley ^{D2 1st}	0–2	^{D1 16th} Stoke

28 April 1898

Blackburn Rovers ^{D1 15th}	4–3	^{D2 2nd} Newcastle United

30 April 1898

Stoke ^{D1 16th}	0–0	^{D2 1st} Burnley

30 April 1898

Newcastle United ^{D2 2nd}	4–0	^{D1 15th} Blackburn Rovers

==== Table ====
Pos.	Team	Pld.	W	D	L	F	A	Pts.
1	Stoke	4	2	1	1	4	2	5
2	**Burnley**	4	2	1	1	5	3	5
3	Newcastle United	4	2	0	2	9	6	4
4	Blackburn Rovers	4	1	0	3	5	12	2

Key	Note
**Bold**	Second Division champions
Italic	Second Division team
	Elected to play in the First Division

All teams were elected to the 1898–99 Football League First Division as the league was expanded by two teams.

== See also ==
- English Football League play-offs

== Notes ==
1. Accrington subsequently resigned from the Football League
