= Bernard Pumfrey =

English footballer (1873–1930)

Personal information
- Full name: Bernard Pumfrey
- Date of birth: May 1873
- Place of birth: Birmingham, England
- Date of death: 18 July 1930 (aged 57)
- Place of death: Gainsborough, England
- Position: Full back

Senior career*
Years	Team	Apps	(Gls)
- Birmingham St Mark's
1892–1894	Small Heath (Note: The Matthews source misattributes to Bill Purves a League appearance made by Pumfrey on 30 December 1893, some time before Purves joined Small Heath.)	12	(1)
1894–1901	Gainsborough Trinity (Note: Pumfrey's Gainsborough Trinity statistics cover the Football League period only.)	121	(1)
- * Club domestic league appearances and goals

Bernard Pumfrey (May 1873 – 18 July 1930) was an English professional footballer who made 133 appearances in the Football League playing for Small Heath and Gainsborough Trinity. He played as a full back.

== Life and career ==
Pumfrey was born in the Stirchley district of Birmingham to Alfred, a carpenter and joiner, and his wife Sarah. He worked in the family business and played recreational football for Birmingham St Mark's before joining Small Heath prior to their first season in the Football League. He made his debut on 12 November 1892, in a 3–2 home win against Burton Swifts, and played in the test matches which deprived Small Heath of promotion to add to their Second Division title, but after a few more games the following season, he left for Midland League club Gainsborough Trinity in 1894.

Pumfrey contributed to Gainsborough's runners-up spot in the Midland League in the 1895–96 season which led to their election to the Football League. In five seasons in the Football League, he played 121 games and captained the team.

While a Gainsborough player Pumfrey started a joinery business in the town; he developed this into a large building contractors which was still in existence a hundred years later. He married Jennie Clarke in March 1900, and died in Gainsborough, Lincolnshire, in 1930 at the age of 57.

His older brother Harry, also a carpenter, who had studied at Birmingham School of Art, was responsible for the design of Birmingham F.C.'s new ground, St Andrew's, which opened in 1906.
