= Ted Devey =

English footballer

Personal information
- Full name: Edwin James Devey
- Date of birth: 19 March 1871
- Place of birth: Aston, England
- Date of death: 2 September 1945 (aged 74)
- Place of death: Birmingham, England
- Position: Left half

Senior career*
Years	Team	Apps	(Gls)
- Birmingham Excelsior
1888–1896	Small Heath	138	(5)
1896–????	Burton Wanderers		
- * Club domestic league appearances and goals

Edwin James Devey (19 March 1871 – 2 September 1945) was an English professional footballer who played as a left half.

== Life and career ==
Born in Aston, which was then in Warwickshire, Devey played for Birmingham Excelsior before signing for Small Heath in 1888. A defensive wing half with strong tackling, he went on to make 155 appearances in the FA Cup, Football Alliance and Football League for the club in the early days of its history. He helped the club win the inaugural Second Division championship in 1892–93 and promotion to the First Division the following year. In 1896 he moved to Burton Wanderers; playing against them in the 1887–88 FA Cup, he had scored four goals in Small Heath's 9–0 win.

Devey came from a footballing family; brother Will played for Small Heath and several other Midlands clubs, and other brothers Jack, Harry and Bob also played for Aston Villa. Another brother, Abel, was a cricketer with Staffordshire.

The 1939 Register lists Devey working as a diesinker and toolmaker and living with his wife, Florence, in the Handsworth area of Birmingham. Devey died in Birmingham in September 1945 at the age of 74.
