= Billy Walton =

English footballer

Personal information
- Date of birth: 6 August 1871
- Place of birth: Hockley Brook, Birmingham, England
- Date of death: 10 February 1963 (aged 91)
- Place of death: Winson Green, Birmingham, England
- Positions: Inside forward; wing half

Senior career*
Years	Team	Apps	(Gls)
18??–1888	Hockley Belmont		
1888–1902	Small Heath	201	(56)
1903	Dudley Town		
- * Club domestic league appearances and goals

William Howard T. Walton (6 August 1871 – 10 February 1963) was an English footballer who played for Small Heath (now Birmingham City) for fourteen years. He made 232 appearances and scored 70 goals in all competitions.

== Biography ==
Walton was born in Hockley Brook, Birmingham. He followed Small Heath from a young age; as a 14-year-old he watched the then Small Heath Alliance outclassed 4–0 by West Bromwich Albion in the semi-final of the 1885–86 FA Cup. On leaving school he trained to be a silversmith in the Hockley area of Birmingham now known as the Jewellery Quarter, and remained employed in that trade while playing football part-time.

In his younger days he played at inside forward. He was skilful on the ball with good movement and shooting ability. In Small Heath's first season in the Second Division, 1892–93, the front three of Walton, Frank Mobley and Fred Wheldon scored over 50 goals between them in a 22-game season; the following season the same trio scored 62 goals in the 28 games, Walton contributing 16 in 20. Later in his career he moved back to wing half, where his tireless encouragement of the younger players earned him the nickname "Mother".

Walton's support for Birmingham was lifelong. He was a guest of the club for the official opening of the St Andrew's ground on Boxing Day 1906, and helped clear snow from pitch and terraces so that the match could go ahead. He attended both of the FA Cup Finals involving Birmingham, in 1931 and 1956, and visited St Andrew's regularly until not long before his death.

He died in Dudley Road Hospital, Winson Green, Birmingham, at the age of 91.

== Honours ==
- Small Heath
  - Football League Second Division champions: 1892–93 (Note: Promotion was decided by test matches, in which the bottom club in the First Division played off against the top club from the Second Division, in one-off games at neutral venues, the winners to play in the following season's First Division. Small Heath drew 1–1 with Newton Heath but lost the replay 5–2, so were not promoted despite winning the division.)
  - Football League Second Division runners-up and promotion: 1893–94, 1900–01
