= Tom Bayley (footballer, born 1868) =

English footballer

Personal information
- Full name: John Thomas Bayley
- Date of birth: August 1868
- Place of birth: Walsall, England
- Date of death: Unknown
- Position: Right back

Senior career*
Years	Team	Apps	(Gls)
1887–1889	Walsall Swifts		
1889–1890	Walsall Town Swifts		
1890–1893	Small Heath	60	(0)
1893–1895	Walsall Town Swifts	23	(0)
1895–1899	Gainsborough Trinity	89	(1)
1899	South Shields		
1899–1900	Watford	4	(0)
1900	Leamington Town		
- * Club domestic league appearances and goals

John Thomas Bayley (August 1868 – after 1899), generally known as Tom Bayley, was an English professional footballer who played as a right back. Born in Walsall, Staffordshire, he played for Walsall Town Swifts and Small Heath in the Football Alliance before going on to make 130 appearances in the Football League representing Small Heath, Walsall Town Swifts and Gainsborough Trinity. He later played for South Shields, Southern League club Watford, and Leamington Town.
