= Caesar Jenkyns =

Welsh footballer

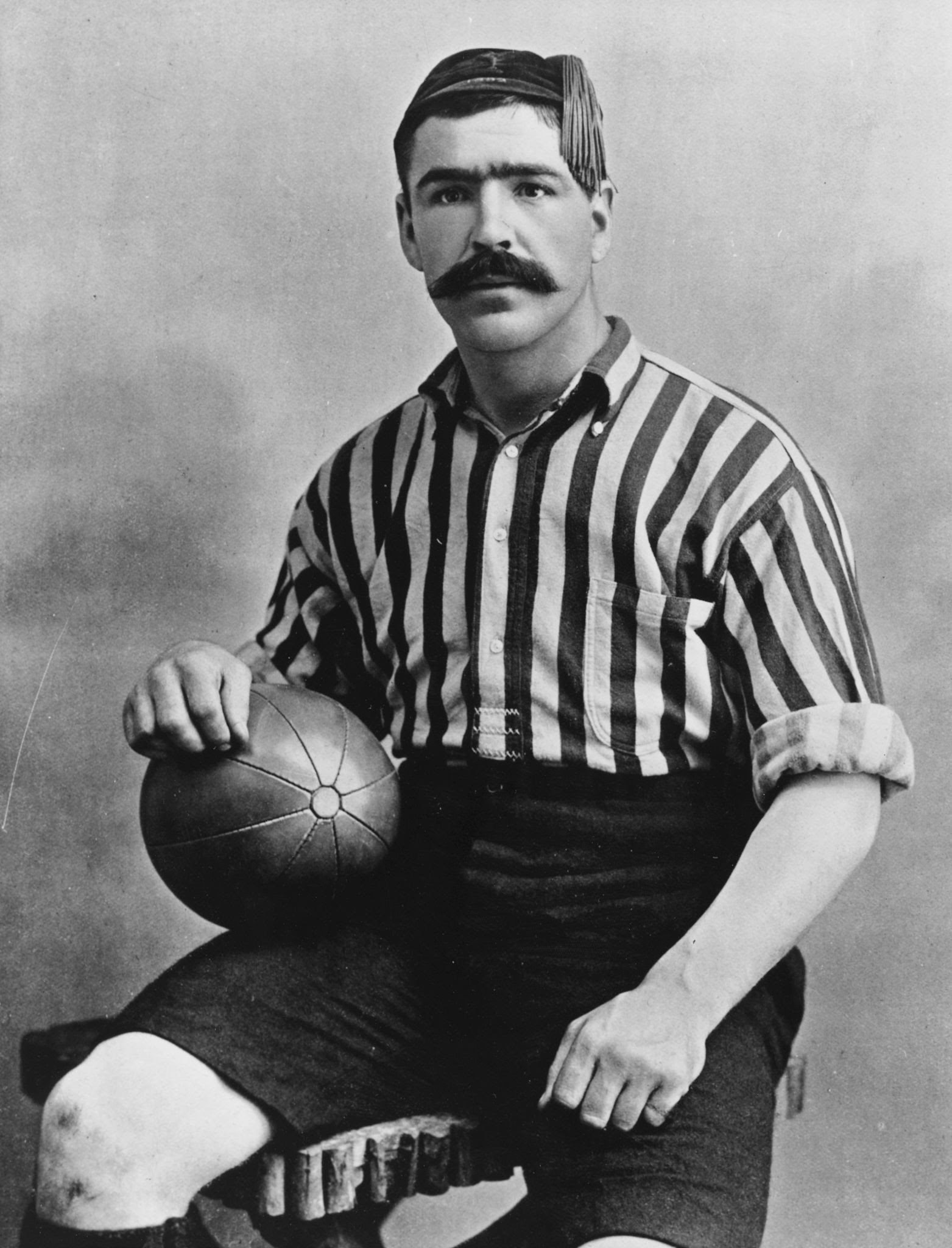
- Jenkyns in 1895–96 Arsenal kit

Personal information
- Full name: Caesar Augustus Llewellyn Jenkyns
- Date of birth: 24 August 1866
- Place of birth: Boughrood, Wales
- Date of death: 23 July 1941 (aged 74)
- Place of death: Birmingham, England
- Position: Centre half

Senior career*
Years	Team	Apps	(Gls)
- Builth
- Small Heath St. Andrews
- Walsall Swifts
- Unity Gas
1888–1895	Small Heath	75	(11)
1895–1896	Woolwich Arsenal	27	(6)
1896–1897	Newton Heath	35	(5)
1897–1902	Walsall	80	(2)
1902–1903	Coventry City		
1903–1904	Unity Gas		
1904–1905	Saltney Wednesday		

International career
1892–1898	Wales	8	(1)
- * Club domestic league appearances and goals

Caesar Augustus Llewellyn Jenkyns (24 August 1866 – 23 July 1941) was a Welsh international footballer who played in the Football League for Small Heath, Woolwich Arsenal, Newton Heath and Walsall.

== Playing career ==
Born in Boughrood (Welsh: Bochrwyd) near Builth Wells (Welsh: Llanfair-ym-Muallt), Jenkyns played for a number of English clubs, as well as winning eight caps for Wales.

Because of his build and rugged playing style he acquired nicknames such as 'Jumbo', 'The Mighty Caesar' and 'The Bastard of Builth'.

After playing for several amateur sides in the Birmingham area, Jenkyns joined Small Heath (later renamed Birmingham) in 1888, despite aggressive interest from Aston Villa, who were looking to poach players from Unity Gas and Aston Shakespeare, which Jenkyns even more aggressively rebuffed. Jenkyns was at Small Heath as they first joined the Football Alliance in 1889 and then became founder members of the Football League Second Division in 1892. By now he had made his debut for Wales and was club captain; he skippered Small Heath to promotion to the First Division in 1894, beating Darwen 3–1 in a test match.

Known as one of the most rugged defenders of his era, he was sent off four times while playing for Small Heath and that at a time when such occurrences were extremely rare. His career at Small Heath ended in March 1895 when he was released after an incident at Derby where, after being ordered from the field, he attempted to assault two spectators. Jenkyns moved to London in April 1895, joining Woolwich Arsenal, who had joined the Second Division less than two years ago. He was immediately made Arsenal captain, and made his mark in Arsenal history by becoming the club's first ever international player, after winning a cap for Wales against Scotland on 21 March 1896.

Playing at centre-half (which in those days was a midfield position), Jenkyns scored six times in 27 matches for Arsenal and was regarded by the club as one of their star players. However, his stay at the Gunners did not last long; in the summer of 1896 he moved to Newton Heath (who later became Manchester United). Jenkyns made his debut for the club on 1 September 1896 against Gainsborough Trinity. He spent two seasons with the Manchester club, taking over as captain from James McNaught, helping them to runners-up position in the Second Division in 1897. In November 1897, he left the club for Walsall, where he spent five years before joining Coventry City.

After retirement, Jenkyns ran a public house in Moxley, The George Inn, before joining the police force.

=== International career ===
Jenkyns was first selected for Wales in 1892 to face Ireland at Penrhyn Park in Bangor and retained his place to face Scotland and England. When he faced Scotland at Dundee in 1896 he became Arsenal's first ever international player. Jenkyns scored his only international goal against Ireland at Solitude, Belfast in a 4-3 defeat In his eight Wales caps, Jenkyns was never on the winning side. He only received his Wales cap in November 1933, aged 77, when the FAW was notified that he had not received anything for his national service.

== Career statistics ==
=== International ===
Appearances and goals by national team, year and competition
Team	Year	Competitive		Friendly		Total	
Team	Year	Apps	Goals	Apps	Goals	Apps	Goals
Wales	1892	3 (Note: Appearances in the 1891–92 British Home Championship)	0	0	0	3	0
Wales	1895	1 (Note: Appearance in the 1894–95 British Home Championship)	0	0	0	1	0
Wales	1896	1 (Note: Appearance in the 1895–96 British Home Championship)	0	0	0	1	0
Wales	1897	1 (Note: Appearance in the 1896–97 British Home Championship)	1	0	0	1	1
Wales	1898	2 (Note: Appearances in the 1897–98 British Home Championship)	0	0	0	2	0
Career total		8	1	0	0	8	1

Notes

Sporting positions
Preceded by James McNaught	Newton Heath captain 1896–1897	Succeeded by Harry Stafford
