= Frank Mobley =

English footballer

Personal information
- Full name: Frank Mobley
- Date of birth: 21 November 1868
- Place of birth: Birmingham, England
- Date of death: 9 February 1956 (aged 87)
- Height: 5 ft 8 in (1.73 m)
- Position: Centre forward

Senior career*
Years	Team	Apps	(Gls)
- Hockley Belmont
- Cape Hill
1886–1892	Singers		
1892–1896	Small Heath	96	(62)
1896–????	Bury	3	(0)
- Gravesend United
1900–1902	Coventry City		
- * Club domestic league appearances and goals

Frank Mobley (21 November 1868 – 9 February 1956) was an English professional footballer who played as a centre forward. He played in the Football League for Small Heath and Bury.

For Small Heath, Mobley scored 64 goals in 103 appearances in all competitions, and was leading scorer in three successive seasons, from 1893–94 – when he was also overall top scorer in the Second Division – to 1895–96. In a 1950 interview, he told the Sports Argus that he "could have got a few more if [he'd] been as selfish as some of the present-day forwards who seem to want to do all the scoring."

The 1939 Register lists Mobley as living in retirement with his son, also named Frank, and his family in the Five Ways district of Birmingham. Mobley died in Birmingham in 1956 at the age of 87.

== Honours ==
Small Heath

- Second Division champions: 1892–93 (Note: Promotion and relegation was decided by test matches, in which the bottom club in the First Division played off against the top club from the Second Division for the right to play in the First Division. Small Heath lost the test match, so were not promoted despite winning the division.)
- Second Division runners-up and promotion: 1893–94
- Second Division top scorer: 1893–94
