= 1897–98 Small Heath F.C. season =

Small Heath F.C.
1897–98 season
- Chairman: Walter W. Hart
- Secretary: Alfred Jones
- Ground: Coventry Road
- Football League Second Division: 6th (of 16)
- FA Cup: Third qualifying round (eliminated by Burslem Port Vale)
- Birmingham Senior Cup: Second round (eliminated by Walsall)
- Birmingham Charity Cup: First round (eliminated by West Bromwich Albion)
- Staffordshire Senior Cup: Semi-final (eliminated by West Bromwich Albion)
- Top goalscorer: League: Walter Abbott (19); All: Walter Abbott (19)
- Highest home attendance: 12,000 vs Burnley (8 January 1898)
- Lowest home attendance: 3,000 (three matches)
Team colours

The 1897–98 Football League season was the 17th season of competitive association football and 6th season in the Football League played by Small Heath Football Club, an English football club based in Birmingham. They finished in sixth place in the 16-team division. Having failed to gain exemption from the qualifying rounds of the 1897–98 FA Cup, they entered the competition in the third qualifying round and lost that opening match to Burslem Port Vale. In local cup competitions, they lost to Walsall in the second round of the Birmingham Cup, were eliminated by West Bromwich Albion in the first round of the Mayor of Birmingham's Charity Cup, and reached the semi-final of the Staffordshire Senior Cup where they again lost to West Bromwich Albion.

Nineteen different players represented the club in nationally organised competitive matches during the season and there were thirteen different goalscorers. Walter Abbott was the top scorer with 19 goals, and he and wing half Thomas Dunlop played in every match. The match against Burnley attracted a crowd of 12,000, an improvement on the highest attendance in the previous two seasons.

== Background ==
Looking back at the 1896–97 season, the Sports Argus' editorial expressed disappointment with the team's performance and dissatisfaction with the running of the club. At the start of the season, they had "confidently looked forward" to Small Heath reaching the test match positions, even if they proved unsuccessful therein. But the team's fine finish to the season on top of such a poor start made it "terribly aggravating to think that the least bit of extra effort earlier on in the season would in all probability have seen them a good second to [Notts] County." The club's failure to gain exemption from the qualifying competition of the FA Cup strengthened the writer's belief that "the club wants a thorough wakening-up". The club made a loss of £369 on the year, which the Dart suggested was due less to the effects of bad weather, as claimed in the annual report, than to a "penny wise and pound foolish" approach to the signing of players which they hoped would not be repeated in the season to come.

Aston Villa's old grandstand in place as a terrace cover at the Muntz Street end of the Coventry Road ground

Few players left during the close season. The ambitious and well-funded Bristol City, newly elected to the Southern League, signed both Tom Farnall and the promising Jack Jones on attractive terms, reported as £5 to sign, then 50s. during the playing season and 30s. in the summer. Had swift action not been taken by club officials, Walter Abbott would have made the same move. Charlie Izon left for Walsall, and Denny Hodgetts, who had been reinstated as an amateur, offered his services, but "as he could not promise to play for them regularly", his offer was declined.

The Dart's initial opinion was that the standard of replacement for Hodgetts, Jones and Farnall – "two or three players who have done well with local clubs have been signed up, and a smart left-wing forward in Kirton, of Lincoln City, has also been secured" – but as the directors preferred to spend their money on ground improvements, in the shape of the purchase of Aston Villa's old stands from the Perry Barr ground, rather than on "stars", these would be inadequate to return the club to the First Division. Having seen the new additions, they changed their mind. Although Hodgetts would be missed, Jack Kirton "appears to be a smart player, while the other new men secured are far from being 'duffers'", Billy Walton had recovered from the broken shoulderblade sustained the previous March, and apart from Jones and Farnall, "the whole of the other first team players from last season have signed again, and there is no reason why the Heathens should not render a good account of themselves" this season. Furthermore, "the Small Heath ground presents quite an imposing appearance now that it is adorned with the old Perry Barr grand stand, and as there is now plenty of covered accommodation for spectators the 'gates' should materially increase", and, as was pointed out later in the season, facilities for representatives of the press had also been improved.

There were no changes to the team's kit of light blue shirts with navy collar trim, cuffs and pocket, white knickerbockers and navy socks.

== Review ==
=== September–October ===
Small Heath prepared for the new season with a friendly match at Coventry Road against a Burton Wanderers team made up largely of local youngsters. In front of only a couple of hundred spectators in "pelting" rain, Walter Abbott, Charlie Hare, and Wilson Lewis scored in a 3–1 win. The first League game took place a few days later at Wanderers' neighbours Burton Swifts. Fielding three debutants, Small Heath took a one-goal lead in the first half, then took advantage of the wind at their backs after the interval to extend their lead to three goals before Swifts scored a late consolation. The Standard thought the team "unfortunate in scoring only two goals" in the first half, and two from Abbott in the second gave them a 4–0 victory in a friendly against Lincoln City At home to Leicester Fosse, in "delightful" weather in front of an 8,000 crowd, Hare scored the second-half winner after Fosse's Harry Smith had a goal disallowed for offside. The Leicester Chronicle felt that the Heathens' first goal "ought never to have been allowed in consequence of unfair charging", that there was nothing wrong with Smith's disallowed header, and that "Small Heath got the better of each decision".

The visit to West Bromwich Albion in the first round of the Mayor of Birmingham's Charity Cup gave the 2,000 spectators more goals than they might have expected. Small Heath led 3–1 at the interval, but the home side brought the scores level after 90 minutes, and scored three times more during extra time to win the tie 7–4. Back in the League, Small Heath secured a "deserved" victory at Loughborough by two Billy Walton goals to nil. The highlight of the first ten minutes was the goalkeeping of Loughborough's Godfrey Beardsley, who "repulsed shot after shot", yet Walton's two scoring shots were "weak, and the second was disputed". The home side lost Arthur Shaw through injury after only a few minutes. The win completed a sequence of nine away wins in the league, begun in January, which (as of May 2015) remains a club record. Small Heath finished September with a fourth consecutive League win. Hare scored twice in the first half, either side of Tom Leigh's goal for Burton Swifts, but despite "press[ing] incessantly" in the second half, were unable to increase their lead. The Owl commented favourably on a positive start to the season, the form of Charlie Hare and the ability of full-back Arthur Archer, but warned they needed to beat the likes of Manchester City and Burnley before starting to think about promotion.

Walton's second-half equaliser from a corner earned Small Heath a draw at Darwen, where the Owl suggested they needed "a little more dash and go in front of goal". At home to Gainsborough Trinity on the Tuesday, they led 4–3 at the interval, despite losing Jimmy Inglis to injury, and that was the final score. The Dart reported that "the attendances at Coventry Road this season have been most satisfactory, and the directors of the club are on the very best of terms with themselves as a consequence." The visit to Blackpool, who before the game had won only once this season, produced a first defeat, and an unexpectedly heavy one, for Small Heath, who showed "neither dash nor combination" as Hare scored their only goal in reply to the home side's four. Without both Hare and Inglis for the opening round of the Staffordshire Senior Cup, Small Heath nevertheless beat a full Wolverhampton Wanderers first team by three goals to two, Wilson Lewis scoring twice. The Owl's 'Captain Forward' reiterated his praise of Archer, as "one of the best defenders the Club has ever had, [who] on this occasion was on splendid form."

Despite still being unable to field a full-strength team, and with players in unaccustomed positions, Small Heath's winning ways continued at home to Newton Heath. A crowd of 6,000 saw Lewis open the scoring with a tap-in after an earlier goal had been disallowed for offside, then William Bryant tied the scores just before half-time. Soon after the interval, Lewis "whizzed" a second goal into the net, and Abbott hit the post, before Bob Donaldson's apparent equaliser was disallowed, again for offside. The Small Heath club had complained bitterly about their failure to be awarded exemption from the qualification process for the 1897–98 FA Cup, particularly as their less successful neighbours Walsall were exempted. Drawn to visit Burslem Port Vale in the third qualifying round, the club's directors made a "tempting" but unsuccessful offer to the host club to switch the venue to Coventry Road. In a result that "could scarcely be credited in Birmingham until the evening papers confirmed it", Port Vale won by two goals to one. Off the field, the club announced that the local schools league were to be allowed to play matches at the Coventry Road ground before their own fixtures.

=== November–December ===
As expected, Small Heath beat Loughborough, but "a much more decisive defeat was anticipated" by the Leicester Chronicle than Abbott's single first-half goal. Loughborough's goalkeeper, Albert Mumford, produced a "grand exhibition", In the second half, Small Heath "did the bulk of the pressing", but their shooting was "of indifferent character". Away to Grimsby Town, Small Heath's passing style was hindered by the greasy surface, and the home team took a three-goal lead before losing a player to injury. Wallace scored a late consolation.

On the day scheduled for the fourth qualifying round of the FA Cup, Small Heath beat Notts County 3–2 in a friendly. They finished November with a visit to Newcastle United watched by around 14,000 spectators. After a fast-paced first half, Newcastle led 4–0. The pace slowed in the second half, but there was no more scoring.

Home and away meetings with Walsall followed. On an unpleasantly cold dull day, the game at Coventry Road was one-sided. Despite the presence of former Small Heath captain Caesar Jenkyns in the visitors' defence, Walsall conceded three in each half. The reverse fixture was a much closer affair. Lewis scored twice for Small Heath in the first half, and Johnson replied with a header. After the interval, Walsall pressed persistently, but "the fine display of [Henry] Clutterbuck was the saving of the visitors". A 6–1 friendly defeat of Wellingborough preceded a Christmas Day defeat of Darwen by five goals to one on an icy pitch, Walter Abbott contributing a hat-trick. The victory took Small Heath into fourth place in the table, just one point behind their opponents in the last match of the year, second-placed Manchester City. The Manchester Guardian suggested that in the second half of a game "brimful of excitement", Small Heath "played in a manner richly deserving success", but lost by a single goal. The Dart described the encounter as "one of the best seen on the ground for many seasons".

=== January–February ===
A friendly away at Aston Villa on New Year's Day was abandoned because of fog, with Villa 4–0 ahead. The Dart was unimpressed with the play, which "served to prove ... that Small Heath are a long way off First Division form". The first visitors of the new year were division leaders Burnley, who attracted an attendance of some 12,000, a figure reportedly boosted by the railway companies' failure to put on a special train for Aston Villa's top-of-the-table visit to Sheffield United in the First Division. Although Small Heath led twice, first through Alec Leake and early in the second half via a Walter Abbott goal, the Owl thought them fortunate to secure a draw against a "smart, but rather rough" Burnley side "altogether superior in both attack and defence" who "fairly revelled in the mud". Away to Lincoln City, Abbott gave Small Heath a two-goal lead in the first half. The home team pulled a goal back, but the Heathens held on for their expected victory.

After only two appearances, Alec Wallace was transferred to Birmingham & District League club Hereford Town. The Dart thought Small Heath were unlucky to lose to West Bromwich Albion in the semi-final of the Staffordshire Cup, as "they had much more of the actual play than their opponents", and that if they played as well at home to Blackpool, they could expect to win. At half time, this expectation looked justified, as they led 2–1 with goals from Lewis and Bill Robertson, but in the second half Blackpool pulled themselves together and scored twice without reply (as well as having three more "goals" disallowed for offside) to secure their first away victory of the season. The game was attended by Jesse Collings, the local Member of Parliament.

Abbott scored Small Heath's only goal as they were knocked out of the Birmingham Cup in the second round by cup-holders Walsall. At Burnley, the home team had much the better of the first half, taking a three-goal lead. The second half was even, and the game finished 4–1. At home to Luton Town, Small Heath took the lead three times in the first half, through Tom Oakes and two goals from Abbott, the second of which was a penalty kick; in the second half, James McEwen scored an own goal to make the final score 4–2. In "boisterous" weather at Gainsborough Trinity, Small Heath could only manage a goalless draw, and they finished the month with a 2–2 draw in a friendly at Southern League club West Herts.

=== March–April ===
Charlie Hare opened the scoring after six minutes at Woolwich Arsenal, but the home side had the better of the first half, and changed ends 3–1 ahead. Jack Kirton pulled one back halfway through the second period, but Hare went off injured with ten minutes left, and the final score was 4–2. A large crowd "seemed well pleased with the display, which at times was spirited almost to roughness." For the home fixture with Grimsby Town, the directors' decision to replace Alec Leake with Billy Walton met with support from the Dart, but in a poor game, Grimsby won 2–0. "Not much interest was manifest" in a 3–0 friendly defeat at home to Aston Villa, and the Owl suggested that both clubs having nothing left to play for, their respective committees "would, doubtless, be glad to put the shutters up at once, for ... their supporters are more likely to seek excitement at a fishing match than on the football field." League competition continued with a poorly attended two-goal defeat in windy conditions away at Leicester Fosse.

On a fine April day, Ike Webb made his debut in goal away to Luton Town, where Jimmy Inglis scored the decisive goal for Small Heath in the second half. Visiting Newton Heath, Small Heath won the toss, and elected to play with the benefit of the wind behind them. They soon opened the scoring, James Higgins reacting to a shot parried by the goalkeeper, but by half time the home team had regained the lead. On change of ends, Newton Heath had much of the play, and eventually increased their lead through a Matthew Gillespie tap-in. The Manchester club's goalkeeper had no shot to save in the second half. On a wet pitch at Manchester City's Hyde Road ground, the scoring alternated. Clutterbuck, back in goal after two games out, got a hand to Billy Meredith's shot but failed to stop it, Abbott equalised, then Stockport Smith converted a penalty awarded for handball. Leake scored from distance, then Clutterbuck parried a Meredith shot to Smith's feet. In the second half, the surface became increasingly slippery, the play correspondingly scrappy, and Michael Good tied the scores from a free kick. Higgins' goal settled the meeting at home to Newcastle United, who had already made sure of their position in the promotion test matches. In "weather of almost summer warmth and brightness" at home to Lincoln City, four different scorers gave the Heathens a 4–0 win. The competitive season ended with a home win, Abbott scoring twice to Woolwich Arsenal's single reply.

== Summary and aftermath ==
Small Heath finished in sixth position in the 16-team league, nine points behind the promotion test match positions. Nineteen different players represented the club in nationally organised competitive matches during the season and there were thirteen different goalscorers. Walter Abbott was the top scorer with 19 goals, and he and wing half Thomas Dunlop played in every match. The match against Burnley attracted a crowd of 12,000, an improvement on the highest attendance in the previous two seasons. The win at Loughborough completed a sequence of nine away league wins which remains, as of May 2015, a club record.

After the promotion test match series left two teams needing to play out a goalless draw in their final match for both to be promoted, which unsurprisingly is what happened, the Football League's Annual General Meeting agreed that the First Division be extended from 16 to 18 clubs and that the top two teams in the Second Division at the end of each season should automatically replace the bottom two teams in the First. A vote was taken on the teams to take the two additional places in the First Division; Small Heath came fourth in the vote, so remained in the Second Division for the 1898–99 season. They were again awarded exemption only for the first two rounds of the qualifying competition for the FA Cup.

A Football League committee ruled on irregularities in the transfer of Jimmy Inglis to Southern League club Swindon Town. The transfer took place on a Sunday, contrary to league rules, and the forms were falsified. The player was suspended for the first month of the coming season, two Swindon Town directors were suspended for three months, each club was fined £10, and each secretary was warned as to his future conduct. Apart from Jack Kirton, who also joined Swindon, and Charlie Hare, who left the club for Watford of the Southern League, having "secured a business engagement" in that town, the remaining players signed on again for the new season. Great things were expected of Bob McRoberts, the pacy and skilful Gainsborough Trinity centre forward for whom Small Heath paid a £150 transfer fee.

== Match details ==
=== Football League Second Division ===
Date	League position	Opponents	Venue	Result	Score F–A	Scorers	Attendance
4 September 1897	5th	Burton Swifts	A	W	3–1	Inglis 2, Abbott	1,500
11 September 1897	4th	Leicester Fosse	H	W	2–1	Abbott, Gadsby	3,000
18 September 1897	3rd	Loughborough	A	W	2–0	Walton 2	2,000
25 September 1897	3rd	Burton Swifts	H	W	2–1	Hare 2	7,500
2 October 1897	3rd	Darwen	A	D	1–1	Walton	3,000
9 October 1897	3rd	Gainsborough Trinity	H	W	4–3	Abbott 2, Robertson, Hare	4,500
16 October 1897	4th	Blackpool	A	L	1–4	Hare	1,500
23 October 1897	4th	Newton Heath	H	W	2–1	Lewis 2	3,000
6 November 1897	3rd	Loughborough	H	W	1–0	Abbott	5,000
13 November 1897	4th	Grimsby Town	A	L	1–3	Wallace	2,000
27 November 1897	4th	Newcastle United	A	L	0–4		11,000
4 December 1897	4th	Walsall	H	W	6–0	Hare, Oakes 2, Abbott 2 (1 pen), Kirton	3,000
18 December 1897	4th	Walsall	A	W	2–1	Lewis 2	3,000
25 December 1897	4th	Darwen	H	W	5–1	Lewis, Abbott 3, Kirton	6,500
27 December 1897	4th	Manchester City	H	L	0–1		10,000
8 January 1898	4th	Burnley	H	D	2–2	Abbott, Leake	12,000
15 January 1898	4th	Lincoln City	A	W	2–1	Abbott, Lewis	2,500
29 January 1898	4th	Blackpool	H	L	2–3	Lewis, Robertson	6,000
5 February 1898	5th	Burnley	A	L	1–4	Oakes	4,000
12 February 1898	5th	Luton Town	H	W	4–2	Oakes, Abbott 2 (1 pen), McEwen og	4,000
19 February 1898	4th	Gainsborough Trinity	A	D	0–0		2,000
5 March 1898	5th	Woolwich Arsenal	A	L	2–4	Hare, Oakes	8,000
12 March 1898	5th	Grimsby Town	H	L	0–2		6,500
26 March 1898	8th	Leicester Fosse	A	L	0–2		2,000
2 April 1898	6th	Luton Town	A	W	2–1	Dunlop, Inglis	3,000
9 April 1898	7th	Newton Heath	A	L	1–3	Higgins	3,000
11 April 1898	8th	Manchester City	A	D	3–3	Abbott, Leake, Good	2,000
12 April 1898	6th	Newcastle United	H	W	1–0	Higgins	5,000
16 April 1898	6th	Lincoln City	H	W	4–0	Oakes, Abbott 2, Higgins	4,000
23 April 1898	6th	Woolwich Arsenal	H	W	2–1	Abbott 2	4,500

Pos	Team	Pld	W	D	L	GF	GA	GAv	Pts
4	Newton Heath	30	16	6	8	64	35	1.829	38
5	Woolwich Arsenal	30	16	5	9	69	49	1.408	37
6	Small Heath	30	16	4	10	58	50	1.160	36
7	Leicester Fosse	30	13	7	10	46	35	1.314	33
8	Luton Town	30	13	4	13	68	50	1.360	30

Rules for classification: 1) Points; 2) Goal average; 3) Goals scored

=== FA Cup ===
Round	Date	Opponents	Venue	Result	Score F–A	Scorers	Attendance
3rd qualifying	3 October 1897	Burslem Port Vale	A	L	1–2	Walton	2,000

=== Mayor of Birmingham's Charity Cup ===
Round	Date	Opponents	Venue	Result	Score F–A	Scorers	Attendance	Ref
First round	13 September 1897	West Bromwich Albion	A	L	4–7 aet		Not known	

=== Birmingham Senior Cup ===
Round	Date	Opponents	Venue	Result	Score F–A	Scorers	Attendance	Ref
Second round	31 January 1898	Walsall	A	L	2–1	Abbott	4,000	

=== Staffordshire Senior Cup ===
Round	Date	Opponents	Venue	Result	Score F–A	Scorers	Attendance	Ref
First round	18 October 1897	Wolverhampton Wanderers	A	W	3–2		Not known	
Semi-final	27 January 1898	West Bromwich Albion	A	L	0–1		Not known	

=== Other matches ===
Date	Opponents	Venue	Result	Score F–A	Scorers	Attendance	Notes
1 September 1897	Burton Wanderers	H	W	3–1	Abbott, Hare, Lewis	~200	Friendly match
6 September 1897	Lincoln City	H	W	4–0	Not known (2), Abbott (2)	Not known	Friendly
21 November 1897	Notts County	H	W	3–2	Abbott, Not known (2)	~3,000	Friendly
16 December 1897	Wellingborough Town	H	W	6–1	Not known (6)	Not known	Friendly
1 January 1898	Aston Villa	A	L	0–4		6,000	Friendly abandoned because of fog
27 February 1898	West Hertfordshire	A	D	2–2	Not known	Not known	Friendly
19 March 1898	Aston Villa	H	L	0–3		Not known	Friendly
18 April 1898	Walsall	A	W	2–0	Not known (2)	Not known	Friendly

== Appearances and goals ==
This table includes appearances and goals in nationally organised competitive matches – the Football League and FA Cup – only.
For a description of the playing positions, see Formation (association football)#2–3–5 (Pyramid).

Players' appearances and goals by competition
Name	Position	League		FA Cup		Total	
Name	Position	Apps	Goals	Apps	Goals	Apps	Goals
Henry Clutterbuck	Goalkeeper	26	0	1	0	27	0
Ike Webb	Goalkeeper	4	0	0	0	4	0
Arthur Archer	Full back	29	0	1	0	30	0
Frank Lester	Full back	10	0	1	0	11	0
Billy Pratt	Full back	20	0	0	0	20	0
Thomas Dunlop	Half back	30	0	0	0	30	0
Alex Leake	Half back	28	2	1	0	29	2
William Robertson	Half back	28	2	1	0	29	2
Billy Walton	Half back	8	3	1	1	9	4
Walter Abbott	Forward	30	19	1	0	31	19
Walter Gadsby	Forward	1	1	0	0	1	1
Michael Good	Forward	8	1	1	0	9	1
James Higgins	Forward	6	3	0	0	6	3
Charlie Hare	Forward	23	6	1	0	24	6
Jimmy Inglis	Forward	10	3	0	0	10	3
Jack Kirton	Forward	18	2	0	0	18	2
Wilson Lewis	Forward	20	7	1	0	21	7
Thomas Oakes	Forward	22	6	1	0	23	6
Alec Wallace	Forward	2	1	0	0	2	1
Sid Wharton	Forward	7	0	0	0	7	0
