= 1896–97 Small Heath F.C. season =

Small Heath F.C.
1896–97 season
- Chairman: Walter W. Hart
- Secretary: Alfred Jones
- Ground: Coventry Road
- Football League Second Division: 4th (of 16)
- FA Cup: First round proper (eliminated by Notts County)
- Birmingham Senior Cup: Semi-final (eliminated by Wolverhampton Wanderers)
- Staffordshire Senior Cup: First round (eliminated by Wolverhampton Wanderers)
- Top goalscorer: League: Jimmy Inglis (16); All: Jimmy Inglis (16)
- Highest home attendance: 7,500 vs Grimsby Town (31 October 1896) Walsall (25 December 1896)
- Lowest home attendance: 800 vs Manchester City (19 April 1897)
Team colours

The 1896–97 season was the 16th season of competitive association football and 5th season in the Football League played by Small Heath F.C., an English football club based in Birmingham. In 1895–96, Small Heath finished in 15th position in the 16-team First Division and were relegated via the test match system. In 1896–97, they finished 4th in the Second Division.

Small Heath entered the 1896–97 FA Cup at the first round (round of 32) and lost in that round for the fifth consecutive year, this time to Notts County. In local competitions, they were eliminated in the semi-final of the Birmingham Senior Cup and the first round of the Staffordshire Senior Cup, on each occasion beaten by Wolverhampton Wanderers.

Twenty-three different players represented the club in nationally organised competitive matches during the season and there were 12 different goalscorers. Alex Leake appeared in every match, and the top scorer was Jimmy Inglis with 16 goals. The highest attendance was around 7,500, significantly down on the previous season.

== Background ==
The Nottinghamshire Guardian suggested Small Heath would "have to greatly improve their present team if they are to make a very prominent display even in [the second] division next season." Billy Ollis, last season's captain, moved on to Hereford Thistle of the Birmingham & District League, Jack Oliver returned to non-League football in his native north-east, Harry Haynes joined Southern League club Southampton St Mary's, Ted Devey left for Burton Wanderers, and Adam Fraser returned to Scotland, but the major loss was that of Fred Wheldon. Wheldon scored 116 goals from 175 matches in league and FA Cup for Small Heath, and the only match he missed in six seasons was when his sister died on the morning of the game. He joined League champions Aston Villa for a fee which, after much speculation, was confirmed at Small Heath's Annual General Meeting as £350 guaranteed, plus the proceeds of a match to be played between the two clubs. The £350 fee was reported to be a transfer record.

== Review ==
=== September–October ===
Small Heath prepared for the new season with a friendly match at Aston Villa in connection with Fred Wheldon's transfer. Wheldon scored twice as Villa won 3–1, Small Heath's goal coming from Walter Abbott. Because the kickoff was delayed until six o'clock, the match ended in near darkness. The League season began with a spirited performance at home to Newcastle United on a rain-soaked pitch. First-half goals from Alex Leake, Jimmy Inglis with a header from Tom Farnall's free kick, and Jack Jones gave Small Heath a 3–1 victory, prompting the press to predict a finish in the test match positions. In the return fixture, Newcastle led 3–2 at half time – three goals for Richard Smellie against Jones's two – but were reduced to ten men, William Graham having broken his arm. Inglis tied the scores in the second half but the home team scored a late winner. Two days later, Small Heath enjoyed a comfortable home win against Darwen in an early-evening match. Inglis opened the scoring with a header, then in the second half, a disputed goal was allowed, and a fine shot from Billy Walton and two goals from William Robertson made the final score 5–1.

In a poor game, Small Heath suffered an unexpected defeat at home to Lincoln City. The Leicester Chronicle suggested that "if the Heathens have any pretentions towards regaining their position in the First Division, as we believe is their ambition, they will have to show form vastly different from last Saturday." An Inglis header gave his team a first-half lead on a slippery surface at Burton Swifts, and both sides wasted chances before Swifts equalised with ten minutes left.

A 2–1 defeat at home to Burton Swifts preceded a visit to league leaders Newton Heath and reunion with former captain Caesar Jenkyns. The home side had the better of the first half, in torrential rain following a thunderstorm just before kickoff, but the closest they came to scoring was when Smith hit the bar. In the second half, Newton Heath scored from a scrimmage, but Jones equalised for Small Heath after the forwards rushed downfield. Playing with the benefit of the slope, Walsall took the lead twice in the Staffordshire Cup, but on change of ends, Small Heath equalised, and scored twice more in extra time to progress to the next round.

In mid-October, former England international forward Dennis Hodgetts joined from Aston Villa. The Dundee Courier & Argus assessed the player thus:

Aston Villa have so many clever forwards that they afford to dispense with a man like Hodgetts, who is now naturally slow, and disinclined to work. But his judgment and coaching powers should render him a useful recruit for the other Birmingham club ... Hodgetts is the one historic forward England has produced. As an inside left it is doubtful if he ever had an equal; certainly he never had a superior. He was one of the most artistic dribblers and dodgers ever seen, and his unselfishness was proverbial.

He made his debut on a dull, damp day at home to Gainsborough Trinity. Small Heath took a two-goal lead through Inglis and Leake, the visitors brought the scores level before half time, and with 15 minutes left, Trinity's John Scott was sent off for striking Jack Jones. When the matter came before the County Association, the player received a suspension of one week – the minimum punishment permissible – because of his 17 years unblemished conduct and having acted under "great provocation, Jones having kicked him off his legs and he 'only cleaned one hand on him'." Small Heath were overwhelmed by four goals to nil by Wolverhampton Wanderers in the Staffordshire Cup. Perhaps fortunate to find Walsall without their first-choice goalkeeper and three forwards, Small Heath won 6–1 away from home, with two goals from Inglis and Walton and one apiece from Jones and Charles Izon. Despite the convincing nature of their victory, the Leicester Chronicle thought it was probably too late for the team to reach the test match positions. John Logan, late of Partick Thistle, made his debut in a 1–0 defeat at home to Grimsby Town which proved his only appearance in the English leagues.

=== November–December ===
Having no competitive fixture scheduled during the early part of November, Small Heath played Wolverhampton Wanderers in a friendly as part of a day of musical and sporting entertainments at the Crystal Palace grounds. On a raw day, only 500 spectators watched Small Heath's 2–0 victory which failed to entertain the Penny Illustrated Paper:

That the paid player is wanting in keenness when the match is "friendly", i.e. not associated with League or Cup competition, has very nearly, if not quite, become proverbial. Small Heath and Wolverhampton Wanderers gave an exhibition at the Crystal Palace which could not be calculated to impress visitors favourably.

Back in the League, Woolwich Arsenal took an early lead at Coventry Road but were 4–1 down by half time, Hodgetts scoring twice and Walton and Robertson once each. In the second half James Brock pulled one back for the visitors, but Charlie Hare, on his debut after joining from the Arsenal a few days before, made the final score 5–2. The visit to Darwen produced a 2–0 defeat which could have been heavier had the home club not had two second-half goals disallowed. According to the Leicester Chronicle, "the match between Newton Heath and Small Heath, as usual, when these teams meet, was not a very scientific one, the players on both sides being too prone to play the man instead of the ball." Jimmy Inglis had to leave the field "badly winded", and Hare had several shots from distance, but the only goal was scored by Jones after five minutes.

A friendly arranged at short notice at Millwall Athletic attracted few spectators, "the poor form displayed recently by Small Heath causing the fixture to possess but little interest"; Millwall won 9–1. Back in the league, a fine attacking display gave Grimsby Town a 2–0 half-time lead; on change of ends, playing against the wind, Small Heath's performance improved, and Hare scored on the break ten minutes from time, but they were unable to equalise. In the first round of the Birmingham Cup, an own goal earned Small Heath a draw at Burton Swifts. The losing run in the League continued with a "sorry show" at Loughborough. The home side's long-ball style effectively disrupted Small Heath's preference for close passing, and the game finished 2–0. At home to Walsall, whom they had beaten 6–1 in the previous meeting, Small Heath had much the better of the first half, with goals from Charlie Izon and Denny Hodgetts, but the visitors equalised after a goalkeeping error, and the final score was 3–3, Walsall being "unlucky in not winning".

December ended with two friendly matches. On Boxing Day, the visitors, Scottish League leaders Hibernians, began the match "in brilliant style", and although the heavy pitch initially inhibited their shooting, they came out winners by five goals to two. A crowd of 4,000 attended a benefit match for Aston Villa full-back Jim Elliott, who had been "incapacitated by illness". Elliott died less than three years later, at the age of 29. After a series of poor results, attendances had dwindled. The Owl's correspondent approved of the selection of Hare at centre-forward, but suggested that until the club signed "two or three good men" to play in defensive positions, the team's decline would continue.

=== January–February ===
Small Heath suffered a predictable defeat at Hyde Road against Manchester City on New Year's Day. Poor goalkeeping by Ernest Pointer allowed James Sharples to open the scoring, though both goalkeepers made good saves to restrict the first-half score to that one goal. After the interval, City increased their lead first from a scrimmage, and again from a free kick. After the recent defeats, the committee made several changes for the following day's visit to Gainsborough Trinity. Jimmy Inglis, reported to have been "content to take matters too easily of late", was omitted, Billy Walton moved from the half-back line to his former position of inside right, and Tom Farnall returned at half-back. Gainsborough fielded former Small Heath players Bernard Pumfrey and Tom Bayley. Although the visitors fell behind early in the game, goals from Walton and Denny Hodgetts gave the visitors a half-time lead, which was extended to 3–1 by the close.

A friendly visit to New Brompton in Kent produced a 4–1 defeat, followed on the Monday by Billy Walton's benefit match against Aston Villa. Unfortunately for the beneficiary, who had served the club for eight years and was "generally admitted to be the most consistent player the club possesses", fears that the attendance would be a low one were realised. The Dart's "What We Hear" column suggested that the match raised only £30, "that he deserved far more, and it is a pity that the committee do not see their way to make it up to a respectable sum". Without a fixture for the following Saturday, Small Heath attempted to arrange another friendly in the south of England, but after their previous performances in such matches, no potential opponent were prepared to offer a sufficient financial guarantee for them to agree to travel. Perhaps the free weekend motivated the players, for in wintry weather they won the replayed Birmingham Cup-tie against Burton Swifts by seven goals to one.

A gale damaged the roof of the grandstand at the Coventry Road ground; fortunately, the next day's match was away, at Blackpool, and the damage was repaired before Small Heath played at home again. Blackpool took the lead after only five minutes, but their cause was hindered soon afterwards when they lost Harry Stirzaker to a head injury early in the game, and Tom Oakes scored twice as Small Heath exploited their numerical advantage to win 3–1. January ended with the first-round FA Cup tie played in heavy sleet at home to against Second Division leaders Notts County. In the first half, Notts were largely on the defensive, but early in the second, they twice forced the ball home. Small Heath pressed again, and Walton scored, but they were unable to equalise. The Owl reported they suffered "cruel luck", that Notts' victory owed much to George Toone's goalkeeping, and that "the attack was better than we have seen it this season." The Dart offered particular praise to Denny Hodgetts, "by far the cleverest player on the field", and not at all the has-been he was thought to be when he signed.

Small Heath put out a strong side against Wolverhampton Wanderers in the second round of the Birmingham Cup, but lost Oakes to injury in the first half, and suffered defeat by eight goals to two. Again, the Owl bemoaned the lack of "vigorous and resourceful backs". They returned to League action with a 6–2 win at Burton Wanderers, including two goals on debut for reserve forward Walter Gadsby; a five-goal lead soon after half time led to "the visitors' backs taking things rather too easy". A comfortable 5–1 win against a weakened Liverpool team, in which Charlie Hare, "shooting in a very dangerous manner, and making the best use of openings given him", scored a hat-trick, preceded the return fixture against Burton Wanderers, who featured former Small Heath regulars Will and Ted Devey. An exciting game saw Small Heath fight back to win 3–2 to secure their fourth consecutive victory, marred by a first-half injury to Billy Walton that proved to be a broken shoulderblade that kept him out for the remainder of the season. The Leicester Chronicle wondered what they might give now "for some of the points they let slip in the beginning of the season".

=== March–April ===
In front of 6,000 spectators at Coventry Road, Blackpool took the lead after half an hour, and doubled it early in the second half. After many fruitless attempts, Small Heath eventually scored from a scrimmage, but Jimmy Martin extended Blackpool's lead again. Despite reaching the interval a goal in arrears to Lincoln City, Small Heath's winning run resumed as they overran the division's bottom club with second-half goals from Inglis, Oakes and Jack Jones, and Loughborough found the home side's forwards in top form as they lost 3–0 at Coventry Road. Denny Hodgetts scored the only goal of Small Heath's visit to Leicester Fosse. Despite the strong cross-field wind, the game was an excellent one: writing for a local readership, the Leicester Chronicle thought that "no one can begrudge Small Heath their victory, though at the same time a draw would more adequately have represented the play", and that "had Fosse won, the game would undoubtedly have been voted one of best seen on the ground; as it was, the only drawback to a splendid exhibition was their regrettable failure in front of goal." The strong wind at Plumstead blew along the pitch, and had a significant effect on the game. Playing with both wind and sun at their backs, Woolwich Arsenal took a 2–1 lead in the first half, but on change of ends, former Arsenal player Charlie Hare scored twice to give Small Heath a fourth consecutive win.

A "great surprise" was the London Standard's assessment of the victory at division leaders Notts County by two Walter Abbott goals to one from Tom Boucher. The win completed a "remarkable" series of performances for Small Heath, "who in the short space of eight days capture[d] the full share of points away from home from such clubs as Fosse, Woolwich Arsenal, and Notts County", an effort that came too late to oust Newton Heath from second position. In the return fixture with Notts, who were by then certain of the divisional championship, Small Heath took a 3–0 half time lead, after which they "did not exert themselves to any great extent", and won the game 3–1. Playing with the wind in their favour at Coventry Road, Leicester Fosse had a one-goal lead at the interval, but on change of ends Inglis equalised, and the game finished two goals apiece. In the last game of the season, at home to Manchester City, Billy Meredith opened the scoring after Robert Hill had a goal disallowed for offside, but Small Heath added three goals in the second half, a header and a penalty from Leake and the third from Hare, to earn a decisive victory, their seventh in the last eight matches of the season, earning them a finishing position of fourth, only two points outside the test match places.

When the Football Association announced the list of clubs exempt from the qualifying competition for the 1897–98 FA Cup, Small Heath were not on it, although their less successful local rivals Walsall were. The Sports Argus suggested that this was the club's own doing: "a well-known League club's secretary told me that Small Heath only had themselves to blame for their non-inclusion among the exempted clubs, and that whereas they had not a single 'friend at Court', the Walsall people had had most assiduously campaigned for support". After the League season finished, Small Heath played a friendly against Grimsby Town in Hull, a city with a strong rugby league tradition, in order "to encourage the game [of association football] in the town".

== Summary and aftermath ==
The Sports Argus' post-season editorial expressed disappointment with the team's performance and dissatisfaction with the running of the club. At the start of the season, they "confidently looked forward" to Small Heath reaching the test match positions, even if they proved unsuccessful therein. But the team's fine finish to the season on top of such a poor start made it "terribly aggravating to think that the least bit of extra effort earlier on in the season would in all probability have seen them a good second to the County." The club's failure to gain exemption from the qualifying competition of the FA Cup "only serves to strengthen my belief that the club wants a thorough wakening-up". The club made a loss of £369 on the year, which the Dart suggested was due less to the effects of bad weather, as claimed in the annual report, than to a "penny wise and pound foolish" approach to the signing of players which they hoped would not be repeated in the season to come.

Aston Villa's old grandstand in place as a terrace cover at the Muntz Street end of the Coventry Road ground

There was little turnover of players during the close season. The ambitious and well-funded Bristol City, newly elected to the Southern League for the 1897–98 season, signed both Jones and Farnall on attractive terms, reported as £5 to sign, then 50s. during the playing season and 30s. in the summer. "Abbott would also have gone but that Mr. Hart, the President, took action just in the nick of time. As to Farnall, it is doubtful whether he would have been re-engaged, but Jones's loss is regretted, as he was developing into a very smart forward." Charlie Izon left for Walsall, and Denny Hodgetts, who had been reinstated as an amateur, offered his services, but "as he could not promise to play for them regularly", his offer was declined.

The Dart's initial opinion was that the standard of replacement for Hodgetts, who had been reinstated as an amateur, Jones and Farnall – "two or three players who have done well with local clubs have been signed up, and a smart left-wing forward in Kirton, of Lincoln City, has also been secured" – but as the directors preferred to spend their money on ground improvements, in the shape of the purchase of Aston Villa's old stands from the Perry Barr ground, rather than on "stars", these would be inadequate to return the club to the First Division. Having seen the new additions, they changed their mind. "The Small Heath ground presents quite an imposing appearance now that it is adorned with the old Perry Barr grand stand, and as there is now plenty of covered accommodation for spectators the "gates" should materially increase", and though Hodgetts would be missed, Jack Kirton "appears to be a smart player, while the other new men secured are far from being 'duffers'", and apart from Jones and Farnall, "the whole of the other first team players from last season have signed again, and there is no reason why the Heathens should not render a good account of themselves" next season.

== Match details ==
=== Football League Second Division ===
Date	League position	Opponents	Venue	Result	Score F–A	Scorers	Attendance
5 September 1896	5th	Newcastle United	H	W	3–1	Leake, Inglis, Jones	4,000
12 September 1896	7th	Newcastle United	A	L	3–4	Jones 2, Inglis	10,853
14 September 1896	4th	Darwen	H	W	5–1	Inglis, Walton, Robertson 2, Nixon o.g.	800
19 September 1896	7th	Lincoln City	H	L	1–2	Edwards	6,500
26 September 1896	7th	Burton Swifts	A	D	1–1	Inglis	2,000
3 October 1896	10th	Burton Swifts	H	L	1–2	Inglis	4,000
10 October 1896	9th	Newton Heath	A	D	1–1	Jones	7,000
17 October 1896	9th	Gainsborough Trinity	H	D	2–2	Inglis, Leake	6,000
24 October 1896	7th	Walsall	A	W	6–1	Izon, Inglis 2, Walton 2, Jones	4,000
31 October 1896	7th	Grimsby Town	H	L	0–1		7,500
14 November 1896	7th	Woolwich Arsenal	H	W	5–2	Hodgetts, Farnall, Walton, Hare, Robertson	2,000
21 November 1896	7th	Darwen	A	L	0–2		3,000
28 November 1896	7th	Newton Heath	H	W	1–0	Jones	4,000
12 December 1896	8th	Grimsby Town	A	L	1–2	Inglis	2,000
19 December 1896	8th	Loughborough	A	L	0–2		1,000
25 December 1896	8th	Walsall	H	D	3–3	Inglis, Hare, Izon	7,500
1 January 1897	12th	Manchester City	A	L	0–3		16,000
2 January 1897	9th	Gainsborough Trinity	A	W	3–1	Hodgetts 2, Izon	1,500
23 January 1897	9th	Blackpool	A	W	3–1	Inglis 2, Hare	1,000
13 February 1897	8th	Burton Wanderers	A	W	6–2	Gadsby 2, Inglis, Hare, Hodgetts, Walton	2,000
27 February 1897	8th	Burton Wanderers	H	W	3–2	Hodgetts, Hare, Oakes	6,000
6 March 1897	9th	Blackpool	H	L	1–3	Hodgetts	5,000
13 March 1897	7th	Lincoln City	A	W	3–1	Inglis, Oakes, Jones	4,000
20 March 1897	7th	Loughborough	H	W	3–0	Jones 2, Leake	2,000
27 March 1897	5th	Leicester Fosse	A	W	1–0	Hodgetts	5,500
29 March 1897	5th	Woolwich Arsenal	A	W	3–2	Hodgetts 2, Hare	3,000
3 April 1897	5th	Notts County	A	W	2–1	Abbott 2	4,000
10 April 1897	5th	Notts County	H	W	3–1	Abbott 2, Inglis	7,000
16 April 1897	4th	Leicester Fosse	H	D	2–2	Hare, Inglis	2,000
19 April 1897	4th	Manchester City	H	W	3–1	Leake 2, Hare	600

Final Second Division table (part)
Pos	Club	Pld	W	D	L	F	A	GA	Pts
2	Newton Heath	30	17	5	8	56	34	1.65	39
3	Grimsby Town	30	17	4	9	66	45	1.47	38
4	Small Heath	30	16	5	9	69	47	1.47	37
5	Newcastle United	30	17	1	12	56	52	1.08	35
6	Manchester City	30	12	8	10	58	50	1.16	32
Key: Pld = Matches played; W = Matches won; D = Matches drawn; L = Matches lost; F = Goals for; A = Goals against; GA = Goal average; Pts = Points

=== FA Cup ===
Round	Date	Opponents	Venue	Result	Score F–A	Scorers	Attendance
1st	30 January 1897	Notts County	H	L	1–2	Walton	10,000

=== Birmingham Senior Cup ===
Round	Date	Opponents	Venue	Result	Score F–A	Scorers	Attendance	Ref
1st	14 December 1896	Burton Swifts	A	D	2–2	Haddon, "mistake by Chattman"	Not known	
Replay	18 January 1897	Burton Swifts	H	W	7–1	Hare 3, Edwards, Not known (3)	Not known	
SF	6 February 1897	Wolverhampton Wanderers	A	L	2–8	Hare, Hodgetts	Not known	

=== Staffordshire Senior Cup ===
Round	Date	Opponents	Venue	Result	Score F–A	Scorers	Attendance	Ref
	12 October 1896	Walsall	A	W	4–2 aet	Jones, "scrimmage", Not known (2)	2,000	
1st	19 October 1896	Wolverhampton Wanderers	A	L	0–4		4,000	

=== Other matches ===
Date	Opponents	Venue	Result	Score F–A	Scorers	Attendance	Notes
1 September 1896	Aston Villa	A	L	3–1	Not known	2,000	Benefit match in connection with the transfer of Fred Wheldon
7 November 1896	Wolverhampton Wanderers	Crystal Palace	W	2–0	Farnall, Hare	500	Friendly match
5 December 1896	Millwall Athletic	A	L	9–1	Good	Very poor	Friendly match
26 December 1896	Hibernian	H	L	2–5	Hodgetts, Hare	2,000	Friendly match
29 December 1896	Aston Villa	A	D	1–1	Groves	4,000	Benefit match for Elliott (Aston Villa)
9 January 1897	New Brompton	A	L	1–4	Hodgetts	Not known	Friendly match
11 January 1897	Aston Villa	H	W	1–0	Edwards, Oakes	1,500	Benefit match for Billy Walton
20 February 1897	Liverpool	H	W	5–1	Hare 3, Walton, Oakes	Not known	Friendly match
24 April 1897	Grimsby Town	A	L	1–2	Not known	Not known	Friendly match

== Appearances and goals ==
This table includes appearances and goals in nationally organised competitive matches – the Football League and FA Cup – only.
For a description of the playing positions, see Formation (association football)#2–3–5 (Pyramid).

Players' appearances and goals by competition
Name	Position	League		FA Cup		Total	
Name	Position	Apps	Goals	Apps	Goals	Apps	Goals
Bill Meates	Goalkeeper	2	0	0	0	2	0
Ernest Pointer	Goalkeeper	28	0	1	0	29	0
Frank Lester	Full back	27	0	1	0	28	0
Billy Pratt	Full back	27	0	1	0	28	0
Harry Williams	Full back	1	0	0	0	1	0
Thomas Dunlop	Half back	18	0	1	0	19	0
Tom Farnall	Half back	15	0	0	0	15	0
Michael Good	Half back	3	0	0	0	3	0
Alex Leake	Half back	30	5	1	0	31	5
Billy Walton	Half back	21	5	1	1	26	6
Walter Abbott	Forward	12	4	0	0	12	4
Billy Bennett	Forward	2	0	0	0	2	0
Bill Edwards	Forward	5	1	0	0	5	1
Walter Gadsby	Forward	3	2	0	0	3	2
Harry Haddon	Forward	3	0	0	0	3	0
Charlie Hare	Forward	20	8	1	0	20	8
Dennis Hodgetts	Forward	22	9	1	0	23	9
Jimmy Inglis	Forward	29	16	1	0	30	16
Charles Izon	Forward	9	3	0	0	9	3
Jack Jones	Forward	20	9	0	0	20	9
John Logan	Forward	1	0	0	0	1	0
Thomas Oakes	Forward	9	2	1	0	10	2
William Robertson	Forward	23	3	1	0	24	3
