= 1895–96 Small Heath F.C. season =

Small Heath F.C.
1895–96 season
- Chairman: Walter W. Hart
- Secretary: Alfred Jones
- Ground: Coventry Road
- Football League First Division: 15th (of 16) (relegated)
- FA Cup: First round proper (eliminated by Bury)
- Birmingham Senior Cup: First round (eliminated by Sheffield Wednesday)
- Staffordshire Senior Cup: First round (eliminated by West Bromwich Albion)
- Top goalscorer: League: Frank Mobley (11); All: Frank Mobley (11)
- Highest home attendance: 10,000 vs Aston Villa (26 October 1895); Derby County (4 January 1896)
- Lowest home attendance: 3,000 vs Everton (7 December 1895)
Team colours

The 1895–96 season was the 15th season of competitive association football and fourth season in the Football League played by Small Heath F.C., an English football club based in Birmingham. In 1894–95, the newly promoted Small Heath maintained their First Division status, finishing 12th in the 16-team division. In 1895–96, the team finished 15th and were relegated through the test match system.

Small Heath entered the 1895–96 FA Cup at the first round proper, and lost in that round for the fourth consecutive year, this time to Bury. In local competitions, they were eliminated in the first round of the Birmingham Senior Cup by Sheffield Wednesday, and lost to West Bromwich Albion in the first round of the Staffordshire Senior Cup, which they had entered for the first time.

Thirty-two different players represented the club in nationally organised competitive matches during the season and there were 14 different goalscorers. For the fifth time, Fred Wheldon appeared in every League match, in his last season with the club before joining local rivals Aston Villa for an initial transfer fee of £350, believed to be a record. The top scorer, for the third year running, was Frank Mobley with 11 goals. The highest attendance was around 10,000, significantly down on the previous season.

== Background ==
Small Heath had finished 12th of 16 teams in 1894–95, their first season in the First Division. Alf Jones continued as secretary-manager, and Billy Ollis took over the captaincy after Caesar Jenkyns was dismissed for misconduct. Apart from Jenkyns, who signed for Woolwich Arsenal where he was appointed captain, all the regular first-team players remained with the club. Of the fringe players, Charlie Letherbarrow joined Millwall, with whom he won the Southern League title in 1895–96, Ernie Moore and Tilson Pritchard returned to non-League football, and Tom Watson resumed his police career.

Goalkeeper Joe Fall signed from Newton Heath for a fee reported as £20, and defender Harry Haynes joined from Wolverhampton Wanderers. The Dart thought that Jenkyns would be missed "a great deal more than some of [the] supporters imagine", and that apart from Fall, who was expected to be a significant improvement on Charles Partridge, the 1895–96 team would be noticeably weaker than that of the season just ended.

There was no change to the team's kit of light blue shirts with navy collar trim, cuffs and pocket, white knickerbockers and navy socks.

== Review ==
=== September–October ===
Both Sheffield United and Small Heath fielded the same personnel as in the last game of the previous season, which Small Heath had won to secure their First Division status. The Sheffield Independent's prediction that the result would be reversed proved justified. The players had not yet got used to the new rule forbidding the thrower to step over the line while taking a throw-in, and after penalising the Sheffield captain for a foul throw, the referee took time out to demonstrate the correct procedure.

With Joe Fall still unavailable because of an injury sustained in pre-season training, Charles Partridge was replaced in goal by reserve Jim Roach, who made an eventful debut at local rivals Aston Villa. According to the Birmingham Daily Post, he should take no blame for any of the five goals conceded before half-time, due in part to the sun in his eyes and with the half-backs "little more than landmarks on the field". On change of ends, the balance of play tilted towards the visitors, but the match still finished 7–3. Fall returned to fitness for Small Heath's third defeat of the season, at home to Stoke in a game characterised by excessive foul play. At Nottingham Forest, Tommy Hands and Jack Hallam were lively on the wings, but the weakness of the half-back line was noted in yet another loss.

In temperatures approaching 80 °F (27 °C), Bolton Wanderers went top of the league by inflicting on Small Heath their fifth defeat in as many games. The forwards, with Frank Mobley the honourable exception, were "lamentably deficient in shooting ability", missing two early chances which "had their shooting been only of a medium character" would have opened the scoring. With only a month of the season gone, the Post suggested it was high time results began to change or there was a real prospect of relegation via the test matches. A visit to Preston North End produced a much improved performance but still no points. After Preston opened the scoring against the run of play, Small Heath took the lead through a "couple of stinging shots" from Mobley, who appeared to score a third soon after half-time, but it was disallowed because goalkeeper James Trainer was impeded. Small Heath were playing the better football, and the home fans began to jeer their team. Perhaps that had an effect, for after a succession of corners, Preston regained the lead to take the game by three goals to two.

On 12 October, Small Heath finally won a match. They beat Bury 5–4 in a game "remarkable for the poor defence on both sides". The Dart's gloomy view that "if they gain any points at all out of [the next four] games it will be a bit of a surprise to a large number of their followers" was evidence of growing discontent. Many English clubs had imported top Scottish players to strengthen their team, but Small Heath's directors were unwilling to follow suit.

A disappointingly small crowd saw Small Heath lose 3–1 to Aston Villa in a benefit match for Ted Devey, the club's longest-serving player and fans' favourite who had been in poor health. Both clubs had promised full first teams, but numerous regulars were unavailable, and Small Heath fielded their fourth different goalkeeper of the season, Bill Meates, an amateur signed from Eastbourne a few weeks earlier. Meates kept his place for the next League game, and Hands, who was injured against Bury, Billy Walton and Devey were replaced by Jack Jones, Charlie Izon and Alex Leake, the latter two making their first appearances of the season, as Small Heath were "completely outclassed" by Stoke. The Heathens had much the better of the first half against Aston Villa, and the pace and trickery of the visitors' forwards was thwarted only by the excellence of the home side's defence. The second half was quite the opposite. Meates made two blunders that led to goals, Villa gained and kept the upper hand, and the final score was 4–1.

=== November–December ===
The directors changed their minds, and sent secretary Alf Jones and player Jack Oliver to Scotland on a recruitment mission. Their only purchase was greeted with suspicion by the Dart: the 19-year-old Adam Fraser "is said to be a most capable half-back. Whether he is worth all the trouble the club have gone through to secure him remains to be seen, but if he is anything like a 'class' player it is strange that he has never been heard of before." It was reported that the Cambridge University and England full back Lewis Vaughan Lodge had agreed to play for the club, but he did appear until February. Meanwhile, after a casual start, Small Heath came back from a three-goal deficit to beat Leyton 8–3 in a friendly. Winning ways continued in the League as they beat Nottingham Forest with a goal in the first five minutes, scored by Hands from a Hallam centre. Roach's performance in goal suggested he was the best of the four tried thus far, and Frank Lester made a promising debut at back, but both teams' forwards were disappointing.

The visit to Bolton Wanderers was postponed after severe weather in the north-west left the ground waterlogged, so the next game was at home to Preston North End on 23 November. Wheldon, back to something approaching his best, scored twice from distance to lead 2–1 at half-time. During the interval, Preston's goalkeeper John Wright was found to have broken his wrist and could not continue. Lester turned the ball into his own net to bring the scores level, but despite the brilliance of Bob Holmes, playing on his own at back after Sandy Tait had gone in goal, Preston could not prevent Small Heath exploiting their numerical advantage. The third goal ended with ball, goalkeeper and all five Small Heath forwards in the net, after which Jones scored twice to make the final score 5–2. Walton, now playing at centre half, drew particular praise for his judgment and the quality of his passing. The two points gained took Small Heath off the bottom of the table for the first time.

Fraser made his first-team debut in a benefit match for Sam Holmes of Walsall, and his League debut the following Saturday at Derby County alongside Dan Bruce. Bruce, a Scottish forward signed from Notts County for a £100 transfer fee – the first time that Small Heath had paid a three-figure sum for a player – came with a "great reputation as a cool, clever player, and a good shot", but was far from fit. Small Heath never threatened, each of the five Derby forwards scored in the first half, and the final score was 8–0.

A poor performance followed at home to Everton. In the face of wind laced with flurries of snow, Small Heath "almost to a man, blocked their goal in such a manner as to render it well nigh impossible for Everton to score through such a forest of legs." On Small Heath's sole attack, they might have scored, the ball coming down off the crossbar a foot over the line before spinning back into play. The Daily Post wondered whether, as had happened more than once in recent matches, "a strong and unanimous appeal by Small Heath might have gained them a goal". Everton went into the interval a goal ahead and scored two more in the second half to go top of the League. Caesar Jenkyns, now captain of Arsenal, was among the spectators, and the Daily Post speculated on how much difference his captaincy might make to his old club's current predicament.

The expected heavy defeat at Sunderland failed to materialise, that club's winning goal coming only when Jack Oliver – a native of the town – chested the ball into his own net while attempting to block a shot. The Leicester Chronicle suggested that if Small Heath could only maintain similar form, they would soon be out of trouble. An exciting though unscientific local derby against West Bromwich Albion, the closest team to Small Heath in the table, produced a 2–2 draw in which Fraser's courage and judgment in a defensive role was remarked upon, and Bruce and James Adlington scored their first goals for the club. On an icy surface on Boxing Day, the home forwards' enthusiasm was rewarded with a goal scored by Adlington from a Wheldon cross to beat Burnley and narrow the gap to just one point behind that club and West Bromwich Albion.

After the last scheduled match of 1895, at Everton, was abandoned after 37 minutes because of bad weather and the state of the pitch, there was discontent among the crowd. Some of those present demanded their money back, and one spectator took the host club to court claiming the return of his admission money. The case was decided in favour of the club, the judge ruling that the paying spectator is not entitled to a full 90 minutes' football, but only to that portion which can reasonably be completed within the rules of the game.

=== January–February ===
"There was only one team in it at Coventry-road on Saturday, and that team was not the Heathens." So said the Sheffield Independent as Derby County won 3–1 to return to the top of the table. In the next week, Small Heath were eliminated in the first round of two local cup competitions. Tommy Hands scored and Billy Ollis was carried off injured as they lost 2–1 to West Bromwich Albion in the first round of the Staffordshire Senior Cup, a competition they had entered for the first time, and in the Birmingham Cup, they lost by the same score at Sheffield Wednesday in a game marked by poor forward play by both sides. The programme for January finished with home and away matches against Wolverhampton Wanderers. At home, Hands and Mobley were left out. Adlington, who had scored in four successive matches, Bruce and Ollis scored before the interval, but the second half was one-sided in the opposite direction. Wanderers came back to 3–2, "shots innumerable were sent in", but Small Heath held on for their fifth win of the season. At Wolverhampton, Wheldon opened the scoring for the visitors much against the run of play, but thereafter Wanderers scored at will to make the final score 7–2.

Small Heath were without several first-team regulars against a full-strength Bury side in the first round of the FA Cup. During the first half the play was fast-paced, end-to-end and goalless until Harry Haynes left the field with a knee injury. He resumed after the interval, limping heavily, but during his absence Bury took a 2–0 lead, which they were to double before Lewis scored a late consolation. Two days later, in the replay of the match abandoned for bad weather, Small Heath's forwards pressed hard early on, but faded after Hugh Goldie scored somewhat against the run of play and Everton won 3–0. The Liverpool Mercury picked out debutant Tom Farnall as making a good impression at right-half. An improved performance secured a draw at home to Sheffield Wednesday, Leake scoring a headed goal, his first for the club. Wednesday had a goal from a free kick disallowed because the ball had not touched another player on its way into the net, though Meates made a desperate attempt to save it after it appeared to have deflected off Fred Spiksley.

By this stage of the season, criticism of the club both on and off the field was widespread. The Sportsman's investigation into the finances of Midlands football clubs criticised the committee's perceived reluctance to act:

When this club obtained its position in the First League last season the committee had a splendid chance of obtaining big 'gates' and doing well. But the chances were thrown away. They were afraid to speculate ... and went on with the old team last season, and they delayed enterprise this year until too late.

The test matches were expected "almost as a matter of certainty, and with an air of resignation born of a long series of feeble and disappointing exhibitions." While recognising that "the majority of the players had fallen far short of expectation", the Sheffield Independent questioned the managerial wisdom of "continually changing the players, as has been done now for some time" – playing four different centre-forwards in a month, and fielding players who were apparently not physically fit, as Dan Bruce against Sheffield Wednesday.

After a lively friendly against Aston Villa produced a 2–1 win for Small Heath, they returned to losing ways at Bolton Wanderers. Harry Haddon, a soldier stationed at Lichfield, set up a goal for Mobley, but by then the home side were 3–0 up against a struggling defence. Small Heath put out a strong side against Blackburn Rovers – the Leicester Chronicle believed that "at no period of the season have they had such a representative team". While Corinthian back Lewis Vaughan Lodge's long-expected first appearance for the club – which proved to be his last – was marred by a lack of discipline positionally, Haddon enhanced his reputation at centre-forward and contributed to Wheldon's fine winning goal after debutant Bill Robertson had scored from a penalty kick. The Rovers forwards played an effective dribbling game, but Small Heath's once-characteristic "dash" earned them victory and took them into March off the bottom of the table.

=== March–April ===
A 1–0 defeat of Bury, courtesy of Haddon after a Wheldon header had been ruled out for offside, took Small Heath out of the test match positions at the expense of Wolverhampton Wanderers, but the latter club had the easier run-in to the end of the season. After a more than usually entertaining friendly at Leicester Fosse finished 3–2 to the home side, Small Heath resumed their League campaign with a visit to Blackburn Rovers, in which a performance " much better ... than was expected of them" still ended in defeat. They came close to opening the scoring, from a Mobley cross and a "grand shot" by Wheldon, but went two goals behind, before Haddon's second-half score left 20 minutes for the visitors to try in vain for an equaliser. The annual theatrical sports, run by the Small Heath club in association with the Prince of Wales Theatre, raised £350 after expenses, to be distributed among the local hospitals.

Final First Division table (part)
| Pos | Club | Pld | W | D | L | F | A | Pts |
|---|---|---|---|---|---|---|---|---|
| 14th | Wolverhampton Wanderers | 30 | 10 | 1 | 19 | 61 | 65 | 21 |
| 15th | Small Heath | 30 | 8 | 4 | 18 | 39 | 79 | 20 |
| 16th | West Bromwich Albion | 30 | 6 | 7 | 17 | 30 | 59 | 19 |
| Key | Pos = League position; Pld = Matches played; W = Matches won; D = Matches drawn; L = Matches lost; F = Goals for; A = Goals against; Pts = Points | | | | | | | |
| Source | | | | | | | | |

Only around 500 spectators watched Small Heath lose 4–3 to Notts County of the Second Division in a friendly on a miserably wet day, the small attendance meaning that the home side would have lost money on the arrangement after paying Notts their guarantee. A game of two halves followed at Burnley on Good Friday; playing with the wind, Robertson opened the scoring for the visitors after four minutes and several shots hit the woodwork, but on change of ends Burnley forced the pace and had a goal disallowed before scoring the equaliser. The next day, Sheffield Wednesday took a 3–0 half-time lead playing into the sun and wind. Perhaps with the approaching FA Cup Final on their minds, they took it easy in the second half, but a weakened Small Heath team, with Fountain, Jones and Pratt replacing Hands, Haddon and Lester, were still unable to score. The Sheffield Independent picked out Leake at centre half as playing excellently, and the full-backs Oliver and Pratt as "safe, but not too speedy". On Easter Monday, a goalless draw at West Bromwich Albion, thanks largely to Joe Fall and his defence, kept Small Heath out of the bottom two places with two games left to play.

Small Heath dominated the play against Sheffield United, but visiting goalkeeper William Foulke was on fine form, and his team had a one-goal lead at the interval. Mobley scored twice in the second half, and both were in controversial circumstances. After a United defender won the ball from Tommy Hands, Hands kicked out at him; the referee turned to have a quick word with Hands, meanwhile the ball fell to Mobley, standing in an offside position, who put it in the net, and the referee, who had not seen Mobley's offside, awarded the goal. Encouraged by this stroke of luck, Small Heath pressed, and from a Leake cross, Wheldon executed an overhead kick from which the ball rebounded off the crossbar to Mobley, again standing offside, who tapped it in for the winning goal. The victory left them needing only a draw from the final match of the season, at home to Sunderland, to avoid the test matches. In the event, they were outclassed. Though as usual the defence was satisfactory, the forwards' positioning was poor, Hallam and Walton were sadly missed, and they lacked anyone of influence to organise them. A 1–0 defeat, combined with Wolverhampton's 5–0 thrashing of Bolton Wanderers, confirmed Small Heath's participation in the test matches.

=== Test matches ===
The format was that of a four-team league, in which each would play the two teams from the other division on a home-and-away basis. Small Heath's campaign began at Liverpool, whose forwards were restricted to one goal in the first half through the efforts of Lester and Oliver, but in the second, the Liverpool Mercury's report that "the whole of the play was confined to the visitors' quarters" was little of an exaggeration as the home side won 4–0. In the home match, Hallam and Walton came in for Mobley and Farnall. Small Heath came close to conceding when Tom Bradshaw spotted Meates off his line, but Jack Oliver got back in time to clear. They had more of the play, with Wheldon was particularly dangerous in attack, and threw caution to the winds as full-time approached, but the game finished goalless. A 3–0 defeat at Manchester City confirmed Small Heath's relegation to the Second Division for the 1896–97 season. Meates opened the scoring for City when he sliced the ball into his own net in attempting a clearance, and after Hallam failed to take a good chance in the first half and struck the crossbar in the second as the visitors tried hard to equalise, City scored twice more towards the end of the match. For the last test match, at home to Manchester City, Small Heath selected Thomas Dunlop and Walter Abbott instead of Oliver and Hands. Small Heath had all of the play, "shots without number" were attempted but only one was scored by half-time. They scored a further seven in the second half, with hat-tricks for Jones and Wheldon and a goal on debut for Abbott.

== Summary and aftermath ==
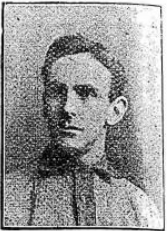
Fred Wheldon scored 116 goals from 175 matches for Small Heath.

After opening their campaign with six defeats, Small Heath spent most of the season in the bottom two positions. They conceded more goals than any other team in the division for the second consecutive season, and scored fewer than all but bottom club West Bromwich Albion. The directors came under criticism for failing to improve the team and for their selection policy: making too many changes to the team from one game to the next, and playing men when they were unfit. A draw from the final match of the season, at home to Sunderland, would have secured their First Division status for another year, but they lost, finished 15th of the 16 teams, and were relegated via the test matches. The League's Annual General Meeting heard proposals from Small Heath F.C. that the First Division be expanded to 18 teams, and that a two-thirds majority be sufficient to carry a motion rather than three-quarters. Both motions were lost, thus confirming that the team would play in the Second Division for the 1896–97 season.

The average league attendance remained steady in the low 6,000s, although the highest attendance was 10,000, compared with 15,000 the previous season. The balance sheet showed expenditure of £4,158, of which players' wages, bonuses and transfer fees accounted for £2,536. During the season the club bought the lease of the Coventry Road ground, which had 11 years remaining, and made improvements to the standing accommodation. Most of the club's income came from net gate receipts of £3,733, and the club lost £185 on the year to 30 April. Both income and expenditure had doubled over the last two years.

The Nottinghamshire Guardian suggested Small Heath would "have to greatly improve their present team if they are to make a very prominent display even in [the second] division next season." Harry Haynes moved on to Southern League club Southampton St Mary's, Ted Devey left for Burton Wanderers, and Adam Fraser returned to Scotland, but the major loss was that of Fred Wheldon. Wheldon had scored 116 goals from 175 matches in league and FA Cup for Small Heath, and the only match he missed in six seasons was when his sister died on the morning of the game. He joined local rivals and League champions Aston Villa for a fee which, after much speculation, was confirmed at Small Heath's Annual General Meeting as £350 guaranteed, plus the proceeds of a match to be played between the two clubs. The £350 fee was reported to be a transfer record. He went on to win three Football League titles with Aston Villa, including a League and FA Cup double in his first season with the club, topped the First Division scoring charts in 1897–98, and scored six goals in four games for the England national team.

== Match details ==
For consistency, attendances and goalscorers' names in the League and FA Cup match details tables are sourced from Matthews' Complete Record. Information in contemporary newspaper reports could, and often did, differ. League positions are sourced from League positions are sourced from 11v11.com.

=== Football League First Division ===
| Date | League position | Opponents | Venue | Result | Score F–A | Scorers | Attendance |
|---|---|---|---|---|---|---|---|
| 2 September 1895 | 14th | Sheffield United | A | L | 0–2 | | 6,000 |
| 7 September 1895 | 14th | Aston Villa | A | L | 3–7 | Walton, Mobley, Hands | 13,000 |
| 14 September 1895 | 14th | Stoke | H | L | 1–2 | Hallam | 7,500 |
| 21 September 1895 | 15th | Nottingham Forest | A | L | 0–3 | | 6,000 |
| 28 September 1895 | 16th | Bolton Wanderers | H | L | 1–2 | Mobley | 4,500 |
| 5 October 1895 | 16th | Preston North End | A | L | 2–3 | Mobley 2 | 2,000 |
| 12 October 1895 | 16th | Bury | H | W | 5–4 | Wheldon 2, Mobley 2, Jones | 6,000 |
| 19 October 1895 | 16th | Stoke | A | L | 1–6 | Jones | 8,000 |
| 26 October 1895 | 16th | Aston Villa | H | L | 1–4 | Jones | 10,000 |
| 9 November 1895 | 16th | Nottingham Forest | H | W | 1–0 | Mobley | 5,000 |
| 23 November 1895 | 15th | Preston North End | H | W | 5–2 | Wheldon 2, Jones, Mobley | 5,000 |
| 30 November 1895 | 16th | Derby County | A | L | 0–8 | | 8,000 |
| 7 December 1895 | 16th | Everton | A | L | 0–3 | | 3,000 |
| 14 December 1895 | 16th | Sunderland | A | L | 1–2 | Wheldon | 4,000 |
| 21 December 1895 | 16th | West Bromwich Albion | H | D | 2–2 | Bruce, Adlington | 6,000 |
| 26 December 1895 | 16th | Burnley | H | W | 1–0 | Adlington | 5,500 |
| 4 January 1896 | 16th | Derby County | H | L | 1–3 | Adlington | 10,000 |
| 18 January 1896 | 15th | Wolverhampton Wanderers | H | W | 3–2 | Adlington, Bruce, Ollis | 6,000 |
| 25 January 1896 | 15th | Wolverhampton Wanderers | A | L | 2–7 | Wheldon, Mobley | 4,000 |
| 3 February 1896 | 15th | Everton | A | L | 0–3 | | 8,000 |
| 8 February 1896 | 15th | The Wednesday | H | D | 1–1 | Leake | 5,000 |
| 22 February 1896 | 16th | Bolton Wanderers | A | L | 1–4 | Mobley | 7,000 |
| 29 February 1896 | 15th | Blackburn Rovers | H | W | 2–1 | Robertson, Wheldon | 7,000 |
| 7 March 1896 | 14th | Bury | H | W | 1–0 | Haddon | 5,000 |
| 21 March 1896 | 14th | Blackburn Rovers | A | L | 1–2 | Haddon | 5,000 |
| 3 April 1896 | 15th | Burnley | A | D | 1–1 | Robertson | 8,000 |
| 4 April 1896 | 15th | The Wednesday | A | L | 0–3 | | 6,000 |
| 6 April 1896 | 14th | West Bromwich Albion | A | D | 0–0 | | 3,750 |
| 7 April 1896 | 14th | Sheffield United | H | W | 2–1 | Mobley 2 | 6,000 |
| 11 April 1896 | 15th | Sunderland | H | L | 0–1 | | 8,000 |

=== Test matches ===
| Date | Opponents | Venue | Result | Score F–A | Scorers | Attendance |
|---|---|---|---|---|---|---|
| 18 April 1896 | Liverpool | A | L | 0–4 | | 20,000 |
| 20 April 1896 | Liverpool | H | D | 0–0 | | 5,000 |
| 25 April 1896 | Manchester City | A | L | 0–3 | | 9,000 |
| 27 April 1896 | Manchester City | H | W | 8–0 | Jones 3, Wheldon 3, Abbott, Hallam | 2,000 |

=== FA Cup ===
| Round | Date | Opponents | Venue | Result | Score F–A | Scorers | Attendance |
|---|---|---|---|---|---|---|---|
| 1st | 2 February 1896 | Bury | H | L | 1–4 | Lewis | 15,000 |

=== Birmingham Senior Cup ===
| Round | Date | Opponents | Venue | Result | Score F–A | Scorers | Attendance | Ref |
|---|---|---|---|---|---|---|---|---|
| 1st | 13 January 1896 | Sheffield Wednesday | Olive Grove, Sheffield | L | 1–2 | Adlington | ~2,000 | |

=== Staffordshire Senior Cup ===
| Round | Date | Opponents | Venue | Result | Score F–A | Scorers | Attendance | Ref |
|---|---|---|---|---|---|---|---|---|
| 1st | 6 January 1896 | West Bromwich Albion | Stoney Lane, West Bromwich | L | 1–2 | Tommy Hands | Not known | |

=== Other matches ===
| Date | Opponents | Venue | Result | Score F–A | Scorers | Attendance | Notes |
|---|---|---|---|---|---|---|---|
| 14 October 1895 | Aston Villa | H | L | 1–3 | Billy Walton | ~1,500 | Benefit match for Ted Devey |
| 3 November 1895 | Leyton | A | W | 8–3 | Not known (8) | ~1,500 | Friendly match |
| 25 November 1892 | Walsall | A | L | 2–3 | Mobley, Deeley | 600–700 | Benefit match for Sam Holmes (Walsall) |
| 15 February 1896 | Aston Villa | A | L | 1–2 | Not known | 5,000 | Friendly match |
| 14 March 1896 | Leicester Fosse | A | L | 2–3 | Not known, Hallam | Not known | Friendly match |
| 1 April 1896 | Notts County | A | L | 3–4 | Not known (3) | 500 | Friendly match |

== Appearances and goals ==
This table includes appearances and goals in nationally organised competitive matches – the Football League, including test matches, and FA Cup – only.
For a description of the playing positions, see Formation (association football)#2–3–5 (Pyramid).

Players' appearances and goals by competition
| Name | Position | League | | Test match | | FA Cup | | Total | |
| Name | Position | Apps | Goals | Apps | Goals | Apps | Goals | Apps | Goals |
|---|---|---|---|---|---|---|---|---|---|
| Joe Fall | Goalkeeper | 2 | 0 | 0 | 0 | 0 | 0 | 2 | 0 |
| Bill Meates | Goalkeeper | 12 | 0 | 3 | 0 | 0 | 0 | 15 | 0 |
| Charles Partridge | Goalkeeper | 1 | 0 | 0 | 0 | 0 | 0 | 1 | 0 |
| Jim Roach | Goalkeeper | 15 | 0 | 1 | 0 | 1 | 0 | 17 | 0 |
| Thomas Dunlop | Full back | 2 | 0 | 1 | 0 | 0 | 0 | 3 | 0 |
| Frank Lester | Full back | 20 | 0 | 4 | 0 | 1 | 0 | 25 | 0 |
| Lewis Vaughan Lodge | Full back | 1 | 0 | 0 | 0 | 0 | 0 | 1 | 0 |
| John Oliver | Full back | 29 | 0 | 3 | 0 | 1 | 0 | 33 | 0 |
| Billy Pratt | Full back | 1 | 0 | 0 | 0 | 0 | 0 | 1 | 0 |
| Bill Purves | Full back | 7 | 0 | 0 | 0 | 0 | 0 | 7 | 0 |
| Ted Devey | Half back | 3 | 0 | 0 | 0 | 0 | 0 | 3 | 0 |
| Thomas Farnall | Half back | 11 | 0 | 3 | 0 | 1 | 0 | 15 | 0 |
| Adam Fraser | Half back | 19 | 0 | 4 | 0 | 1 | 0 | 24 | 0 |
| Harry Haynes | Half back | 9 | 0 | 0 | 0 | 1 | 0 | 10 | 0 |
| Teddy Jolley | Half back | 11 | 0 | 0 | 0 | 0 | 0 | 11 | 0 |
| Alex Leake | Half back | 14 | 1 | 4 | 0 | 0 | 0 | 18 | 1 |
| Billy Ollis | Half back | 19 | 1 | 0 | 0 | 0 | 0 | 19 | 1 |
| Walter Abbott | Forward | 0 | 0 | 1 | 1 | 0 | 0 | 1 | 1 |
| James Adlington | Forward | 6 | 4 | 0 | 0 | 0 | 0 | 6 | 4 |
| Daniel Bruce | Forward | 9 | 2 | 0 | 0 | 1 | 0 | 10 | 2 |
| James Deeley | Forward | 1 | 0 | 0 | 0 | 0 | 0 | 1 | 0 |
| Joe Fountain | Forward | 1 | 0 | 0 | 0 | 0 | 0 | 1 | 0 |
| Harry Haddon | Forward | 5 | 2 | 0 | 0 | 0 | 0 | 5 | 2 |
| Jack Hallam | Forward | 12 | 1 | 3 | 1 | 0 | 0 | 15 | 2 |
| Tommy Hands | Forward | 25 | 1 | 3 | 0 | 1 | 0 | 29 | 1 |
| Charles Izon | Forward | 6 | 0 | 0 | 0 | 0 | 0 | 6 | 0 |
| Jack Jones | Forward | 14 | 6 | 4 | 3 | 0 | 0 | 18 | 9 |
| Bill Lewis | Forward | 0 | 0 | 0 | 0 | 1 | 1 | 1 | 1 |
| Frank Mobley | Forward | 28 | 11 | 1 | 0 | 0 | 0 | 29 | 11 |
| William Robertson | Forward | 8 | 2 | 4 | 0 | 0 | 0 | 12 | 2 |
| Billy Walton | Forward | 9 | 1 | 1 | 0 | 1 | 0 | 11 | 1 |
| Fred Wheldon | Forward | 30 | 7 | 4 | 3 | 1 | 0 | 35 | 10 |
