= List of Chesterfield F.C. players =

This is a list of notable footballers who have played for Chesterfield.

The aim is for this list to include all players that have played 100 or more Football League matches for the club, as taken from a list provided via the club's website.

For a list of all Chesterfield players with a Wikipedia article, see Category:Chesterfield F.C. players, and for the current squad see Chesterfield F.C.#Current squad.

== Explanation of list ==
Players should be listed in chronological order according to the year in which they first played a Football League match for the club, and then by alphabetical order of their surname. Appearances and goals should include substitute appearances, but exclude wartime matches.

=== Total appearances ===
The figures for total appearances and goals should include the League figures together with ideally the following competitions:

- Play-off matches (1989–90, 1994–95)
- FA Cup
- Football League Cup; Football League Trophy; Football League Third Division North Cup (1933–34 to 1935–36)
- Anglo-Scottish Cup (1980–81), Football League Group Cup/Trophy (1981–82, 1982–83)

== List of players ==
Statistics are up to date as of 29 August 2012.

Name	Position	League career	League apps	League goals	Total apps	Total goals	Notes
Walter Abbott	IL	1920-1921					
Tommy Broome	WH	1921-1926	14	2			
Horace Wass	WH	1924–1937	413	6	447	7	
Norman Whitfield	IL	1922–1926	120	60			
Billy Kidd	DF	1931–1947	316	2	347	2	Oldest Chesterfield player
Jack Hughes	WN	1936–1939	102	17	105	18	
Dave Blakey	DF	1948–1967	617	20	658	21	Record Chesterfield appearances
George Smith	IF	1951–1958	250	98	266	102	
Dennis Thompson	IF	1951–1953?	24	0	24	0	Youngest Chesterfield player
Ron Powell	GK	1952–1964	471	0	508	0	
Gerry Sears	DF	1953–1968	412	4	454	4	
Barry Hutchinson	IF	1955–1960	154	16	161	17	
Albert Holmes	DF	1961–1976	470	10	514	10	
Mike Hughes	MF	1963–1969	210	9			
Kevin Randall	FW	1966–1972	258	96	282	105	Manager of Chesterfield 1987-1988
Ernie Moss	FW	1968–1975, 1979–1981, 1984–1986	469	162	539	192	Record Chesterfield goalscorer
John Archer	MF	1969–1972	116	22	129	24	
Tom Fenoughty	MF	1969–1972	100	15	110	16	
Frank Barlow	DF	1972–1976?	141	3	160	3	Manager of Chesterfield 1980-1983
Phil Tingay	GK	1972–1980	181	0	202	0	
Eric Winstanley	DF	1973–1977	101	7	113	8	
Sean O'Neill	DF	1974–1986	442	6	507	6	
Colin Tartt	MF	1977–1982	186	7	225	9	
Steve Baines	DF	1983–1986	133	9	154	10	
Brian Scrimgeour	MF	1983–1987	121	16	?	?	
Chris Marples	GK	1984–1987, 1992–1995	141	0	160	0	
Jamie Hewitt	MF	1986–1992, 1993–2002	506	26	585	29	
Andy Morris	FW	1988–1998	265	56	320	71	
Sean Dyche	DF	1990–1997	231	8	269	9	
Tom Curtis	MF	1993–2000	240	12	291	13	
Kevin Davies	FW	1993–1997	129	22	159	30	Record transfer fee received (£750,000)
Mark Jules	DF	1993–1999	186	4	226	7	
Nicky Law	DF	1993–1996	111	11	127	13	Manager of Chesterfield 2000-2001
Ian Breckin	DF	1997–2002, 2009–2011	279	8	323	11	
Jason Lee	FW	1998–2000	28	1	32	1	Record transfer fee paid (£250,000)
Lee Richardson	MF	2000–2004	45	1	55	1	Manager of Chesterfield 2007-2009
Derek Niven	MF	2003–2012	297	18	326	21	
Wayne Allison	FW	2004–2008	115	21	127	23	
Jack Lester	FW	2007–2013	197	85	219	94	
Alan O'Hare	DF	2002–2008	154	3	154	3	
