= Charles Hare =

Charles Hare may refer to:

- Charlie Hare (1870–1947), English footballer
- Charles Hare (tennis) (1915–1996), British tennis player
- Charles Simeon Hare (1808–1882), politician in colonial South Australia
- Charles Hare (priest), Anglican priest in Ireland
