= Tingay =

Tingay is a surname. Notable people with the surname include:

- Declan Tingay (born 1999), Australian racewalking athlete
- Lance Tingay (1915–1990), British sports journalist, historian, and author
- Phil Tingay (born 1950), English footballer
- Stephen Tingay (born 1970), Australian rules footballer
- Steven Tingay, Australian astronomer
