= John Logan =

John Logan may refer to:

== People ==
=== Literature ===
- John Logan (minister) (1748–1788), Scottish poet and minister at Leith
- John Logan (poet) (1923–1987), American poet and educator
- John Logan (writer) (John David Logan, born 1961), American screenwriter and playwright

=== Military ===
- John Logan (pioneer) (1747–1807), Indian fighter and first treasurer of the U.S. state of Kentucky
- John A. Logan (John Alexander Logan, 1826–1886), American soldier and politician
- John Alexander Logan Jr. (Manning Alexander Logan, 1865–1899), United States Army major, son of John A. Logan

=== Sport ===
- John Logan (footballer, born 1912) (John William Logan, 1912–1980), English footballer
- John Logan (footballer, born 1871) (John Theodore Logan, 1871–after 1896), Scottish footballer

=== Other people ===
- John Logan (judge) (John Alexander Logan, born 1956), Australian judge
- John "Juke" Logan (John Farrell Logan, 1946–2013), American musician
- John Lee Logan (1848–1890), American lawyer and judge
- John R. Logan (John Richard Logan, born 1946), American sociologist
- Paddy Logan (politician) (John William Logan, 1845–1925), British politician

== Other uses ==
- John Logan, a fictional character in Ian McEwan's 1997 novel Enduring Love and its 2004 film adaptation
- SS John A. Logan, later USS Alnitah, US Navy ship in service during the Second World War

== See also ==
- Jack Logan (disambiguation)
- Johnny Logan (disambiguation)
- Logan (surname)
