= Jack Logan (disambiguation) =

Jack Logan (born 1959) is an American singer-songwriter.

Jack Logan may also refer to:

- Jack Logan (rugby league) (born 1995), rugby league footballer
- Jack Logan (footballer) (1923–2001), Australian rules footballer
- John A. Logan (1826–1886), American soldier and political leader
- Jack Logan (filmmaker) (born 1983), Filipino filmmaker

== See also ==
- John Logan (disambiguation)
