= Tom Fenoughty =

Tom Fenoughty may refer to:

- Tom Fenoughty (footballer, born 1905) (1905–2001), English footballer
- Tom Fenoughty (footballer, born 1941), English footballer
