= Michael Good =

Michael Good may refer to:

- Michael F. Good, Australian medical doctor
- Michael T. Good (born 1962), American NASA astronaut
- Michael Good (footballer) (1875–after 1904), Scottish footballer
- Michael L. Good, 9th Dean of the University of Florida College of Medicine
