= Jim Roach =

Jim or James Roach may refer to:

- Jim Roach (footballer) (1864–1955), English footballer
- Jim Roach (producer) (born 1977), American producer and songwriter
- James Terry Roach (1960–1986), executed by the state of South Carolina
