= Adlington =

Adlington may refer to:

== People ==
- Adlington (surname)

== Places ==
- Adlington, Cheshire
- Adlington, Lancashire
- Adlington Hall, a country house in Cheshire, England
- Adlington Hall, Lancashire, a country house in Lancashire, England

== See also ==
- Aldington (disambiguation)
