= 1915–16 Arsenal F.C. season =

English football club season

The Arsenal
1915–16 season
- Chairman: Henry Norris
- Manager: James McEwen
- London Combination Primary Competition: 3rd
- London Combination Supplementary Competition: 11th

In the 1915–16 season, the Arsenal F.C. played 22 games, of which it won 10, drew 5 and lost 7. The team finished 3rd in the league.

== Results ==
Arsenal's score comes first

Win	Draw	Loss

=== London Combination Primary Competition ===
Date	Opponent	Venue	Result	Attendance	Scorers
4 September 1915	Tottenham Hotspur	H	2–0		
11 September 1915	Crystal Palace	A	1–3		
18 September 1915	Queen's Park Rangers	H	2–1		
25 September 1915	Fulham	A	3–4		
2 October 1915	Clapton Orient	H	2–0		
9 October 1915	Watford	A	0–1		
16 October 1915	Millwall	H	1–1		
23 October 1915	Croydon Common	A	4–1		
30 October 1915	Chelsea	A	1–3		
6 November 1915	Brentford	H	3–1		
13 November 1915	Tottenham Hotspur	A	3–3		
20 November 1915	Crystal Palace	H	2–2		?
27 November 1915	Queen's Park Rangers	A	1–1		
4 December 1915	Fulham	H	2–1		
11 December 1915	Clapton Orient	A	2–0		
18 December 1915	Watford	H	3–1		
25 December 1915	West Ham United	A	2–8		
27 December 1915	West Ham United	H	3–2		
1 January 1916	Millwall	A	0–3		
8 January 1916	Croydon Common	H	4–2		
15 January 1916	Chelsea	H	0–6		
22 January 1916	Brentford	A	2–2		
29 January 1916	Fulham	H	2–0		

==== Primary Competition Final League table ====
Pos	Team	Pld	W	D	L	GF	GA	GR	Pts
1	Chelsea (C)	22	17	3	2	71	18	3.944	37
2	Millwall	22	12	6	4	46	24	1.917	30
3	The Arsenal	22	10	5	7	43	46	0.935	25
4	West Ham United	22	10	4	8	47	35	1.343	24
5	Fulham	22	10	4	8	45	37	1.216	24
6	Tottenham Hotspur	22	8	8	6	38	35	1.086	24
7	Brentford	22	6	8	8	36	40	0.900	20
8	Queen's Park Rangers	22	8	3	11	27	41	0.659	19
9	Crystal Palace	22	8	3	11	35	55	0.636	19
10	Watford	22	8	1	13	37	46	0.804	17
11	Clapton Orient	22	4	6	12	22	44	0.500	14
12	Croydon Common	22	3	5	14	24	50	0.480	11

(C) League Champions

=== London Combination Supplementary Competition ===
Date	Opponent	Venue	Result	Attendance	Scorers
5 February 1916	Watford	H	1–1		
12 February 1916	Brentford	A	1–2		
19 February 1916	Reading	H	4–1		
26 February 1916	Clapton Orient	A	1–1		
4 March 1916	Tottenham Hotspur	H	0–3		
11 March 1916	Millwall	A	0–2		
18 March 1916	Brentford	H	5–2		
25 March 1916	Reading	A	1–1		
1 April 1916	Clapton Orient	H	2–1		
8 April 1916	Tottenham Hotspur	A	2–3		
15 April 1916	Millwall	H	0–0		
21 April 1916	Chelsea	A	0–9		
24 April 1916	Chelsea	H	1–3		
29 April 1916	Watford	A	1–2		

==== Supplementary Competition Final League table ====
Pos	Team	Pld	W	D	L	GF	GA	GR	Pts
1	Chelsea (C)	14	10	1	3	50	15	3.333	21
2	West Ham United	14	9	2	3	32	16	2.000	20
3	Tottenham Hotspur	14	8	3	3	32	22	1.455	19
4	Fulham	14	9	0	5	38	19	2.000	18
5	Millwall	14	8	2	4	30	22	1.364	18
6	Crystal Palace	14	8	2	4	41	29	1.414	18
7	Watford	14	5	3	6	22	20	1.100	13
8	Brentford	14	5	2	7	29	33	0.879	12
9	Croydon Common	14	4	3	7	28	27	1.037	11
10	Clapton Orient	14	3	4	7	17	27	0.630	10
11	The Arsenal	14	3	4	7	19	31	0.613	10
12	Luton Town	14	4	1	9	31	44	0.705	9
13	Queen's Park Rangers	14	2	5	7	14	37	0.378	9
14	Reading	14	3	2	9	23	64	0.359	8

(C) League Champions
