= 1916–17 Arsenal F.C. season =

English football club season

The Arsenal
1916–17 season
- Chairman: Henry Norris
- Manager: James McEwen
- London Combination: 5th

In the 1916–17 season, the Arsenal F.C. played 40 games, of which it won 19, drew 10 and lost 11. The team finished 5th in the league.

== Results ==
Arsenal's score comes first

Win	Draw	Loss

=== London Combination ===
Selected results from the league.

Date	Opponent	Venue	Result	Attendance	Scorers
2 September 1916	West Ham United	A	1–2		
9 September 1916	Tottenham Hotspur	H	1–1		
16 September 1916	Crystal Palace	A	0–1		
23 September 1916	Brentford	H	0–0		
30 September 1916	Chelsea	A	0–3		
7 October 1916	Southampton	H	3–3		
14 October 1916	Luton Town	H	2–1		
21 October 1916	Portsmouth	A	0–1		
28 October 1916	Millwall	H	1–0		
4 November 1916	Watford	A	4–2		
11 November 1916	Clapton Orient	H	4–0		
18 November 1916	Fulham	A	0–2		
25 November 1916	West Ham United	H	0–2		
2 December 1916	Tottenham Hotspur	A	1–4		
9 December 1916	Crystal Palace	H	1–2		
23 December 1916	Chelsea	H	2–1		
25 December 1916	Queen's Park Rangers	A	3–2		
26 December 1916	Queen's Park Rangers	H	0–0		
30 December 1916	Southampton	A	1–0		
6 January 1917	Luton Town	A	4–1		
13 January 1917	Portsmouth	H	1–0		
20 January 1917	Millwall	A	0–1		
27 January 1917	Watford	H	1–1		
3 February 1917	Clapton Orient	A	2–2		
10 February 1917	Fulham	H	3–2		
17 February 1917	Chelsea	H	3–0		
24 February 1917	Southampton	A	2–0		
3 March 1917	Clapton Orient	H	3–1		
10 March 1917	West Ham United	A	3–2		
17 March 1917	Crystal Palace	A	0–1		
24 March 1917	Portsmouth	H	2–1		
31 March 1917	Chelsea	A	0–2		
6 April 1917	Tottenham Hotspur	A	0–0		
7 April 1917	Southampton	H	2–2		
9 April 1917	Tottenham Hotspur	H	3–2		
14 April 1917	Clapton Orient	A	3–1		
21 April 1917	West Ham United	H	2–1		
26 April 1917	Brentford	A	0–0		
28 April 1917	Crystal Palace	H	4–0		

==== Final League table ====
Pos	Team	Pld	W	D	L	GF	GA	GR	Pts
1	West Ham United (C)	40	30	5	5	110	45	2.444	65
2	Millwall	40	26	6	8	85	48	1.771	58
3	Chelsea	40	24	5	11	93	48	1.938	53
4	Tottenham Hotspur	40	24	5	11	93	48	1.938	53
5	The Arsenal	40	19	10	11	62	47	1.319	48
6	Fulham	40	21	3	16	102	63	1.619	45
7	Luton Town	39	20	3	16	101	82	1.232	43
8	Crystal Palace	38	14	7	17	68	72	0.944	35
9	Southampton	39	13	8	18	57	80	0.713	34
10	Queen's Park Rangers	39	10	9	20	48	86	0.558	29
11	Watford	39	8	9	22	69	115	0.600	25
12	Brentford	40	9	7	24	56	99	0.566	25
13	Portsmouth	40	9	4	27	58	117	0.496	22
14	Clapton Orient	40	6	7	27	49	104	0.471	19

(C) League Champions
