= 1917–18 Arsenal F.C. season =

English football club season

The Arsenal
1917–18 season
- Chairman: Henry Norris
- Manager: James McEwen
- London Combination: 5th

In the 1917–18 season, the Arsenal F.C. played 36 games, of which it won 16, drew 5 and lost 15. The team finished 5th in the league.

== Results ==
Arsenal's score comes first

Win	Draw	Loss

=== London Combination ===
Selected results from the league.

Date	Opponent	Venue	Result	Attendance	Scorers
1 September 1917	Queen's Park Rangers	H	2–0		
8 September 1917	Clapton Orient	A	0–5		
15 September 1917	Millwall	H	4–0		
22 September 1917	Tottenham Hotspur	A	2–1		
29 September 1917	Chelsea	H	0–1		
6 October 1917	Brentford	A	2–2		
13 October 1917	Crystal Palace	A	0–2		
20 October 1917	West Ham United	H	2–2		
27 October 1917	Queen's Park Rangers	A	0–2		
3 November 1917	Clapton Orient	H	3–1		
10 November 1917	Millwall	A	2–2		
17 November 1917	Tottenham Hotspur	H	0–1		
24 November 1917	Chelsea	A	3–4		
1 December 1917	Brentford	H	4–1		
8 December 1917	Crystal Palace	H	0–2		
15 December 1917	West Ham United	A	2–3		
22 December 1917	Queen's Park Rangers	H	3–0		
25 December 1917	Fulham	A	1–1		
26 December 1917	Fulham	H	1–1		
29 December 1917	Clapton Orient	A	2–1		
5 January 1918	Millwall	H	1–0		
12 January 1918	Tottenham Hotspur	A	1–4		
19 January 1918	Chelsea	H	4–1		
26 January 1918	Brentford	A	2–3		
2 February 1918	Crystal Palace	A	4–1		
9 February 1918	Fulham	H	0–3		
16 February 1918	Queen's Park Rangers	A	3–0		
23 February 1918	Clapton Orient	H	7–1		
2 March 1918	Millwall	A	3–0		
9 March 1918	Tottenham Hotspur	H	4–1		
16 March 1918	Chelsea	A	4–2		
23 March 1918	Brentford	H	1–3		
29 March 1918	West Ham United	A	4–1		
30 March 1918	Crystal Palace	H	3–0		
1 April 1918	West Ham United	H	1–3		
6 April 1918	Fulham	A	1–2		

==== Final league table ====
Pos	Team	Pld	W	D	L	GF	GA	GR	Pts
1	Chelsea (C)	36	21	8	7	82	39	2.103	50
2	West Ham United	36	20	9	7	103	51	2.020	49
3	Fulham	36	20	7	9	75	60	1.250	47
4	Tottenham Hotspur	36	22	2	12	86	56	1.536	46
5	The Arsenal	36	16	5	15	76	57	1.333	37
6	Brentford	36	16	3	17	81	94	0.862	35
7	Crystal Palace	36	13	4	19	54	83	0.651	30
8	Queen's Park Rangers	36	14	2	20	20	48	0.417	30
9	Millwall	36	12	4	20	52	74	0.703	28
10	Clapton Orient	36	2	4	30	34	104	0.327	8

(C) League Champions
