= Johnny Logan =

Johnny Logan may refer to:

- Johnny Logan (baseball) (1926–2013), American baseball player
- Johnny Logan (basketball) (1921–1977), American basketball player
- Johnny Logan (singer) (born 1954), Australian-born Irish singer
- Johnny "Guitar" Logan, main character in the film Johnny Guitar

== See also ==
- John Logan (disambiguation)
- Jonny Logan, an Italian humorous comic strip series
