= William Meates =

English footballer (1875–1910)

Personal information
- Full name: William Percival Meates
- Date of birth: 1875
- Place of birth: Bournemouth, England
- Date of death: 1910 (aged 35)
- Place of death: Eastbourne, Sussex, England
- Position: Goalkeeper

Senior career*
Years	Team	Apps	(Gls)
1894–1895	Eastbourne		
1895–1897	Small Heath	14	(0)
1897–1???	Warmley		
- * Club domestic league appearances and goals

William Percival Meates (1875–1910) was an English professional footballer who made 14 appearances in the Football League playing for Small Heath. He played as a goalkeeper.

Meates was born in Bournemouth, which was then in Hampshire. He began his football career with Eastbourne before joining Small Heath in 1895. He took over from Jim Roach as first-team goalkeeper in the middle of the 1895–96 season after the club had suffered some heavy defeats. Meates made his debut on 3 February 1896 in a 3–0 defeat at Everton, and retained the starting place for the remainder of the season, but failed to stop the rot sufficiently for Small Heath to avoid relegation via the test match system. He played only twice the next season, having surrendered the goalkeeper's jersey to Ernest Pointer, and left for Warmley of the Southern League in 1897. The following year he had an unsuccessful trial with Nottingham Forest.
