= Aldington =

Aldington may refer to:

- Aldington, Kent, a village SE of Ashford, England
- Aldington, Worcestershire, a village east of Evesham, England

== People with the surname ==
- Richard Aldington (1892–1962), English writer and poet
- Toby Low, 1st Baron Aldington (1914–2000), British soldier, politician and businessman
- Charles Low, 2nd Baron Aldington (born 1948), British banker

== See also ==
- Adlington (disambiguation)
