= James Higgins (footballer) =

English footballer

Personal information
- Full name: James Higgins
- Date of birth: 1874
- Place of birth: Cradley Heath, England
- Date of death: Unknown
- Position: Centre forward

Senior career*
Years	Team	Apps	(Gls)
- Stourbridge
1897–1898	Small Heath	6	(3)
1898–1900	Netherton		
1900–19??	Halesowen Town		
- * Club domestic league appearances and goals

James Higgins (1874 – after 1899) was an English professional footballer who played in the Football League for Small Heath. Born in Cradley Heath, Staffordshire, Higgins played local football for Stourbridge before joining Small Heath in 1897. A centre forward, he made his debut in the Second Division on 2 April 1898 in a 2–1 win at Luton Town. He kept his place for the remaining five games of the 1897–98 season, and scored three goals, but when the club signed Bob McRoberts he decided his future lay back in non-league football.
