= Adlington (surname) =

Adlington is a surname. Notable people with the surname include:

- James Adlington (1872–after 1896), English footballer
- Rebecca Adlington (born 1989), English swimmer
- Sarah Adlington (born 1986), British judoka
- Terry Adlington (1935–1994), English footballer
- William Adlington (fl. 1566), English translator
