= Joe Fall =

English footballer

Personal information
- Full name: Joseph William Fall
- Date of birth: 28 January 1872
- Place of birth: Miles Platting, Manchester, England
- Date of death: February 1945 (age 73)
- Height: 5 ft 11 in (1.80 m)
- Position: Goalkeeper

Senior career*
Years	Team	Apps	(Gls)
- Redcar and Coatham
- Middlesbrough
1893–1894	Newton Heath	23	(0)
- South Shore
- Kettering
1895–1896	Small Heath	2	(0)
- Altrincham
- Stockton
- * Club domestic league appearances and goals

Joseph William Fall (28 January 1872 – unknown) was an English footballer who played as a goalkeeper. Born in the Miles Platting area of Manchester, he played for Redcar and Coatham, Middlesbrough, Newton Heath, South Shore, Kettering, Small Heath, Altrincham and Stockton.

== Career ==
Fall was born in Miles Platting, Manchester, but grew up in Redcar, North Yorkshire, where his father, George, was the proprietor of the Jolly Sailor Hotel. He began his football career with Redcar and Coatham, whom he helped to the Cleveland Junior Cup in 1890, after which he was promoted to the first team. He made guest appearances for Whitby in 1891, before signing for Middlesbrough a year later.

In August 1893, Fall returned to the city of his birth when he signed for Football League First Division side Newton Heath. He played in 23 of the club's 30 league fixtures that season, as well as three FA Cup matches, including the 4–0 victory over former club Middlesbrough in the first round. He also kept a clean sheet in a goalless draw at home to Blackburn Rovers in the second round, but was unable to prevent Blackburn winning 5–1 in the replay. Newton Heath finished bottom of the First Division and played a test match against Liverpool on 28 April 1894 in an attempt to preserve their status in the division; despite Fall playing one of his best games for the club, Newton Heath lost the match 2–0 and were not re-elected to the First Division.

Now in the Second Division, Newton Heath did not believe they could offer Fall suitable terms for re-signing, and he was placed on the transfer list at a valuation of £60. When this was not met, Fall signed with Blackpool-based Lancashire League club South Shore in October 1894. After a few games for South Shore, he joined Midland Football League side Kettering for the remainder of the 1894–95 season. In May 1895, he returned to the Football League First Division, signing for Small Heath for a fee of £20, paid to Newton Heath; however, injury meant he appeared in just two matches all season. At the end of the season, he placed adverts in various newspapers in search of a new club and eventually signed for Altrincham. His last recorded club was back in the north-east at Stockton.

== Career statistics ==
Appearances and goals by club, season and competition
Club	Season	League			Cup		Other		Total	
Club	Season	Division	Apps	Goals	Apps	Goals	Apps	Goals	Apps	Goals
Newton Heath	1893–94	Football League First Division	23	0	3	0	1	0	27	0
Small Heath	1895–96	Football League First Division	2	0	0	0	0	0	2	0
Total			25	0	3	0	1	0	29	0
