= Harry Williams (footballer, born 1875) =

English footballer

Personal information
- Full name: Harry Williams
- Place of birth: Birmingham, England
- Position: Right back

Senior career*
Years	Team	Apps	(Gls)
- Aston Unity
- Aston Manor
1896–1897	Small Heath	1	(0)
–	Nechells		
- * Club domestic league appearances and goals

Harry Williams (1875 – after 1896) was an English professional footballer who played in the Football League for Small Heath.

Williams was born in Aston, which is now part of Birmingham, and played local football before joining Small Heath in April 1896. He made his debut in the Second Division on 13 March 1897, deputising for regular right back Frank Lester in a game at Lincoln City which Small Heath won 3–1. This was the only competitive first-team game that Williams played for the club before he returned to local football with Nechells.
