= Jack Logan (filmmaker) =

Filipino vlogger and filmmaker

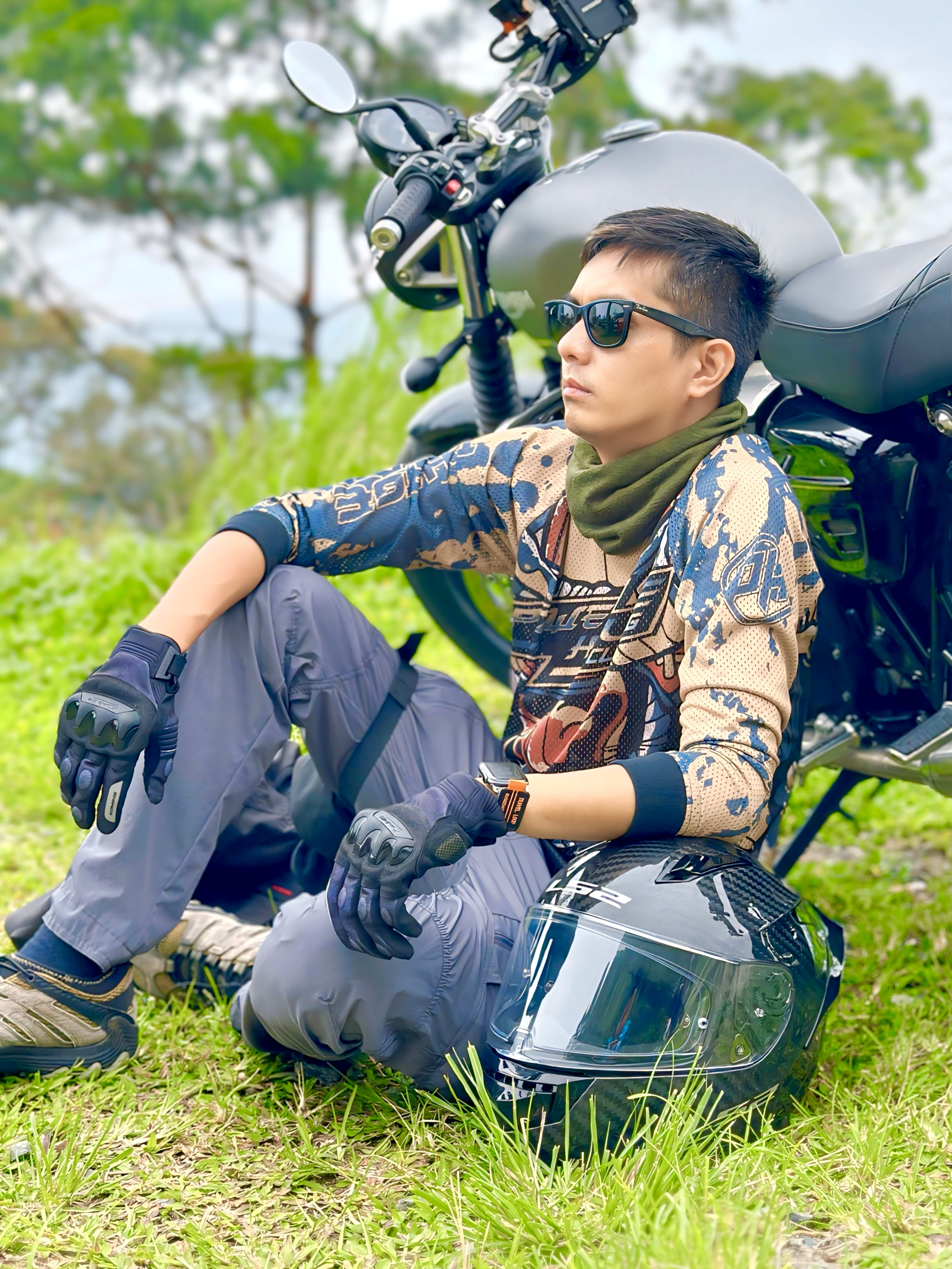
- Jack Logan in 2024
- Born: Cris Jason Santos; March 30, 1983 (age 43)
- Other name: CJ Santos
- Education: Lyceum of the Philippines (Communication Arts)
- Occupations: YouTuber; vlogger; filmmaker; actor; writer; novelist
- Known for: Jack Logan Realtalks; Makabagong San Juan; The 12 Days Saga
- Awards: Nominee, 28th Asian Television Awards (2023); Breakthrough Vlogger of the Year, Philippine Golden Eagle Awards (2023)

YouTube information
- Channel: Jack Logan
- Years active: 2013–present
- Genres: Comedy; Vlog; travel
- Subscribers: 164,000
- Views: 22,000,000
- Last updated: August 2025

Cris Jason "Jack Logan" Santos (born March 30, 1983) is a Filipino filmmaker, writer, novelist, vlogger and YouTuber. He is known for the social-media program Jack Logan Realtalks and the short documentary Makabagong San Juan, which earned a nomination at the 28th Asian Television Awards for Best Single Digital Programme/Short Film.

He has also been recognized in his home province of San Antonio, Zambales for contributions to film and digital media.

== Early life and education ==
Santos was born in Marikina, Philippines, and raised in San Antonio, Zambales. He studied Communication Arts at Lyceum of the Philippines (listed via his industry profile).

== Career ==
=== Social media ===
In late 2023, his program #JackLoganRealTalks began airing on Teletabloid/Abante platforms.

In August 2025, Logan criticized alleged corruption in government flood control projects, using his social media platforms to call for accountability and reforms.

In 2026, Logan revived #JackLoganRealtalks as a short-form social commentary series presented primarily in vertical video format and covering social, economic, and political issues in the Philippines. The series uses humor and satire in discussing public and political issues.

=== Film ===
Logan directed the viral trilogy collectively known as The 12 Days Saga (credited as CJ Santos), and has been cited in the Philippine press for its large online viewership.

In 2023, Logan’s short documentary Makabagong San Juan was nominated for Best Single Digital Programme/Short Film at the 28th Asian Television Awards.

Known for his satirical takes on social issues, Logan shifted toward more hard-hitting content. In April 2025, Logan announced his documentary, "Sa Gitna ng Dalawang Tubig," which explores the lives of Filipino fishermen caught between territorial conflict and survival in the West Philippine Sea.

=== Literature ===
In 2026, Logan made his debut as a novelist with The Pabebe Chronicles: The Flower and the Warrior, his first published novel. The Filipino-language fantasy-comedy is the first published installment of a planned trilogy. Logan began developing The Pabebe Chronicles in 2015.

== Filmography ==
According to press profiles, Jack Logan (credited variously as CJ Santos and Jack Logan) has contributed to a diverse range of film and documentary projects—from short-form films to full-length documentaries—marking his evolution from radio content to cinematic storytelling.

=== As director and writer ===
Year	Title	Type	Role(s)	Credit	Awards / Notes
2018	Ang Luha at Lualhati ni Jeronima	Short film	Director, Writer (story), editor, producer	CJ Santos	
2019	12 Days to Destiny	Feature film	Director, writer, editor	CJ Santos	Covered in Liwayway and Bisaya magazines, noting CJ Santos as director
2021	The Next 12 Days	Feature film	Director, writer, editor	CJ Santos	Mentioned in ABS-CBN Entertainment review and Manila Standard feature
2023	Makabagong San Juan	Short documentary	Director, writer, Host	Jack Logan	Nominated – Best Single Digital Programme/Short Film, 28th Asian Television Awards (2023)
2023	Damong Ligal	Documentary	Director, writer, producer, Host	Jack Logan	
2024	The Last 12 Days	Feature film	Director, writer, editor	CJ Santos	Reported in Hataw! and People's Balita as directed by CJ Santos (Jack Logan)
2025	Sa Gitna ng Dalawang Tubig (In Between Waters)	Documentary (In production)	Director, writer, narrator	Jack Logan	

=== As actor and host ===
Year	Title	Type	Role	Credit
2018	Ang Luha at Lualhati ni Jeronima	Short film	Pepe	CJ Santos
2023	Damong Ligal	Documentary	Himself (host/interviewer)	Jack Logan
2023	Makabagong San Juan	Short documentary	Himself (host/presenter)	Jack Logan
2024	Boy Kaldag	Feature film	Actor (supporting role)	Jack Logan
2025	Sa Gitna ng Dalawang Tubig (In Between Waters)	Documentary (In production)	Himself (narrator/on-screen)	Jack Logan
