= Jack Kirton =

English footballer

Personal information
- Full name: John William Kirton
- Date of birth: 18 July 1871
- Place of birth: Hulme, England
- Date of death: 13 March 1939 (aged 67)
- Place of death: Kilburn, London, England
- Position: Outside left

Senior career*
Years	Team	Apps	(Gls)
- Glossop North End
- Oldham County
1896–1897	Lincoln City	27	(5)
1897–1898	Small Heath	18	(2)
1898–1899	Swindon Town	22	(7)
1899–1900	Sunderland	0	(0)
1900–1901	Swindon Town	23	(4)
1901–19??	Millwall Athletic		
- * Club domestic league appearances and goals

John William Kirton (18 July 1871 – 13 March 1939) was an English professional footballer who made 45 appearances in the Football League playing for Lincoln City and Small Heath. He played as an outside left.

Kirton was born in Hulme, which was then in Lancashire. He played for Glossop North End and Oldham County of the Combination before joining Football League Second Division club Lincoln City in May 1896. From then on, he changed club at the end of each season. With Small Heath in the Second Division, he created many of Walter Abbott's 19 goals in the 1897–98 season. His next move was to Swindon Town of the Southern League, then First Division club Sunderland, where he never achieved a first-team place. A return to Swindon preceded a final move in the 1901 close season, this time to Millwall Athletic, also of the Southern League.

He died in Kilburn, London, in 1939 at the age of 67.
