= Jack Logan (footballer) =

Australian rules footballer (1923–2001)

Personal information
- Full name: John Andrew Logan
- Born: 14 December 1923; Torrita, Victoria, Australia
- Died: 22 December 2001 (aged 78)
- Original team: Torrita
- Height: 185 cm (6 ft 1 in)
- Weight: 80 kg (176 lb)

Playing career^{1}
Years	Club	Games (Goals)
1946–48	Footscray	31 (14)
- ^{1} Playing statistics correct to the end of 1948.

John Andrew Logan (14 December 1923 – 22 December 2001) was an Australian rules footballer who played with Footscray in the Victorian Football League (VFL).
