= James Deeley =

English footballer (1871–c.1895)

Personal information
- Full name: James Deeley
- Date of birth: 1871
- Place of birth: Evesham, England
- Date of death: Unknown
- Place of death: Worcester, England
- Position: Outside left

Senior career*
Years	Team	Apps	(Gls)
- Worcester Rovers
1895–1896	Small Heath	1	(0)
1896–1???	Hereford Thistle		
- * Club domestic league appearances and goals

James Deeley (1871 – after 1895) was an English professional footballer who played in the Football League for Small Heath. Born in Evesham, Worcestershire, Deeley played for Worcester Rovers before joining Small Heath in August 1895. An outside left, Deeley played only once for Small Heath, in the First Division on 6 April 1896, deputising for Tommy Hands in a game at West Bromwich Albion which finished goalless, before he returned to non-league football with Hereford Thistle. He died in Worcester.
