= Steven Tingay =

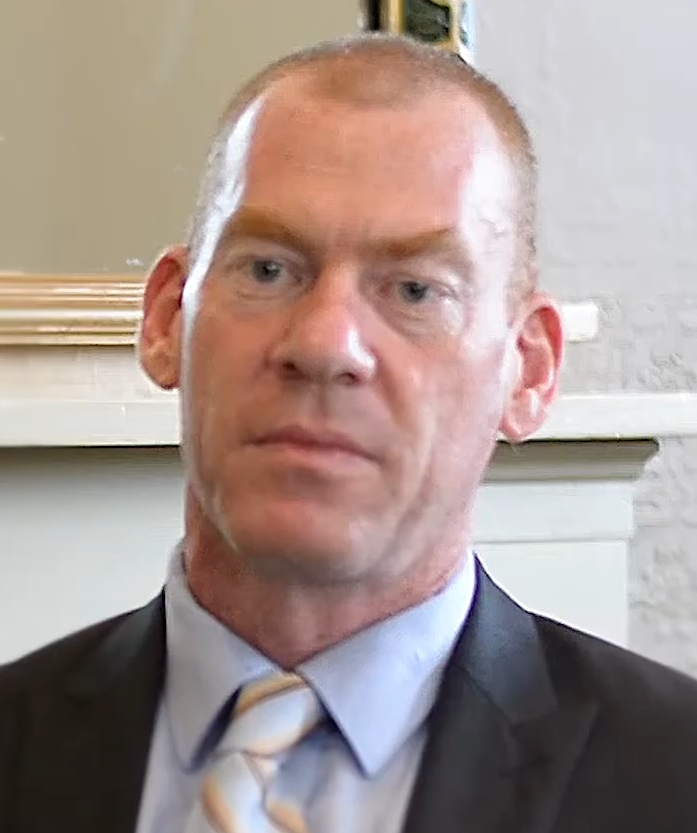
Steven Tingay in 2015

Steven Tingay is a John Curtin Distinguished Professor at Curtin University and deputy executive director of the International Centre for Radio Astronomy Research. He is a specialist in radio astronomy and astrophysics.
