= Jim Roach (footballer) =

English footballer (1864–1955)

Personal information
- Full name: James Roach
- Date of birth: 12 January 1864
- Place of birth: West Bromwich, England
- Date of death: 1955 (aged 90–91)
- Place of death: Birmingham, England
- Position: Goalkeeper

Senior career*
Years	Team	Apps	(Gls)
- Small Heath Royal
- 2nd Dragoon Guards
1892–1895	Unity Gas		
1895–1896	Small Heath	15	(0)
1896–1897	Hereford Town		
1897–1???	Bristol Eastville Rovers		
- * Club domestic league appearances and goals

James Roach (12 January 1864 – 1955) was an English professional footballer who made 15 appearances in the First Division of the Football League playing for Small Heath. Jim Roach was born in West Bromwich, Staffordshire and played as a goalkeeper.

Roach played football for local clubs and in the army before joining Small Heath in 1895 by which time he was over 30, although he claimed to have been born in 1870. He made his debut on 7 September 1895 in a 7–3 defeat at Aston Villa, and retained the starting place for a run of games which included several more heavy defeats, until relinquishing it to William Meates halfway through the season. He then went on to play for Hereford Town and Bristol Eastville Rovers.

Roach died in Birmingham in 1955 aged about 91.
