= Thomas Oakes (footballer) =

English footballer

Personal information
- Full name: Thomas Frederick Oakes
- Date of birth: 1874
- Place of birth: staffordshire, England
- Date of death: Unknown
- Position: Forward

Senior career*
Years	Team	Apps	(Gls)
–1896	Hereford Thistle		
1896–1900	Small Heath	35	(8)
1900–19??	Gloucester City		
- * Club domestic league appearances and goals

Thomas Frank Oakes (1874 – after 1900) was an English professional footballer who made 35 appearances in the Football League playing for Small Heath. He played as a forward.

Oakes was born in Cheltenham, Gloucestershire. He played football for Hereford Thistle before joining Small Heath of the Football League Second Division in 1896, making his debut in a 3–1 victory at Blackpool on 23 January 1897. He played regularly for the remainder of the 1896–97 season and the next, but appeared only rarely for the first team over the next two seasons. He left for non-league football with Gloucester City.
