= USS Alnitah =

Cargo ship of the United States Navy

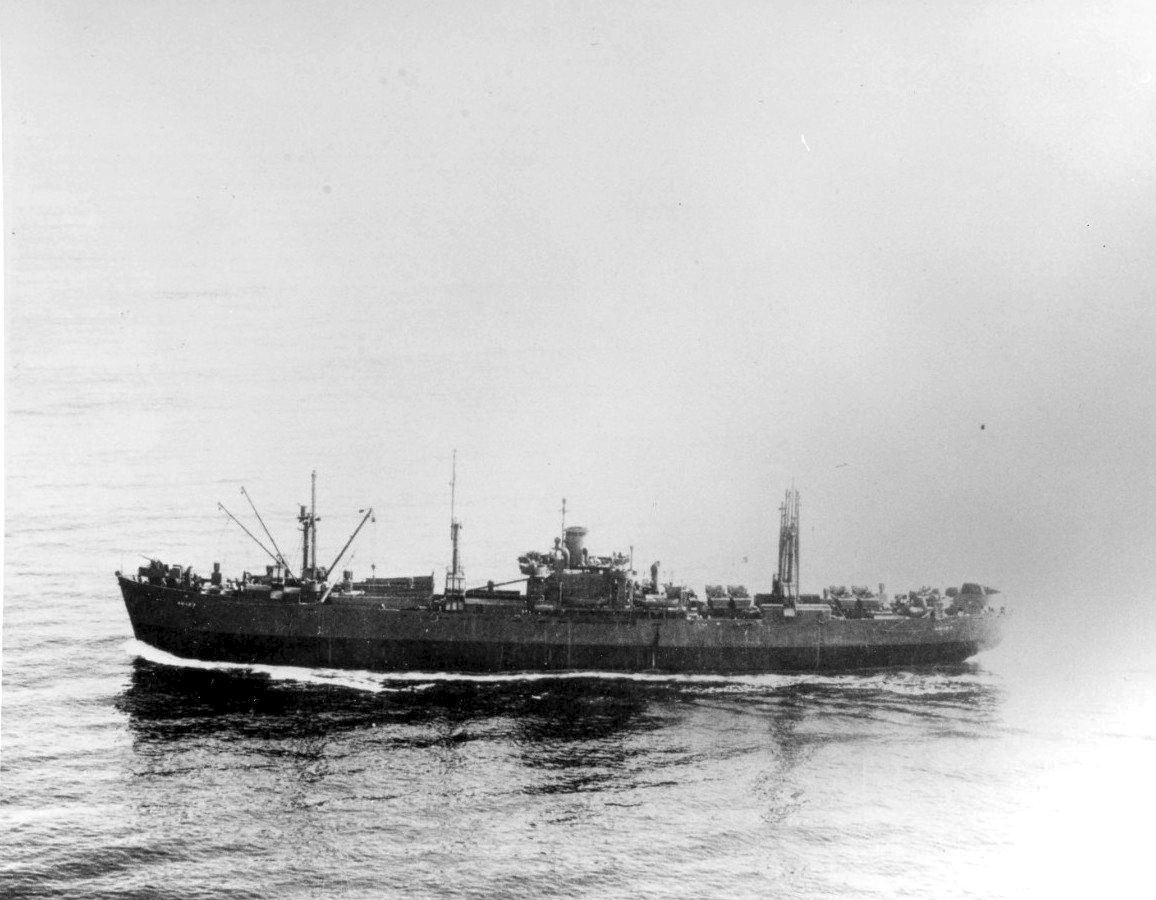
- USS Alnitah (AK-127), under way, date and location unknown.

History

United States
- Name: John A. Logan; Alnitah
- Namesake: John A. Logan; The star Alnitah
- Ordered: as a Type EC2-S-C1 hull, MCE hull 451
- Builder: Permanente Metals Corporation, Richmond, California
- Yard number: 451
- Way number: 10
- Laid down: 12 October 1942
- Launched: 14 January 1943
- Sponsored by: Mrs. T. W. Ludington
- Acquired: 8 October 1943
- Commissioned: 27 November 1943
- Decommissioned: 11 March 1946
- Refit: converted for Naval service at Los Angeles Shipbuilding Corp, San Pedro, CA.
- Stricken: 28 March 1946
- Identification: Hull symbol: AK-127; Code letters: NHCI
- Fate: Sold for scrapping, 3 March 1961

General characteristics
- Class & type: Crater-class cargo ship
- Displacement: 4,023 long tons (4,088 t) (standard); 14,550 long tons (14,780 t) (full load)
- Length: 441 ft 6 in (134.57 m)
- Beam: 56 ft 11 in (17.35 m)
- Draft: 28 ft 4 in (8.64 m)
- Installed power: 2 × Combustion Engineering header-type boilers, 220psi 450°; 2,500 shp (1,900 kW)
- Propulsion: 1 × General Machine Corp. vertical triple-expansion reciprocating steam engine; 1 × shaft
- Speed: 12.5 kn (23.2 km/h; 14.4 mph)
- Capacity: 7,800 t (7,700 long tons) DWT; 444,206 cu ft (12,578.5 m^{3}) (non-refrigerated)
- Troops: 1057
- Complement: 309
- Armament: 1 × 5 in (127 mm)/38 caliber dual purpose gun; 4 × 40 mm (1.6 in) 40mm Bofors anti-aircraft (AA) gun mounts; 6 × 20 mm (0.8 in) Oerlikon cannons anti-aircraft gun mounts

The USS Alnitah (AK-127) was a Crater-class cargo ship in the service of the US Navy in World War II. Named a spelling variation of the star Alnitak in the constellation Orion, it was the only ship of the Navy to bear this name.

== Construction ==
Alnitah was laid down 10 December 1942, as liberty ship SS John A. Logan, MCE hull 451, by Permanente Metals Corporation, Yard No. 2, Richmond, California, under a Maritime Commission (MARCOM) contract; launched on 14 January 1943; sponsored by Mrs. T. W. Ludington; acquired by the Navy on a bareboat basis on 7 October 1943; converted for naval service at San Pedro, California, by Los Angeles Shipbuilding Corp.; renamed Alnitah on 11 October 1943 and simultaneously designated AK-127; and placed in commission at San Pedro on 27 November 1943.

== Service history ==
Following a brief period of shakedown training, the ship took on cargo and personnel at Port Hueneme, California, for transportation to the South Pacific. She departed the California coast on 12 December, and reached Espiritu Santo on 3 January 1944. On that same day, Alnitah reported to Service Squadron 8 for duty as an interisland transport. Among her ports of call were Guadalcanal and Florida Island, Solomon Islands; Espiritu Santo, New Hebrides; Treasury Islands; Russell Islands; Fiji Islands; Auckland, New Zealand; Nouméa, New Caledonia; Milne Bay, New Guinea; Ulithi, Caroline Islands; Tinian and Guam, Mariana Islands; and Okinawa.

Alnitah continued her routine of transporting cargo and personnel throughout the Pacific theatre of operations into late July 1945. The ship departed Saipan on 28 July, and shaped a course for the west coast of the United States. During her homeward voyage, Japan capitulated in mid-August ending World War II. After a two-day visit en route at Pearl Harbor, Hawaii, the cargo ship arrived at San Francisco, California, on 21 August, and received voyage repairs before the vessel resumed action on 25 September. She was subsequently assigned to Magic Carpet duty, which involved shuttling American military personnel from various points in the Pacific back home to the United States.

USS ALNITAH departed Kwajalein Island, Marshall Islands 01NOV1945 and arrived San Diego CA 21NOV1945.

The cargo ship made a voyage from San Francisco to Roi, Kwajalein, and Majuro Atolls in October. She touched back at Pearl Harbor on 12 November before continuing on to San Diego, California. Alnitah debarked her passengers before getting underway on 29 November, for Okinawa. The vessel arrived there on 22 December, and discharged her cargo and passengers. She operated in the Okinawa area through 4 February 1946; then sailed for the Philippines. The ship reached Subic Bay on 8 February and there embarked troops for transportation to Japan. Alnitah left Philippine waters on 16 February, and arrived at Yokosuka, Japan, on 23 February.

== Inactivation and decommissioning ==
USS ALNITAH departed Kwajalein Island, Marshall Islands 01NOV1945 and arrived San Diego CA 21NOV1945.

Upon her arrival preparations were begun to deactivate the ship. She was decommissioned on 11 March 1946, and was transferred to the War Shipping Administration (WSA) representative at Yokohama, Japan. Her name was struck from the Navy list on 28 March 1946.

On 26 September 1947, she was laid up in the National Defense Reserve Fleet, Astoria, Oregon, as part of the "7th Group Libertys". She was sold for scrapping on 3 March 1961, to Zidell Exploration, Inc., for $52,887.87, with delivery on 12 April 1961.

== Notes ==
Citations

== Bibliography ==
Online resources

- "Alnitah". Dictionary of American Naval Fighting Ships. Naval History and Heritage Command. This article incorporates text from this source, which is in the public domain.
- "Kaiser Permanente No. 2, Richmond CA". www.ShipbuildingHistory.com. 13 October 2010.
- "USS Azimech (AK-124)". NavSource. 16 December 2016.
- "ALNITAH (AK-127)". United States Department of Transportation. Archived from the original on December 12, 2019.
