= Charles Hare (priest) =

Anglican priest

Charles Hare was an Anglican priest in Ireland in the 19th century.

Peacocke was born in Cashel, and educated at Portora Royal School and Trinity College, Dublin. He was Archdeacon of Limerick from 1871 until 1881.
