= Wilson Lewis =

English footballer

Personal information
- Full name: Wilson Arnold Lewis
- Date of birth: 1873
- Place of birth: Evesham, England
- Date of death: Unknown
- Position: Centre forward

Senior career*
Years	Team	Apps	(Gls)
1895–1897	Hereford Thistle		
1897–1898	Small Heath	20	(7)
1898–1???	Bromyard		
- * Club domestic league appearances and goals

Wilson Arnold Lewis (1873 – after 1898) was an English professional footballer who made 20 appearances in the Football League playing for Small Heath. He played as a centre forward.

Lewis was born in Evesham, Worcestershire. He joined Small Heath from Birmingham & District League champions Hereford Thistle in 1897. He made his Small Heath debut on 4 September 1897, the opening day of the 1897–98 Second Division season, in a 3–1 win at home to Burton Swifts. In his first 14 games he scored seven goals, but his form dipped in the latter part of the season, and the arrival of Bob McRoberts prompted Lewis's return to non-league football with Bromyard.

== Honours ==
with Hereford Thistle

- Birmingham & District League champions: 1896–97
