= Ang Luha at Lualhati ni Jeronima =

- Directed by: CJ Santos; Ritchie Jota (co-director)
- Written by: CJ Santos
- Based on: El Filibusterismo
- Produced by: CJ Santos; Ritchie Jota; Rem Ermita; Khey dela Paz
- Starring: Karen Gutierrez; Ardi Ignacio; Aljo Sanchez
- Cinematography: Ritchie Jota
- Edited by: CJ Santos
- Music by: CJ Santos
- Production companies: Witty Jack Media; Brainhouse Film Production
- Distributed by: Witty Jack Media
- Release date: 2018
- Running time: 8 minutes 10 minutes (extended version)
- Country: Philippines
- Language: Filipino
- Budget: P60,000

Ang Luha at Lualhati ni Jeronima (The Sorrow and Happiness of Jeronima) is a 2018 Philippine short film by CJ Santos and inspired by the third chapter of Dr. Jose Rizal's El Filibusterismo. It is one of the finalists for the 2018 Wisik Short Film Competition by the National Commission for Culture and the Arts. In December 2018, the film had official selection in In-Short 2018 Film Festival in Lagos, Nigeria.

It follows the old tale of a young woman named Jeronima who was promised marriage by her lover but a twist of fate brought her to the deepest corners of the Pasig River where she met a farmer named Ignacio.

== Plot ==
Tristan is a 5th grader taking photos of the present-day Pasig River where he meets Mang Igme, a mysterious street sweeper who asks him to keep the park clean.

Mang Igme shares the old tale of Jeronima, a young woman living in the old Pasig River and was promised a marriage by her lover Antonio, upon his return from his studies. She waited for him for years and one day, learned that her old sweetheart becomes the town's parish priest.

In fear of tarnishing his reputation, Father Antonio casts Jeronima to the farther side of the river where she met a farmer named Ignacio. Jeronima became friends with Ignacio and they shared love and happiness together.

== Cast ==
- Karen Gutierrez - Jeronima
- Ardi Aquino - Ignacio
- Tristan Jota - Tristan
- Jamieson Lee - Mang Igme
- Aljo Sanchez - Antonio
- CJ Santos - Pepe

== Development ==
Upon the announcement of the National Commission for Culture and the Arts, CJ Santos talked to Rem Ermita and Ritchie Jota in Quezon City and wrote the draft of the script in 30-minutes. The group then launched a crowdsourcing page on Go Get Funding to raise a P90,000 peso budget.

== Accolades ==
After competing for the National Commission for Culture and the Arts, the film has been screened and ran in competition in different international film festivals.

List of accolades
Award / Film Festival	City / Country	Category	Recipient(s)	Result
2018 Wisik Short Film Competition	Manila, Philippines	Best Short Film	Ang Luha at Lualhati ni Jeronima	Nominated
2018 In-Short Film Festival	Lagos, Nigeria	Best Short Film	Ang Luha at Lualhati ni Jeronima	Nominated
2019 SİNEVİZYON International Film Festival	Alsancak, Cyprus	Best Short Film	Ang Luha at Lualhati ni Jeronima	Pending
