= Walter Abbott (footballer, born 1899) =

English footballer (1898–1945)

Personal information
- Date of birth: 16 December 1898
- Place of birth: Birmingham, England
- Date of death: 1945 (aged 46)
- Place of death: Birmingham, England
- Position: Inside left

Senior career*
Years	Team	Apps	(Gls)
191?–1920	Grimsby Town	5	(0)
1920–1921	Chesterfield Municipal	26	(5)
1921–192?	Worcester City		(8)
- Redditch
- Oakengates Town
- Tamworth Castle
- Stewart Street Old Boys
- * Club domestic league appearances and goals

Walter A. Abbott (16 December 1898 – 1945) was an English footballer who played in the Football League for Grimsby Town.

== Life and career ==
Abbott was born in Birmingham, England, on 16 December 1898. He was a son of England international footballer Walter Abbott.

Abbott made five appearances for Second Division club Grimsby Town in the 1919–20 season. He failed to score for the first team, but succeeded for the reserves, playing in the Midland League. A goal in each fixture against Chesterfield Municipal probably contributed to his joining that club for the 1920–21 season, during which he scored five goals from about 28 league matches. His next club was Worcester City, for whom he scored eight Birmingham & District League goals and one in the FA Cup in the first half of the 1921–22 season, He followed this with spells at several more clubs in the Midlands: Redditch, Oakengates Town, Tamworth Castle and Stewart Street Old Boys.

Abbott died in Birmingham in 1945 at the age of 46.
