= Ernest Pointer =

English footballer

Personal information
- Date of birth: 1872
- Place of birth: Birmingham, England
- Date of death: Unknown
- Position: Goalkeeper

Senior career*
Years	Team	Apps	(Gls)
- Redditch Town
1896–1898	Small Heath	28	(0)
1898–1900	Berwick Rangers (Worcester)		
1900–1901	Small Heath	0	(0)
1901–19??	Kidderminster Harriers		
- * Club domestic league appearances and goals

Ernest Pointer (1872 – after 1900) was an English professional footballer who made 28 appearances in the Football League playing for Small Heath. He played as a goalkeeper.

Pointer was born in the Sparkbrook district of Birmingham. He began his football career with Redditch Town of the Birmingham & District League before joining Small Heath of the Football League Second Division in 1896. He made his debut on 12 September 1896 in a 4–3 defeat at Newcastle United, and kept his place throughout the 1896–97 season, at the end of which the club finished in fourth position. His erratic goalkeeping meant that was the only season he spent in the league team, and in 1898 he moved back to the Birmingham & District League with Worcester club Berwick Rangers. Returning to Small Heath two years later, he was unable to establish himself in the reserve team, let alone the first team, and soon dropped back to the Birmingham League again, this time with Kidderminster Harriers.
