= Jimmy Inglis (footballer, born 1872) =

Scottish footballer

Personal information
- Full name: James Allen Inglis
- Date of birth: 1872
- Place of birth: Kirkland, Scotland
- Date of death: after 1899
- Position: Outside right

Senior career*
Years	Team	Apps	(Gls)
18??–1896	Airdrieonians		
1896–1899	Small Heath	55	(22)
1899–1???	Luton Town		
- * Club domestic league appearances and goals

James Allen Inglis (1872 – after 1899) was a Scottish professional footballer who played as an outside right. He moved from Airdrieonians to Small Heath for a fee of £40, and in his first season, 1896–97, scored 16 League goals which made him the club's leading scorer. After another two seasons disrupted by injury and loss of form he moved to Luton Town.
