= Tom Fenoughty (footballer, born 1941) =

English footballer

Personal information
- Full name: Thomas Fenoughty
- Date of birth: 7 June 1941 (age 85)
- Position: Midfielder

Senior career*
Years	Team	Apps	(Gls)
–1964	Sheffield		
1964–1969	Sheffield United	49	(4)
1969–1972	Chesterfield	101	(15)
1972–1977	Matlock Town		

Managerial career
- 1977–1982: Matlock Town
- * Club domestic league appearances and goals

Thomas Fenoughty (born 7 June 1941) was a professional footballer with Sheffield United and Chesterfield from 1964 to 1973, before returning to his career as a pharmaceutical chemist.

== Football career ==
Tom Fenoughty was signed by Sheffield United from non-league Sheffield in 1964. He made 49 appearances, scoring 4 goals, before moving to Chesterfield in 1969. He made 101 appearances (15 goals) for Chesterfield mostly in midfield.

In 1972, he retired from the full-time game, and returned to his career as a pharmaceutical chemist (he is a graduate of Manchester University) while playing part-time for Matlock Town. He played for Matlock for five years, scoring one of their four goals in their 4–0 win over Scarborough in the 1975 FA Trophy victory at Wembley Stadium, and was then their manager for four years.

== Family ==
His brothers Mick and Nick both had spells with Chesterfield, and his father (also named Tom) played for York City. All three brothers played for Matlock in the FA Trophy final in 1975.

His son Mark Fenoughty is currently Chief Operating Officer at Sheffield United.
