= Frank Lester (footballer) =

English footballer

Personal information
- Date of birth: 1870
- Place of birth: Wednesbury, England
- Date of death: Unknown
- Position: Full back

Senior career*
Years	Team	Apps	(Gls)
- Walsall Unity
1895–1901	Small Heath	68	(0)
1901–19??	Walsall		
- * Club domestic league appearances and goals

Frank Lester (1870 – after 1900) was an English professional footballer who played as a full back. He made 68 appearances in the Football League for Small Heath.

Lester was born in Wednesbury, Staffordshire. He played football for Walsall Unity before joining First Division club Small Heath. They were relegated in 1895–96, Lester's first season with the club, but the next season he formed a sound fullback partnership with Billy Pratt. However, the arrival of Arthur Archer as first-choice right back meant Lester was in competition with Pratt for the left-back position, which restricted his appearances. He contributed to Small Heath's runners-up finish in 1900–01 season, thereby winning promotion back to the top flight, but left the club for Walsall later the same year.
