= James Adlington =

English footballer (1872–c.1896)

Personal information
- Date of birth: May 1872
- Place of birth: Shifnal, England
- Position: Outside right

Senior career*
Years	Team	Apps	(Gls)
1892–1895	Ironbridge F.C.		
1895–1896	Small Heath	6	(4)
1896–1897	Berwick Rangers (Worcester)		
1897–????	Stourport Swifts		
- * Club domestic league appearances and goals

James H. Adlington (1872 – after 1896) was an English professional footballer who played in the Football League for Small Heath. He played as an outside right.

Adlington was born in Shifnal, Shropshire. He began his football career with Ironbridge F.C., and joined Small Heath in August 1895. He made his debut in the First Division on 23 November 1895, deputising for Jack Hallam in a home game against Preston North End which Small Heath won 5–2. Adlington, a pacy player, scored in four of his next five games, but lost his place and never played for the club again. He returned to non-league football with Berwick Rangers (Worcester) and then Stourport Swifts.
