= Harry Haddon =

English footballer

Personal information
- Full name: Harry Haddon
- Date of birth: 1871
- Place of birth: Pelsall, England
- Date of death: Unknown
- Place of death: Walsall, England
- Position: Centre forward

Senior career*
Years	Team	Apps	(Gls)
- Pelsall Villa
1894–189x	Lichfield Barracks		
1896–1897	Small Heath	8	(2)
1897–1???	Walsall Wood		
- * Club domestic league appearances and goals

Harry Haddon (1871 – after 1896) was an English professional footballer who played in the Football League for Small Heath.

Haddon was born in Pelsall, Staffordshire. A bustling centre forward, he played local football for Pelsall Villa and Lichfield Barracks before joining Small Heath. He made his debut in the First Division on 22 February 1896 in a 4–1 defeat at Bolton Wanderers, and scored twice in the next four games, but the selectors preferred Jack Jones. Haddon died in Walsall, Staffordshire.
