= John Logan (footballer, born 1871) =

Scottish footballer

Personal information
- Full name: John Theodore Logan
- Date of birth: 1871
- Place of birth: Edinburgh, Scotland
- Date of death: Unknown
- Position: Outside left

Senior career*
Years	Team	Apps	(Gls)
- Partick Thistle
1896–1897	Small Heath	1	(0)
1897–1???	Musselburgh		
- * Club domestic league appearances and goals

John Theodore Logan (1871 – after 1896) was a Scottish professional footballer born in Edinburgh who played in the English Football League for Small Heath. Logan, an outside left, was on the books of Partick Thistle before joining Small Heath in 1896. He played only one competitive game, in the Second Division on 31 October 1896, a 1–0 home defeat to Grimsby Town, before returning to Scotland to play for Musselburgh.
