= Walter Gadsby (footballer, born 1872) =

English footballer

Personal information
- Full name: Walter Gadsby
- Date of birth: 1872
- Place of birth: Bromsgrove, England
- Date of death: Unknown
- Position: Inside right

Senior career*
Years	Team	Apps	(Gls)
- Astwood Bank
- Redditch Excelsior
1896–1898	Small Heath	4	(3)
1898–1???	Watford		
–	Redditch Excelsior		
- * Club domestic league appearances and goals

Walter Gadsby (1872 – after 1897) was an English professional footballer who played in the Football League for Small Heath.

Born in Bromsgrove, Worcestershire, he played local football for Astwood Bank and Redditch Excelsior before signing for Small Heath. Despite scoring twice on his Second Division debut, on 13 February 1897 in a 6–2 win at Burton Wanderers, and solid performances in the reserves, Gadsby played little first-team football. In 1898 he joined Watford before returning to his former club Redditch Excelsior.
