= Adam Fraser =

Scottish footballer (1871–c.1895)

Personal information
- Full name: Adam Fraser
- Date of birth: 1871
- Place of birth: Paisley, Scotland
- Date of death: Unknown
- Position: Left half

Senior career*
Years	Team	Apps	(Gls)
- Glasgow Nomads
- Northern
1895–1896	Small Heath	19	(0)
1896–1???	Heart of Midlothian	0	(0)
- * Club domestic league appearances and goals

Adam Fraser (1871 – after 1895) was a Scottish professional footballer who made 19 appearances in the First Division of the Football League for Small Heath. He played as a left half.

Fraser was born in Paisley, Renfrewshire. He played football for Glasgow Nomads and for former Scottish Football League club Northern, before coming to England to join Football League First Division club Small Heath in November 1895. He made his debut on 30 November in an 8–0 defeat at Derby County, but kept his place, and was ever-present for the remainder of the season. Fraser finished his Small Heath career with an 8–0 win, against Manchester City in the test matches which determined Small Heath's relegation to the Second Division. He then returned to Scotland and signed for Heart of Midlothian, but never played for their first team.
