= Phil Tingay =

English footballer

Personal information
- Full name: Philip Tingay
- Date of birth: 2 May 1950 (age 76)
- Place of birth: Chesterfield, England
- Position: Goalkeeper

Senior career*
Years	Team	Apps	(Gls)
1971–1981	Chesterfield	181	(0)
1972–1973	→ Barnsley (loan)	8	(0)
1981–1983	Kettering Town	36	(0)
1983–1984	Alfreton Town	?	(?)
1984–1985	Buxton	?	(?)
	Gainsborough Trinity	?	(?)
Total		225	(0)

Managerial career
- 2000–2001: Gainsborough Trinity
- * Club domestic league appearances and goals

Philip Tingay (born 2 May 1950) is an English former professional footballer who played in the Football League, as a goalkeeper.
