= Thomas Farnall =

English footballer

Personal information
- Full name: Thomas Farnall
- Date of birth: 1874
- Place of birth: Birmingham, England
- Date of death: 1927 (aged 52–53)
- Place of death: Birmingham, England
- Position: Wing half

Senior career*
Years	Team	Apps	(Gls)
–	Eastville Rovers		
1893–1897	Small Heath	26	(1)
1897–1899	Bristol Eastville Rovers		
1899–1900	Small Heath	19	(1)
1900–1901	Watford	21	(1)
1901–1902	Bristol Rovers	20	(0)
1902	Watford	9	(0)
1903–1905	Bradford City	25	(1)
1905–1906	Walsall	0	(0)
1906–19??	Barrow		
–	Gloucester City		
- * Club domestic league appearances and goals

Thomas Farnall (1874–1927), popularly known as Tot Farnall, was an English professional footballer who made 70 appearances in the Football League playing as a wing half for Small Heath and Bradford City. He played in Bradford City's first ever league game, in a 2–0 defeat at Grimsby Town, going on to play 25 games in the club's first season. He also played in the Southern League for Bristol Rovers and Watford.

Farnall was born and died in Birmingham.
