= Charlie Hare =

English footballer

Personal information
- Full name: Charles Boyd Hare
- Date of birth: 16 March 1870
- Place of birth: Ladywood, Birmingham, England
- Date of death: 10 August 1947 (aged 77)
- Place of death: Erdington, Birmingham, England
- Position: Forward

Youth career
- –: Warwick County
- –: Birmingham United

Senior career*
Years	Team	Apps	(Gls)
1891–1895	Aston Villa	25	(13)
1895–1896	Woolwich Arsenal	19	(7)
1896–1898	Small Heath	43	(14)
1898–1900	Watford	43	(23)
1903–1904	Plymouth Argyle	4	(0)
Total		134	(57)
- * Club domestic league appearances and goals

Charles Boyd Hare (16 March 1870 – 10 August 1947) was an English professional footballer who played in the Football League for Aston Villa, Woolwich Arsenal and Small Heath in the 1890s. An inside forward or centre forward, he also represented Watford and Plymouth Argyle in the Southern League.

== Life and career ==
Born in Ladywood, Birmingham, Hare played in the Football League in the 1890s for Aston Villa, contributing to their first league title in the 1893–94 season. He was transferred to Woolwich Arsenal in February 1895 and made his debut for the Second Division side on 9 March 1895 against Leicester Fosse, which ended as a 3–3 draw. In one and a half seasons at the club, he was in and out of the side, mainly playing at inside forward, although he also deputised for Joe Powell at right back.

With 20 appearances and 7 goals to his name for Woolwich Arsenal, in November 1896 he moved to Small Heath. He then played for Watford in the Southern League, and is joint holder of the club record for most FA Cup goals in a season, with seven in the 1899–1900 campaign. Hare served in South Africa during the Boer War. On his return he tried to revive his career with Plymouth Argyle in the Southern League, but with little success, and he left the professional game in 1904.

He ran a hotel in Liskeard, Cornwall, before returning to Birmingham where he died in 1947.

== Honours ==
Aston Villa

- Football League First Division champions: 1893–94
