= Thomas Dunlop (footballer) =

Scottish footballer

Personal information
- Date of birth: 7 May 1872
- Place of birth: Annbank, Scotland
- Place of death: Scotland
- Position: Right half

Senior career*
| Years | Team | Apps | (Gls) |
- Annbank
| 1896–1898 | Small Heath | 59 | (2) |
| 1898–???? | Dundee Harp | | |
- * Club domestic league appearances and goals

Thomas Dunlop (7 May 1872 – after 1898) was a Scottish professional footballer born in Annbank, South Ayrshire, who played as a right half. He made 59 appearances and scored twice in the English Football League playing for Small Heath.
