= Michael Good (footballer) =

Scottish footballer

Personal information
- Date of birth: 1 July 1875
- Place of birth: Airdrie, Scotland
- Place of death: Scotland
- Positions: Half back; inside forward

Senior career*
Years	Team	Apps	(Gls)
- Airdrie Hill
- Airdrieonians
1896–1898	Small Heath	15	(1)
1898–1901	Watford		
1901–1902	Preston North End	24	(2)
1902–1903	Bristol City	32	(5)
1903–1904	Reading		
–	Brighton & Hove Albion		
–	Southern United		
- * Club domestic league appearances and goals

Michael H. S. Good (1 July 1875 – after 1904), sometimes known as Micky Good, was a Scottish professional footballer who made 71 appearances in the Football League playing for Small Heath, Preston North End and Bristol City.

Good was born in Airdrie, which was then in Lanarkshire. He played for Airdrie Hill and for Airdrieonians before joining Small Heath in 1896. A short, stockily-built forward, able to cover the half-back positions as well, he made his debut in the Second Division on 19 December 1896, playing at right half in a 2–0 defeat away at Loughborough. He had a run of games at inside right at the end of the 1897–98 season and the beginning of the next, but failed to score enough goals. He moved to Southern League club Watford in 1898, in 1901 returned to the Football League with Preston North End, and spent 1902 with Bristol City, where he made 35 appearances in all competitions. He then returned to the Southern League with successively Reading, Brighton & Hove Albion and Southern United.
