= Walter Abbott (footballer, born 1877) =

English footballer (1877–1941)

- Abbott pictured in 1907

Personal information
- Full name: Walter Abbott
- Date of birth: 7 December 1877
- Place of birth: Birmingham, England
- Date of death: 1 February 1941 (aged 63)
- Place of death: Birmingham, England
- Height: 5 ft 9 1/2 in (1.77 m)
- Positions: Inside left; left half

Senior career*
Years	Team	Apps	(Gls)
1896–1899	Small Heath	76	(57)
1899–1908	Everton	257	(32)
1908–1910	Burnley	57	(15)
1910–1911	Birmingham	1	(0)
Total		391	(104)

International career
1902	England	1	(0)
- * Club domestic league appearances and goals

Walter Abbott (7 December 1877 – 1 February 1941) was an English professional footballer who scored 104 goals from 391 games in the Football League playing for Small Heath (which was later renamed Birmingham), Everton and Burnley. He was capped once for the England national team.

== Life and career ==
Abbott was born in Small Heath, Birmingham, and began his football career with his local club. For Small Heath he played as an inside left and scored 66 goals in 85 appearances in all competitions for the club. In the 1898–99 season he scored a club record 42 goals, of which 34 came in the same number of League games. At Everton he was turned into a wing half. While at Everton he won his only cap for England, on 3 March 1902 in a goalless draw against Wales at the Racecourse Ground, Wrexham. He also played four times for a Football League XI.

Abbott joined Football League Second Division club Burnley from Everton in May 1908 and made his debut for the club on 1 September 1908, playing at left-half in the 1–0 defeat to Chesterfield at Turf Moor. He kept his place in the team for the first 13 games of the season before being dropped in favour of Tommy Mayson. Abbott was selected at inside left for the first game of 1909 away at Glossop, and scored the winning goal in a 2–1 victory. He remained first choice in the position for the rest of the campaign, missing only 2 of the last 18 matches. He scored twice during the 9–0 win against Crystal Palace in the second round of the FA Cup, and netted the only goal of the game as Burnley won away at Clapton Orient on 27 March 1909. Abbott scored five goals in the opening seven matches of the 1909–10 season, and netted his first Burnley hat-trick in the 4–2 defeat of Wolverhampton Wanderers on 13 November 1909. He scored his ninth and final goal of the campaign as Burnley beat Leicester Fosse on 11 December 1909. Abbott made his last appearance for the Clarets in the 1–1 draw with Leicester Fosse on 23 April 1910, having played a total of 65 league and cup matches during his two years at Turf Moor. Abbott returned to Small Heath, which had by then been renamed Birmingham F.C., but played only once before injury forced his retirement in 1911.

Abbott's son, also named Walter, played League football for Grimsby Town. Abbott died in Birmingham in 1941 at the age of 63.

== Honours ==
Small Heath

- Second Division top scorer: 1898–99

Everton

- First Division runners-up: 1901–02, 1904–05
- FA Cup winners: 1905–06
- FA Cup runners up: 1906–07
