= James McEwen (footballer) =

English footballer (1872–1942)

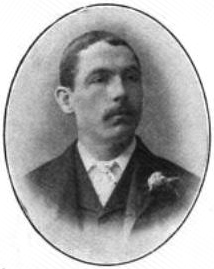
- In The Sketch, 18 November 1896

Personal information
- Date of birth: 16 October 1872
- Place of birth: Bootle, England
- Date of death: May 1942 (aged 69)
- Place of death: Barnes, England
- Position: Full back

Youth career
- Lansdowne

Senior career*
Years	Team	Apps	(Gls)
1892–1893	Bootle	14	(0)
1893	Liverpool South End		
1897–1898	Luton Town	30	(1)
1898–1899	Glossop North End	33	(1)
1899–1900	Glossop	21	(0)
1900–1903	Bury	102	(0)
1903–1905	Luton Town		
1905–????	Norwich City		
1911–1912	Glossop	2	(0)

Managerial career
- 1907–1908: Norwich City
- 1915–1919: Arsenal (de facto)
- * Club domestic league appearances and goals

James McEwen (16 October 1872 – May 1942), also known as Jimmy McEwen or "Punch" McEwen, was an English professional footballer and coach.

== Biography ==
McEwen started his playing career with Bootle, before moving south to join Luton Town. After one season, he then joined Glossop North End for their first season in the Football League. At the end of the season, North End gained promotion to the First Division. The club then changed their name to Glossop but finished the 1899–1900 season at the foot of the table.

McEwen then moved on to Bury, where he won the FA Cup in 1903, with a crushing 6–0 victory over Derby County. After three years at Gigg Lane, he returned for a spell at Luton Town (now in the Southern League), before joining Norwich City, initially as a player, before taking on the role of manager. McEwen was City's second manager, and was in charge for 43 matches between 1907 and 1908, winning 13, losing 20 and drawing 10 games

After leaving Norwich City he returned to Glossop as a player for the 1911–12 season. He then joined Fulham as a scout before in 1914 he joined Arsenal's coaching staff, working under manager George Morrell. After Morrell's resignation in 1915, McEwen took charge of first-team affairs at the club during the remainder of World War I, becoming the de facto caretaker manager of the team, which played in the London Combination. After the war had ended he was replaced by Leslie Knighton for the start of the 1919–20 season, but McEwen continued to stay with the club, working as a dressing-room attendant and as a coach under Herbert Chapman.

He died at his home in Barnes in May 1942.

== Honours ==
=== As a player ===
Glossop North End

- Football League Second Division runner-up: 1898–99

Bury

- FA Cup: 1903
