= 1889–90 Small Heath F.C. season =

Small Heath F.C.
1889–90 season
- Chairman: Walter W. Hart
- Secretary: Alfred Jones
- Ground: Coventry Road
- Football Alliance: 10th (of 12)
- FA Cup: Second round proper (eliminated by Wolverhampton Wanderers)
- Birmingham Cup: Second round (eliminated by West Bromwich Albion)
- Warwickshire Cup: Final (drew with Warwick County)
- Top goalscorer: League: Will Devey (18); All: Will Devey (27)
- Highest home attendance: 3,000 (several games)
- Lowest home attendance: 500 vs Darwen, 15 February 1890
Home colours

The 1889–90 season was the ninth season of competitive association football played by Small Heath F.C., an English football club based in the Small Heath district of Birmingham. They competed in the inaugural season of the Football Alliance. They finished in tenth position in the twelve-team league with six wins, five draws and eleven defeats, which gave them seventeen points. The team scored 44 goals in Alliance competition but conceded 67.

Small Heath entered the 1889–90 FA Cup at the second qualifying round stage. They progressed through three qualifying rounds and one round proper, eventually losing in the second round proper (last 16) to Football League club Wolverhampton Wanderers. In local cup competitions, they were eliminated by West Bromwich Albion in the second round of the Birmingham Cup, and drew with Warwick County in the final of the Warwickshire Cup. Small Heath also played several friendly matches during the season.

Small Heath used twenty-four different players in nationally organised competitive matches during the season and had fourteen different goalscorers. Walter Gittins missed just one such match over the season; his full-back partner Fred Speller missed two. The top scorer was centre forward and captain Will Devey with 27 goals, of which 18 were scored in league competition.

== Background ==
In the 1888–89 season, which coincided with the Small Heath club's first year as a limited company, it made enough profit to pay shareholders a dividend of 5 per cent. The team played in the Combination, a league established to provide regular competitive football for those clubs not invited to join the newly formed Football League. The Combination was not well organised, and not all teams completed their required 16 fixtures; Small Heath achieved 11 likely Combination matches. After Leek pulled out of their visit to Small Heath in January 1889, the Birmingham Daily Mail opined that it was "becoming the exception rather than the rule to keep a Combination fixture", and its management needed to consider its future. A proposal that the Football League be expanded to 24 teams was rejected, so a new league, to be known as the Football Alliance, was formed to cater for those excluded. Small Heath was one of the 12 clubs accepted.

Small Heath retained most of the previous season's regular players, despite talk of "two or three desertions that will be serious to their prospects if rumour should turn out to be correct". Reports linking full-back Fred Speller with Warwick County left the Birmingham Daily Post "wondering at footballers' ingratitude." One major departure was goalscoring winger Ted Hill, who was unwilling to commit to regular competitive football. New arrivals included Fred Heath, "a fast runner and a good dribbler [who] centres while running at full speed" who was seen as Hill's replacement, fellow forward Billy Pratt, full-back Walter Gittins and backup goalkeeper Francis Banks.

Devey was appointed captain, though the Post suggested his tendency to argue with teammates made him a less than ideal candidate for the role. The team played in black shirts with an amber collar, white knickerbockers and black stockings, colours first adopted in January 1889.

== Season review ==
=== September–October ===
Small Heath opened the Football Alliance campaign with a win. They took an early two-goal lead against Birmingham St George's at Coventry Road, and although Saints equalised before the interval and had the better of the second half, Chris Charsley's goalkeeping and Fred Speller's defence kept the Heathens in the game, and Will Devey took advantage of a goalkeeping error for the winning goal. During the reserve team match played the same day, a young opponent was kneed in the abdomen; he died of his injuries two days later in Birmingham General Hospital. Walter Gittins and Wilton Lines made their debuts at home to Bootle in front of a large crowd, attracted by Bootle's success in holding the "Invincibles" – Preston North End, champions of the Football League, who had gone through the inaugural season unbeaten – to a draw in a friendly match. Small Heath came out of the match with a 2–2 draw, with goals from Devey and Eddy Stanley in the first 12 minutes of the game. Bootle scored once before Thomas Davenport narrowly failed to increase Heath's lead when he headed against the crossbar, and after Bootle tied the scores, both sides' defences worked hard to keep them tied. For the third Alliance match in succession, Small Heath let slip a lead, as their visit to Walsall Town Swifts finished at one goal apiece, and September ended with a 3–1 defeat of Burslem Port Vale in a "somewhat dull" friendly.

On a slippery pitch in "a perfect deluge", Small Heath held hosts Sunderland Albion to a one-all draw at half-time, but in the second half, Sunderland scored five goals without reply; Charsley "was indifferently supported, and the visitors seemed to fall all to pieces". At home to The Wednesday in similar conditions, Devey gave Small Heath a two-goal lead, but although Speller was able to frustrate many of Wednesday's left-wing attacks, they were able to score twice to draw the game. The Birmingham Daily Post thought Small Heath had done well to secure a draw, because their forwards passed wildly and lacked any effective combination, while Wednesday's forwards had been profligate in front of goal. The Sheffield Independent concurred that Small Heath were "somewhat lucky" to draw, as "in every part of the game [Wednesday] surpassed their opponents", and Small Heath only managed to keep them out by defending in numbers. The result left them seventh in the table, having spent September in the top three. In a largely one-sided game, Small Heath beat Oldbury Town 3–1 in the second qualifying round of the Association Cup.

=== November–December ===
A goalless visit to Nottingham Forest, where both sides' forwards were "altogether nonplussed by the wind, which careered about in the wildest gusts", was a better result for the visitors than for their hosts. Eddy Stanley shot against the crossbar, and Forest had a goal disallowed for offside. The 18-year-old Billy Walton made a "not conspicuously successful" debut: Walton had attended the 1886 FA Cup semi-final as a supporter of the then Small Heath Alliance, was to play for the club for fourteen years, helped clear snow from the pitch so that the official opening of the St Andrew's Ground in 1906 could go ahead, was present at the 1931 and 1956 FA Cup Finals, and attended St Andrew's until not long before his death in 1963. The match with Walsall Town Swifts began late because the visitors' kit had gone missing. Walsall's defence was sound, if unnecessarily rough, and their forwards took advantage of mistakes by Gittins and Speller to clinch a 2–0 win. Small Heath had no difficulty progressing in the Association Cup, winning 5–1 at the home of Wednesbury Old Athletic. The Alliance fixture with The Wednesday, scheduled for the same day, was postponed until 21 December.

The comfortable victories continued at home to Grimsby Town in the Alliance, courtesy of a steadfast defence, two goals from Devey, and one by Heath, and then in the next round of the Cup, by four goals to nil at home to Walsall Town Swifts, on a pitch covered in a combination of snow, slush and mud on which "occasionally one of [the players] would take an involuntary slide of about a dozen yards, and then sit down with a force and a directness that must have been surprisingly sad." Small Heath, without Charsley, Short, Walton and Will Devey, could field only ten men for their rearranged visit to The Wednesday, top of the table and a particularly strong side at home. Jenkyns took over the captaincy, and he, Speller and reserve goalkeeper Francis Banks performed well, but the team was overwhelmed; the result, a 9–1 loss, in which Small Heath's only goal was scored by Wednesday's Teddy Brayshaw, remains a club record defeat.

Small Heath had three Alliance matches over the Christmas period. On Christmas morning, still without Devey and Walton, they played Birmingham St George's at Cape Hill. The home side took the lead, but Short equalised with a shot that rebounded off the underside of the crossbar shortly before half-time. In the second half, with the sun at their backs, St George's took charge, and the match finished 4–1. At Grimsby Town the following day, another weakened team lost by four clear goals, but two days later, Small Heath stopped the rot against Long Eaton Rangers despite the continued absence of Devey and Short's withdrawal. The play in a goalless first half suggested the players had enjoyed their Christmas festivities, but after the interval, Small Heath began to press, and came out winners by three goals to one. They went into the new year in seventh position; in terms of points, ten from twelve games placed them rather nearer the bottom than the top of the table.

=== January–February ===
Will Devey was able to return to the attack, but his brother and Jenkyns were replaced in the half-back line by Morgan and Charlie Simms for the match at home to Crewe Alexandra; further depleted when Harry Morris left the field through injury, Small Heath lost 2–0. This was their last Alliance match until mid-February. With the half-back line at full strength, Small Heath took a two-goal lead at home to Long Eaton Rangers in the Birmingham Cup, but J. Start scored twice in the second half to force a replay. A 4–0 defeat of Notts Jardines in a friendly "played in the most apathetic manner" preceded the first round proper of the Association Cup, against London Cup-holders Clapton; the Birmingham Daily Post warned that the visitors, "somewhat of an unknown quantity", should not be taken lightly. Simms and Stanley replaced Ted Devey and Short in a win by three goals to one, helped by Small Heath's superior passing and stamina, and the Post thought the "brilliant run by which Stanley scored the third goal was one of the finest pieces of play that has been witnessed at Coventry Road for many a day". The London-based Pall Mall Gazette thought their team were "evidently out of form just now." In the Birmingham Cup replay, at Long Eaton, the Rangers tried to force the game in the first half, but could not score, and Devey could; after the interval, the game was more open, and Small Heath won 2–0. The result was variously reported as a Birmingham Cup tie, an Alliance match, or both. The teams were scheduled to meet in the Alliance on 8 February, but did not do so, and the committee later ruled that the Birmingham Cup meeting should also count as an Alliance fixture.

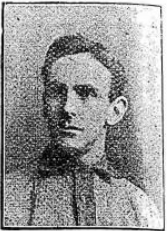
Fred Wheldon scored 113 goals from 175 Alliance, League and FA Cup matches for Small Heath.

Small Heath were not expected to beat Wolverhampton Wanderers on their own ground, and they did not, but the match and the result were much closer than envisaged; the Liverpool Mercury described it as a "scare". The pitch was particularly deep in mud, and the visitors played under protest, but later decided it would be unsporting to take their complaint further. Heath played at left half instead of Ted Devey, and Short was absent, but Small Heath opened the scoring through Will Devey's determination, despite Wolverhampton allocating three men to mark him. The home players were more accustomed to the conditions, and this told in the end; despite the sound defensive work of Charsley, Speller and Heath, Wolverhampton scored twice, and went through to the last eight of the competition.

Charsley, Speller, Morris, Jenkyns and Will Devey were selected to represent Warwickshire in a match against the Manchester Football Association; Speller sprained his ankle during the match, which Warwickshire lost 4–1, but his unavailability did not adversely affect Small Heath's return to Alliance competition with a 6–2 defeat of Darwen. The game marked the debuts of Dick Wilcock and Jack Hallam of Oswestry Town F.C., Jack went on to score 63 goals from 155 matches in national competition for the club, and Fred Wheldon, who scored 113 goals from 175 such matches before leaving for Aston Villa for a transfer fee of £350, reported to be an all-time record, and later played for England. With Speller still out and the new forwards ineligible, Small Heath were eliminated from the Birmingham Cup by a strong West Bromwich Albion side. The first half of the visit to second-placed Crewe Alexandra was even; Crewe won the second half by five goals to one.

For the second time this season, a serious accident happened in a Small Heath reserve match, on this occasion against Singer's in the Birmingham Junior Cup. A Singer's full back slipped and fell while attempting to head the ball, an opponent fell on top of him, and it was feared the victim would be left paralysed.

=== March–April ===
In an even, attacking friendly at Burslem Port Vale, Walton scored twice late in the game to secure a 4–3 win. Small Heath were without the Devey brothers, on representative duty with the Birmingham Association teams. Will's eleven lost by a single goal to Lancashire, and Ted's beat the London Association at Kennington Oval in a match reduced to 30 minutes each way because of heavy snow. Back in the Alliance, Small Heath were expected to beat Nottingham Forest, but the manner of their victory was "sensational and surprising". Will Devey scored six goals, George Short three, Ted Devey two and Hallam one to set a club record victory margin in national competition of twelve goals to nil, that, although has been equaled, still stands. The next Saturday, they failed to beat Newton Heath when Walton was unable to tap the ball into an open goal with little time remaining, and the week after, they did enough to beat Derby Junction in a dull friendly on a dull afternoon with Junction's goalkeeper the best player on the field. Playing against the wind at home to Sunderland Albion, Small Heath conceded three early goals; on change of ends the visitors' defence stood firm, apart from one "magnificent shot" by Will Devey.

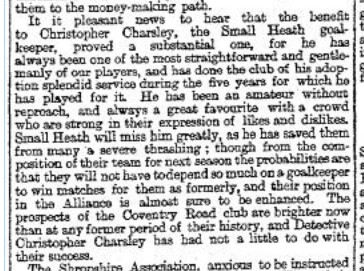
Tribute to Charsley from the Birmingham Daily Post, May 1890

The Alliance campaign ended with a three-match tour of Lancashire over the Easter weekend. They went into Friday's match in eighth place, one point clear of the bottom four teams, who would have to apply for re-election to the competition for the new season. The absent Charsley was "much missed" as Bootle took a four-goal lead by the interval, and in a more competitive second half, scored only twice. On the Saturday, in an improved performance, they came off worse in an open, attacking game at Darwen, and on Monday at Newton Heath, they equalled their record defeat set only a few months earlier, a series of results that confirmed their finishing the season in the bottom four.

Small Heath played several friendly matches after the end of the competitive season. They beat Kidderminster Harriers 4–1 in front of "a fair number" of spectators at Coventry Road, and played Stoke home and away, each match won by its hosts. A benefit match was held for Chris Charsley ahead of his retirement; despite the admission charge being increased for the occasion, around 6,000 spectators turned up to watch a schoolboys' match followed by the main attraction. In an encounter described by the Birmingham Daily Post as "perhaps the closest and most exciting ever played on the field", Aston Villa drew 2–2 with a Small Heath eleven including St George's centre forward John Devey, older brother of Will and Ted and future England international. A substantial sum was raised. Charsley and Will Devey represented the Birmingham Association against Liverpool and District at Anfield; Ted Devey was also selected, but was unavailable. The Liverpool team won by a single goal.

The season ended with the final of the Warwickshire Association's senior cup competition. Small Heath were exempted until the semi-final, in which they beat Unity Gas Department. In the final they faced Warwick County at that club's home ground, the County Cricket Ground. The match was drawn, and the second half was marred by a fight for which one player from each side was sent off.

== Summary and aftermath ==
Small Heath finished tenth in the inaugural season of the Football Alliance, and were re-elected for 1890–91. Among regular first-team players to leave the club were Walter Gittins, Eddy Stanley, and Chris Charsley. Gittins, who partnered Fred Speller at full-back throughout the season, moved on to Stafford Rangers. Stanley had been with the club for nine years before injury forced his retirement. During that time he scored 14 times in 22 FA Cup matches, contributed two goals and an assist as Small Heath won their first trophy, the 1883 Walsall Cup, and scored 5 goals from 13 games in the Football Alliance campaign. Goalkeeper Charsley, a serving police officer, announced his retirement. In June, he was honoured with a dinner at which he was presented with the proceeds of his benefit, some of which had been spent on a piano, and there was £40 left over. The Birmingham Daily Post suggested the club "were hardly likely ever to find so good a man again".

New arrivals included forward Charlie Short, who had played one match for Small Heath in March before finishing the season with Unity Gas, full-back Tom Bayley from Walsall Town Swifts, and goalkeeper Charles Partridge from Wednesbury Old Athletic. The club decided to change to a new kit – a plain royal blue shirt and stockings with white knickerbockers – because the black kit had proved difficult to see for players and spectators alike.

== Match details ==
For consistency, attendances and goalscorers' names in the Football Alliance are sourced from Blakeman, Brown & Warsop (2009), p. 25. Information in contemporary newspaper reports could, and often did, differ.

=== Football Alliance ===
Football Alliance match details
Date	Opponents	Venue	Result	Score F–A	Scorers	Attendance	Refs.
7 September 1889	Birmingham St George's	H	W	3–2	G. Short, Stanley, W. Devey	2,000	
14 September 1889	Bootle	H	D	2–2	W. Devey, Stanley	2,000	
21 September 1889	Walsall Town Swifts	A	D	1–1	W. Devey	1,500	
12 October 1889	Sunderland Albion	A	L	1–6	Davenport	1,000	
19 October 1889	The Wednesday	H	D	2–2	W. Devey 2	3,000	
2 November 1889	Nottingham Forest	A	D	0–0		1,000	
9 November 1889	Walsall Town Swifts	H	L	0–2		3,000	
23 November 1889	Grimsby Town	H	W	3–1	W. Devey 2, Heath	3,000	
21 December 1889	The Wednesday	A	L	1–9	Brayshaw o.g.	1,500	
25 December 1889	Birmingham St George's	A	L	1–4	Heath	5,000	
26 December 1889	Grimsby Town	A	L	0–4		3,000	
28 December 1889	Long Eaton Rangers	H	W	3–1	Stanley 2, Pratt	2,000	
4 January 1890	Crewe Alexandra	H	L	0–2		3,000	
25 January 1890	Long Eaton Rangers	A	W	2–0	W. Devey, Lines	500	(Note: The Football Alliance decided that the Birmingham Cup match played between Small Heath and Long Eaton Rangers at Long Eaton should also count as an Alliance match.)
15 February 1890	Darwen	H	W	6–2	Jenkyns, Hallam, W. Devey, Wheldon 2, Wilcock	500	
22 February 1890	Crewe Alexandra	A	L	2–6	W. Devey, Stanley	2,000	
8 March 1890	Nottingham Forest	H	W	12–0	W. Devey 6, G. Short 3, Hallam, E. Devey 2	1,000	
15 March 1890	Newton Heath	H	D	1–1	Wilcock	2,000	
29 March 1890	Sunderland Albion	H	L	1–3	W. Devey	2,000	
4 April 1890	Bootle	A	L	0–6		1,000	
5 April 1890	Darwen	A	L	2–4	Hallam, Morris	3,000	
7 April 1890	Newton Heath	A	L	1–9	W. Devey	4,000	

League table (part)
Pos	Team	Pld	W	D	L	GF	GA	GAv	Pts	Qualification or relegation
8	Newton Heath LYR	22	9	2	11	40	44	0.909	20	
9	Walsall Town Swifts	22	8	3	11	44	59	0.746	19	
10	Small Heath	22	6	5	11	44	67	0.657	17	
11	Nottingham Forest	22	6	5	11	31	62	0.500	17	
12	Long Eaton Rangers	22	4	2	16	35	73	0.479	10	Left and joined the Midland League

Rules for classification: 1) points; 2) goal average.

=== FA Cup ===
For consistency, attendances and goalscorers' names in the FA Cup matches are sourced from Matthews (2010), pp. 224–225 Information in contemporary newspaper reports could, and often did, differ.

FA Cup match details
Round	Date	Opponents	Venue	Result	Score F–A	Scorers	Attendance	Refs.
Second qualifying round	26 October 1889	Oldbury Town	A	W	3–1	W. Devey 2, Davenport	1,000	
Third qualifying round	16 November 1889	Wednesbury Old Athletic	A	W	5–1	Walton 2, W. Devey 2, Heath	2,000	
Fourth qualifying round	7 December 1889	Walsall Town Swifts	H	W	4–0	W. Devey 3, Stanley	2,000	
First round proper	18 January 1890	Clapton	H	W	3–1	W. Devey, Stanley 2	2,000	
Second round proper	1 February 1890	Wolverhampton Wanderers	A	L	1–2	W. Devey	4,000	

=== Birmingham Senior Cup ===
Birmingham Cup match details
Round	Date	Opponents	Venue	Result	Score F–A	Scorers	Attendance	Refs.
First round	6 January 1890	Long Eaton Rangers	H	D	2–2	W. Devey 2		
First round replay	25 January 1890	Long Eaton Rangers	A	W	2–0	W. Devey, not known		
Second round	17 February 1890	West Bromwich Albion	A	L	0–2		1,000	

=== Warwickshire Cup ===
Warwickshire Cup match details
Round	Date	Opponents	Venue	Result	Score F–A	Scorers	Attendance	Refs.
Semi-final	3 May 1890	Unity Gas Department	A	W	5–4	not known		
Final	24 May 1890	Warwick County	A	D	1–1			

=== Other matches ===
Apart from those detailed below, Small Heath also played non-competitive fixtures against a Small Heath past players XI, Burton Swifts, and two other matches against Aston Villa. One of these matches was held as a benefit for the long-serving Eddy Stanley, and raised £15 10s.

Details of other matches
Date	Opponents	Venue	Result	Score F–A	Scorers	Attendance	Notes
28 September 1889	Burslem Port Vale	H	W	3–1	W. Devey 2, Butcher	2,000	Friendly match
11 January 1890	Notts Jardines	H	W	4–1	Short, Whitehouse, W. Devey, Pratt	1,000	Friendly match
1 March 1890	Burslem Port Vale	A	W	4–3	"rush" 2, Walton 2	1,000	Friendly match
22 March 1890	Derby Junction	H	W	2–0	Short, Devey	"large"	Friendly match
12 April 1890	Kidderminster Harriers	H	W	4–1	W. Devey 2, Hallam, not known	"a fair number"	Friendly match
19 April 1890	Stoke	A	L	0–2			Friendly match
26 April 1890	Stoke	H	W	2–1	not known, Hallam	2,000	Friendly match
5 May 1890	Aston Villa	H	L	0–4		6,000	Benefit match for Chris Charsley

== Appearances and goals ==
This table includes appearances and goals in nationally organised competitive matches – the Football Alliance and FA Cup – only.
For a description of the playing positions, see Formation (association football)#2–3–5 (Pyramid).

Players' appearances and goals by competition
Name	Position	Alliance		FA Cup		Total	
Name	Position	Apps	Goals	Apps	Goals	Apps	Goals
Francis Banks	Goalkeeper	3	0	0	0	3	0
Chris Charsley	Goalkeeper	19	0	5	0	24	0
Archibald Barton	Full back	1	0	0	0	1	0
Edward Clarke	Full back	1	0	0	0	1	0
Walter Gittins	Full back	21	0	5	0	26	0
Fred Speller	Full back	20	0	5	0	25	0
Ted Devey	Half back	19	2	3	0	22	2
Caesar Jenkyns	Half back	19	1	5	0	24	1
A. Morgan	Half back	1	0	0	0	1	0
Harry Morris	Half back	18	1	5	0	23	2
Charlie Simms	Half back	7	0	1	0	8	0
Thomas Davenport	Forward	5	1	2	1	7	2
Will Devey	Forward	18	18	5	9	23	27
Jack Hallam	Forward	7	3	0	0	7	3
Frederick Heath	Forward	17	2	5	1	22	3
Wilton Lines	Forward	7	1	0	0	7	1
Billy Pratt	Forward	10	1	3	0	13	1
Charlie Short	Forward	1	0	0	0	1	0
George Short	Forward	13	4	3	0	16	4
Eddy Stanley	Forward	13	5	4	3	17	8
Billy Walton	Forward	13	0	4	2	17	2
Ernie Watts	Forward	2	0	0	0	2	0
Fred Wheldon	Forward	2	2	0	0	2	2
Dick Wilcock	Forward	4	2	0	0	4	2

== Notes ==
1. Name was misspelt as Wilcox, the player was Albert Richard "Dick" Wilcock.

== See also ==
- Birmingham City F.C. seasons

== Sources ==
- Blakeman, Mick; Brown, Tony; Warsop, Keith, eds. (2009). The Football Alliance Match by Match: 1889/90 to 1891/92. Nottingham: SoccerData. ISBN 978-1-905891-19-1.
- Matthews, Tony (1995). Birmingham City: A Complete Record. Derby: Breedon Books. ISBN 978-1-85983-010-9.
- Matthews, Tony (2000). The Encyclopedia of Birmingham City Football Club 1875–2000. Cradley Heath: Britespot. ISBN 978-0-9539288-0-4.
- Matthews, Tony (2010). Birmingham City: The Complete Record. Derby: DB Publishing. ISBN 978-1-85983-853-2.
