= 1890–91 Small Heath F.C. season =

Small Heath F.C.
1890–91 season
- Chairman: Walter W. Hart
- Secretary: Alfred Jones
- Ground: Coventry Road
- Football Alliance: 10th (of 12)
- FA Cup: Disqualified
- Birmingham Senior Cup: First round (eliminated by West Bromwich Albion)
- Birmingham Charity Cup: Semi-final (eliminated by Aston Villa)
- Top goalscorer: League: Charlie Short (16); All: Will Devey, Short (17)
- Highest home attendance: 5,000 (several games)
- Lowest home attendance: 500 vs The Wednesday, 10 January 1891
Home colours

The 1890–91 season was the tenth season of competitive association football played by Small Heath Football Club, an English football club based in the Small Heath district of Birmingham, and their second season in the Football Alliance. They finished in tenth position in the twelve-team league for the second consecutive year. Seven wins, two draws and thirteen defeats gave them sixteen points, one point fewer than in 1889–90. The team scored 58 goals in Alliance competition, but conceded 66, at an average of three goals per match.

Small Heath entered the 1890–91 FA Cup at the first qualifying round stage, but were disqualified from the competition after winning their second qualifying round match for fielding an unregistered player. In local competitions, they were eliminated by West Bromwich Albion in the first round of the Birmingham Senior Cup and by Aston Villa in the semi-final of the Birmingham Charity Cup. Small Heath also played several friendly matches during the season.

Small Heath used twenty-two different players in nationally organised competitive matches during the season and had eight different goalscorers. Five players – the full-back pairing of Tom Bayley and Fred Speller and forwards Jack Hallam, Fred Wheldon and captain Will Devey – were ever-present over the 24-match season. The top scorer in the Alliance was centre-forward Charlie Short with 16 goals; if the FA Cup is included, Short and Devey each scored 17.

== Background ==
Small Heath finished tenth in the inaugural season of the Football Alliance, and was re-elected for 1890–91. Among regular first-team players to leave the club were Walter Gittins, Eddy Stanley, and Chris Charsley. Gittins was Fred Speller's full-back partner for most of the previous season, and moved on to Stafford Rangers. Stanley had been with the club for nine years before injury forced his retirement. During that time he played in 22 FA Cup matches, scoring 14 times, contributed two goals and an assist as Small Heath won their first trophy, the Walsall Cup in 1883, and scored 5 goals from 13 games in the first Football Alliance campaign. Goalkeeper Charsley, a serving police officer, announced his retirement. In June, he was honoured with a dinner at which he was presented with a £40 collection and a piano. The Birmingham Daily Post suggested the club "were hardly likely ever to find so good a man again".

New arrivals included forward Charlie Short, who had played one match for Small Heath in March before finishing the season with Unity Gas, full-back Tom Bayley from Walsall Town Swifts, and goalkeeper Charles Partridge from Wednesbury Old Athletic.

The club's intended new kit – a plain royal blue shirt and stockings with white knickerbockers – failed to arrive by the start of the season, so the team began the new campaign in the previous year's black shirts with an amber collar, white knickerbockers and black stockings, which had proved difficult to see for players and spectators alike. When the new kit arrived ahead of the match against Sunderland Albion in mid-September, the suppliers had sent only nine sets, so they had to play one more game in the old colours. Will Devey was captain.

== Season review ==
=== September–October ===
The season opened with a friendly against local Football League club Aston Villa, who suffered a defeat that was "little short of humiliating, and altogether unexpected, even by adherents of Small Heath who had been looking forward to the contest with feelings of apprehension". The visitors "thoroughly deserved their pronounced and handsome victory", by four goals to nil in a rough game, in which "play was once stopped for some minutes due to one of the Villa men having been badly kicked, and subsequently the Villa goal-keeper and one of the Small Heath players came very nearly to fighting."

The Football Alliance season began with a visit to Walsall Town Swifts in summery weather. Will Devey opened the scoring, but Swifts asserted their superiority and led by three goals at the interval; Small Heath regrouped, and the second half brought one goal for each side. On "one of the hottest days of the whole year", Small Heath had intended to introduce their new blue-and-white kit for the visit of Sunderland Albion, but had to revert to the "old and dismal black-and-amber jerseys" when they discovered the suppliers had sent only nine sets of clothing. Chris Charsley kept goal, apparently having postponed his retirement, and Small Heath played well in losing 3–0. The Post commented favourably on Fred Speller at full-back and on half-backs Harry Morris and Ted Devey, and described how "the ponderous Jenkins did much useful work in his usual inelegant fashion."

A strong Small Heath team played a "dashing" game in a 3–1 friendly defeat away to West Bromwich Albion, but took the next friendly, a 3–0 win at home to Midland League club Warwick County, rather less seriously. The Post's correspondent thought Speller was "always safe and judicious" and his full-back partner Tom Bayley had improved since the Sunderland game, but was unimpressed by Charles Partridge's goalkeeping. The forwards passed well but missed too many chances in the Alliance match away to Grimsby Town as Heath lost 3–1.

October began with the first qualifying round of the 1890–91 FA Cup at home to Hednesford Town, who went into the match unbeaten, having scored 50 goals and conceded just 3. After the kickoff was delayed while the Small Heath team had their photographs taken, Hednesford were outclassed 8–0. Despite fears that the attendance at The Wednesday's first home Alliance game of the season would be adversely affected by the minimum admission charge being raised to 4d. and by Sheffield United arranging a friendly for the same day, a crowd of 7,000 watched Small Heath secure their first point of the season. The visitors settled down only after Wednesday had taken the lead, and struck the crossbar twice before Billy Walton took advantage of a poor clearance to tie the scores. Two minutes later, Will Devey scored with a low shot, but "one of the best got goals ever scored on Olive Grove", a fine team attack finished by Harry Winterbottom, made the half-time score 2–2. Jack Hallam's long shot regained the lead for Heath soon after the interval, but Wednesday levelled the scores again late in the game after strong attacking pressure.

A strong wind blowing towards the Charles Road end was instrumental in settling the visit of Walsall Town Swifts in the Alliance: in a match with "a great deal of bumping, but very little science", Swifts scored when the wind was in their favour, Small Heath did not. The Post attributed the lack of a detailed match report on the 3–3 friendly draw with West Bromwich Albion to its reporter's inability to find space in the press hut after it was invaded by spectators seeking shelter from the rain.

The Football Alliance fined Small Heath and three other clubs £1 each for not notifying the secretary of their results, a minor failure in administrative competence compared with what was to follow. In the second qualifying round of the FA Cup, Small Heath had a harder time than perhaps they expected in beating Wednesbury Old Athletic by two goals. Credit was as much due to Charsley, Speller and Jenkyns in defence as to the goalscorers. But their efforts were in vain, as Wednesbury's protest, that Charlie Short had not been registered in time to play in the match, was upheld, and Small Heath were disqualified from the competition. The local press was scathing: the Post called it "quite the most egregious blunder which has been perpetrated in football circles this season", and supposed that "the veriest tyro in the winter pastime would have known better than to spoil the club's chances for fame in such an absurd way".

=== November–December ===
Small Heath went into November bottom of the Alliance with only one point, and approached the encounter with league leaders Stoke "intend[ing] at least to test the opponents' mettle". They did rather better than that. In a fast-paced game, they took a two-goal lead in the first half and scored another three in the second, Stoke's only reply coming from Ted Devey's own goal. Walter Ward's debut in goal in a 1–1 draw at Bootle attracted praise from the Liverpool Mercury, as did his defence, and the quickness on the ball and combination play of the forwards, particularly Hallam and Will Devey, was also noted. Small Heath arranged a friendly with Burslem Port Vale for the day allocated for the next round of the Association Cup. Heath's forwards combined well in attack and shot accurately to score five goals (with several disallowed) to Vale's one.

In contrast, the forwards performed with "little cohesion, and were especially weak in front of goal" on their return to Alliance competition at home to Darwen. Arthur Turner, in what was to be his only appearance in league competition, was a poor substitute for Short, and neither Will Devey nor Charsley were at their best, the latter putting through his own net with an attempted clearance. At 4–1 behind with little time remaining, the home side adopted a more direct style of play that brought two goals, but Darwen held on for the win. Their next match, a visit to local rivals Birmingham St George's, took a similar course. On a pitch with a thick covering of snow, Saints took a three-goal lead before Heath recovered their competitiveness, and the game reached half-time with the score 4–2. John Devey increased Saints' lead, but after Fred Wheldon had a goal disallowed, Hallam scored twice, and Saints were hard pressed to stop their visitors gaining an unlikely draw. The Post warned that "if Small Heath seriously contemplate winning another Alliance match this season, it will be necessary for their players to make a more sustained effort during the progress of the game, and not wait until the last twenty minutes before they afford the spectators a glimpse of their proper form."

On the next Monday, those few spectators not discouraged by the wintry weather watched an attractive and well-contested 2–2 draw with Aston Villa in a friendly at Coventry Road, followed a few days later by a rather more lacklustre friendly against Derby Midland that finished with the same score. Alliance competition resumed with a visit to Newton Heath. On a hard pitch, Small Heath attacked from the start, playing a passing game, but failed to convert any of their chances. Newton Heath scored either side of the interval, each goal going in off a Small Heath full back, then, after Hallam scored with a high shot, a lively finish to the game produced a third home goal.

After a trial in the Port Vale friendly in November, Tommy Hands made his competitive debut for Small Heath away to Stoke, playing at outside left alongside Wheldon; he was to play nearly 150 matches for the club over the next six seasons. Short gave the visitors an early lead, and the defence held out for half an hour before conceding to a scrimmage. In the second half, Short regained the lead, but soon after Stoke equalised again, Walter Ward was injured and had to leave the field. Stoke took full advantage of their extra man and the Small Heath defence weakened by Fred Speller taking over in goal; they forced two more goals to take the match 4–2 and return their opponents to the bottom of the table.

=== January–February ===
Playing under protest because of the slippery playing surface, Small Heath lost their opening match of 1891 at Darwen by five goals to three. The Birmingham Daily Post thought the practice of playing under protest was disruptive both to clubs and supporters, and it was high time the leagues ruled that if a match takes place at all, and bad light or extreme weather does not prevent its completion, then the result should stand. On 10 January, The Wednesday were the first visitors to Coventry Road after a spell of weather so cold that even before Christmas the pools in Birmingham's parks had been overcrowded with skaters; the pitch was several inches deep in snow, but playable. Speller made several mistakes early in the game which Wednesday failed to punish, but once Wheldon opened the scoring, the match became one-sided. At Wednesday's request, the Sheffield Association had restricted to two the number of their players selected for the annual inter-association match against Glasgow scheduled for the same day, but their absence had an adverse effect. After half-time, the Small Heath forwards, with Will Devey partnering Hallam on the right wing and Short in Devey's usual position in the centre, "commenced to play with a vigour and cleverness they have rarely before shown this season", and were seven goals to the good before Charsley fumbled a ball to allow the visitors a late consolation.

Small Heath failed to progress past their opening match in the Birmingham Cup, on a "dreadfully hard and slippery" pitch covered with straw at West Bromwich Albion's ground. They led 2–1, and appeared to have increased that lead, but the referee, who was unsighted and whose umpires disagreed as to the goal's validity, could not be sure the ball had crossed the line. Ted Devey's half-back play, particularly his constructive use of the ball, was praised, as was Jenkyns' physicality, but Albion still scored twice without reply in the second half. The referee realised he might have been mistaken, and attempted to have the match replayed, but the result stood. The Alliance meeting with Birmingham St George's, scheduled for 24 January, was postponed because the latter club's Association Cup tie took precedence, so Small Heath finished January with a comfortable victory in a friendly against Kidderminster.

Alliance competition resumed with a fast-paced, open game in which Small Heath beat Crewe Alexandra 4–3. Villa had the better of an ill-tempered friendly, in which former policeman Caesar Jenkyns and Villa's Tom McKnight were sent off after indulging in "an unseemly and violent bout of fisticuffs". In Jenkyns' absence, the 36-year-old Charlie Simms played his first and only league match of the season, at home to Grimsby Town. Short scored early in the second half, but the forwards lacked composure in front of goal, and despite Charsley's best efforts, Grimsby scored twice. After the match, the Post's correspondent described Small Heath as "a most erratic combination". As if to illustrate the point, they beat leading club Nottingham Forest twice in three days. At Nottingham, on a frosty pitch with bright, low sun that made goalkeeping difficult, the two teams scored alternately, Forest taking the lead and Heath equalising, until 4–4, when Short's 73rd-minute winner inflicted Forest's first home league defeat of the season. At Coventry Road, the good weather and the previous result attracted a large crowd, and kickoff was delayed for half an hour. When play did begin, Small Heath's "forwards were smart and quick on the ball, passed judiciously and accurately, and shot with precision and power" in a 4–2 win. The Post echoed its earlier assessment: "there are no half measures about the Coventry Road players; they are either very good or very bad."

=== March–April ===
March began with an even game against Newton Heath. The visitors took the lead early in the first half when the ball was adjudged over the line before Charsley cleared, and Wheldon equalised shortly before the interval. Constant pressing in the second half was repulsed by the Newton Heath defence, and Wheldon failed to convert with only the goalkeeper to beat, then, two minutes from time, Wheldon was successful from a similar position and Small Heath won 2–1. Their defence was much weakened by the inclusion of Fred Heath in place of Caesar Jenkyns, and Birmingham St George's won the postponed match quite easily. At home to Bootle, Ward came in for Charsley in goal, and Albert Evers, making his league debut, and Charsley's brother Walter came in to the half-back line instead of Heath and the still-absent Jenkyns. The scores were level at one apiece until nearing half-time, when Charlie Short scored three goals in as many minutes; another three in the second half, for Devey, Hands and Wheldon, secured a 7–1 win and lifted Small Heath to ninth place in the table.

On the Saturday of the Easter weekend, Small Heath achieved an unexpected victory in a friendly against West Bromwich Albion. Playing with the benefit of a cold wind at their backs, Wheldon gained a first-half lead, but Albion's defence was too strong for that lead to be increased. Against the wind in the second half, Short fell over in the act of shooting before Wheldon scored again, and however hard Albion tried, they could only pull one goal back. On Easter Monday, Heath suffered a heavy defeat at Middlesbrough Ironopolis in a friendly; the match was goalless at half-time, but once "the home team no longer had the sun in their eyes", the score rose regularly. They did little better in the Alliance at Sunderland Albion the next day, where "the home side had three-fourths of the play to themselves, and exhibited their superiority from start to finish" as they won by four goals to nil.

A friendly played in a downpour at Coventry Road, won by Aston Villa by five goals to four with the last kick of the game, preceded the meeting of the same two clubs in the Birmingham Charity Cup at the County Cricket Ground. On "a perfect quagmire" of a pitch, "accurate and scientific football was out of the question", and Villa won 3–1 to reach the final. Small Heath's competitive programme ended with a heavy defeat at Crewe Alexandra that confirmed their tenth-place finish in the Alliance. Three friendlies against local opposition completed their season. Three Warwick County players were tried out in the 3–2 defeat of Wolverhampton Wanderers; the winning goal was scored by Will Devey, who was confirmed to be joining Wolverhampton for the coming season. A poor performance earned Small Heath a thrashing at Walsall Town Swifts, and in the last match of the campaign, neither club fielded its strongest eleven as Small Heath beat Birmingham St George's 2–0.

== Summary and aftermath ==
Throughout the season, the team's two main problems were inconsistency and the inability to keep a clean sheet. On too many occasions, a fine display alternated with a collapse; at least one goal was conceded in every Alliance match, at least three goals in 14 of the 22. The tenth-place finish, with one point fewer than in their first season, was a fair reflection of their performances. At the Annual General Meeting of the Football Alliance, the bottom four teams were all re-elected. The club was £234 in debt at the end of the season. The Birmingham Daily Post suggested that

Misfortune and mismanagement did them considerable damage during the cup-tie crisis, and towards the latter end of the season the team did not get the encouragement it deserved from the public; but with a larger staff of directors and an infusion of new blood into the team it is hoped that Small Heath patrons will be induced to encourage an old and respected club.

In February, it was reported that the Devey brothers intended to stay with Small Heath, but it was a decision dependent "on circumstances over which finance has sole control." By April, it was confirmed that Will Devey, top scorer both this season and last, was to join Football League club Wolverhampton Wanderers. Caesar Jenkyns succeeded him as captain. New players ahead of the 1891–92 season included the former Warwick County players George Hollis (goalkeeper), Billy Ollis (centre half) and Fred Wilkes (centre forward), who were tried out in an end-of-season friendly. Arthur Carter, a forward who had also signed from Warwick County, was obliged to retire on medical advice after a serious leg injury.

== Match details ==
For consistency, attendances and goalscorers' names in the Football Alliance and FA Cup match details are sourced from Matthews (2010). Information in contemporary newspaper reports could, and often did, differ.

=== Football Alliance ===
Date	Opponents	Venue	Result	Score F–A	Scorers	Attendance
6 September 1890	Walsall Town Swifts	A	L	2–5	W. Devey, Reynolds o.g.	5,000
13 September 1890	Sunderland Albion	H	L	0–3		5,000
27 September 1890	Grimsby Town	A	L	1–3	Jenkyns	2,000
11 October 1890	Sheffield Wednesday	A	D	3–3	Walton, W. Devey, Hallam	7,000
18 October 1890	Walsall Town Swifts	H	L	0–1		5,000
1 November 1890	Stoke	H	W	5–1	Short 3, Wheldon, W. Devey	2,500
8 November 1890	Bootle	A	D	1–1	W. Devey	1,000
22 November 1890	Darwen	H	L	3–4	Hallam 3	2,000
29 November 1890	Birmingham St George's	A	L	4–5	E. Devey, W. Devey, Short, Hallam	2,000
13 December 1890	Newton Heath	A	L	1–3	Hallam	1,000
27 December 1890	Stoke	A	L	2–4	Short 2	3,000
3 January 1891	Darwen	A	L	3–5	W. Devey, Hallam, Wheldon	3,000
10 January 1891	Sheffield Wednesday	H	W	7–1	Wheldon, Short 2, Jenkyns 2, W. Devey 2	500
2 February 1891	Crewe Alexandra	H	W	4–3	W. Devey 3, Wheldon	2,000
21 February 1891	Grimsby Town	H	L	1–2	Short	2,000
26 February 1891	Nottingham Forest	A	W	5–4	Hallam, Jenkyns, W. Devey, Short, Not known og	2,500
28 February 1891	Nottingham Forest	H	W	4–2	Short 3, Wheldon	5,000
7 March 1891	Newton Heath	H	W	2–1	Wheldon 2	2,000
16 March 1891	Birmingham St George's	H	L	1–4	Hands	1,000
21 March 1891	Bootle	H	W	7–1	Short 3, Hands 2, W. Devey, Wheldon	1,000
31 March 1891	Sunderland Albion	A	L	0–4		3,000
11 April 1891	Crewe Alexandra	A	L	2–6	W. Devey 2	1,000

==== League table ====
Pos	Team	Pld	W	D	L	GF	GA	GAv	Pts
8	Crewe Alexandra	22	8	4	10	59	67	0.881	20
9	Newton Heath	22	7	3	12	37	55	0.673	17
10	Small Heath	22	7	2	13	58	66	0.879	16
11	Bootle	22	3	7	12	40	61	0.656	13
12	The Wednesday	22	4	5	13	39	66	0.591	13

Rules for classification: 1) points; 2) goal average.

=== FA Cup ===
Round	Date	Opponents	Venue	Result	Score F–A	Scorers	Attendance
First qual	4 October 1890	Hednesford Town	H	W	8–0	Wheldon 3, Hallam, W. Devey 2, Jenkyns, Webster og	1,500
Second qual	6 December 1890	Wednesbury Old Athletic	A	W	2–0*	Short, Hallam	4,000

* Small Heath disqualified for fielding the unregistered player Charlie Short

=== Birmingham Senior Cup ===
Round	Date	Opponents	Venue	Result	Score F–A	Scorers	Attendance	Ref
First	17 January 1890	West Bromwich Albion	A	L	2–3	Devey, "Scrimmage"	2,000	

=== Mayor of Birmingham's Charity Cup ===
Round	Date	Opponents	Venue	Result	Score F–A	Scorers	Attendance	Ref
Semi-final	6 April 1891	Aston Villa	Edgbaston Cricket Ground	L	1–3	Not known		

=== Other matches ===
Date	Opponents	Venue	Result	Score F–A	Scorers	Attendance	Notes
1 September 1890	Aston Villa	A	W	4–0	W. Devey, Walton, not known, scrimmage	3–4,000	Friendly match
15 September 1890	West Bromwich Albion	A	L	1–3	Pratt	"A moderate number"	Friendly match
20 September 1890	Warwick County	H	W	3–0	Walton, Hallam, Wheldon	c. 1,500	Friendly match
20 October 1890	West Bromwich Albion	H	D	3–3	Not known (3)	"Not large"	Friendly match
15 November 1890	Burslem Port Vale	H	W	5–1	Hallam, "rush", Wheldon 2, W. Devey	"Rather thin"	Friendly match
1 December 1890	Aston Villa	H	D	2–2	W. Devey, Wheldon	"Moderate"	Friendly match
6 December 1890	Derby Midland	H	D	2–2	Wheldon, W. Devey	"Sparse"	Friendly match
31 January 1891	Kidderminster	H	W	4–1	Short 2, Hallam, not known		Friendly match
14 February 1891	Aston Villa	A	L	0–3		"Fully 4,000"	Friendly match
28 March 1891	West Bromwich Albion	H	W	2–1	Wheldon 2	"Capital"	Friendly match
30 March 1891	Middlesbrough Ironopolis	A	L	1–6	Wheldon		Friendly match
4 April 1891	Aston Villa	H	L	4–5	Hands, W. Devey 2, Wheldon	3,000	Friendly match
18 April 1891	Wolverhampton Wanderers	H	W	3–2	Hands, Wheldon, W. Devey	"Large"	Friendly match
25 April 1891	Walsall Town Swifts	A	L	1–6	Wheldon	c. 2,000	Friendly match
27 April 1891	Birmingham St George's	H	W	2–0	Wilkes, Wheldon	"Small"	Friendly match

== Appearances and goals ==
This table includes appearances and goals in nationally organised competitive matches – the Football Alliance and FA Cup – only.
For a description of the playing positions, see Formation (association football)#2–3–5 (Pyramid).

Players' appearances and goals by competition
Name	Position	Alliance		FA Cup		Total	
Name	Position	Apps	Goals	Apps	Goals	Apps	Goals
Chris Charsley	Goalkeeper	14	0	2	0	16	0
Charles Partridge	Goalkeeper	3	0	0	0	3	0
Walter Ward	Goalkeeper	5	0	0	0	5	0
Tom Bayley	Full back	22	0	2	0	24	0
Fred Speller	Full back	22	0	2	0	24	0
Walter Charsley	Half back	3	0	0	0	3	0
Ted Devey	Half back	20	1	2	0	22	1
Albert Evers	Half back	2	0	0	0	2	0
Frederick Heath	Half back	8	0	0	0	8	0
Jack Hughes	Half back	1	0	0	0	1	0
Caesar Jenkyns	Half back	17	4	2	1	22	5
Harry Morris	Half back	13	0	2	0	15	0
Charlie Simms	Half back	1	0	0	0	1	0
James Wollaston	Half back	1	0	0	0	1	0
Will Devey	Forward	22	15	2	2	24	17
Jack Hallam	Forward	22	8	2	2	24	10
Tommy Hands	Forward	12	3	0	0	12	3
Billy Pratt	Forward	10	0	2	0	12	0
Charlie Short	Forward	17	16	1	1	18	17
Arthur Turner	Forward	1	0	0	0	1	0
Billy Walton	Forward	4	1	1	0	5	1
Fred Wheldon	Forward	22	8	2	3	24	11

== See also ==
- Birmingham City F.C. seasons
