= 1891–92 Small Heath F.C. season =

Small Heath F.C.
1891–92 season
- Chairman: Walter W. Hart
- Secretary: Alfred Jones
- Ground: Coventry Road
- Football Alliance: 3rd (of 12)
- FA Cup: Second round proper (eliminated by Sheffield Wednesday)
- Birmingham Senior Cup: Second round (eliminated by West Bromwich Albion)
- Birmingham Charity Cup: Runners-up (eliminated by Wolverhampton Wanderers)
- Top goalscorer: League: Fred Wheldon (21); All: Fred Wheldon (29)
- Highest home attendance: 3,500 vs Nottingham Forest (16 April 1892)
- Lowest home attendance: 600 vs Crewe Alexandra (12 December 1891)
Team colours

The 1891–92 season was the 11th season of competitive association football played by Small Heath Football Club, an English football club based in the Small Heath district of Birmingham, and their third season in the Football Alliance. At the end of the season, in which Small Heath finished in third position, most of the teams were absorbed into the newly formed Second Division of the Football League, and the Alliance folded for lack of membership.

Small Heath entered the 1891–92 FA Cup at the first qualifying round stage. They progressed to the second round proper (last 16), but forfeited home advantage to Sheffield Wednesday for a payment of £200 and lost 2–0. In local competitions, they were eliminated by West Bromwich Albion in the second round of the Birmingham Senior Cup and by Wolverhampton Wanderers in the final of the Mayor of Birmingham's Charity Cup. Small Heath also played several friendly matches during the season.

Small Heath used 23 different players in nationally organised competitive matches during the season and had eleven different goalscorers. Five players, full-back Fred Speller, half-backs Ted Devey and Billy Ollis, and forwards Jack Hallam and Fred Wheldon, were ever-present over the 29-match season. The top scorer was inside-forward Wheldon with 29 goals in all competitions, of which 21 were scored in the Alliance. Caesar Jenkyns became the first player to be capped for his country while a Small Heath player when he took the field for Wales against Ireland on 27 February 1892.

== Background ==
At the Annual General Meeting of the Football Alliance, the bottom four teams, of which Small Heath was one, were all re-elected. The club were £234 in debt at the end of the season. The Birmingham Daily Post suggested that

Misfortune and mismanagement did them considerable damage during the cup-tie crisis, (Note: The club were eliminated from the 1890–91 FA Cup after fielding an ineligible player.) and towards the latter end of the season the team did not get the encouragement it deserved from the public; but with a larger staff of directors and an infusion of new blood into the team it is hoped that Small Heath patrons will be induced to encourage an old and respected club.

Players leaving included Will Devey, top scorer in the previous two seasons, who joined Football League club Wolverhampton Wanderers. New players included the former Warwick County players George Hollis (goalkeeper), Billy Ollis (centre half) and Frederick Wilkes (centre forward). In a friendly match against Wolverhampton Wanderers at the end of the previous season, Hollis appeared to lack confidence, Ollis "would have been more useful if he had looked after the ball a little more instead of his opponents", and Wilkes' passing was wild but did "some smart work" and contributed to a goal with "exceedingly plucky play". Arthur Carter, a forward who had also joined Small Heath from Warwick County, was obliged to retire on medical advice after a serious leg injury. The Post kept up its encouragement:

If the Coventry Road people can command good "gates" for a start, and come safely through the majority of their early trials, they have a good-hearted set of followers, who will give them every encouragement. The loss of W. Devey is undoubtedly severe, but there are some capital recruits. In Hollies Small Heath have a keeper of both ability and modesty – a virtue which has not shone conspicuously in that direction for some years – and good reports are to hand of a very promising young local back named Taylor. The half-backs are clever and have already made a reputation, and the front rank should prove strong enough to play their opponents a capital game.

The team played in the same kit as in the previous season: royal blue shirts and stockings with white knickerbockers. Caesar Jenkyns was captain.

== Review ==
=== September–October ===
George Hollis's goalkeeping came in for praise as Small Heath began their season in a howling gale, despite Aston Villa beating their visitors 5–1 in a friendly match. The committee experimented with their team selection for the first Alliance match of the season, at home to Burton Swifts, Fred Speller moving up from full back to partner Jack Hallam on the right side of the forward line. Small Heath took an early lead through a combination of Frederick Wilkes and Hallam, but Burton, showing more skill than the home forwards, equalised in the first half. After the interval, Hallam scored after Wilkes' shot was parried, then Wilkes himself made the final score 3–1. Despite playing into the sun, Birmingham St George's took a first-half lead, increased early in the second half. Small Heath's shooting was poor throughout, but Walter Brown eventually scored with a header from Tommy Hands' cross, and on the stroke of time, Hands himself secured a "lucky draw". A "sturdy, bustling game" got the better of West Bromwich Albion in a friendly by four goals to nil, Hallam contributing three and Billy Walton the fourth. Billy Ollis had to leave the field with a damaged eye after colliding with fellow half back Caesar Jenkyns.

Four goals to one adrift by half time in the reverse fixture at Burton Swifts, Small Heath "never looked likely to get on even terms" as they lost 6–3. A friendly visit to Wolverhampton Wanderers on a slippery surface was ended with 15 minutes still to go, because of rain and poor visibility, with Wanderers 2–0 ahead. Although a Small Heath team weakened by injury beat Lincoln City 4–0, the Birmingham Daily Post suggested that "if the forwards would learn to understand each other's movements and play a collective game, instead of trying to shine individually, the result would be a great deal more beneficial" to the club. They finished September in second place in the Alliance, behind Nottingham Forest, who had won all four of their matches.

October began with a comfortable victory, by six goals to two, at Leicester Fosse in the first qualifying round of the 1891–92 FA Cup. There followed two Alliance games in three days. On the Thursday, Nottingham Forest scored two second-half goals to take an end-to-end game. On the Saturday, Small Heath started the match at home to Sheffield Wednesday on a Coventry Road pitch with pools of standing water and with only nine men. Once the latecomers arrived, the home team made a better fight of it, and Arthur Millard opened the scoring early in the second half. Wednesday soon equalised, and Small Heath, down to ten men because of a leg injury to Tommy Hands, held on for a draw. By the next Saturday, the playing surface had improved to greasy. Visitors Walsall Town Swifts scored first after about 20 minutes, which provoked Small Heath into action, and the remainder of the game was one-sided, finishing as a 4–1 home win. The Post heaped particular praise on the half-back line, Ollis, Jenkyns and Ted Devey, who "worked wonders, for they not only checkmated their opponents, but fed their own forwards very judiciously, and were always ready to assist in the defence when the necessity arose."

Small Heath visited Burton Wanderers in the second qualifying round of the FA Cup. After a fruitless wait for the allotted referee, the match began with a substitute official. Heath scored from their first attack, after which Wanderers adopted physical tactics, Small Heath joined in, and the quality of the game deteriorated. After Wanderers equalised, Tommy Hands received a kick on the temple – the player habitually stooped low to head the ball – and the ten men of Small Heath settled for a draw. The draw cost Small Heath £20, to be paid to Lincoln City, their scheduled opponents for the following Saturday, in compensation for their match being postponed to accommodate the Cup replay. Wanderers put up a better show in the replay, and Small Heath's half backs were "unaccountably insecure", but strong defensive play by goalkeeper Chris Charsley and full backs Tom Bayley and Fred Speller allowed Heath to cling on to a 2–1 win.

=== November–December ===
Small Heath included a trialist, centre-forward Young of local team Unity Gas, in their team for a friendly at home to Wolverhampton Wanderers; the match finished as a three-all draw. They disposed of Burton Swifts in the third qualifying round of the FA Cup by four goals to two. The forwards' combination play and their confidence made the difference between the two sides, despite Harry Morris, playing at centre-forward, missing several chances, aided by the half-back pair of Jenkyns and Devey, "whose power and activity at heading is almost proverbial". Swifts protested to the Football Association about the unfitness of the Coventry Road ground, but their protest was dismissed. Small Heath allowed Chris Charsley to join Football League club West Bromwich Albion.

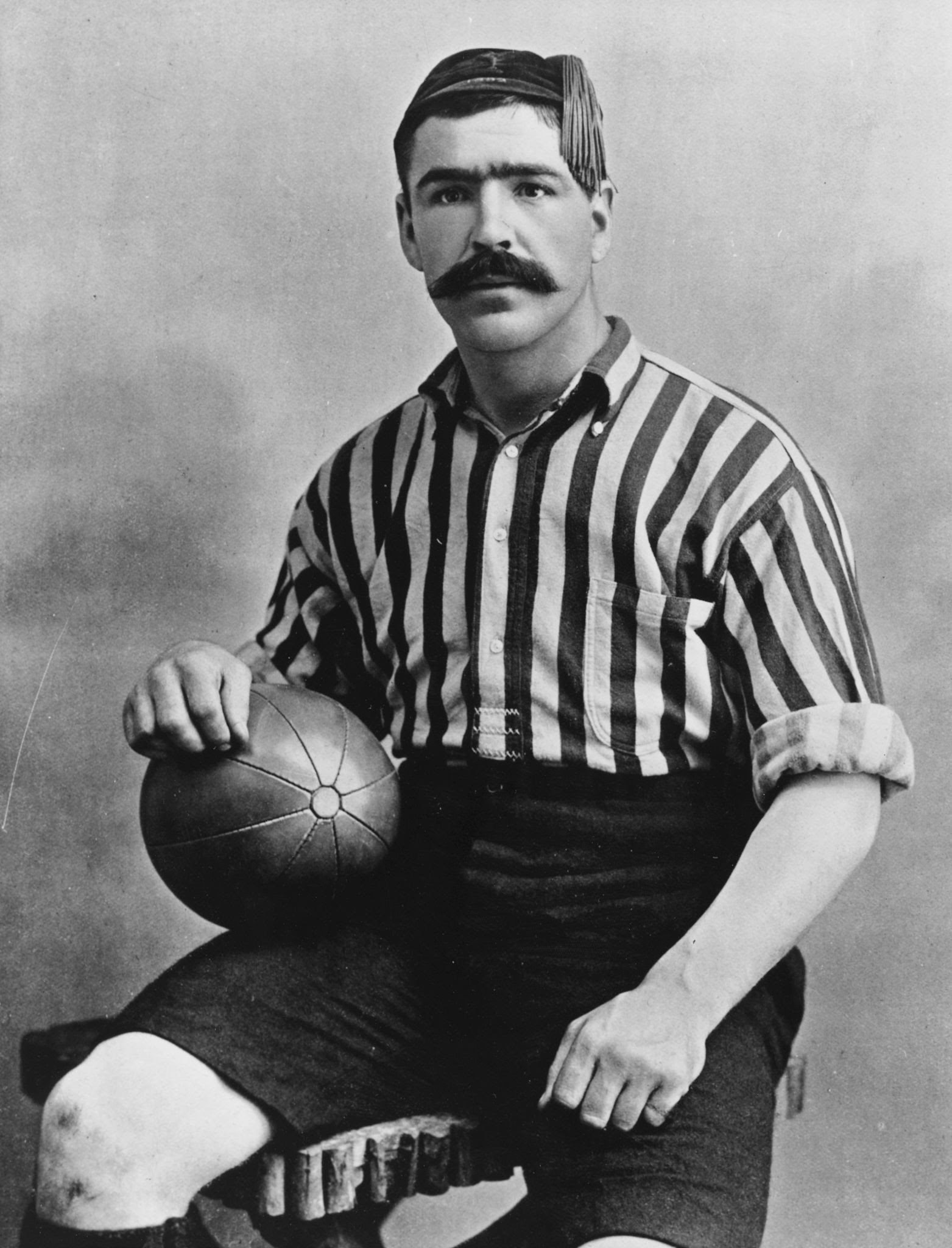
Caesar Jenkyns, Small Heath's captain

His successor, George Hollis, enjoyed a fortunate visit to Bootle in the Alliance. The Liverpool Mercury reported the referee was not in a position to spot that Hollis had caught Jamieson's low shot "apparently ... a foot over the line", and Caesar Jenkyns' first-half goal decided the contest. A "storm of wind and rain" reduced the attendance for the visit to local rivals Birmingham St George's to around 500, but those few present accompanied the play with "a running fire of vigorously-expressed comments", and on each occasion that Jenkyns ended up on the ground, "his downfall appeared to give unspeakable pleasure to the home supporters, who rejoiced greatly as he gradually became plastered in mud from head to foot." After two goals were disallowed for offside, St George's won an understandably poor game with a single legitimate goal, scored late on.

Charsley returned to represent Small Heath in the final qualifying round of the FA Cup against Brierley Hill Alliance. Wheldon gave Heath a very early lead, but sloppy play by the half-backs allowed the visitors an equaliser within two minutes. After which Small Heath took control of the game, without playing particularly well, and qualified for the rounds proper of the competition by a score of 6–2. They retained their unbeaten home record against Crewe Alexandra in the Alliance. On a pitch "in such a sodden state that it was impossible for the players to pass correctly or shoot with any degree with accuracy", Heath won 3–1 with goals from a Jenkyns free kick and two by Hallam. Off the field, Lincoln City successfully applied to the Football Alliance for Small Heath to pay forthwith the £20 owed them for agreeing to rearrange their match.

Aided by "exceptionally fine goalkeeping by Hollies, and the sturdy defence of Jenkins, Bailey, and Speller", and by James Lundie's own goal, a 2–1 win at Grimsby Town proved an "agreeable surprise" to the Birmingham Daily Post's correspondent. Christmas Day's entertainment consisted of a friendly at home to Aston Villa on an icy pitch; neither club fielded a full-strength side, but the visitors were still good enough to win 3–0. The next day's visit to second-placed Newton Heath came close to producing a surprise. Small Heath led 3–0 at half-time, but were unable to hold on to their lead, Newton Heath equalising through Alf Farman just before the final whistle.

=== January–February ===
Small Heath began the new year with a 2–2 draw at Ardwick, a result highlighted by sound defence and the goalkeeping of Charsley, which left them in fourth place in the Alliance, having played fewer games than two of the three above them. Wilbert Harrison scored both goals either side of the half-time interval in what proved his only appearance for the club in national competition. Despite losing several players to representative duty for the Sheffield Association in Glasgow, Sheffield Wednesday enjoyed a comfortable win at home to Small Heath on a pitch with a light covering of snow. In the first 20 minutes, each side scored twice and the visitors had two further "goals" disallowed for offside, but on change of ends, Wednesday took control and the match ended 6–3. The Sheffield & Rotherham Independent picked out Jenkyns as playing "a sturdy and able game".

The Daily Post's confidence about Small Heath's prospects in the FA Cup – although "on paper form the Royal Arsenal appear to be formidable foes to grapple with, Small Heath have come through harder things than this, and are pretty sure of getting into the second round" – proved justified. Heath took advantage of the wind in the first half to take a four-goal lead, and although Royal Arsenal had the better of the second half, the match finished as a 5–1 win. The Arsenal had included professionals in their team in the hope of progressing in the competition, but, according to the Pall Mall Gazette, they were "outplayed in every department of the game", and the Standard suggested that "many lovers of football will not be disappointed at this result", viewing the attempted introduction of professionalism amongst the southern clubs as a failed experiment. The scheduled visit to Crewe Alexandra on the following Saturday had to be postponed, because the Football Association ordered that club to replay their FA Cup tie on that date, so a friendly at Newton Heath was arranged at short notice. A below-strength Small Heath team lost 7–2, both goals scored by Wilbert Harrison.

Heath were drawn to play Sheffield Wednesday in the second round of the Cup, and had choice of venue, but were quick to accept an offer of £200 to switch the game to Wednesday's Olive Grove ground, "a telegram to that effect being posted on the front of the stand at the conclusion of Saturday's match". Wednesday won the toss and chose to play with the benefit of the strong wind at their backs. They took a first-half lead, but Small Heath held their own. The play became increasingly rough, the Sheffield Independent suggesting that "several of the Heathens began to use their weight mercilessly", and Wednesday's claim for a penalty kick after one of the visiting backs handled the ball over the crossbar was turned down by the referee. Wednesday players Duncan Gemmell and Richardson were sent off, for kicking and striking an opponent respectively, but despite the numerical disadvantage their team increased their lead late on. The referee, Mr Widdowson, needed police protection from spectators throwing mud and other missiles as he left the field, though the Independent's correspondent suggested he had brought the problem on himself by failing to apply "a little more severity when the roughness first commenced". In consequence, the two dismissed players were each suspended for one week (such a lenient punishment perhaps in recognition "that it was really six of one and half a dozen of the other in the matter of rough play"), the Olive Grove ground was closed for two weeks, and Ted Devey, the player struck by Richardson, was asked to explain his conduct during the match.

The next game was a rather quieter affair, as Heath beat Ladywood Conservatives, who had progressed through the qualifying competition to the first round of the Birmingham Cup, by seven goals to nil without unduly exerting themselves. In the Alliance, the rearranged visit to Lincoln City produced a one-all draw, Heath's goal scored by Wheldon from a left-wing cross. When Devey appeared in front of the Football Association to answer his charge of misconduct, the Council found no cause for inquiry, expressed regret for wasting his time, and paid his expenses. This would come as little surprise to the Independent, who blamed Caesar Jenkyns for starting the trouble by injuring Bob Brown early in the game.

Ardwick had the better of the first half of their visit to a snowy Coventry Road, but Small Heath scored twice coming up to the interval, and the second half was one-sided as Heath won 4–0, though "the number of chances that Morris literally threw away by rash and reckless play in front of goal was enough to exasperate the best-tempered supporter of the home club." The last match of the month was at home to second-placed Newton Heath in the absence of Jenkyns, who made his international debut for Wales in a 1–1 draw with Ireland at Bangor that day, becoming the first man to play a senior international while a Small Heath player. Bill Taylor took his place as Small Heath won a well-contested game by three goals to two, narrowing the gap between the teams to four points with four matches of the season remaining.

=== March–May ===
Jenkyns kept his place for Wales's 2–0 defeat to England the following Saturday, when Small Heath had no game. According to the Wrexham Advertiser, he was "the best of the halves. He was a bit slow, but his heading and tackling were very fine." A friendly match at home to Football League club Bolton Wanderers produced a 7–0 win for Small Heath, which "must have come as a great surprise to the supporters of either team". When they finally returned to Alliance action, at home to Bootle, they were again without Jenkyns, who was making his third appearance of the 1892 British Home Championship in a 6–1 defeat to Scotland. William Kendrick took his place, and reserve-team colleague Len Curryer replaced Morris at centre forward. Bootle had the better of the early game, and took the lead, but Heath came back with two goals from Wheldon, who also had a penalty saved, and two from Walton; Bootle were reduced to ten men for the second half through injury to one of their half-backs. Two days later, FA Cup-winners West Bromwich Albion had no difficulty eliminating a full-strength Small Heath side from the Birmingham Senior Cup.

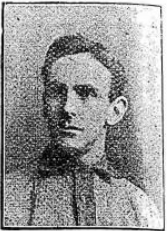
Fred Wheldon scored 29 goals this season.

Morris returned at home to Grimsby Town, a 3–0 win in which Wheldon scored in his fifth consecutive Alliance match. He scored his tenth goal in six Alliance matches the next week, away to Walsall Town Swifts, a match in which Walsall had the better of the first half but were outplayed in the second as Heath won 4–3. The result left the club still able to secure second place. A large holiday crowd at Plumstead saw Royal Arsenal have the better of a Good Friday friendly but lose to a second-half goal scored by Billy Walton. On Saturday, Heath played Nottingham Forest in an eventful game. Sloppy defending by Bayley and Hollis allowed Forest's Oscroft to open the scoring, but after half an hour he was "badly hurt" when charged by Jenkyns "in an unnecessarily severe manner". Their second goal was allowed despite apparently passing over rather than under the crossbar, clearly illustrating the value of goal nets, which were not yet required even at top level. Thereafter Forest defended their lead, which would confirm them as Alliance champions, and towards the end of the game, the "marked preference shown by several of the players for their opponents instead of the ball caus[ed] the play to degenerate from the high standard which marked the early stages". A 2–0 win at Crewe Alexandra gave Small Heath a third-place finish and took Wheldon's total for the season to 21 goals in 22 Alliance matches.

Football League runners-up and twice champions Preston North End sent an under-strength eleven for a friendly meeting with Small Heath. The team was further weakened when their trainer had to play in place of Bob Roberts, who failed to turn up, but they were still too good for their hosts. Aston Villa did much of the attacking in the semi-final of the Birmingham Charity Cup but Charsley and his defenders were up to their task, and Small Heath progressed to the final by two goals to nil. In the final, at Aston Lower Grounds, Hallam scored with a header after only five minutes, and failed to take a good chance when Wolverhampton Wanderers' goalkeeper lost his grip on the ball, but at the interval the score was 1–1. In the second half, with both sun and wind in their favour, Heath struck the woodwork several times, but the only goal came when an error from their backs allowed Harry Wood a free run.

== Summary and aftermath ==
The season was relatively successful after several years of declining interest. According to the Birmingham Daily Post, "Small Heath's improvement compared with last year is very marked, and at the present time the Coventry Road club is able to hold its own in the most select company." On the field, they improved to third in the Football Alliance after two previous tenth places, and their performance in the FA Cup earned them exemption from the qualifying competition for 1892–93. Off it, the Annual General Meeting of the club, held at Jenkins Street Board School in July 1892, heard that "skilful management, good matches, and capital 'gates'" had combined to produce a statement of financial affairs "distinctly creditable to managers and players", and the directors were to be congratulated. The club's application for election to the Football League First Division when it was expanded to 16 clubs was unsuccessful, but it was one of 12 clubs, mostly from the previous season's Football Alliance, elected to compete in the inaugural season of that league's Second Division. Alfred Jones had been acting as club secretary on a voluntary basis since 1885, when payment of players was first permitted. Prior to entering the Football League, the board of directors appointed him as the club's first paid official, as secretary-manager.

All the regular first-team members during the previous season remained with the club for the forthcoming Football League season, as did fringe players including the long-serving Charlie Simms, who was by 1892 employed as the first-team trainer, but retained his playing registration for emergencies. Among the newcomers were back Fred Jones from Newton Heath and forward Harry Edwards, signed from Singer's of Coventry,

== Match details ==
For consistency, attendances and goalscorers' names in the Football Alliance and FA Cup match details are sourced from Matthews (2010). Information in contemporary newspaper reports could, and often did, differ.

=== Football Alliance ===
Date	Opponents	Venue	Result	Score F–A	Scorers	Attendance
5 September 1891	Burton Swifts	H	W	3–1	Hallam 2, Wilkes	2,000
12 September 1891	Birmingham St George's	H	D	2–2	Brown, Hands	3,000
19 September 1891	Burton Swifts	H	L	3–6	Devey, Wheldon 2	2,000
26 September 1891	Lincoln City	H	W	4–0	Wheldon 3, Brown	2,000
8 October 1891	Nottingham Forest	A	L	0–2		2,000
10 October 1891	Sheffield Wednesday	H	D	1–1	Millard	1,000
17 October 1891	Walsall Town Swifts	H	W	4–1	Hands 2, Morris, Wheldon	2,000
21 November 1891	Bootle	A	W	1–0	Jenkyns	3,000
28 November 1891	Birmingham St George's	A	L	0–1		500
12 December 1891	Crewe Alexandra	H	W	3–1	Hallam 2, Jenkyns	600
19 December 1891	Grimsby Town	A	W	2–1	Lundie og, Hallam	1,000
26 December 1891	Newton Heath	A	D	3–3	Walton, Wheldon 2	7,000
2 January 1892	Ardwick	A	D	2–2	Harrison 2	3,000
9 January 1892	Sheffield Wednesday	A	L	3–6	Hallam, Walton, McConnachie og	5,000
13 February 1892	Lincoln City	A	D	1–1	Wheldon	2,000
20 February 1892	Ardwick	H	W	4–0	Wheldon 2, Hallam, Walton	2,000
27 February 1892	Newton Heath	H	W	3–2	Walton, Hallam, Wheldon	3,000
26 March 1892	Bootle	H	W	4–1	Walton 2, Wheldon 2	2,000
2 April 1892	Grimsby Town	H	W	3–0	Hallam, Wheldon 2	2,000
9 April 1892	Walsall Town Swifts	A	W	4–3	Hallam, Wheldon 2, Hands	4,000
16 April 1892	Nottingham Forest	A	L	1–2	Wheldon	3,500
20 April 1892	Crewe Alexandra	A	W	2–0	Wheldon 2	1,000

Pos	Team	Pld	W	D	L	GF	GA	GAv	Pts	Qualification or relegation
1	Nottingham Forest (C, P)	22	14	5	3	59	22	2.682	33	Elected to the Football League First Division
2	Newton Heath (P)	22	12	7	3	69	33	2.091	31	Elected to the Football League First Division
3	Small Heath (E)	22	12	5	5	53	36	1.472	29	Elected to the Football League Second Division
4	The Wednesday (P)	22	12	4	6	65	35	1.857	28	Elected to the Football League First Division
5	Burton Swifts (E)	22	12	2	8	54	52	1.038	26	Elected to the Football League Second Division

Rules for classification: 1) points; 2) goal average.
(C) Champions; (E) Elected to the Football League Second Division; (P) Promoted

=== FA Cup ===
Round	Date	Opponents	Venue	Result	Score F–A	Scorers	Attendance
First qual	3 October 1891	Leicester Fosse	A	W	6–2	Hands, Millard 2, Hallam, Wheldon 2	1,000
Second qual	24 October 1891	Burton Wanderers	A	D	1–1	Wheldon	4,000
Second qual replay	31 October 1891	Burton Wanderers	H	W	2–1	Taylor, Wheldon	2,000
Third qual	14 November 1891	Burton Swifts	H	W	4–2	Hands, Walton 2, Wheldon	3,000
Fourth qual	5 December 1891	Brierley Hill Alliance	H	W	6–2	Wheldon, Wilkes 3, Walton, Hands	1,000
First round	16 January 1892	Royal Arsenal	H	W	5–1	Hallam 2, Wheldon 2, Walton	4,000
Second round	30 January 1892	Sheffield Wednesday	A*	L	0–2		4,000

* Small Heath forfeited home advantage to Sheffield Wednesday for a £200 payment.

=== Birmingham Senior Cup ===
Round	Date	Opponents	Venue	Result	Score F–A	Scorers	Attendance	Ref
1st	6 February 1892	Ladywood Conservatives	H	W	7–0	Not known (7)	1,500	
2nd	28 March 1892	West Bromwich Albion	A	L	1–4	"Rush"	~3,000	

=== Mayor of Birmingham's Charity Cup ===
Round	Date	Opponents	Venue	Result	Score F–A	Scorers	Attendance	Ref
SF	25 April 1892	Aston Villa	H	W	3–1	Hands, not known	3,000	
Final	7 May 1892	Wolverhampton Wanderers	Aston Lower Grounds	L	1–2	Hallam	"Capital"	

=== Other matches ===
Date	Opponents	Venue	Result	Score F–A	Scorers	Attendance	Notes
1 September 1891	Aston Villa	A	L	1–5	Hands	3,000	Friendly match
14 September 1891	West Bromwich Albion	H	W	4–0	Hallam 3, Walton	"Meagre"	Friendly match
21 September 1891	Wolverhampton Wanderers	A	L	0–2		"A few"	Friendly match
2 November 1891	Wolverhampton Wanderers	H	D	3–3	Wheldon, Hallam, Walton	"Small"	Friendly match
25 December 1891	Aston Villa	H	L	0–3		~3,000	Friendly match
23 January 1892	Newton Heath	A	L	2–7	Harrison 2	"Good"	Friendly match
19 March 1892	Bolton Wanderers	H	W	7–0	Walton, Hallam 2, Wheldon 3, "Scrimmage"	"Large"	Friendly match
15 April 1892	Royal Arsenal	A	W	2–1	Not known, Walton	~8,000	Friendly match
23 April 1892	Preston North End	H	L	1–3	Wheldon	4,000	Friendly match

== Appearances and goals ==
This table includes appearances and goals in nationally organised competitive matches – the Football Alliance and FA Cup – only.
For a description of the playing positions, see Formation (association football)#2–3–5 (Pyramid).

Players' appearances and goals by competition
Name	Position	Alliance		FA Cup		Total	
Name	Position	Apps	Goals	Apps	Goals	Apps	Goals
Chris Charsley	Goalkeeper	4	0	7	0	11	0
George Hollis	Goalkeeper	17	0	0	0	17	0
Charlie Simms	Goalkeeper	1	0	0	0	1	0
Tom Bayley	Full back	20	0	4	0	24	0
Fred Speller	Full back	22	0	7	0	29	0
Bill Taylor	Full back	6	0	4	1	10	1
Ted Devey	Half back	22	1	7	0	29	1
Caesar Jenkyns	Half back	20	2	7	0	27	2
W. Kendrick	Half back	1	0	0	0	1	0
Billy Ollis	Half back	22	0	7	0	29	0
Fred Allen	Forward	3	0	0	0	3	0
Walter Brown	Forward	3	2	0	0	3	2
Edward Burton	Forward	1	0	0	0	1	0
Len Curryer	Forward	2	0	0	0	2	0
Jack Hallam	Forward	22	10	7	3	29	13
Tommy Hands	Forward	19	4	6	3	25	7
Wilbert Harrison	Forward	1	2	0	0	1	2
Arthur Millard	Forward	3	1	1	2	4	3
Harry Morris	Forward	9	1	6	0	15	1
Billy Pratt	Forward	1	0	0	0	1	0
George Short	Forward	1	0	0	0	1	0
Billy Walton	Forward	15	6	6	4	21	10
Fred Wheldon	Forward	22	21	7	8	29	29
Frederick Wilkes	Forward	4	1	1	3	5	4

== See also ==
- Birmingham City F.C. seasons
