= Charsley =

Charsley is a surname. Notable people with the surname include:

- Chris Charsley (1864–1945), English footballer
- Harry Charsley (born 1996), English-born Irish professional footballer
- Walter Charsley (1869–1948), English footballer born in Stafford
- William Henry Charsley (1820–1900), English academic, Master of Charsley's Hall, Oxford from 1862 to 1891

== See also ==
- Charsley Hall or Charsley's Hall, private hall of the University of Oxford
- Carsley (disambiguation)
- Charley (disambiguation)
- Chearsley
