= Liverpool Senior Cup =

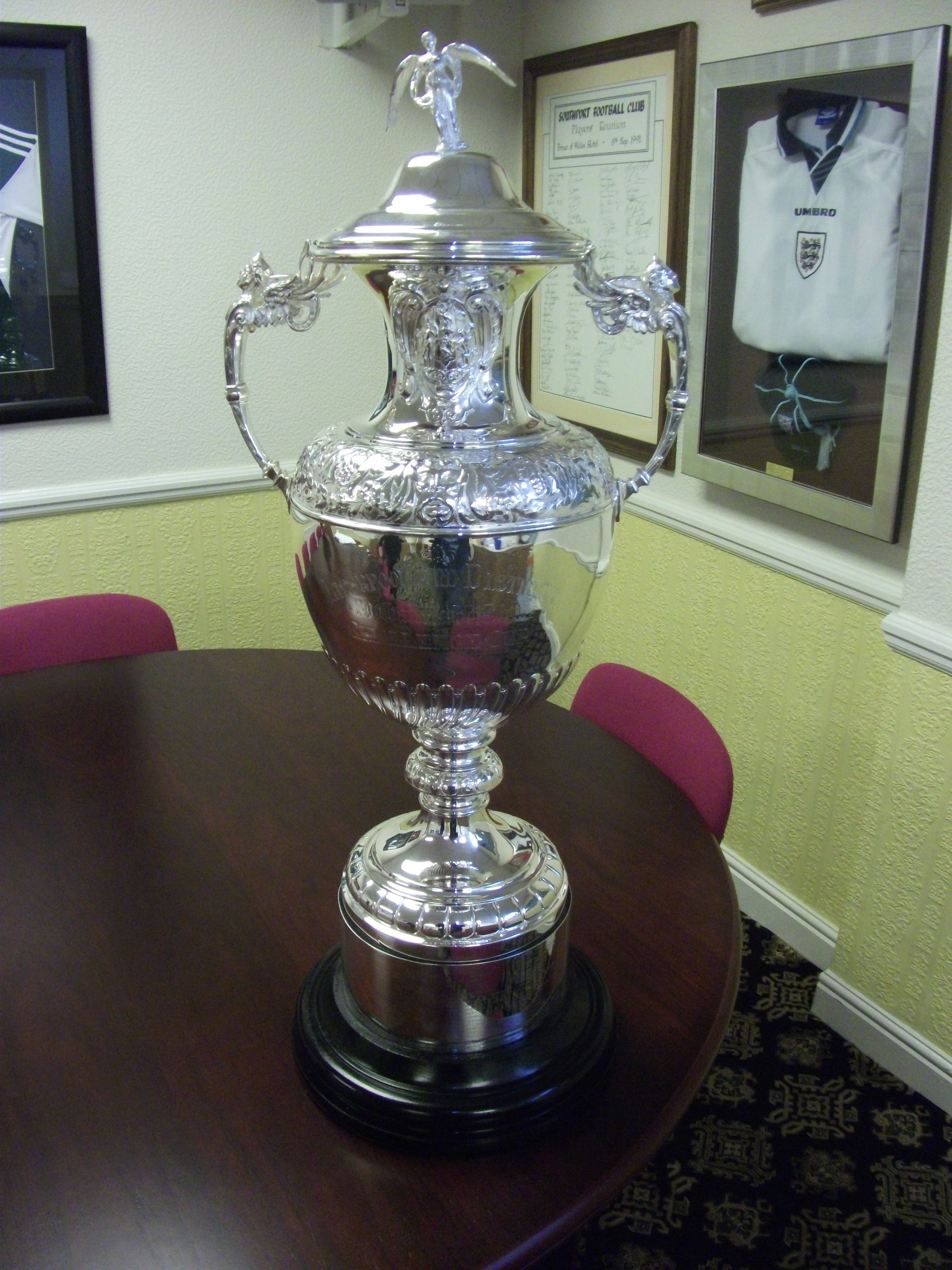
- Liverpool Senior Cup
- Organiser(s): Liverpool County FA
- Founded: 1882; 144 years ago
- Region: Merseyside
- Current champions: Everton (47th title)
- Most championships: Everton (47 titles)
- Website: Liverpool Senior Cup

The Liverpool County Football Association Senior Cup, commonly known as the Liverpool Senior Cup, is a football knockout tournament involving teams from the city of Liverpool, England and surrounding areas.

It is the County Cup competition of the Liverpool County Football Association and involves non-league clubs as well as the three professional teams in Merseyside: Everton, Liverpool and Tranmere Rovers.

== Competition history ==
The first Liverpool Senior Cup was played for in 1882–83, with Bootle (1879) becoming the inaugural winners, and the competition has taken place most seasons since then.

The Cup was suspended during most of the First World War, but continued during the Second World War, largely in the form of exhibition matches between Liverpool and Everton wartime teams.

Prescot Cables defeated Southport 2–0 in the 2016–17 final at Volair Park, with Andy Scarisbrick scoring the winner in the second half. The game received widespread attention from national news outlets when fans celebrating Joe Herbert's opening goal caused a section of the fence to collapse.

== Past winners ==
This section lists every final of the competition played since 1892, the winners, the runners-up, and the result.

=== Key ===
Match went to a replay
Match went to extra time
Match decided by a penalty shootout after extra time
Shared trophy

Season	Winners	Result	Runner-up	Venue	Notes
1882–83	Bootle (1879) (1)	3–1	Liverpool Ramblers	Liverpool College Ground	
1883–84	Everton (1)	1–0	Earlestown	Hawthorne Road	
1884–85	Earlestown	1–0	Everton	Hawthorne Road	
1885–86	Everton (2)	1–0	Bootle (1879)	Walton Stiles	
1886–87	Everton (3)	5–0	Oakfield Rovers	Hawthorne Road	
1887–88	Bootle (1879) (2)	3–0	Liverpool Stanley	Athletic Ground	
1888–89	Bootle (1879) (3)	5–3	Earlestown	Walton Stiles	
1889–90	Everton (4)	4–0	Bootle (1879)	Hawthorne Road	
1890–91	Everton (5)	4–1	Bootle (1879)	Hawthorne Road	
1891–92	Everton (6)	2–1	Southport Central	Hawthorne Road	
1892–93	Liverpool (1)	1–0	Everton	Hawthorne Road	
1893–94	Everton (7)	4–0	Liverpool	Police Athletic Ground	
1894–95	Everton (8)	3–0	Liverpool	Goodison Park	
1895–96	Everton (9)	4–0	Chester	Goodison Park	
1896–97	Rock Ferry	2–1	Everton	Goodison Park	
1897–98	Everton (10)	3–0	New Brighton Tower	Goodison Park	
1898–99	Everton (11)	8–1	New Brighton Tower	Goodison Park	
1899–00	Everton (12)	2–0	New Brighton Tower	Tower Grounds	Replay. 0–0 at Goodison Park.
1900–01	Liverpool (2)	1–0	Everton	Anfield	
1901–02	Liverpool (3)	1–0	Skelmersdale	Goodison Park	
1902–03	Liverpool (4)	2–0	Everton	Goodison Park	
1903–04	Everton (13)	3–2	Liverpool	Goodison Park	
1904–05	Liverpool (5)	4–1	Everton	Anfield	
1905–06	Liverpool (6)	2–0	Everton	Goodison Park	
1906–07	Liverpool (7)	3–0	Everton	Anfield	
1907–08	Everton (14)	2–0	Liverpool	Goodison Park	
1908–09	Liverpool (8)	2–1	Everton	Anfield	
1909–10	Liverpool (9); Everton (15)	1–1		Anfield	After extra-time. Trophy shared. 1–1 at Goodison Park.
1910–11	Everton (16)	2–0	Liverpool	Anfield	
1911–12	Everton (17); Liverpool (10)	0–0		Goodison Park	Trophy shared.
1912–13	Liverpool (11)	3–1	Everton	Anfield	
1913–14	Everton (18)	7–2	South Liverpool (Old)	Goodison Park	
1914–15	Liverpool (12)	1–0	Tranmere Rovers	Anfield	Replay. 1–1 at Goodison Park.
1915–18	Competition not held due to World War I.				
1918–19	Everton (19)	2–0	Liverpool	Goodison Park	
1919–20	Liverpool (13)	2–0	South Liverpool (Old)	Anfield	
1920–21	Everton (20)	2–1	Tranmere Rovers	Anfield	
1921–22	Everton (21)	1–0	Tranmere Rovers	Anfield	
1922–23	Everton (22)	4–2	Tranmere Rovers	Anfield	
1923–24	Everton (23)	2–1	Tranmere Rovers	Anfield	
1924–25	Liverpool (14)	1–0	Everton	Anfield	
1925–26	Everton (24)	1–0	New Brighton	Anfield	
1926–27	Liverpool (15)				
1927–28	Everton (25)	3–2	Tranmere Rovers	Anfield	
1928–29	Liverpool (16)		Tranmere Rovers		
1929–30	Liverpool (17)	1–0	Everton	Anfield	
1930–31	Southport (1)		Tranmere Rovers		
1931–32	Southport (2)				
1932–33	New Brighton (1)		Southport		
1933–34	Everton (26); Liverpool (18)	–			Trophy shared.
1934–35	New Brighton (2)		Tranmere Rovers		
1935–36	Liverpool (19); Everton (27)	1–1		Goodison Park	Replay. Trophy shared. 1–1 at Anfield.
1936–37	Liverpool (20)				
1937–38	Everton (28)	3–2	Tranmere Rovers	Anfield	
1938–39	Liverpool (21)	3–0	Tranmere Rovers	Anfield	
1939–40	Everton (29)	6–3	Liverpool	Anfield	
1940–41	Liverpool (22)	4–1	Everton	Anfield	
1941–42	Competition not held due to World War II.				
1942–43	Liverpool (23)	6–4	Everton	Goodison Park	1st: 4–1, 2nd: 2–3, Agg: 6–4. 1st leg at Anfield.
1943–44	Southport (3)	2–1	Everton	Goodison Park	1st: 1–1, 2nd: 1–0, Agg: 2–1. 1st leg at Haig Avenue.
1944–45	Everton (30)	7–1	Tranmere Rovers	Goodison Park	1st: 3–0, 2nd: 4–1, Agg: 7–1. 1st leg at Prenton Park.
1945–46	Liverpool (24)	3–1	Everton	Goodison Park	
1946–47	Liverpool (25)	2–1	Everton	Anfield	
1947–48	Liverpool (26)	2–0	Everton	Goodison Park	
1948–49	Tranmere Rovers (1)		New Brighton		
1949–50	Tranmere Rovers (2)		New Brighton		
1950–51	Tranmere Rovers (3)				
1951–52	Liverpool (27)	1–0	Everton	Goodison Park	
1952–53	Everton (31)	4–1	Tranmere Rovers	Goodison Park	
1953–54	Everton (32)	2–0	Liverpool	Goodison Park	
1954–55	Tranmere Rovers (4)				
1955–56	Everton (33)	2–1	Tranmere Rovers	Goodison Park	
1956–57	Everton (34)	2–1	Southport	Anfield	
1957–58	Everton (35); Southport (4)	0–0		Anfield	Trophy shared.
1958–59	Everton (36)	8–5	Tranmere Rovers	Anfield	
1959–60	Everton (37)	5–2	Tranmere Rovers	Goodison Park	
1960–61	Everton (38)	4–3	Liverpool	Goodison Park	
1961–62	Liverpool (28)				
1962–63	Southport (5)		Tranmere Rovers		Southport beat Tranmere Rovers in the semi-finals. The other semi-final between Everton and Liverpool could not be arranged due to fixture congestion, therefore, the cup was awarded to Southport.
1963–64	Liverpool (29); Southport (6)	–			Trophy shared.
1964–65	Competition not finished.				
1965–66	Competition not finished.				
1966–67	Competition not finished.				
1967–68	Liverpool (30)	4–1	Southport	Anfield	
1968–69	Competition not finished.				
1969–70	Tranmere Rovers (5)		Liverpool		
1970–71	Competition not finished.				
1971–72	Competition not finished.				
1972–73	Tranmere Rovers (6)				
1973–74	Tranmere Rovers (7)	3–1	Everton	Prenton Park	
1974–75	Southport (7)		Liverpool		
1975–76	Liverpool (31)				
1976–77	Liverpool (32)				
1977–78	Formby	1-0	Tranmere Rovers	Brows Lane	
1978–79	Marine (1)		Tranmere Rovers		
1979–80	Liverpool (33)				
1980–81	Liverpool (34)				
1981–82	Everton (39); Liverpool (35)	2–2		Goodison Park	After extra-time. Trophy shared.
1982–83	Everton (40)	1–0	South Liverpool	Goodison Park	
1983–84	Everton (41)	2–1	Tranmere Rovers	Prenton Park	
1984–85	Marine (2)	2-1	Formby		
1985–86	South Liverpool (1)				
1986–87	Kirkby Town		Liverpool		
1987–88	Marine (3)				
1988–89	South Liverpool (2)		Marine		
1989–90	Marine (4)				
1990–91	Southport (8)		Marine		
1991–92	Tranmere Rovers (8)				
1992–93	Southport (9)	2–1	Burscough		
1993–94	Marine (5)	2–1	Southport		
1994–95	Tranmere Rovers (9)	2–0	Marine		
1995–96	Everton (42)	2–1	Tranmere Rovers	Prenton Park	
1996–97	Liverpool (36)		Tranmere Rovers		
1997–98	Liverpool (37)				
1998–99	Southport (10)				
1999–00	Marine (6)				
2000–01	Burscough	1-0	Southport		
2001–02	Liverpool (38)	2–0	Everton	Walton Sports Centre	
2002–03	Everton (43)	2–1	Tranmere Rovers	Prenton Park	
2003–04	Liverpool (39)	1–1	Everton	Goodison Park	After extra-time. 9–8 on penalties.
2004–05	Everton (44)	1–0	Marine	Rossett Park	
2005–06	Final between Marine & Tranmere Rovers cancelled due to pitch availability problems.				
2006–07	Everton (45)	2–1	Tranmere Rovers	Prenton Park	
2007–08	Marine (7)	1–0	Liverpool		
2008–09	Liverpool (40)	1–0	Waterloo Dock		
2009–10	Liverpool (41)	3–2	Skelmersdale United		
2010–11	Southport (11)	2–0	Everton	Haig Avenue	
2011–12	Tranmere Rovers (10)	2–1	Everton	Prenton Park	
2012–13	Tranmere Rovers (11)	2–0	Bootle		
2013–14	Bootle	1–1	AFC Liverpool		After extra-time. 4–3 on penalties.
2014–15	Skelmersdale United	5–4	AFC Liverpool	The Community Ground	
2015–16	Everton (46)	3–0	Prescot Cables	Valerie Park	
2016–17	Prescot Cables (1)	2–0	Southport F.C.	Valerie Park	
2017–18	Prescot Cables (2)	4–0	Marine	Rossett Park	
2018–19	Prescot Cables (3)	0–0	Southport	Valerie Park	After extra-time. 3–4 on penalties.
2019–20	Competition abandoned due to COVID-19 pandemic.				
2020–22	Competition not held due to COVID-19 pandemic.				
2022–23	Marine (8)	0–0	Runcorn Linnets	Halton Stadium	After extra-time. 4–3 on penalties.
2023–24	Marine (9)	2–0	City of Liverpool	Rossett Park	
2024-25	Everton (47)	4–1	Lower Breck	Walton Hall Park	

=== Wins by teams ===
Club	Wins	Outright wins	First final won	Last final won	Notes
Everton	47	41	1883–84	2024-25	6 titles shared (Liverpool: 5 & Southport: 1).
Liverpool	41	35	1892–93	2009–10	6 titles shared (Everton: 5 & Southport: 1).
Southport	11	9	1930–31	2018–19	2 titles shared (Everton: 1 & Liverpool: 1).
Tranmere Rovers	11	11	1948–49	2012–13	
Marine	9	9	1978–79	2023–24	
Bootle (1879) †	3	3	1882–83	1888–89	Dissolved in 1893.
Prescot Cables	2	2	2016–17	2017-18	
New Brighton †	2	2	1932–33	1934–35	Dissolved in 1983 & 2012.
South Liverpool	2	2	1985–86	1988–89	
Bootle	1	1	2012–13	2012–13	
Burscough	1	1	2000–01	2000–01	
Formby	1	1	1977–78	1977–78	
Earlestown (1880) †	1	1	1884–85	1884–85	Dissolved in 1911.
Kirkby Town †	1	1	1986–87	1986–87	Dissolved in 1997.
Rock Ferry	1	1	1896–97	1896–97	
Skelmersdale	1	1	2014–15	2014–15	

== Recent finals ==
28 April 2014	Tranmere Rovers	2–0	Bootle	Birkenhead
19:45 BST		Report		Stadium: Prenton Park; Attendance: 438

18 April 2015	Skelmersdale United	5–4	AFC Liverpool	Burscough
19:45 BST	Scott Bakkor 1', 27'; Aidan Kirkbride 5'; Danny Mitchley 17'; Valter Fernandes 62'	Report	Ryan Cox 2'; Steven Jones 14'; Francis Barry 39'; Josh Purcell 89'	Stadium: The Community Ground; Attendance: 335

4 April 2016	Prescot Cables	0–3	Everton F.C	Prescot
19:45 BST		Report	Ledson; Duffus; Rodríguez	Stadium: Valerie Park

25 April 2017	Prescot Cables	2–0	Southport	Prescot
	Joe Herbert; Andy Scarisbrick	Report		Stadium: Valerie Park; Attendance: 905

26 April 2018	Marine	0–4	Prescot Cables	Crosby
		Report	Chris Almond (pen.); Lloyd Dean; Josh Klein-Davies	Stadium: Marine Travel Arena; Attendance: 750

18 April 2023	Marine	0–0 (a.e.t.) (4–3 p)	Runcorn Linnets	Widnes
19:45 BST		Report		Stadium: DCBL Stadium; Attendance: 2,561
	Penalties
	Lussey (penalty scored); Howarth (penalty scored); Britton (penalty missed); Weir (penalty scored); Joe Bunney (penalty scored)		Brooke (penalty missed); Heathcote (penalty scored); Moore (penalty scored); Short (penalty missed); O'Mahoney (penalty scored)

23 April 2024	Marine	2–0	City of Liverpool	Crosby
19:45 BST	Sinclair-Smith 7', Solomon 80'	Report		Stadium: Rossett Park; Attendance: 1,898

6 May 2025	Everton	4–1	Lower Breck	Walton
		Report		Stadium: Walton Hall Park; Attendance: 600

== Liverpool Non-League Senior Cup ==
After the Second World War, a separate competition was created for local non-League clubs; the Liverpool Non-League Senior Cup. The competition was scrapped in 1977, and non-League teams now enter the Liverpool Senior Cup instead.

Season	Winners	Result	Runner-up	Venue	Notes
1949–50	Bootle Athletic	2–1 (1st leg); 2–0 (2nd leg)	South Liverpool	Bootle Stadium, Bootle; Holly Park, Garston	
1950–51	Bootle Athletic	2–1	South Liverpool	Anfield, Liverpool	
1951–52	Prescot Cables	4–3	Skelmersdale United	Haig Avenue, Southport	
1952–53	Prescot Cables	2–1	Bootle Athletic	Anfield, Liverpool	
1953–54	South Liverpool	1–0	Burscough	Anfield, Liverpool	
1954–55	Wigan Athletic	3–3 (1st leg); 3–2 (2nd leg)	South Liverpool	Holly Park, Garston; Springfield Park, Wigan	
1955–56	Burscough	1–0	New Brighton	Goodison Park, Liverpool	
1956–57	New Brighton		Prescot Cables	Anfield, Liverpool	
1957–58	Wigan Athletic; New Brighton	3–3; 1–1 (Replay, 1st leg); 0–0 (Replay, 2nd leg)		Anfield, Liverpool; Springfield Park, Wigan; Tower Athletic Ground, New Brighton	(Note: Trophy shared)
1958–59	Prescot Cables	3–1	Skelmersdale United	Anfield, Liverpool	
1959–60	New Brighton	2–0	Wigan Athletic	Anfield, Liverpool	
1960–61	Prescot Cables	0–0 (1st leg); 2–0 (2nd leg)	South Liverpool	Holly Park, Garston; Hope Street, Prescot	
1961–62	New Brighton	2–0	Wigan Athletic	Anfield, Liverpool	
1962–63	Wigan Athletic	1–0	South Liverpool	Springfield Park, Wigan	
1963–64	New Brighton	1–0	South Liverpool	Tower Athletic Ground, New Brighton	
1964–65	Wigan Athletic	3–0 (1st leg); 3–3 (2nd leg)	New Brighton	Tower Athletic Ground, New Brighton; Springfield Park, Wigan	
1965–66	Wigan Athletic	2–0 (a.e.t.)	South Liverpool	Haig Avenue, Southport	
1966–67	Wigan Athletic	2–0	Skelmersdale United	White Moss Park, Skelmersdale	
1967–68	South Liverpool	2–1 (a.e.t.)	Guinness Exports	White Moss Park, Skelmersdale	
1968–69	Marine	1–0	Guinness Exports	White Moss Park, Skelmersdale	
1969–70	South Liverpool	3–1	Marine	Rossett Park, Crosby	
1970–71	Ormskirk	1–0	Skelmersdale United	White Moss Park, Skelmersdale	
1971–72	Burscough	4–1	Formby	Victoria Park, Burscough	
1972–73	Ormskirk	1–0	Marine	Rossett Park, Crosby	
1973–74	Skelmersdale United	2–1	Burscough	Victoria Park, Burscough	
1974–75	Skelmersdale United	1–0	New Brighton	Victoria Park, Burscough	
1975–76	Marine	3–0	Skelmersdale United	Rossett Park, Crosby	
1976–77	Marine	3–2	St Helens Town	Rossett Park, Crosby	

== See also ==
- Lancashire Senior Cup
