= Edward Burton =

Edward Burton may refer to:

- Edward Burton (footballer) (1869–?), English footballer
- Edward Burton (Jesuit) (1585–1623), English Jesuit
- Edward Burton (theologian) (1794–1836), English theologian, Regius Professor of Divinity at Oxford
- Edward Burton (zoologist) (1790–1867), British Army surgeon and zoologist
- Edward Burton (priest) (1737–1817), Anglican priest in Ireland
- Edward Burton (MP), Member of Parliament for Pembroke, Wales
- Ed Burton (1939–2012), American basketball player
- SS Edward Burton, a 1945 cargo ship

== See also ==
- Edward Burton Gleeson (1803–1870), Australian politician
- Edward Burton Hughes (1905–1987), American government official
