= James Wollaston =

English footballer

Personal information
- Date of birth: 1873
- Place of birth: Hall Green, Birmingham, England
- Date of death: December 1918 (aged 44–45)
- Place of death: King's Norton, Birmingham, England
- Position: Half back

Senior career*
Years	Team	Apps	(Gls)
- Yardley Victoria
1891	Small Heath	1	(0)
- Stechford Royal Unity
- * Club domestic league appearances and goals

James Wollaston (1873 – December 1918) was an English footballer who played in the Football Alliance for Small Heath. Wollaston was born in the Hall Green district of Birmingham and played local football before spending a few weeks with Small Heath at the end of the 1890–91 season. He played in three friendlies and once in the Football Alliance, standing in at right half for Harry Morris, though his preferred position was centre half. He died in Kings Norton, Birmingham, in 1918 aged about 45.
