= Ernie Watts (disambiguation) =

Ernie Watts (born 1945) is an American jazz and R&B saxophone player.

Ernie Watts may also refer to:

- Ernie Watts (Small Heath footballer), English association footballer who played for Small Heath (1889–1890)
- Ernie Watts (footballer, born 1872) (1872–?), English association footballer who played for a number of clubs
