= Arthur Turner (footballer, born 1867) =

English footballer

Personal information
- Full name: Arthur Samuel Turner
- Date of birth: 1867
- Place of birth: Birmingham, England
- Date of death: Unknown
- Position: Inside right

Senior career*
Years	Team	Apps	(Gls)
–	Aston Villa	0	(0)
1890–1891	Small Heath	1	(0)
- * Club domestic league appearances and goals

Arthur Samuel Turner (1867 – after 1890) was an English footballer who played in the Football Alliance for Small Heath. Born in Birmingham, Turner joined Small Heath after he was released by Aston Villa without playing for their first team. An inside right, he played one game in Small Heath's second season in the Football Alliance, deputising for Charlie Short in a 4–3 defeat at home to Darwen in November 1890. He was not retained at the end of the 1890–91 season.
