= Walter Ward (footballer) =

English footballer

Personal information
- Full name: Walter Ward
- Date of birth: 1869
- Place of birth: Birmingham, England
- Date of death: Unknown
- Position: Goalkeeper

Senior career*
Years	Team	Apps	(Gls)
1890–1891	Small Heath	5	(0)
- * Club domestic league appearances and goals

Walter Ward (1869 – after 1890) was an English professional footballer born in Birmingham who played in the Football Alliance for Small Heath. During the 1890–91 season, Ward deputised for regular goalkeeper Chris Charsley when Charsley's duties as a serving police officer demanded his absence from the side.
