= Thomas Davenport =

Thomas or Tom Davenport may refer to:

- Thomas Davenport (inventor) (1802–1851), blacksmith from Vermont, USA, inventor of the electric motor
- Thomas Davenport (congressman) (died 1838), U.S. representative from Virginia
- Thomas Davenport (footballer) (1860–?), English footballer active in the 1880s
- Thomas H. Davenport (born 1954), known as Tom, American academic
- Sir Thomas Davenport (MP), British Member of Parliament for Newton, 1780–1786
- Tom Davenport (filmmaker) (born 1939), American filmmaker
