= Francis Banks =

English footballer

Personal information
- Date of birth: February 1865
- Place of birth: Aston, England
- Date of death: Unknown
- Place of death: Birmingham, England
- Position: Goalkeeper

Senior career*
Years	Team	Apps	(Gls)
- All Saints
1889–1890	Small Heath	4	(0)
1890–1???	Warwick County		
- * Club domestic league appearances and goals

Francis Banks (February 1865 – after 1890) was an English professional footballer who played in the Football Alliance for Small Heath. Banks was born in Aston, now part of Birmingham, and joined Small Heath as a backup to goalkeeper Chris Charsley in 1889. In his first competitive game he conceded nine goals away at Sheffield Wednesday, and in his remaining three games, at the end of the 1889–90 season, he let in a total of nineteen. He then joined Warwick County of the Midland League.
