= Tom McKnight =

English footballer

Personal information
- Full name: Thomas McKnight
- Date of birth: April 1868
- Place of birth: Lichfield, England
- Date of death: 1930 (aged 61–62)
- Position: Forward

Senior career*
Years	Team	Apps	(Gls)
1890–1891	Aston Villa	10	(1)
- * Club domestic league appearances and goals

Thomas McKnight (April 1868 – 1930) was an English soccer-player who played in the Association-Football-League for Aston Villa.

As a new signing for Villa, McKnight played in the benefit match held for Small Heath player, Chris Charsley, ahead of his retirement; despite the admission charge being increased for the occasion, around 6,000 spectators turned up to watch a schoolboys' match followed by the main attraction. In an encounter described by the Birmingham Daily Post as "perhaps the closest and most exciting ever played on the field", Villa drew 2–2 with a Small Heath eleven. A substantial sum was raised.
