= Frederick Wilkes =

English footballer

Personal information
- Full name: Frederick Wilkes
- Date of birth: 1869
- Place of birth: Birmingham, England
- Date of death: Unknown
- Position: Forward

Youth career
- Handsworth Boys Club

Senior career*
Years	Team	Apps	(Gls)
1891–1892	Small Heath	4	(1)
- Brownhills
- * Club domestic league appearances and goals

Frederick Wilkes (1869 – after 1892) was an English professional footballer who played in the Football Alliance for Small Heath.

Wilkes was born in the Handsworth district of Birmingham and began his football career with Handsworth Boys Club. He signed for Small Heath in April 1891, and played in a few friendly matches at the end of that season. With Harry Morris struggling for fitness towards the end of his career, Wilkes was one of six players tried at centre forward during the 1891–92 Football Alliance season. He scored a hat-trick in the Fourth Qualifying Round of the FA Cup against Brierley Hill Alliance. At the end of the season he moved into non-league football with Brownhills.
