= Albert Evers =

English footballer

Personal information
- Full name: Albert Evers
- Date of birth: 1868
- Place of birth: Birmingham, England
- Date of death: Unknown
- Place of death: Birmingham, England
- Position: Half back

Senior career*
Years	Team	Apps	(Gls)
–	Springfield Tavern		
–	Royal Oak Rangers		
1891	Small Heath	2	(0)
1891–1???	Yardley Victoria		
- * Club domestic league appearances and goals

Albert Evers (1868 – after 1890) was an English footballer who played in the Football Alliance for Small Heath. Born in Birmingham, Evers moved up from junior football to provide cover for Small Heath's half-back line. He played twice towards the end of the 1890–91 Football Alliance season, deputising for Caesar Jenkyns and Harry Morris respectively, then returned to local football later that year. Evers died in his native Birmingham.
