= Arthur Millard =

English footballer (born 1869)

Personal information
- Full name: Arthur Arnold Millard
- Date of birth: 1869
- Place of birth: Birmingham, England
- Date of death: Unknown
- Position: Forward

Senior career*
Years	Team	Apps	(Gls)
- Smethwick Centaur
1891–1892	Small Heath	3	(1)
- Lea Hall
- * Club domestic league appearances and goals

Arthur Arnold Millard (1869 – after 1891) was an English professional footballer born in Birmingham who played in the Football Alliance for Small Heath. Millard had a good goalscoring record before joining Small Heath. In his three games in the Football Alliance and one in the FA Cup Millard scored three goals, but he returned to local football at the end of the 1891–92 season.
