= Len Curryer =

English footballer

Personal information
- Full name: Leonard Curryer
- Date of birth: 1864
- Place of birth: Birmingham, England
- Date of death: Unknown
- Place of death: Birmingham, England
- Position: Forward

Senior career*
Years	Team	Apps	(Gls)
1891–1892	Small Heath	2	(0)
- * Club domestic league appearances and goals

Leonard Curryer (1864 – after 1891) was an English footballer who played as a forward for Small Heath. Curryer, a native of Birmingham who also died there, played twice in the Football Alliance in the 1891–91 season, standing in for the injured Harry Morris.
