= Bill Taylor (footballer, born 1869) =

English footballer

Personal information
- Full name: William Taylor
- Date of birth: 1869
- Place of birth: Smethwick, England
- Date of death: Unknown
- Position: Utility player

Senior career*
Years	Team	Apps	(Gls)
- Langley Green Victoria
1891–1892	Small Heath	6	(0)
1892–1???	Quinton		
- * Club domestic league appearances and goals

William Taylor (1869 – after 1891) was an English professional footballer who made six appearances in the Football Alliance for Small Heath.

Taylor was born in Smethwick, which was then in Staffordshire. He played for Langley Green Victoria before joining Small Heath in 1891 on the recommendation of Fred Wheldon. He played six games in the Football Alliance and four in the FA Cup, scoring one goal, but the club were unable to find a playing position which suited both Taylor and the team, and he left for Quinton at the end of the 1891–92 season.
