= Archibald Barton =

English footballer

Personal information
- Full name: Archibald Barton
- Date of birth: 1862
- Place of birth: Moseley, Birmingham, England
- Date of death: Unknown
- Place of death: Birmingham, England
- Position: Full back

Senior career*
Years	Team	Apps	(Gls)
–	Coles Farm Unity		
1889–1890	Small Heath	1	(0)
–	Kings Heath Comrades		
- * Club domestic league appearances and goals

Archibald Barton (1862 – after 1889) was an English professional footballer who played in the Football Alliance for Small Heath. Barton was born in the Moseley district of Birmingham and played local football for Coles Farm Unity before joining Small Heath. He played competitively only once for the club, in the opening game of the 1889–90 season, deputising at right-back when Fred Speller was switched to the left in the absence of Walter Gittins. Barton died in Birmingham.
