= Walter Brown (footballer, born 1867) =

British footballer

Personal information
- Full name: Walter Ephraim Brown
- Date of birth: 1867
- Place of birth: Birmingham, England
- Date of death: Unknown
- Position: Forward

Senior career*
Years	Team	Apps	(Gls)
- Soho Villa
- Grove Hill
- Hockley Belmont
- St James's
1891	Small Heath	3	(2)
1891–????	Crosswell's Brewery		
- * Club domestic league appearances and goals

Walter Ephraim Brown (1867 – after 1890) was an English footballer who played in the Football Alliance for Small Heath. Brown was born in the Handsworth district of Birmingham and played football for several local clubs before spending a couple of months with Small Heath. He played in three of the first four games of the 1891–92 Football Alliance season, once on the left wing and twice at inside left, scoring in each of the latter two, before returning to local football with Crosswell's Brewery.
