= Carsley =

Carsley may refer to:

== People with the surname ==
- George H. Carsley (1870-1933), American architect
- Lee Carsley (1974), English football player

== Location ==
- Carsley, Virginia, U.S.

== Fictional location ==
- Agatha Raisin (TV series)#Pilot (2014)
