= Edward Burton (Jesuit) =

Edward Catcher (alias Burton, c. 1585–1623), was an English Jesuit, from London.

== Biography ==
Catcher (alias Burton) was the son of Edward Catcher of London, was born in 1584 or 1586, and studied at Balliol College, Oxford, where he obtained a B.A. He was reconciled to the Catholic Church in 1606, entered the English College at Rome the same year. He completed his studies at the English College, Valladolid and joined the Society of Jesus at Louvain in 1609 or 1611. He was procurator of the order at Liège 1621–1623, and died on the English mission about 1624.

== Works ==
Catcher translated into English Father François Véron's sermons preached before the Duke de Longueville, and his Defeat of Henshe, the Calvinistic Minister, printed at Douai 1616.
