= James Lundie (footballer) =

Scottish footballer

Personal information
- Date of birth: 20 April 1857
- Place of birth: Edinburgh, Scotland
- Date of death: 16 August 1942 (aged 85)
- Place of death: Grimsby, England
- Position: Right back

Senior career*
Years	Team	Apps	(Gls)
- Lugar Boswell Thistle
1883–1887	Hibernian		
1887–1895	Grimsby Town	106	(0)

International career
1886	Scotland	1	(0)
- * Club domestic league appearances and goals

James Lundie (20 April 1857 – 16 August 1942) was a Scottish footballer who played as a right back.

== Career ==
Born in Edinburgh, Lundie played club football for Lugar Boswell Thistle, Hibernian and Grimsby Town, and made one appearance for Scotland in 1886. He won the Scottish Cup with Hibernian in 1887, having become the club's joint-first Scotland international representative (alongside James McGhee) a year earlier.

Lundie played for Grimsby a total of six seasons, making 106 league appearances. He was club captain in 1890–91 and between 1892–93 and 1893–94 seasons.

== Later life ==
After retiring from playing he settled in Grimsby, dying there in 1942.
