= Dick Wilcock =

Welsh footballer

Personal information
- Full name: Albert Richard Wilcock
- Date of birth: 31 October 1867
- Place of birth: Oswestry, Shropshire, England
- Date of death: 1 July 1932 (aged 64)
- Place of death: Manchester, England
- Height: 5 ft 4 in (1.63 m)
- Position: Forward

Senior career*
Years	Team	Apps	(Gls)
- Oswestry Orleston
1887 - 1891	Oswestry Town		
1890	→ Small Heath (Trialist)	4	(2)
1893	Oswestry United		
Total		4	(1)

International career
1890	Wales	1	(1)
- * Club domestic league appearances and goals

Albert Richard Wilcock (born 31 October 1867), commonly known as Dick Wilcock was a Welsh international footballer. He was part of the Wales national football team, playing 1 match and scoring 1 goal on 8 February 1890 against Ireland.

His only cap was said to have been achieved through the influence of Oswestry secretary and former Wales goalkeeper Tom Gough, which led to a trial with Small Heath, which he made 4 appearances between February and April 1890, scoring 2 goals in the Football Alliance. He made his international debut alongside Caesar Jenkyns and John Hallam and showed neat close-passing skills. Although he scored on his international debut with an excellent goal, it was clearly not enough as he did not convince the selectors that he had justified his retention. With the demise of the town club in November 1891, Wilcock became less active on the soccer front but when the new Oswestry United club was formed in 1893, he was soon among the line up.

Wilcock emigrated to Canada in 1906 to take a job with the Canadian Pacific Railway. On 3 June 1915 he joined the 61st Battalion (Winnipeg), CEF, knocking ten years off his real age on his attestation papers, to become a member of one of the first Canadian contingents to arrive in Europe. Wilcock fought at Ypres and was severely wounded.

He returned to Canada after the war and eventually settled in Manchester, Lancashire where he worked as a storekeeper at an engineering works.

Wilcock died in Manchester, aged 64.

== See also ==
- List of Wales international footballers (alphabetical)
