= Edward Clarke (footballer) =

English footballer

Personal information
- Full name: Edward Clarke
- Date of birth: 1871
- Place of birth: Stechford, Birmingham, England
- Date of death: Unknown
- Place of death: Birmingham, England
- Position: Left back

Senior career*
Years	Team	Apps	(Gls)
1889–1890	Small Heath	1	(0)
- * Club domestic league appearances and goals

Edward Clarke (1871 – after 1890) was an English footballer who played in the Football Alliance for Small Heath. He was born in the Stechford district of Birmingham and attended Washwood Heath School. He played once for Small Heath in the inaugural season of the Football Alliance, deputising at left back for the injured Fred Speller.
