= Wilton Lines =

English footballer (fl. 1889–1890)

Personal information
- Full name: Wilton Lines
- Place of birth: Birmingham, England
- Position: Forward

Senior career*
Years	Team	Apps	(Gls)
1889–1890	Small Heath	7	(1)
- * Club domestic league appearances and goals

Wilton Lines (fl. 1889–1890) was an English professional footballer born in Birmingham. Lines played seven games for Small Heath in the inaugural 1889–90 season of the Football Alliance, covering a variety of forward positions, but was unable to displace the established forwards.
