= Edward Burton (footballer) =

English footballer

Personal information
- Date of birth: 1869
- Place of birth: Birmingham, England
- Date of death: Unknown
- Place of death: Birmingham, England
- Position: Centre forward

Senior career*
Years	Team	Apps	(Gls)
- Highfield Villa
1891–1892	Small Heath	1	(0)
1892–1???	Springfield Villa		
- * Club domestic league appearances and goals

Edward G. Burton (1869 – after 1891) was an English professional footballer who played in the Football Alliance for Small Heath. Born in the Acocks Green district of Birmingham, he played for Highfield Villa before joining Small Heath. A centre forward, he played only once for the club, deputising for the injured Harry Morris, and soon returned to local football. Burton died in Birmingham.
