= Hawthorne Road =

Cricket and football ground in England

- Interactive map of Hawthorne Road
- Location: Bootle, England
- Coordinates: 53.4438°N 2.9844°W
- Surface: Grass
- Record attendance: 20,000

Tenants
- Bootle F.C. (1884–1893); Bootle Athletic

Hawthorne Road was a cricket and football ground in Bootle in England. It was the home ground of Bootle F.C. between 1884 and 1893.

== History ==
Hawthorne Road was originally a cricket ground, but began to be used for football in 1884 when Bootle F.C. moved to the site. At the time the only spectator facility was a cricket pavilion on the east side of the ground, with football being played at the southern end of the site. In 1889 the football club opened a seated stand behind the western goal and a covered stand flanked by two open terraces on the southern touchline. The ground's record attendance was set on 26 December 1889 when 20,000 saw Bootle play Everton in a friendly match.

Bootle joined the Football Alliance in 1889, and in 1892 were elected into the Second Division of the Football League. The first League match played at the ground on 10 September 1892 saw Bootle beat Sheffield United 2–0 in front of 4,000 spectators. However, crowds rapidly dwindled, and dropped below 1,000 by December. Although Bootle finishing eighth in the Second Division, financial constraints forced them to resign from the league, with Liverpool elected to replace them. The last Football League match was played at Hawthorne Road on 15 April 1893, with 2,000 watching Bootle beat Lincoln City 4–1.

The ground remained open for cricket, and was briefly home to Bootle Athletic. However, housing was later built over the part of the site where the football ground was located when Wadham Road was extended.
