= Jack Hughes (footballer, born 1866) =

English footballer

Personal information
- Date of birth: 1866
- Place of birth: Birmingham, England
- Date of death: Unknown
- Position: Centre half

Senior career*
Years	Team	Apps	(Gls)
- Birmingham Unity
1890–1891	Small Heath	1	(0)
1891–1???	Lea Hall Constitutionals		
- * Club domestic league appearances and goals

Jack Hughes (1866 – after 1890) was an English professional footballer who played in the Football Alliance for Small Heath. Born in Birmingham, Hughes played football for Birmingham Unity before joining Small Heath in August 1890. He played only once in the Football Alliance, in the opening game of the 1890–91 season, deputising at centre half for Caesar Jenkyns; Small Heath lost 5–2 away to Walsall Town Swifts.
