= Eddy Stanley =

English footballer

Alfred Stanley (1860 – c. 1930), known as Eddy Stanley, was an English footballer who played as a forward for Small Heath Alliance (now Birmingham City) from 1881 until his career was ended by injury ten years later.

Born in Edgbaston, Birmingham, Stanley was a fine dribbler of the ball and could play in any forward position, though preferred inside-right. When the club beat Walsall Swifts 4–1 to win their first ever trophy, the Walsall Cup, in 1882–83, Stanley scored two and created another of the goals. He also scored the first hat-trick for the club in national competitive football, netting four in a 9–2 FA Cup win against Burton Wanderers in 1885. Over his career he appeared in 22 FA Cup ties, scoring 14 goals, and made 13 appearances in Small Heath's first season in the Football Alliance, scoring 5 goals. Injury prevented him playing on after the end of that 1889–90 season and forced his retirement in 1891. He died in Birmingham aged about 70.
