= Bootle Athletic F.C. =

Bootle Athletic
- Full name: Bootle Athletic Football Club
- Founded: 1948
- Dissolved: 1953
- Ground: Hawthorne Road, Bootle
- 1953–54: Lancashire Combination (withdrew)

Bootle Athletic Football Club was an association football club from Bootle, Lancashire, England. Formed in 1948 they competed in the Lancashire Combination, winning the Second Division and from then on competing in the First Division, until their demise in 1953, when they resigned from the league and folded.

They played their games at Hawthorne Road, previously the home of the professional Bootle, briefly members of the Football League from 1892 to 1893. They moved to Bootle Stadium in 1950 until their demise in 1953.
