= Charlie Simms =

English footballer

Personal information
- Date of birth: 12 February 1859
- Place of birth: Birmingham, England
- Date of death: 20 July 1935 (aged 76)
- Place of death: Birmingham, England
- Positions: Centre half; wing half

Senior career*
Years	Team	Apps	(Gls)
- Calthorpe
- Mitchell St George's
1884–1893	Small Heath	10	(0)
- * Club domestic league appearances and goals

Charles Simms (12 February 1859 – 20 July 1935) was an English professional footballer who made nine appearances in the Football Alliance and one in the Football League playing for Small Heath. He played as a centre half or wing half.

Simms was born in Birmingham in 1859. He played for Calthorpe and Mitchell St George's before joining Small Heath Alliance in 1884. His first FA Cup match for the club came in the same year, and in the 1885–86 season he played in all their games up to and including the semi-final, which Small Heath lost 4–0 to West Bromwich Albion. By the time Small Heath became involved in league football, in the Football Alliance in the 1889–90 season, injury problems meant he could play only rarely, though he continued until 1892–93, the inaugural season of the Football League Second Division. He made his only appearance in the Football League on 7 January 1893, in a 4–3 win at Lincoln City, as a late replacement for Caesar Jenkyns who had missed his train.

When he retired as a player Simms became the club's trainer, and when the new St Andrew's ground opened in 1906, he was appointed head groundsman, a post he held until January 1914, at which point he retired from football after 30 years' service to the club.

Simms died in Birmingham in 1935 at the age of 76.
