= Frederick Heath (footballer) =

English footballer

Personal information
- Full name: Frederick Sidney Heath
- Date of birth: 1865
- Place of birth: Smethwick, England
- Date of death: Unknown
- Position: Utility player

Senior career*
Years	Team	Apps	(Gls)
- Bearwood White Star
- Bearwood
- Cookham
1889–1891	Small Heath	23	(2)
1891	Stourbridge		
1891–1???	Hockley Rose		
- * Club domestic league appearances and goals

Frederick Sidney Heath (1865 – after 1890) was an English professional footballer who made 23 appearances in the Football Alliance playing for Small Heath. He played in attack or as a half back.

Heath was born in 1865 in Smethwick, which was then in Staffordshire. He began his football career with Bearwood White Star, Bearwood and Cookham before joining Small Heath in 1889 for a fee of £1. He made his debut on 7 September 1889, the opening day of the inaugural season of the Football Alliance, in a 3–2 home win against local rivals Birmingham St George's, playing at inside left. That season he played in all forward positions apart from inside right and at both left and right half, and the following year played a couple of games at centre half. He went on to play for Stourbridge and Hockley Rose.
