= Walter Charsley =

English footballer

Personal information
- Full name: Walter Augustine Charsley
- Date of birth: 28 August 1869
- Place of birth: Stafford, England
- Date of death: 1948 (aged 78)
- Place of death: Birmingham, England
- Position: Wing half

Senior career*
Years	Team	Apps	(Gls)
1890–1891	Small Heath	3	(0)
- * Club domestic league appearances and goals

Walter Augustine Charsley (28 August 1869 – 1948) was an English footballer born in Stafford. (Note: For convenience, the middle name, birthplace and birth year are sourced to a genealogy whose information is consistent with census and BMD data, which the corresponding information from Matthews is not.) The younger brother of Small Heath and England goalkeeper Chris Charsley, he played three times as a wing half for Small Heath in the Football Alliance in the 1890–91 season. He died in Small Heath, Birmingham.
