= Billy Pratt (footballer, born 1872) =

English footballer

Personal information
- Full name: William Pratt
- Date of birth: 1872
- Place of birth: Birmingham, England
- Date of death: Unknown
- Position: Outside forward

Senior career*
| Years | Team | Apps | (Gls) |
| –1889 | St John's (Deritend) | | |
| 1889–1892 | Small Heath | 22 | (1) |
| 1892–1898 | Small Heath Unity | | |
| 1898–1??? | Worcester Rovers | | |
- * Club domestic league appearances and goals

William Pratt (1872 – after 1898) was an English professional footballer who made 22 appearances in the Football Alliance playing for Small Heath.

Pratt, born in Highgate, Birmingham, joined Small Heath in 1889. A winger whose strengths were dribbling and crossing the ball but who lacked pace, he made his first-team debut on 19 October 1889, playing at inside left in a 2–2 draw away at The Wednesday in the Football Alliance. He became a first-team regular in the 1890–91 season, but lost his place to new arrival "Toddy" Hands in December 1890, played only twice more for the first team, and dropped back into local non-league football in 1892.

He is often confused with another Billy Pratt, a left back who did not join the club until 1894.
