= Ernie Watts (Small Heath footballer) =

English footballer

Personal information
- Full name: Ernest Watts
- Date of birth: (Note: Matthews gives birth year 1875, which is clearly a typographical error, possibly for 1865.)
- Place of birth: Birmingham, England
- Position: Inside right

Senior career*
Years	Team	Apps	(Gls)
1889–1890	Small Heath	2	(0)
- * Club domestic league appearances and goals

Ernest Watts (fl. 1889) was an English footballer born in Birmingham who played in the Football Alliance for Small Heath. After Small Heath's 9–1 defeat against The Wednesday in the inaugural season of the Football Alliance, Watts was given a couple of games at inside right at Christmas 1889, but he made no improvement to the side.
