= 1891–92 FA Cup =

Tournament details
- Country: England; Scotland; Wales

Final positions
- Champions: West Bromwich Albion (2nd title)
- Runners-up: Aston Villa

The 1891–92 FA Cup was the 21st staging of the world's oldest football cup competition, the Football Association Challenge Cup, commonly known as the FA Cup. West Bromwich Albion won the competition, beating Aston Villa 3–0 in the final at the Kennington Oval, with Wembley Stadium still 30 years away from being built.

Matches were scheduled to be played at the stadium of the team named first on the date specified for each round, which was always a Saturday. Some matches, however, might be rescheduled for other days if there were clashes with games for other competitions or the weather was inclement. If scores were level after 90 minutes had been played, a replay would take place at the stadium of the second-named team later the same week. If the replayed match was drawn further replays would be held until a winner was determined. If scores were level after 90 minutes had been played in a replay, a 30-minute period of extra time would be played.

== Calendar ==
Round	Date	No. of teams
First qualifying round	Saturday 3 October 1891	160
Second qualifying round	Saturday 24 October 1891	80
Third qualifying round	Saturday 14 November 1891	40
Fourth qualifying round	Saturday 5 December 1891	20
First round proper	Saturday 16 January 1892	32
Second round proper	Saturday 30 January 1892	16
Third round proper	Saturday 13 February 1892	8
Semifinals	Saturday 27 February 1892	4
Final	Saturday 19 March 1892	2

== Qualifying rounds ==
Despite the Football League expanding from 12 teams to 14, this season's FA Cup qualifying rounds were still played out to a fourth round consisting of 10 ties. Winning through to the first round proper were Middlesbrough Ironopolis, Casuals, Blackpool, Newcastle East End, Small Heath, Sheffield United, Luton Town, Heanor Town, Old Westminsters and Crewe Alexandra. Of those, only Heanor Town and Blackpool were appearing in the competition proper for the first time although the Seasiders' predecessor outfit Blackpool St John's had entered the FA Cup twice in the early 1880s. Newcastle East End also emulated their crosstown rivals Newcastle West End in winning through the Cup qualifying rounds once before the two clubs' amalgamation during the 1892 close-season.

With Stoke re-entering the Football League and Darwen beating out Newton Heath (amongst others) for the League's final expansion place, only eight non-League clubs received byes through to the first round this season. These were future Football League members Nottingham Forest, The Wednesday, Middlesbrough, Royal Arsenal and Bootle along with Crusaders, Sunderland Albion and Birmingham St George's

For information on all matches played from the preliminary round to the fourth qualifying round, see 1891–92 FA Cup qualifying rounds.

== Results ==
=== First round ===
Tie No.	Home team	Score	Away team	Date
1	Blackpool	0–3	Sheffield United	16 January 1892
2	Preston North End	6–0	Middlesbrough Ironopolis	23 January 1892
3	Stoke	3–0 Match void	Casuals	16 January 1892
Replay	Stoke	3–0	Casuals	23 January 1892
4	Nottingham Forest	2–1	Newcastle East End	16 January 1892
5	Blackburn Rovers	4–1	Derby County	16 January 1892
6	Aston Villa	4–1	Heanor Town	16 January 1892
7	The Wednesday	2–1 Match void	Bolton Wanderers	16 January 1892
Replay	The Wednesday	4–1	Bolton Wanderers	23 January 1892
8	Bootle	0–2	Darwen	16 January 1892
9	Old Westminsters	2–3	West Bromwich Albion	16 January 1892
10	Wolverhampton Wanderers	2–2	Crewe Alexandra	16 January 1892
Replay	Crewe Alexandra	1–4	Wolverhampton Wanderers	23 January 1892
11	Sunderland	3–0 Match void	Notts County	16 January 1892
Replay	Sunderland	4–0	Notts County	23 January 1892
12	Luton Town	0–3	Middlesbrough	16 January 1892
13	Crusaders	1–4	Accrington	16 January 1892
14	Everton	2–4 Match void	Burnley	16 January 1892
Replay	Everton	1–3	Burnley	23 January 1892
15	Sunderland Albion	1–2 Match void	Birmingham St George's	16 January 1892
Replay	Sunderland Albion	4–0	Birmingham St George's	23 January 1892
16	Small Heath	5–1	Royal Arsenal	16 January 1892

=== Second round ===
Tie No.	Home team	Score	Away team	Date
1	Burnley	1–3	Stoke	30 January 1892
2	Aston Villa	2–0	Darwen	30 January 1892
3	The Wednesday	2–0	Small Heath	30 January 1892
4	Accrington	1–0 Match void	Sunderland	30 January 1892
Replay	Accrington	1–3	Sunderland	6 February 1892
5	Wolverhampton Wanderers	3–1	Sheffield United	30 January 1892
6	Middlesbrough	1–2	Preston North End	30 January 1892
7	West Bromwich Albion	3–1	Blackburn Rovers	30 January 1892
8	Sunderland Albion	0–1	Nottingham Forest	30 January 1892

=== Third round ===
Tie No.	Home team	Score	Away team	Date
1	Stoke	2–2	Sunderland	13 February 1892
Replay	Sunderland	4–0	Stoke	20 February 1892
2	Nottingham Forest	2–0	Preston North End	13 February 1892
3	Wolverhampton Wanderers	1–3	Aston Villa	13 February 1892
4	West Bromwich Albion	2–1	The Wednesday	13 February 1892

=== Semifinals ===
The original semifinal matches were played on 27 February 1892. Aston Villa comfortably came through their tie with Sunderland 4–1 but West Bromwich Albion and Nottingham Forest drew their match 1–1. The tie went to a replay, again played at Molineux, but again finished 1–1. A second replay was needed to separate the teams, played in Derby and this time West Bromwich Albion came through winners 6–2 to reach the final against Aston Villa.

Tie No.	Home team	Score	Away team	Date
1	Aston Villa	4–1	Sunderland	27 February 1892
2	West Bromwich Albion	1–1	Nottingham Forest	27 February 1892
Replay	Nottingham Forest	1–1	West Bromwich Albion	5 March 1892
Replay	West Bromwich Albion	6–2	Nottingham Forest	9 March 1892

=== Final ===
The 1892 FA Cup Final was a football match played on 19 March 1892 at the Kennington Oval. The final was contested by West Bromwich Albion and Aston Villa. West Brom won 3–0, with goals from Alf Geddes, Nicholls and John Reynolds.

19 March 1892

West Bromwich Albion	3 – 0	Aston Villa
Geddes 4'; Sam Nicholls 27'; John Reynolds 55'

Kennington Oval, London
Attendance: 32,810
Referee: J.C. Clegg (Sheffield)
