= Thomas Davenport (footballer) =

English footballer

Personal information
- Full name: Thomas Davenport
- Date of birth: 1860
- Place of birth: Birmingham, England
- Date of death: Unknown
- Place of death: Birmingham, England
- Position: Inside forward

Senior career*
Years	Team	Apps	(Gls)
- Hockley Belmont
1885–1886	Small Heath Alliance		
1886–188?	Birmingham St Luke's		
1888–1889	Small Heath	5	(1)
–	Birmingham St George's		
- * Club domestic league appearances and goals

Thomas Davenport (1860 – after 1888) was an English professional footballer who played in the Football Alliance for Small Heath. He played as an inside forward.

Davenport was born in the Kingstanding district of Birmingham. He began his football career with Hockley Belmont before joining Small Heath Alliance in August 1885. He scored six goals as the club progressed to the semi-final of the 1885–86 FA Cup, which they lost 4–0 to West Bromwich Albion, then left to play for St Luke's, before returning for Small Heath's first season in the Football Alliance. Davenport played in the club's first five games in the new competition, and another two in the 1888–89 FA Cup, then left for fellow Football Alliance side Birmingham St George's. He died in Birmingham.
