= Walter Gittins =

English footballer

Personal information
- Full name: Walter Gittins
- Date of birth: 1865
- Place of birth: Aston, England
- Date of death: Unknown
- Place of death: Birmingham, England
- Position: Full back

Senior career*
Years	Team	Apps	(Gls)
- Lozells Sports Club
1889–1890	Small Heath	21	(0)
1890–1???	Stafford Rangers		
- * Club domestic league appearances and goals

Walter Gittins (1865 – after 1890) was an English professional footballer who made 21 appearances in the Football Alliance playing for Small Heath.

Gittins was born in Aston, which is now part of Birmingham. He began his football career with Lozells Sports Club before joining Small Heath for their first season in the Football Alliance in September 1889. A solid, powerful full back, Gittins made his debut on 14 September 1889 in a 2–2 draw at home to Bootle, and was ever-present for the rest of that season, at the end of which he joined Stafford Rangers.
