= Charlie Short =

English footballer

Personal information
- Position: Forward

Senior career*
Years	Team	Apps	(Gls)
- Birmingham Excelsior
1889–1890	Small Heath	1	(0)
1890	Unity Gas		
1890–1892	Small Heath	18	(11)
1892–1???	Bloxwich Strollers		
- * Club domestic league appearances and goals

Charles Short (after 1866 – after 1891) was an English professional footballer who played in the Football Alliance for Small Heath. He played as a forward.

Short played football for Birmingham Excelsior before he signed for Small Heath in 1889, and played one game in the Football Alliance in March 1890. He then played a few games for Unity Gas before returning to Small Heath later the same year. Short, a natural goal poacher, played and scored regularly in the 1890–91 Football Alliance season. He also appeared in the 1890–91 FA Cup, taking part in the 8–0 defeat of Hednesford Town and then scoring the opening goal in a 2–0 victory against Wednesbury old Athletic in the Second Qualifying Round. However, following a complaint, it emerged that his registration, which had lapsed after he left the club, had not been renewed for that season's FA Cup, so Small Heath were disqualified from the competition for fielding an unregistered player.

Short's older brother George also played professionally for Small Heath.
