= Bootle F.C. (1879) =

Former association football club in England

Bootle
- Full name: Bootle Football Club
- Nickname: North Enders
- Founded: 1879
- Dissolved: 1893; 133 years ago
- Ground: Hawthorne Road
- League: Second Division
- 1893: 8th (resigned)
colours

Bootle Football Club was an English football club based in Bootle, Lancashire. Founder members of the Football Alliance, the club was one of the first two clubs to resign from the Football League. and also one of only two clubs (the other being Middlesbrough Ironopolis F.C.) to spend a single season in the League.

== History ==
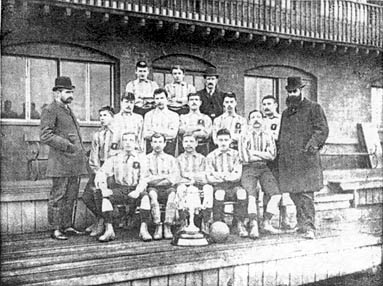
The Bootle team pictured in 1888

Bootle F.C. were formed in 1879 as Bootle St Johns A.F.C. and played their first fixture in October 1880 against Everton. Later that year the club changed its name to Bootle F.C. and then entered the FA Cup for the first time the following season.

In 1887 Bootle signed former Scotland international Andrew Watson, the first black international player. If, as is likely, he was paid then he was the first black professional footballer in history, pre-dating Arthur Wharton.

When the Football League was founded, William MacGregor invited Everton as the representatives of the city of Liverpool, rather than Bootle. Instead, in 1888-89 Bootle joined the Football Combination, and then in 1889-90 were founder members of the Football Alliance. That season was their most successful as they finished league runners-up (winning every home match), and reached the quarter-finals of the FA Cup, where they lost 7–0 to Blackburn Rovers.

However the club suffered when playing away from Hawthorne Road; in its second Alliance season, the club only secured 1 point away from home, and in the third and final season only 1 away win. At the end of the 1891–92 season, the club was in serious financial difficulties, owing £300 to lenders and £800 for the construction of new stands, against annual income of £2,000. In order to raise funds the club decided to form a limited liability company.

When the Alliance merged with the Football League in 1892, Bootle became founder members of the new Second Division. The club's crowds however declined from the usual 2–3,000 in the Alliance to just 1,000 by the end of its one League season. Despite finishing in eighth position, the club resigned, its last League action being supporting a resolution to increase the First Division to 20 clubs (opposed by Everton) to avoid Liverpool becoming a one-club monopoly. Bootle was one of the first two clubs to resign from the League, the other being Accrington F.C., and is one of only two clubs to have spent just one season in the Football League, the other being Middlesbrough Ironopolis.

In its final season the club's expenditure was £2,198, half of which was due to wages, as against an income of £1,355 plus donations of £155. The club did enter the FA Cup for 1893–94, and was drawn to play at Stockport County in the qualifying rounds, but, on 28 August 1893, before the tie could take place, the club passed a resolution putting itself into liquidation.

== Colours ==
The club's colours were blue and white, worn in various combinations and shades of blue, terminating in blue and white stripes with navy knickers.

== Ground ==
The club's first ground was on Bibby's Lane; redevelopment forced the club to move in 1882 to Marsh Lane. In 1883 the club, along with Bootle Cricket Club, developed a new ground on Hawthorne Road.

== International players ==
Four Bootle players appeared for Wales:

- Smart Arridge (2 caps with Bootle)
- Walter Evans (1 cap with Bootle)
- Billy Hughes (3 caps with Bootle)
- Job Wilding (3 caps with Bootle)

== See also ==
- Bootle F.C.
- Bootle Athletic F.C.
