= Chris Charsley =

English footballer (1864–1945)

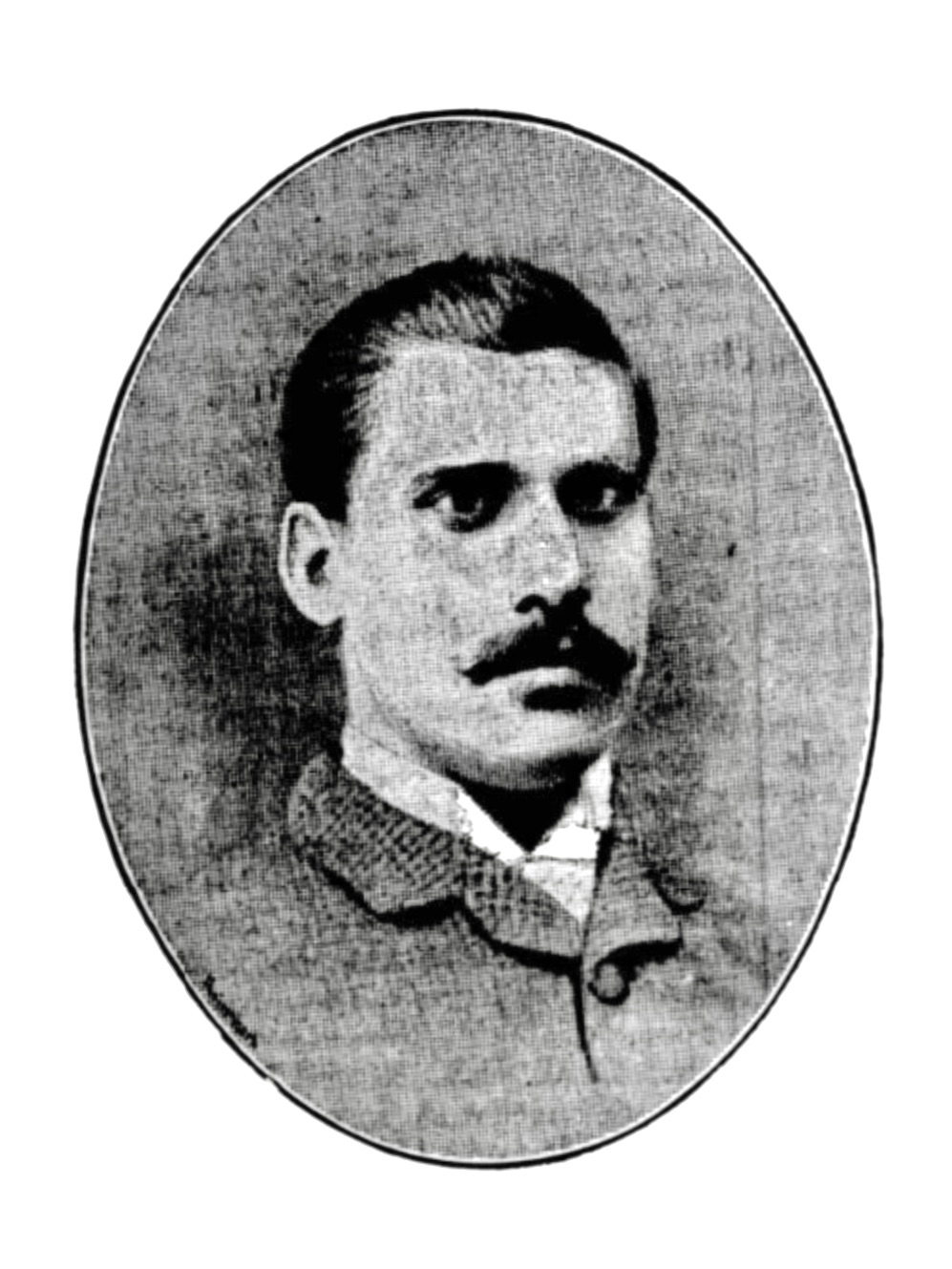
- Charsley in the Midland Athlete, 15 November 1886

Personal information
- Full name: Charles Christopher Charsley
- Date of birth: 7 November 1864
- Place of birth: Leicester, England
- Date of death: 10 January 1945 (aged 80)
- Place of death: Weston-super-Mare, England
- Position: Goalkeeper

Senior career*
Years	Team	Apps	(Gls)
1881–188?	Stafford Town		
1883–1886	Stafford Rangers		
1886	Aston Villa (guest)	0	(0)
1886–1891	Small Heath Alliance / Small Heath	36	(0)
1891	West Bromwich Albion	1	(0)
1891–1894	Small Heath	19	(0)

International career
1893	England	1	(0)
- * Club domestic league appearances and goals

Charles Christopher Charsley (7 November 1864 – 10 January 1945) was an English footballer who played as a goalkeeper for Small Heath and England, and a police officer who rose to the rank of Chief Constable.

== Career ==
Born in Leicester, he joined the Birmingham City Police in 1884. Between 1886 and 1894 he made 80 appearances in the FA Cup, Football Alliance and the Football League for Small Heath (later to become Birmingham City) as an amateur. He helped the club to the inaugural Football League Second Division championship in 1892–93, and played a few games the following season, including the test match against Darwen which won them promotion to the First Division. He also played for Aston Villa as a guest in 1886. Charsley had a brief spell with West Bromwich Albion, whom he joined in August 1891. He made his only appearance for Albion in a 2–1 defeat to Preston North End in November of the same year, before re-joining Small Heath the following month.

On 25 February 1893, he became the first Birmingham City player – and the only player who had played for the club in its Small Heath Alliance days – to represent England at full international level when he was capped against Ireland. England won 6–1 in the game which was played at Wellington Road, Perry Barr, Birmingham, with Walter Gilliat scoring three goals in his solitary England appearance.

In 1899, Charsley held the rank of inspector in the Hackney Carriage Department of the Birmingham police when he was appointed Chief Constable of Coventry. On retiring from the police force in 1919, he moved to Weston-super-Mare, Somerset, where he became deputy Mayor and served on the town council until his death at the age of 80.

His brother Walter also played a few times for Small Heath.

== Honours ==
Small Heath

- Football League Second Division: 1892–93
