= Harry Morris (footballer, born 1866) =

English footballer and businessman

Personal information
- Date of birth: 11 April 1866
- Place of birth: Birmingham, England
- Date of death: June 1931 (aged 65)
- Place of death: Birmingham, England
- Positions: Centre forward; right half

Senior career*
Years	Team	Apps	(Gls)
1883–1893	Small Heath Alliance / Small Heath	42	(2)
- * Club domestic league appearances and goals

Harry Morris (11 April 1866 – June 1931) was an English professional footballer who spent all his playing career with Small Heath (now Birmingham City). He became a successful businessman, joining the club's board of directors in 1903, and was instrumental in the club constructing and moving to the St Andrew's stadium.

== Biography ==
Morris was born in Birmingham and attended Small Heath Council School. On leaving school he took up an apprenticeship in the plumbing trade, which he combined with playing for Small Heath Alliance from 1883 at the age of 17 – the club was one of the first to turn professional, but that was not until 1885. As a youth he played as a centre forward, but gradually moved into midfield, developing into an influential wing half and captain. Much of his playing career preceded the formation of the Football Alliance, of which Small Heath was a founding member, in 1889–90, so information is not readily available on how many games he played for the club, but he was a first-team regular by 1885, and played on long enough to make one appearance in the inaugural Football League Second Division in 1892-93.

Over his career he saved £85 from his wages as a footballer, enough to take on the lease of a shop near the club's old Arthur Street ground, buy tools, and set up his own plumbing business. He made such a success of it that within ten years he was being invited to join the Small Heath board. By this time the ground at Muntz Street was becoming inadequate; a new stadium was needed, and Morris's business acumen again came to the fore. He identified an area of wet, sloping wasteland next to a railway as a potentially suitable site for a state-of-the-art football ground, convinced his fellow directors to back the idea, and served on the committee formed to organise the works. Within ten months of the land being acquired, the new ground, which would become known as St Andrew's, was opened.

Morris's investments extended beyond football. When the first talking picture came out in 1928, he saw the potential and acquired an interest in several Midlands cinemas. He remained on the Birmingham board until 1929, when his son Harry junior took his place; another son, Len, also served as a director. Harry junior became chairman of the club in 1933, and after 38 years unbroken service to the club was appointed president in 1967, the year of his death.

Morris died in June 1931 in Birmingham, not long after watching his club lose to West Bromwich Albion in the FA Cup Final. Forty-five years earlier, he had played against, and lost to, the same club in the FA Cup semi-final.
