= List of Birmingham City F.C. players (1–24 appearances) =

Small Heath F.C. pictured in 1893 with the Football League Second Division trophy. Includes players Teddy Jolley (standing, left), Bernard Pumfrey (seated, second left), and Jack Lee (on ground, right).

Birmingham City Football Club, an English association football club based in the city of Birmingham, was founded in 1875 under the name of Small Heath Alliance. They first entered the FA Cup in the 1881–82 season. When nationally organised league football began in 1888, the club, by then called simply Small Heath F.C., were not invited to join the Football League. Instead, they became a founder member of the Football Alliance, which was formed a year later. In 1892, the Football League decided to expand, and invited the Alliance clubs to join; as one of the less successful members of the Alliance, Small Heath were placed in the newly formed Second Division. The club's first team have competed in numerous nationally and internationally organised competitions, and all players who have played between 1 and 24 such matches are listed below.

More than 500 Birmingham players have appeared in such matches but failed to reach the 25-match milestone. In the early days, the scarcity of nationally organised competitive football meant players could spend many years with the club while making few such outings. Brothers Fred, Tommy and Arthur James, who was the club captain from 1878 to 1885, were founder members of Small Heath Alliance but made only 24 between them.

Numerous players left Birmingham to seek opportunities with other teams. Fred Pentland, who played in one FA Cup tie as a youngster for Birmingham, went on to play for England, coach the German and French Olympic teams, and manage Athletic Bilbao to consecutive La Liga–Copa del Rey "doubles". He was succeeded as Athletic's manager by Ralph Kirby. Steve Finnan, whose professional career began at the club, went on to win the 2005 Champions League with Liverpool and played for the Republic of Ireland at the 2002 World Cup. Some players' careers were cut short by the two World Wars. For example, Tom Farrage, a "promising young player with an eye for goal", was killed in action serving with the Parachute Regiment in 1944.

Many players spent brief periods with Birmingham on loan from other clubs. Some were young players gaining experience: Michael Carrick went on to play more than 300 Premier League matches and Sigurd Rushfeldt became the Norwegian Tippeligaen's all-time top scorer. Other loanees had an established career but were not needed by their owning club: Nigeria international Obafemi Martins scored Birmingham's winning goal against Arsenal in the 2011 Football League Cup Final before his loan spell was cut short by injury.

== Key ==
- The list is ordered first by number of appearances in total, then by number of League appearances, and then if necessary by date of debut.
- Appearances as a substitute are included.
- Statistics are correct up to and including the match played on 3 May 2025, the last match of the 2024–25 regular season. Where a player left the club permanently after this date, his statistics are updated to his date of leaving.

Player
Players marked * were registered for the club as at the date specified above.
Players with name in italics and marked † were on loan from another club for the duration of their Birmingham career. The loaning club is noted in the Notes column.
Players marked $ have won the Birmingham City F.C. Player of the Year award.

Positions key
Pre-1960s		1960s–	
GK	Goalkeeper		
FB	Full back	DF	Defender
HB	Half back	MF	Midfielder
FW	Forward		
U	Utility player		

Position
Playing positions are listed according to the tactical formations that were employed at the time. Thus the change in the names of defensive and midfield positions reflects the tactical evolution that occurred from the 1960s onwards. (Note: Playing position sourced to Matthews (2010), pp. 120–199 until the 2009–10 season, and thereafter to "Birmingham City". Soccerbase. Centurycomm. Archived from the original on 26 May 2007.)
Club career
Club career is defined as the first and last calendar years in which the player appeared for the club in any of the competitions listed below.
League appearances and League goals
League appearances and goals comprise those in the Football Alliance, the Football League and the Premier League. Appearances in the 1939–40 Football League season, abandoned after three games because of the Second World War, are excluded.
Total appearances and Total goals
Total appearances and goals comprise those in the Football Alliance, Football League (including test matches and play-offs), Premier League, FA Cup, League Cup, UEFA Europa League, Associate Members' Cup/Football League Trophy, Inter-Cities Fairs Cup, Anglo-Italian Cup, Texaco Cup, Anglo-Scottish Cup and Full Members' Cup. Matches in wartime competitions are excluded.
International selection
Countries are listed only for players who have been selected for international football. Only the highest level of international competition is given, except where a player competed for more than one country, in which case the highest level reached for each country is shown.
Between 1926 and 1950, two competing football teams claimed to represent the island of Ireland. Some players, including Birmingham's Owen Madden, appeared for both teams. For more information, see Ireland national football team (1882–1950) and Republic of Ireland national football team.
- Ireland denotes players who played for the Irish Football Association team;
- Republic of Ireland denotes players who played for the Football Association of Ireland team.
Caps
For players having played at full international level, the caps column counts the number of such appearances during his career with the club.

== Players with fewer than 25 appearances ==
Harry Wilcox went on to play more than 300 times for Plymouth Argyle and captained the club to the 1913 Southern League title.

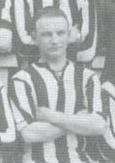
Archie Roe played for six clubs in the Football League but made only 59 appearances in total.

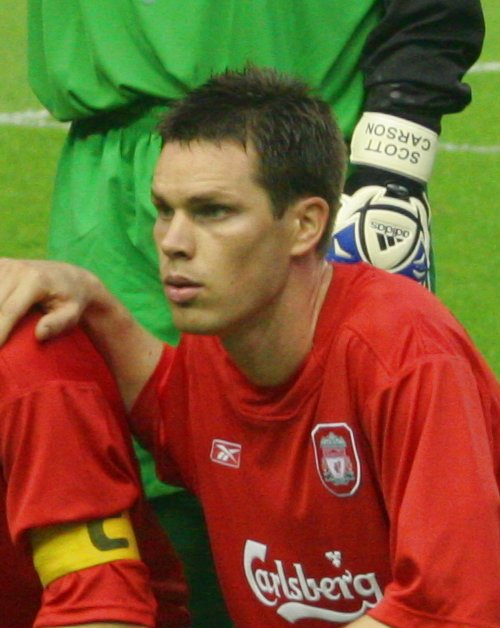
Steve Finnan, who began his professional career with Birmingham, played for the Republic of Ireland in the 2002 World Cup and won the Champions League in 2005 with Liverpool.

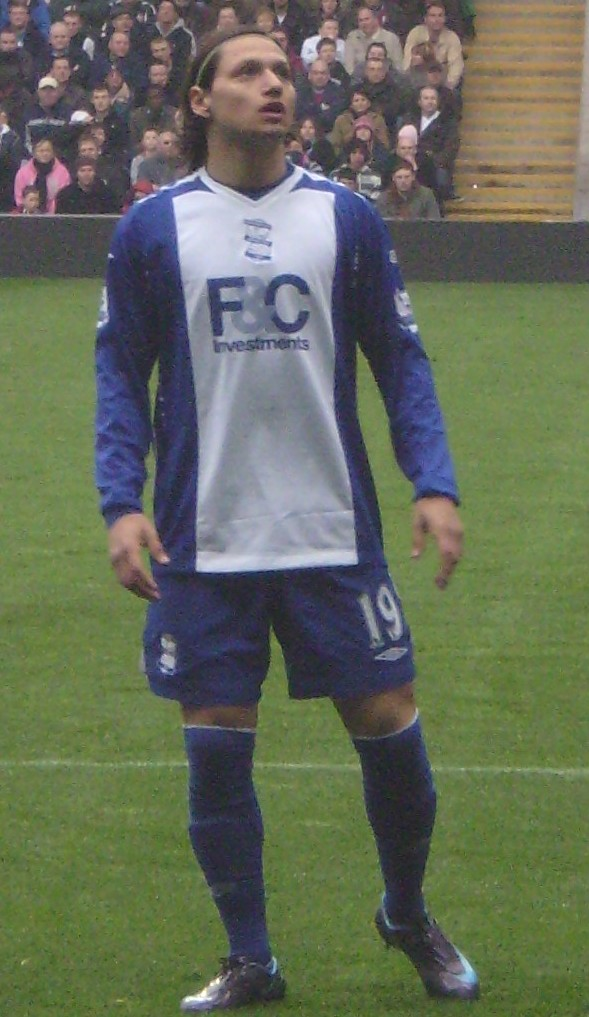
Mauro Zárate scored Lazio's goal in the 2009 Coppa Italia Final.

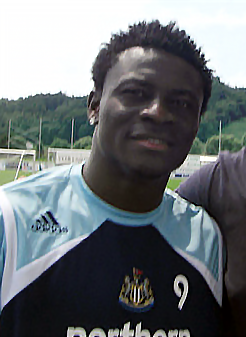
Loanee Obafemi Martins scored Birmingham's winning goal in the 2011 Football League Cup Final.

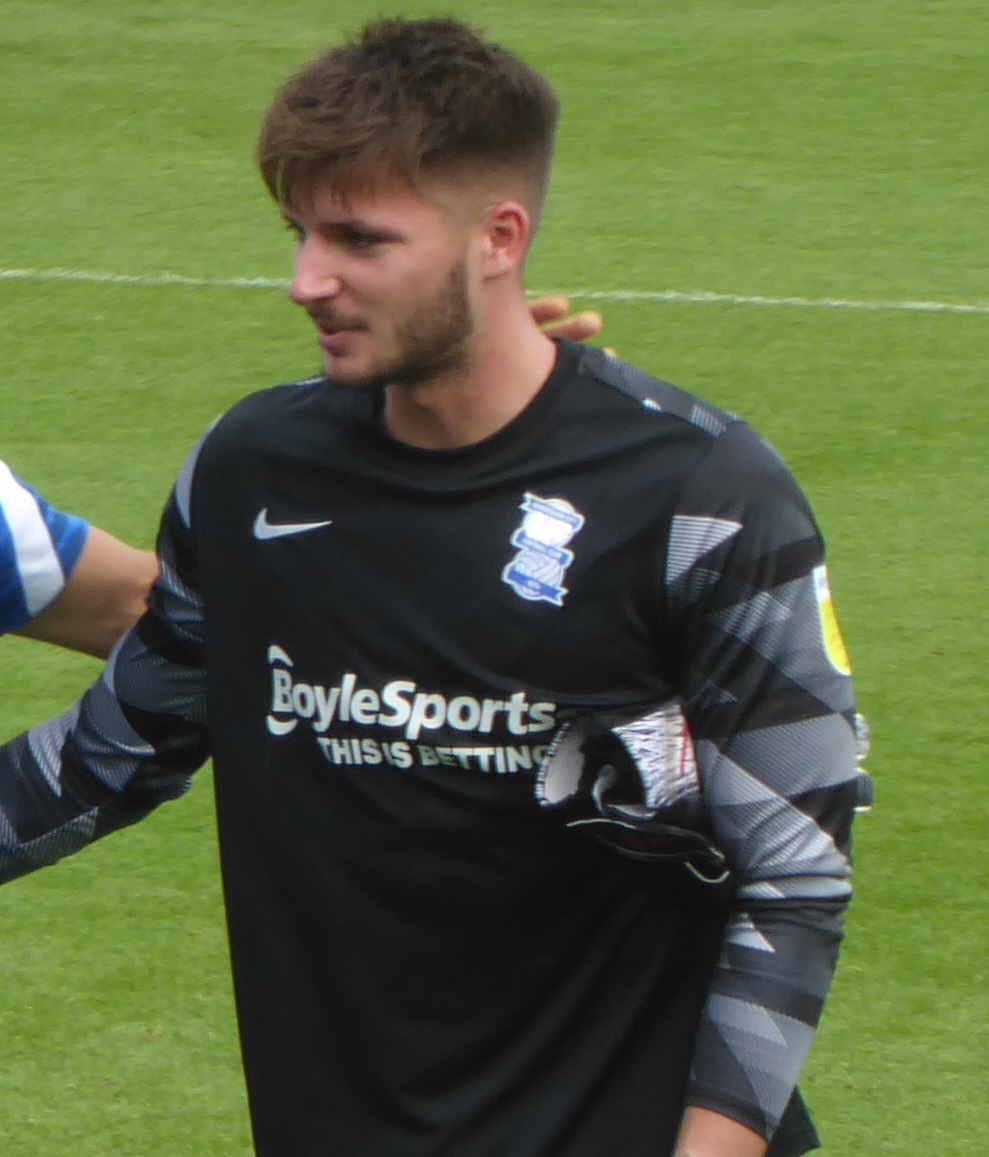
Loanee Matija Sarkic was voted Birmingham's 2021–22 Player of the Season.

Table of players, including playing position, club statistics and international selection
Player	Pos	Club career	League (Note: Appearances and goals for players whose Birmingham careers ended before the 2010–11 season are sourced to Matthews (2010), pp. 234–455, 466–483; because of proofreading errors, appearances in the 1992–93 Anglo-Italian Cup are sourced to Matthews (1995), p. 244. Later players are sourced individually.)		Total		International selection (Note: Unless sourced individually, international selection and caps are sourced to Matthews (2010), pp. 498–503 or via the alphabetical list at worldfootball.net. Number of senior caps excludes any won while out on loan from Birmingham.)	Caps	Notes	Refs
Player	Pos	Club career	Apps	Goals	Apps	Goals	International selection	Caps	Notes	Refs
Johnny Jordan	FW	1949–1950	24	2	24	2	—	—		
Jack Thorogood	FW	1930–1934	23	2	24	2	—	—		
Alberto Tarantini	DF	1978–1979	23	1	24	1	Argentina	0		
Isaac Vassell	FW	2017–2019	23	1	24	1	—	—		
Charlie Duncan	FW	1913–1915	22	6	24	9	—	—		
Frank McKee	HB	1948–1950	22	0	24	0	—	—		
Keith Bowker	FW	1970–1973	21	5	24	6	—	—		
Andy Gosney	GK	1992–1993	21	0	24	0	England youth	—		
Darren Anderton	MF	2004–2005	20	3	24	3	England	0		
Emil Hansson *	MF	2024–present	20	1	24	2	Sweden U21; Norway U19	—		
Adam Fraser	FB	1895–1896	19	0	24	0	—	—		
Paul Fenwick	DF	1992–1994	19	0	24	0	Canada	0		
Alexander Hleb †	MF	2010–2011	19	1	24	2	Belarus	4	(Note: Barcelona)	
Ken Charlery	FW	1995	17	4	24	6	Saint Lucia	0		
Gary Sprake	GK	1973–1975	16	0	24	0	Wales	5		
Teddy Jolley	HB	1893–1895	23	2	23	2	—	—		
Alex McIntosh	FW	1947–1948	23	4	23	4	—	—		
Matija Sarkic †$	GK	2021–2022	23	0	23	0	Montenegro	4	(Note: Wolverhampton Wanderers)	
Dennis Hodgetts	FW	1896–1897	22	9	23	9	England	0		
Billy Thirlaway	FW	1926–1927	22	1	23	1	—	—		
Jimmy Conlin	FW	1911–1912	21	2	23	2	England	0		
Wally Halsall	HB	1938–1939	21	0	23	0	—	—		
Oliver Burke †	FW	2023–2024	21	0	23	0	Scotland	0	(Note: Werder Bremen)	
Paul Moulden	FW	1993–1994	20	5	23	5	England youth	—		
Steve Vickers	DF	2001–2003	19	1	23	1	—	—	(Note: Middlesbrough)	
Kieran Dowell *†	MF	2025–present	19	5	23	5	England U21	—	(Note: Rangers)	
Greg Downs	DF	1990	17	0	23	1	—	—		
Alfons Sampsted * †	DF	2024–present	17	1	23	1	Iceland	2	(Note: Twente)	
Charlie Simms	HB	1884–1893	10	0	23	0	—	—		
Onel Hernández †	MF	2022	22	3	22	3	Cuba; Germany U18	0	(Note: Norwich City)	
Frank Foxall	FW	1910–1911	21	3	22	3	—	—		
Greg Stewart	FW	2016–2017	21	0	22	0	—	—		
Dougie Bell	MF	1989–1991	16	0	22	0	Scotland U21	—		
Gary Bull	FW	1994; 1996	16	6	22	8	—	—	(Note: Nottingham Forest)	
Steve Finnan	MF	1995–1996	15	1	22	1	Republic of Ireland	0		
Billy Blyth	U	1929–1930	21	4	21	4	—	—		
Wilson Lewis	FW	1897–1898	20	7	21	7	—	—		
John Ballantyne	FW	1913–1914	20	2	21	2	—	—		
Jack McKay	FW	1910–1911	19	2	21	2	—	—		
Quincy Owusu-Abeyie †	MF	2008	19	2	21	3	Ghana; Netherlands U21	2	(Note: Spartak Moscow)	
Will Packwood	DF	2012–2014	18	0	21	0	United States U23	—		
Chuks Aneke	FW	2021–2022	18	2	21	2	England U19	—		
Charlie Craven	FW	1938–1939	17	2	21	2	—	—		
Tyler Roberts *	MF	2023–present	17	0	21	0	Wales	0		
Adam Legzdins	GK	2015–2017	15	0	21	0	—	—		
Dennis Clarke	DF	1973–1975	14	0	21	0	—	—		
Neal Eardley	DF	2013–2016	14	0	21	0	Wales	0		
Alfie Chang *	MF	2021–present	13	0	21	0	—	—		
Jack Needham	FW	1909–1910	20	5	20	5	—	—		
Roger Willis	MF	1994	19	5	20	5	England semi-pro	—		
Willie Gildea	HB	1911–1912	18	1	20	1	—	—		
Kemy Agustien †	MF	2008–2009	18	0	20	0	Curaçao; Netherlands U21	0	(Note: AZ Alkmaar)	
Olly Lee	MF	2013–2014	16	1	20	2	—	—		
Reece Brown	MF	2013–2017	16	0	20	0	England U20	—		
Mike Newell	FW	1996–1997	15	1	20	3	England B	—		
Matt Derbyshire †	FW	2010–2011	13	0	20	3	England U21	—	(Note: Olympiacos)	
Albert Rawson	FW	1923	19	9	19	9	—	—		
Francis McGurk	FW	1933–1934	19	3	19	3	Scotland	1		
Archie Garrett	FW	1947–1948	19	5	19	5	—	—		
Bobby Laing	FW	1947–1949	19	2	19	2	—	—		
Geoff Scott	DF	1982	19	0	19	0	—	—		
Carl Richards	FW	1988–1989	19	2	19	2	England semi-pro	—		
Charlie Short	FW	1890; 1890–1891	18	11	19	12	—	—		
Lloyd Dyer †	MF	2015	18	1	19	1	—	—	(Note: Watford)	
Bud Brocken	FW	1981–1982	17	0	19	0	Netherlands	0		
Rowan Vine	FW	2007	17	1	19	1	—	—		
Kyle Bartley †	DF	2013–2014	17	3	19	5	England U17	—	(Note: Swansea City)	
Arthur Gardner	FW	1898–1899	16	9	19	11	—	—		
Graham Leggat	FW	1967–1968	16	4	19	4	Scotland	0		
Danny Wallace	FW	1993–1994	16	2	19	2	England	0		
David Edgar	DF	2014–2015	16	1	19	1	Canada	9		
Ricky Sbragia	DF	1974–1978	15	1	19	1	—	—		
Mark McCarrick	DF	1983–1984	15	0	19	0	—	—		
Miguel de Souza	FW	1994–1995	15	0	19	0	—	—		
Scott Wright *	MF	2024–present	13	1	19	3	Scotland U21	—		
Terry Lees	DF	1979–1981	12	0	19	0	—	—		
Richard Scott	DF	1993–1995	12	0	19	0	—	—		
Ayumu Yokoyama *	FW	2024–present	10	0	19	4	Japan U20	—		
Jack Kirton	FW	1897–1898	18	2	18	2	—	—		
George Gallimore	FW	1910–1911	18	1	18	1	—	—		
Sid Moffat	FW	1933–1935	18	3	18	3	—	—		
Federico Macheda †	FW	2014	18	10	18	10	Italy U21	—	(Note: Manchester United)	
Rekeem Harper †	MF	2021	18	0	18	0	England U19	—	(Note: West Bromwich Albion)	
Bert Linnecor	U	1956–1957	17	0	18	0	—	—		
Jesper Grønkjær	MF	2004	16	0	18	1	Denmark	4		
Willie Johnston †	FW	1979–1980	15	0	18	0	Scotland	0	(Note: Vancouver Whitecaps)	
Grant Hanley *	DF	2025–present	15	0	18	0	Scotland	0		
Jefferson Montero †	MF	2019–2020	14	0	18	0	Ecuador	0		
Colin Brazier	MF	1982–1983	11	1	18	1	England semi-pro	—		
George Layton	U	1899–1900	17	3	17	3	—	—		
Billy Peplow	FW	1907–1908	17	0	17	0	—	—		
Billy Smith	FW	1908–1909	17	5	17	5	—	—		
Ernie Edwards	HB	1913–1915	17	0	17	0	—	—		
Emyr Huws †	MF	2014	17	2	17	2	Wales	1	(Note: Manchester City)	
Fran Villalba	MF	2019	17	1	17	1	Spain U19	—		
Alen Halilović	MF	2020–2021	17	1	17	1	Croatia	0		
James Short	FW	1919–1920	16	10	17	10	—	—		
Jim Roach	GK	1895–1896	15	0	17	0	—	—		
Harry Wilcox	FW	1898–1899	15	3	17	3	—	—	(Note: Matthews attributes Wilcox's 18 February 1899 appearance against New Brighton Tower to Bob McRoberts, who had broken a collarbone the previous week.)	
Tot Pike	FW	1928–1929	15	4	17	4	—	—		
James Vaughan	FW	2015–2016	15	0	17	0	England U21	—	(Note: Huddersfield Town)	
William Meates	GK	1895–1896	14	0	17	0	—	—		
Stan Davies	FW	1927–1928	14	2	17	5	Wales	0		
Bill Finney	FW	1955–1957	14	0	17	1	—	—		
Sam Cosgrove	FW	2021–2023	14	0	17	0	—	—		
Mark Burchill †	FW	2000	13	4	17	5	Scotland	0	(Note: Celtic)	
Bernard Lowe	FW	1908–1910	16	3	16	3	—	—		
Jack Coxford	HB	1927–1930	16	0	16	0	—	—		
Hamer Bouazza †	MF	2009	16	1	16	1	Algeria	2	(Note: Fulham)	
Micky Good	FW	1896–1898	15	1	16	1	—	—		
Moses Lane	FW	1923–1924	15	4	16	4	—	—		
Alan Miller †	GK	1991–1992	15	0	16	0	England U21	—	(Note: Arsenal)	
Trésor Luntala	MF	2001	15	0	16	0	DR Congo	0		
Rafael Schmitz †	DF	2007–2008	15	0	16	0	—	—	(Note: Lille)	
Andros Townsend †	MF	2012	15	0	16	0	England	0	(Note: Tottenham Hotspur)	
Omar Bogle †	FW	2018	15	1	16	1	England C	—	(Note: Cardiff City)	
Nico Gordon	DF	2020–2022	15	1	16	1	Montserrat	0		
Charles Sprigg	FW	1912–1913; 1914–1915	14	0	16	0	—	—		
Mick Darrell	FW	1965–1970	14	2	16	2	—	—		
Jim Blyth	GK	1982–1983	14	0	16	0	Scotland	0		
Peter Ramage †	DF	2012	14	0	16	0	—	—	(Note: Queens Park Rangers)	
Adam Clayton	MF	2020–2021	14	0	16	0	England U20	—		
Reda Khadra †	MF	2023	14	3	16	4	Germany U21	—	(Note: Brighton & Hove Albion)	
Tom Scrivens	FW	1899–1900	13	5	16	9	—	—		
Dwight Yorke	FW	2004–2005	13	2	16	2	Trinidad and Tobago	4		
Phil Sproson	DF	1989	12	0	16	1	—	—		
Eamonn Dolan	FW	1991	12	1	16	1	Republic of Ireland U21	—		
Koby Arthur	MF	2013–2015	12	0	16	0	—	—		
Martin Jiránek	DF	2010–2011	10	0	16	0	Czech Republic	0		
Charlie Lakin	MF	2018–2021	10	0	16	0	—	—		
Bailey Peacock-Farrell *	GK	2024–present	9	0	16	0	Northern Ireland	2		
Ian Richardson	MF	1995–1996	7	0	16	0	England semi-pro	—		
Tom White	FB	1919–1920	15	0	15	0	—	—		
Charlie Bosbury	FW	1922–1923	15	0	15	0	—	—		
Aubrey Powell	FW	1950	15	1	15	1	Wales	1		
Paul Barnes	FW	1996	15	7	15	7	—	—		
Matthew Fox	DF	1989–1991	14	0	15	0	—	—		
Connal Trueman	GK	2018–2022	14	0	15	0	—	—		
Bob Meacock	HB	1938–1939	13	0	15	0	—	—		
David Bentley †	MF	2011	13	0	15	1	England	0		
Owen Madden	FW	1938–1939	12	1	15	5	Republic of Ireland; Ireland	0; 0		
Brian Rushton	DF	1963	12	0	15	0	—	—		
Les Sealey †	GK	1992	12	0	15	0	—	—	(Note: Aston Villa)	
Ronnie Morris	FW	1988–1989	11	0	15	0	English Schools	—		
Gilbert Smith	FB	1893	14	0	14	0	—	—		
Jack Higginson	FW	1900–1901	14	4	14	4	—	—		
George Southall	FW	1906–1907	14	0	14	0	—	—		
Mauro Zárate †	FW	2008	14	4	14	4	Argentina U20	—	(Note: Al-Sadd)	
Scott Sinclair †	MF	2009	14	0	14	0	Great Britain; England U21	—	(Note: Chelsea)	
Lyle Taylor †	FW	2022	14	5	14	5	Montserrat	0		
Bernard Pumfrey	FB	1892–1894	12	1	14	1	—	—	(Note: Matthews attributes Pumfrey's 30 December 1893 appearance against Lincoln City to Bill Purves, who did not join Small Heath until March 1894.)	
Hugh Evans	FW	1949–1950	11	0	14	0	—	—		
Darryl Powell	MF	2002–2003	11	0	14	0	Jamaica	0		
Tom Handley	HB	1907–1909	13	0	13	0	—	—		
Edmund Harvey	FW	1924–1927	13	0	13	0	—	—		
Paddy Mills	FW	1929	13	3	13	3	—	—		
Isaiah Rankin †	FW	2000	13	4	13	4	Cayman Islands	0	(Note: Bradford City)	
Johan Djourou †	DF	2007	13	0	13	0	Switzerland	5		
Rob Hall †	FW	2012–2013	13	0	13	0	England U19	—	(Note: West Ham United)	
Jesse Lingard †	MF	2013	13	6	13	6	England	0		
Kerim Frei	MF	2017	13	1	13	1	Turkey; Switzerland U21	0		
William Reynolds	FB	1893–1894	12	0	13	0	—	—		
Ray Shaw	MF	1937–1946	12	0	13	0	—	—	(Note: Player statistics exclude three matches played in the aborted 1939–40 Football League season.)	
Jack Wheeler	GK	1938–1948	12	0	13	0	—	—		
Paul Holmes	DF	1992–1993	12	0	13	0	—	—		
Alonzo Drake	FW	1907–1908	11	2	13	2	—	—		
Robbie Blake	FW	2005	11	2	13	2	—	—		
Jim Barrett	FW	1959–1960	10	4	13	5	—	—		
Folorunso Okenla	MF	1991–1992	7	1	13	1	Nigeria	0		
Thomas Davenport	FW	1885–1886; 1889–1890	5	1	13	8	—	—		
James Williams	FW	1908–1909	12	3	12	3	Wales	0		
Harry Graham	FW	1911–1912	12	4	12	4	—	—		
Bernard Smith	FB	1932–1935	12	0	12	0	—	—		
Jack Kelly	FW	1938	12	1	12	1	—	—		
Kevin Dearden †	GK	1992	12	0	12	0	—	—		
Vinny Samways †	MF	1996	12	0	12	0	England U21	—	(Note: Everton)	
Rob Kiernan †	DF	2015	12	1	12	1	Republic of Ireland U21	—	(Note: Wigan Athletic)	
Harry Lappin	FW	1909–1910	11	2	12	3	—	—		
Bob Bonthron	FB	1910–1911	11	1	12	1	—	—		
Guy Russell	FW	1985–1988	11	0	12	0	—	—		
Paul Williams †	FW	1995	11	0	12	1	England B	—	(Note: Crystal Palace)	
Kenny Brown	DF	1997	11	0	12	0	—	—		
Steve Seddon	DF	2019–2021	11	0	12	0	—	—		
Ian Osborne	DF	1973–1976	10	0	12	0	—	—		
David Speedie †	FW	1992	10	2	12	2	Scotland	0	(Note: Southampton)	
Peter Atherton †	DF	2001	10	0	12	0	England U21	—		
Daniël de Ridder	MF	2007–2008	10	0	12	0	Netherlands U21	—		
Matt Green	FW	2013	10	1	12	2	England C	—		
Phil Robinson †	MF	1991	9	0	12	0	—	—	(Note: Notts County)	
Míchel	MF	2010	9	0	12	0	—	—		
Alex Bruce	DF	2006	6	0	12	0	Northern Ireland; Republic of Ireland	0; 0		
Fred James	HB	1881–1886	0	0	12	0	—	—		
Tommy Robinson	FW	1930–1933	11	1	11	1	—	—		
Jack Shaw	HB	1939	11	0	11	0	—	—		
Paul Tomlinson †	GK	1987	11	0	11	0	—	—	(Note: Sheffield United)	
Nicky Hunt †	DF	2008	11	0	11	0	England U21	—	(Note: Bolton Wanderers)	
Erik Huseklepp †	FW	2012	11	2	11	2	Norway	1	(Note: Portsmouth)	
Jordon Ibe †	MF	2014	11	1	11	1	England U21	—	(Note: Liverpool)	
Cheick Keita	DF	2017	11	0	11	0	Mali U20	—		
Dick Butler	HB	1936–1938	10	0	11	0	—	—		
John Paskin †	FW	1991–1992	10	3	11	3	—	—		
Chris Sutton	FW	2006	10	1	11	1	England	0		
Nigel Quashie †	MF	2008–2009	10	0	11	0	Scotland; England B	0		
Tony Hey	MF	1997	9	0	11	1	—	—		
Jason Lowe	MF	2017–2018	9	0	11	0	England U21	—		
Marcos Painter	DF	2005–2006	5	0	11	0	Republic of Ireland U21	—		
George Getgood	HB	1921	10	0	10	0	—	—		
Kenny Kendrick	FW	1937–1939	10	3	10	3	—	—		
Billy Hume	U	1959–1960	10	2	10	2	—	—		
Matt Jackson †	DF	1996	10	0	10	0	England U21	—		
Leroy Lita †	FW	2012	10	3	10	3	England U21	—		
Will Buckley †	FW	2016	10	1	10	1	—	—	(Note: Sunderland)	
Andre Dozzell †	MF	2024	10	1	10	1	England U20	—		
Daniel Bruce	FW	1895–1896	9	2	10	2	Scotland	0		
Harry Haynes	HB	1895–1896	9	0	10	0	—	—		
George Johnston	FW	1969–1970	9	1	10	1	—	—		
Allan Johnston †	MF	1999	9	0	10	0	Scotland	0		
Teden Mengi †	DF	2022	9	0	10	0	England U21	—		
Ernie Sykes	FB	1937–1939	8	0	10	0	—	—		
Stuart Storer	FW	1984–1987	8	0	10	0	—	—		
Josh McEachran	MF	2019–2020	8	0	10	0	England U21	—		
Darren Ambrose	MF	2012–2013	7	0	10	1	England U21	—		
Romelle Donovan *	MF	2023–present	7	0	10	0	England U19	—		
Bill Taylor	U	1891–1892	6	0	10	1	—	—		
Alex Jackson	FW	1958–1959	6	6	10	7	—	—		
Josh Williams	MF	2022	6	0	10	0	—	—		
Howard Forinton	FW	1998–1999	5	1	10	1	—	—		
Ted Hill	FW	1885–1889	0	0	10	5	—	—		
Edgar Bluff	FW	1907–1908	9	1	9	1	—	—		
Arthur Johnson	FW	1927	9	0	9	0	—	—		
David Jones	FW	1958	9	0	9	0	England youth	—		
Kevin Rogers	MF	1983–1984	9	1	9	1	Wales youth	—		
Alex Pritchard	MF	2024	9	0	9	0	England U21	—		
Fred Jones	FB	1892–1893	8	0	9	0	Wales	1		
Wally Quinton	FB	1947–1949	8	0	9	0	—	—		
Peter Warmington	FW	1954–1956	8	3	9	3	—	—		
Frank Carrodus	MF	1982	8	0	9	0	—	—		
Richie Moran	FW	1990–1991	8	1	9	1	—	—		
Grégory Vignal	DF	2009–2010	8	0	9	0	France U21	—		
Jack Leonard	FW	1899–1900	7	1	9	1	—	—		
Sigurd Rushfeldt †	FW	1995	7	0	9	1	Norway	0	(Note: Tromsø)	
Jae Martin	MF	1995–1996	7	0	9	0	—	—		
Lee Bradbury †	FW	1999	7	0	9	0	England U21	—		
Thomas Myhre †	GK	2000	7	0	9	0	Norway	1		
Grant Hall †	DF	2014	7	0	9	0	—	—		
Carl Jenkinson †	DF	2017–2018	7	0	9	0	England; Finland U21	0		
Caolan Boyd-Munce	MF	2019–2020	7	0	9	0	Northern Ireland	0		
Eddie Newton	MF	1999–2000	4	0	9	0	England U21	—		
William Figures	FW	1885–1887	0	0	9	2	—	—		
Harry Haddon	FW	1896	8	2	8	2	—	—		
Joe Smith	HB	1913–1914	8	0	8	0	—	—		
Bobby Booth	HB	1920–1921	8	1	8	1	—	—		
Ernie Watkins	FW	1922–1923	8	1	8	1	—	—		
Harry Bruce	FB	1925–1927	8	0	8	0	—	—		
Tommy Capel	FW	1949	8	2	8	2	—	—		
Bob Catlin †	GK	1993	8	0	8	0	Australia B	—		
John Cornforth	MF	1996	8	0	8	0	Wales	0		
Carlos Costly †	FW	2009	8	0	8	0	Honduras	2	(Note: GKS Bełchatów)	
Tyler Blackett †	DF	2014	8	0	8	0	England U21	—		
Aaron Martin	DF	2014	8	0	8	0	English Schools	—		
Wayne Mumford	DF	1982–1984	7	0	8	0	Wales youth	—		
John Deakin	MF	1989	7	0	8	0	—	—		
Jason Beckford	FW	1992	7	2	8	2	England youth	—		
Simon Marsh	DF	1998–1999	7	0	8	0	England U21	—		
Wilson Palacios †	MF	2007–2008	7	0	8	0	Honduras	2	(Note: Olimpia)	
Jimmy Robertson	FW	1933–1934	6	1	8	2	Scotland	0		
Nicolai Brock-Madsen	FW	2015	6	0	8	0	Denmark U21	—		
Odin Bailey	MF	2019–2020	6	1	8	1	England U16	—		
Kevin Summerfield	FW	1982–1983	5	1	8	2	England youth	—		
Cohen Bramall †	DF	2017–2018	5	0	8	0	—	—		
Marcel Oakley	DF	2021–2023	4	0	8	1	—	—		
Brandon Khela *	MF	2023–present	3	0	8	1	England U17	—		
Thomas Hedges	GK	1883–1886	0	0	8	0	—	—		
Jerry Hare	FB	1884–1887	0	0	8	0	—	—		
Robert Evetts	FB	1885–1887	0	0	8	1	—	—		
Wilton Lines	FW	1889–1890	7	1	7	1	—	—		
Jack Lee	FW	1893	7	3	7	3	—	—		
Josiah Preston	FB	1909–1910	7	0	7	0	—	—		
William Carrier	FB	1910	7	0	7	0	—	—		
Albert Lindon	GK	1910–1911	7	0	7	0	—	—		
Tom Farrage	FW	1938–1939	7	2	7	2	—	—		
Walter Aveyard	FW	1947	7	3	7	3	—	—		
Paul Ivey	FW	1979–1981	7	0	7	0	—	—		
Mark Smalley †	DF	1986	7	0	7	0	England youth	—		
Paul Fitzpatrick	MF	1993	7	0	7	0	—	—		
Christopher Wreh †	FW	1999	7	1	7	1	Liberia	0		
Aaron McLean †	FW	2013	7	0	7	0	England C	—	(Note: Hull City)	
Yan Valery †	DF	2021	7	0	7	0	Tunisia; France U18	0		
Jimmy Robertson	FW	1903	6	2	7	2	—	—		
Paul Gorman	MF	1984	6	0	7	0	Republic of Ireland U21	—		
Dave Regis	FW	1994	6	2	7	2	—	—		
David Preece †	MF	1995–1996	6	0	7	0	England B	—	(Note: Derby County)	
Martin Latka †	DF	2006	6	0	7	0	Czech Republic	0	(Note: Slavia Prague)	
John James	FW	1953–1955	5	2	7	2	—	—		
Ray Barlow	MF	1960	5	0	7	0	England	0		
John Regan	FW	1962–1964	5	2	7	2	—	—		
Danny Hill †	MF	1995	5	0	7	0	England U21	—		
Scott Allan †	MF	2013–2014	5	0	7	2	Scotland U21	—		
Eric Barber	FW	1966–1967	4	1	7	2	Republic of Ireland	1		
Alan Whitehead	DF	1972–1973	4	0	7	0	—	—		
Joey Hutchinson	DF	2001–2003	4	0	7	0	—	—		
Mark Duffy	MF	2014–2015	4	0	7	1	—	—		
Tommy James	HB	1881–1884	0	0	7	1	—	—		
Walter Felton	HB	1884–1886	0	0	7	1	—	—		
James Adlington	FW	1895–1896	6	4	6	4	—	—		
James Higgins	FW	1898	6	3	6	3	—	—		
Ike Webb	GK	1898–1900	6	0	6	0	—	—		
Jack Smith	FW	1906–1907	6	1	6	1	—	—		
Crosby Henderson	FB	1910	6	0	6	0	—	—		
Arthur Stanton	FB	1914–1915	6	0	6	0	—	—		
Tom Evans	HB	1919–1920	6	0	6	0	—	—		
Eddie Cameron	FW	1921–1922	6	1	6	1	—	—		
Fred Hoyland	FW	1924	6	0	6	0	—	—		
Jackie Mittell	GK	1932–1933	6	0	6	0	—	—		
Fred Shaw	FW	1934	6	0	6	0	—	—		
Sam Small	FW	1934–1937	6	0	6	0	—	—		
John Hughes	FW	1947–1948	6	0	6	0	—	—		
Eddie O'Hara	FW	1949–1951	6	0	6	0	—	—		
Sean Francis	FW	1991–1992	6	0	6	0	—	—		
Steve Sutton	GK	1996	6	0	6	0	—	—		
Curtis Fleming †	DF	2001	6	0	6	0	Republic of Ireland	0		
Alan Kelly †	GK	2001	6	0	6	0	Republic of Ireland	0	(Note: Blackburn Rovers)	
Teemu Tainio †	MF	2009–2010	6	0	6	0	Finland	2		
Tom Thorpe †	DF	2014	6	0	6	0	England U21	—		
Brek Shea †	MF	2014	6	0	6	0	United States	0	(Note: Stoke City)	
Kyle Lafferty †	FW	2016	6	1	6	1	Northern Ireland	2		
Taylor Richards †	MF	2022	6	0	6	0	England U17	—		
William Owen	GK	1927	5	0	6	0	—	—		
Richard Cooke †	MF	1986	5	0	6	0	England U21	—		
Martin Russell †	MF	1986	5	0	6	0	Republic of Ireland U21	—		
Lyndon Hooper	MF	1993	5	0	6	0	Canada	5		
Obafemi Martins †	FW	2011	4	0	6	2	Nigeria	0	(Note: Rubin Kazan)	
Roy Morton	MF	1974–1975	3	0	6	1	England youth	—		
Walter Ward	GK	1890–1891	5	0	5	0	—	—		
Harry Edwards	FW	1892	5	1	5	1	—	—		
Charlie Letherbarrow	FW	1894–1895	5	3	5	3	—	—		
Bill Edwards	FW	1896	5	1	5	1	—	—		
John Hirons	FW	1903	5	0	5	0	—	—		
Aaron Jones	FW	1905–1906	5	0	5	0	—	—		
Peter Neil	FW	1921	5	0	5	0	—	—		
Frank Sharp	FW	1922	5	0	5	0	—	—		
Wilf Threlfall	FW	1927	5	0	5	0	—	—		
Ken Tewkesbury	GK	1930–1931	5	0	5	0	England amateur	—		
Reg Keating	FW	1931–1932	5	1	5	1	—	—		
Arthur Hubbard	FB	1934	5	0	5	0	—	—		
Syd Owen	HB	1946	5	0	5	0	England	0		
Sid Ottewell	FW	1947	5	2	5	2	—	—		
Fred Hall	FW	1947–1949	5	2	5	2	—	—		
Fred Slater	FW	1948–1949	5	1	5	1	—	—		
Keith Neale	FW	1957	5	1	5	1	—	—		
Dennis Isherwood	DF	1966–1967	5	1	5	1	—	—		
Trevor Dark	MF	1979	5	1	5	1	—	—		
Carl Francis	MF	1982	5	0	5	0	—	—		
Billy Garton †	DF	1986	5	0	5	0	—	—		
Marc North †	FW	1987	5	1	5	1	—	—	(Note: Luton Town)	
David Madden †	MF	1990	5	1	5	1	—	—		
Mark Rutherford	MF	1990	5	0	5	0	—	—		
Kevin Drinkell †	FW	1991	5	2	5	2	—	—	(Note: Coventry City)	
Richard Huxford †	DF	1994	5	0	5	0	—	—	(Note: Millwall)	
Tony Cottee †	FW	1997	5	1	5	1	England	0	(Note: Leicester City)	
Jamie Pollock †	MF	2001	5	0	5	0	England U21	—		
Andy Cole †	FW	2007	5	1	5	1	England	0		
Brian Howard	MF	2014	5	1	5	1	England U20	—		
Jerome Sinclair †	FW	2017	5	0	5	0	England U17	—		
Amari Miller	MF	2021	5	0	5	0	—	—		
Przemysław Płacheta †	MF	2022	5	1	5	1	Poland	0		
Frederick Wilkes	FW	1891	4	1	5	4	—	—		
Bert Powell	FW	1911	4	1	5	1	—	—		
Greg Farrell	FW	1962–1963	4	0	5	0	—	—		(Note: Matthews attributes Farrell's appearance against Everton on 4 October 1963 to Mike Hellawell, who was unavailable because of influenza.)
Dean Williams	GK	1990–1991	4	0	5	0	—	—		
Anders Limpar	MF	1997	4	0	5	0	Sweden	0		
Arkadiusz Bąk †	MF	2001–2002	4	0	5	0	Poland	1	(Note: Polonia Warsaw)	
Jack Storer	FW	2016–2017	4	0	5	0	—	—		
Bez Lubala	FW	2018	4	0	5	0	—	—		
Steve Barnes	MF	1995–1996	3	0	5	0	—	—		
Juan Castillo †	DF	2021–2022	3	0	5	0	Netherlands U20	—		
Jake Jervis	FW	2010–2013	2	0	5	0	—	—		
Mark Prudhoe	GK	1984–1985	1	0	5	0	—	—		
Walter Hards	FW	1881–1883	0	0	5	2	—	—		
Billy Slater	FW	1881–1883	0	0	5	4	—	—		
Arthur James	FW	1881–1885	0	0	5	4	—	—		
Leslie Wilcox	FW	1890	4	2	4	2	—	—		
Walter Jackson	FW	1893–1894	4	1	4	1	—	—		
Walter Gadsby	FW	1897	4	3	4	3	—	—		
James Tebbs	FW	1900–1901	4	1	4	1	—	—		
Jock Henderson	FW	1901	4	0	4	0	—	—		
Arthur Harrison	FW	1902–1903	4	3	4	3	—	—		
Fred Chaplin	HB	1904	4	0	4	0	—	—		
Bill McCafferty	FW	1906–1907	4	0	4	0	—	—		
Arthur Morris	FW	1907	4	2	4	2	—	—		
Percy Gooch	FW	1907	4	1	4	1	—	—		
John Burton	FW	1909–1910	4	3	4	3	—	—		
Tom Pointon	FW	1914	4	1	4	1	England amateur trial	—		
David Dixon	FB	1921–1925	4	0	4	0	—	—		
Ray Crawshaw	HB	1934	4	0	4	0	—	—		
Geoffrey Moreland	FW	1938	4	0	4	0	—	—		
Dennis Hill	FW	1954–1955	4	0	4	0	—	—		
Bud Houghton	FW	1957–1958	4	1	4	1	—	—		
Roger Jones †	GK	1982	4	0	4	0	England U23	—		
Kevin Bremner †	FW	1982	4	1	4	1	—	—	(Note: Colchester United)	
Ivor Linton	U	1983	4	0	4	0	—	—		
Tony Morley †	FW	1984	4	3	4	3	England	0		
Micky Burton	MF	1988–1989	4	0	4	0	—	—		
Alan O'Neill	FW	1992	4	0	4	0	—	—		
James Quinn	FW	1993	4	0	4	0	Northern Ireland	0		
Ian Hendon †	DF	1995	4	0	4	0	England U21	—	(Note: Leyton Orient)	
Terry Cooke †	MF	1996	4	0	4	0	England U21	—		
Carlos Ferrari †	MF	2001	4	0	4	0	—	—	(Note: Mirassol)	
Tom Williams	DF	2002	4	0	4	0	Cyprus	0		
Zach Jeacock	MF	2020–2022	4	0	4	0	England U19	—		
Jayden Reid	FW	2020	4	0	4	0	—	—		
Arthur Millard	FW	1891–1892	3	1	4	3	—	—		
Arthur Littleford	FB	1893–1894	3	0	4	0	—	—		
Derek Carr	U	1949–1950	3	0	4	0	—	—		
David Foy	MF	1991–1993	3	0	4	0	—	—		
Jacques Williams	MF	2000	3	0	4	0	England U18	—		
Steve Jenkins †	DF	2000–2001	3	0	4	0	Wales	0		
Albert Rusnák †	MF	2014	3	0	4	0	Slovakia	0		
Ryan Stirk	MF	2021–2022	3	0	4	0	Wales U21	—		
Lindley Jenkins	MF	1973	2	0	4	0	—	—		
Ian Muir	FW	1983; 1995	2	0	4	0	England youth	—		
Simon Black	FW	1993	2	0	4	0	—	—		
John Sheridan †	MF	1996	2	0	4	0	Republic of Ireland	0	(Note: Sheffield Wednesday)	
Craig Fagan	FW	2002–2003	1	0	4	0	—	—		
Tate Campbell	MF	2021–2022	1	0	4	0	—	—		
Sam Gessey	FB	1881–1883	0	0	4	0	—	—		
Walter Jones	FW	1882–1883	0	0	4	0	—	—		
Richard Elliman	FB	1882–1884	0	0	4	0	—	—		
Francis Banks	GK	1889–1890	3	0	3	0	—	—		
Walter Charsley	HB	1890–1891	3	0	3	0	—	—		
Walter Brown	FW	1891	3	2	3	2	—	—		
Fred Allen	FW	1891	3	0	3	0	—	—		
Joe Fountain	FW	1895–1896	3	0	3	0	—	—		
Alfred Gard	FW	1901	3	0	3	0	—	—		
Bill Bidmead	FB	1903–1906	3	0	3	0	—	—		
George Moore	FW	1908	3	1	3	1	—	—		
Wilf Haines	FW	1908	3	0	3	0	—	—		
Harry Draper	FW	1910	3	0	3	0	—	—		
David Morris	FW	1911	3	0	3	0	—	—		
Sid Webb	FW	1911	3	0	3	0	—	—		
Harry Bates	FW	1912	3	0	3	0	—	—		
Bob Evans	GK	1913	3	0	3	0	Wales	0		
Peter Neilson	FW	1913	3	1	3	1	—	—		
Joby Godfrey	FW	1919	3	1	3	1	—	—		
Jack Peart	FW	1919	3	0	3	0	—	—		
Archie Roe	FW	1919	3	0	3	0	—	—		
Abe Jones	FW	1920	3	2	3	2	—	—		
William Mumford	FB	1920	3	0	3	0	—	—		
Fred Hawley	HB	1920	3	0	3	0	—	—		
Arthur Phoenix	FW	1923	3	0	3	0	—	—		
Frederick Castle	FW	1926	3	0	3	0	—	—		
Albert Bloxham	FW	1927	3	1	3	1	—	—		
Jim Olney	HB	1936–1937	3	0	3	0	—	—		
Ernie Richardson	FW	1936–1937	3	0	3	0	—	—		
Dave Massart	FW	1946–1947	3	0	3	0	—	—		
Jimmy Cochrane	FW	1953–1954	3	1	3	1	—	—		
Bill Bradbury	FW	1955	3	2	3	2	—	—		
Joe Mullett	HB	1957	3	0	3	0	—	—		
Pat Wright	DF	1959–1962	3	0	3	0	—	—		
Mike Harrison	DF	1971–1972	3	0	3	0	—	—		
Mike O'Grady †	MF	1972	3	0	3	0	England	0		
Andy Needham	FW	1976	3	1	3	1	—	—		
Bruce Rioch †	MF	1978	3	0	3	0	Scotland	0		
Phil Starbuck †	FW	1988	3	0	3	0	—	—		
Leigh Jenkinson †	FW	1993	3	0	3	0	Wales B	—		
Bryan Small †	DF	1994	3	0	3	0	England U21	—		
Mick Bodley †	DF	1995	3	0	3	0	—	—	(Note: Southend United)	
Richard Edghill †	DF	2000	3	0	3	0	England B	—		
Gary Charles †	DF	2000	3	0	3	0	England	0		
Bjørn Otto Bragstad †	DF	2001	3	0	3	0	Norway	0		
Michael Hughes †	MF	2002	3	0	3	0	Northern Ireland	0	(Note: Wimbledon)	
Djimi Traoré †	MF	2009	3	0	3	0	Mali	0		
James Hurst †	DF	2012	3	0	3	0	England U20	—		
Greg Halford †	DF	2015–2016	3	0	3	0	England U20	—	(Note: Rotherham United)	
Liam Walsh †	MF	2017	3	0	3	0	England U18	—		
Lee Myung-jae *	DF	2025–present	3	0	3	0	South Korea	0		
Bill Lewis	FW	1894–1896	2	1	3	2	—	—		
Walter Bunch	FB	1901–1902	2	0	3	0	—	—		
Thomas Jones	FW	1904–1905	2	0	3	0	—	—		
Bill Robertson	GK	1948–1952	2	0	3	0	—	—		
Dave Howitt	DF	1972	2	0	3	0	—	—		
Steve Smith	GK	1975–1978	2	0	3	0	England youth	—		
Tim Carter	GK	1991	2	0	3	0	England youth	—		
James Dyson	DF	1999	2	0	3	0	—	—		
Guy Moussi	MF	2014–2015	2	0	3	0	—	—		
Charlee Adams	MF	2014–2016	2	0	3	0	England C	—		
Geraldo Bajrami	DF	2019	2	0	3	0	Albania U21	—		
Jack Southam	FB	1947–1949	1	0	3	0	—	—		
Simon Rea	DF	1995–1996	1	0	3	0	—	—		
Mathew Birley	MF	2005–2006	1	0	3	0	—	—		
Richard Kingson	GK	2007	1	0	3	0	Ghana	11		
Jay O'Shea	MF	2009	1	0	3	0	Republic of Ireland U21	—		
Walter Rotherham	FW	1881–1882	0	0	3	0	—	—		
Joseph Taylor	FB	1882–1883	0	0	3	0	—	—		
Frederick Barlow	FB	1886–1887	0	0	3	0	—	—		
Ernie Watts	FW	1889	2	0	2	0	—	—		
Albert Evers	HB	1891	2	0	2	0	—	—		
Len Curryer	FW	1892	2	0	2	0	—	—		
Percy Watson	FB	1894	2	0	2	0	—	—		
Tom Watson	GK	1895	2	0	2	0	—	—		
Joe Fall	GK	1895–1896	2	0	2	0	—	—		
Alec Wallace	FW	1897	2	1	2	1	—	—		
Thomas Fletcher	FW	1900–1901	2	0	2	0	—	—		
Charles Harvey	FW	1905–1907	2	0	2	0	—	—		
Ezra Holmes	FW	1907	2	0	2	0	—	—		
George Travers	FW	1907–1908	2	0	2	0	—	—		
Thomas Greer	FW	1911	2	0	2	0	—	—		
Arthur Foster	FW	1913	2	1	2	1	—	—		
Jack Watson	FB	1919	2	0	2	0	—	—		
Alf Wilson	FB	1919	2	0	2	0	—	—		
Len Thompson	FW	1921–1922	2	0	2	0	—	—		
Vincent White	HB	1922	2	0	2	0	—	—		
George Waddell	HB	1922	2	0	2	0	—	—		
Harry Deacon	FW	1922	2	0	2	0	—	—		
Arthur Samson	GK	1923	2	0	2	0	—	—		
Tom Devlin	FW	1924–1925	2	1	2	1	—	—		
Alfred Sabin	HB	1930	2	0	2	0	—	—		
Harry Lane	FW	1930–1931	2	0	2	0	—	—		
Sid Wallington	HB	1932	2	0	2	0	—	—		
Len Evans	GK	1933	2	0	2	0	Wales	1		
Ken Faulkner	FW	1947	2	0	2	0	English Schools	—		
Doug Pimbley	FW	1947	2	0	2	0	—	—		
Tony Blake	FB	1950	2	0	2	0	—	—		
John Metcalfe	FW	1952–1953	2	0	2	0	—	—		
Terry Twell	GK	1967	2	0	2	0	—	—		
Ian Smith	FW	1975	2	0	2	0	—	—		
Roy McDonough	FW	1977	2	1	2	1	—	—		
Terry Goode	MF	1981	2	0	2	0	—	—		
Duncan MacDowall	FW	1982	2	0	2	0	—	—		
John Linford †	FW	1984	2	0	2	0	—	—	(Note: Ipswich Town)	
Billy Ronson †	MF	1985	2	0	2	0	—	—	(Note: Barnsley)	
David Howell	DF	1994	2	0	2	0	England C	—		
Marco Gabbiadini †	FW	1996	2	0	2	0	England B	—		
Michael Carrick †	MF	2000	2	0	2	0	England	0		
Stuart Campbell †	MF	2000	2	0	2	0	Scotland U21	—		
Salif Diao †	MF	2005	2	0	2	0	Senegal	0		
Borja Oubiña †	MF	2007	2	0	2	0	Spain	0	(Note: Celta Vigo)	
Papa Bouba Diop	MF	2012	2	1	2	1	Senegal	0		
Dariusz Dudka	MF	2013	2	0	2	0	Poland	0		
Denny Johnstone	FW	2014	2	0	2	0	Scotland U19	—		
Rhoys Wiggins †	DF	2016	2	0	2	0	Wales U21	—	(Note: AFC Bournemouth)	
James Bye	HB	1939	1	0	2	0	—	—		
Andy Harris	U	1989–1991	1	0	2	0	—	—		
John Cheesewright	GK	1991	1	0	2	0	—	—		
Paul Jones	MF	1991	1	0	2	0	—	—		
Eric Hogan	FW	1991–1992	1	0	2	0	—	—		
Trevor Morgan	U	1993	1	0	2	0	—	—		
Keith Downing	MF	1993	1	0	2	0	—	—		
Paul Sansome †	GK	1996	1	0	2	0	—	—		
Ferdinand Coly †	DF	2003	1	0	2	0	Senegal	6	(Note: Lens)	
Luciano Figueroa	FW	2003	1	0	2	0	Argentina	0		
Ben Gordon †	DF	2012	1	0	2	0	England U20	—		
Shane Lowry	DF	2015–2016	1	0	2	0	Australia squad; Republic of Ireland U21	—		
Agus Medina	MF	2019	1	0	2	0	—	—		
Adan George	FW	2020	1	0	2	0	—	—		
Keyendrah Simmonds	MF	2021	1	0	2	0	Saint Kitts and Nevis	—		
Mitch Roberts	DF	2021	1	0	2	0	—	—		
Jack Bodenham	GK	1881	0	0	2	0	—	—		
Lawrence Summers	FB	1881	0	0	2	0	—	—		
Victor Teychenne	HB / FW	1881	0	0	2	0	—	—		
James Whitehead	FW	1881	0	0	2	0	—	—		
Walter Green	FW	1882	0	0	2	0	—	—		
Thomas Morgan	HB	1882	0	0	2	0	—	—		
Archie Vale	GK	1882	0	0	2	0	—	—		
Harry Clayton	FW	1883	0	0	2	0	—	—		
Richard Adams	FW	1887	0	0	2	0	—	—		
Walter Dixon	FW	1887	0	0	2	2	—	—		
Austin Smith	FW	1887	0	0	2	2	—	—		
Sidney King	GK	1946	0	0	2	0	—	—		
Trevor Wolstenholme	U	1962	0	0	2	1	—	—		
Giovanny Espinoza	DF	2009	0	0	2	0	Ecuador	3		
Enric Vallès	MF	2010	0	0	2	0	—	—		
Andrés Prieto	GK	2020–2021	0	0	2	0	—	—		
Archibald Barton	FB	1889	1	0	1	0	—	—		
Edward Clarke	FB	1890	1	0	1	0	—	—		
Jack Hughes	HB	1890	1	0	1	0	—	—		
Arthur Turner	FW	1890	1	0	1	0	—	—		
James Wollaston	HB	1891	1	0	1	0	—	—		
Edward Burton	FW	1891	1	0	1	0	—	—		
Wilbert Harrison	FW	1892	1	2	1	2	—	—		
William Kendrick	HB	1892	1	0	1	0	—	—		
Josiah Roberts	FB	1892	1	0	1	0	—	—		
Edward Brueton	GK	1894	1	0	1	0	—	—		
Ernie Moore	FB	1894	1	0	1	0	—	—		
Tilson Pritchard	FB	1895	1	0	1	0	—	—		
James Deeley	FW	1896	1	0	1	0	—	—		
Lewis Vaughan Lodge	FB	1896	1	0	1	0	England	0		
John Logan	FW	1896	1	0	1	0	—	—		
Harry Williams	FB	1897	1	0	1	0	—	—		
Jack Price	FW	1899	1	0	1	0	—	—		
Sam Bayley	FW	1899	1	1	1	1	—	—		
Samuel Cole	FW	1900	1	0	1	0	—	—		
Willie Wragg	FB	1901	1	0	1	0	—	—		
Jimmy Murray	FW	1901	1	1	1	1	—	—		
Thomas Thompson	FW	1903	1	0	1	0	—	—		
Alfred Sellman	HB	1905	1	0	1	0	—	—		
Jack Shufflebotham	HB	1906	1	0	1	0	—	—		
Arthur Hallworth	HB	1906	1	0	1	0	—	—		
Conyers Kirby	FW	1906	1	0	1	0	—	—		
John Higgins	FW	1907	1	0	1	0	—	—		
Charles Jones	FW	1909	1	0	1	0	—	—		
Fred Kerns	FW	1909	1	0	1	0	—	—		
Frederick Banks	FW	1909	1	0	1	0	—	—		
William McCourty	HB	1909	1	0	1	0	—	—		
Billy George	GK	1911	1	0	1	0	England	0		
Arthur Green	FB	1911	1	0	1	0	—	—		
Ian Hastie	FW	1911	1	0	1	0	—	—		
Horace Thompson	FW	1923	1	0	1	0	—	—		
Jock Morgan	HB	1924	1	0	1	0	—	—		
Albert Sykes	HB	1925	1	0	1	0	—	—		
Frank Bowden	FW	1925	1	0	1	0	—	—		
Ron Stainton	FB	1927	1	0	1	0	—	—		
Harry Isherwood	FB	1927	1	0	1	0	—	—		
Alf Oakes	FW	1927	1	0	1	0	—	—		
Edmund Wood	HB	1927	1	0	1	0	—	—		
Joe Birch	FB	1928	1	0	1	0	—	—		
Harold Riley	FW	1929	1	0	1	0	—	—		
George Smithies	FW	1931	1	0	1	0	England amateur	—		
Jack Morfitt	FW	1931	1	0	1	0	—	—		
Harry Holmes	FW	1934	1	0	1	0	—	—		
Fred Jones	FW	1934	1	0	1	0	—	—	(Note: Matthews attributes Jones's only first-team appearance, against Stoke City on 1 September 1934, to Wilson Jones, who had not yet joined the club.)	
Samuel Bellamy	FB	1937	1	0	1	0	—	—		
Harry Parr	HB	1938	1	0	1	0	—	—		
Ray Devey	HB	1946	1	0	1	0	—	—		
Willie Havenga	FW	1949	1	0	1	0	—	—		
Hymie Kloner	HB	1950	1	0	1	0	South Africa	0		
Barrie Squires	FW	1954	1	0	1	0	—	—		
Dennis Harper	FW	1957	1	0	1	0	—	—		
Mick Farmer	MF	1964	1	1	1	1	—	—		
Geoff Anderson	FW	1964	1	0	1	0	—	—		
Len Beel	GK	1965	1	0	1	0	—	—		
Malcolm Briggs	FW	1979	1	0	1	0	—	—		
Dave Linney	MF	1982	1	0	1	0	—	—		
Mark Kendall	GK	1984	1	0	1	0	England youth	—		
Jim McDonagh †	GK	1984	1	0	1	0	Republic of Ireland; England youth	0		
Lee Jenkins	MF	1985	1	0	1	0	England youth	—		
Paul Hart	DF	1987	1	0	1	0	—	—		
Neil Sproston	FW	1987	1	0	1	0	—	—		
Gary O'Reilly †	DF	1991	1	0	1	0	Republic of Ireland youth; English Schools	—		
Dan Sahlin †	FW	1995	1	0	1	0	Sweden	0	(Note: Hammarby)	
Matthew Webb	MF	1995	1	0	1	0	—	—		
Fred Barber	GK	1996	1	0	1	0	—	—		
John Beresford †	DF	1999	1	0	1	0	England B	—		
Jimmy Haarhoff	MF	1999	1	0	1	0	Northern Ireland U18	—		
Carl Tiler †	DF	2001	1	0	1	0	England U21	—	(Note: Charlton Athletic)	
Andy Marriott	GK	2003	1	0	1	0	Wales; England U21	0		
Piotr Świerczewski †	MF	2003	1	0	1	0	Poland	2	(Note: Marseille)	
Andrew Barrowman	FW	2004	1	0	1	0	Scotland U19	—		
Jared Wilson	DF	2008	1	0	1	0	—	—		
Ulises de la Cruz	DF	2009	1	0	1	0	Ecuador	0		
Amari'i Bell	DF	2014	1	0	1	0	Jamaica	0		
Corey O'Keeffe	DF	2016	1	0	1	0	Republic of Ireland U19	—		
Ryan Burke	DF	2020	1	0	1	0	Republic of Ireland U16	—		
Miguel Fernández	FW	2020	1	0	1	0	—	—		
Joseph Tatton	HB	1881	0	0	1	0	—	—		
Ezekiel Kingston	FW	1882	0	0	1	0	—	—		
Edward Bailey	FB	1882	0	0	1	0	—	—		
Edward Clarke	GK	1884	0	0	1	0	—	—		
Walter Willetts	FW	1884	0	0	1	0	—	—		
Bill Jones	FB	1885	0	0	1	0	—	—		
James Lovesey	FB	1886	0	0	1	0	—	—		
Jack Price	HB	1886	0	0	1	1	—	—		
Wilson Stanley	FW	1886	0	0	1	0	—	—		
Walter Farley	HB	1887	0	0	1	0	—	—		
George Dixon	FB	1887	0	0	1	0	—	—		
Fred Pentland	FW	1902	0	0	1	0	England	0		
Jack Bird	HB	1905	0	0	1	0	—	—		
Richie Blackmore	GK	1973	0	0	1	0	—	—		
Gary Allen	FW	1974	0	0	1	0	—	—		
Ian Brown	MF	1985	0	0	1	0	—	—		
Tony Elliott	GK	1988	0	0	1	0	England youth	—		
Adam Wratten	DF	1993	0	0	1	2	—	—		
Rui Esteves †	MF	1995	0	0	1	0	—	—	(Note: Benfica)	
Ryan Price	GK	1995	0	0	1	0	England semi-pro	—		
Richard Knight	GK	1999	0	0	1	0	—	—		
Peter Till	MF	2005	0	0	1	0	—	—		
Sam Oji	DF	2006	0	0	1	0	—	—		
Sone Aluko	MF	2007	0	0	1	0	Nigeria; England U19	0		
Robin Shroot	MF	2009	0	0	1	0	Northern Ireland U21	—		
Dan Preston	DF	2009	0	0	1	0	—	—		
Ashley Sammons	MF	2009	0	0	1	0	England U17	—		
Akwasi Asante	FW	2011	0	0	1	0	—	—		
Eddy Gnahoré	FW	2012	0	0	1	0	France U18	—		
David Lucas	GK	2012	0	0	1	0	England U20	—		
Reece Hales	FW	2013	0	0	1	0	—	—		
Gavin Gunning	DF	2014	0	0	1	0	Republic of Ireland U21	—		
Dan Scarr	DF	2018	0	0	1	0	—	—		
Jack Concannon	MF	2020	0	0	1	0	—	—		
Zaid Betteka	FW	2025–present	0	0	1	0	—	—		

== Footnotes ==
Player statistics include games played while on loan from clubs listed below. Unless individually sourced, loaning clubs come from the appearances source or from "Birmingham City: 1946/47–2013/14". Post War English & Scottish Football League A–Z Players Database. Neil Brown. Archived from the original on 9 June 2019.

== Sources ==
- Matthews, Tony (1995). Birmingham City: A Complete Record. Derby: Breedon Books. ISBN 978-1-85983-010-9.
- Matthews, Tony (2000). The Encyclopedia of Birmingham City Football Club 1875–2000. Cradley Heath: Britespot. ISBN 978-0-9539288-0-4.
- Matthews, Tony (2010). Birmingham City: The Complete Record. Derby: Derby Books. ISBN 978-1-85983-853-2.
- Rollin, Glenda; Rollin, Jack, eds. (2010). Sky Sports Football Yearbook 2010–2011. Headline. ISBN 978-0-7553-6107-6.
- "Birmingham City". Soccerbase. Centurycomm.
