= 1894–95 Small Heath F.C. season =

Small Heath F.C.
1894–95 season
- Chairman: Walter W. Hart
- Secretary: Alfred Jones
- Ground: Coventry Road
- Football League First Division: 12th (of 16)
- FA Cup: First round proper (eliminated by West Bromwich Albion)
- Birmingham Senior Cup: Semi-final (eliminated by West Bromwich Albion)
- Birmingham Charity Cup: Runners-up (eliminated by Aston Villa)
- Top goalscorer: League: Frank Mobley (13); All: Frank Mobley (13)
- Highest home attendance: 15,000 vs Sunderland (9 February 1895)
- Lowest home attendance: 3,000 (three matches)
Team colours

The 1894–95 English football season was Small Heath F.C.'s 14th season of competitive association football and third season in the Football League. In 1893–94, Small Heath, based in Birmingham, finished in second place in the divisional championship and gained promotion by defeating Darwen 3–1 in a test match. The club had struggled financially during the season, and there were suggestions that it might have disbanded had promotion not been secured. In their first season in the First Division, they finished in 12th place in the 16-team division, thus avoiding the possibility of relegation via the test matches.

Small Heath entered the 1894–95 FA Cup at the first round proper, and for the second consecutive year lost in that round to the eventual losing finalists, who this season were West Bromwich Albion. In local competitions, they were eliminated in the semi-final of the Birmingham Senior Cup, also by West Bromwich Albion, and lost to Aston Villa in the final of the Mayor of Birmingham's Charity Cup. The committee opted not to compete in the United Counties League, a supplementary competition.

Twenty-one different players represented the club in nationally organised competitive matches during the season and there were nine different goalscorers. Two players, Bill Purves and – for the third consecutive season – Billy Ollis, appeared in every League match, and none of the first-choice eleven missed more than four League matches. The top scorer, for the second year running, was inside-forward Frank Mobley with 13 goals. The match against Sunderland attracted a crowd estimated at 15,000, around double the highest attendance from previous years.

== Background ==
Having won the inaugural Second Division title in 1892–93 but missed out on promotion via the test match system, in 1893–94 they finished second in the division and were promoted to the First Division by defeating Darwen 3–1 in the test match. The club had been in financial difficulty during the season, and the Birmingham Daily Post speculated that failure in the test match "would in all probability have meant the disbanding of the club". The accounts showed income of £1,816 and expenditure of £2,039, a deficit of £222 on the year. Nevertheless, in preparation for the new season, the club began work on a grandstand and relaid the pitch.

All the regular first-choice players signed on again for the new campaign, apart from goalkeeper George Hollis. Of the less regular team members, Bernard Pumfrey left for Midland League club Gainsborough Trinity, William Reynolds and Gilbert Smith were released to join Birmingham & District League club Berwick Rangers, and Chris Charsley retired from League football to concentrate on his police career. Small Heath signed the former Sunderland full back Jack Oliver, whom they had failed to recruit earlier in the season, and forward Charlie Letherbarrow from Walsall, but those were the only major signings. The squad was boosted by players from local football, who included Alec Leake, Bill Lewis and a young Billy Pratt. Alfred Jones continued as secretary-manager, and Caesar Jenkyns retained the captaincy. There were no changes to the team's kit of light blue shirts with navy collar trim, cuffs and pocket, white knickerbockers and navy socks.

== Review ==
=== September–October ===
Small Heath's First Division campaign began on Saturday 1 September with a visit to local rivals and League champions Aston Villa, which turned out rather closer than predicted. Jack Hallam opened the scoring from a Tommy Hands cross with the first League goal of the season, "for the match was started punctually, and it would have been a sheer impossibility to score faster than the Small Heath player did." Villa equalised some 20 minutes later, took the lead immediately afterwards, and retained that lead to the end. The Birmingham Daily Post picked out Hallam and Caesar Jenkyns for praise, was disappointed by Fred Wheldon, "usually the bright particular star of the front rank", and suggested that Jack Oliver would be a success "when he has lost a little superfluous flesh".

On the Sunday, Jenkyns was involved in an incident after he and an acquaintance staked a quart of beer on a bicycle race. Solihull Police Court later heard how, after Jenkyns lost the race, he knocked his opponent off his bicycle, hit another man, and returned to the public house where he struck a third man in the face. He was convicted on three counts of assault, and fined 20s plus costs on each count. In the following day's visit to Everton, Small Heath had Oliver and Charles Partridge to thank for the score being restricted to 5–0.

The new grandstand was open for the first home match of the season, against Bolton Wanderers, and those spectators not distracted by the visit to the city of the Duke and Duchess of York (the future George V and Queen Mary) saw a much improved performance from the forwards that produced a 2–1 win with goals from Frank Mobley and Wheldon. The visit to Wolverhampton Wanderers ended in defeat by the same score. Oliver conceded a penalty kick for a foul on Charlie Reynolds, Wheldon equalised before half-time, and Wolverhampton regained the lead straight after the interval.

"The surprise of Saturday's football" came when a late goal from Hands was enough to beat Preston North End, though there was a suggestion in the press that the team would do well to moderate their tactics, which "were not of the gentlest". For Preston's visit to Coventry Road the following weekend, the club applied for a licence to sell alcohol within the ground, as it was the only First Division club without such a licence. The application was refused, the licensing magistrate "remarking that if the public wanted drink they could go outside to get it."

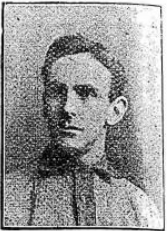
Beneficiary Fred Wheldon

The Leicester Chronicle suspected that "it will be a long time, perhaps, before we have another match so keenly contested". The visitors scored early on, but Small Heath's shoot-on-sight policy produced goals for Hands, after a clash with Mobley left Preston goalkeeper James Trainer on the floor, and for Wheldon, before Edward Brueton, deputising in goal for the injured Partridge, let in a soft goal just before half-time. The second half brought "more finesse and less vigour" from the home side, but Preston grew stronger, took the lead, and Small Heath "appeared to be done with". Then Trainer could only turn Mobley's lob in off the post, the same player gave his side the lead, but "before the Small Heath contingent had finished congratulating one another", "North End charging down the field finely from the centre kick scored again before the whistle sounded" to make the final score 4–4. Match receipts totalled nearly £250, a ground record.

After Wolverhampton Wanderers took a three-goal lead at Coventry Road, the Daily Post suggested that Caesar Jenkyns must have spent the interval "exhorting his men to make a famous effort", for "they responded nobly to his appeal". Adopting a strategy of all-out attack, running the ball upfield at full speed before crossing to as many of the forwards as could converge on goal, they scored four times in 25 minutes to demoralise the opposition and win the match. The quality of Hands' movement and crosses was singled out for particular praise. Small Heath then played West Bromwich Albion in a benefit match for Fred Wheldon, who had first played for the club on trial in 1890, and since signing, before the 1890–91 season, had not missed a game in League or FA Cup. Hands and triallist goalkeeper Charlie Williams of Swindon Town were injured during the game, and unfortunately for the beneficiary, only 2,000 spectators turned up.

A creditable performance in a losing cause at Burnley, marred only by the forwards' lack of composure in front of goal, was followed by the visit of Aston Villa. Bob Gordon scored early, but thereafter was marked out of the game by Jenkyns. Villa had the better of the first half but Wheldon tied the scores from a penalty kick just before half-time; just after, the home side took the lead with "a determined and characteristic rush", but Dennis Hodgetts equalised, again from a penalty. The defences, Partridge and Jenkyns for Small Heath and the Villa backs in particular, had the best of the remaining time, and the match was drawn. After only four games, gate receipts, including the £450 paid by that day's 14,600 spectators, already amounted to half that of the preceding season. Small Heath finished October with a 2–2 draw on a waterlogged pitch at Stoke which left them in ninth place in the League.

=== November–December ===
Three goals behind in the first 20 minutes, Small Heath had fought back to level terms when a powerful shot from Everton's Alex Latta was given as a goal, despite having gone well wide, the referee believing it had passed through a hole in the net. William McGregor, former president of the League, suggested that it "was the worst decision he had seen since the establishment of the goal-nets", and Latta himself agreed that the ball had gone wide. The crowd were unimpressed – "ironical shouts of 'Goal' were the reception of any shots by Everton, of good or bad quality, that followed" – until with ten minutes left, Jenkyns tied the scores with a header from a free kick. While confirming that the result had to stand, the League appointed a committee to look into the circumstances of the phantom goal, and issued an instruction to referees to "inspect and observe the condition" of goalnets before each match in the future.

In contrast, Small Heath put on "a very indifferent display" in losing 4–1 at West Bromwich Albion. They scored twice, very much against the run of play, to come back from 2–0 down to beat Stoke 4–2, and their good fortune continued at Bolton Wanderers. The home goalscorer, Alex Paton, left the field injured before half-time, goalkeeper John Willie Sutcliffe was insistent that Jack Hallam's equaliser had been punched into the goal – Hallam was equally insistent that it had not – and after Wheldon scored Small Heath's winner, the referee ended the game a few minutes early. Bolton applied to the League for the match to be replayed because of the short time – the referee admitted to having ended the game 2½ minutes early, though not the 5 alleged by Bolton – but the result stood.

Unusually, Small Heath led at half-time at home to Sheffield United. Charlie Letherbarrow, in only his second appearance for the club, scored after ten minutes and again approaching the interval to regain the lead. Between the two legitimate scores, he hit a swerving shot which looped up off the chest of goalkeeper William Foulke and into the net, but the referee judged that the ball had been played in from behind the goal-line. In the second half, Wheldon converted a penalty kick when Foulke pushed Hallam out of the way as he attempted to reach a cross from Tommy Hands, and Letherbarrow completed his hat-trick as Small Heath won 4–1. Jack Oliver received a good reception when he returned to his former club – Small Heath were introduced as "Oliver's team" – but Sunderland took no pity, winning 7–1. At Liverpool, an exciting game produced a 3–1 defeat. The three home forwards worked as one, putting extra pressure on the centre of the visiting midfield, and the defence was unable to hold them out. The game was rough at times, Liverpool's Joe McQue attracting particular attention because of an incident in the corresponding match the previous season when Caesar Jenkyns was sent off for his violent reaction to McQue kicking Frank Mobley in the abdomen.

Playing a close-passing game that made them better able to cope with the high winds and blizzards that had caused the postponement of several League matches, Nottingham Forest earned themselves a Christmas bonus of 10s a man for inflicting Small Heath's first home defeat of the season. Boxing Day produced a 2–0 defeat to a Sheffield Wednesday team playing a better all-round game, and the next day, Small Heath beat a touring Scottish Borderers side 11–1. Injury deprived Small Heath of four regular first-team players for the last game of the year, at home to Liverpool, and both Tilson Pritchard and Ernie Moore made their debuts at full-back. Jenkyns moved back to play behind the other half-backs to protect the understandably nervous reserves, and once the nerves wore off, Pritchard in particular "could scarcely be improved upon." Mobley opened the scoring in the first half, and with the wind behind them in the second half, Small Heath won 3–0 to go into the new year in 10th place in the League.

=== January–February ===
On a hard pitch in very cold weather, Small Heath had already conceded twice at Blackburn Rovers before Billy Ollis was injured midway through the first half and played no further part. The visitors put up a fight, but the numerical disadvantage was too much for them and the final score of 9–1 remains the club's joint-record losing margin. With no competitive fixture scheduled for the next two weeks, the club undertook a tour. Their opening match, in Plymouth, was the first visit of a professional club to the south-west of England. The Home Park club had ambitions to bring professional league football to the region, and in front of a crowd of 4,000 their team performed well before conceding three second-half goals. Small Heath's tour ended with a 2–1 defeat at Manchester City, and they returned to a celebratory dinner in honour of the club's promotion to the First Division. The chairman presented medals to the players, congratulated them on their showing thus far, and proposed a toast to their health, in the hope that a full-strength team might be available by the next League match in ten days time.

In a "remarkable encounter", Burton Swifts led 3–2 at half-time in the Birmingham Senior Cup first round. Their second goal was something of a freak, as an errant clearance by Purves was met on the volley and returned into the net by Davie Willocks. Swifts took a two-goal lead for a third time before Small Heath drew level, after which they "pressed hotly, but were kept out until twenty seconds from the finish, and when extra time seemed inevitable, Walton headed the ball through amidst great cheering" and the referee blew the final whistle.

A visit to the Brine Baths at Droitwich Spa failed to help the players adjust to Nottingham Forest's pitch, which had been flooded when the River Trent burst its banks a few days before. They conceded two early goals, but "kept up a strong pressure" thereafter, and the Birmingham Daily Post suggested that "the forwards played magnificently, and had the half-backs supported them a little more efficiently they might have broken down even the stalwart defence" of the home club. The Nottinghamshire Guardian had predicted that Forest "should have but little difficulty in disposing of Small Heath", but later admitted that the latter "gave the Forest a far better game than had generally been anticipated."

February opened with the FA Cup tie at home to West Bromwich Albion. Albion scored first, charging both ball and goalkeeper into the net, and doubled their lead after a misunderstanding between Oliver and Jenkyns. Half an hour into the game, Wheldon made a "characteristic" dribble, his shot was parried and Walton scored from the rebound. The pitch was very muddy, but the Small Heath forwards persisted with a close-passing game when "a kick and a rush would have served better", and although "the Birmingham enthusiasts nearly shouted themselves hoarse in encouraging the Heathens", there were no more goals. A collection was taken at the match for the families of the 77 miners killed in flooding at the Diglake Colliery, at Audley, Staffordshire.

Joe Fountain made his debut against Sunderland as a late replacement for Wheldon, whose sister had died on the morning of the match. On a slippery pitch "thickly strewn with chaff and hayseeds", Small Heath fell a goal behind in a first half dominated by the defences of both teams. The special training undertaken by the home side in preparation for the match took effect, as "in the closing stages they looked winners all over", and Sunderland had goalkeeper Ned Doig to thank for restricting the scoring to just Tommy Hands' equaliser. The attendance of 15,000 was nearly double the highest recorded in previous seasons.

Both clubs having been eliminated from the FA Cup, Small Heath arranged a friendly with Notts County, refereed by the Test cricketer and former England international footballer Billy Gunn, which gave them an opportunity to try out reserve players Jack Jones and Alec Leake. On a hard, snow-covered pitch, Billy Walton scored all three goals in a 3–3 draw, but the attendance of under a thousand, though understandable because of the weather conditions, was disappointing. Jones made his competitive debut, standing in for the injured Hallam, as Small Heath again struggled in muddy conditions and, for the fourth time this season, lost to West Bromwich Albion.

Reserve Tom Watson replaced Partridge in goal and Hallam returned to the forward line for the second round of the Birmingham Cup, at home to Wolverhampton Wanderers. Wheldon scored with two minutes left to take the lead, but the Wanderers still had time to tie the scores at 3–3. After consulting both captains, the referee ordered half-an-hour's extra time, but Wanderers, whose players had already returned to the dressing rooms, refused to play, so Jenkyns claimed the game for Small Heath.

=== March–April ===
After seven defeats in the last nine League matches, Small Heath did little in the draw with Blackburn Rovers to allay the prospect of the relegation test matches. Numerous chances were wasted. According to the Birmingham Daily Post, "not one of the forwards seemed capable of administering a sharp kick", and "have themselves to blame for not securing a victory". With five matches remaining, they were in 11th position in the League, but only two points clear of the test match zone.

On a lighter note, the annual theatrical sports, hosted in conjunction with the Prince of Wales Theatre, featured a fancy-dress procession from the city centre to the Coventry Road ground for athletic events including sprint and 440-yard (400 m) races for the footballers (won by Caesar Jenkyns and Teddy Jolly respectively), a skipping race for the ladies of the theatre, sack race (won by Harry Lupino) and egg-and-spoon race open to all, and a handicap race for the members of the orchestra – the handicap being that they had to carry their instruments. The entertainment finished with a football match between Small Heath F.C. and a theatre XI, refereed by music hall artiste Vesta Tilley. Despite the cold wind and intermittent snow, the event attracted 8,000 spectators and raised £100 for each of three local hospitals.

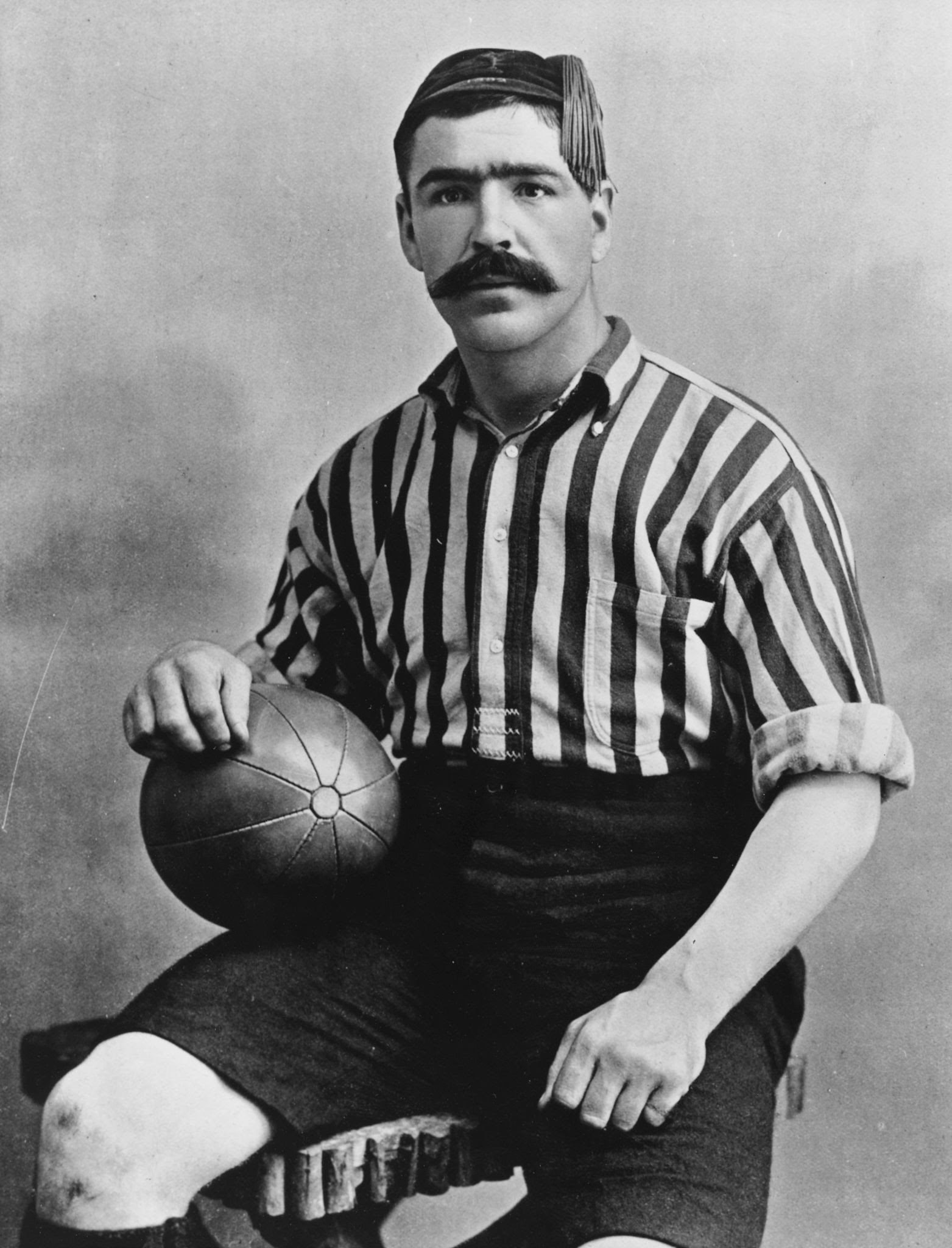
Caesar Jenkyns

Small Heath withdrew their claim to the Birmingham Cup match, and the Birmingham Association ordered a replay, again at Coventry Road. This time round, Small Heath held on to their 3–2 lead. The League match at home to Sheffield Wednesday was one of several victims of the weather. The referee had initially passed the ground fit for play, but continued heavy rain turned the pitch into a quagmire and forced a late postponement. Derby County took what the local newspaper described as "the last chance the County had of escaping the test matches", scoring three times in the first 15 minutes as they beat Small Heath by five goals to three.

Caesar Jenkyns, who "has been playing so well with Small Heath this season that his selection as centre half was a foregone conclusion", "proved himself clever in tackling the English forwards and often getting the ball from them", as Wales drew with England at Queen's Club. In the semi-final of the Birmingham Cup, a weakened Small Heath team lost to West Bromwich Albion in a rough game. Albion's Tom Hutchinson was accompanied off the field by a policeman when sent off for injuring Charles Partridge, and during extra time, Charlie Perry was carried off with a leg injury.

The players went to Malvern for special training before the home game with Burnley. Joe Fountain was an "excellent" stand-in for the injured Tommy Hands at outside left and Jenkyns was "a tower of strength" as Wheldon scored the only goal of a scrappy game to bring Small Heath's points total to 22 with three matches left. The Daily Post predicted that 24 would be enough to avoid the test matches. On Easter Monday, Hands returned to the team for the last home League match of the season, a goalless draw with Sheffield Wednesday in which both teams had numerous chances to score.

Final First Division table (part)
| Pos | Club | Pld | W | D | L | F | A | Pts |
|---|---|---|---|---|---|---|---|---|
| 11th | Wolverhampton Wanderers | 30 | 9 | 7 | 14 | 43 | 63 | 25 |
| 12th | Small Heath | 30 | 9 | 7 | 14 | 50 | 74 | 25 |
| 13th | West Bromwich Albion | 30 | 10 | 4 | 16 | 51 | 66 | 24 |
Key: Pld = Matches played; W = Matches won; D = Matches drawn; L = Matches lost; F = Goals for; A = Goals against; Pts = Points

At Derby, County took the lead after 17 minutes when an attempted clearance by Jenkyns was turned into his own net, and increased it to 4–0 in the second half before Frank Mobley broke away to score a late consolation. As the players were leaving the field, they were verbally abused by a section of the crowd, who believed the play had been unnecessarily rough. Jenkyns, who appeared to be singled out for particular abuse, grabbed one of the spectators by the throat. Other players separated the pair, and the police became involved. After an investigation, the club committee decided to suspend Jenkyns for the rest of the season, and release him thereafter. The Dart suggested that "the supporters of this club praise the executive for their maintenance of discipline and decorum". Jack Oliver took over the captaincy and Teddy Jolly played at centre-half for the Birmingham Charity Cup semi-final, in which Small Heath finally beat West Bromwich Albion at the sixth attempt.

In their last game of the League season, away to Sheffield United, Small Heath scored first when Foulkes' attempted clearance rebounded off his teammate Walter Hill into the net, and Mobley extended the lead after a break down the left by Hands. Although United came close to scoring from a second-half scrimmage when the ball appeared to cross the line, Small Heath held on to ensure their First Division survival with an unexpected victory.

After overturning a two-goal deficit to beat Woolwich Arsenal 4–3 in a friendly at Plumstead, Small Heath took on Aston Villa in their last match of the season, the final of the Birmingham Charity Cup. Unfortunately for the charities, the weather was poor and the attendance low, but those spectators present saw an exciting game. Wheldon scored first with a fierce shot that entered the net off the goalkeeper and the underside of the bar, then Bob Chatt equalised from a free kick and Charlie Athersmith outpaced Oliver and his parried shot was forced over the line. Mobley tied the scores with a long shot, but in the second half with the wind behind them, Villa scored three times to Jack Hallam's one to take the match 5–3.

== Summary and aftermath ==
Small Heath conceded more goals than any other team in the division, but finished 12th of 16, thus avoiding the risk of relegation via the test matches. Despite the misgivings of the Daily Post that "it cannot be expected that eleven or twelve men will stand the strain of a season's work amongst the first division clubs", no member of the first-choice team missed more than four League matches. Bill Purves and Billy Ollis were ever-present, Ollis for the third season running, and Fred Wheldon missed a match for the first time in five years. Ten other men appeared at least once. Frank Mobley was leading scorer, with 13 goals, followed by Wheldon with 11; no other player reached double figures.

Apart from Caesar Jenkyns, who signed for Woolwich Arsenal where he was appointed captain, all the regular first-team players remained with the club. Goalkeeper Joe Fall signed from Newton Heath for a fee reported as £20, and defender Harry Haynes joined from Wolverhampton Wanderers. The Dart thought that Jenkyns would be missed "a great deal more than some of [the] supporters imagine", and that apart from Fall, who was expected to be "a big improvement" on Partridge, the 1895–96 team would be noticeably weaker than that of the season just ended.

== Match details ==
For consistency, attendances and goalscorers' names in the League and FA Cup match details tables are sourced from Matthews' Complete Record. Information in contemporary newspaper reports could, and often did, differ. League positions are sourced from 11v11.com.

=== Football League First Division ===
Match results: Second Division
| Date | League position | Opponents | Venue | Result | Score F–A | Scorers | Attendance |
|---|---|---|---|---|---|---|---|
| 1 September 1894 | 11th | Aston Villa | A | L | 1–2 | Hands | 20,000 |
| 3 September 1894 | 15th | Everton | A | L | 0–5 | | 8,000 |
| 8 September 1894 | 10th | Bolton Wanderers | H | W | 2–0 | Wheldon 2 | 5,000 |
| 15 September 1894 | 13th | Wolverhampton Wanderers | A | L | 1–2 | Wheldon | 4,000 |
| 22 September 1894 | 10th | Preston North End | A | W | 1–0 | Hands | 5,000 |
| 29 September 1894 | 10th | Preston North End | H | D | 4–4 | Hands, Wheldon, Mobley 2 | 4,000 |
| 6 October 1894 | 7th | Wolverhampton Wanderers | H | W | 4–3 | Walton 2, Mobley, Wheldon | 5,000 |
| 13 October 1894 | 9th | Burnley | A | L | 1–3 | Mobley | 5,000 |
| 20 October 1894 | 9th | Aston Villa | H | D | 2–2 | Wheldon pen., Hallam | 14,000 |
| 27 October 1894 | 9th | Stoke | A | D | 2–2 | Mobley, Hands | 1,500 |
| 3 November 1894 | 9th | Everton | H | D | 4–4 | Wheldon, Izon, Hallam, Jenkyns | 10,000 |
| 10 November 1894 | 11th | West Bromwich Albion | A | L | 1–4 | Hands | 4,523 |
| 17 November 1894 | 11th | Stoke | H | W | 4–2 | Walton, Hallam, Mobley, Wheldon | 3,000 |
| 24 November 1894 | 9th | Bolton Wanderers | A | W | 2–1 | Hallam, Wheldon | 5,000 |
| 1 December 1894 | 7th | Sheffield United | H | W | 4–2 | Letherbarrow, Wheldon pen. | 5,000 |
| 8 December 1894 | 9th | Sunderland | A | L | 1–7 | Hallam | 6,000 |
| 15 December 1894 | 10th | Liverpool | A | L | 1–3 | Mobley | 7,000 |
| 22 December 1894 | 10th | Nottingham Forest | H | L | 1–2 | Mobley | 3,000 |
| 26 December 1894 | 10th | Sheffield Wednesday | A | L | 0–2 | | 14,000 |
| 29 December 1894 | 10th | Liverpool | H | W | 3–0 | Mobley, Lewis, Walton | 5,000 |
| 5 January 1895 | 10th | Blackburn Rovers | A | L | 1–9 | Walton | 4,000 |
| 26 January 1895 | 12th | Nottingham Forest | A | L | 0–2 | | 5,500 |
| 9 February 1895 | 11th | Sunderland | H | D | 1–1 | Hands | 15,000 |
| 23 February 1895 | 12th | West Bromwich Albion | H | L | 1–2 | Mobley | 8,100 |
| 2 March 1895 | 11th | Blackburn Rovers | H | D | 1–1 | Mobley | 5,000 |
| 16 March 1895 | 11th | Derby County | H | L | 3–5 | Jenkyns, Hallam, Walton | 6,000 |
| 23 March 1895 | 10th | Burnley | H | W | 1–0 | Wheldon | 5,500 |
| 28 March 1895 | 10th | Sheffield Wednesday | H | D | 0–0 | | 3,000 |
| 30 March 1895 | 10th | Derby County | A | L | 1–4 | Mobley | 1,500 |
| 13 April 1895 | 11th | Sheffield United | A | W | 2–0 | W. Hill o.g., Mobley | 5,000 |

=== FA Cup ===
| Round | Date | Opponents | Venue | Result | Score F–A | Scorers | Attendance |
|---|---|---|---|---|---|---|---|
| 1st | 2 February 1895 | West Bromwich Albion | H | L | 1–2 | Walton | 10,203 |

=== Birmingham Senior Cup ===
| Round | Date | Opponents | Venue | Result | Score F–A | Scorers | Attendance | Ref |
|---|---|---|---|---|---|---|---|---|
| 1st | 19 January 1895 | Burton Swifts | H | W | 5–4 | Mobley 2, Not known, Wheldon, Walton | Not known | |
| 2nd | 25 February 1895 | Wolverhampton Wanderers | H | D | 3–3 | Hallam, Mobley, Wheldon | 3,000 | |
| Replay | 6 March 1895 | Wolverhampton Wanderers | H | W | 3–2 | Mobley, Jones, Wheldon | Not known | |
| SF | 18 March 1895 | West Bromwich Albion | Molineux Grounds | L | 2–3 | Not known, Jones | Not known | |

=== Mayor of Birmingham's Charity Cup ===
| Round | Date | Opponents | Venue | Result | Score F–A | Scorers | Attendance | Ref |
|---|---|---|---|---|---|---|---|---|
| SF | 6 April 1895 | West Bromwich Albion | H | W | 4–0 | Not known (4) | Not known | |
| Final | 27 April 1895 | Aston Villa | Aston Lower Grounds | L | 3–5 | Wheldon, Mobley, Hallam | 5,000 | |

=== Other matches ===
| Date | Opponents | Venue | Result | Score F–A | Scorers | Attendance | Notes |
|---|---|---|---|---|---|---|---|
| 8 October 1894 | West Bromwich Albion | H | L | 1–3 | Wheldon | 2,000 | Benefit match for Fred Wheldon |
| 27 December 1894 | Scottish Borderers | H | W | 11–1 | Not known (11) | 1,000 | Friendly match |
| 9 January 1895 | Home Park, Plymouth | A | W | 3–0 | Walton, Lewis, Wheldon | 4,000 | Friendly match |
| 13 January 1895 | Manchester City | A | L | 1–2 | Walton | Not known | Friendly match |
| 16 February 1895 | Notts County | A | D | 3–3 | Walton 3 | < 1,000 | Friendly match |
| 15 April 1895 | Woolwich Arsenal | A | W | 4–3 | Walton, Hallam, Mobley 2 | 7,000 | Friendly match |

== Appearances and goals ==
This table includes appearances and goals in nationally organised competitive matches – the Football League and FA Cup – only.
For a description of the playing positions, see Formation (association football)#2–3–5 (Pyramid).

Players' appearances and goals by competition
| Name | Position | League | | FA Cup | | Total | |
| Name | Position | Apps | Goals | Apps | Goals | Apps | Goals |
|---|---|---|---|---|---|---|---|
| Edward Brueton | Goalkeeper | 1 | 0 | 0 | 0 | 1 | 0 |
| Charles Partridge | Goalkeeper | 27 | 0 | 1 | 0 | 28 | 0 |
| Tom Watson | Goalkeeper | 2 | 0 | 0 | 0 | 2 | 0 |
| Ernie Moore | Full back | 1 | 0 | 0 | 0 | 1 | 0 |
| Jack Oliver | Full back | 28 | 0 | 1 | 0 | 29 | 0 |
| Tilson Pritchard | Full back | 1 | 0 | 0 | 0 | 1 | 0 |
| Bill Purves | Full back | 30 | 0 | 1 | 0 | 31 | 0 |
| Ted Devey | Half back | 26 | 0 | 1 | 0 | 27 | 0 |
| Caesar Jenkyns | Half back | 28 | 2 | 1 | 0 | 29 | 2 |
| Teddy Jolly | Half back | 5 | 0 | 0 | 0 | 5 | 0 |
| Billy Ollis | Half back | 30 | 0 | 1 | 0 | 31 | 0 |
| Joe Fountain | Forward | 2 | 0 | 0 | 0 | 2 | 0 |
| Jack Hallam | Forward | 27 | 6 | 1 | 0 | 28 | 6 |
| Tommy Hands | Forward | 29 | 6 | 1 | 0 | 30 | 6 |
| Charles Izon | Forward | 2 | 1 | 0 | 0 | 2 | 1 |
| Jack Jones | Forward | 1 | 0 | 0 | 0 | 1 | 0 |
| Charlie Letherbarrow | Forward | 5 | 3 | 0 | 0 | 5 | 3 |
| Bill Lewis | Forward | 2 | 1 | 0 | 0 | 2 | 1 |
| Frank Mobley | Forward | 28 | 13 | 1 | 0 | 29 | 13 |
| Billy Walton | Forward | 26 | 6 | 1 | 1 | 27 | 7 |
| Fred Wheldon | Forward | 29 | 11 | 1 | 0 | 30 | 11 |
