= 1962–63 Birmingham City F.C. season =

Birmingham City F.C.
1962–63 season
- Chairman: Harry Morris, Jr
- Manager: Gil Merrick
- Ground: St Andrew's
- Football League First Division: 20th
- FA Cup: Third round (eliminated by Bury)
- Football League Cup: Winners
- Top goalscorer: League: Ken Leek (20); All: Ken Leek (29)
- Highest home attendance: 42,228 vs Aston Villa, 27 October 1962
- Lowest home attendance: 11,293 vs Bury, League Cup semi-final 1st leg, 27 March 1963
- Average home league attendance: 22,559
Home colours

The 1962–63 Football League season was Birmingham City Football Club's 60th in the Football League and their 36th in the First Division. They finished in 20th position in the 22-team division, two points clear of the relegation places. They entered the 1962–63 FA Cup at the third round proper and lost in that round to Bury after a replay. They entered the League Cup at the second round and reached the final, in which they defeated local rivals Aston Villa 3–1 on aggregate score to win the first (and, until 2011, only) major trophy in their history.

Because of the severe winter weather – the so-called "Big Freeze of 1963" – Birmingham played no matches for ten weeks, between 22 December and 2 March. Their third-round FA Cup-tie was played in the first week of March, two months later than the usual date of the first weekend in January.

Twenty-three players made at least one appearance in nationally organised first-team competition, and there were eleven different goalscorers. Half back Terry Hennessey played in 52 of the 53 first-team matches over the season (forwards Ken Leek and Mike Hellawell missed only two), and Leek finished as leading goalscorer with 29 goals, of which 20 were scored in league competition.

== Football League First Division ==
Date	League position	Opponents	Venue	Result	Score F–A	Scorers	Attendance
18 August 1962	22nd	Tottenham Hotspur	A	L	0–3		51,140
21 August 1962	22nd	Arsenal	A	L	0–2		34,004
25 August 1962	20th	Leyton Orient	H	D	2–2	Bullock, Hellawell	23,411
29 August 1962	19th	Arsenal	H	D	2–2	Leek, Lynn pen	27,038
1 September 1962	20th	Manchester United	A	L	0–2		40,618
8 September 1962	21st	Burnley	H	W	5–1	Hellawell 2, Leek, Bloomfield, Bullock	24,463
12 September 1962	21st	West Bromwich Albion	A	L	0–1		25,560
15 September 1962	22nd	Sheffield Wednesday	A	L	0–5		22,255
19 September 1962	22nd	West Bromwich Albion	H	D	0–0		28,660
22 September 1962	18th	Fulham	H	W	4–1	Harris, Leek, Auld, Lynn pen	20,439
29 September 1962	20th	Leicester City	A	L	0–3		22,210
6 October 1962	22nd	West Ham United	A	L	0–5		21,150
13 October 1962	22nd	Manchester City	H	D	2–2	Regan, Stubbs	21,114
24 October 1962	19th	Wolverhampton Wanderers	A	W	2–0	Leek 2	26,226
27 October 1962	17th	Aston Villa	H	W	3–2	Leek 2, Lynn pen	42,228
3 November 1962	13th	Sheffield United	A	W	2–0	Stubbs, Hellawell	19,186
10 November 1962	14th	Nottingham Forest	H	D	2–2	Harris, Leek	22,024
17 November 1962	12th	Ipswich Town	A	W	5–1	Harris 2, Leek 2, Auld	16,775
24 November 1962	15th	Liverpool	H	L	0–2		27,050
1 December 1962	14th	Blackpool	A	D	1–1	Leek	12,955
8 December 1962	15th	Blackburn Rovers	H	D	3–3	Bloomfield, Leek 2	16,108
15 December 1962	16th	Tottenham Hotspur	H	L	0–2		36,623
22 December 1962	15th	Leyton Orient	A	D	2–2	Bloomfield 2	11,646
2 March 1963	18th	Manchester City	A	L	1–2	Harris	28,798
9 March 1963	20th	Wolverhampton Wanderers	H	L	3–4	Auld, Lynn 2 (1 pen)	18,219
16 March 1963	20th	Aston Villa	A	L	0–4		40,400
23 March 1963	21st	Sheffield United	H	L	0–1		18,056
30 March 1963	20th	Sheffield Wednesday	H	D	1–1	Auld pen	12,275
3 April 1963	19th	Bolton Wanderers	H	D	2–2	Leek 2	13,200
6 April 1963	20th	Ipswich Town	H	L	0–1		16,756
13 April 1963	21st	Nottingham Forest	A	W	2–0	Leek 2	15,556
15 April 1963	21st	Everton	A	D	2–2	Bloomfield, Leek	50,122
16 April 1963	21st	Everton	H	L	0–1		29,719
20 April 1963	21st	Blackpool	H	L	3–6	Bloomfield, Leek, Auld	15,396
24 April 1963	21st	Bolton Wanderers	A	D	0–0		12,949
27 April 1963	21st	Blackburn Rovers	A	L	1–6	Auld	9,482
1 May 1963	20th	West Ham United	H	W	3–2	Harris, Auld, Hennessey	14,410
4 May 1963	20th	Fulham	A	D	3–3	Harris, Hellawell, Auld	20,179
8 May 1963	20th	Liverpool	A	L	1–5	Leek	23,684
10 May 1963	20th	Manchester United	H	W	2–1	Bloomfield 2	21,855
14 May 1963	20th	Burnley	A	L	1–3	Bloomfield	14,350
18 May 1963	20th	Leicester City	H	W	3–2	Harris, Auld, Lynn pen	23,971

=== League table (part) ===
Final First Division table (part)
Pos	Club	Pld	W	D	L	F	A	GA	Pts
18th	Bolton Wanderers	42	15	5	22	55	75	0.73	35
19th	Manchester United	42	12	10	20	67	81	0.83	34
20th	Birmingham City	42	10	13	19	63	90	0.70	33
21st	Manchester City	42	10	11	21	58	102	0.57	31
22nd	Leyton Orient	42	6	9	27	37	81	0.46	21
Key	Pos = League position; Pld = Matches played; W = Matches won; D = Matches drawn; L = Matches lost; F = Goals for; A = Goals against; GA = Goal average; Pts = Points								
Source									

== FA Cup ==
Because of the severe winter weather – the so-called "Big Freeze of 1963" – Birmingham played no matches for ten weeks, between 22 December and 2 March. Their opening third-round FA Cup-tie against Bury was postponed 14 times and abandoned once before finally being played two months after the originally scheduled date.

Round	Date	Opponents	Venue	Result	Score F–A	Scorers	Attendance
Third round	5 March 1963	Bury	H	D	3–3	Leek, Harris, Lynn pen	37,913
Third round replay	7 March 1963	Bury	A	L	0–2		16,525

== League Cup ==
The first leg of the final, against Birmingham's near neighbours Aston Villa, was played on 23 May at St Andrew's. Birmingham took the lead when Jimmy Harris fed Bertie Auld who crossed for Ken Leek's powerful shot, but Aston Villa equalised via Bobby Thomson. Seven minutes into the second half, the same combination of players made it 2–1, and after 66 minutes Jimmy Bloomfield "ended an excellent run by scoring from a narrow angle, earning even the applause of Villa players" to give Birmingham a 3–1 lead. The second leg, four days later at Villa Park, was goalless. Former England centre half Trevor Smith marked Thomson out of the game, Birmingham's defensive tactics included repeatedly kicking the ball out for throw-ins, and Aston Villa were unable to break their opponents down.

Round	Date	Opponents	Venue	Result	Score F–A	Scorers	Attendance
Second round	26 September 1962	Doncaster Rovers	H	W	5–0	Leek 2, Bloomfield, Harris, Auld	11,384
Third round	15 October 1962	Barrow	A	D	1–1	Wolstenholme	6,289
Third round replay	29 October 1962	Barrow	H	W	5–1	Harris, Stubbs, Leek, Arrowsmith og	11,765
Fourth round	14 November 1962	Notts County	H	W	3–2	Lynn pen, Harris, Auld	13,187
Fifth round	11 December 1962	Manchester City	H	W	6–0	Lynn 2 (1 pen), Leek, Auld, Leivers og, Sear og	18,012
Semi-final 1st leg	27 March 1963	Bury	H	W	3–2	Bullock, Leek, Auld	11,293
Semi-final 2nd leg	8 April 1963	Bury	A	D	1–1	Leek	9,177
Final 1st leg	23 May 1963	Aston Villa	H	W	3–1	Leek 2, Bloomfield	31,902
Final 2nd leg	27 May 1963	Aston Villa	A	D	0–0		37,949

== Appearances and goals ==
Key to positions: GK – Goalkeeper; FB – Full back; HB – Half back; FW – Forward

Players' appearances and goals by competition
Pos.	Nat.	Name	League		FA Cup		League Cup		Total	
Pos.	Nat.	Name	Apps	Goals	Apps	Goals	Apps	Goals	Apps	Goals
GK	ENG	Johnny Schofield	18	0	0	0	4	0	22	0
GK	ENG	Colin Withers	24	0	2	0	5	0	31	0
FB	WAL	Colin Green	17	0	2	0	3	0	22	0
FB	ENG	Stan Lynn	33	6	2	1	7	3	42	10
FB	ENG	Brian Rushton	9	0	0	0	2	0	11	0
FB	ENG	Brian Sharples	3	0	0	0	1	0	4	0
FB	ENG	Graham Sissons	17	0	0	0	3	0	20	0
HB	ENG	Malcolm Beard	34	0	2	0	7	0	43	0
HB	ENG	Winston Foster	5	0	0	0	1	0	6	0
HB	WAL	Terry Hennessey	42	1	2	0	8	0	52	1
HB	ENG	Trevor Smith	37	0	2	0	7	0	46	0
HB	ENG	Johnny Watts	13	0	0	0	5	0	18	0
FW	SCO	Bertie Auld	36	9	2	0	9	4	47	13
FW	ENG	Jimmy Bloomfield	28	9	2	0	6	2	36	11
FW	ENG	Peter Bullock	14	2	0	0	1	1	15	3
FW	ENG	Greg Farrell	2	0	0	0	0	0	2	0
FW	ENG	Jimmy Harris	29	8	2	1	6	4	37	13
FW	ENG	Mike Hellawell	40	5	2	0	9	0	51	5
FW	WAL	Ken Leek	41	20	2	1	8	8	51	29
FW	ENG	John Regan	2	1	0	0	2	0	4	1
FW	ENG	Robin Stubbs	12	2	0	0	3	1	15	3
FW	ENG	Denis Thwaites	6	0	0	0	0	0	6	0
FW	ENG	Trevor Wolstenholme	0	0	0	0	2	1	2	1

== See also ==
- Birmingham City F.C. seasons
