= Teychenné =

Teychenné is a surname. Notable people with the surname include:

- Gabriella Teychenné, English music conductor
- Michel Teychenné, French politician
- Anais Teychenné, mayor of Sentenac-de-Sérou, France
- Charles Twynam Teychenne, a recipient of the Military Cross (MC) in the 1917 New Year Honours
- Jean-Marie (Jean-Michel?) Teychenne, a cyclist in the 1907 Tour de France
- Kathleen Teychenne, a recipient of the British Empire Medal (BEM) in the 1974 Birthday Honours
- Maree Teychenne, Australian author, scriptwriter for two episodes on the first season of Prisoner, and received an ACT Writing and Publishing Awards
- Mathieu Teychenne, a cyclist in the 2012 Ag2r–La Mondiale season
- V.G. Teychenné, a principal at Perseverance School, Kimberley, South Africa
- Victor Teychenne, a former footballer with Birmingham City F.C.
