= Vincent White =

Vincent White may refer to:

- Vincent White (politician) (1885–1958), Irish politician
- Vincent White (footballer) (1897–1972), English footballer
- Vincent White (American football) (born 1961), American football player
