= Edmund Wood =

Edmund Wood may refer to:

- Edmund Burke Wood (1820–1882), Canadian politician
- Edmund Wood (footballer) (1903–1986), English footballer
- Edmund Wood (British politician), British Member of Parliament, 1924–1929
- Edmund Wood (priest), English-Canadian Anglican priest (1830-1909)
