= Havenga =

Havenga is a surname. Notable people with the surname include:

- Arno Havenga (born 1974), Dutch water polo player and coach
- Nicolaas Havenga (1882–1957), South African politician
- Willie Havenga (1924–2008), South African footballer
- Wynand Havenga (1965–2025), South African darts player
