= Shufflebotham =

Shufflebotham is a surname. Notable people with the name include:

- Ernest Shufflebotham (1908–1984), English-born potter and designer active from the 1930s - 1950s
- Jack Shufflebotham (1885–1954), English professional footballer
- Thomas Shufflebotham (1881–1939), English professional footballer
