= Tom Watson (footballer, born 1860s) =

English footballer (1860s–1902)

Personal information
- Full name: Thomas Watson
- Date of birth: 1868 or 1869
- Place of birth: Birmingham, England
- Date of death: 10 April 1902 (aged 33)
- Place of death: Birmingham, England
- Position: Goalkeeper

Senior career*
Years	Team	Apps	(Gls)
- Yardley Victoria
189?–1895	Small Heath	2	(0)
- Birmingham City Police
- * Club domestic league appearances and goals

Thomas Watson (born 1868 or 1869; died 10 April 1902) was an English footballer who played for Small Heath in the Football League as a goalkeeper.

== Life and career ==
Thomas Watson was born in 1868 or 1869 in Birmingham, He was a son of John Watson, a police constable. Described as "a sturdily-built young fellow", Watson grew up to be an all-round athlete, was actively involved in organising local athletics meetings, and was "an ardent cricketer".

Watson played local football for Yardley Victoria, and made two appearances in the First Division for Small Heath as an amateur in the 1894–95 season. His debut came on 2 March 1895 at home to Blackburn Rovers. When the two teams had met earlier in the season at Ewood Park, with Small Heath's Charles Partridge in goal, Blackburn inflicted what remains the club's record defeat, of 9–1. Watson replaced him for the home fixture on a trial basis, the match was drawn and, according to the Birmingham Daily Gazette's "Observer", he "may be said to have acquitted himself with credit, one shot by [Jimmy] Haydock in the first half being magnificently cleared." In Small Heath's next league match, away to Derby County, he conceded five goals. Partridge returned to the side for the following game; he "played with more confidence than usual, and on three or four occasions he saved really well", and kept his place for the remainder of the season.

Watson joined Birmingham City Police in 1889, and was promoted to the rank of sergeant in 1901. He played for their football team, and often used to police Small Heath's matches. He was married to Jane, and at the time of the 1901 census, the couple, their five young children and Watson's father were living in the Bordesley district of Birmingham. Watson died of pneumonia in The Queen's Hospital, Birmingham, on 10 April 1902 at the age of 33. He was buried with full police honours at Yardley cemetery.

== Sources ==
- Joyce, Michael (2004). Football League Players' Records 1888 to 1939. Nottingham: SoccerData. ISBN 978-1-899468-67-6.
- Matthews, Tony (1995). Birmingham City: A Complete Record. Derby: Breedon Books. ISBN 978-1-85983-010-9.
