= Kevin Ashley =

English footballer

Personal information
- Full name: Kevin Mark Ashley
- Date of birth: 31 December 1968
- Place of birth: Birmingham, England
- Height: 5 ft 7 in (1.70 m)
- Position: Right back

Youth career
- 1984–1986: Birmingham City

Senior career*
Years	Team	Apps	(Gls)
1986–1990	Birmingham City	57	(1)
1990–1994	Wolverhampton Wanderers	88	(1)
1994–1996	Peterborough United	36	(0)
1996	→ Doncaster Rovers (loan)	3	(0)
1996–1998	Telford United	47	(3)
1998–2000	Bromsgrove Rovers		
2000	Paget Rangers	1	(0)
- * Club domestic league appearances and goals

Kevin Mark Ashley (born 31 December 1968) is an English former professional footballer who played as a right back. He made 184 appearances in the Football League, scoring twice.

== Career ==
Ashley was born in Kings Heath, Birmingham. He began his career under the YTS scheme with his local club, Birmingham City, and progressed to the first team, making his debut on 12 April 1987 in a 1–0 defeat to local rivals West Bromwich Albion. He made 66 appearances in all competitions before moving to their Midlands neighbours Wolverhampton Wanderers for £500,000 in September 1990.

He made his Wolves debut as a substitute in a 1–1 draw at West Ham United on 15 September 1990 but had his first season disrupted by injury. He regained his fitness for the following season and was almost ever-present. However, his injury troubles resurfaced and he never played for the club after April 1993. In total, he made 99 appearances for the team.

He was given a free transfer to Peterborough United in August 1994, but was unable to hold down a regular place and spent a spell on loan at Doncaster Rovers in 1996.

He then moved into non-league football, first with Telford United of the Conference, and then with Southern League clubs Bromsgrove Rovers and Paget Rangers, for whom he made one appearance before injury to his knee forced him to give up the game in 2000.
