= John Deakin (footballer) =

English footballer (born 1966)

Personal information
- Full name: John Deakin
- Date of birth: 29 September 1966 (age 60)
- Place of birth: Stocksbridge, West Riding of Yorkshire, England
- Height: 5 ft 8 in (1.73 m)
- Position: Midfielder

Youth career
- 1983–1985: Barnsley

Senior career*
Years	Team	Apps	(Gls)
1985–1987	Doncaster Rovers	23	(0)
1987–1988	Frickley Athletic	?	(?)
1988–1989	Shepshed Charterhouse	?	(?)
1989–1991	Birmingham City	7	(0)
1991	Carlisle United	3	(0)
1991–1992	Wycombe Wanderers	13	(0)
1992–1999	Kidderminster Harriers	184	(12)
1999–2000	Worcester City	?	(3)
2000	→ Evesham United (loan)	?	(?)
2000–2001	Evesham United	?	(?)
- * Club domestic league appearances and goals

John Deakin (born 29 September 1966) is an English former professional footballer who made 33 appearances in the Football League playing for Doncaster Rovers, Birmingham City and Carlisle United.

== Career ==
Deakin was born in Stocksbridge, West Riding of Yorkshire. He began his football career as an apprentice with Barnsley, but first played in the Football League as a non-contracted player with Doncaster Rovers. Two years in non-League football with Frickley Athletic and Shepshed Charterhouse preceded a return to the Football League with Birmingham City in 1989. Deakin, a hard-working midfielder, went straight into the starting eleven, but his Birmingham career was disrupted by injury, and he had a brief spell at Carlisle United before returning to non-league with Wycombe Wanderers. Released at the end of the 1991–92 season, having made 23 appearances for the club, he joined Kidderminster Harriers.

Deakin helped Kidderminster to the Conference title in 1994, though they were not promoted to the Football League because their ground was below standard. He played in their 1993–94 FA Cup run which took them past former club Birmingham City and Preston North End to become only the fourth non-league team to reach the fifth round, in which they lost narrowly to Premier League club West Ham United. Deakin, a substitute in this game, failed to take a chance in stoppage time which would have taken the tie to a replay. The following season Kidderminster and Deakin lost in the final of the FA Trophy to Woking, and two years later they finished as Conference runners-up. Deakin played 42 games in all competitions in the 1998–99 season, his last for the club.

He moved on to Worcester City of the Southern League Premier Division in August 1999. Though he scored "a handful of vital goals to help City avoid relegation from the Premier Division", he failed to establish himself in the first team, and following two months on loan at Evesham United, he made the move permanent in December 2000. Only three months later, unhappy with his form and feeling he was no longer doing himself justice, Deakin announced his retirement.

In July 2001 he was appointed manager of Oldbury United's youth team. At the end of the 2001–02 season, he took up the equivalent post with former club Kidderminster Harriers, which he left in October 2003, after the departure of manager Ian Britton, citing work commitments as a teacher. He moved on to coaching the under-16s at Walsall. At the age of 37, Deakin attempted a playing comeback with Bedworth United, but broke down in pre-season training.
