= Edward Brueton =

English footballer

Personal information
- Date of birth: 1871
- Place of birth: Penn, England
- Date of death: Unknown
- Place of death: Wolverhampton, England
- Position: Goalkeeper

Senior career*
Years	Team	Apps	(Gls)
- Stafford Rangers
1894	Small Heath	1	(0)
1894–????	Willenhall Swifts		
- * Club domestic league appearances and goals

Edward Brueton (1871 – after 1893) was an English footballer born in Penn, Staffordshire, who played in the Football League as a goalkeeper for Small Heath.

== Playing career ==
He joined Small Heath from Stafford Rangers on trial in September 1894. Without even playing reserve team football, he stood in for regular goalkeeper Charles Partridge in the home game against Preston North End on 29 September, conceded four goals – the game finished as a 4–4 draw – and was back in non-league football with Willenhall Swifts by November.
