= Fred Hoyland =

English footballer

Personal information
- Full name: Wilfred Hoyland
- Date of birth: March 1898
- Place of birth: Pontefract, England
- Position: Outside right

Senior career*
Years	Team	Apps	(Gls)
1920–1922	Swansea Town	9	(0)
1922–192?	Bury	0	(0)
192?–1923	Glossop		
1923–1924	Birmingham	6	(0)
1924–1926	Brighton & Hove Albion	5	(0)
- * Club domestic league appearances and goals

Wilfred Hoyland (March 1898 – after 1925) was an English professional footballer who played in the Football League for Swansea Town, Birmingham and Brighton & Hove Albion.

Hoyland was born in Pontefract, which was then in the West Riding of Yorkshire. He made his debut in the Football League for Swansea Town in the recently formed Third Division South. He then played for Bury, though not in the Football League, and for Glossop before joining Birmingham in September 1923. Described as a well-built winger, he had a run of games in the First Division deputising for the injured Billy Harvey, but at the end of the 1923–24 season moved back to the Third Division with Brighton & Hove Albion. He played five times in the league for Brighton, but was primarily a reserve.
