= Ernie Moore =

English footballer

Personal information
- Date of birth: 1869
- Place of birth: Birmingham, England
- Date of death: Unknown
- Position: Left back

Senior career*
Years	Team	Apps	(Gls)
- Sparkhill Alliance
1893–1895	Small Heath	1	(0)
1895–1???	Hockley Hill		
- * Club domestic league appearances and goals

Ernest W. Moore (1869 – after 1894) was an English professional footballer who played in the Football League for Small Heath. He played as a left back.

Moore was born in Birmingham. He played for Sparkhill Alliance before joining Birmingham of the Second Division in 1893. He made a promising start in the United Counties League, a secondary competition, but when the club signed Sid Oliver, he slipped down the pecking order. The only game he played in the Football League, on 29 December 1894, a 3–0 home win against Liverpool, was when Oliver was injured, and he returned to local football with Hockley Hill in 1895.
