= Bill Purves =

Irish footballer

William Purves
Personal information
- Full name: William Michael Purves
- Date of birth: 1870
- Place of birth: Belfast, Ireland
- Date of death: Unknown
- Position: Right back

Senior career*
Years	Team	Apps	(Gls)
18??–1893	Glentoran		
1893–1897	Birmingham (Note: The Matthews source misattributes to Purves a League appearance made by Bernard Pumfrey on 30 December 1893, some time before Purves joined Small Heath.)	40	(0)
1897–1???	Glentoran		

International career
1894–1898	Irish League	3	(0)
- * Club domestic league appearances and goals

William Michael Purves (1870 – after 1900) was an Irish professional footballer who played as a right back. He made 40 appearances in the Football League, playing for Small Heath in the 1890s. He played three times for the Irish League representative team.

Purves was born in Belfast and played for Glentoran before coming to England to join Small Heath in March 1894. He played in the last three matches of the 1893–94 Football League regular season and in the test match that confirmed their ascent to the First Division. He played every game of the club's first top-flight season, but lost his place to Frank Lester in 1895–96 and returned to Glentoran. From 1900 he acted as Glentoran's trainer.
