= Tilson Pritchard =

English footballer

Personal information
- Full name: Tilson Pritchard
- Date of birth: 1872
- Place of birth: Walsall Wood, England
- Date of death: Unknown
- Position: Right back

Senior career*
Years	Team	Apps	(Gls)
- Burntwood Swifts
1894–1895	Small Heath	1	(0)
1895–1???	Lichfield Town		
- * Club domestic league appearances and goals

Tilson Pritchard (1872 – after 1894) was an English footballer who played in the Football League for Small Heath.

Pritchard was born in Walsall Wood, Staffordshire, and joined Small Heath from Burntwood Swifts in April 1894. Despite failing to impress in the United Counties League, a minor competition, he stood in for the injured Dowk Oliver in the First Division match away to Blackburn Rovers on 5 January 1895. Blackburn won 9–1, and Pritchard soon returned to non-league football with Lichfield Town.
