= Dennis Isherwood (footballer, born 1947) =

English footballer

Personal information
- Full name: Dennis Isherwood
- Date of birth: 20 January 1947 (age 79) death 2020
- Place of birth: Brierley Hill, England
- Position: Right back

Youth career
- Brierley Hill Schools
- 1962–1964: Birmingham City

Senior career*
Years	Team	Apps	(Gls)
1964–1968	Birmingham City	5	(1)
1968–19??	Bromsgrove Rovers		
–	Kidderminster Harriers		
- * Club domestic league appearances and goals

Dennis Isherwood (born 20 January 1947) is an English former professional footballer who played in the Football League for Birmingham City.

Isherwood was born in Brierley Hill, Staffordshire. He played representative football for Brierley Hill Schools before joining Birmingham City when he left school in 1962. He turned professional two years later, and made his debut in the Second Division on 31 December 1966 in a 3–3 draw away to Norwich City. Ray Martin had been injured for some weeks, and Isherwood played at right back to allow Martin's regular deputy Bert Murray to switch to the left in place of the unavailable Colin Green. He had a run of four games in similar circumstances later that season, and scored the winning goal against Hull City in the first of these, but Martin's return to fitness pushed him down the pecking order. In 1968, he moved into non-league football with Bromsgrove Rovers and later played for Kidderminster Harriers.

After retiring from football, Isherwood took up tennis. He went on to win local doubles titles and has played for Hereford and Worcester county over-55s team.
