= Andy Harris (footballer, born 1970) =

English footballer (born 1970)

Personal information
- Full name: Andrew Harris
- Date of birth: 17 November 1970 (age 55)
- Place of birth: Birmingham, England
- Height: 5 ft 10 in (1.78 m)
- Position: Midfielder

Youth career
- 1988–1989: Birmingham City

Senior career*
| Years | Team | Apps | (Gls) |
| 1989–1991 | Birmingham City | 1 | (0) |
| 1990 | → Telford United (loan) | 6 | (1) |
| 1991 | → Oxford United (loan) | 1 | (0) |
| 1991–1994 | Exeter City | 38 | (1) |
| 1994–1995 | Nuneaton Borough | 33 | (3) |
| 1995 | Corby Town | | |
| 1995 | Hinckley Athletic | 2 | (0) |
| 1995–1996 | Solihull Borough | | |
| 1996–1997 | Hinckley Athletic | | |
| 1998–1999 | Knowle Town | | |
| 1999–200? | Paget Rangers | | |
- * Club domestic league appearances and goals

Andrew Harris (born 17 November 1970) is an English former professional footballer who made 40 appearances in the Football League playing for Birmingham City, Oxford United and Exeter City. He played as a midfielder.

== Life and career ==
Harris was born in Birmingham. He joined Birmingham City as an apprentice under the YTS scheme, and turned professional two years later. He made his debut on 11 November 1989, substituting for John Frain in a goalless draw at Leyton Orient in the Football League Third Division. In March 1990, he signed on loan for Telford United, and scored once from six appearances in the Football Conference. He went on loan in October 1991 to Oxford United of the Second Division, where he played only once, and the following month was allowed to move to Exeter City. In two and a half years at Exeter, Harris played 38 games in the third tier, scoring one league goal, which came against Stoke City.

In April 1994, he moved into non-league football with Nuneaton Borough of the Southern League Premier Division. He played twice that season, and was a regular in 1994–95, scoring three goals from 31 Southern League Midland Division matches, before moving on to another Midland Division club, Corby Town, ahead of the 1995–96 season. He joined Midland Alliance team Hinckley Athletic in November 1995, but only played twice before returning to the Southern League Midland Division and moving nearer home to Solihull Borough. He rejoined Hinckley Athletic late in 1996, but a knee injury disrupted his return.

In July 1998, Peter Frain was appointed manager of Knowle Town with Harris as his assistant and player. He left for Paget Rangers of the Southern League Western Division at the end of the season.
