= Peter Neil =

Scottish footballer (1898–1976)

Personal information
- Full name: Peter Gibson Neil
- Date of birth: 1898
- Place of birth: Airdrie, Scotland
- Date of death: 1976 (aged 77–78)
- Place of death: Cambuslang, Scotland
- Height: 5 ft 5 in (1.65 m)
- Position: Outside right

Senior career*
Years	Team	Apps	(Gls)
1919–1920	Cambuslang Rangers		
1920–1921	East Fife		
1921–1922	Birmingham	5	(0)
1922–1923	Heart of Midlothian	7	(0)
1923	East Fife	8	(1)
1923–1924	Alloa Athletic	2	(0)
- * Club domestic league appearances and goals

Peter Gibson Neil (1898 – 1976) was a Scottish footballer who played in the English Football League for Birmingham. He played mainly as an outside right.

Neil was born in Airdrie but spent much of his life in Cambuslang, both in Lanarkshire. With his teenage years interrupted by World War I, he began his career with local junior side Cambuslang Rangers at the end of the conflict and soon moved on East Fife, then playing in the Central League, and was in the team that won the Scottish Qualifying Cup. He joined Birmingham from East Fife in April 1921, and made his debut in the First Division on 17 September 1921 in a 1–1 draw at home to Everton. He made four more appearances during the 1921–22 season, on each occasion deputising for Bill Harvey.

Neil returned to Scotland in September 1922 to join Heart of Midlothian of Scottish Division One. After less than a season in Edinburgh he switched to second tier Bo'ness, and at the end of 1923 transferred to Alloa Athletic, his final club before retiring.
