= Brian Arrowsmith =

English footballer and manager (1940–2020)

Personal information
- Full name: Brian Arrowsmith
- Date of birth: 2 July 1940
- Place of birth: Barrow-in-Furness, Lancashire, England
- Date of death: 12 April 2020 (aged 79)
- Position: Defender

Youth career
- Vickers Sports Club

Senior career*
Years	Team	Apps	(Gls)
1961–1971	Barrow	378	(3)
1971–1974	Netherfield	?	(?)
1974–1978	Barrow	134	(?)

Managerial career
- 1974–1975: Barrow
- * Club domestic league appearances and goals

Brian Arrowsmith (2 July 1940 – 12 April 2020) was an English footballer and manager. Born in Barrow-in-Furness, he spent his entire professional career at his hometown club Barrow. He made 512 appearances for Barrow, including 378 in the Football League, the most at that level for the club.

Arrowsmith started his career as a right back, but played across the defence when required. He captained Barrow during the 1966–67 season in which they won promotion from the Fourth Division, and stayed with the club for a total of eleven seasons. After leaving Barrow in 1971 Arrowsmith joined Northern Premier League club Netherfield, but returned to Barrow – who by then had been voted out of the Football League and placed in the Northern Premier League themselves – in 1974 as player-manager. He resigned as manager in November 1975, but continued playing for the club until 1978.

After retiring from football, Arrowsmith ran a DIY shop in Barrow, regularly attending Barrow matches as a fan. His son, Mark, made six appearances for Barrow in the 1980s. In January 2017, the main stand at Barrow's Holker Street stadium was renamed the Brian Arrowsmith Stand in his honour.

Arrowsmith died in hospital on Easter Sunday in 2020 having contracted COVID-19.
