= Arthur James (footballer) =

English footballer (1855–1911)

Arthur James (January 1855 – June 1911) was an English footballer who played as an outside right for Small Heath Alliance, later to become Birmingham City, from the foundation of the club in 1875 until his career was ended by injury in 1887.

== Biography ==
James was born in January 1855, in Longbridge. He played for the cricket club associated with Holy Trinity Church, in Bordesley, Birmingham, and together with his fellow members decided to form a football club for exercise and society in the winter months. The club, which they called Small Heath Alliance, played its first match in November 1875 on some waste ground in Arthur Street, Bordesley. James's brothers Tommy and Fred played in that first fixture, a 1–1 draw with Holte Wanderers of Aston, though he himself did not.

He was appointed club captain in 1878, retaining the position until 1885, and was regularly selected to represent the Birmingham County F.A. in challenge matches against other major associations. In its centenary volume, the association describes the club as

blessed in having Arthur James from 1878 to 1885 as their captain, this player ranking as one of the most brilliant wing forwards of the day, he often represented the Birmingham Association at a time when competition was keen.

He made five appearances in the FA Cup, scoring three goals. His career ended in 1887 through a combination of illness and injury.

James died in Birmingham in June 1911, aged 56.
