= Charles Partridge (footballer) =

English footballer (1867–c.1898)

Personal information
- Full name: Charles Partridge
- Date of birth: 1867
- Place of birth: Wednesbury, England
- Date of death: Unknown
- Position: Goalkeeper

Senior career*
Years	Team	Apps	(Gls)
–1890	Wednesbury Old Athletic		
1890–1896	Small Heath	31	(0)
1896–189?	Willenhall		
189?–1897	Sparkhill		
1897	Park Mills		
1897	Redditch Town		
1898–1???	Headless Cross		
- * Club domestic league appearances and goals

Charles Partridge (1867 – after 1898) was an English professional footballer who made 29 appearances in the Football League for Small Heath. He played as a goalkeeper.

Partridge was born in Wednesbury, Staffordshire. He played football for Wednesbury Old Athletic before joining Small Heath in 1890. He played two games in Small Heath's second season in the Football Alliance, as a replacement for Chris Charsley and once in their second season in the Football League, replacing George Hollis. In the 1894–95 season, the club's first in the First Division, Partridge was first-choice goalkeeper, and had the dubious honour of being in goal for the club's record defeat, 9–1, away to Blackburn Rovers in January 1895. He lost his place the following season to Jim Roach, and went on to play for a variety of clubs in the Black Country, Birmingham and north Worcestershire.
