= Trevor Wolstenholme =

English footballer

Personal information
- Full name: Trevor John Wolstenholme
- Date of birth: 18 June 1943 (age 83)
- Place of birth: Prestbury, England
- Positions: Wing half; inside forward

Youth career
- 1959–1960: Birmingham City

Senior career*
| Years | Team | Apps | (Gls) |
| 1960–1963 | Birmingham City | 0 | (0) |
| 1963–1966 | Torquay United | 82 | (2) |
| 1966–1967 | York City | 11 | (0) |
- * Club domestic league appearances and goals

Trevor John Wolstenholme (born 18 June 1943) is an English former professional footballer who made 93 appearances in the Football League playing for Torquay United and York City.

Wolstenholme was born in Prestbury, Cheshire. He began his football career as a junior with Birmingham City in 1959, and turned professional the following year. He made his first-team debut as a 19-year-old, deputising for Welsh international inside forward Ken Leek in a League Cup third-round match away at Barrow, and scored Birmingham's goal to secure a 1–1 draw. He kept his place for the replay, this time playing in Malcolm Beard's position at left half; Birmingham won comfortably, and went on to win the competition. Those were the only two first-team games that Wolstenholme played for Birmingham. In August 1963 he joined Torquay United, where he played 82 league games in three seasons, and then finished off his Football League career with York City.
