= Edmund Wood (footballer) =

English footballer

Personal information
- Full name: Edmund Eli Wood
- Date of birth: 10 February 1903
- Place of birth: Stirchley, England
- Date of death: 1 June 1986 (aged 83)
- Place of death: Northampton, England
- Height: 5 ft 10 3/4 in (1.80 m)
- Position: Centre half

Senior career*
Years	Team	Apps	(Gls)
- Redditch
- Rhyl Athletic
1923–1925	Northampton Town	50	(3)
1925–1928	Birmingham	1	(0)
1928	Rhyl Athletic		
1928–1930	Newcastle United	9	(0)
1930–19??	Rhyl Athletic		
- * Club domestic league appearances and goals

Edmund Eli Wood (10 February 1903 – 1 June 1986) was an English professional footballer who made 60 appearances in the Football League playing for Northampton Town, Birmingham and Newcastle United. He played as a centre half.

Wood was born in Stirchley, which was then in Worcestershire and became part of Birmingham in 1911, and played for Redditch and Rhyl Athletic before joining Northampton Town. He played 50 games in the Third Division South for Northampton, then moved to First Division club Birmingham in 1925, where he played only one first-team game. After another spell with Rhyl Wood returned to the First Division to play nine times for Newcastle United before going back to Rhyl yet again. He died in Northampton in 1986 at the age of 83.

He was the nephew of another Edmund Wood, also a footballer, who was awarded a medal in the 1901-1902 West Bromwich Charity Cup.
