= Charlie Leatherbarrow =

English footballer

Personal information
- Date of birth: 16 January 1870
- Place of birth: Banbury, England
- Date of death: 26 December 1940 (aged 70)
- Place of death: Birmingham, England
- Positions: Inside right; centre forward

Senior career*
Years	Team	Apps	(Gls)
–	Northwich Victoria		
18??–1893	Rotherham Town	12	(4)
1893–1894	Walsall Town Swifts	24	(12)
1894–1895	Small Heath	5	(3)
1895–1896	Millwall Athletic		
1896–1897	Chatham		
1897–1898	Cowes		
1898–1???	Wellington Town		
- * Club domestic league appearances and goals

Charles Leatherbarrow (born Letherbarrow) (16 January 1870 – 26 December 1940) was an English professional footballer born in Banbury who played in the Football League for Rotherham Town, Walsall Town Swifts and Small Heath. He played at inside right or centre forward.

== Playing career ==
Leatherbarrow was playing for Midland League champions Rotherham Town by September 1892. He is reported as scoring their late consolation goal in Liverpool's first ever match at Anfield, a 7–1 victory in a friendly on 1 September 1892. Leatherbarrow assisted Rotherham to retain their Midland League title, and remained with the club for the start of the 1893–94 season – their first season in the Football League – but in December 1893 he moved to fellow Second Division club Walsall Town Swifts. His scoring rate for Walsall of a goal every other game attracted the attention of Small Heath, who signed him prior to their first season in the First Division.

Described as "stocky and very quick off the mark", Leatherbarrow had scored freely at each of his previous clubs; he had a run of four games in the absence of Billy Walton, and scored a hat-trick in the second of those, but was unable to force his way into Small Heath's first-choice eleven. In April 1895 he moved to Southern League champions Millwall Athletic, and his 17 league goals made a major contribution to the club retaining their title in the 1895–96 season. In December 1896 he joined fellow Southern League club Chatham.

== Honours ==
Rotherham Town

- Midland League champions: 1892–93

Millwall Athletic

- Southern League champions: 1895–96
