= Bill Lewis (footballer, born 1871) =

English footballer

Personal information
- Full name: William Jasper Lewis
- Date of birth: 1871
- Place of birth: Birmingham, England
- Date of death: Unknown
- Position: Outside right

Senior career*
Years	Team	Apps	(Gls)
- Windsor Street Gas Depot
1894–1896	Small Heath	2	(1)
–	Nechells (Note: Matthews gives Hereford Town where Joyce has Nechells.)		
–	Stourbridge		
1902–19??	Leicester Fosse	30	(3)
–	Stourbridge		
- * Club domestic league appearances and goals

William Jasper Lewis (1871 – after 1902) was an English professional footballer who played in the Football League for Small Heath and Leicester Fosse.

Lewis was born in the Bordesley Green district of Birmingham. He joined Small Heath from local football in February 1894. He scored on his debut in the First Division on 29 December 1894, deputising for regular outside right Jack Hallam in a home game against Liverpool which Small Heath won 3–0. Though he kept his place for the next game, his only other appearance for the first team was in the 1896 FA Cup first round match against Bury, in which he also scored. Despite a goal return of two in three games, he returned to non-league football later that year. Some six years later he resumed his Football League career with Leicester Fosse; he scored three goals in 30 Second Division games before returning to former club Stourbridge.
