= Joe Fountain =

English footballer

Personal information
- Full name: Edwin Joseph Fountain
- Date of birth: 21 September 1871
- Place of birth: Aston, England
- Date of death: 1946 (aged 66)
- Place of death: Birmingham, England
- Position: Forward

Senior career*
Years	Team	Apps	(Gls)
- Calthorpe
- Small Heath Langley
1894–1896	Small Heath	3	(0)
1896–189?	Birmingham St George's		
–	Worcester Rovers		
–	Hereford Town		
–	Heath United		
- * Club domestic league appearances and goals

Edwin Joseph Fountain (21 September 1871 – 1946) was an English professional footballer born in Aston, which is now part of Birmingham, who played in the Football League for Small Heath. Fountain, a left-sided forward, struggled to compete with Fred Wheldon and Toddy Hands. He made his debut in the First Division on 9 February 1895 in a 1–1 draw at home to Sunderland, and played once more during that season and once towards the end of the next, before returning to local football in the Midlands area.

He married Emily Jane Payne in Birmingham on 21 December 1895. He died in 1946.
