= Vincent White (footballer) =

English footballer (1897–1972)

Personal information
- Full name: Vincent Harold White
- Date of birth: 22 October 1897
- Place of birth: Walsall, England
- Date of death: 27 August 1972 (aged 74)
- Place of death: Southampton, England
- Height: 5 ft 9 in (1.75 m)
- Position: Wing half

Senior career*
Years	Team	Apps	(Gls)
- Erdington
- Wednesbury Old Athletic
1921–1923	Birmingham	2	(0)
- Ellesmere Port
- Redditch Town
1923–1925	Watford	7	(1)
- * Club domestic league appearances and goals

Vincent Harold White (22 October 1897 – 27 August 1972) was an English professional footballer who played as a wing half in the Football League for Birmingham and Watford.

== Life and career ==
White was born in 1897 in Walsall, Staffordshire, the son of Joseph White and his wife Emma. Joseph White worked in the brewery trade: he was steward of Walsall Conservative Club before taking over as manager of the New Inn in 1901, a pub previously held by the Welsh international footballer Caesar Jenkyns, and the 1911 Census finds him living in the Erdington district of Birmingham and employed as a brewer's assistant. The 13-year-old Vincent was an office boy at an electrical engineering company. White enlisted in the Machine Gun Corps and served with the 24th Battalion of the London Regiment during the First World War.

He had played football for his battalion team during the war, and once demobilised, played amateur football for Erdington before turning professional, first with Wednesbury Old Athletic and then in 1921 with Birmingham. A defensive wing half whose strength was his tackling, White made his debut in the First Division on 8 April 1922, deputising for Percy Barton in a 2–1 defeat away at Tottenham Hotspur, and played in the next game, but lost his place once Barton was available for selection again. Despite having played League football, he was selected for and played in a junior international between the Birmingham Association and the Scottish Junior XI at Aberdeen on 22 April. He spent time at non-league clubs Ellesmere Port and Redditch Town before joining Watford, for whom he played seven Third Division South matches in the first of two seasons with the club.

White married Lily Laura Edge in 1930. The 1939 Register finds White working as a spray-painting foreman and living in Erdington with Lily and a school-age child. He was resident in the Bassett district of Southampton at the time of his death in the city in 1972 aged 74.
