= Jack Shufflebotham =

English footballer

Personal information
- Full name: John Shufflebotham
- Date of birth: 11 April 1885
- Place of birth: Macclesfield, England
- Date of death: 4 May 1951 (aged 66)
- Place of death: Weston-super-Mare, England
- Position: Centre half

Senior career*
Years	Team	Apps	(Gls)
- Hanley Town
- Loughborough Corinthians
1903–1904	Aston Villa	0	(0)
1904–1905	Notts County	1	(0)
1905	Old Hill		
1905–1907	Birmingham	1	(0)
1907–1909	Oldham Athletic	7	(1)
1909–1911	Portsmouth		
1911–1914	Southport Central		
- * Club domestic league appearances and goals

John Shufflebotham (11 April 1885 – 4 May 1951) was an English professional footballer who played in the Football League for Notts County, Birmingham and Oldham Athletic. He played as a centre half.

== Life and career ==
Shufflebotham was born in Macclesfield, Cheshire. He played for Hanley Town and Loughborough Corinthians, and was on the books of Aston Villa without appearing for the first team, before making his debut in the First Division of the Football League for Notts County during the 1904–05 season. After a spell with Old Hill Shufflebotham returned to the First Division, playing one game for Birmingham in 1906 before moving on to Oldham Athletic, newly elected to the Second Division. He played seven league games for Oldham, but was allowed to leave for Southern League club Portsmouth in 1909. Oldham retained his Football League registration, and two years later they sold him to Southport Central for a fee of £150. He retired from football in October 1914.

Shufflebotham worked as a timber merchant's agent in the Birmingham area both before and after the First World War. He died in Weston-super-Mare, Somerset, in 1951 at the age of 66.
