= Willie Havenga =

South African soccer player

Personal information
- Full name: William Stephanus Havenga
- Date of birth: 6 November 1924
- Place of birth: Bloemfontein, South Africa
- Date of death: 12 December 2008 (aged 84)
- Place of death: South Africa
- Position: Inside forward

Senior career*
| Years | Team | Apps | (Gls) |
| – | Bremner Old Boys | | |
| 1948–1950 | Birmingham City | 1 | (0) |
| 1950–1952 | Luton Town | 18 | (6) |
| 1952–1953 | Ipswich Town | 19 | (3) |
| 1953–195? | Kettering Town | 8 | (5) |
- Worcester City
- Hinckley Athletic
- Halesowen Town
- Benoni United
- * Club domestic league appearances and goals

William Stephanus Havenga (6 November 1924 – 12 December 2008), commonly known as Billy or Willie Havenga, was a South African professional footballer who played in the Football League for Birmingham City, Luton Town and Ipswich Town. He also played in South Africa and in non-league football in England.

== Career ==
Havenga was born in Bloemfontein. He played in South Africa for Bremner Old Boys before coming to England for trials with Birmingham City. The trials were successful, and Havenga signed for the club in July 1948. He made his debut in the First Division on 22 October 1949, playing at outside right in a goalless draw at home to Everton, but his proved to be his only first-team game for the club. At the end of the 1949–50 season Havenga joined Second Division club Luton Town. He spent 18 months with Luton, scoring six goals from 18 league games, before moving to Ipswich Town, for whom he scored three goals from 19 Third Division South games. He scored five goals from eight appearances for Southern League club Kettering Town during the 1953–54 season, and also played for Worcester City, Hinckley Athletic and Halesowen Town.

Havenga then returned to his native South Africa, where he died in 2008 at the age of 84.
