= John Oliver (footballer, born 1867) =

English footballer

Personal information
- Full name: John Sidney Oliver
- Date of birth: 1867
- Place of birth: Southwick, Sunderland, England
- Date of death: Unknown
- Position: Full back

Youth career
- –: Southwick (County Durham)

Senior career*
Years	Team	Apps	(Gls)
1887–1892	Sunderland	23	(0)
1892–1894	Middlesbrough Ironopolis	21	(0)
1894–1896	Small Heath	57	(0)
1896–1???	Durham		
- * Club domestic league appearances and goals

John Sidney Oliver (1867 – after 1895) was an English professional footballer born in Southwick, Sunderland, who played as a full back. He made 101 appearances in the Football League playing for Sunderland, Middlesbrough Ironopolis and Small Heath.
