= Logan (surname) =

Logan is a surname.

== Notable people with the surname "Logan" include ==
- Abraham Logan (1816–1873), English lawyer and editor
- Adam Logan (born 1975), Canadian mathematician
- Adella Hunt Logan (1863–1915), American writer
- Adrian Logan (born 1955), Northern Irish television presenter
- Alastair Logan, English lecturer
- Alec Logan (1882–1918), Scottish footballer
- Alexander Logan (1841–1894), Canadian politician
- Ana Rivas Logan (born 1961), American politician
- Andrew Logan (disambiguation), multiple people
- Andy Logan (1918–1998), American football player
- Archibald Logan (1865–1940), New Zealand yacht designer
- Arthur Logan (disambiguation), multiple people
- Aubrey Logan (born 1988), American singer
- Bellina Logan (born 1966), American actress
- Benjamin Logan (1742–1802), American pioneer
- Benjamin F. Logan (1927–2015), American engineer
- Bennie Logan (born 1989), American football player
- Bob Logan (disambiguation), multiple people
- Boone Logan (born 1984), American baseball player
- Brad Logan, American guitarist
- Bruce Logan (disambiguation), multiple people
- Cammy Logan (born 2002), Scottish footballer
- Campbell Logan (1910–1978), British television producer
- Campbell Logan (racing driver) (born 2004), Australian racing driver
- Captain Logan (1776–1812), Native American warrior
- Carlos Logan (born 1985), English footballer
- Carolyn Logan (born 1957), American politician
- Carrie Steele Logan (1829–1900), American philanthropist
- Celia Logan (1837–1904), American actress
- Charles Logan (disambiguation), multiple people
- Coley Logan (1912–1999), American baseball player
- Conrad Logan (born 1986), Irish footballer
- Cornelius Logan (disambiguation), multiple people
- Craig Logan (born 1969), Scottish music manager
- Crawford Logan, British actor
- Dan Logan (born 1985), English musician
- Daniel Logan (born 1987), New Zealand actor
- Dasha Logan (born 1987), Malaysian singer-songwriter
- David Logan (disambiguation), multiple people
- Deborah Norris Logan (1761–1839), American historian
- Devin Logan (born 1993), American skier
- Dick Logan (disambiguation), multiple people
- Don Logan (disambiguation), multiple people
- Donald Logan (1917–2009), British diplomat
- Doug Logan (born 1943), American sports executive
- Eddie Logan (1910–2009), American baseball player
- Edward Lawrence Logan (1875–1939), American politician
- Eileen Logan (1930–2015), English lawn bowler
- Eliza Logan (1827–1872), American actress
- Elle Logan (born 1987), American rower
- Ella Logan (1913–1969), Scottish-American actress and singer
- Emma Logan (born 1997), Canadian curler
- Emma Logan, known as October (born 1997), New Zealand singer, songwriter, and model
- Ernie Logan (born 1968), American football player
- F. Donald Logan (1930–2022), American historian
- Feargal Logan, Irish Gaelic football player
- Fran Logan (born 1956), Australian politician
- Fred Logan (born 1952), American politician
- Freddy Logan (1930–2003), English musician
- Gabby Logan (born 1973), English television presenter
- Gary Logan (born 1971), Scottish curler
- George Logan (disambiguation), multiple people
- Gerald Logan (1879–1951), English field hockey player
- Giuseppi Logan (1935–2020), American musician
- Glen Logan (born 1998), American football player
- Gordon Logan (born 1949), Scottish footballer
- Gordon Logan (psychologist), American psychologist
- Grant Logan (born 1980), Scottish lawn bowler
- Gregory Logan (born 1963), New Zealand cricketer
- Gwendolyn Logan (1881–1967), British-American actress
- Guy Murray Logan (1899–1986), Canadian politician
- Hance James Logan (1869–1944), Canadian lawyer and politician
- Harlan D. Logan (??–1994), American politician
- Harold Logan (footballer) (1906–1995), Australian rules footballer
- Harry Logan (1888–1910), Scottish footballer
- Harvey Logan (1867–1904), American outlaw
- Helen Logan (1906–1989), American screenwriter
- Henry Logan (disambiguation), multiple people
- Herschel C. Logan (1901–1987), American artist
- Horace Logan (1916–2002), American musician
- Hugh Logan (1834–1903), American soldier
- Hugh Logan (cricketer) (1885–1919), English cricketer
- Hugo Logan (born 1998), English footballer
- Ian Logan (born 1982), Canadian football player
- Irene Logan (born 1994), Liberian-Ghanaian singer-songwriter
- Jack Logan (disambiguation), multiple people
- Jacqueline Logan (1902–1983), American actress
- Jake Logan (wrestler) (born 1993), American professional wrestler
- James Logan (disambiguation), multiple people
- Janice Logan (1915–1965), American actress
- Jason Logan, Canadian illustrator
- Jeff Logan, American football player
- Jennifer Logan, English scientist
- Jenny Logan (born 1942), English actress
- Jerry Logan (born 1941), American football player
- Jim Logan (disambiguation), multiple people
- Joe Logan (born 1974), American basketball coach
- Joel Logan (born 1995), English footballer
- John Logan (disambiguation), multiple people
- Johnny Logan (disambiguation), multiple people
- Josh Logan (disambiguation), multiple people
- Juan Logan (born 1946), American artist
- Jud Logan (1959–2022), American hammer thrower
- Karl Logan (born 1965), American musician
- Kenny Logan (born 1972), Scottish rugby union footballer
- Kirsty Logan (born 1984), Scottish novelist
- Lara Logan (born 1971), South African journalist
- Leroy Logan (born 1957), English police officer
- Les Logan (1908–2000), Australian politician
- Lillie Logan (1843–1923), American painter
- Lillian Logan, American actress
- Lorie K. Logan, American financier
- Logan Sargeant, American racing driver
- Mal Logan (1931–2022), Australian geographer
- Marc Logan (born 1965), American football player
- Marc Logan (broadcast journalist) (born 1971), Filipino journalist
- Mark Logan (disambiguation), multiple people
- Martha Daniell Logan (1704–1779), American botanist
- Mary Simmerson Cunningham Logan (1838–1923), American writer
- Maurice Logan (1886–1977), American artist
- Max Logan (1934–2006), Australian rules footballer
- Michael Logan (disambiguation), multiple people
- M. L. Logan, British rugby union footballer
- M. M. Logan (1874–1939), American politician
- Myra Adele Logan (1908–1977), American physician
- Neil Logan (1875–1949), Scottish footballer
- Nick Logan (born 1947), English journalist
- Nick Logan (baseball) (1896–1975), American baseball player
- Nook Logan (born 1979), American baseball player
- Obert Logan (1941–2003), American football player
- Olive Logan (1839–1909), American actress
- Oni Logan, Argentine-American singer
- Onnie Lee Logan (1910–1995), American midwife
- Paddy Logan (disambiguation), multiple people
- Patrick Logan (1791–1830), English colonist
- Paul Logan (disambiguation), multiple people
- Peyton Logan (born 1998), American football player
- Phyllis Logan (born 1956), Scottish actress
- Piper Logan (born 2001), Canadian rugby sevens footballer
- Randy Logan (born 1951), American football player
- Rayford Logan (1897–1982), American historian and activist
- Raymond Logan (born 1978), Scottish footballer
- Rennie Logan (1928–2003), Scottish lawn bowler
- Richard Logan (disambiguation), multiple people
- Ricky Dean Logan, American actor
- Robert Logan (disambiguation), multiple people
- Rodman Logan (1922–2004), Canadian politician
- Rodrigo Logan (born 1980), Chilean politician
- Ron Logan (1938–2022), American corporate executive
- Ross Logan (1909–1993), Scottish rugby union footballer
- Rufus Logan, American editor
- Sadye L. Logan, American academic
- Samantha Logan (born 1996), American actress
- Samuel Logan (born 1976), American investigative journalist
- Samuel T. Logan (born 1943), American theologian
- Sarah Logan (born 1993), American professional wrestler
- Saxon Logan (born 1956), British-South African director
- Scott Logan (disambiguation), multiple people
- Seamus Logan (born 1958), British politician
- Sean Logan (born 1970), American politician
- Sean D. Logan (born 1966), American politician
- Shay Logan (born 1988), English footballer
- Stanley Logan (1885–1953), English actor
- Stefan Logan (born 1981), American football player
- Stephen Logan (disambiguation), multiple people
- Steve Logan (born 1980), American basketball player
- Steve Logan (American football) (born 1953), American football coach
- Steven Paul Logan (born 1965), American judge
- Thomas Logan (disambiguation), multiple people
- Tip Logan (1927–2007), Canadian football player
- T. J. Logan (born 1994), American football player
- Tom Logan (disambiguation), multiple people
- Tommy Logan (1888–1862), Scottish footballer
- Trevon Logan, American economist
- Veronica Logan (born 1969), Italian actress
- Vincent Logan (1941–2021), Scottish bishop
- Wayne Logan, American author
- Wendell Logan (1940–2010), American musician
- Wenonah Bond Logan (1906–1993), American sociologist
- W. H. Logan, American politician
- William Logan (disambiguation), multiple people
- Willie Logan (born 1957), American politician
- Winifred W. Logan (1931–2010), British nurse
- W. Turner Logan (1874–1941), American politician
- Yohanna Logan (born 1975), American fashion designer
- Zachari Logan (born 1980), Canadian visual artist

== Fictional characters ==
- Brooke Logan, a character on the soap opera The Bold and the Beautiful
- Donna Logan, a character on the soap opera The Bold and the Beautiful
- Hope Logan, a character on the soap opera The Bold and the Beautiful
- Katie Logan, a character on the soap opera The Bold and the Beautiful
- Martha Logan, a character on the television series 24

== See also ==
- Logan (disambiguation), a disambiguation page for "Logan"
- Logan (given name), a page for people with the given name "Logan"
- General Logan (disambiguation), a disambiguation page for Generals surnamed "Logan"
- Senator Logan (disambiguation), a disambiguation page for Senators surnamed "Logan"
