= James Logan =

James Logan may refer to:

== Politics and military ==
- James Logan (statesman) (1674–1751), colonial American statesman
- James Logan (c. 1723–1780), assumed name of Logan (Iroquois leader), adopted from the statesman
- James Logan (c. 1776–1812), Shawnee warrior better known as Captain Logan
- James Logan (pioneer) (1791–1859), American pioneer and statesman
- James Logan (mayor) (1852–1929), mayor of Worcester, Massachusetts
- James Kenneth Logan (1929–2018), U.S. federal judge
- James M. Logan (1920–1999), American soldier and Medal of Honor recipient

== Sports ==
- James Douglas Logan (1857–1920), Scottish-born South African cricket patron
- James Logan (footballer, born 1870) (1870–1896), Scottish striker who scored a hat-trick in the 1894 FA Cup Final
- James Logan (footballer, born 1884) (1884–1968), Scottish half back/full back (Aston Villa, Rangers)
- James Logan (footballer, born 1885) (1885–1961), Scottish forward/half back (Bradford City, Chesterfield, Bradford PA, Raith Rovers) and manager (Raith, Wrexham)
- Jimmy Logan (footballer) (1893–1968), Scottish footballer
- Jimmy Logan (footballer, born 1900) (1900-1934), Scottish footballer, see List of Bury F.C. players (1–24 appearances)
- Jim Logan (Australian footballer) (1911–1999), Australian rules footballer
- Jim Logan (American football) (1916–2004), American football player
- James Logan (ice hockey) (born 1933), known as Jim, Canadian ice hockey player
- James Logan (American football) (born 1972), American football player
- James Logan (cricketer) (born 1997), English cricketer

== Others ==
- James Logan (writer) (1797–1872), Scottish author on Gaelic culture
- James Richardson Logan (1819–1869), British lawyer and amateur ethnologist
- James Harvey Logan (1841–1928), American horticulturist
- James Kennedy Logan (1844–1912), New Zealand inspector and superintendent of telegraphs
- James Logan (trustee) (1864–1931), American school official
- James C. Logan (1914–1997), Grand Prytanis of Tau Kappa Epsilon from 1953 to 1957
- Jimmy Logan (1928–2001), Scottish actor and comedian

== See also ==
- James Logan High School, a high school in Union City, California
- Wolverine (character), uses the alias "Logan" in X-Men comics and associated media, and is born as James Howlett
