= Logan family =

Logan family may refer to:

- Logan family (historical), a prominent African American family
- Logan family (soap opera)
- Logan (given name), including a list of people and fictional characters
- Logan (surname)
- Clan Logan, a Scottish clan
