= David Logan =

David or Dave Logan may refer to:

- Dave Logan (American football) (born 1954), former NFL wide receiver
- David Logan (American football) (1956–1999), NFL defensive lineman
- Dave Logan (ice hockey) (born 1954), former NHL defenseman
- David Logan (basketball) (born 1982), American/naturalized Polish Euroleague player
- David Logan (British politician) (1871–1964), British member of parliament, 1929–1964
- David Logan (Oregon politician) (1824–1874), member of the Oregon legislature and constitutional convention
- David Logan (Kentucky politician), Kentucky state treasurer
- Sir David Logan (diplomat), British diplomat
- David Logan (chemist) (born 1956), Northern Irish professor of theoretical chemistry
- Dave Logan (writer) (born 1968), American author and professor
- David Dale Logan (1879–1956), Scottish physician, soldier and medical author
- David Logan (footballer) (born 1963), English footballer

== See also ==
- David Loggan, English painter
