= Andrew Logan =

Andrew Logan may refer to:

- Andrew Logan (sculptor) (born 1945), English artist
- Andrew Logan (songwriter) (fl. 1990s–2000s), American songwriter
- Andrew Logan (surgeon) (1906–2005), British surgeon

== See also ==
- Andy Logan (1918–1998), American football player
