= Dick Logan =

Dick Logan may refer to:

- Dick Logan (American football player)
- Dick Logan (American football coach)
- Dick Logan (Australian footballer)

== See also ==
- Richard Logan (disambiguation)
