= William Logan =

Bill, Willie or William Logan may refer to:

== Politicians and activists ==
- William Logan (politician) (1776–1822), U.S. Senator from Kentucky
- William Logan (temperance campaigner) (1813–1879), Scottish missionary and temperance activist
- William F. Logan (fl. 1860s), U.S. mayor, see List of mayors of Williamsport, Pennsylvania
- William Turner Logan (1874–1941), U.S. Representative from South Carolina
- William Logan Martin (1883–1959), U.S. Judge in Alabama and Attorney General
- Bill Logan (spartacist) (fl. 1970s), New Zealand Spartacist and member of the International Communist League
- William J. Logan (Orangeman) (fl. 1990s), Northern Irish Sovereign Grand Master of the Royal Black Preceptory
- Willie Logan (born 1957), American politician from Florida
- William Logan (Indian agent), U.S. Indian agent in Oregon and appointed superintendent of The Dalles Mint for the United States
- Bill Logan (activist) (born 1948), New Zealand political activist

== Artists and writers ==
- William Logan (author) (1841–1914), Scottish author of Malabar Manual
- William Logan (poet) (born 1950), U.S. poet and critic

== Sportspersons ==
- William Logan (cricketer) (fl. 1880s), Australian cricketer
- William Logan (footballer), Scottish footballer
- William Francis Logan (Bill Logan, born 1905), American soccer, basketball and Lacrosse coach of Princeton Tigers men's basketball
- William Logan (speed skater) (1907–1955), Canadian Olympic speed skater
- William Logan (cyclist) (1914–2002), American cyclist
- Bill Logan (basketball) (1934–2018), 1950s American basketball player, member of Iowa Hawkeyes' Fabulous Five

== Other ==
- Willie Logan (Loganair) (1913–1966), Scottish construction contractor, founder of Loganair
- William Edmond Logan (1798–1875), Canadian geologist
