= Halee Fischer-Wright =

American physician and writer

Halee Fischer-Wright is an American physician and writer. She is the co-author of the bestselling, Tribal Leadership. Fischer-Wright is no longer the CEO of the Medical Group Management Association (MGMA).

== Biography ==
After receiving her Bachelor of Arts in Molecular, Cellular, and Developmental Biology from the University of Colorado Boulder in 1990, Fischer-Wright received her Medical Doctorate from the University of Colorado School of Medicine in 1994 and completed her residency program in Pediatrics at the Phoenix Children's Hospital in 1997.

Fischer-Wright had been the chief medical officer at St. Anthony North Hospital in Denver. She started as the president and CEO of Medical Group Management Association (MGMA) in 2015. Fischer-Wright is also a member of the Healthcare Leadership Alliance and the Commission on Accreditation of Healthcare Management Education Board.

Fischer-Wright was chosen for her leadership and impact on the healthcare profession to be included in Modern Healthcare's Top 100 Healthcare Influencers in 2015. She was named to Modern Healthcare's Top 25 Women in Healthcare in 2017. Additionally, Dr. Fischer-Wright was awarded the Stevie Awards Maverick of the Year in 2016. In 2018, she was awarded 100 Great Leaders in Healthcare 2018, Becker's Hospital Review, Outstanding Women in Business finalist, Denver Business Journal, and Most Powerful Women in Healthcare Information Technology, Thought Leaders, Health Data Management.

== Writing ==
Fischer is the co-author, along with Dave Logan and John King, of Tribal Leadership (2008). The book was a The New York Times Bestseller as a paperback release in 2011. Tribal Leadership describes organizational culture and how to improve outcomes for both non-profit and for-profit organizations. Her second book is Back to Balance: The Art, Science, and Business of Medicine (2017).
