= Richard Logan =

Richard Logan may refer to:

- Richard Logan (cricketer) (born 1980), English cricketer
- Richard Logan (footballer, born 1969), English footballer, clubs included Huddersfield Town
- Richard Logan (footballer, born 1982), English footballer, clubs included Ipswich Town
- Richard Logan (footballer, born 1988), English footballer, plays for Consett

== See also ==
- Dick Logan (disambiguation)
