= Margaret Ann Gaug =

American artist

- Born: 1909; Chicago, Illinois
- Died: 1994 (aged 84–85); Buford, Georgia

Margaret Ann Gaug (1909–1994) was an American artist known primarily for her etchings but also for her decorations and illustrative art. Gaug was a member of Chicago Society of Etchers and the Prairie Printmakers of California and Illinois. Her work is included in the collections of the Smithsonian American Art Museum, the Metropolitan Museum of Art, the Memphis Brooks Museum of Art and the Philadelphia Museum of Art.
