= Herschel C. Logan =

American printmaker, illustrator, expert/author/collector of historic firearms

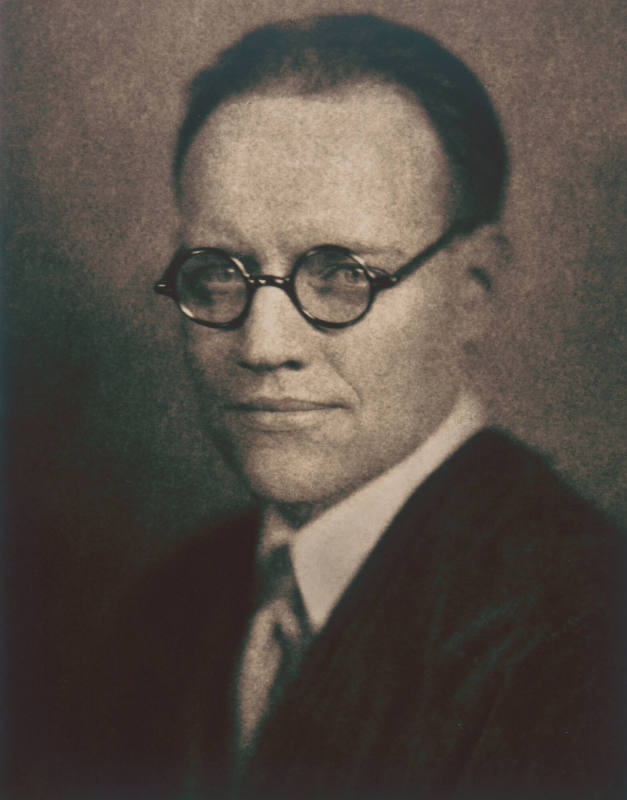
- Born: Herschel Cary Logan; April 19, 1901; Magnolia, Missouri, U.S.
- Died: December 8, 1987 (aged 86)
- Education: Chicago Academy of Fine Arts; Olivet Institute in Chicago; Federal School, Minneapolis
- Known for: Printmaker; Illustrator; Expert/collector of historic firearms Publisher of miniature books
- Movement: Social realism American realism Regionalism

Herschel C. Logan was an American artist and founding member of the Prairie Print Makers. He is known primarily today for his woodcuts of serene, nostalgic scenes of Midwest small towns and farms—mostly Kansas subjects—rendered in precise, clean lines. He earned both international acclaim as well as the nickname "The Prairie Woodcutter".

His work shows a deep admiration and respect for the beauty of rural America, and great skill in its portrayal. People were seldom a subject in these works beyond small figures as part of the landscape, though he also produced many portraits of famous Americans and other historical figures. Logan's work is similar to that of his contemporary J. J. Lankes. Scenes of rural life are dominant in both artists’ woodcuts, and both use an “L” monogram to sign their works in the print.

From 1921 to 1938, Logan produced some 140 woodcuts in editions up to 50, but then gave up printmaking as a profession. In the following nearly 50 years, he was an author and illustrator, a collector, a noted authority on firearms, and a publisher of miniature books.

== Early life and education ==
Logan was born on April 19, 1901, in Magnolia, Missouri, to Oliver Cary Logan (1877-1944) and Leota Pinkie Bills Logan (1880-1902). After the death of his mother in January 1902 his father took the remaining family, including his grandparents, to live on a farm near Winfield, Kansas. At Winfield High School he became the staff cartoonist for the school newspaper, The Oracle. After graduation in 1920 he studied commercial art at the Chicago Academy of Fine Arts. He also took courses at the Olivet Institute in Chicago and through the Federal School (aka Art Instruction, Incorporated), a correspondence art school in Minneapolis.

On June 20, 1924, Logan married his first wife, Susie Titus (1902-1990), in Wichita, Kansas. They had two children, Samuel Herschel Logan and Peggy Joan Logan.

== Career ==
After a year of studying art in Chicago, Logan took a position as branch manager for Salina Mid-Continent Engraving before accepting a job as a commercial artist for the McCormick-Armstrong Lithography Company in Wichita. One of his contributions was a series of woodcuts offered as “Exclusive Holiday Greetings from Wood Cuts by Herschel C. Logan”.

Logan left Wichita in 1929 to work for the Consolidated Printing and Stationery Company in Salina, becoming its director in 1931. He stayed there until he retired in 1967, and soon after moved to Santa Ana, California. There he met and married his second wife, Anne Lawrence Serven, in 1970. Soon after, Logan started a new career publishing miniature books (see below), and would travel around California drawing and painting trees and landscapes, typically ink or graphite with watercolor.

Logan died on December 8, 1987, in Santa Ana, California.

== Printmaking ==
It was at the Olivet Institute that Logan met fellow artists like Glenn Golton, Louis Grell, and Harry Muir Kurtzworth. A friendship with C.A. Seward, a well-known Kansas printmaker, heightened Logan's interest in woodcuts; it also put Logan in contact with other printmakers such as Lloyd Foltz, Charles Capps, Clarence Hotvedt, and Leo Courtney and painter Birger Sandzen from nearby Lindsborg. It was through these friendships that Logan learned the art of printmaking, and that eventually led to their founding, with others, the Prairie Print Makers society in 1930. There Logan “lent his skill as a craftsman and instinctive aptitude for carving wood blocks that had established his national recognition by the age of twenty-three.”

Logan gained considerable recognition for his body of editioned woodcuts, most of them about Kansas. He was exhibited extensively in the Mid-West, but also at international exhibitions in Los Angeles and at the 1939 New York World's Fair. Logan worked from life, using photographs or sketches he made on location, often finding inspiration in simple structures by the roadside while driving. He would spend several days studying and refining a sketch before proceeding.

In 1938 Logan collaborated on a book entitled “Other Days in Pictures and Verse”. Presenting a nostalgic view of "The Good Old Days" in small town America, it incorporates 12 woodcuts, prose poems by Everett Scrogin, and decorations by C.A. Seward.

Portraits were another favorite subject for Logan. Twelve prints of famous Americans were gathered into a book with short biographies, and later reissued as a calendar by the Consolidated Printing Company.

Famous printers and printmakers throughout history were another focus of Logan's portraiture. He produced over 100 portraits in pen in ink for a book project “Great Names in Printing Through Six Centuries” that was never realized despite having lithographic reproductions prepared and possible page mockups. Fifteen of these were published posthumously in the miniature book Portraits of Some Famous Printers as a keepsake for the 1992 joint meeting of the Roxburghe & Zamorano Clubs.

Logan abandoned fine art printmaking in general after 1938. Logan himself recalled “...after my friend Seward’s long illness and death [Jan 31, 1939], I simply lost interest in making prints.” “But perhaps more to blame were Herschel’s restless energies which were diverted to other enterprises.” By then he had thoroughly explored his love of the Kansas countryside from farms to towns to landmarks, often revisiting scenes often in different seasons or different times of the day. Logan later reflected “After World War II, abstract art and painting became more popular and took over, and printmaking just kind of fell apart."

Logan did not completely abandon woodblock printing, nor its companions linocut and rubber plates. Throughout his career he advocated woodcut as a desirable medium for a straightforward presentation of an idea in his commercial work and designed many woodcut logos, emblems and bookplates. This extended to a woodcut style – he emulated woodcuts in many of his commercial work and later drawings, a technique he developed for advertising purposes, “satisfactory and yet may be produced quickly and with less difficulty”. Logan continued to produce numerous portraits throughout his life, generally in pen and ink. A large collection is found in his “Little Portraits of Famous Americans”, a miniature book from 1973.

== Consolidated Printing ==
In 1939, Logan began hosting “The Consolidated Hour”, a weekly series of radio talks on KSAL in which he talked about Kansas industries. Starting January 2, 1939, he introduced “The Colonel” in advertisements for Consolidated Printing and Stationery. The Colonel was a dapper cartoon gentleman in a long black frock coat and vest, sporting a Kentucky Colonel necktie, a wide-brimmed Stetson hat, a handlebar mustache, and a goatee. He offered short bits of homespun philosophy, “sometimes serious, sometimes merely amusing, but never bitter”. Logan himself describes The Colonel as a bit of Abe Lincoln, Will Rogers, Teddy Roosevelt and other characters he admired. A mainstay of Consolidated advertising, The Colonel appeared weekly in the Salina Journal for nearly 30 years. Logan both drew and wrote copy for the Colonel, becoming so identified with his creation that “The Colonel” became a widely used nickname among colleagues and friends. Indeed, as Logan himself was a Kentucky Colonel since 1934 and sometimes dressed the part, “The Colonel" was very much his alter ego.

Logan contributed a considerable amount of art to Consolidated's work products through the years, from small decoration to full illustrations. An advertising sheet contains numerous samples of his work. A postcard illustration of the Brookville Hotel in Brookville, Kansas, shows his use of the woodcut style.

== Firearms and ammunition ==
Since Logan was young he was interested in guns, whittling rifles and pistols as a boy on the farm. He collected his first antique firearm, a blunderbuss, in 1932. As his collection grew, Logan became an expert in firearms and ammunition, authoring and illustrating a number of books that continue to be standard historical references. He also contributed drawings and articles to the American Rifleman over a period of more than two decades. Logan became a popular lecturer in the Civil War Roundtable circuit as a noted collector and historian.

When Logan purchased a Smith & Wesson American .44 engraved “Texas Jack, Cottonwood Spring, 1872”, he learned all he could about John B. “Texas Jack” Omohundro, a colorful Old West showman and scout. The result was the book “Buckskin and Satin: The Life of Texas Jack (J.B. Omohundro)”.

Other gun-related texts:

- Cartridges: a Pictorial Digest of Small Arms Ammunition
- Hand Cannon to Automatic: A Pictorial Parade of Hand Arms
- The Little Book of Guns: A Chronology
- The Muzzle Loading Rifle Then and Now
- The Pictorial History of the Underhammer Gun

== Miniature books ==
Since his Consolidated Printing days Logan had been fascinated by the art and craft of printing and publishing. In 1940 he built a small-scale working model of Gutenberg's press out of wood for a display as part of the 500th Anniversary of Printing. In 1973 he purchased a Baby Reliance Hand Press and started a new career as a publisher of miniature books. The Log-Anne Press, named after him and his wife, operated out of a studio behind their Santa Ana home. The company published some 50 books.

== Collecting ==
Logan's interests were broad and found expression in a number of valuable collections. An early love was the Civil War, sparked when he learned his maternal grandfather had been active in that conflict. By 1967, he had a collection of over 600 antique guns and edged weapons, focused on the Civil War and other items. “My collection included … firearms, uniforms, badges, medical gear, battle rattle, souvenirs – anything that would present a picture of the times through the relics that were left.”

In the 1930s, Logan wrote to illustrators Herbert Johnson and J.N. “Ding” Darling, hoping to start a collection of cartoon art. He offered some of his work for theirs, and to his surprise, they agreed. He continued to barter his work for the works of others, amassing one of the greatest collections of cartoon and illustrator art from the 19th and 20th century. The cartoons are now in the special collections department at Kansas State University Library. Twelve oil paintings by American magazine illustrators are in the care of the Marianna Kistler Beach Museum of Art.

His other collections included:

- Rare 18 and 32 pound Sibley stoves
- A set of John Rogers Civil War sculptures
- Civil War era sabers and swords, including a sword from the Quantrill raid on Lawrence, Kansas
- Dime Novels

As well as:

- Mustache Cups
- Relics and Curios

== Activities ==
Except as noted, items are from “In Memoriam, Herschel C. Logan”.

Salinas, Kansas 1929-1968

- Art Director, Consolidated Printing and Stationery Co. for 37 years
- Chief, Auxiliary Police, World War II
- President, Salinas Rotary Club,1949–50
- Director, Salinas Chamber of Commerce
- President, Christian Laymen's Association
- Member, City Planning Board
- Secretary, Board of Trustees, Salina Public Library

State and national activities

- Board of Directors, Kansas State Historical Society
- Vice-president, American Society of Arms Collectors, 1955–56
- President, American Society of Arms Collectors, 1957–58
- Member of Board of Directors, American Society of Arms Collectors
- Fellow of the company, Military Historians and Collectors
- Member, Arms and Armour Society of England
- Life Member, Muzzle-Loading Rifle Association
- Contributing Editor, “The American Rifleman”
- Member, Los Angeles Corral of the Westerners
- Member, Company of Military Historians and “fellow” of the company

Memberships

- Salina Lodge No. 60 A.F. & A.M.
- Salina Consistory
- Salina Chapter No. 18 Royal Arch Masons
- Askelon Commandery No. 6, K.T.
- Isis Temple Shrine
- El Bandito Shrine Club, Santa Ana, California
- Past President, Los Compadres con Libros
- Trinity United Presbyterian Church, Santa Ana

== Works ==
- See List of works of Herschel C. Logan

== Exhibitions and awards ==
Year	Event and works	Ref
1925	1st Annual Kansas Artists Exhibition. Topeka	
1925	6th International Print Makers Exhibition, Los Angeles Museum Exhibition Park, March 1–29: Summer Afternoon	
1925	Midwestern Artists Exhibition, Kansas City Art Institute, Kansas City, Missouri, Feb 2-Mar 1: Rainy Day; The Blacksmith Shop	
1925	Philadelphia Art Alliance, Annual exhibition Dec 1925-Jan 1926: Lincoln Portrait	
1926	2nd Annual Exhibition, Artists Guild of Wichita: Barnyard; Barnyard in Winter; The Old Milk House; Evening Shadows; Farmyard; Old Print Shop; Church in the Valley; Deserted Barn	
1926	7th International Print Makers Exhibition, Los Angeles Museum Exhibition Park, March 2-April 4, 1926: Rainy Day	
1926	Midwestern Artists Exhibition, Kansas City Art Institute, Kansas City, Missouri: The Old Milkhouse; Evening Shadows; Barn-yard in Winter (Bronze Medal)	
1927	3rd Annual Kansas Artists Exhibition, Topeka	
1927	8th International Print Makers Exhibition, Los Angeles Museum Exhibition Park, March 1–31: Old Mission Ranchos De Tao; Evening Shadows	
1927	17th McPherson Exhibition	
1927	Midwestern Artists Exhibition, Kansas City Art Institute, Kansas City, Missouri, Feb 1-Mar 1: Deserted Barn; Mexican Farmyard; Church in the Valley; Old Mission, Ranchos de Taos (Bronze Medal)	
1928	9th International Print Makers Exhibition, Los Angeles Museum Exhibition Park, March 1–31, 1928: The Weaver	
1928	Library of Congress - Six wood block prints added to the permanent collection: Church in Winter; Kansas Wheat Field; Lindy; The Lost Hope; The Old Mission; The Weaver	
1928	Midwestern Artists Exhibition, Kansas City Art Institute, Kansas City, Missouri, Feb 1-Mar 1: The Weaver; Lost Hope	
1928	Wichita Artists’ Guild: The First Snow	
1929	5th Annual Kansas Artists Exhibition, Topeka	
1929	American Block Prints, Second Annual Exhibition, Mar 19–31, Wichita City Library, April at Mulvane Museum: Barn in Winter; The First Snow; Lincoln; Roosevelt	
1929	Kansas Free Fair, Topeka: The First Snow (First Prize) in group of 5	
1930	6th Annual Kansas Artists Exhibition, Topeka	
1930	11th International Print Makers Exhibition, Los Angeles Museum Exhibition Park, March 1–31, 1930: The First Snow	
1930	Kansas Free Fair, Topeka: Group of 5 prints (Second prize)	
1930	Midwestern Artists Exhibition, Kansas City Art Institute, Kansas City, Missouri, Feb 2-Mar 2: Summer Day; The First Snow (Silver Medal)	
1931	7th Annual Kansas Artists Exhibition, Topeka, Oct 17-Nov 9	
1931	12th International Print Makers Exhibition, Los Angeles Museum Exhibition Park, March: Fodder in the Shock	
1931	Kansas Free Fair, Topeka: Book plate (First Prize); Pen and Ink Pirate (Second prize)	
1931	Midwestern Artists Exhibition, Kansas City Art Institute, Kansas City, Missouri, Feb. 1-Mar 2: Fodder in the Shock; Snow; Barker Homestead	
1932	8th Annual Kansas Artists Exhibition, Topeka	
1932	Kansas Free Fair, Topeka: Book plate (First prize); Group of 5 prints (Second prize)	
1933	6th Annual American Blockprint Exhibition, Jan 8–17, Wichita City Library: Brick Plant; Hartley’s Elevator; A Kansas Landscape	
1933	9th Annual Kansas Artists Exhibition, Topeka: A Kansas Landscape; Sand Boat; Brick Plant; August Sunshine	
1933	Kansas Free Fair, Topeka: Group of 5 prints (First prize)	
1933	Midwestern Artists Exhibition, Kansas City Art Institute, Kansas City, Missouri: Sunlight Through the Trees (Honorable mention); Morning Sunlight	
1933	Prairie Print Exhibition of Wichita, Kansa, Municipal Clubhouse, March	
1934	Midwestern Artists Exhibition, Kansas City Art Institute, Kansas City, Missouri: On Fifth Street (Bronze Medal)	
1934	15th International Print Makers Exhibition, Los Angeles Museum Exhibition Park, March, 1934: On Fifth Street (Honorable mention); Old Corn Crib (Honorable mention)	
1934	Kansas Free Fair, Topeka: Group of 5 prints (Second prize)	
1934	Rocky Mountain Print Makers Exhibition, Chappell House, Denver: Morning Sunlight (Purchase prize); Sunlight Through the Trees (Purchase prize)	
1935	8th Annual American Block Print Exhibition, Jan 10–20, Wichita: Easter Snow; Lonely Farmhouse (Kansas Federation of Art, best blockprint)	
1935	16th International Print Makers Exhibition, Los Angeles Museum Exhibition Park, March, 1935: Trosper Homestead	
1935	Friends of Art, K.S.C.: Woodside Hut (Gift print, Kansas Federation of Art)	
1935	Kansas Free Fair, Topeka: Group of 3 prints (First prize)	
1935	Midwestern Artists Exhibition, Kansas City Art Institute, Kansas City, Missouri, Feb. 3-28: Easter Snow; Lonely Farmhouse	
1938	9th Annual American Block Print Exhibition, Nov 20-Dec 5, [Wichita]: Hillside Road; Hilltop Home; Monday Morning; Sod Shanty	
1936	17th International Print Makers Exhibition, Los Angeles Museum Exhibition Park, March, 1936: Hillside Road	
1936	Kansas Federation of Art, Prairie Print Makers collection, Apr-May 1	
1936	Kansas Free Fair, Topeka: Group of 3 prints (Second prize); Book plate (Montgomery) (First prize); Comm. Design (engine) (First prize); Lettering (Will Rogers) (First prize); Pen & Ink (Capital Bldg) (Third prize)	
1936	Midwestern Artists Exhibition, Kansas City Art Institute, Kansas City, Missouri, Feb 2-Mar 2: Trosper Homestead; Monday Morning	
1936	Print-Makers Society of California, traveling exhibit: The Bather	
1937	Midwestern Artists Exhibition, Kansas City Art Institute, Kansas City, Missouri: Hilltop Home (Third Prize, $10)	
1938	American Blockprint Exhibition, Wichita: Afternoon Shadows (Kansas Fed. of Art, best blockprint)	
1938	Brooks Memorial Art Gallery, Graphic Art, Memphis, Tennessee	
1938	Kansas Free Fair, Topeka: Group of 3 prints (Second prize)	
1939	Kansas Free Fair, Topeka: Group of 2 prints (First prize); Comm/ design (Berkowitz) (Third prize)	
1939	Midwestern Artists Exhibition, Kansas City Art Institute, Kansas City, Missouri, Feb 5-2: Afternoon Shadows; Victim of the Dust	
1939	New York World's Fair: Winter Day	
1939	Prairie Print Maker's Exhibit	
1939	Six States Exhibition [6th Annual], Joslyn Memorial Art Museum, Omaha	
1940	13th Annual American Block Prints and Lithographs Exhibition, Jan 2-Feb 2, [Wichita]: Sod House in Winter; Winter Day	
1940	Midwestern Artists Exhibition, Kansas City Art Institute, Kansas City, Missouri, Feb 4-25: Sod House in Winter; Summer Calm	
1940	Six States Exhibition [8th Annual], Joslyn Memorial Art Museum, Omaha	
1941	Printmakers Society of California, traveling exhibit Central Library, Los Angeles	
1941	Six States Exhibition [9th Annual], Joslyn Memorial Art Museum, Omaha	
1944	Prairie Print Makers traveling exhibition	
1954	Exhibit of Kansas Regional Print, Wharton Room, Manhattan Library	
1958	Prairie Print Makers traveling exhibition	
1984	Kennedy Galleries. Proofs of talent : American artists and the challenge of printmaking. May 1984: Morning Sunlight	
2007	Birger Sandzén Memorial Gallery 50th anniversary exhibition	
2018	Prints of the Prairie: Herschel Logan's Kansas. Nov 13–15, 2018, The Coutts Museum of Art, El Dorado, Kansas. (30 prints on display)	
2020	Telling a story : woodblock prints by Clare Leighton, J.J. Lankes, Herschel Logan. Jun 27-Nov 1, 2020, Wichita Art Museum, Ablah Gallery, Wichita, Kansas.	
2020	The Printmakers at Ranchos de Taos. Aug-Sep, 2020, William R. Talbot Fine Art, Santa Fe, New Mexico.: Old Mission, Rancho de Taos	

== Collections and archives ==
An extensive collection of over 1600 prints (published and unpublished), books, paintings, drawing, studies, sketchbooks, original wooden blocks and other artifacts, plus Logan's collection of cartoon and illustrator art, can be found at the Marianna Kistler Beach Museum of Art, Kansas State University. All their holdings have been digitized.

Additional collections:

- Amon Carter Museum of American Art, Research Library. Herschel Logan : Artist Files
- Charlotte M. Smith Collection of Miniature Books, University Archives, The University of Iowa Libraries: a large collection of Log-Anne Press and other miniature books
- Cleveland Museum of Art, Ingalls Library. Logan, Herschel C., 1901-. artist file
- Emprise Bank Art Gallery
- Kansas Museum of History
- Sandzén Memorial Art Gallery
- University of California, Irvine, Langson Library.The Westerners collection
- Ablah Library. Wichita State University, Artist File: Herschel C. Logan
- Wichita Art Museum, 170+ items including most of Logan's miniature books.

== Sources ==
- Baker, L.V. “Herschel C. Logan, Personality Profile”, Arms Gazette. North Hollywood, Calif., Bienfeld Pub. Co., Apr 1971.
- Baldwin, Sara M, and Robert M. Baldwin. Illustriana Kansas: Biographical Sketches of Kansas Men and Women of Achievement Who Have Been Awarded Life Membership in Kansas Illustriana Society. Hebron, Nebraska: Illustriana Incorporated, 1933. Print.
- Conrads, David, and Pamela Evans (Editors). The Prairie Print Makers. Exhibits USA, 2001
- Craig, Susan. Biographical Dictionary of Kansas Artists (active Before 1945). Lawrence, KS: Susan V. Craig, 2009. Internet resource. url:https://kuscholarworks.ku.edu/handle/1808/1028
- “From Printmaking to Making Books”, Tampa Book Arts Studio, 1 Apr. 2020.
- Krause, Rachel. “Herschel Logan's Intricate Wood Prints Take Viewers Back to Kansas' Dust Bowl Days”. Medium, Medium, 14 Oct. 2018. url: https://medium.com/@rachel_krause/herschel-logans-wood-prints-highlight-scenes-from-kansas-farmland-bb5fe64bcf8.
- Lehman, Anthony L. Herschel Logan: Man of Many Careers. (Los Angeles: Westerners, Los Angeles Corral, 1986).
- Midwestern Artists’ Exhibition (Kansas City: Kansas City Art Institute, 1920-1942
- Mines, Cynthia. For the Sake of Art: The Story of an Art Movement in Kansas. s.l. Mines, 1979.
- North, Cori Sherman. “In the Center of It All: 90 Years of the Prairie Print Makers”, [Lindsborg, Kansas]: The Birger Sandzén Memorial Foundation, 2020.
- O'Neill, Barbara T, George C. Foreman, and Howard W. Ellington. The Prairie Print Makers. 1984. Print.
- Reinbach, Edna, comp. “Kansas Art and Artists”, in Collections of the Kansas State Historical Society. v. 17, 1928. p. 571-585.
- Sain, Lydia, comp. Festival of Kansas Arts and Crafts. Catalog: Arts and Crafts of Kansas: an Exhibition held in Lawrence, Feb. 18-22, 1948 in the Community Building. Lawrence: World Co., 1948.
