= John Ross (chemist) =

Scientist in physical chemistry

- Born: October 2, 1926; Vienna, Austria
- Died: February 18, 2017 (aged 90)

Academic background
- Education: Queens College; Massachusetts Institute of Technology

Academic work
- Institutions: Brown University; Massachusetts Institute of Technology; Stanford University
- Doctoral students: Jennifer Logan

John Ross (October 2, 1926 – February 18, 2017) was a scientist in physical chemistry and the Camille and Henry Dreyfus Professor of Chemistry at Stanford University.

== Education and career ==
Born in Vienna in 1926, Ross left Austria with his parents only days before the outbreak of World War II. They settled in New York, where he studied chemistry at Queens College (B.S. 1948), with a two-year interruption to serve in the Army from 1944 to 1946. After completing his degree, he went on to perform doctoral research in physical chemistry, studying gas transport properties under the guidance of Isador Amdur at the Massachusetts Institute of Technology (Ph.D. 1951). This led to postdoctoral work in gas thermometry and the statistical mechanical theory of irreversible processes with physical chemist John Kirkwood at Yale. Ross began his faculty career as assistant professor in chemistry at Brown University in 1953. There, he launched a program to test the viscosity of liquids as a function of temperature and pressure with unprecedented precision. Two years later, he and physical chemist Edward Forbes Greene began nearly two decades of work developing the use of molecular beams to examine the molecular dynamics – revealing details of molecular collisions, dispersion, and more during chemical reactions. In 1966 Ross joined the chemistry department faculty at MIT, where he served as chair from 1966 to 1971. He came to Stanford in 1979 as professor of chemistry and was department chair from 1983 to 1989. Among many honors recognizing his broad contributions in physical chemistry, Professor Ross was named to the National Academy of Sciences and American Academy of Arts and Sciences and received the U.S. National Medal of Science in 2000 from President Clinton.

In his research at Stanford, Ross examined experimental and theoretical investigations in new approaches to the determination of complex reaction mechanisms, the formation of the thermodynamics and statistical mechanics of systems far from equilibrium, the chemical implementation of digital and parallel computers, and application of these studies to biological reaction mechanisms.

== Honors and awards ==
- Member of the National Academy of Sciences, 1976;
- Irving Langmuir Award in Chemical Physics, American Chemical Society, 1992;
- Dean's Award for Distinguished Teaching, Stanford University, 1992–93;
- National Medal of Science, 1999;
- Peter Debye Award in Physical Chemistry, American Chemical Society, 2001;
- Austrian Cross of Honor for Science and Art, 1st class, 2002;
- ACS Theodore William Richards Medal, 2004
