= Maurice R. Bebb =

Maurice R. Bebb (1891–1986) (or M. R. Bebb as he signed his work) was a notable etcher and printmaker of the American Midwest, whose best-known subjects were birds native to Oklahoma and Minnesota, where he spent his time. Etching involves using copper plates on which an artist has etched or “bitten” his picture with acid. Color etchings like Bebb's require two to four copper plates, each is inked with one or more different colors and printed one over the other to produce the finished picture. Technically, the process is called multi-plate soft-ground and aquatint etching.

== Synopsis ==
Bebb was born in Chicago in 1891. Grandchild of Michael Schuck Bebb, noted Botanist, and great-grandson of William Bebb, former Governor of Ohio. He graduated from the University of Illinois in 1913 and moved to Muskogee, Oklahoma, where he lived the rest of his life. By profession, he was a florist and had no formal art training. He established a florist business in Muskogee and married his first wife, Helen. In his early 50s, he began to draw, and later wrote a friend that he had always been an artist but didn’t realize it until later in life. His second wife, Kappa Bebb, said his ability to sketch came "as natural as breathing." He studied original prints from other artists and read technical manuals, then began working on copper plates around 1943. At that time he befriended and received encouragement from Charles M. Capps, Arthur W. Hall, Leon R. Pescheret, F. Leslie Thompson and other well-established printmakers of the time, most of whom had formal training and had studied color etching in Europe or with master printmakers. Charles M. Capps was a charter member of the Prairie Print Makers, a group Bebb later joined.

== Printmaking ==
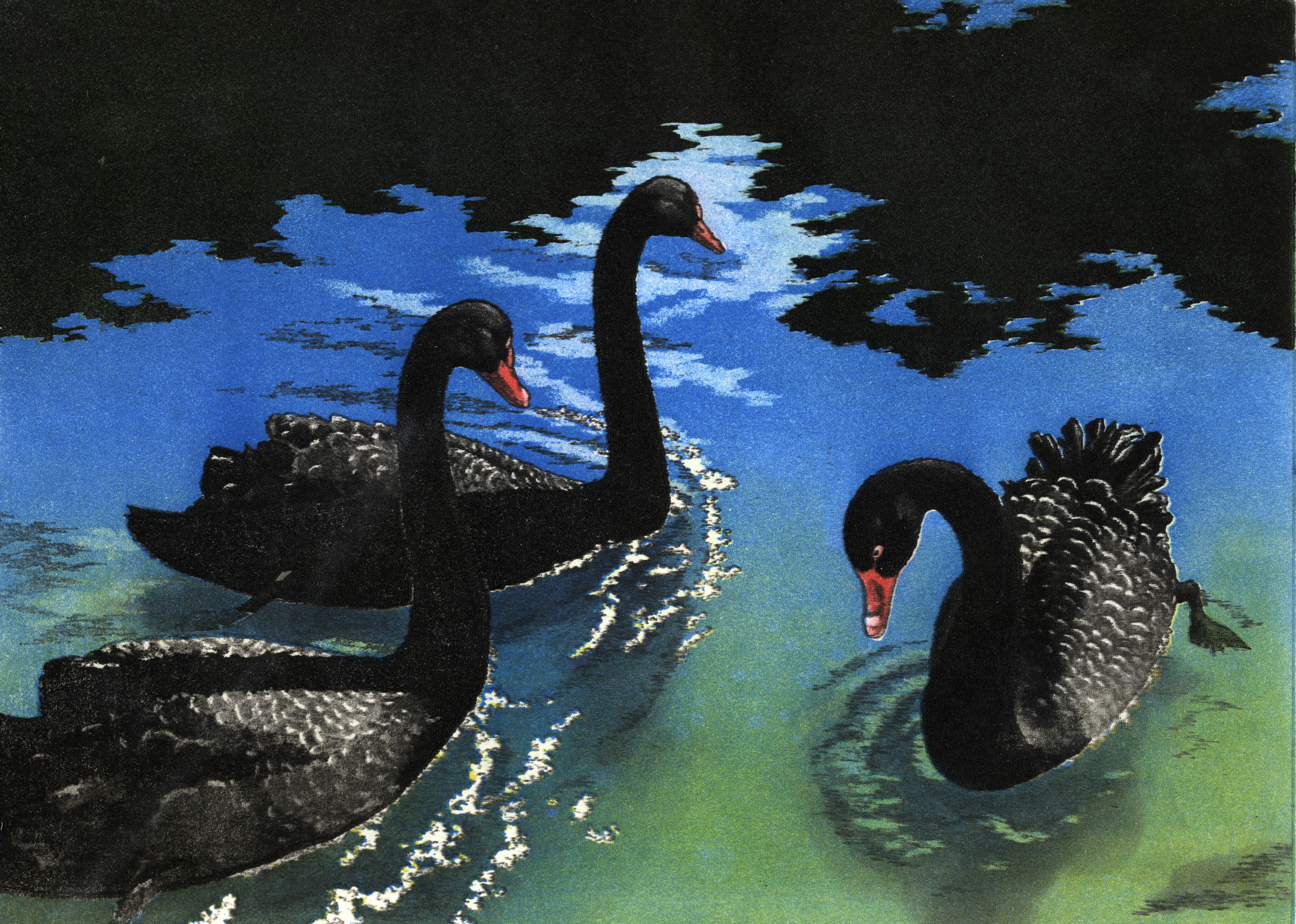
A color aquatint and softground etching by M. R. Bebb, 1952

In 1951, at the age of 60, Bebb retired from his florist business to devote himself full-time to his art. "I wanted to paint and draw for years before I had the nerve to dirty a piece of paper," he mused. He traveled to Europe twice, once for eight months and a second time for six months, and took advantage of the long-standing presence of printmakers in Europe to secure copper plates, inks and other supplies. Unlike most printmakers, Bebb was largely self-taught, through trial and error and seeking technical advice when possible. Some of his most dramatic and complex works were a result of this time in Europe, including Italian Wine Bottles (1957), Chateau Carennac and Argenton-sur-Creuse (both 1958). Bebb’s first etchings were exhibited in 1949 and he enjoyed instant success. The following year, he received the Purchase Prize of the Graphic Chemical Company at the Chicago Annual Exhibition. The Print Makers Society of California selected his print Black Swans (1952) for their 1953 publication. His color etching of Yellow-Throated Warbler was chosen as the 44th presentation print and presented to associate members of the Chicago Society of Etchers in 1954. Then, in 1960, his print White-Breasted Nuthatch was selected for the thirtieth publication of the Prairie Print Makers. Nan Sheets, fellow artist and the first Oklahoman to be included in the annual publication of Who's Who in American Art, wrote, “In Mr. Bebb we have an artist of recognition who pays attention to true perspective, clarity of design, rhythm of modulated line, and who is an expert draftsman...The Bebb pencil drawings are not quickly executed sketches but carefully considered works, with proper consideration of pencil technique...He excels not only because he is able to draw, but because he has mastered the various methods employed in making etchings. The fact that he has artistic ability to portray what he sees, and as simply as possible, places him high among his fellow artists”.

== 2011 ==
In January 2011, students at Sadler Arts Academy in Muskogee, OK received a grant from The Kennedy Center to make a short film about Bebb. Bebb created over 175 subjects and today his work can be found in several permanent collections including those of Cornell University and the University of Kansas.

== Chronology ==
1891 Born in Chicago IL
1909 Graduated Calumet High School
1917 Serves as 1st Lieutenant at Camp Pike, AR
1918 Promoted to Captain, United States Army
1918 Marries Helen Susan Van Arsdale in Madison WI
1924-1925 President, Oklahoma State Florist Association
1943 Begins experimenting with copper plates
1949 Four works appear in the 39th Annual Chicago Society of Etchers exhibition
1950 Receives the Graphic Chemical and Ink Co. Purchase Prize at the 40th Annual Chicago Society of Etchers exhibition
1951 Retires from florist business to focus on printmaking
1953 Creates gift print for the Print Makers Society of California (Black Swans)
1954 Yellow-throated Warbler is the presentation print for the Chicago Society of Etchers
1955 Exhibits work in the 10th Annual Exhibition of the Print Makers Society of California
1956 Travels in Europe
1958 Travels in Europe
1976 Oklahoma Today publishes four prints in the Winter issue
1983 Exhibition at the Heard Natural Science Museum and Wildlife Sanctuary
1986 Dies
