= Henry Logan =

Henry Logan may refer to:

- Henry Logan (basketball) (1946–2023), American basketball player
- Henry Logan (politician) (1784–1866), American politician
- Harry Logan (1888–?), Scottish footballer
