= Don Logan (disambiguation) =

Don or Donald Logan may refer to:

- Sir Donald Logan (1917–2009), British diplomat
- Don Logan (rugby union) (1931–2003), Australian rugby union player
- Don Logan (born 1944), American media executive
- F. Donald Logan (1930–2022), American historian
