= Norma Bassett Hall =

American printmaker

- Born: Norma Bassett; May 21, 1889; Halsey, Oregon
- Died: May 1, 1957 (aged 67); Santa Fe, New Mexico
- Education: Pacific Northwest College of Art; Art Institute of Chicago
- Known for: Woodblock prints, painting
- Movement: Prairie Print Makers
- Spouse: Arthur William Hall

Norma Bassett Hall (1889–1957) was an American printmaker. She was a woodblock printmaker and often depicted landscapes and outdoor scenes.

== Early life and education ==
Norma Bassett Hall was born in 1889 in Halsey, Oregon to William and Mary Bassett (née Russell). In 1910, she became a member of the inaugural class of the Museum Art School (now the Pacific Northwest College of Art) in Portland, Oregon. After leaving Portland, she briefly taught in Milwaukee, Wisconsin, before continuing her education at the School of the Art Institute of Chicago from 1915-1918. She also studied privately with the noted British printmaker Mabel Royds.

While studying at the SAIC, Norma Bassett met and would later marry Arthur William Hall, a fellow student and artist known today as an etcher and watercolorist. She lived much of her life in Kansas and New Mexico.

== Career and adult life ==
Following their marriage, Norma Bassett and Arthur Hall made their home in Kansas, becoming deeply involved with the state's flourishing printmaking culture and helping to found the Prairie Print Makers. Hall, the only female among the group's eleven charter members, designed their distinctive logo—a monogram set within a stylized sunflower. Like many members of the Prairie Print Makers, Hall and her husband divided their time (and their landscape subjects) between the rolling hills of Kansas and the dramatic vistas of New Mexico. In 1944 the couple permanently relocated to New Mexico, living first in Santa Fe, and eventually purchasing an estate near Alcade, New Mexico, from which they operated an art school. Bassett Hall continued to work and teach from their estate until her death in 1957.

== Public collections ==
- Smithsonian American Art Museum
- Bibliotheque Nationale
- California State Library
- University of Wichita

== Exhibitions ==
Dr. Joby Patterson, the author of Norma Bassett Hall: Catalogue Raisonné of Block Prints and Serigraphs, has curated numerous exhibitions on Hall.
