= George Logan =

George Logan may refer to:

- George Logan (Pennsylvania politician) (1753–1821), American physician and U.S. senator for Pennsylvania
- George Washington Logan (1815–1889), North Carolina politician and Confederate Congress member
- George Logan (soccer) (c. 1933–2009), collegiate head soccer coach
- George Logan (minister) (1678–1755), Scottish minister and controversialist
- George Logan (Australian politician) (1884–1953), member of the Queensland Legislative Assembly
- George Logan (Connecticut politician) (born 1969), member of the Connecticut State Senate
- George Logan (performer), (1944–2023), British performer, of the comedy act Hinge and Bracket
- George Pettit (born 1982), also known as George Logan, vocalist in the band Alexisonfire
- George Logan, a fictional character from Scary Movie 3
