= List of works of Herschel C. Logan =

This is a list of works by artist Herschel C. Logan.

Most of Logan's prints had a consistent title corresponding to his own typed inventories and usually found on the prints. But variations do exist across copies, and some prints had limited copies with no explicit title. Museums, galleries and auction houses can often provide a working title. Alternate titles can also arise when a print is published in another context. For instance, reproductions used in Logan's own book "Other Days in Pictures and Verse" have descriptive titles that apply to the print and verse together. Such assigned/alternative titles are indicated by a parenthesized name, with "also known as" shown as "aka".

== Key to online images ==
A	In collection of the Amon Carter Museum of American Art
B	In collection of Kansas State University, Marianna Kistler Beach Museum of Art
M	In collection of the Kansas Memory, Kansas Historical Society
S	Found in Logans's personal woodcut scrapbook
W	In collection of the Wichita Art Museum
X	At auction at referenced URL

== Woodcuts ==
(Adobe and Tree)	woodcut	1925	2 1/8 x 1 3/4 in (5.4 x 4.45 cm)	B
Admiral Byrd	woodcut	1936		M
After-glow (aka Afterglow)	woodcut	1934	5 x 7 in (12.70 x 17.78 cm)	B
Afternoon Shadows	woodcut	1938	9 x 7 in (22.86 x 17.78 cm)	B
Apple Blossoms	woodcut	1927	5 x 4 in (12.70 x 10.16 cm)	B
Approaching Storm	woodcut	1930	7 x 7 in (17.78 x 17.78 cm)	B W
August Sunshine	woodcut	1932		B
Autumn	color woodcut	1924	2 1/2 x 4 1/4 in (6.35 x 10.80 cm)	W M
Back Porch	woodcut	1928	5 1/16 x 6 3/4 in (12.86 x 17.15 cm)	B W M
Barber Shop	woodcut	1927		B W
Barker Homestead (aka Old Homestead)	woodcut	1930	6 x 8 7/8 in (15.24 x 22.54 cm)	W
Barn in Winter	woodcut	1928		B
Barnyard (aka Barnyard at Home)	woodcut	1926	4 1/2 x 5 1/2 in (11.43 x 13.97 cm)	B W
Barn-yard	woodcut	1932		B
Barnyard in Winter	woodcut	1926	3 1/2 x 5 1/2 in (8.89 x 13.97 cm)	B W
Barnyard, New Mexico	woodcut	c. 1926	4 x 6 in (10.16 x 15.24 cm)	X
The Bather	woodcut	1934	6 1/2 x 6 1/2 in (16.51 x 16.51 cm)	B
Blacksmith (aka At the Forge)	woodcut	1927	2 1/2 x 3 in (6.35 x 7.62 cm)	B W
The Boats	woodcut	1922	5 3/4 x 3 1/4 in (14.61 x 8.26 cm)	W
Boyhood Home - Winfield	woodcut	1921	6 1/2 x 14 in (16.51 x 35.56 cm)	B
Brick Plant	woodcut	1932	4 1/2 x 7 7/16 in (11.43 x 18.89 cm)	B
Buildings Through Windows	woodcut block	mid-century		B
California or Bust (aka The Forty-niners)	woodcut	1921-22	3 9/16 x 4 15/16 in (9.05 x 12.54 cm)	B W
Chick Allison	woodcut	1931	6 1/2 x 4 in (16.51 x 10.16 cm)	B
Christus	woodcut	1934	9 x 7 in (22.86 x 17.78 cm)	B
Church in the Valley (aka Church in Winter, The Country Church)	woodcut	1926	4 x 6 in (10.16 x 15.24 cm)	B W
Col. Bob Timmons	woodcut	1930	6 x 4 in (15.24 x 10.16 cm)	B W
Country Depot (aka The Old Depot)	woodcut	1924	4 x 6 in (10.16 x 15.24 cm)	B W M
Country Hotel (aka Palace Hotel, The Old Palace Hotel)	woodcut	1925	4 x 6 in (10.16 x 15.24 cm)	B W
Country School House (aka The Old Schoolhouse)	woodcut	1928	4 x 6 in (10.16 x 15.24 cm)	B W
Country Store #1	woodcut	1922		S
Country Store #2 (aka General Store)	woodcut	1923	4 x 6 in (10.16 x 15.24 cm)	B W M
Craftmen's Club cover	color woodcut	1922	7 1/4 x 5 3/16 in (18.42 x 13.18 cm)	W
Creek in Winter	woodcut	1928	5 x 7 1/8 in (12.70 x 18.10 cm)	B W
Deserted Barn	woodcut	1926	3 x 5 1/4 in (7.62 x 13.34 cm)	B W
Deserted Shanty	woodcut	1923	4 1/8 x 5 3/8 in (10.48 x 13.65 cm)	B W
District School	woodcut	1934		B M
The Doorway	woodcut	1924	3 1/4 x 3 in (8.26 x 7.62 cm)	B W M
Dust Storm	woodcut	1938	7 x 9 in (17.78 x 22.86 cm)	W M
Easter Snow	woodcut	1934	5 1/2 x 8 in (13.97 x 20.32 cm)	B
Evening Shadows	woodcut	1926	3 1/2 x 5 1/4 in (8.89 x 13.34 cm)	W
(Factory) (aka Industry)	woodcut	c. 1925	6 x 5 3/4 in (15.24 x 14.61 cm)	B W
A Familiar Landmark	woodcut	1932	4 x 4 in (10.16 x 10.16 cm)	X
(Farm with Big Sky) (aka Farm at Sunset)	woodcut	1927	2 1/2 x 3 in (6.35 x 7.62 cm)	B W
(Farm with Windmill)	woodcut	1920-30	3 9/16 x 4 1/2 in (9.05 x 11.43 cm)	W
Farmyard (aka Farm-yard)	woodcut	1926	5 x 8 in (12.70 x 20.32 cm)	W
Feeding Time	woodcut	1923	4 x 6 in (10.16 x 15.24 cm)	B W
The Fighter (Jack Dempsey)	woodcut	1930	5 x 3 15/16 in (12.70 x 10.00 cm)	W M
The First Snow	woodcut	1928	7 x 9 in (17.78 x 22.86 cm)	W
Fish	woodcut	1927	3 3/4 x 3 3/4 in (9.53 x 9.53 cm)	B W
Fodder in the Shock	woodcut	1930	4 15/16 x 7 in (12.54 cm x 17.78 cm)	W M
Franklin	woodcut	1923	5 3/8 x 3 3/4 in (13.65 x 9.53 cm)	W
Full Moon and Path Uphill	woodcut block	mid-century	5 15/16 x 3 7/8 in (15.08 x 9.84 cm)	B
Geese	woodcut	1927	4 x 6 in (10.16 x 15.24 cm)	W M
The Grim Reaper	woodcut`	1927	3 1/2 x 2 5/16 in (8.89 x 5.87 cm)	B W
Hartley’s Elevator	woodcut	1932	5 1/2 x 7 in (13.97 x 17.78 cm)	B M
Harvest	woodcut	1924	3 1/4 x 2 1/2 in (8.26 x 6.35 cm)	B W
Haying (aka Unloading Hay, Haybarn)	woodcut	1926	4 3/4 x 5 1/2 in (12.07 x 13.97 cm)	W S
Hillside Road	woodcut	1934	5 15/16 x 8 in (15.08 x 20.32 cm)	B
Hilltop Home	woodcut	1934	6 x 8 in (15.24 x 20.32 cm)	B
House in Assam	woodcut	1927	5 x 3 in (12.70 x 7.62 cm)	B W
(House in Snow)	woodcut	1920-30	5 1/8 x 8 in (13.02 x 20.32 cm)	W
In the Ozark Foothills	woodcut	1923	2 1/2 x 4 in (6.35 x 10.16 cm)	B W
(Indian on Horseback)		1921		S
Iron Eyes Cody	woodcut	1981	6 x 4 in (15.24 x 10.16 cm)	B
Japanese Study	woodcut	1923	2 1/2 x 3 1/2 in (6.35 x 8.89 cm)	B W
Kansas Hills	woodcut	1934	5 x 7 in (12.70 x 17.78 cm)	B M
A Kansas Landscape	woodcut	1932		B
Kansas Sunflower	woodcut	1984	6 x 4 15/16 in (15.24 x 12.57 cm)	B W
A Kansas Wheatfield	woodcut	1923	4 x 6 in (10.16 x 15.24 cm)	B M
The Knockout	woodcut	1930	5 1/4 x 5 7/8 in (13.34 x 14.92 cm)	B W
Lincoln	woodcut	1923	5 3/8 x 3 3/4 in (13.65 x 9.53 cm)	S
Lincoln (#2)	woodcut	1927	5 5/16 x 3 11/16 in (13.49 x 9.37 cm)	W
Lindy	woodcut	1927	7 x 5 in (17.78 x 12.70 cm)	W
Livery Stable (aka Old Livery Stable, The Star Livery)	woodcut	1925	4 x 6 in (10.16 x 15.24 cm)	B W
Lone Elm	woodcut	1925	4 x 3 1/2 in (10.16 x 8.89 cm)	B W
Lonely Farmhouse	woodcut	1934	8 x 8 in (20.32 x 20.32 cm)	B
Lonely Tree	woodcut	c. 1925	2 1/2 x 3 in (6.35 x 7.62 cm)	W
Lost Hope	woodcut	1927	9 x 7 in (22.86 x 17.78 cm)	W M
(McCormick-Armstrong Building)	woodcut	1920-30	4 1/2 x 3 in (11.43 x 7.62 cm)	W
Meadow Land	woodcut	1934	5 x 7 in (12.70 x 17.78 cm)	B M
Meditation	woodcut	1927	3 3/4 x 3 3/4 in (9.53 x 9.53 cm)	B W M
Mexican Farmyard (aka Barnyard, New Mexico)	woodcut	1926	4 x 6 in (10.16 x 15.24 cm)	B W
Monday Morning	woodcut	1934	5 x 7 in (12.70 x 17.78 cm)	B M
Morning Sunlight	woodcut	1932	5 1/2 x 7 in (13.97 x 17.78 cm)	B W
The Nativity	woodcut	1924	2 7/8 x 2 5/8 in (7.30 x 6.67 cm)	B W
Noonday Rest	woodcut	1938		B M
Nude	woodcut	1930	5 x 3 in (12.70 x 7.62 cm)	B W
Old Blacksmith Shop	woodcut	1925	4 1/16 x 6 in (10.32 x 15.24 cm)	B W
The Old Bridge	woodcut	1925		S
Old Cabin (woodcut #2)	woodcut	1925	4 x 6 in (10.16 x 15.24 cm)	B
(Old Cabin)	woodcut	1921-22	2 5/8 x 4 in (6.67 x 10.16 cm)	B W
Old Corn Crib	woodcut	1932	4 15/16 x 7 1/16 in (12.54 x 17.94 cm)	B
Old Covered Bridge	woodcut	1930	5 x 7 in (12.70 x 17.78 cm)	B W
Old Farmhouse	woodcut	1938		A
The Old Gate	woodcut	1927	6 x 5 in (15.24 x 12.70 cm)	B W
Old Henry House (no image found, may reference another print)	woodcut			X
Old Man of Pyramid Lake (aka Profile Rock)	woodcut	1973	2 1/2 x 2 1/16 in (6.35 x 5.24 cm)	B W
Old Milkhouse (aka Old Milk House)	woodcut	1926	4 3/4 x 4 in (12.07 x 10.16 cm)	B W
Old Mission, Rancho de Taos	woodcut	1926	4 x 6 3/4 in (10.16 x 17.15 cm)	W
Old Print Shop (aka The Tribune Printery)	woodcut	1925	4 x 5 in (10.16 x 12.70 cm)	B W
The Old Smoke House	woodcut	c. 1928	6 1/8 x 7 1/2 in (15.56 x 19.05 cm)	B W
Old Tunnel Mill	woodcut	1921	7 x 3 in (17.78 x 7.62 cm)	W
On Fifth Street	woodcut	1932	5 1/2 x 7 in (13.97 x 17.78 cm)	B
Opera House (aka Old Opera House)	woodcut	1925	4 x 6 in (10.16 x 15.24 cm)	B W
Pharoh	woodcut	1923	5 1/4 x 3 5/8 in (13.34 x 9.21 cm)	B
Pirate	woodcut	1927	2 7/8 x 2 1/2 in (7.30 x 6.35 cm)	B W
Pirate #2	woodcut	1927	1 1/2 x 3/4 in (3.81 x 1.91 cm)	S
Pirate Chief	woodcut	1927	4 1/2 x 2 1/2 in (11.43 x 6.35 cm)	B W
The Press	woodcut	1923	3 x 4 1/2 in (7.62 x 11.43 cm)	B
Rainy Day	woodcut	1924	4 x 3 5/8 in (10.16 x 9.21 cm)	B W M
Richardson Hall	woodcut	1922	5 x 8 in (12.70 x 20.32 cm)	B W
Roosevelt (First try)	woodcut	1927		S
(Sailing Ship)	woodcut	1924	4 x 2 1/2 in (10.16 x 6.35 cm)	W
Sandboat	woodcut	1932	5 x 8 in (12.70 x 20.32 cm)	B
(Schoolhouse in Snow)	woodcut	mid-century	4 x 3 in (10.16 x 7.62 cm)	B
Self Portrait (first try)	woodcut	1928		S
Self Portrait (#2)	woodcut	1928	5 x 3 1/2 in (12.70 x 8.89 cm)	B W
The Sentinel	woodcut	1927	3 3/4 x 3 in (9.53 x 7.62 cm)	B W
Sis (aka Sis and Her Dog)	woodcut	1921	5 1/4 x 3 3/4 in (13.34 x 9.53 cm)	B W
Snow	woodcut	1930	4 x 6 7/8 in (10.16 x 17.46 cm)	B W M
(Snowy Scene)	woodcut	1920-30	2 5/8 x 4 5/8 in (6.67 x 11.75 cm)	W
Sod House in Winter	woodcut	1938	7 x 9 in (17.78 x 22.86 cm)	B W
Sod Shanty	woodcut	1934	5 x 7 in (12.70 x 17.78 cm)	B M
Solitude	woodcut	1927	3 3/8 x 4 3/4 in (8.57 x 12.07 cm)	B W
Sorghum Mill	woodcut	1938	5 x 7 in (12.70 x 17.78 cm)	B W M
Spring Song	woodcut	1932		B
Squirrel	woodcut	1927	4 5/16 x 4 1/4 in (10.95 x 10.80 cm)	W
(Stagecoach in Snow)	woodcut	c. 1924	2 3/4 x 5 in (6.99 x 12.70 cm)	B
Stone Bridge	woodcut	1923	3 x 2 1/4 in (7.62 x 5.72 cm)	B W M
Stoney Hillside	woodcut	c. 1928		B
Summer Afternoon	woodcut	1923	3 3/4 x 5 1/4 in (9.53 x 13.34 cm)	W M
Summer Calm	woodcut	1938	9 1/16 x 7 in (23.02 x 17.78 cm)	B
Summer Day	woodcut	1937	3 3/4 x 4 7/8 in (9.53 x 12.38 cm)	W
Summer Evening	woodcut	1923	3 x 2 1/4 in (7.62 x 5.72 cm)	W M
Summer Night	woodcut	1932	4 x 6 in (10.16 x 15.24 cm)	B
Sunlight through the Trees	woodcut	1932	4 7/8 x 6 1/2 in (12.38 x 16.51 cm)	B
Temple of Karnak	woodcut	1923	5 3/16 x 3 1/2 in (13.18 x 8.89 cm)	W
Thatched Cottage	woodcut	1927	3 3/8 x 4 7/8 in (8.57 x 12.38 cm)	B W
Threshing	woodcut	1938	7 1/16 x 9 in (17.92 x 22.86 cm)	W
Toadstool Rocks	color woodcut	1936	6 1/2 x 5 in (16.51 x 12.70 cm)	W
The Toiler	woodcut	1927	2 1/2 x 2 7/8 in (6.35 x 7.30 cm)	B W
Tornado	woodcut	1938	9 1/16 x 7 in (23.02 x 17.78 cm)	W M
Town Pump	woodcut	1926	4 x 6 in (10.16 x 15.24 cm)	B W
Tree (aka "My first woodcut")	woodcut	1921	1 5/8 x 1 3/8 in (4.13 x 3.49 cm)	B W
Tree (à la Sandzén) (aka Old Tree)	nailhead woodcut	1928	4 x 6 in (10.16 x 15.24 cm)	B W
(Tree with Arroyo)	woodcut	1927	2 9/16 x 3 in (6.51 x 7.62 cm)	B
Trosper Homestead	woodcut	1934		M
Twilight	woodcut	1923	2 1/2 x 4 7/8 in (6.35 x 12.38 cm)	B W M
United Traction System (aka Truck)	woodcut	c. 1925	3 x 6 in (7.62 x 15.24 cm)	B W
Valley Home	woodcut	1934	5 x 7 in (12.70 x 17.78 cm)	B M
Valley of the Kings	woodcut	1923	4 1/16 x 2 1/2 in (10.32 x 6.35 cm)	W
Victim of the Dust	woodcut	1938	7 x 9 in (17.78 x 22.86 cm)	B M
Country Bank (aka Village Bank)	woodcut	1927	4 x 6 in (10.16 x 15.24 cm)	B W
Washington	woodcut	1925	5 1/4 x 3 7/8 in (13.34 x 9.84 cm)	W
The Weaver	woodcut	1927	7 x 6 in (17.78 x 15.24 cm)	W
Wheatfield	woodcut	1920-30	3 15/16 x 6 1/16 in (10.00 x 15.39 cm)	W
Who-o-e-e	woodcut	1930	4 x 6 in (10.16 x 15.24 cm)	B W
Will Rogers	woodcut	1936	6 x 4 in (15.24 x 10.16 cm)	W
The Wind	woodcut	1927	3 1/2 x 3 1/2 in (8.89 x 8.89 cm)	B W
Winter	woodcut	1922	2 3/4 x 8 in (6.99 x 20.32 cm)	W
Winter Day	woodcut	1938	9 1/16 x 12 in (23.02 x 30.48 cm)	B W
Winter Evening	woodcut	1924	4 3/4 x 7 1/2 in (12.07 x 19.05 cm)	W
Winter Moonlight	woodcut	1932	5 x 8 in (12.70 x 20.32 cm)	X
Woman Lying Down	woodcut block	mid-century	4 15/16 x 8 7/8 in (12.57 x 22.54 cm)	B
Woodland Byway	woodcut	1938	7 x 9 in (17.78 x 22.86 cm)	B
Woodside Hut	woodcut	1935	4 x 6 in (10.16 x 15.24 cm)	B

== Etchings, Lithographs and Linocuts ==
Deep Winter (aka Heavy Snow)	etching and drypoint	2 11/16 x 4 5/8 in (6.83 x 11.75 cm)	c. 1925	B W
(Farmhouse)	lithograph	5 7/8 x 8 1/4 in (14.92 x 20.96 cm)	1920-30	W
Home Place	linocut	4 1/8 x 4 7/8 in (10.48 x 12.38 cm)	1920-30	B W
Old Shed	etching with drypoint	2 5/16 x 4 in (5.87 x 10.16 cm)	c. 1925	B
A Relic of the Plains	lithograph	7 3/4 x 9 1/2 in (19.69 x 24.13 cm)	c. 1940	B W
Summer Afternoon	lithograph	5 7/8 x 9 7/16 in (14.92 x 23.97 cm)	c. 1923	B
Toadstool Rocks	lithograph	9 x 8 1/16 in (22.86 x 20.48 cm)	c. 1936	B
(untitled) (compare woodcut "Adobe and Trees")	etching	6 x 8 ¼ in (15.24 x 20.96 cm)	1920-30	W
(winter street scene with hay sled)	drypoint	5 ¾ in x 3 5/16 in (14.61 cm x 8.41 cm)	1920-30	B

== Commercial Works ==
Logan contributed a great deal in design, decoration and illustration to his work at Consolidated Printing. The firm published historical and inspirational books illustrated by Logan, as well as advertising cards and calendars of famous Americans as drawn by him. Some stand alone as singular works. Examples:

Pictorial map of Kansas, offset lithograph. Published by American Ass'n. of University Women. Salina, Kansas Branch. Copyrighted 1930. Art work by Herschel C. Logan. Engraved by the Mid. Continent Engraving Company, Salina-Wichita. Printed by the Consolidated Printing & Stationery Company, Salina, Kansas, copyright 1930	online
Romance of the Old West [map], Consolidated Printing, lithograph 1955, (KSU)	online
The Kansas Pacific, lithograph, Consolidated Printing, 1953	online
Through Kansas On U.S. Highway 40, Poster Stamp Publishing Co., Chicago, Illinois. Sponsored by the U.S. 40 Highway Association -- 24 poster stamps honoring Kansas, printed in 2 colors	

== Books (as author and/or illustrator) ==
Logan, Herschel C. 12 Famous Americans. Salina, Kan: Consolidated-Salina, 1936. Print. Includes the following portraits from original woodcuts: W. F. Cody (Buffalo Bill); Thomas Edison; Benjamin Franklin; Thomas Jefferson; John Paul Jones; Robert E. Lee; Abraham Lincoln; John Marshall; Will Rogers; Theodore Roosevelt; George Washington; Woodrow Wilson; Also printed as a calendar, and a card set with an added Alexander Graham Bell portrait.	
Logan, Herschel C, and Ruth E. Adomeit. "30": (a Mini History). Santa Ana, Calif: Log-Anne Press, 1983. Print.	miniature
Logan, Herschel C. The American Hand Press: Its Origin, Development, and Use. Whittier, Calif: C. Zoller Press, 1980. Print	
Logan, Herschel C, and M Frederick Iserman. Art in Advertising. Salina, Kansas : The Consolidated Printing and Stationery Co., 1931. Print	
Lincoln, Abraham, Herschel C. Logan (il.). The Bear Hunt. Skokie, Ill: Black Cat Press, 1982. Print. - “Sketch by Herschel Logan.”	miniature
Logan, Herschel C. Buckskin and Satin: The Life of Texas Jack (j.b. Omohundro) Buckskin Clad Scout, Indian Fighter, Plainsman, Cowboy, Hunter, Guide, and Actor, and His Wife, Mlle. Morlacchi, Premiere Danseuse in Satin Slippers. Harrisburg, Pa: Stackpole Co, 1954. Print.	
Logan, Herschel C. Cartridges: a Pictorial Digest of Small Arms Ammunition. New York: Bonanza Books, 1959.	
Serven, James E. (ed.). The Collecting of Guns. Harrisburg, Pennsylvania: Stackpole Books, 1964. Print. – Herschel C. Logan, one of "23 successful experts" "giving you inside tips" (from an ad in Guns Magazine, December 1964, p. 11)	
Logan, Herschel C, and Pall W. Bohne. The Colonel Cal'ates. Los Angeles : Dawson's Book Shop, 1972. Print. online	miniature
Logan, Herschel C. The Colonel (of the Smoky Hills): His Filosophy. Salina, Kan: Consolidated Print. & Stationery Co, 1966. Print. Online	
Serven, James E. Colt Firearms, 1836-1960. Prescott, Ariz: Wolfe Pub. Co, 1991. Print. – “Herschel C. Logan, collector-author-artist, merits especial praise for his patient copying of the Colt cylinder engravings, and for the faithful production of other art work in this book.”	
Logan, Herschel C. The Coyote Road Edition (Yearbook). Salina, Kan: Kansas Wesleyan University, 1930. Print. -- Including 8 original woodcuts, some tipped in by Herschel Logan	
Logan, Herschel C, and Ruth E. Adomeit. The Digits. Santa Ana, Calif: Log-Anne Press, 1980. Print.	miniature
Logan, Herschel C. Dime Novels. Santa Ana, Calif: Log-Anne Press, 1984. Print.	miniature
Logan, Herschel C. The Drummer Boy of Shiloh. Fullerton, Calif.: Lorson's Books & Prints, 1986. Print.	miniature
Logan, Herschel C, and Ruth E. Adomeit. Ed Rush: A Tribute. Fullerton, Calif: Lorson's Books & Prints, 1987. Print.	
Curran, John P, Ruth E. Adomeit, and Herschel C. Logan. Eternal Vigilance: 1776-1976. Santa Ana, Cal. : Log-Anne Press, 1975. Print.	miniature
Logan, Herschel C, and Ruth E. Adomeit. Faith. Santa Ana, Calif: Log-Anne Press, 1984. Print.	miniature
Logan, Herschel C. Footprints in the Sand (author Unknown). Santa Ana, Calif: Log-Anne Press, 1983. Print.	miniature
Logan, Herschel C, and Ruth E. Adomeit. Frank Myrle Cushing, Printer. Santa Ana, Calif: Log-Anne Press, 1977. Print.	miniature
Logan, Herschel C. Great Names in Printing Through Six Centuries. Unpublished book project from c. 1935, containing the following identified portraits: Jost Amman; John Baskerville; Johann Christian Bauer; Paul A. Bennett; Linn Boyd Benton; Morris Benton; Lucian Bernhard; Thomas Bewick; Giambattista Bodoni; William Bowyer, II; William Bradford; Will Bradley; Will H. Bradley; David Bruce, Sr.; Henry L. Bullen; William Bulmer; William Caslon; William Caxton; T. M. Cleland; Samuel L. Clemens; Oswald B. Cooper; Laurens Janszoon Coster; Louis J.M. Daugerre; John Day; Theodore DeVinne; Jacques C. Derriey; Albrecht Durer; W.A. Dwiggins; Louis Elzevir; Henri Estienne; Robert Estienne; P. S. Fournier; Charles Francis; J.L. Frazier; John Froben; Claude Garamond; Ulrich Gering; George Phineas Gordon; Bertha M. Goudy; Fredric W. Goudy; Edmund G. Gress; The Grabhorns; Richard Grafton; Johann Gutenburg; Thomas C. Hansard; Alfred F. Harris; Sol. Hess; Richard M. Hoe; Hans Holbein; Stephen H. Horgan; Dard Hunter; Frederick Ives; Nicholas Jensen; George W. Jones; William M. Kelly; Charles Knight; Frederick Koenig; Tolbert Lanston; Aldus Manutius; Richard N. McArthur; Douglas C. McMurtrie; Ottmar Mergenthaler; R. Hunter Middleton; Stanley Morison; William Morris; Joseph Moxon; Norman T. A. Munder; John Henry Nash; Robert Wickham Nelson; John T. Nolf; Hans Peterson; Christopher Plantin; Roy T. Porte; Richard Pynson; Bernard Quaritch; Will Ransom; Will Ransom II; Erhard Ratdolt; William A. Reade; Sir Charles Reed; Theophraste Renaudot; Miller Ritchie; Bruce Rogers; Carl P. Rollins; James Ronaldson; Sterling P. Rounds; William Edwin Rudge; Rudolph Ruzicka; Peter Schoeffer; Alois Senefelder; William Spottiswoode; Edward L. Stone; Isaiah Thomas; Bradbury Thompson; Daniel Berkeley Updike; Beatrice Warde; Reynold Wolfe; Wynkyn de Worde	
Logan, Herschel C. Hand Cannon to Automatic: A Pictorial Parade of Hand Arms. Huntington, W. Va: Standard Publications, 1944. Print.	
Logan, Herschel C, and Ruth E. Adomeit. Hersh Is an Octogenarian. Santa Ana, Calif: Log-Anne Press, 1981. Print.	miniature
Logan, Herschel C, and Ruth E. Adomeit. I Saw a Ship A-Sailing. Santa Ana, Calif: Log-Anne Press, 1974. Print.	
Logan, Herschel C, and Iron E. Cody. An Indian Prayer: Known to Many of the Indian Tribes. Santa Ana, Ca. : Log-Anne Press 1976. Print.	miniature
Vest, Eugene, Herschel C. Logan (il.), Ward K. Schori, and Michael Canoso. Irish Bulls. Evanston, Ill.: Press of Ward Schori, 1981. Print.	miniature
Logan, Herschel C, and Ruth E. Adomeit. John Foster and America's First Woodcut, 1670. Fullerton [Calif.: Lorson's Books & Prints, 1988. Print. (and Fullerton [Calif.] : Lyceum Press, 1988)	miniature
Logan, Herschel C, Ruth E. Adomeit, and Elbert Hubbard. Kansas. Santa Ana, Calif. : Log-Anne Press, 1975. Print.	miniature
Logan, Herschel C, and Ruth E. Adomeit. Kätūktū = (Red Hill). Santa Ana, Calif: Log-Anne Press, 1979. Print.	miniature
Logan, Herschel C, and Ruth E. Adomeit. The Legend of a Charm. Santa Ana, Calif: Log-Anne Press, 1981. Print.	miniature
Lincoln, Abraham, and Herschel C. Logan. Lincoln Said. Santa Ana, Calif: Log-Anne Press, 1982. Print.	miniature
Logan, Herschel C, and Ruth E. Adomeit. The Little Book of Guns: A Chronology. Santa Ana, Calif: Log-Anne Press, 1978. Print.	miniature
Logan, Herschel C. Little Portraits of Famous Americans. Santa Ana, Calif: Dawson Book Shop, 1973. Print. Printed by steel die process by Anthony F. Kroll, Binding by Bela Blau, from the press of Glen and Mary Dawson family.: Jim Bridger; Admiral Byrd; Christopher Carson; George Washington Carver; William F. Cody (Buffalo Bill); George A. Custer; William H. Dempsey; Thomas A. Edison; Dwight D. Eisenhower; Stephen Collins Foster; Benjamin Franklin; John C. Fremont; General Fred Funston; Geronimo; Billy Graham; James B. Hickok; Thomas Jefferson; John Paul Jones; Robert E. Lee; Abraham Lincoln; Charles A. Lindbergh; John Marshall; John B. Omohundro; Chief Ouray; Norman Rockwell; Will Rogers; Theodore Roosevelt; Sitting Bull; Booker T. Washington; George Washington; Woodrow Wilson; Brigham Young	miniature
Logan, Herschel C, and Anne Logan. Log-anne Press. Santa Ana, Calif. : Log-Anne Press, 19800. Print.	miniature
Logan, Herschel C, and Ruth E. Adomeit. Lost & Found: A Teddy Bear. Santa Ana, Calif: Log-Anne Press, 1983. Print.	miniature
Harnsberger, Caroline T, Herschel C. Logan (il.), Richard Heath (il.). Mark Twain on Horseback. Evanston, Ill.: Schori Press, 1978. Print.	miniature
Hutton, W. R., and American Baptist Mission in Asam. Tomo Puru. Printed at the Christian Literature Society's Press, 1930.	
Logan, Herschel C, and Ruth E. Adomeit. Mountains Are for Climbing. Santa Ana, Calif: Log-Anne Press, 1984. Print.	miniature
Cline, Walter M., Herschel C. Logan (il.). The Muzzle Loading Rifle Then and Now. 1942)	
Logan, Herschel C, and Ruth E. Adomeit. My Country, 'tis of Thee: A Bi-Centennial Keepsake. Santa Ana, Calif. : Log-Anne Press, 1976. Print. online. Includes the following portraits, from ink and graphite originals.: Susan B. Anthony; Stephen Decatur; Dwight D. Eisenhower; Benjamin Franklin; Nathan Hale; Julia Ward Howe; Thomas Jefferson; Chief Joseph; John F. Kennedy; Abraham Lincoln; Dwight L. Moody; Thomas Paine; Will Rogers; Theodore Roosevelt; Samuel F. Smith; Booker T. Washington; George Washington; Daniel Webster	miniature
Troth, John T., Herschel C. Logan (il.). The Old Barn: A Poem. Evanston, Ill.: Schori Press, 1982. Print.	miniature
Logan, Herschel C, and Ruth E. Adomeit. The Old Man of Pyramid Lake. Santa Ana, Calif: Log-Anne Studio, 1973. Print.	miniature
Brooks, Phillips. One Solitary Life. Santa Ana, Calif: Log-Anne Press, 1977. Print. Contains print “Christus” by Herschel C. Logan. online	miniature
Logan, Herschel C, Everett Scrogin, and C A. Seward. Other Days in Pictures and Verse : Twelve Original Woodcuts. Kansas City, Mo: Burton Pub. Co, 1928. Print. online	
Logan, Herschel C. The Pictorial History of the Underhammer Gun. New York: Castle Books, 1960. Print.	
Eberhardt, John J, and Herschel C. Logan. The Pioneer. [Santa Ana, California] : [Log-Anne Press] 1970. Print.	miniature
Logan, Herschel C, and Ruth E. Adomeit. Pirates. Santa Ana, Calif: Log-Anne Press, 1979. Print.	miniature
Logan, Herschel C, Bela Blau, Vance Gerry, and Patrick Reagh. Portraits of Some Famous Printers. Los Angeles: Zamorano Club, 1992. Print. Posthumous commemorative edition using unpublished ink portraits originally planned for the unrealized "Great Names in Printing Through Six Centuries": Johann Gutenberg, 1400-1468; Peter Schoeffer, 1425-1502; Gunther Zainer, 1430-1478; William Caxton, 1422-1491; Erhard Ratdolt, 1442-1528; John Froben, 1460-1527; Nicholas Jensen, 1420-1480; Aldus Manutius, 1450-1515; Henri Estienne, 1470-1520; Robert Estienne, 1503-1559; Christopher Plantin, 1520-1589; Louis Elzevir, 1540-1617; Benjamin Franklin, 1707-1790; Theodore de Vinne, 1828-1914; William Morris, 1834-1896	miniature
Logan, Herschel C, O. A. Owen, Ernest Linder, Edgar Guest, George Bernard Shaw. Project '89. Los Angeles, Calif: The Chappel, 1986. Print. -- includes "THE WORLD'S MOST FAMOUS PRINTERS, 12 woodcuts by Herschel Logan reprinted by Jack Conway on 4 3/8 in x 4 6/8 in (11.11 cm x 12.07 cm) cards with text on verso, in original envelope."	
Cash, Johnny, Ruth E. Adomeit, and Herschel C. Logan (il.). Ragged Old Flag (with the story of "Old Glory"). Santa Ana, Calif: Log-Anne Press, 1980. Print.	miniature
Logan, Herschel C, and Ruth E. Adomeit. Romance of the Old West. Santa Ana, Calif: Log-Anne Press, 1978. Print.	miniature
Logan, Herschel C. Romance of the Old West Along Us 40 Thru Utah-Colorado-Kansas. Salina KS: U.S. 40 Highway Association, 1952. Print. online	
Carlson, Avis D. Small World ... Long Gone: A Family Record of an Era. Evanston, Ill: Schori Press, 1975. Print. Includes reprints of 7 Logan prints.	
Logan, Herschel C, Paul Harvey, and Ruth E. Adomeit. The Southern Cross of Honor. Santa Ana, Calif: Log-Anne Press, 1976. Print.	miniature
Logan, Herschel C, and Ruth E. Adomeit. Spanish Footprints in Kansas. Santa Ana, Calif: Log-Anne Press, 1984. Print.	miniature
Burke, Bill, Herschel C. Logan, and Ruth E. Adomeit. The Story of the Colonel as told by Bill Burke in the Salina Journal. Santa Ana, Calif: Log-Anne Press, 1975. Print. online	miniature
Petty, G H., Herschel C. Logan (il.). A Stranger Passed By. Evanston [Ill.: Schori Press, 1978. Print.	
Logan, Herschel C, Ruth E. Adomeit, and Robert H. Schuller. Symbols of Christendom. Santa Ana, Calif. : Log-Anne Press, 1975. Print.	miniature
Logan, Herschel C, and Ruth E. Adomeit. Teach Us to Pray. Fullerton, Calif.: Lorson's Books, 1987. Print.	miniature
Logan, Herschel C, and Herschel C. Logan. Texas Jack of the Old West and Mlle. Morlacchi of the Stage. Santa Ana, Calif: Log-Anne Press, 1983. Print.	miniature
Logan, Herschel C. This Ole House. Fullerton, Calif.: Lorson's Books & Prints, 1986. Print.	miniature
Logan, Herschel C, and Ruth E. Adomeit. The Thunderbird: Sacred Bearer of Happiness Unlimited. Santa Ana, Calif: Log-Anne Press, 1982. Print.	miniature
Logan, Herschel C, and Ruth E. Adomeit. To a Step-Mother. Santa Ana, Calif: Log-Anne Press, 1980. Print.	miniature
Welch, Myra B, Ruth E. Adomeit, and Herschel C. Logan. The Touch of the Master's Hand. Santa Ana, Calif. : Log-Anne Press, 1978. Print.	miniature
Logan, Herschel C. What I Know About Printing Miniature Books. Santa Ana, Calif.: Log-Anne Press, 1973. Print. - Book consists of a title page, 14 blank pages, and a final page reading: "If you know any more than this here is your chance to write a book."	miniature
Logan, Herschel C. The White Buffalo. Santa Ana, Calif. : Log-Anne Press, 1980. Print.	miniature

== Articles ==
Logan, Herschel C. "Address to Kansas House of Representative on the occasion of the Kansas Statehood Centennial." Journal of the House Twenty-Second Day. Kansas House of Representatives, Topeka, KS : February 13, 1961	online
Logan, Herschel C. "All-Metal Pistols." The American Rifleman. Washington, D.C., November, 1958, pp. 24-25	online
Logan, Herschel C. "American Hand Guns of the Gold Rush Days." The American Rifleman. Washington, D.C.: National Rifle Association, May 1954, pp. 58-59.	online
Logan, Herschel C. "American Multi-Shot Cartridge Pistols." The American Rifleman. Washington, D.C.: National Rifle Association, July 1951, pp. 30–32.	online
Logan, Herschel C. "American Single-Shot Cartridge Pistols." The American Rifleman. Washington, D.C.: National Rifle Association, June 1951, pp. 32–35, 47	online
Logan, Herschel C. "America's First Cartridge Revolver." The Gun Digest, 6th edition. Chicago, IL : The Gun Digest Company, 1951. Reprinted in "The Greatest Guns of Gun Digest" Iola, Wis.: Krause publications, 2010.	online
Logan, Herschel C. "The Arms Story in Miniature." The American Rifleman. Washington, D.C.: National Rifle Association, October, 1956, pp. 32–33 - "The article describes Logan’s own hand-made collection of eight miniature military guns. They were not working guns, but each had moving parts to illustrate the principles of operation behind each type of gun."	online
Logan, Herschel C. "Bacon Arms”. American Rifleman Magazine. Washington, D.C.: National Rifle Association, December 1957, pp. 37–39.	online
Logan, Herschel C. "Cartridge Pepperboxes: Unusual American Revolving-Barrel Handguns.” American Rifleman Magazine. Washington, D.C.: National Rifle Association, October 1959, pp. 31-32.	online
Logan, Herschel C. "The Confederate Le Mat Revolver.” American Rifleman Magazine. Washington, D.C.: National Rifle Association, November 1960, pp. 35-36.	online
Logan, Herschel C. "Courage, Bullets and Beans … a Panorama of the Civil War.” Speech, American Society of Arms Collectors, Bulletin. Number 13, Spring, 1966.	online
Peterson, Harold L., Logan, Herschel C. (il.)"The Development of Firearms (Part 1 of 4): Hand Cannon to Flintlock." American Rifleman Magazine. Washington, D.C.: National Rifle Association, March 1960, pp. 25-27.	online
Peterson, Harold L., Logan, Herschel C. (il.)"The Development of Firearms (Part 2 of 4): Percussion System and Rifling." American Rifleman Magazine. Washington, D.C.: National Rifle Association, April 1960, pp. 44-45.	online
Peterson, Harold L., Logan, Herschel C. (il.)"The Development of Firearms (Part 3 of 4): Breach-loaders and automatics." American Rifleman Magazine. Washington, D.C.: National Rifle Association, May 1960, pp. 60-63.	online
Peterson, Harold L., Logan, Herschel C. (il.)"The Development of Firearms (Part 4 of 4): Ammunition and Sources." American Rifleman Magazine. Washington, D.C.: National Rifle Association, June 1960, pp. 36-38.	online
Logan, Herschel C. "The Dewey-Berry Feud." The Branding Iron (Westerners. Los Angeles Corral), no. 2. [Los Angeles, Calif.] : [Corral of the Westerners], Dec 1971, pp. 11–13.	online
Logan, Herschel C. "E.A. Prescott (a postscript)." Arms Gazette, North Hollywood, Calif., Bienfeld Pub. Co., Dec 1974.	online
Logan, Herschel C. "E.A. Prescott and His Revolvers." American Rifleman Magazine. Washington, D.C.: National Rifle Association, September 1960, pp. 46-48.	online
Logan, Herschel C. "Fifty Years of Old Guns... a Little Visit with Major Hugh Smiley." The Texas Gun Collector. (1954), p. 8.	reference
Logan, Herschel C. "A Flintlock Blunderbuss Started It All." Shooting Times: Voice of the Gun Enthusiast. (July 1962), p. 10.	
Logan, Herschel C. "The 4-Shot Mossberg Pistols." American Rifleman Magazine. Washington, D.C.: National Rifle Association, March 1961, pp. 24-26.	online
Logan, Herschel C. "The Front Loading Plant." American Rifleman Magazine. Washington, D.C.: National Rifle Association, April 1959, pp. 21-23.	online
Logan, Herschel C. "Garters and Vest Pockets: A Review of the Small Guns Carried by Ladies and Gents of the Old West." Brand Book (Westerners. San Diego Corral), no. 2. [San Diego, Calif.] : [Corral of the Westerners], [1971].	
Logan, Herschel C. "The Gun John Brown Returned." American Rifleman Magazine. Washington, D.C.: National Rifle Association, September 1954, p. 23.	online
Logan, Herschel C. "Guns of Kansas Territorial Days." Kansas Magazine. Manhattan, Kansas: Kansas Magazine Publishing Association, 27 Oct 1954.	
Logan, Herschel C. "H.E. Dimick of St. Louis: Information on a Popular Gunmaker and Gun Dealer, Presented for the First Time." American Rifleman. April 1958. – Reprinted in The Bulletin, Missouri Historical Society, January, 1959, pp. 29–33.	online
Logan, Herschel C. "Handguns by Remington." The American Rifleman. Washington, D.C.: National Rifle Association, May 1955, pp. 50–53.	online
Logan, Herschel C. "How Rare-How Much?." 15th Annual Gun Digest, 1961. (Advertisement in "The American Rifleman", February 1961)	ad
Logan, Herschel C. "J.E. Evans of Philadelphia." Arms Gazette, North Hollywood, Calif., Bienfeld Pub. Co., June 1978.	online
Logan, Herschel C. "J. M. Marlin's Handguns." The American Rifleman. Washington, D.C.: National Rifle Association, October 1958, pp. 31–34.	online
Logan, Herschel C. "J. Stevens and his pistols." The American Rifleman. Washington, D.C.: National Rifle Association, July 1957, pp. 29–32.	online
Logan, Herschel C. "The L. W. Pond Revolvers." The American Rifleman. Washington, D.C.: National Rifle Association, January 1961, pp. 26-28.	online
Logan, Herschel C. "The Legend of Waconda Springs." The Wrangler (Westerners. San Diego Corral), v. 5, no. 1. [San Diego, Calif.] : [Corral of the Westerners], March 1972.	
Logan, Herschel C. "The Oak Underhammer Cutlass Pistol." Arms Gazette, North Hollywood, Calif., Bienfeld Pub. Co., Dec 1974.	online
Logan, Herschel C. "An Old Revolving Rifle." The American Rifleman. Washington, D.C.: National Rifle Association, June 1954, p. 36.	online
Logan, Herschel C. "Potent Persuaders: The .42 Caliber Single-Shot Cartridge derringers." The American Rifleman. February 1952, pp. 29–31, 44.	online
Logan, Herschel C. "Romance of the Old West." American Society of Arms Collectors Bulletin. 69:32-42 (1993).	online
Logan, Herschel C. "Royal Buffalo Hunt." The American Rifleman. Washington, D.C.: National Rifle Association, October 1952, pp. 37-42.	online
Logan, Herschel C. "The Schofield-Smith & Wesson."" American Rifleman Magazine. Washington, D.C.: National Rifle Association, December 1953, pp. 29-31.	online
Logan, Herschel C. "Single-Shot Underhammers." The American Rifleman. Washington, D.C.: National Rifle Association, March 1956, pp. 41-44.	online
Logan, Herschel C. "The Smith & Wesson Ladysmiths."" American Rifleman Magazine. Washington, D.C.: National Rifle Association, April 1954, pp. 47-48.	online
Logan, Herschel C. "The Story of Ignition." American Rifleman Magazine. Washington, D.C.: National Rifle Association, January 1955, pp. 21-25.	online
Logan, Herschel C. "The Story of Our ASAC Emblem." American Society of Arms Collectors Bulletin. Fall 1969, No. 20, pp. 26-27.	online
Logan, Herschel C. "What is your Gun Worth?" American Rifleman Magazine. Washington, D.C.: National Rifle Association, August 1960, pp. 43-44.	online
Logan, Herschel C. "Woodcut Technique." The Federal Illustrator. Minneapolis, Minn. : Federal Schools, Spring 1931.	online
