= Newmains =

Coordinates: 55.783°N 3.879°W

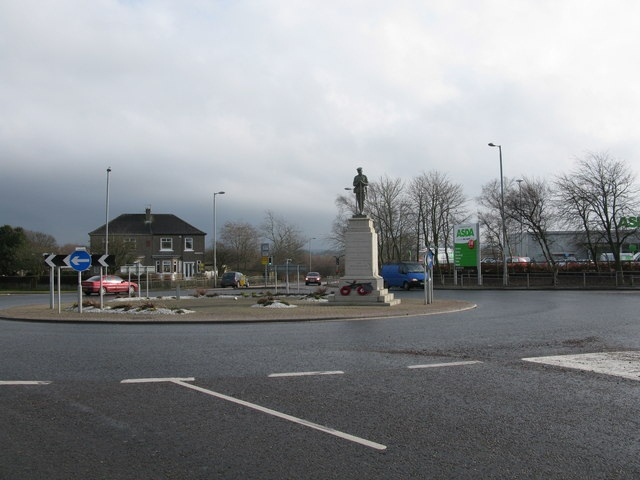
- The main roundabout in Newmains, showing the Town War Memorial and the Asda Superstore.

- Location within North Lanarkshire
- Population: 5,430 (2020)
- OS grid reference: NS820558
- Council area: North Lanarkshire
- Lieutenancy area: Lanarkshire
- Country: Scotland
- Sovereign state: United Kingdom
- Post town: WISHAW
- Postcode district: ML2
- Dialling code: 01698
- Police: Scotland
- Fire: Scottish
- Ambulance: Scottish
- UK Parliament: Airdrie and Shotts
- Scottish Parliament: Motherwell and Wishaw

Newmains is a village and former mining community on the eastern edge of Wishaw, North Lanarkshire, Scotland, 18 miles (29 km) south-east of Glasgow.

== History ==
The story of all the villages in the area surrounding Newmains and Wishaw is essentially the story of one of the most successful ventures into heavy industry in Scotland. Three iron works, the Omoa Ironworks, the Coltness Iron Company and the Shotts Iron Company comprise the earliest and perhaps the most important concentration of iron and steel manufacture in Scotland.

The Coltness Iron Works was established in 1837 by industrialist, Henry Houldsworth who, foreseeing the gradual demise of the once booming cotton industry, decided to diversify into minerals. On a visit to the Shotts Iron Company in 1836, Henry Houldsworth heard a rumour that the nearby Coltness Estate was to be sold. He lost no time in commissioning a survey which showed a large mineral field on the property. The estate was soon purchased from the trustees of Sir James Steuart Denham enabling the fortuitous establishment of an iron works on a proven mineral field. As well as the 'blackband' ironstone, there were considerable coal seams to be explored which would provide the fuel necessary to feed the furnaces.

Transport problems were solved in 1841 with a rail link to Coatbridge and the business prospered, expanding into Ayrshire with the opening of the Dalmellington Iron Works and sinking several new coal-pits in the area. One reason for its success was the self-contained nature of the company operations, providing its own coal and its own limestone from quarries on the estate. The company also entered the brick-making business both to provide bricks for its own needs and also for sale to a wider market. In 1909, they expanded into Portland Cement manufacture.

The Coltness works survived until the 21st century as a railway sleeper manufacturing facility for Tarmac, but were demolished in 2004.

== Amenities ==
The main shopping areas, Manse Road and Main Street, has some shops but not as many as nearby Wishaw or Motherwell. It is now home to only a few local merchants.

=== Services ===
Newmains has a public library and Newmains Health Centre with pharmacy, doctors and children's dentistry. Newmains has also seen the opening of a community centre "NCT centre" which is now home to the library, meeting rooms, cafe, large function hall and home to groups such as a youth club and a toddler group

== Transport ==
=== Public transport ===
Buses are the only form of public transport in Newmains. Services by First Glasgow (266, X11) and Stuart's Buses (365, 367), provide bus routes to Wishaw, Shotts, Motherwell, Hamilton, Glasgow.

=== Roads ===
The town is located on the junction of the A71 and the A73, which provide road links to most parts of Scotland. The M8 motorway with access to Glasgow and Edinburgh is 4.5 miles (7.2 km) north of the village. And the M74 motorway with access to Glasgow and Carlisle is 7 miles (11 km) west. There is also a short road, the A722, between Newmains and central Wishaw.

=== Rail ===
The Coltness branch from the West Coast Main Line at Garriongill terminates near the village, but is used only for the transport of coal from the nearby open cast mining facility.

== Education ==
=== Primary schools ===
Newmains is served by three (two) primary schools:

- Newmains Primary and Nursery
- Morningside Primary
- Newmains & St Brigid's Community Hub (Newmains Primary and Nursery + St Brigid's Primary)

== Football ==
Newmains has a football club, Newmains Hammers which accommodates various boys club age groups and has two amateur clubs founded in the Summer of 2017 (One Saturday morning team and one Sunday team). Newmains United Community Football Club play in the Central Division Two of the Scottish Junior Football Association. Formed in 2006 their home ground is at Victoria Park, Overtown Road, Newmains. It has a capacity of 2,300. History tells about several teams playing in Newmains, such as: Newmains Thistle, Newmains Shamrock, Newmains Rovers, Newmains, Newmains Victoria, Newmains Juniors. With Newmains Thistle becoming the first ever Junior League champions in 1891–92.

== Notable people ==
- Dr David Dale Logan FRSE DSO OBE (1879-1956), gas warfare expert, served as GP to Newmains from 1903
- Andrew Wilson - Scottish international footballer, who made over 250 appearances for Chelsea and managed Walsall.
- Dr I Allan Brownlie - chemist who simplified the process and cost of fertiliser production, which was patented in 28 countries.
- Lewis Macleod - Footballer for Rangers and Brentford.
- Tom Sharp - Former footballer for Brentford.
- Freddie Glidden - footballer (Heart of Midlothian).
- James Bryson (J.B.) McLachlan - Scottish-Canadian trade unionist and communist politician, was a resident of Newmains between 1873 and 1902.
