= Michael Logan =

Michael or Mike Logan may refer to:

- Michael Logan (journalist), American magazine columnist
- Michael Logan (bassist) (born 1948), American jazz bassist
- Mike Logan (American football) (born 1974), player for the Pittsburgh Steelers
- Mike Logan (Law & Order), fictional character from the television series Law & Order and Law & Order: Criminal Intent

== See also ==
- Logan (surname)
