= Chapel of the Chimes (Hayward, California) =

Cemetery in Hayward, California

Coordinates: 37°36′44″N 122°1′25″W

Chapel of the Chimes Memorial Park and Funeral Home is a 61-acre (25 ha) cemetery, mausoleum, crematorium, columbarium and funeral home complex in Hayward, California. The site was first established as a seven-acre cemetery in 1872. One of the memorial park's three mausoleums is circular in design, the only such one in California. The park hosts one of the larger Memorial Day services in the San Francisco Bay Area. A replica of the Angel of Grief statue is located there. The former Masonic Cemetery and Decoto Cemetery are now encompassed within its bounds. The park's owners, NorthStar Memorial Group, also operate the Chapel of the Chimes columbarium in Oakland, California, Skylawn Memorial Park in San Mateo, and Sunset Lawn Chapel of the Chimes in Sacramento.

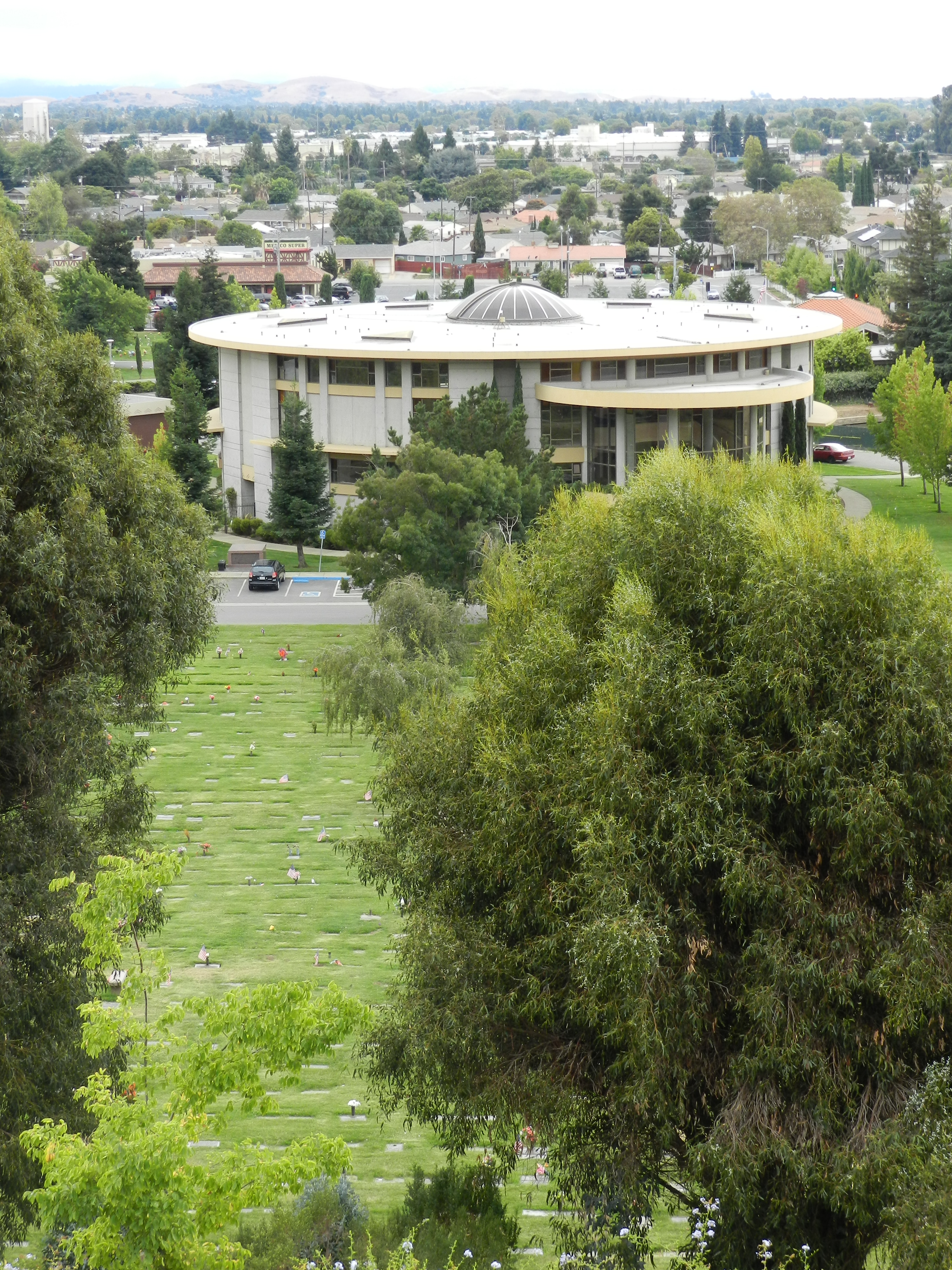
Circle of Peace mausoleum, from hillside cemetery site

== Notable interments ==
- Spade Cooley, convicted murderer, western swing musician, big band leader, actor, and television personality
- Thomas Fitch, United States Representative from Nevada
- James Logan, local education official, namesake of James Logan High School
- Daniel Sakai, slain Oakland Police officer
- James Cleveland Whipple, local education official, colleague of James Logan, namesake of Whipple Road in nearby Union City
