= William Logan (footballer) =

Scottish footballer

Personal information
- Full name: William G. Logan
- Place of birth: Scotland
- Positions: Outside left; right back

Senior career*
Years	Team	Apps	(Gls)
1906–1909	Queen's Park	2	(1)
1909–1911	St Bernard's	30	(8)
1911–1912	Queen's Park	6	(0)
- * Club domestic league appearances and goals

William G. Logan was a Scottish amateur footballer who played as an outside left and right back in the Scottish League for St Bernard's and Queen's Park.

== Personal life ==
Logan served as a gunner in the Royal Field Artillery during the First World War.

== Career statistics ==
Appearances and goals by club, season and competition
Club	Season	League			Scottish Cup		Other		Total	
Club	Season	Division	Apps	Goals	Apps	Goals	Apps	Goals	Apps	Goals
Queen's Park	1907–08	Scottish First Division	2	1	0	0	0	0	2	1
St Bernard's	1909–10	Scottish Second Division	20	7	6	4	—		26	11
St Bernard's	1910–11	Scottish Second Division	10	1	6	0	—		16	1
St Bernard's	Total		30	8	12	4	—		42	12
Queen's Park	1911–12	Scottish First Division	6	0	0	0	1 (Note: Appearance in Glasgow Cup)	0	7	0
Career total			38	9	12	0	1	0	51	9
