= Bruce Logan =

Bruce Logan may refer to:

- Bruce Logan (author) (born 1938), New Zealand author and activist
- Bruce Logan (filmmaker) (1946–2025), British-born American filmmaker
- Bruce Logan (rower) (1886–1965), British Olympic rower
- Bruce Logan (skateboarder) (born 1951), American skateboarder
- Bruce E. Logan, American civil and environmental engineer
