= Sadye L. Logan =

Sadye L. Logan is a social work academic who is the I. DeQuincey Newman Distinguished Professor Emeritus of Social Work at the University of South Carolina.

== Early life and education ==
Logan earned her MSW at the Hunter College School of Social Work and her DSW in 1980 from the Columbia University School of Social Work.

== Career ==
She founded the Isiah DeQuincey Newman Institute for Peace and Social Justice at the School of Social Work at the University of South Carolina and directed it from 2001 until 2013.

Logan is on the corporate board of Affalia, a social work journal for woman and an associate editor for the online version of the NASW Encyclopedia.

== Honors and awards ==
Logan is a member of the Columbia University School of Social Work Hall of Fame and was named a NASW Pioneer.
