= Jennifer Logan =

Atmospheric scientist

Jennifer Ann Logan
- Other name: Jennifer Ann Makowski (1972-75)
- Scientific career
- Thesis: A molecular beam study of methyl radical reactions with halogens : product angular and velocity distributions (1975)
- Doctoral advisor: John Ross (chemist)

Jennifer Logan is an atmospheric scientist known for her research on how human activities influence the atmosphere, particularly with respect to biomass burning and the ozone hole.

== Education and career ==
Logan has a B.Sc. in chemistry from the University of Edinburgh, Scotland (1971) and a Ph.D. in physical chemistry from the Massachusetts Institute of Technology (1975). She subsequently worked as a research fellow at Harvard University, was a Fellow at the Environmental Protection Agency in Washington DC, and then return to Harvard in 1979 where she remained until her retirement in 2013.

== Research ==
An overarching theme of Logan's research is how anthropogenic activities influence the composition of the atmosphere. Broadly, her research includes investigations into how fires impact particles in the atmosphere, how changes in climate impact air quality, the use of satellite data to measure ozone, and modeling efforts that link current and past atmospherical datasets.

After her Ph.D. research on halogens, Logan considered how people influence atmospheric chemistry through actions including biomass burning, agriculture, and the release of chlorocarbons. She extended this research to identify spatial and temporal variability in ozone levels in the troposphere and directly linked the loss of atmospheric ozone with the presence of halogens, chlorine, and bromine. She also examined long-term, global, trends in ozone levels starting with data from 1970s through to the early 1990s. Her research identified how sulfur-based atmospheric pollutants can form SO_{2} and she presented a global view of inorganic compounds in the troposphere.

Logan's research links atmospheric conditions with climate change on earth. Her research details how the distribution of ozone in the atmosphere changes global surface temperatures and how vegetation in rural areas is exposed to ozone that is produced from anthropogenic emissions of NO_{x} compounds.

Forest fires introduce chemical compounds into the atmosphere and Logan's research in this arena has examined the global impact of the fires in Alaska and Canada and California. She quantified the amount of chemical compounds produce during biomass burning in the developing world and how photochemical changes in particles produced from biomass burning impact ozone concentrations in the troposphere.

Logan's participation in large-scale modeling efforts include research on a global model of atmospheric chemistry that examines interactions between NO_{x} compounds and hydrocarbons, models of optical thickness of aerosols, causes of long-term trends in atmospheric ozone, and modeling of carbon monoxide produced during biomass burning.

In 2001, Logan contributed to the section of Intergovernmental Panel on Climate Change (IPCC) report that covers "Atmospheric Chemistry and Greenhouse Gases".

=== Selected publications ===
- Logan, Jennifer A. (1983). "Nitrogen oxides in the troposphere: Global and regional budgets". Journal of Geophysical Research: Oceans. 88 (C15): 10785–10807. Bibcode:1983JGR....8810785L. doi:10.1029/JC088iC15p10785. ISSN 2156-2202.
- Logan, Jennifer A.; Prather, Michael J.; Wofsy, Steven C.; McElroy, Michael B. (1981). "Tropospheric chemistry: A global perspective". Journal of Geophysical Research: Oceans. 86 (C8): 7210–7254. Bibcode:1981JGR....86.7210L. doi:10.1029/JC086iC08p07210. ISSN 2156-2202.
- McElroy, Michael B.; Salawitch, Ross J.; Wofsy, Steven C.; Logan, Jennifer A. (1986). "Reductions of Antarctic ozone due to synergistic interactions of chlorine and bromine". Nature. 321 (6072): 759–762. Bibcode:1986Natur.321..759M. doi:10.1038/321759a0. ISSN 1476-4687. S2CID 4277544.

== Awards and honors ==
- Fellow, American Association for the Advancement of Science (1997)
- Fellow, American Geophysical Union (2001)
