= Stephen Logan =

Stephen Logan may refer to:

- Stephen Logan (The Bold and the Beautiful), a character on The Bold and the Beautiful
- Stephen T. Logan (1800–1880), American lawyer and politician
