= Arthur Logan =

Arthur Logan may refer to:

- Arthur J. Logan, United States Army general
- Arthur C. Logan (c. 1905–1973), American surgeon
