= Paddy Logan =

Paddy Logan may refer to:

- Paddy Logan (footballer) (1877–1957), Scottish footballer
- Paddy Logan (politician) (1845–1925), British member of parliament
