= Robert Logan =

Robert Logan may refer to:

== Politics ==
- Robert Logan (politician) (1863–1935), New Zealand runholder, local politician, military leader and administrator
- Robert Hart Logan (1772–1838), Canadian-born British politician
- Robert Henry Logan (1839–1900), American soldier and politician

== Film ==
- Bob Logan (film director), American film director and writer
- Robert Logan Jr. (1941–2024), American actor

== Sports ==
- Bob Logan (ice hockey) (born 1964), ice hockey player
- Bob Logan (baseball) (1910–1978), American baseball pitcher

== Other ==
- Robert Logan (bishop) (1784–1830), Irish Roman Catholic bishop
- Robert K. Logan (born 1939), Canadian academic and writer
- Robert Logan Sr. (1837–1919), New Zealand boat builder
- Robert Logan of Restalrig (c. 1555–1606), Scottish conspirator
- Robert Logan (naval architect) (1861–1918), Scottish naval architect
