= Jim Logan (Australian footballer) =

Australian rules footballer

Personal information
- Full name: James Henry Benjamin Logan
- Born: 12 April 1911
- Died: 25 January 1999 (aged 87)
- Original team: Box Hill
- Height: 166 cm (5 ft 5 in)
- Weight: 68 kg (150 lb)

Playing career^{1}
Years	Club	Games (Goals)
1942	Hawthorn	1 (0)
- ^{1} Playing statistics correct to the end of 1942.

James Henry Benjamin Logan (12 April 1911 – 25 January 1999) was an Australian rules footballer who played with Hawthorn in the Victorian Football League (VFL).

== Family ==
The eighth of ten children born to George Henry Logan (1869–1938) and Emma Harriet Logan (1877–1946), née Fisher, James Henry Benjamin Logan was born in Clifton Hill, Victoria on 12 April 1911.

His older brother, Albert Clarence Hill "Dick" Logan was also a VFL footballer with Hawthorn.

== Football ==
=== Hawthorn (VFL) ===
Originally from Surrey Hills, Jim Logan was granted a permit to play for Hawthorn during the 1942 VFL season. Logan played a single VFL game, lining up in the forward pocket in Hawthorn's loss to Melbourne on 30 May 1942. The next week he was listed as injured and although he remained on the training list through until 1943 he never managed another senior game.

== Military service ==
Aged 33, Logan enlisted to serve in the RAAF in early 1945, and served for 13 months.
