= Thomas Logan (disambiguation) =

Thomas or Tom Logan may refer to:

- Thomas Logan, a character of Marvel Comics
- Tom Logan (footballer) (born 1985), Australian rules footballer
- Tom Logan (water polo) (1927–2011), New Zealand water polo player
- Tom Logan (director) (born 1953), film and TV director
- Tom Logan, a character in the Scary Movie films
- Thomas M. Logan (1840–1914), Confederate general
- Tommy Logan (1888–1960), Scottish footballer (Falkirk FC, Chelsea FC and Scotland)

== See also ==
- Logan Tom (born 1981), American volleyballer
