= Scott Logan =

Scott Logan may refer to:

- Scott Logan (rugby league) (born 1976), Australian rugby league player
- Scott Logan (swimmer) (born 1976), Australian swimmer
