= Max Logan =

Australian rules footballer

Personal information
- Full name: Max Logan
- Born: 20 March 1934
- Died: 21 February 2006 (aged 71)
- Original team: New Town
- Height: 182 cm (6 ft 0 in)
- Weight: 78 kg (172 lb)

Playing career^{1}
| Years | Club | Games (Goals) |
| 1954–55 | South Melbourne | 13 (3) |
- ^{1} Playing statistics correct to the end of 1955.

Max Logan (20 March 1934 – 21 February 2006) was an Australian rules footballer who played with South Melbourne in the Victorian Football League (VFL).
