= Dave Logan (writer) =

American author and professor (born 1968)

- Born: 1968 (age 56–57)
- Occupations: Author; Management consultant; University professor
- Spouse: Harte Logan
- Website: www.davelogan.com

David C. Logan (born 1968) is an American author and professor. He is best known for his book Tribal Leadership (co-authored with John King and Halee Fischer-Wright), which was a New York Times Bestseller.

== Career ==
Logan gained a Ph.D. in Organizational Communication from the Annenberg School at University of Southern California (USC). He has been on faculty in the USC's Marshall School of Business since 1996 and he was associate dean of executive education (2000–2004). Logan is also on the faculty at Getty Leadership Institute, the American College of Physician Executives, and teaches in the International Center for Leadership in Finance (ICLIF) in Kuala Lumpur. In 1997, he co-founded CultureSync, a management consulting firm.

Logan has co-authored four books, including Tribal Leadership and Three Laws of Performance. He is a contributing writer at CBS Money Watch, and the editor of seven eJournals at the Social Science Research Network. He also lectures on leadership and organizational culture. He has been interviewed on CNN, Fox, National Public Radio and most major US networks and he has written for CNN the Huffington Post and The Gallup Business Journal. Logan's TED Talk on tribal leadership has over a half of million views.

== Reception ==
Twice profiled by Forbes Magazine (2011), it described Logan as "an internationally admired USC management professor, a paradigm shifter" (2013). Toastmasters Magazine noted, "Dave Logan is one of the most natural and accomplished speakers you are likely to find." CBS News profiled Tribal Leadership in 2008. Logan's book is widely cited by financial texts.

== Bibliography ==
- Tribal Leadership: Leveraging Natural Groups to Build a Thriving Organization by Dave Logan, John King and Halee Fischer-Wright
- The Three Laws of Performance: Rewriting the Future of Your Organization and Your Life by Steve Zaffron and Dave Logan
