= Josh Logan =

Josh Logan may refer to:

- Joshua Logan (1908–1988), American director, writer, and actor
- Josh Logan (country singer), American singer
- Josh Logan (rock singer) (born 1980), American singer-songwriter
