= Charles Logan =

Charles Logan may refer to:

- Charles Logan (author) (born 1930), British science fiction writer
- Charles Logan (24), fictional character on the U.S. television series 24
- Chuck Logan (American football) (born 1943), former American football tight end
