= Andrew Logan (surgeon) =

British cardio-thoracic surgeon

Andrew Logan FRCSE FRCS
- Andrew Logan
- Born: 6 November 1906
- Died: 9 September 2005 (aged 98); Edinburgh, Scotland
- Education: University of St Andrews
- Occupation: Cardio-thoracic surgeon
- Known for: Mitral valve dilator First UK lung transplant
- Medical career
- Institutions: Royal Infirmary of Edinburgh

Andrew Logan, FRCS, FRCSEd (6 November 1906 – 9 September 2005) was a British cardiothoracic surgeon. For most of his career he worked in Edinburgh where he established the specialty of cardio-thoracic surgery. He devised a mitral valve dilator to treat mitral stenosis and this technique, modified by Oswald Tubbs and by Russell Brock, became widely used to treat this condition. He assisted at the first pneumonectomy in the UK and performed the first lung transplant in the UK.

== Early life ==
He was born in Strathaven, Scotland, son of Andrew and Euphemia Logan. When he was four the family moved to Dairsie Mains Farm, Dairsie, Fife, Scotland. At the age of sixteen he left school and matriculated at the University of St Andrews for an arts degree, studying philosophy, Latin and French. He graduated Master of Arts (MA) in 1926 and then enrolled in medicine qualifying MB ChB in 1929.

== Career ==
In 1932 he became a Fellow of the Royal College of Surgeons of Edinburgh and decided to train in thoracic surgery, a surgical speciality which was then in its infancy. He worked in Newcastle under Professor George Grey-Turner who had pioneered thoracic surgical procedures including blunt oesophagectomy. In 1934 Logan assisted his colleague George Mason at the first pneumonectomy in Britain on a 15-year-old patient with bronchiectasis. This involved detaching the lung but leaving it in the thoracic cavity. Logan later described how he was left to remove the necrotic lung as planned on the 10th post-operative day. During World War II he served in the Royal Army Medical Corps ending with the rank of lieutenant-colonel. He served in Egypt and in Palestine where he was surgeon in charge of a thoracic surgical unit. At the start of the National Health Service in 1948, he was asked to set up a thoracic surgical unit in Edinburgh, initially at the Eastern General Hospital moving to the Edinburgh City Hospital in 1952. This unit became the regional thoracic surgical unit for south east Scotland, initially dealing mainly with pulmonary tuberculosis, lung cancer and oesophageal cancer. As cardiac surgery was developed he established a cardiac surgery unit at the Royal Infirmary of Edinburgh. Logan devised an operation for mitral stenosis for which he gained an international reputation. He designed a mitral valve dilator, introduced through the left ventricle and achieved impressive results with this technique. The instrument was modified by Oswald Tubbs, who added a screw, and by Russell Brock and the procedure became widely used until the advent of open heart surgery. In 1968 he performed the first lung transplant in the UK (the fifth in the world) on a patient whose lungs had been damaged by paraquat poisoning.

== Honours ==
He became president of the Society for Cardiothoracic Surgery and president of the Scottish Thoracic Society. The American Thoracic Society made him an honorary fellow. In 1960, he was elected a member of the Harveian Society of Edinburgh. The University of St Andrews awarded the degree of DSc in 1972.

== Family ==
He married Mary Josephine Littlewood during WW2. They had two daughters, and a son who became a surgeon.

== Later life and death ==
After retiring in 1972 he joined his former trainee Ben LeRoux in Durban, South Africa, where he continued to operate and teach for a further ten years. He died in Edinburgh on 9 September 2005.
