= Prairie Print Makers =

American Printmaking Society

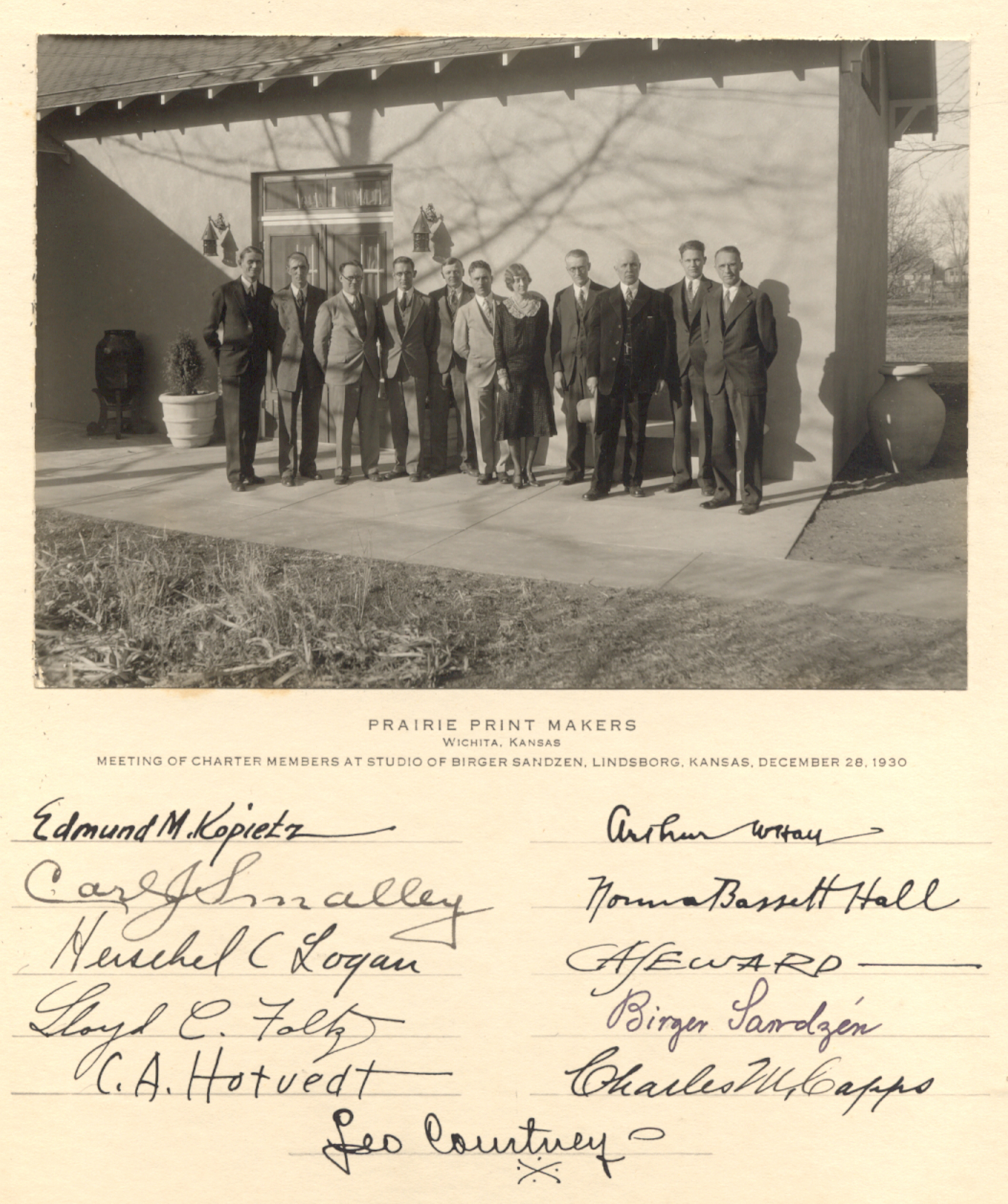
Charter members of the Prairie Print Makers

The Prairie Print Makers was a society of print artists and collectors headquartered in Wichita, Kansas and active from 1930 to 1966. Formed by a group of Kansas artists, its objective was "to further the interest of both artists and laymen in printmaking and collecting". Membership was by invitation only and consisted of active artists who paid only $1 per year, and associates who paid $5 per year. A third category of free honorary membership was conferred by the governing board to those who contributed to the cause of print making and collecting.

Two principal activities were employed to achieve the society's goals. First, an artist member was commissioned each year to produce a print, typically limited to an edition of 200, solely for distribution to the associate membership. Second, the society sponsored annual sales exhibitions of new works by society artists. These were sent to schools, social clubs, museums, art clubs, universities, and libraries. A collection of available prints went to the east and south, the west (including Hawaii), and the mid-west, with a fourth set held in reserve to meet demand. The prints from these shows were purposely priced low, from 3 to 15 dollars, "so that the public may enjoy the opportunity to purchase these excellent specimens of American art for personal use or gifts".

The Prairie Print Makers group was modeled on The Chicago Society of Etchers, the Society of American Etchers, and Print Makers of California. It was meant to complement and augment such older societies whose memberships were full and who focused only on intaglio prints. Like its California counterpart, the Prairie Print Makers embraced not just etchings, but lithographs, wood engravings, woodcuts, and linoleum cuts as well.

Though membership expanded well outside the original mid-west origins, much of the art produced for the society is in the regionalist tradition, featuring serene scenes of small towns, farms and rural landscapes of the mid-west. Presentation prints were to be produced "in the realist tradition of observable life" and must "reflect the tradition and art of printmaking itself".

== History ==
After a year of planning, the Prairie Print Makers society formally began on December 28, 1930. Eight artists traveled to Lindsborg, Kansas at the invitation of C. A. Seward to meet with him in the studio of Birger Sandzen to mark the occasion. The charter members were Leo Courtney (president), Charles Capps (vice-president), C. A. Seward (secretary-treasurer), Lloyd Foltz, Clarence Hotvedt, Arthur W. Hall, Norma Bassett Hall, Herschel Logan, Edmund Kopietz, and Birger Sandzén. They were joined by Carl Smalley, an art and book dealer, and close friend of Seward and Sandzén. Artist William Dickerson from Wichita was the first artist nominated to join the fledgling organization. Carl Smalley was awarded the first honorary membership.

The annual report for 1935-36 shows considerable growth in the first four years -- over 100 associate members, 47 artists from twenty-two states, and exhibitions of 90 prints held at thirty-one venues. Both membership and the society's reputation continued to grow, eventually including over 100 artist members, including prominent names like John Taylor Arms, John Steuart Curry, Clare Leighton, Stow Wengenroth, Luigi Lucioni, Frances Gearhart, and Gene Kloss.

By the 1960s, the society was struggling to maintain its initial spirit. There was greater interest in more progressive art, and most founding artists were dead or no longer active. Art from all across the country had become more accessible to the public not only through such societies, but through art fairs, museums and galleries. The last presentation print was produced and the last exhibitions circulated in 1965. The final decision to disband the society came with the retirement of James Swann, secretary-treasurer for 19 years. What remained in the treasury was used to finance an annual C. A. Seward Memorial Purchase Prize for the Wichita Art Association. The final communication to members was dated July 27, 1966.

== Presentation prints ==
Year	Artist	Print title	Type
1931	Birger Sandzen	A Kansas Creek	lithograph
1932	Arthur William Hall	Stone Bridge in Winter	drypoint
1933	Levon West	The Prairie Rider	etching
1934	Ernest Watson	Woodbine	linocut
1935	Lloyd C. Foltz	Ozark Valley	etching
1936	C. A. Seward	Adobe Village--New Mexico	lithograph
1937	William-Auerbach Levy	Job	etching
1938	Charles Capps	Mexican Barber Shop	aquatint
1939	Alfred Hutty	Loblolly Pines	drypoint
1940	Stow Wengenroth	New England Village, Castine, Maine	lithograph
1941	Doel Reed	Spring	aquatint
1942	William J. Dickerson	Church at Canyoncito	lithograph
1943	Norma Bassett Hall	La Gaude--France	color woodcut
1944	Cyrus LeRoy Baldridge	Soo Chow Canal	drypoint
1945	Gene Kloss	Southwestern Summer	etching and drypoint
1946	Grant Reynard	The Pianist	etching
1947	Gordon H. Grant	Heave and Haul	etching
1948	James D. Havens	Cinnamon Fern and Verry	color woodblock
1949	Leslie Cope	Going Home	drypoint
1950	Elizabeth Saltonstall	Gloxinias	lithograph
1951	Ted Hawkins	Sleepy Afternoon	etching and aquatint
1952	Clare Leighton	Corn Pulling	wood engraving
1953	James Swann	Willow	drypoint
1954	Agnes Tait	Old Friends	lithograph
1955	Luigi Lucioni	Themes in White	etching
1956	Margaret Ann Gaug	Ballerina	etching and aquatint
1957	Stow Wengenroth	The Far Shore, Ogunquit, Maine	lithograph
1958	Walter J. Phillips	Waterfall, Lake of the Woods	wood engraving
1959	Robert von Neumann	Fishing Off the Maine Coast	lithograph
1960	Maurice Bebb	Breasted Nuthatch	color etching
1961	Leo Meissner	Tidal Surge	wood engraving
1962	Lloyd C. Foltz	Ghost Town	lithograph
1964	Arthur William Hall	Lake Biwa	drypoint
1965	Charles Capps	Idyl of New Mexico	etching and aquatint

== Sources ==
- North, Bill, Elizabeth Seaton, and Karal Ann Marling. David Conrads and Pamela Evans, editors. The Prairie Print Makers: An Exhibition. Kansas City, Missouri : ExhibitsUSA, Mid-America Arts Alliance, 2001. Print.
- Czestochowski, Joseph S, and James Swann. James Swann: In Quest of a Printmaker : with Presentation Prints of the Chicago Society of Etchers, Prairie Print Makers, and the Woodcut Society. Cedar Rapids, Iowa: Cedar Rapids Museum of Art, 1990. Print. (Includes images of all presentation prints)
- Hotvedt, Steve. "Chapter 15: The Prairie Print Makers 1930-1966" C.A. Hotvedt, Prairie Print Maker, October, 2020
- Kansas Historical Society. Kansapedia : Prairie Print Makers Prints
- North, Cori S. In the Center of It All : 90 Years of the Prairie Print Makers. Lindsborg, Kansas : The Birger Sandzén Memorial Foundation, 2020.
- O'Neill, Barbara T, George C. Foreman, and Howard W. Ellington. The Prairie Print Makers. Wichita, Kansas: 1984. Print.
- Wichita State University, University Libraries, Special Collections & University Archives. C. A. Seward and Prairie Print Makers Collection
