= Cornelius Logan =

Cornelius Logan may refer to:

- Cornelius Ambrosius Logan (1806–1853), American playwright and actor
- Cornelius Ambrose Logan (1832–1899), son of Cornelius Ambrosius, American physician and diplomat
- Cornelius Logan, a fictional character in the Molly Moon novels
