= James C. Logan =

American fraternity leader (1914–1997)

James C. Logan (January 5, 1914 – February 29, 1997) was a prominent Kansas City area attorney and a national president and expansion leader of Tau Kappa Epsilon fraternity.

== Early life and education ==
James C. Logan born January 5, 1914, to Mr. and Mrs. James Montgomery Logan. He earned his A.B. degree in psychology from Baker University in 1933, where he was a member of the Zeta Chi fraternity. Zeta Chi is the oldest independent fraternity west of the Mississippi River. At Baker, Logan was also Junior class president and a varsity debater. In 1936, Logan graduated from Washington University in St. Louis with a LL. B. degree. While he was a student at Washington University, he was initiated into the Xi chapter of Tau Kappa Epsilon. Logan earned a Ph.D. degree from the University of Kansas.

== Fraternity leadership ==
After graduating from Washington University, Logan returned to Kansas City where he remained actively involved with Tau Kappa Epsilon in regional affairs. He served in the position of Kansas-Nebraska Province Hegemon, and between 1939-1941 he played a key role establishing the Eta Colony of TKE at the University of Kansas and the Chi Beta Colony of TKE at the University of Missouri.

From 1945-47, Logan served his first term on the Grand Council of Tau Kappa Epsilon, as Grand Pylortes. In 1951, the position of Grand Hegemon was created, and Logan was elected to fill the new position. He was elected the 19th Grand Prytanis (national president) at the 27th Conclave in 1953 in Des Moines, Iowa. Logan was re-elected Grand Prytanis at the 28th Conclave, which was held at the Hotel President and Municipal Auditorium in Kansas City, Missouri. During his two terms in office, 44 new chapters were installed, and a national housing fund was established to provide loans to undergraduate chapters for the construction and purchase of fraternity houses. Logan also wrote the first fraternity textbook on chapter rushing entitled "Rushing Tips."

James C. Logan was awarded the Order of the Golden Eagle Award in 1993. The Order of the Golden Eagle is the highest award given to a member of Tau Kappa Epsilon for service to the fraternity.

== Professional career ==
James C. Logan was a prominent attorney in the Kansas City metro area. He was a partner at Watson, Ess, Marshall & Enggas in Kansas City, Missouri. He co-authored volumes 1, 1A, and 2 of Missouri Practice Methods, and an authored a number of leading law articles published in The Missouri Law Review, The Controller, and the Kansas City Bar Bulletin. In June 1955, Logan was honored by the Thomas Hart Benton chapter of Phi Alpha Delta national law fraternity for his service to the Kansas City legal community.

A man of strong political views, Logan was elected president of the Jackson County Young GOP Federation in 1938, and he was elected vice president of the Missouri Federation of Young Republic Clubs in 1939. Logan was also a licensed pilot and airplane owner. He was a member of the faculty of the American Aeronautical Institute in Kansas City, where he taught ground curriculum for the CPT program. He was also president of the American Flying Club.
