= David Dale Logan =

Scottish physician, soldier and medical author

David Dale Logan DSO OBE FRSE (20 August 1879 – 16 November 1956) was a distinguished Scottish physician, soldier and medical author. He was an expert on gas warfare, and, as an odd attachment to a medical training, was an expert mining engineer.

== Biography ==
He was born in Arbroath on the north-east Scottish coast on 20 August 1879. He was educated at Arbroath High School. He studied medicine at Glasgow University graduating MB ChB in 1900. He then set up as a General Practitioner (GP) in Newmains in Lanarkshire. He received his doctorate in 1906 and a Diploma in Public Health in 1910.

In the First World War he served with distinction in the Royal Army Medical Corps, rising to the rank of lieutenant colonel. He was official Gas Warfare advisor to the British 2nd Army from 1915 and Engineer-in-Chief at GHQ from 1917. He won the DSO and was Mentioned in Dispatches.

In the Second World War he acted as a military advisor, and also served in the Home Guard, and was a appointed an Officer of the Order of the British Empire in the military division in 1944, in recognition of meritorious service in the Home Guard. In 1945 he was elected a Fellow of the Royal Society of Edinburgh. His proposers were Sir John Fraser, Sir Andrew Davidson, Sir Sydney Smith, and John M. Johnston.

He died on 16 November 1956 in Glasgow Royal Infirmary aged 77.

== Publications ==
- Gas Poisoning in Mining and Other Industries (1914) co-written with Dr John Glaister (1856-1932)
- Detonation of High Explosive in Shell and Bomb and Its Effects (1939)

== Family ==
He was married to Janet Galloway Russell (d.1955), daughter of Hugh Scott Russell, in Cambusnethan in 1917, whilst on leave from the army.
