= Paul Logan =

Paul Logan may refer to:

- Paul Logan (colonel), US army colonel and inventor of the emergency chocolate ration
- Paul Logan (actor) (born 1973), American actor

== See also ==
- Logan Paul (born 1995), American YouTube personality, actor, and professional wrestler
