= George Logan (soccer) =

American soccer coach

George Logan (c. 1933 – April 19, 2009) was a collegiate soccer head coach. From 1968 to 1981, he served as the first head men's soccer coach at San Diego State University, where he compiled a 148-48-17(.735) record. His winning percentage ranks 16th all-time among NCAA Division 1 coaches. In 14 seasons, he never had a losing season.

He was also a very successful high school soccer coach. He coached at Valhalla High School near San Diego, where he compiled a 298-74-37 record in 16 seasons. The team reached the San Diego Section championship game eight times, winning it five times. Between 1987 and 1990, Valhalla went on a 53-match unbeaten streak. Valhalla won 10 league titles and made the playoffs 15 times.

He died April 19, 2009, at age 76.
