= Mark Logan =

Mark Logan may refer to:

- Mark Logan (politician) (born 1984), former British Member of Parliament (2019-2024)
- Mark Logan (cricketer) (born 1960), South African cricketer
- One of the pseudonyms of Christopher Nicole (1930–2017), British writer
- Mark Logan (American football), player in 1988 Cincinnati Bengals season
- Mark Logan, co-writer of Superman vs. Spider-Man XXX
