= Dick Logan (Australian footballer) =

Australian rules footballer

Personal information
- Full name: Albert Clarence Hill Logan
- Born: 29 June 1906; Carlton, Victoria
- Died: 1 September 1996 (aged 90); Oakleigh, Victoria
- Original team: Box Hill
- Height: 165 cm (5 ft 5 in)
- Weight: 59 kg (130 lb)

Playing career^{1}
Years	Club	Games (Goals)
1926–1930	Hawthorn	58 (35)
- ^{1} Playing statistics correct to the end of 1930.

Albert Clarence Hill "Dick" Logan (29 June 1906 – 1 September 1996) was an Australian rules footballer who played with Hawthorn in the Victorian Football League (VFL).

== Early life ==
The son of George Henry Logan (1869–1938) and Emma Harriett Logan, nee Fisher (1877–1946), Albert Clarence Hill Logan was born at Carlton on 29 June 1906.

His younger brother, Jim Logan was also a VFL footballer with Hawthorn.

== Football ==
Logan joined Hawthorn from Box Hill early in the 1926 VFL season. After being named best on ground in the reserves in his first week at the club he made his debut against Richmond in Round 4 and again played well. Despite being one of the shortest and lightest players to ever play senior football, Logan played in the majority of games over the next five years, mostly playing as a half-forward or on the wing, scoring 35 goals and picking up a solitary Brownlow Medal vote in 1929.

Logan continued to play for Hawthorn's reserve team until the end of the 1932 season and in 1932 he won the Gardiner Medal for the best and fairest player in the seconds competition, despite playing only ten games for the season.

== Later life ==
After his football career Logan worked as a boilermaker. In 1935 he married Lillian Elizabeth Joyner and they lived in the eastern suburbs of Melbourne until her death in 1957.

Logan subsequently married Nancy Mary Sanders and they lived in the Oakleigh area until his death in September 1996. He was cremated at the Springvale Botanical Cemetery.
