= James Logan (trustee) =

Irish-American education official (1864–1931)

James Logan (1864–1931) was an education official in Centerville, California, which is today a district of Fremont, California. The James Logan High School built in Union City in 1959 is named after him.

== Biographical information ==
Logan was born in Maghera, County Londonderry, Ireland in 1864. In 1891, he immigrated to the Alvarado area of Alameda County, California, where he farmed and owned orchard land. In 1894, he married neighbor Rebecca Jane Kerr, daughter of William Kerr and Jane Fyffe of Castlederg, County Tyrone, Ireland. They had 12 children - Andrew K. Logan (b. 1894), Annie Logan (b. 1895), John M. Logan (b. 1897), Jennie Ross Logan (b. 1899), William Fyffe Logan (b. 1901), Matilda (Tilly) Gilmore (b. 1904), May Rebecca (b. 1906), Alma F. Logan (b. 1908), Clarabelle Logan (b. 1911), James Logan (b. 1913), Theodore Logan (b. 1914) and Ralph Gordon Logan (b. 1910). Three of the daughters became teachers.
Logan was active in the International Order of Odd Fellows, Crusade Lodge #93 in Alvarado, the Masonic Lodge in Centerville and the Alvarado Presbyterian Church.

== Education involvement ==
Logan was elected to the board of trustees for Washington Union High School in 1931. He used his farming equipment to condition the sports field at the new school. On October 16, 1931, he and fellow Trustee, James Cleveland Whipple, were killed in an auto accident in Hayward. Both were interred at Chapel of the Chimes cemetery in Hayward. Logan's son Andrew was appointed school trustee in his father's place. Memorial Grove was placed on the new Washington High School campus on February 22, 1932, to commemorate the bicentennial of George Washington’s birth, and trees were planted in memory of Logan, former principal George Wright and former trustee John Whipple. The school newspaper, The Hatchet, reported in 1935 that, "this spot is held sacred because of the loyalty and devotion of the men it honored."
