= Richard Logan (footballer, born 1988) =

English footballer

Personal information
- Full name: Richard Adam Logan
- Date of birth: 18 February 1988 (age 38)
- Place of birth: Washington, Tyne and Wear, England
- Height: 6 ft 0 in (1.83 m)
- Position: Forward

Youth career
- Darlington

Senior career*
Years	Team	Apps	(Gls)
2005–2007	Darlington	1	(0)
2005	→ Workington (loan)	4	(0)
2006	→ Gateshead (loan)	0	(0)
2007	Virginia Beach Mariners		
2007	Ostevalls		
2007	Blyth Spartans		
2009–2010	Consett		
2010–2011	Sunderland RCA	27	(11)
2011–	Shildon		
- * Club domestic league appearances and goals

Richard Adam Logan (born 18 February 1988) is an English professional football forward who played in the Football League for Darlington. His brother is England goalkeeper Jordan Pickford.

== Career ==
He began his career as a trainee with Darlington. He made his league debut as a 16-year-old substitute on 5 March 2005, as a second-half substitute for Keith Gilroy in a 1–0 win at home to Bury.

In need of the first-team experience, he was allowed to join Workington on loan in September 2005. Still on the outside of Darlington's first team squad, he joined Gateshead on loan in September 2006.

He was released by Darlington in January 2007. He then went on to sign for the Virginia Beach Mariners, managed by former Northern Ireland international Colin Clarke. He subsequently moved to Sweden to play for Ostevalls before signing for Conference North side Blyth Spartans on 5 October 2007.

In 2009, he was playing for Consett. From Consett he moved on to Sunderland RCA where he had a good season, he went on to play for Shildon for the 2011–12 season. During pre-season for Shildon, he suffered a cruciate ligament injury ruling him out until the 2013 season.
