= Harry Logan =

Scottish footballer (1888–1910)

Personal information
- Full name: Henry Morrison Logan
- Date of birth: May 1888
- Place of birth: Glasgow, Scotland
- Date of death: After 1910
- Height: 5 ft 7 in (1.70 m)
- Position: Inside forward

Senior career*
Years	Team	Apps	(Gls)
1905–1906	Cathcart Windsor		
1906–1907	Myrtle XI		
1907–1908	Glasgow Benburb		
1908–1909	Shettleston		
1909–1910	Sunderland	1	(0)
1910–1911	Woolwich Arsenal	11	(0)
- * Club domestic league appearances and goals

Henry Morrison Logan (May 1888 – after 1910) was a Scottish professional footballer who played as an inside forward for Sunderland.
