= F. Donald Logan =

American historian (1930–2022)

Francis Donald Logan FSA FRHistS (March 9, 1930 – February 22, 2022) was an American historian who was Professor of History at Emmanuel College.

== Biography ==
Francis Donald Logan was born in Boston on March 9, 1930, the son of Joseph (a milk deliverer) and Laura (MacDonald). Educated at St. John's Seminary, the University of Toronto and the Pontifical Institute of Mediaeval Studies, Logan has served as professor emeritus of History of Emmanuel College since 1993. He was the author of several notable works on the Vikings and religious history. Logan was a Fulbright Scholar, a Guggenheim Fellow, and a fellow of the Pontifical Institute of Mediaeval Studies, the Royal Historical Society and the Society of Antiquaries of London.

He died at his house on February 22, 2022.

== Selected bibliography ==
- Excommunication and the Secular Arm in Medieval England: A Study in Legal Procedure from the Thirteenth to the Sixteenth Century, 1968
- The Vikings in History, 1983
- A History of the Church in the Middle Ages, 2002
- The Medieval Court of Arches, 2005
- Runaway Religious in Medieval England, c. 1240–1540, 1996
