= Andy Logan =

American football player (1918–1998)

Profile
- Positions: Tackle, center

Personal information
- Born: February 17, 1918; Jefferson County, Ohio, U.S.
- Died: November 21, 1998 (aged 80); Lima, Ohio, U.S.
- Listed height: 6 ft 0 in (1.83 m)
- Listed weight: 230 lb (104 kg)

Career information
- High school: Connorville (OH)

Career history
- Detroit Lions (1941)

Career statistics
- Games: 9
- Stats at Pro Football Reference

Andrew Wyhowanec Logan (February 17, 1918 – November 21, 1998) was an American football player.

Logan was born in Connorville, Ohio, in 1918. He attended high school in Connorville and then enrolled at the Western Reserve University. He played college football as a tackle for the Western Reserve Red Cats football team from 1938 to 1940 under head coach Bill Edwards. As a senior, he scored 40 points and was the leading scorer of the 1940 Western Reserve Red Cats football team that compiled an 8–1, including a victory over Arizona State in the 1941 Sun Bowl.

After the 1940 season, Western Reserve head coach Edwards was hired as head coach of the Detroit Lions of the National Football League (NFL). Logan followed Edwards with the Lions, signing with the club in August 1941. Logan appeared in nine games for the Lions during the 1941 season. He began the season at the tackle position and was then converted into a center.

In April 1942, Edwards announced that Logan had joined the Army Air Corps as an air cadet. He played for the Wright Patterson Field Pylons football team in the fall of 1942.

After World War II, Logna worked for Ex-Cell-O Tool and Manufacturing Co., retiring in 1986. He died in 1998 in Lima, Ohio, at age 80.
