= Wilcox (surname) =

Wilcox is a surname. Notable people with the surname include:

- Adam Wilcox (disambiguation), multiple people
- Albert Spencer Wilcox (1844–1919), businessman and politician in the Kingdom of Hawaii
- Alex Wilcox, airline executive and entrepreneur
- Alfred Wilcox (1884–1954), English recipient of the Victoria Cross
- Alonzo Wilcox (1810–1878), American politician
- Barry Wilcox (cyclist) (born 1978), American para-cyclist
- Benjamin M. Wilcox (1854–1912), New York politician
- Brad Wilcox (disambiguation), multiple people
- Bryce "Zooko" Wilcox-O'Hearn, American cryptoengineer
- Cadmus M. Wilcox (1824–1890), U.S. Army officer and Confederate general in the American Civil War
- Carlos Wilcox (1794–1827), American poet
- Cathy Wilcox (born 1963), Australian illustrator and cartoonist
- Charles Wilcox (disambiguation), multiple people
- Chris Wilcox (born 1982), American basketball player
- Chris Wilcox (American football) (born 1997), American football player
- C. J. Wilcox (born 1990), American basketball player
- Cole Wilcox (born 1999), American baseball player
- Collin Wilcox (actress) (1937–2009), American actress
- Collin Wilcox (writer) (1924–1996), American writer
- Daniel Wilcox (born 1977), American football player
- David Wilcox (disambiguation), multiple people
- Denys Wilcox (1910–1953), English cricketer and schoolteacher
- Desmond Wilcox (1931–2000), British TV documentary maker
- Donald Wilcox (1969–2003), American spree killer
- Eddie Wilcox (1907–1968), American jazz pianist and arranger
- Edgar Wilcox (1830–1917), American politician and farmer
- Edward Wilcox (disambiguation), multiple people
- Ella Wheeler Wilcox (1850–1919), American author and poet
- Floyd Wilcox (1886–1958), American academic administrator
- Frank Wilcox (1907–1974), American character actor
- Frank N. Wilcox (1887–1964), American painter
- Fred Wilcox (disambiguation), multiple people
- Freya Wilcox, Australian-born singer, songwriter
- George Wilcox (disambiguation), multiple people
- Harvey Henderson Wilcox (1832–1891), American real estate developer
- Herbert Wilcox (1890–1977), British film producer
- Howdy Wilcox (Howard Samuel Wilcox) (1889–1923), American racecar driver
- J. J. Wilcox (James Edward Wilcox Jr.) (born 1991), American football safety
- J. Mark Wilcox (James Mark Wilcox) (1890–1956), U.S. Representative from Florida
- Jack Wilcox (John Mitchell Wilcox) (1886–1940), English footballer
- Jamarion Wilcox, American football player
- James Wilcox (actor), American actor; see The Peacock Fan
- James Wilcox (novelist) (born 1949), American novelist and professor
- James A. Wilcox (born 1952), American economist and professor
- James D. Wilcox, American film editor and director
- Jason Wilcox (born 1971), English football player
- Jeremy Wilcox (born 1979), Canadian volleyball player
- Jessica Arline Wilcox, better known as Candy Jones (1925–1990), American model
- John Wilcox (disambiguation), multiple people
- Jon P. Wilcox (born 1936), American judge
- Judith Wilcox, Baroness Wilcox (born 1940), British noblewoman and politician
- Justin Wilcox (disambiguation), multiple people
- Kathi Wilcox (born 1969), American musician
- Keith W. Wilcox (1921–2011), general authority of The Church of Jesus Christ of Latter-day Saints
- Larry Wilcox (born 1947), American actor
- Lisa Wilcox (born 1964), American actress
- Mary Rose Wilcox, American politician
- Mat Wilcox, Canadian businesswoman
- Milt Wilcox (born 1950), American baseball player
- Mitchell Wilcox (born 1996), American football player
- Murray Wilcox, The Hon. Justice, AO, QC (1937–2018), Australian Federal Court Justice (retired)
- Paula Wilcox (born 1949), British actress
- Pete Wilcox (born 1961), British Anglican bishop
- Randall Wilcox (1793–1872), pioneer settler of De Pere, Wisconsin
- Rebecca Wilcox (born 1980), British television presenter
- Reed N. Wilcox, American academic
- Richie Wilcox (born 1980), Canadian contestant on the television show Canadian Idol
- Robert Wilcox (disambiguation), multiple people
- Roy Wilcox (disambiguation), multiple people
- Russ Wilcox (born 1964), English professional footballer and manager
- Sadie Jean Wilcox (born 2002), American singer-songwriter
- Sheila Willcox (1936–2017), British equestrian
- Simon Wilcox (born 1976), Canadian musician, daughter of David Wilcox
- Sophie Wilcox (born 1975), English actress
- Stephen Wilcox (1830–1893), American inventor of the water tube steam boiler
- Terry Fugate-Wilcox (born 1944), American sculptor
- Thomas Wilcox (1549–1608), British Puritan clergyman, controversialist, and co-author of Admonition to Parliament, 1571 (the "Puritan Manifesto")
- Thomas Wilcox (1622–1687), British Puritan clergyman, and author
- Vernon Wilcox (1918–2004), Australian politician
- Walter Wilcox (1869–1949), Canadian mountaineer, explorer of the Canadian Rockies
- William Wilcox (disambiguation), multiple people

== Fictional characters ==
- Julia Wilcox, character from the American television series Frasier
- Several members of the Wilcox family in the novel Howards End.

== See also ==
- Wilcock
- Wilcox (disambiguation)
- Willcock
- Willcocks
- Willcox (disambiguation)
- Willcox (surname)
- Willock
- Wilcoxon
