= 1908–09 Birmingham F.C. season =

Birmingham F.C.
1908–09 season
- Chairman: Walter W. Hart
- Secretary-manager: Alex Watson
- Ground: St Andrew's
- Football League Second Division: 11th
- FA Cup: First round (eliminated by Portsmouth)
- Top goalscorer: League: Billy Beer (8); All: Billy Beer, Frederick Chapple (8)
- Highest home attendance: 30,035 vs West Bromwich Albion, 28 December 1908
- Lowest home attendance: 1,500 vs Chesterfield Town 17 April 1909
Team colours

The 1908–09 Football League season was Birmingham Football Club's 17th in the Football League and their 9th in the Second Division, to which they were relegated at the end of the 1907–08 season. They began the season well, not dropping out of the top two until December, but gradually fell away until finishing in 11th position in the 20-team division. They also took part in the 1909–10 FA Cup, entering at the first round proper and losing in that round to Portsmouth.

Alex Watson succeeded Alf Jones as secretary-manager at the start of the season. Jones began acting as unpaid secretary for Small Heath Alliance in 1885, the year the club turned professional, became their first paid secretary with responsibility for team matters in 1892, when the club first joined the Football League, and had held the post of secretary-manager ever since.

Twenty-nine players made at least one appearance in nationally organised first-team competition, and there were fifteen different goalscorers. Goalkeeper Jack Dorrington played in 35 of the 39 matches over the season; full-back Billy Beer played one fewer. Beer and Frederick Chapple were joint leading scorers with 8 goals; all of Beer's goals were scored in the league. In September, a 19-year-old called Frank Womack made his Football League debut. He went on to play 515 times for Birmingham in senior competition, 491 in the league, but never scored a goal.

In October, Walter Corbett, who had made his debut for the England senior team earlier in the year, was a member of the gold medal-winning Great Britain Olympic football team at the London Olympics.

== Football League Second Division ==
Note that not all clubs finished their playing season on the same date. Birmingham were in 10th place in the division after their final game, on 24 April, but by the time the fixtures were all complete, on 30 April, they had been overtaken by Gainsborough Trinity and finished 11th.

Date	League position	Opponents	Venue	Result	Score F–A	Scorers	Attendance
2 September 1908	1st	Bolton Wanderers	H	W	2–0	Eyre 2	8,000
5 September 1908	2nd	Gainsborough Trinity	A	W	3–1	Eyre 2, W.H. Jones	5,000
7 September 1908	1st	Bradford Park Avenue	H	W	3–1	Smith, Fairman, W.H. Jones	10,000
12 September 1908	1st	Grimsby Town	H	W	3–1	Jones, Green pen, Smith	15,000
19 September 1908	1st	Fulham	A	D	1–1	Green	38,000
26 September 1908	1st	Burnley	H	W	2–0	Fairman, W.H. Jones	20,000
6 October 1908	1st	Bradford Park Avenue	A	W	2–1	Beer, Baddeley og	8,000
10 October 1908	1st	Wolverhampton Wanderers	H	D	1–1	Smith	20,000
17 October 1908	1st	Oldham Athletic	A	L	0–2		14,000
24 October 1908	1st	Clapton Orient	H	W	1–0	Williams	10,000
31 October 1908	1st	Leeds City	A	L	0–2		15,000
7 November 1908	2nd	Barnsley	H	W	2–1	Green, W.H. Jones	10,000
14 November 1908	2nd	Tottenham Hotspur	A	L	0–4		20,000
21 November 1908	2nd	Hull City	H	L	1–2	Beer	5,000
28 November 1908	2nd	Derby County	A	W	2–1	Moore, Mounteney	10,000
5 December 1908	3rd	Blackpool	H	D	2–2	Chapple, Smith	7,000
12 December 1908	5th	Chesterfield Town	A	L	2–4	Mounteney, Anderson	5,000
19 December 1908	6th	Glossop	H	L	1–2	Smith	5,000
25 December 1908	4th	Stockport County	H	W	4–2	Chapple 4	10,000
26 December 1908	5th	West Bromwich Albion	A	D	1–1	King	38,049
28 December 1908	5th	West Bromwich Albion	H	D	0–0		30,035
1 January 1909	5th	Bolton Wanderers	A	L	1–2	Beer	23,000
2 January 1909	5th	Gainsborough Trinity	H	D	2–2	King, Beer	10,000
9 January 1909	5th	Grimsby Town	A	W	3–0	Williams, Chapple	5,000
23 January 1909	5th	Fulham	H	L	1–3	Beer	9,000
30 January 1909	5th	Burnley	A	D	1–1	Beer	7,000
13 February 1909	6th	Wolverhampton Wanderers	A	L	0–2		10,000
20 February 1909	5th	Oldham Athletic	H	W	2–0	Beer 2	12,000
27 February 1909	6th	Clapton Orient	A	L	2–3	King, Bumphrey	7,000
13 March 1909	8th	Barnsley	A	L	1–3	King	4,000
20 March 1909	7th	Tottenham Hotspur	H	D	3–3	King, Mounteney, Daykin	8,000
27 March 1909	7th	Hull City	A	L	1–4	Bumphrey	8,000
3 April 1909	8th	Derby County	H	D	1–1	King	4,000
9 April 1909	8th	Stockport County	A	L	2–3	Chapple, Lowe	7,000
10 April 1909	10th	Blackpool	A	L	0–2		3,000
12 April 1909	9th	Leeds City	H	W	1–0	Bumphrey	3,000
17 April 1909	8th	Chesterfield Town	H	W	3–0	Mounteney 3	1,500
24 April 1909	10th	Glossop	A	L	1–2	Mounteney	500

=== League table (part) ===
Final Second Division table (part)
Pos	Club	Pld	W	D	L	F	A	GA	Pts
9th	Gainsborough Trinity	38	15	8	15	49	70	0.70	38
10th	Fulham	38	13	11	14	58	48	1.21	37
11th	Birmingham	38	14	9	15	58	61	0.95	37
12th	Leeds City	38	14	7	17	43	53	0.81	35
13th	Grimsby Town	38	14	7	17	41	54	0.76	35
Key	Pos = League position; Pld = Matches played; W = Matches won; D = Matches drawn; L = Matches lost; F = Goals for; A = Goals against; GA = Goal average; Pts = Points								
Source									

== FA Cup ==
Round	Date	Opponents	Venue	Result	Score F–A	Scorers	Attendance
First round	16 January 1909	Portsmouth	H	L	2–5	Chapple pen, King	18,813

== Appearances and goals ==
This table includes appearances and goals in nationally organised competitive matches – the Football League and FA Cup – only.
For a description of the playing positions, see Formation (association football)#2–3–5 (Pyramid).
Players marked † left the club during the playing season.

Players' appearances and goals by competition
Name	Position	League		FA Cup		Total	
Name	Position	Apps	Goals	Apps	Goals	Apps	Goals
Arthur Box	Goalkeeper	4	0	0	0	4	0
Jack Dorrington	Goalkeeper	34	0	1	0	35	0
Walter Corbett	Full back	15	0	1	0	16	0
John Kearns †	Full back	27	0	1	0	28	0
Frank Stokes	Full back	23	0	0	0	23	0
Frank Womack	Full back	14	0	0	0	14	0
Billy Beer	Half back	33	8	1	0	34	8
Thomas Daykin	Half back	17	1	1	0	18	1
Bob Fairman	Half back	19	2	0	0	19	2
Albert Gardner	Half back	2	0	0	0	2	0
Tom Handley	Half back	12	0	0	0	12	0
Walter Wigmore	Half back	23	0	1	0	24	0
George Anderson	Forward	12	1	1	0	13	1
James Bumphrey	Forward	12	3	0	0	12	3
Frederick Chapple	Forward	19	7	1	1	20	8
Edmund Eyre †	Forward	15	4	0	0	15	4
Benny Green	Forward	18	3	0	0	18	3
Wilf Haines	Forward	3	0	0	0	3	0
Billy Jones	Forward	18	5	1	0	19	5
Charles Jones	Forward	1	0	0	0	1	0
Frederick Kerns	Forward	1	0	0	0	1	0
Harry King	Forward	19	6	1	1	20	7
Bernard Lowe	Forward	11	1	0	0	11	1
George Moore	Forward	2	1	0	0	2	1
Arthur Mounteney	Forward	16	7	0	0	16	7
Billy Smith	Forward	17	5	0	0	17	5
George Travers	Forward	1	0	0	0	1	0
Jack Wilcox	Forward	18	0	1	0	19	0
James Williams †	Forward	12	3	0	0	12	3

== See also ==
- Birmingham City F.C. seasons
