= Willcock =

Willcock and similar can mean:

- Alex Willcock (born 1964), British designer and entrepreneur
- Amy Willcock, American cookery book writer
- Christopher Willcock (born 1947), Australian Jesuit priest
- Edith Gertrude Willcock (1879–1953), English nuclear physicist and biochemist
- Eric Willcock (born 1947), English cricketer
- Harry Willcock (1896–1952), British Liberal Party activist
- Ian Willcock (born 1959), British composer and academic
- John Willcock (1879–1956), Australian politician
- Kevin Willcock (born 1973), English cricketer
- Malcolm Willcock (1925–2006), British classical scholar

== See also ==
- Wilcock
- Wilcox (disambiguation)
- Wilcox (surname)
- Willcocks
- Willcox (disambiguation)
- Willcox (surname)
- Willock
- Wilcoxon
