= Wilcock =

Wilcock is a Norman surname. It may refer to the following:

- C. C. Wilcock (born 1946), American taxonomist
- Clifford Wilcock (1898–1962), British engineer, company director and politician
- David Wilcock (1973–2026), American paranormal writer
- Dennis Wilcock, second singer for the band Iron Maiden
- George Wilcock (1890–1962), English footballer
- Gordon Wilcock (born 1950), English cricketer
- J. Rodolfo Wilcock (1919–1978), Argentinian author, poet, critic and translator
- John Wilcock (1927–2018), British journalist
- Justin Wilcock (born 1979), American diver
- Ken Wilcock (1934–2025), British sprinter
- Peter Wilcock (born 1945), English professional golfer

== See also ==
- Wilcox (disambiguation)
- Wilcox (surname)
- Willcock
- Willcocks
- Willcox (disambiguation)
- Willcox (surname)
- Willock
- Wilcoxon
