= List of Birmingham City F.C. managers =

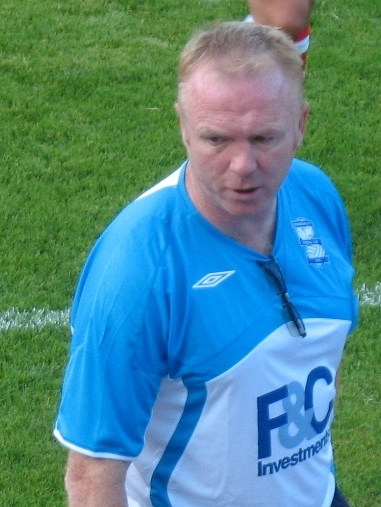
Alex McLeish led Birmingham to victory in the 2010–11 League Cup.

Birmingham City Football Club, an English professional football club based in the city of Birmingham, was founded in 1875. When league football began, the first team – then playing under the name Small Heath – competed in the Football Alliance before being elected to the newly formed Second Division of the Football League in 1892. At that point, club secretary Alf Jones – its first paid official – assumed some of what are now seen as managerial responsibilities.

There have been 44 full-time managers: (Note: The count of full-time managers includes the early secretary-managers, but excludes those whose tenure covered only wartime competition.) the most recent appointee, Chris Davies, joined in June 2024. Bob McRoberts was appointed in 1911 as Birmingham's first manager whose role did not include secretarial duties. George Liddell has had the longest tenure, of six years and two months (267 matches) in the 1930s, while Trevor Francis has managed the team for most matches: 290 over five years and five months between 1996 and 2001. All three formerly played for the club. Under Arthur Turner, Birmingham won the 1954–55 Second Division title, followed up with what remains the team's highest league finish, sixth place in the 1955–56 First Division, and reached the 1956 FA Cup Final. Gil Merrick in 1963 and Alex McLeish in 2011 oversaw League Cup wins and Barry Fry led his team to a "double" of third-tier title and Football League Trophy in 1994–95.

All managers who have taken charge of at least one competitive match are listed below. Each manager's entry includes his dates of tenure and the club's overall competitive record (in terms of matches won, drawn and lost), honours won and significant achievements while under his care. Caretaker managers are also included, where known, as well as those who have been in permanent charge.

== History ==
In the early days, team management was undertaken by a club committee. When payment of players was legalised in 1885, Alf Jones began to act as club secretary on a voluntary basis. Small Heath's election to the newly formed Second Division of the Football League in 1892 prompted the board of directors to appoint him as the club's first paid official, responsible as secretary-manager for matters on the field in addition to his administrative duties. In his first season the club won the inaugural Second Division championship, and gained promotion to the First Division for the first time the following year via the Test Match system. Jones's 16-year tenure saw three promotions and three relegations, after the last of which in 1908 he resigned. The second of Alex Watson's three seasons in charge ended with the club having to apply for re-election to the league, and in 1911, responsibility for team affairs passed to former player Bob McRoberts, who became the club's first dedicated team manager. (Note: Matthews' books have McRoberts taking over as team manager from secretary-manager from Watson in 1910; contemporary sources show that the change was made in 1911.)

Frank Richards succeeded Watson as club secretary in 1911, and when the First World War broke out he took over the managerial reins as well. Under Richards Birmingham won the Second Division title in 1921 and signed players such as Joe Bradford, Johnny Crosbie and Dan Tremelling who did much to keep the club in the top flight through the 1920s. He also forgot to enter them in the 1922 FA Cup. Billy Beer and Bill Harvey kept them in the First Division, albeit in the lower half of the table, before former Arsenal manager Leslie Knighton took charge in 1928. He led them to their first FA Cup final in 1931 and a top-half league finish the following year, but left when Chelsea made him an offer Birmingham were unable to match. Former Birmingham defender George Liddell kept them in the top tier until they were relegated in the last season completed before the Second World War, resigning in September 1939 when league football was suspended. His tenure of just over six years made him the club's longest-serving team manager.

Harry Storer, appointed just before the war ended, won the championship of the 1945–46 Football League South wartime league and the Second Division title two years later. Under Bob Brocklebank Birmingham were relegated from the First Division, but they reached the semifinal of the 1951 FA Cup and Brocklebank signed many of the players moulded by Arthur Turner into a successful team. Turner won promotion in 1955, the next season led the team to their highest league finish of sixth place and their second FA Cup final, and in 1957 reached the semifinals of both the FA Cup and the inaugural Inter-Cities Fairs Cup competition. In 1958 the club's experimental joint appointment, which gave new arrival Pat Beasley dual authority over playing matters while reducing Turner's responsibility for administrative matters, prompted Turner's resignation after seven months. Beasley himself quit when the club decided on a further restructure. (Note: On 4 February 1958, Beasley was appointed joint manager alongside Turner, so the 8–0 defeat to Preston North End on 1 February was the responsibility of Turner alone. Turner resigned on 4 September with immediate effect, leaving Beasley as acting manager and accountable for the last six September matches. He became permanent manager in January 1959, and resigned on 23 May 1960.) He and successor Gil Merrick took the team to successive finals of the Fairs Cup in 1960 and 1961. Merrick managed them to their first major trophy, beating local rivals Aston Villa 3–1 on aggregate in the 1963 League Cup Final, but after four years of fighting relegation, the board asked for his resignation.

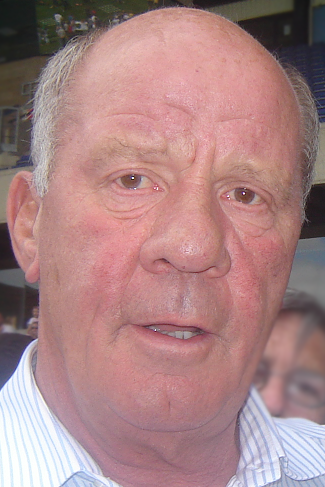
Jim Smith managed Birmingham between 1978 and 1982.

Joe Mallett presided over relegation before acting as assistant to Stan Cullis, who laid the foundations for the team's future success before retiring from football in 1970. Chosen only after abortive approaches were made to Don Revie, Brian Clough and Ronnie Allen, Freddie Goodwin converted the attractive but inconsistent football of Cullis's teams to a skilful, aggressive game capable of winning promotion and maintaining top-flight status. The British-record sale of goalscorer Bob Latchford to Everton was partially mitigated by the arrival of Howard Kendall and emergence of Trevor Francis, but the team struggled. Goodwin survived a vote of confidence in April 1975, but was sacked in September after his reaction to a training-ground incident provoked Kenny Burns into a transfer request. First-team coach Willie Bell, initially appointed as acting manager, achieved little in two years, and was replaced by club director Sir Alf Ramsey, whose brief managerial tenure ended with him leaving the club entirely. (Note: Ramsey's biographer has him "locked in an increasingly bitter three-way dispute with his star player, Trevor Francis, and the board". After initially accepting the player's transfer request, the board changed their minds, fearful they would "incur the wrath of already disgruntled fans". Ramsey duly handed in his notice. The Times reported that "Sir Alf said he told the board two weeks ago that he intended to quit and sever his links with the club. ... He said at a board meeting on February 20 he recommended both Francis and the defender, Joe Gallagher, should be transfer listed. The board agreed but three days later changed their minds about Francis. Sir Alf said he then decided to opt out because of the board's policy.") Jim Smith brought experienced players to the club but was sacked to make way for Ron Saunders, who had just walked out on league champions and local rivals Aston Villa. (Note: Saunders was announced as Birmingham manager on Thursday 18 February 1982, having walked out on local rivals Aston Villa some two weeks earlier. As the Birmingham derby was scheduled for the Saturday, he took over formally as manager after the derby on Monday 22 February. "Mr Saunders said that the final formalities were in the hands of solicitors and accountants and, subject to completion of the details, he would be taking over on Monday, Norman Bodell, acting as manager since Jim Smith was suddenly dismissed on Monday, will be in charge of the side for the local derby.")

Financial difficulties and instability at board level led to six managerial changes in seven years. Saunders resigned after FA Cup defeat to non-league Altrincham, John Bond seemed out of touch, and in April 1989, once relegation to the Third Division for the first time in the club's history was confirmed, the club's new owners replaced Garry Pendrey with Dave Mackay. Within 18 months, with relegation to the Fourth Division a possibility, Mackay resigned. Lou Macari came in, revitalised the side, won the Football League Trophy at Wembley, and three weeks later walked out to join Stoke City. Terry Cooper won promotion back to the second tier and kept the team going during four months of administration before he quit, fearing new owner David Sullivan would want to bring in his own man.

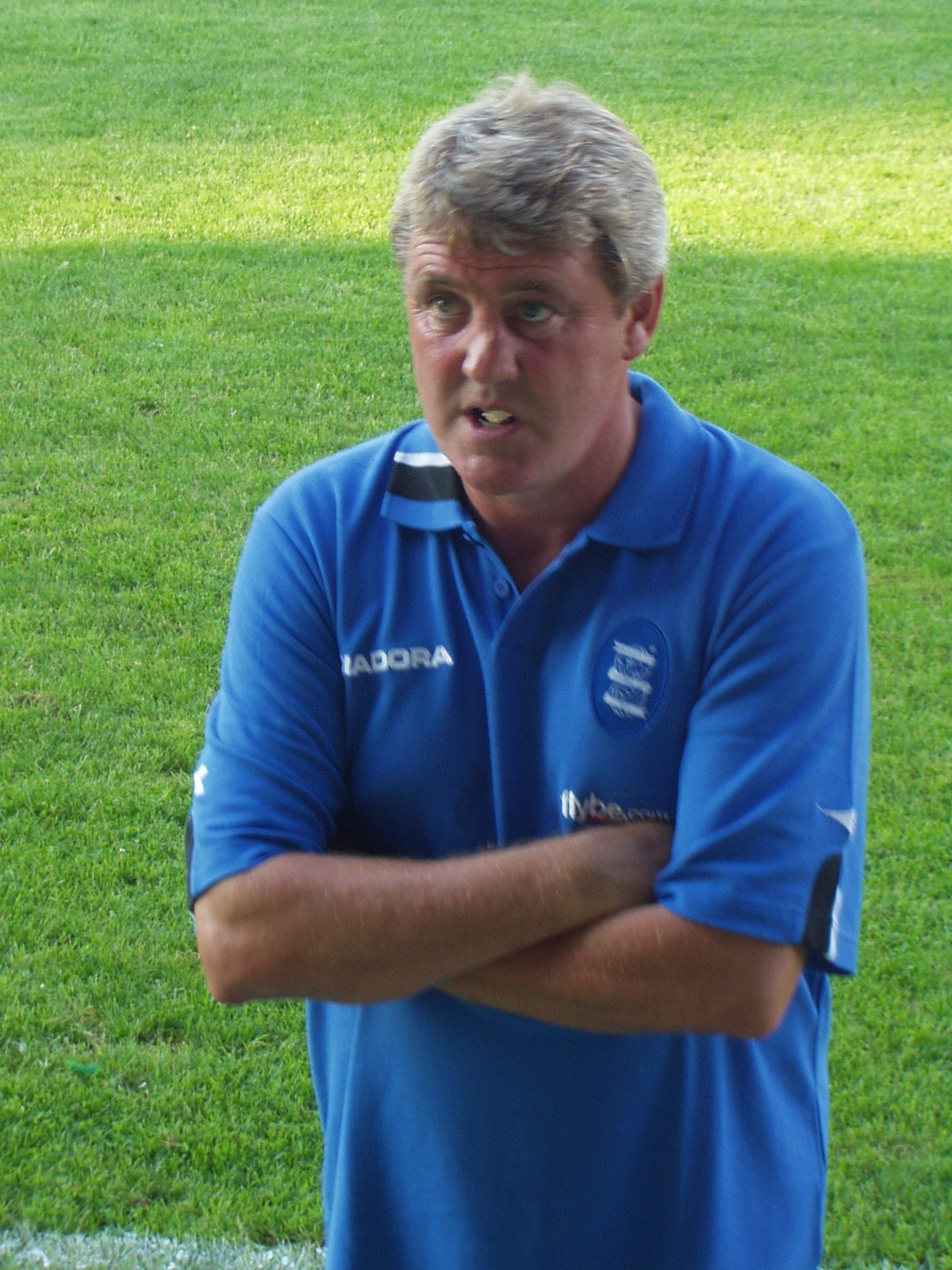
Steve Bruce oversaw Birmingham City's 2002 promotion to the Premier League.

Southend United manager Barry Fry, hired at the cost of a record fine for "poaching", failed to avoid relegation but combined the Division Two title with another victorious trip to Wembley in the Football League Trophy in 1995. After one ineffectual season in the second tier which brought his total of players used up to 61, he was sacked. Trevor Francis introduced Premier League players to the team and took them to the 2001 League Cup final, but three successive play-off semifinal defeats led to his departure by mutual consent. Two months later, after the dispute over his release from previous employers Crystal Palace reached the High Court, Steve Bruce took charge. Bruce, the ninth former player to have served as permanent manager, led the club to promotion via the play-offs in his first season; his tenure of nearly six years made him the club's longest-serving post-war manager. After uncertainty surrounding a takeover bid for the club led him to accept the managerial post at Wigan Athletic, former Scotland manager Alex McLeish was appointed in November 2007.

Unable to avoid relegation at the end of his first part-season, McLeish led the team back to the Premier League at the first attempt in 2009, then guided them to a 12-game unbeaten run, a club record in the top division, and a ninth-place finish, their best since 1959. In 2010–11, his Birmingham team beat Arsenal in the League Cup Final to win their first major trophy in 48 years, but he could not keep them in the top flight, and resigned to take over at Aston Villa. Chris Hughton's team narrowly failed to qualify for the Europa League knockout phase and reached the play-off semi-finals, but with the club in financial turmoil and under a transfer embargo, he left for Premier League Norwich City. Lee Clark led Birmingham to a mid-table finish in his first season, but escaped relegation to the third tier on goal difference via Paul Caddis's stoppage-time equaliser at Bolton Wanderers in the last match of 2013–14. Continuing poor form, with only one home league win in more than a year, brought Clark's dismissal in October 2014. Burton Albion manager and former Birmingham City player Gary Rowett achieved two tenth-place finishes before – with the team just outside the play-off positions, and to widespread surprise – the club's new owners sacked him and his staff and within hours appointed former Italian international player Gianfranco Zola, thus beginning a cycle of apparently ill-thought-out managerial changes.

After four months and 24 matches, during which the team won just twice and dropped to 20th place, three points outside the relegation zone with three matches remaining, Zola resigned. Harry Redknapp kept the team in the Championship, and signed a 12-month contract, but six consecutive losses in the first eight games of 2017–18 season brought about his dismissal. His former assistant Steve Cotterill's six straight defeats came five months later. Garry Monk kept the team out of the relegation places, repeated the feat in 2018–19 despite transfer restrictions and a nine-point deduction for failure to comply with the league's spending rules, and was popular with the fans, but he was sacked after disputes with the ownership over transfer strategy and style of play. His assistant, Pep Clotet, spent five months as caretaker head coach before being appointed on a permanent basis. (Note: When Clotet was appointed caretaker head coach, the club stated it was "not actively seeking an alternative permanent Head Coach or Manager at this time". His position was made permanent on 4 December, and he left by mutual agreement on 8 July 2020.) Before football resumed after the COVID-19-related hiatus, the club announced that he would leave at the end of the season; the team's form plummeted, Clotet left early, they narrowly avoided relegation, and the BBC's West Midlands correspondent opined that the next appointment was "a decision [the board] cannot afford to get wrong if they are to steer clear of further turmoil and confusion." Aitor Karanka lasted six months of a 2020–21 season played behind closed doors before stepping down in favour of Lee Bowyer, who resigned as manager of Charlton Athletic to convert a Birmingham team "hopelessly out of form" into one that went six games unbeaten to secure safety with two matches remaining. At the end of yet another relegation-threatened season, Bowyer was replaced by John Eustace, who stabilised the team and avoided relegation against a background of two high-profile failed takeovers followed by a successful change of ownership.

Two months into the 2023–24 season, with the team in the play-off places, in a move with echoes of Rowett's replacement by Zola, the American owners sacked Eustace, citing "the importance of implementing a winning mentality and a culture of ambition". Former England international player and Derby County and D.C. United manager Wayne Rooney's 9 defeats in 15 games took Birmingham down to 20th place and set a new club record for shortest tenure, of 83 days. Tony Mowbray was appointed in January 2024, but six weeks later medical issues forced his temporary withdrawal from the role. Results were so poor under his assistant, Mark Venus, that the club rehired Gary Rowett as interim manager until the end of the season, but the team were unable to avoid relegation. Mowbray resigned soon afterwards on health grounds, and was replaced by Chris Davies, previously assistant head coach at Tottenham Hotspur, in his first managerial role.

== Managers ==
All first-team matches in national or international competition are counted, except for those in The Combination of 1888–89, the abandoned 1939–40 Football League season and those in wartime leagues and cups. Statistics for the Football Alliance and for the FA Cup before Small Heath F.C.'s 1892 election to the Football League are sourced from Matthews (1995). Dates and statistics thereafter until the end of the 2023–24 season are sourced from the English National Football Archive. Discrepancies are noted and sourced within the table.

- Names of caretaker managers are supplied where known, and periods of caretaker-management are highlighted in italics and marked †.
- Permanent managers who previously played for the club are marked ^{P}.
- Secretary-managers are marked ^{S}.
- Managers whose tenure includes only wartime matches are marked ^{W}.

Win percentage is rounded to one decimal place.

Statistics are complete up to and including the match played on 15 August 2026.

Key

M: Matches played W: Matches won D: Matches drawn L: Matches lost

Table of Birmingham City F.C. managers, including tenure, record and honours
Name	Nationality	From	To	M	W	D	L	Win%	Honours and achievements	Notes
Committee		17 October 1881 (Note: Start date is that of the team's first appearance in national competition, the 4–1 win against Derby Town in the 1881–82 FA Cup.)	1 June 1892	100	46	15	39	46.0		
Alf Jones ^{S}	English	1 July 1892	1 June 1908	566	260	108	198	45.9	Second Division championship 1892–93; Second Division promotion 1893–94, 1900–01, 1902–03	
Alex Watson ^{S}	English	1 July 1908	20 June 1911	118	34	25	59	28.8		
Bob McRoberts ^{P}	Scottish	20 June 1911	30 May 1915	163	65	38	60	39.9		
Frank Richards ^{S}	English	30 May 1915	31 May 1923	173	78	36	59	45.1	Second Division championship 1920–21	
Billy Beer ^{P}	English	31 May 1923	1 March 1927	163	62	36	65	38.0		
Bill Harvey ^{P}	English	1 March 1927	31 May 1928	58	20	16	22	34.5		
Leslie Knighton ^{S}	English	1 July 1928	8 May 1933 (Note: ENFA record Knighton's end date as 31 March 1933, and attribute the remaining ten matches (W3 D3 L4) to a committee. His resignation with the intention of taking over at Chelsea when David Calderhead retired at the end of the season was accepted on 30 March, but on 4 May he was still signing players for Birmingham, and he left on 8 May.)	229	87	51	91	38.0	FA Cup runner-up 1930–31	
George Liddell ^{P}	English	1 July 1933	30 September 1939	267	82	76	109	30.7		(Note: The English National Football Archive (ENFA) includes Birmingham's three matches from the abandoned 1939–40 Football League season, but this list does not.)
Bill Camkin ^{SW}	English	October 1939	16 August 1943	0	0	0	0	—		(Note: During the war, Camkin was honorary managing director of the club and dealt with team affairs while George Blackburn took training. Matthews (1995)'s account that former Rochdale manager Goodier looked after team affairs on a caretaker basis from November 1944 until Storer's appointment at the end of the 1944–45 season is contradicted by contemporary sources. Appointed part-time team manager of Birmingham as of 16 August 1943, with provision for a two-year appointment after the war, Goodier was released on 28 October because of "unexpected domestic difficulties which necessitate[d] his return to Rochdale".)
Ted Goodier ^{W}	English	16 August 1943	28 October 1943	0	0	0	0	—		
Bill Camkin ^{SW}	English	28 October 1943	31 May 1945	0	0	0	0	—		
Harry Storer	English	1 June 1945	29 November 1948	118	60	30	28	50.8	Football League South wartime league championship 1945–46; Second Division championship 1947–48	
Walter Taylor †		30 November 1948	31 January 1949	10	2	4	4	20.0		(Note: The club's chief scout Walter Taylor was appointed assistant team manager shortly after Storer's resignation and acted as caretaker until Brocklebank's appointment.)
Bob Brocklebank	English	31 January 1949	7 October 1954	255	101	67	87	39.6		(Note: Brocklebank resigned on 7 October 1954, and Turner took over officially on 16 November. A committee of the directors, assisted by coach Ray Shaw, handled team affairs in the interim, so the last three matches in October are reallocated from Brocklebank to the committee, and the first two matches in November are likewise reallocated from Turner.)
Committee †		7 October 1954	16 November 1954	5	2	2	1	40.0		
Arthur Turner ^{P}	English	16 November 1954	4 February 1958	164	73	34	57	44.5	Second Division championship 1954–55; Club's highest First Division placing (6th) 1955–56; FA Cup finalist 1955–56	(Note: Turner was the first man to manage an English club side in European competition, when Birmingham played their first group game in the 1955–58 Inter-Cities Fairs Cup on 15 May 1956, a goalless draw away at Internazionale. The competition lasted over three English seasons with the final not played until 1958. Beasley was the first man to manage an English club side to the final of a European competition. The home leg of the 1960 Fairs Cup Final against Barcelona, a goalless draw, was played on 29 March 1960; Barcelona won the away leg 4–1. (The London XI, a representative side made up of players from several London clubs, were the first English team to play in European competition and to reach a European final.))
Arthur Turner ^{P}; Pat Beasley	English; English	4 February 1958	4 September 1958	18	6	5	7	33.3		
Pat Beasley	English	4 September 1958	23 May 1960	95	39	20	36	41.1	Inter-Cities Fairs Cup runner-up 1958–60	
Gil Merrick ^{P}	English	1 June 1960	28 April 1964	202	64	46	92	31.7	Inter-Cities Fairs Cup runner-up 1960–61; League Cup winner 1962–63	
Joe Mallett	English	1 July 1964	27 December 1965	66	15	16	35	22.7		
Stan Cullis	English	27 December 1965	18 March 1970	214	87	51	76	40.7		
Don Dorman †; Bill Shorthouse †	English; English	18 March 1970	29 May 1970	6	1	0	5	16.7		
Freddie Goodwin	English	29 May 1970	18 September 1975	270	99	84	87	36.7	Second Division promotion 1971–72	
Willie Bell	Scottish	18 September 1975	5 September 1977	91	28	20	43	30.8		
Sir Alf Ramsey	English	8 September 1977	6 March 1978	28	11	4	13	39.3		
Jim Smith	English	12 March 1978	15 February 1982	182	59	50	73	32.4	Second Division promotion 1979–80	
Norman Bodell †	English	15 February 1982	22 February 1982	2	1	0	1	50.0		
Ron Saunders	English	22 February 1982	16 January 1986	202	72	53	77	35.6	Second Division promotion 1984–85	
Keith Leonard †	English	16 January 1986	22 January 1986	1	0	0	1	0.0		
John Bond	English	23 January 1986	27 May 1987	65	17	20	28	26.2		
Garry Pendrey ^{P}	English	28 May 1987	26 April 1989	98	20	27	51	20.4		
Dave Mackay	Scottish	26 April 1989	23 January 1991	91	34	27	30	37.4		
Bill Coldwell †	English	23 January 1991	7 February 1991	3	2	1	0	66.7		
Lou Macari	Scottish	7 February 1991	18 June 1991	24	12	6	6	50.0	Associate Members' Cup 1990–91	
Terry Cooper	English	9 August 1991	29 November 1993	135	48	36	51	35.6	Third Division promotion 1991–92	
Kevan Broadhurst †; Trevor Morgan †	English; English	29 November 1993	10 December 1993	1	0	0	1	0.0		
Barry Fry	English	10 December 1993	7 May 1996	156	68	44	44	43.6	Football League Trophy 1994–95; Second Division (level 3) championship 1994–95	
Trevor Francis ^{P}	English	10 May 1996	15 October 2001	290	139	70	81	47.9	League Cup finalist 2000–01	
Mick Mills †; Jim Barron †	English; English	15 October 2001	12 December 2001	12	5	4	3	41.7		
Steve Bruce ^{P}	English	12 December 2001	23 November 2007	269	100	69	100	37.2	First Division (level 2) promotion 2001–02; The Championship (level 2) promotion 2006–07	(Note: Wigan Athletic announced Bruce as their new manager on 19 November, but a financial dispute meant he did not officially leave Birmingham until 23 November, when Black was confirmed as caretaker.)
Eric Black †	Scottish	23 November 2007	27 November 2007	1	0	0	1	0.0		
Alex McLeish	Scottish	28 November 2007	12 June 2011	168	62	51	55	36.9	The Championship (level 2) promotion 2008–09; League Cup winner 2010–11	
Chris Hughton	Irish	22 June 2011	7 June 2012	62	26	21	15	41.9		
Lee Clark	English	26 June 2012	20 October 2014	116	33	35	48	28.4		
Richard Beale †; Malcolm Crosby †	English	20 October 2014	27 October 2014	2	0	0	2	0.0		
Gary Rowett ^{P}	English	27 October 2014	14 December 2016	106	42	32	32	39.6		
Gianfranco Zola	Italian	14 December 2016	17 April 2017	24	2	8	14	8.3		
Harry Redknapp	English	18 April 2017	16 September 2017	13	4	1	8	30.8		
Lee Carsley †	Irish	16 September 2017	1 October 2017	3	1	1	1	33.3		(Note: Cotterill's appointment was announced on 29 September 2017 but did not take effect until 2 October. The intervening match, a 6–1 defeat at Hull City, was taken by Carsley.)
Steve Cotterill	English	2 October 2017	3 March 2018	27	7	5	15	25.9		
Garry Monk	English	5 March 2018	18 June 2019	59	19	20	20	32.2		
Pep Clotet	Spanish	20 June 2019	8 July 2020	47	13	15	19	27.7		
Steve Spooner †; Craig Gardner †	English; English	9 July 2020	30 July 2020	4	0	1	3	0.0		
Aitor Karanka	Spanish	31 July 2020	16 March 2021	38	8	11	19	21.1		
Lee Bowyer ^{P}	English	16 March 2021	2 July 2022	59	17	16	26	28.8		
John Eustace	English	3 July 2022	9 October 2023	63	21	16	26	33.3		
Wayne Rooney	English	11 October 2023	2 January 2024	15	2	4	9	13.3		
Steve Spooner †	English	2 January 2024	8 January 2024	1	0	1	0	0.0		
Tony Mowbray	English	8 January 2024	21 May 2024	8	4	1	3	50.0		(Note: Mowbray was appointed on 8 January 2024, and was in charge of eight matches before the need for medical treatment forced his withdrawal from the role on 19 February; his assistant, Mark Venus, took charge of the team with immediate effect. On 19 March, after a draw and five defeats left the team outside the relegation zone only on goal difference, Mowbray took formal medical leave until the start of 2024–25 pre-season, and Gary Rowett returned to the club as interim manager. On 21 May, Mowbray resigned, stating: "Over the very recent days, it has become apparent to me that I will not be fully fit to resume my duties as Manager of Birmingham City in the timescale that would allow the Club to best prepare for the forthcoming season and therefore, I have regrettably decided to step away from my role at this time. Once I have fully recovered, it is important to me that I then spend some quality time with my wife and my boys before I fully commit to work.")
Mark Venus †	English	19 February 2024	19 March 2024	6	0	1	5	0.0		
Gary Rowett †	English	19 March 2024	5 May 2024	8	3	2	3	37.5		
Chris Davies	Welsh	6 June 2024	present	112	64	25	23	57.1	League One (level 3) championship 2024–25; EFL Trophy finalist 2024–25	

== Sources ==
- Matthews, Tony (1995). Birmingham City: A Complete Record. Derby: Breedon Books. ISBN 978-1-85983-010-9.
- Matthews, Tony (2000). The Encyclopedia of Birmingham City Football Club 1875–2000. Cradley Heath: Britespot. ISBN 978-0-9539288-0-4.
- Matthews, Tony (2010). Birmingham City: The Complete Record. Derby: Derby Books. ISBN 978-1-85983-853-2.
- McKinstry, Leo (2006). Sir Alf. London: Harper Sport. ISBN 978-0-00-719378-3.
