= Willcox (surname) =

Willcox is a surname. Notable people with the surname include:

- Abbey Willcox, Australian freestyle skier
- Anita Parkhurst Willcox, American artist, feminist and pacifist
- Sir Charles Willcox, South Australian businessman and politician, and a mayor of the City of Adelaide
- Cornelis DeWitt Willcox, American soldier and military writer
- Louise Collier Willcox (1865–1929), American author, editor, anthologist, translator, suffragist
- Mary Alice Willcox, American zoologist
- Orlando Bolivar Willcox, American Civil War general
- Peter Willcox, American Greenpeace activist
- Reece Willcox, Canadian ice hockey player
- Sheila Willcox, British equestrian
- Spiegle Willcox, American jazz saxophonist
- Tim Willcox, British television personality
- Thomas Willcox (1689–1779), American colonial-era paper mill owner
- Toyah Willcox, British singer and actress
- Walter Francis Willcox, American statistician

== See also ==
- Wilcock
- Wilcox (disambiguation)
- Wilcox (surname)
- Willcock
- Willcocks
- Willock
- Wilcoxon
