= Willcocks =

Willcocks is a surname, and may refer to the following:

- Dianne Willcocks, Dianne Marie Willcocks CBE (born 5 May 1945 was the Vice-Chancellor of York St John University until retirement in April 2010
- Sir David Willcocks (1919–2015), British choral conductor and composer
- James Willcocks, General Sir James Willcocks GCB GCMG KCSI DSO (1 April 1857 – 18 December 1926) was a British Army officer
- Jonathan Willcocks, British composer
- Joseph Willcocks (1773–1814), Canadian publisher, soldier, and political figure
- Leslie Willcocks, Leslie P. Willcocks, a professor of Technology Work and Globalization and governor of the Information Systems and Innovation Group at the London School of Economics
- Michael Willcocks (born 1944), British General, Gentleman Usher of the Black Rod for the UK House of Lords
- William Willcocks (1852–1932), British civil engineer
- M. P. Willcocks (1869–1952), English writer and suffragist

== See also ==
- Wilcock
- Wilcox (disambiguation)
- Wilcox (surname)
- Willcock
- Willcox (disambiguation)
- Willcox (surname)
- Willock
- Wilcoxon
