= Wilcox Township =

Wilcox Township may refer to the following places:

- Wilcox Township, Hancock County, Illinois
- Wilcox Township, Trego County, Kansas
- Wilcox Township, Newaygo County, Michigan
- Wilcox Township, Roger Mills County, Oklahoma

See also

- Wilcox (disambiguation)
