= William Wilcox =

William Wilcox may refer to:

- William Cullen Wilcox (1850–1928), American missionary to South Africa
- William Wilcox (footballer) (active 1910s–1925), English footballer
- William H. Wilcox, American soldier and Medal of Honor recipient
- William Jenkins Wilcox Jr.(1923–2013), American chemist and historian
- W. Bradford Wilcox (born 1970), professor of sociology at the University of Virginia

== See also ==
- William Willcox (disambiguation)
- William Willcocks (1852–1932), engineer
- William Wilcocks, MP for New Romney
