= John Wilcox =

John Wilcox may refer to:

- John Wilcox (Master of Clare College, Cambridge) (1692–1762), Master of Clare 1736–1762
- John Allen Wilcox (1819–1864), American politician
- John W. Wilcox Jr. (1882–1942), American admiral
- Jack Wilcox (1886–1940), British footballer
- John Wilcox (cinematographer) (1913–1979), British cinematographer
- John M. Wilcox (1925–1983), American physicist
- John Wilcox (American football) (born 1938), American football defensive tackle
- Firpo Wilcox (born 1901), American football tackle
- John Wilcox (cricketer) (born 1940), British cricketer
