= Wilcox, Texas =

Wilcox, Texas may refer to the following places:

- Wilcox, Burleson County, Texas, in Burleson County, Texas
- Wilcox, Somervell County, Texas

== See also ==
- Wilcox (disambiguation)
