= Wilcocks =

Wilcocks is a surname. Notable people with the surname include:

- Alexander Wilcocks (1741—1801), American lawyer and Revolutionary War supporter
- Joseph Wilcocks (1673–1756), British Anglican bishop
- Philip Wilcocks (born 1953), British Royal Navy admiral

== See also ==
- Willcocks
- Wilcox
