= Wilcockson =

Wilcockson is a surname. Notable people with the surname include:

- Stan Wilcockson (1905–1965), English footballer
- Steve Wilcockson (born 1951), British Anglican priest

== See also ==
- Wilcocks
