= Bob Fairman =

English footballer

Personal information
- Full name: Robert Samuel Fairman
- Date of birth: 13 July 1883
- Place of birth: Southampton, England
- Date of death: June 1968 (age 84)
- Place of death: Abingdon, Berkshire
- Height: 5 ft 11 in (1.80 m)
- Positions: Full back; wing half

Senior career*
Years	Team	Apps	(Gls)
–	Southampton	0	(0)
1907–1909	Birmingham	22	(2)
1909–1912	West Ham United	90	(0)
1912–1917	Birmingham	16	(0)
- * Club domestic league appearances and goals

Robert Samuel Fairman (13 July 1883 – 1968) was an English footballer who played as a full back or wing half. He scored two goals in 38 appearances in the Football League over two spells for Birmingham, and played 90 Southern League matches for West Ham United.

Fairman was born in Southampton, Hampshire. He began his football career with Southampton, although he never played a first-team match, before joining Birmingham in 1907. He played regularly at left half at the start of the 1908–09 season, but lost his place when the club signed Thomas Daykin, and he moved to West Ham United, then a Southern League club, at the end of the season. He spent three years with West Ham, playing more than 100 games in all competitions, before returning to Birmingham in 1912. He played little first-team football after his return, and retired from the game in 1917.
