= John Wilcox (cricketer) =

English cricketer and headmaster

Personal information
- Full name: John Warren Theodore Wilcox
- Born: 16 August 1940 (age 86); Newton Abbot, Devon, England
- Batting: Right-handed
- Relatives: Denys Wilcox (father)

Domestic team information
- Years: Team
- 1961–1962: Cambridge University
- 1964–1967: Essex

Career statistics
Competition	FC	List A
Matches	31	1
Runs scored	903	2
Batting average	19.21	2.00
100s/50s	0/5	0/0
Top score	87	2
Balls bowled	0	0
Wickets	–	–
Bowling average	–	–
5 wickets in innings	–	–
10 wickets in match	–	–
Best bowling	–	–
Catches/stumpings	15/–	0/–
- Source: Cricinfo, 21 October 2016

John Wilcox (born 16 August 1940) is a former English cricketer and headmaster.

== Cricket career ==
Wilcox was born in Newton Abbot. After attending Alleyn Court Prep School and Malvern College, he went up to Pembroke College, Cambridge. A right-handed batsman and occasional right-arm off-break bowler, he began his first-class cricket career with Cambridge University in 1961, his debut coming against Kent. He played eleven further first-class matches for Cambridge until the end of 1962, but he did not win a blue for cricket. He did, however, win blues for rackets and real tennis.

Wilcox made his debut County Championship appearance for Essex in 1964, six years after his debut in the Minor Counties Championship for the Essex Second XI. Wilcox's first appearance, against Northamptonshire, finished in an innings defeat. Towards the end of the 1964 season, he scored 46 not out in a game against the touring Australians that Essex won. Essex finished the 1964 season in tenth place, an improvement on the previous year's performance. Wilcox scored 367 runs in 10 matches at an average of 36.70, with three fifties.

Wilcox made his highest score in May 1965 when, going in to bat against Worcestershire with Essex at 154 for 6, he added 139 for the seventh wicket with Trevor Bailey and finished with 87. Essex won by 48 runs. Nevertheless, he made only four Championship appearances that season, finding himself out of the team after a second-innings duck against Somerset, and he did not appear in the County Championship again until August 1967, when he played his last four matches.

Wilcox's father Denys played first-class cricket for Essex for nearly 20 years, captaining the team for six years before the Second World War.

== Later career ==
Wilcox played for Essex only when his duties as a schoolmaster allowed. He taught at Alleyn Court Prep School in Westcliff-on-Sea, which his grandfather had founded in 1904, and where his father had been headmaster. John also became headmaster of Alleyn Court, serving in that position from 1968 to 1990. He was then the chairman of the school board for 20 years, and remains on the school's board of trustees. In 2005 he wrote the school's centenary history, Impressions of a Family School: 100 Years of Alleyn Court.

After he retired from teaching in 1990 he founded the Court Gallery in West Quantoxhead, Somerset. The gallery specialises in British and French art from 1880 onwards.
