= Silcock =

Silcock is a surname. Notable people with the surname include:

- Burton W. Silcock (1922–2008), American Director of the Bureau of Land Management
- Dick Silcock, English rugby league footballer
- Frank Silcock (1838-1897), English cricketer and founding member of Essex County Cricket Club
- H. T. Silcock (1882–1969), English Quaker missionary
- Hannah Silcock (born 2004), English footballer
- Helen Silcock (1865-1951), English trade unionist and suffragette
- Jack Silcock (1898–1966), English Association footballer
- Marc Silcock (born 1988), British actor
- Nat Silcock Jr. (1927–1992), English rugby league footballer who played in the 1940s, 1950s and 1960s, and coached in the 1960s
- Nat Silcock Sr., English rugby league footballer who played in the 1920s and 1930s
- Sarah Silcock (1848–1943), New Zealand woodcarver and craftswoman
- Thomas Ball Silcock (1854–1924), British Liberal Party politician
- William Silcock (1868–1933), English cricketer

== See also ==
- BOCM Silcock, a former British company
- Silcock Family, a family from Huntington Beach, California, USA
- Matthew Silcocks (born 1993), Australian Paralympian
- Sillcock (also "Silcock"), a form of valve
- Silcox (disambiguation)
