= Edward Wilcox =

Edward Wilcox or Wilcocks may refer to:

- Eddie Wilcox (1907–1968), American jazz pianist and arranger
- Edward A. Wilcox (1830–1910), American physician and politician
- Edward Walton Wilcox, American painter and sculptor
- Edward Wilcox (politician), American politician, lieutenant governor of Rhode Island, 1817–1821, and briefly governor
- Edward Wilcocks, MP for New Romney
