= Billy Smith (footballer, born 1882) =

English footballer

Personal information
- Full name: William Alfred Smith
- Date of birth: April 1882
- Place of birth: West Bromwich, England
- Date of death: Unknown
- Position: Forward

Senior career*
Years	Team	Apps	(Gls)
- Old Hill Wanderers
- Worcester City
1902–1905	West Bromwich Albion	21	(2)
1905–190?	Brierley Hill Alliance		
190?–1907	Tipton Excelsior		
1907–1908	Coventry City		
1908–1909	Birmingham	17	(5)
1909–1912	Coventry City	63	(24)
1912–1913	Nuneaton Town	27	(13)
1913–1914	Coventry City	15	(0)
- Tipton Excelsior
- * Club domestic league appearances and goals

William Alfred Smith (April 1882 – after 1912) was an English professional footballer who made 38 appearances in the Football League playing for West Bromwich Albion and Birmingham. He played as a right-sided forward.

Smith was born in West Bromwich, Staffordshire. He began his football career with Old Hill Wanderers and Worcester City before joining Second Division champions West Bromwich Albion in 1902. He played 21 league games for the club before dropping back into non-league football with Brierley Hill Alliance. In 1908 he returned to the Football League with Birmingham, where he formed a useful partnership with Benny Green. He lost his place when Jack Wilcox arrived, and moved back to Coventry City. A period with Birmingham Combination club Nuneaton Town preceded a third spell at Coventry.
