= Denys Wilcox =

English cricketer

Personal information
- Full name: Denys Robert Wilcox
- Born: 4 June 1910; Westcliff-on-Sea, Essex, England
- Died: 6 February 1953 (aged 42); Westcliff-on-Sea, Essex, England
- Batting: Right-handed
- Role: Batsman
- Relatives: John Wilcox (son)

Domestic team information
- Years: Team
- 1928–1951: Essex

Career statistics
Competition	FC
Matches	179
Runs scored	8399
Batting average	29.47
100s/50s	15/42
Top score	157
Balls bowled	173
Wickets	3
Bowling average	45.33
5 wickets in innings	0
10 wickets in match	0
Best bowling	1/0
Catches/stumpings	130/0
- Source: Cricinfo, 21 July 2013

Denys Wilcox (4 June 1910 – 6 February 1953) was an English cricketer and schoolmaster.

== Career ==
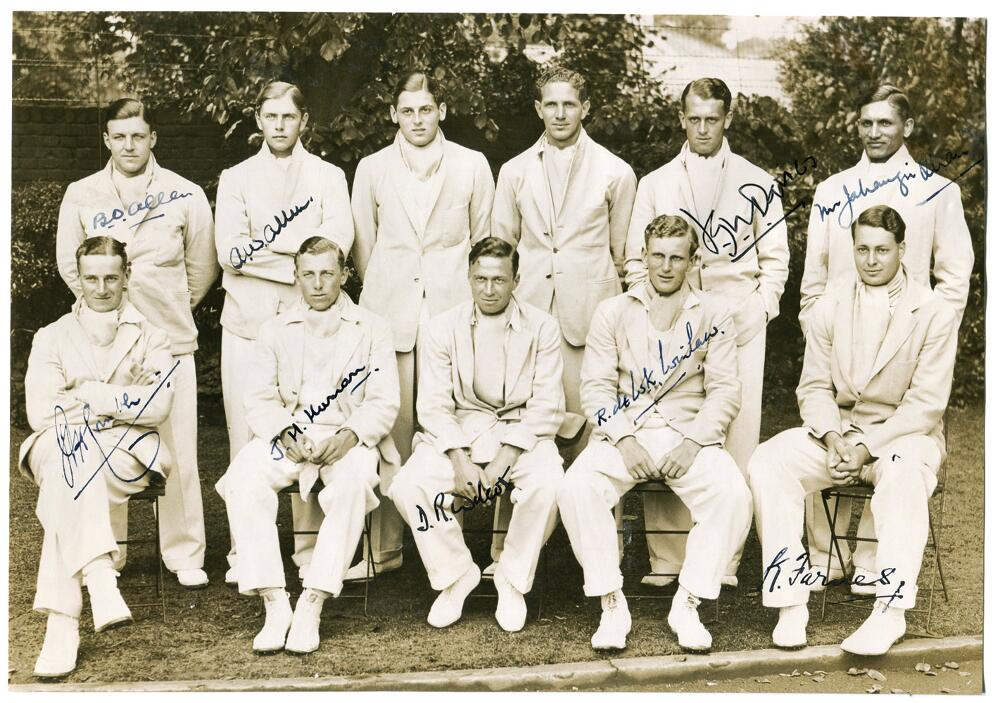
Cambridge University Team 1933

Wilcox scored more than 1000 runs in his last season at Dulwich College, then went up to Cambridge University. He played three years for the university team, scoring a century in the University Match in 1932 and captaining them in 1933.

He played for Essex between 1928 and 1947, and made a few appearances for Free Foresters in first-class matches after his Essex career ended, playing his final game in 1951. In 1946 he and Reginald Taylor set a record 8th-wicket partnership for Essex of 263 runs. He was joint captain of Essex from 1933 to 1939 and captained The Rest against an England team in a trial match for test selection in 1938.

He played as an amateur, spending most of his time on his duties as headmaster of Alleyn Court Prep School in Westcliff-on-Sea, which his father had founded in 1904. He was a considerable influence on the early career of Trevor Bailey, a pupil at Alleyn Court who also played for Dulwich School, Cambridge and Essex. Wilcox's son John, who also played for Essex, also later became headmaster of Alleyn Court. Denys Wilcox died of leukemia in 1953 at the age of 42.
