= Frederick Kerns =

English footballer

Personal information
- Date of birth: 1883
- Place of birth: London, England
- Date of death: Unknown
- Position: Forward

Senior career*
Years	Team	Apps	(Gls)
1906–1908	Aston Villa	0	(0)
1908–1909	Birmingham	1	(0)
1909–19??	Bristol Rovers	0	(0)
- * Club domestic league appearances and goals

Frederick Kerns (1883 – after 1908) was an English professional footballer who played in the Football League for Birmingham.

Kerns was born in Paddington, London. He was yet to play first-team football when he joined Birmingham as a makeweight in the December 1908 deal which took Edmund Eyre to Aston Villa and Fred Chapple in the other direction. He failed to impress in Birmingham's reserves, and appeared only once in the Second Division, on 2 January 1909 playing at inside right in a 2–2 draw at home to Gainsborough Trinity. At the end of the 1908–09 season he moved on to Bristol Rovers, but never appeared for their first team.
