= Tom Handley =

English footballer

Personal information
- Full name: Thomas Henry Handley
- Date of birth: 22 February 1886
- Place of birth: Birmingham, England
- Date of death: 4 August 1962 (aged 76)
- Place of death: Birmingham, England
- Position: Half back

Senior career*
Years	Team	Apps	(Gls)
- Kings Norton Metal Works
1907–1909	Birmingham	13	(0)
1909–1911	Bradford	26	(0)
- * Club domestic league appearances and goals

Thomas Henry Handley (22 February 1886 – 4 August 1962), also known as Harry Handley, was an English professional footballer who played in the Football League for Birmingham and Bradford. He played as a half back.

Handley was born in the Cotteridge district of Birmingham, and played football for his works team, Kings Norton Metal Works, before joining Birmingham in 1907 as cover at half back. He made his debut in the First Division on Boxing Day 1907, replacing the injured Walter Wigmore for a game away at Notts County which finished goalless. Though he did not play again that season, he finished the 1908–09 season in the Second Division as first-choice centre-half, but was then unexpectedly allowed to leave. He signed for fellow Second Division club Bradford, where he spent two seasons.
