= Silcox =

Silcox may refer to:

== People ==
- Deborah Silcox, American politician
- Ferdinand A. Silcox (1882–1939), Chief of the United States Forest Service
- Lucy Mary Silcox (1862–1947), English headteacher and feminist
- Mark Silcox, British comedian and actor
- Nicholas Silcox (born 1989), Australian lightweight rower
- Wesley Silcox (born 1985), American rodeo cowboy

== Places ==
- Silcox Creek, in Manitoba, Canada
- Silcox Hut, mountain lodge in Oregon
- Silcox Island, inhabited island in American Lake in Pierce County, Washington

== See also ==
- Silcock (disambiguation)
- Wilcox (disambiguation)
