= Rocky Run-Wilcox Township, Illinois =

Rocky Run-Wilcox Township
- Township
- Township building on Illinois Route 96

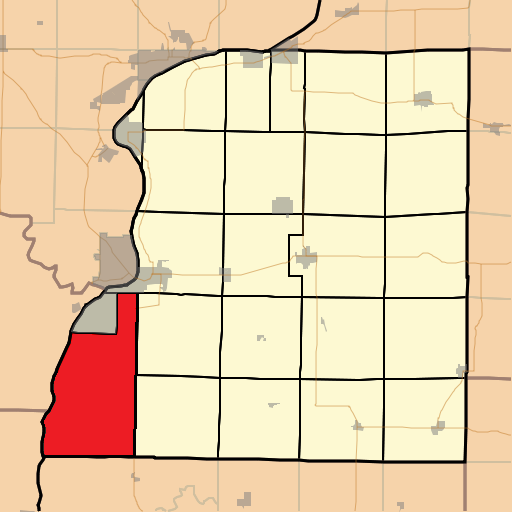
- Location in Hancock County

- Hancock County's location in Illinois
- Coordinates: 40°17′20″N 91°26′18″W
- Country: United States
- State: Illinois
- County: Hancock
- Established: February 1, 2017

Area
  - Total: 60.93 sq mi (157.8 km^{2})
  - Land: 56.80 sq mi (147.1 km^{2})
  - Water: 4.13 sq mi (10.7 km^{2}) 6.77%

Population (2020)
  - Total: 282
  - Density: 4.96/sq mi (1.92/km^{2})
- Time zone: UTC-6 (CST)
  - Summer (DST): UTC-5 (CDT)
- ZIP codes: 62373, 62379
- GNIS feature ID: 2797203
- FIPS code: 17-067-65240

Rocky Run-Wilcox Township is one of the twenty-four townships in Hancock County, Illinois, United States. It was created after a referendum merged Wilcox Township and Rocky Run Township. As of the 2020 census, its population was 282 and it contained 149 housing units.

== History ==
Rocky Run Township was established November 6, 1849. Wilcox Township was established November 15, 1855 after neighboring Warsaw Township became coterminous with Warsaw, Illinois.

After population decline left both townships with too few individuals interested in serving as elected officials in the township, a referendum to merge was passed by voters in both townships. That same election, a similar consolidation referendum was passed in Montgomery County, but failed in Ogle County. The Hancock County Board voted to name the new township Rocky Run-Wilcox Township over then-Wilcox Supervisor Duane Taylor's proposed Green Plains Township.

== Geography ==
According to the 2021 census gazetteer files, Rocky Run-Wilcox Township has a total area of 60.93 square miles (157.81 km^{2}), of which 56.80 square miles (147.11 km^{2}) (or 93.23%) is land and 4.13 square miles (10.70 km^{2}) (or 6.77%) is water. There are no incorporated communities in the township.

== Government ==
On April 4, 2017, the Republican slate ran nearly unopposed and won each office in the township. Former Wilcox Supervisor Duane Taylor finished fifth for four trustee positions in the only contested township election.

Office	Officeholder	Party	Took office
Supervisor	Larry Mulch	Republican	May 2017
Clerk	Joanne Beeler	Republican	May 2017
Highway Commissioner	Brock Yuskis	Republican	May 2017
Trustee	Russell Beeler	Republican	May 2017
Trustee	Cindy Roskamp	Republican	May 2017
Trustee	Marlene Beeler	Republican	May 2017
Trustee	Rodney Yuskis	Republican	May 2017

== Demographics ==
As of the 2020 census there were 282 people, 84 households, and 39 families residing in the township. The population density was 4.63 inhabitants per square mile (1.79/km^{2}). There were 149 housing units at an average density of 2.45 per square mile (0.95/km^{2}). The racial makeup of the township was 96.10% White, 0.00% African American, 0.35% Native American, 0.00% Asian, 0.35% Pacific Islander, 0.35% from other races, and 2.84% from two or more races. Hispanic or Latino of any race were 1.77% of the population.

There were 84 households, out of which 14.30% had children under the age of 18 living with them, 46.43% were married couples living together, none had a female householder with no spouse present, and 53.57% were non-families. 36.90% of all households were made up of individuals, and 27.40% had someone living alone who was 65 years of age or older. The average household size was 2.06 and the average family size was 2.87.

The township's age distribution consisted of 16.2% under the age of 18, 3.5% from 18 to 24, 12.1% from 25 to 44, 41% from 45 to 64, and 27.2% who were 65 years of age or older. The median age was 55.1 years. For every 100 females, there were 198.3 males. For every 100 females age 18 and over, there were 184.3 males.

The median income for a household in the township was $68,750. Males had a median income of $41,875 versus $100,556 for females. The per capita income for the township was $67,386. No families and 1.7% of the population were below the poverty line, including none of those under age 18 and none of those age 65 or over.

Historical population
Census	Pop.	Note	%±
2020	282		—
