= William Willcox =

William Willcox may refer to:

- William Willcox (toxicologist) (1870-1941), English physician and toxicologist
- William H. Willcox (1832–1929), American architect and surveyor
- William B. Willcox (1907–1985), American historian
- William Russell Willcox (1863–1940), American politician

== See also ==
- William Wilcox (disambiguation)
