= Rocky Run Township, Illinois =

Rocky Run Township
- Township
- Location in Hancock County

- Hancock County's location in Illinois
- Coordinates: 40°14′43″N 91°26′18″W
- Country: United States
- State: Illinois
- County: Hancock
- Established: November 6, 1849

Area
  - Total: 39.87 sq mi (103.3 km^{2})
  - Land: 36.68 sq mi (95.0 km^{2})
  - Water: 3.19 sq mi (8.3 km^{2}) 8.00%
- Elevation: 479 ft (146 m)

Population (2010)
  - Estimate (2016): 154
  - Density: 4.3/sq mi (1.7/km^{2})
- Time zone: UTC-6 (CST)
  - Summer (DST): UTC-5 (CDT)
- ZIP codes: 62373, 62379
- FIPS code: 17-067-65234

Rocky Run Township was a township in Hancock County, Illinois, USA. As of the 2010 census, its population was 158 and it contained 60 housing units. In November 2016, the township voted to merge with Wilcox Township due to low population. It is now part of Rocky Run-Wilcox Township.

== Geography ==
According to the 2010 census, the township has a total area of 39.87 square miles (103.3 km^{2}), of which 36.68 square miles (95.0 km^{2}) (or 92.00%) is land and 3.19 square miles (8.3 km^{2}) (or 8.00%) is water.

=== Cemeteries ===
The township contains these four cemeteries: Crenshaw, Fletcher, Mount Vernon Missionary Baptist and Oak Valley Missionary. Daugherty

=== Major highways ===
- Illinois Route 96

=== Airports and landing strips ===
- H Meeker Airport
- Meeker Airport

== Demographics ==
Historical population
Census	Pop.	Note	%±
2016 (est.)	154
U.S. Decennial Census

== School districts ==
- Community Unit School District 4
- Warsaw Community Unit School District 316

== Political districts ==
- Illinois's 17th congressional district
- State House District 94
- State Senate District 47
