= William H. Wilcox =

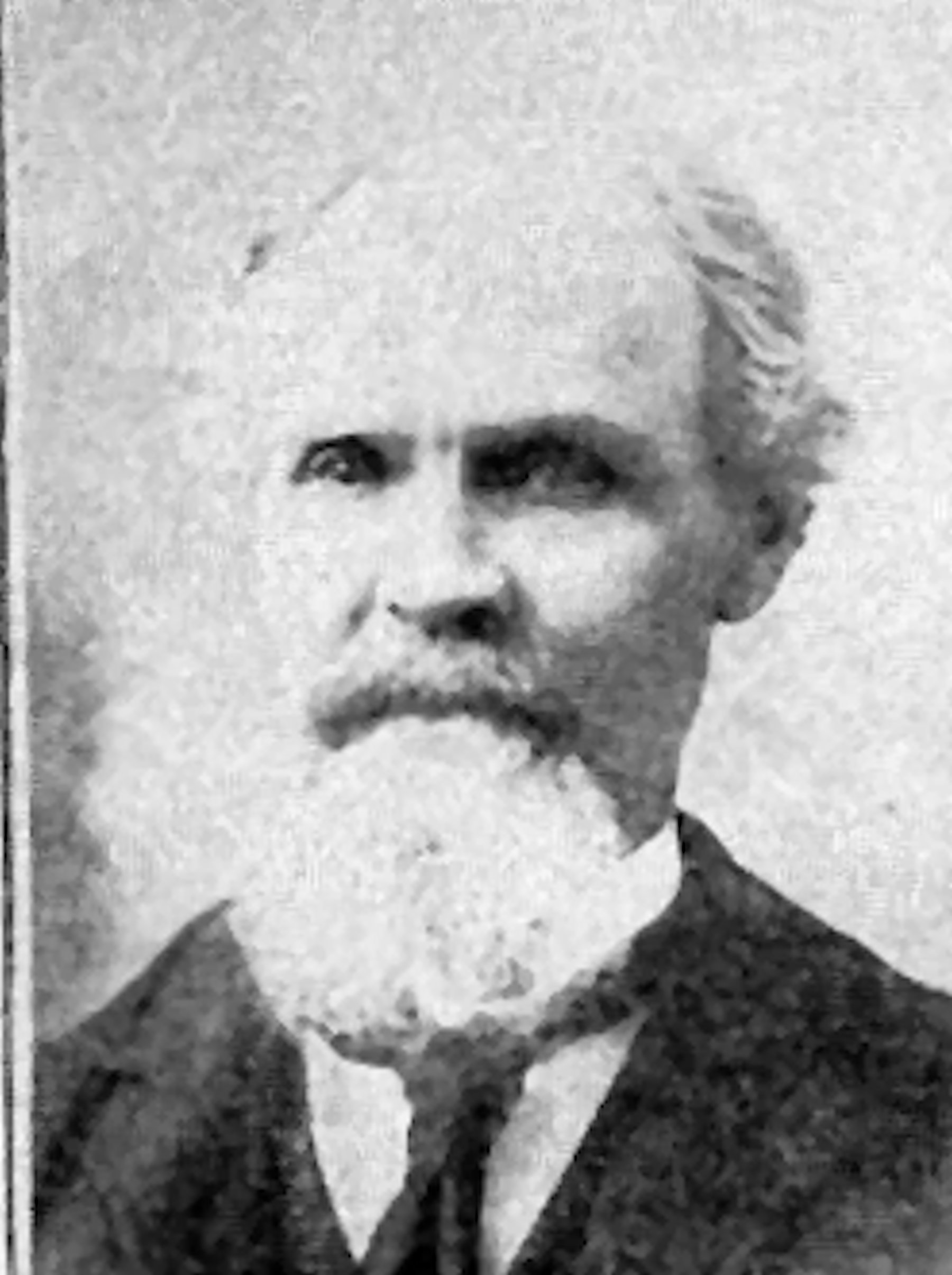
- Born: November 12, 1840; Lempster, New Hampshire
- Died: October 27, 1913 (aged 72); Kalamazoo, Michigan
- Military career
- Rank: Sergeant
- Unit: 9th New Hampshire Infantry
- Awards: Medal of Honor

William H. Wilcox (November 12, 1840 – October 27, 1913) was an American soldier who was awarded the Medal of Honor for his actions in the American Civil War.

== Biography ==
William H. Wilcox was born November 12, 1840, in Lempster, New Hampshire. He joined the 9th New Hampshire Infantry from his home town and served as a sergeant. He earned his medal at the Battle of Spotsylvania Court House, Virginia, on May 12, 1864. After the Civil War, Wilcox died in Kalamazoo, Michigan on October 27, 1913, and is buried in Lake View Cemetery, South Haven.

== Medal of Honor citation ==
For extraordinary heroism on 12 May 1864, in action at Spotsylvania, Virginia. Sergeant Wilcox took command of his company, deployed as skirmishers, after the officers in command of the skirmish line had both been wounded, conducting himself gallantly; afterwards, becoming separated from command, he asked and obtained permission to fight in another company.
