= Edward Walton Wilcox =

American painter and sculptor

Edward Walton Wilcox is an American painter and sculptor. Originally from West Palm Beach, Florida, Wilcox earned a BFA in Painting with high honors from the University of Florida, where he also received the Presidential Award for Excellence in the Arts.
