= Charles Jones (footballer) =

English footballer

Personal information
- Date of birth: July 1888
- Place of birth: Birmingham, England
- Date of death: Unknown
- Position: Outside left

Senior career*
Years	Team	Apps	(Gls)
- Verity's Works
1908–1909	Birmingham	1	(0)
1909–19??	Bristol Rovers	5	(0)
- * Club domestic league appearances and goals

Charles T. Jones (July 1888 – after 1909) was an English footballer who played in the Football League for Birmingham.

Jones was born in the Moseley district of Birmingham. An outside left, described as "speedy but not particularly accurate with his crosses", he began his football career with his works team before joining Birmingham in 1908. He made his debut, which was also his only appearance, in the Football League Second Division on 30 January 1909 in a 1–1 draw at Burnley. Later that year he joined Bristol Rovers of the Southern League, for whom he appeared occasionally as deputy for Billy Peplow.
