= George Travers =

English footballer

Personal information
- Full name: James Edward Travers
- Date of birth: 19 July 1887
- Place of birth: Waterloo, London, England
- Date of death: 6 December 1943 (aged 56)
- Place of death: Palmerston North, New Zealand
- Position: Forward

Youth career
- 1904–1905: Bilston United
- 1905–1906: Rowley United

Senior career*
Years	Team	Apps	(Gls)
1906–1907	Wolverhampton Wanderers	0	(0)
1907–1908	Birmingham	2	(0)
1908–1909	Aston Villa	4	(4)
1909–1910	Queens Park Rangers	34	(7)
1910–1911	Leicester Fosse	12	(5)
1911–1914	Barnsley	84	(23)
1914–1919	Manchester United	21	(4)
- → Tottenham Hotspur (guest)
1919–1920	Swindon Town	34	(12)
1920	Millwall	2	(0)
1920–1921	Norwich City	29	(11)
1921	Gillingham	10	(1)
1921–1922	Nuneaton Town		
1922–1929	Cradley St Luke's		
1929–1931	Bilston United		
- * Club domestic league appearances and goals

James Edward Travers (19 July 1887 – 6 December 1943), known as George Travers, was an English professional footballer who played as an inside forward or centre forward. He made 164 appearances in the Football League, representing a number of clubs prior to and just after the First World War.

== Life and career ==
Travers was born in Waterloo, London. He lived in Wolverhampton and began his football career with local teams Bilston United and Rowley United before joining Wolverhampton Wanderers in 1906. He made no league appearances for the club before moving on to Birmingham, where he spent eighteen months and played only twice for the first team.

Transferred to Aston Villa in a part-exchange deal involving Jack Wilcox, he marked his debut in December 1908 with a hat-trick, but played only three more league games, leaving for Queens Park Rangers, then a Southern League club, at the end of the 1908–09 season. A year in London, during which he scored 7 goals from 34 appearances in the League (8 from 41 in all competitions), preceded six months with Leicester Fosse before a more long-lasting move, to Barnsley of the Second Division, in January 1911. At the Yorkshire club he became known by the nickname 'Paddy', possibly in reference to a Scottish player of that name who had a decade earlier rather than any personal Irish links.

Travers played in the 1912 FA Cup final, in which Barnsley beat West Bromwich Albion 1–0 in extra time in the replay, after the first game had ended goalless. The Manchester Guardian's report of the replay praised his shots at goal.

After three years at Barnsley he joined Manchester United, for whom he played 21 games, scoring four goals. After the war he joined Swindon Town, playing 34 games in their last season in the Southern League and scoring 14 goals, which made him the club's second-highest scorer for the season. Returning to the Football League, he spent a few months with Millwall of the newly formed Third Division and the remainder of the 1920–21 season with rivals Norwich City. He finished his league career in the 1921–22 season at Gillingham, then returned to non-League football with Nuneaton Town and Cradley St Luke's, finally calling time on his career with his first club, Bilston United, in May 1931 at the age of 42.

Travers died in Palmerston North, New Zealand, on 6 December 1943 at the age of 56.
