= John Wilcox (Master of Clare College, Cambridge) =

Master of Clare College from 1736 from 1762

John Wilcox, D.D. (1692-1762) was Master of Clare College from 1736 until his death.

Wilcox was educated at Clare College, Cambridge. He became Fellow in 1714. He was ordained a priest in the Church of England in 1716. He held livings at Madingley, Everton, Bedfordshire and Kensington. Wilcox was Vice-Chancellor of the University of Cambridge between 1736 and 1737, and 1751 to 1752.

He died on 16 September 1762.
