= M. P. Willcocks =

English teacher, writer, translator, lecturer and suffragist (1869–1952)

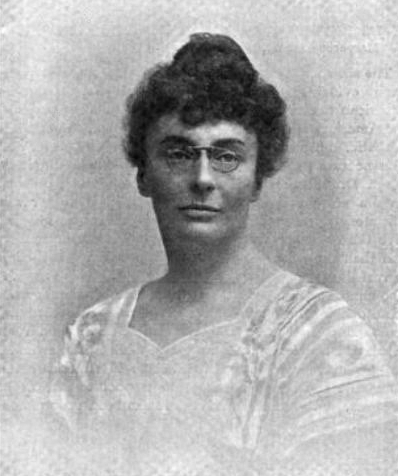
- Born: Mary Patricia Susan Willcocks; March 17, 1869; Ermington, Devon
- Died: November 22, 1952 (aged 83); Exeter, Devon
- Burial place: Higher Cemetery, Exeter
- Education: University of London
- Occupations: Teacher, writer, translator, lecturer, suffragist
- Movement: Suffrage

Mary Patricia Susan Willcocks (known as M. P. Willcocks; 17 March 1869 – 22 November 1952) was an English teacher, writer, translator, lecturer, and suffragist. During her lifetime, she was described as a "leading Devon novelist", and deserving of a place in the "front rank" of Britain's authors.

== Personal life ==
Mary Patricia Susan Willcocks was born near Ermington, Devon, on 17 March 1869, the daughter of John Willcocks and Sarah Hensleigh. Growing up on a farm, rural settings would influence many of her later works. She was taught to read by a miller's daughter, and attended Plymouth High School. She worked as a teacher in Edinburgh and Leamington Spa, continuing to teach until after the first two of her novels had been published.

In 1895, Willcocks obtained a first class BA from the University of London by correspondence through private study.

Moving there after the publication of her first novel in 1905, Willcocks spent much of her life living in Exeter, where she was friends with Frances Charlotte Slater (who wrote under the pseudonym Francis Bancroft) and another fellow novelist and poet Edith C. M. Dart. She also lectured for the Workers' Educational Association.

Willcocks was described by the Western Morning News as holding "decided and sometimes advanced views". Following World War I, hoping to help revive the once flourishing local serge industry, she set up a handloom and began weaving tweeds. She was also an active campaigner for women's suffrage, organising and speaking across Devon and Cornwall for the National Union of Women's Suffrage Societies, including the 1913 Votes for Women march from Land's End to Hyde Park. In 1911, she became Honorary Secretary of the newly-formed South West Federation of Suffrage Societies, but stepped down after one year.

Following the achievement of votes for women, she continued to campaign on women's rights issues, including in matters of employment.

== Writing ==
Between 1905 and 1936, Willcocks published sixteen volumes of fiction, translations of two novels by Anatole France, several biographies, and Between the Old World and the New: Being Studies in Literary Personality from Goethe and Balzac to Anatole France and Thomas Hardy (1925), described as "an interesting attempt to relate the history of imaginative literature to the progress of the human race which she sees as a consequence of evolution".

Willcocks's first novel, Widdicombe, was published in 1905. A Man of Genius: A Story of the Judgment of Paris (1908) was a rewriting of Thomas Hardy's Jude the Obscure (1895). Of this, The Telegraph wrote that Willcocks had "achieved a work more remarkable than its predecessors... something that should assure her place in the front rank of our living novelists".

Her best known novel during her lifetime was The Wingless Victory (1907), which was translated into several languages and allowed her to commit to writing full time.

Writer and publisher Bob Mann describes Willcocks' novels as mostly depicting:

strong, determined women struggling against weak, selfish men and a society that denies them basic rights, but they are never crudely simplistic or mere tracts about specific issues. She wrote at a time when the novel was seen as a vehicle for high moral purpose, and her situations bring out many subtleties of psychological insight.

In 1943 she was awarded a Civil List pension for services to literature. Her last book, written in her eighties, was a biography of François Rabelais, titled The Laughing Philosopher (1950).

== Death and legacy ==
Willcocks died in Exeter on 22 November 1952, aged 83, and was buried in the Higher Cemetery. The Western Morning News noted that though "physically frail" in later years, "her intellect remained keen and penetrating to the end".

In 2023, Exeter Civic Society erected a plaque for Willcocks at her former home, 88 Pennsylvania Road.

== Select bibliography ==
- Widdicombe (1905)
- Wingless Victory (1907)
- A Man of Genius: A Story of the Judgment of Paris (1908)
- The Way Up (1910)
- Wings of Desire (1912)
- The Sleeping Partner (1919)
- Between the Old World and the New: Being Studies in Literary Personality from Goethe and Balzac to Anatole France and Thomas Hardy (1925)
- The Laughing Philosopher (1950)
