= Bernard Lowe =

English footballer

Personal information
- Date of birth: 1885
- Place of birth: Cradley Heath, England
- Date of death: Unknown
- Position: Inside left

Senior career*
Years	Team	Apps	(Gls)
- Harborne Lynwood
- Halesowen
1908–1911	Birmingham	16	(3)
1911–1913	Darlaston		
1913–191?	Netherton		
- * Club domestic league appearances and goals

C. Bernard Lowe (1885 – after 1914) was an English professional footballer who played in the Football League for Birmingham.

Born in Cradley Heath, Staffordshire, Lowe played Birmingham League football for several years before joining Birmingham City in 1908. A skilful and creative inside forward, he made his debut in the Football League Second Division on 7 November 1908 in a 2–1 win at home to Barnsley. After 17 games in two and a half years, and being played out of his preferred position too often, he returned to non-league football with Darlaston and then with Netherton. Lowe retired from the game during the First World War.
