= Charles Wilcox =

Charles Wilcox may refer to:

- Charles Willcox, mayor of Adelaide
- Charles F. Wilcox (1845–1905), American architect
- Charles Henry Wilcox (1880–1920) Representative in the Territory of Hawaii legislature
- Charles S. Wilcox (1856–1938), first president of Iron and Steel Company of Canada, later called Stelco
- Charles Smith Wilcox (1852–1909), Nova Scotia politician

== See also ==
- Charlie Wilcox, a children's novel by Sharon E. McKay
