= Brad Wilcox =

Brad Wilcox may refer to:

- Bradley R. Wilcox (born 1959), American LDS educator and Counselor in the LDS Young Men's Presidency
- W. Bradford Wilcox (born 1970), American sociologist
