= Alex Watson (football manager) =

English football secretary-manager (1864–1931)

Alexander Watson (1864 – 12 July 1931) was secretary-manager of Birmingham Football Club from 1908 to 1911.

== Life and career ==
Alexander Watson was born in 1864 in Patterdale, Westmorland, to Scottish parents, John Watson, a lead miner, and his wife, Helen. By the time of the 1871 Census, the family had moved to Monkwearmouth Shore, in Sunderland, County Durham, where John Watson had worked in the coal mines.

Watson became a schoolteacher, a career he followed alongside his involvement with football. He was joint secretary of Sunderland A.F.C. from 1894 to 1900, and remained on the administrative staff thereafter. At the time of the McCombie benefit case in 1904, when courts and the Football Association ruled and overruled on whether the player Andy McCombie had to repay £100 lent him by the club to start up a business, Watson was financial secretary, and was one of eight Sunderland officials suspended from football for varying periods – in his case 18 months – over irregularities in the club's financial arrangements. The Sunderland Daily Echo's opinion was that the removal of Watson from involvement with local football in the area would be detrimental to those organisations with which he worked.

In 1908, Birmingham were relegated from the First Division of the Football League, and their long-serving secretary-manager, Alf Jones, retired. There were 135 applications for the vacancy, four candidates were interviewed, and Watson was appointed. The team finished bottom of the 1909–10 Second Division, and their application for re-election to the League was successful. Watson resigned as secretary-manager at the end of the next season, and the club decided to split the role: Bob McRoberts was appointed as team manager, with no secretarial duties, and Watson's former assistant, Frank Richards, took over as secretary.

Watson, who was married with a daughter, returned to Sunderland and resumed his teaching career, from which he retired towards the end of the 1920s. He had been a chorister at St Andrew's Church, Roker, since it was built in the 1900s, and was secretary of the parochial church council. On 12 July 1931, he was at the church preparing for the morning service when he collapsed and died.

== Notes ==
Published sources, including Tony Matthews' Birmingham City Complete Record books, give 1910 as the date of Watson's departure from Birmingham and McRoberts' arrival. However, the contemporary newspaper reports cited here, as well as the 1911 UK Census returns, in which Watson describes himself as "Secretary-Manager Football Club" and Richards describes himself as "Assistant Secretary Football Club", confirm 1911 as the correct year.
