= James Williams (Welsh footballer) =

Welsh footballer (1885–1916)

- Williams, circa 1910, possibly pictured in Crystal Palace colours of the time, claret and blue

Personal information
- Full name: James William Williams (Note: As a footballer, the player's first given name is generally recorded as James. However, confusion has arisen about his first name, and it seems possible that his birth was registered under the name John, hence that name appearing on his military service record. His name (including the signature) on his application form, which identifies his occupation as professional footballer, are both John.)
- Date of birth: 15 February 1885
- Place of birth: Buckley, Wales
- Date of death: 5 June 1916 (aged 31)
- Place of death: France
- Height: 5 ft 5 in (1.65 m)
- Position: Forward

Senior career*
| Years | Team | Apps | (Gls) |
| 1904–1907 | Bury | 15 | (7) |
| 1907–1908 | Accrington Stanley | | |
| 1908–1909 | Birmingham | 12 | (3) |
| 1909 | Accrington Stanley | | |
| 1909–1914 | Crystal Palace | 142 | (56) |
| 1914–1915 | Millwall | | |
| Total | | 169 | (66) |

International career
| 1912 | Wales | 2 | (0) |
- * Club domestic league appearances and goals

John William "James" Williams (15 February 1885 – 5 June 1916) was a Welsh professional footballer who won two caps for the Wales national football team and played in the Football League for Birmingham. He died on active service during the First World War.

== Playing career ==
=== Club career ===
Williams was born in Buckley, Flintshire, to coal miner William Williams and his wife, Elizabeth Williams. A prolific scorer in junior football, he played for Bury, though not in the Football League, and for Accrington Stanley before impressing on trial with Second Division club Birmingham. Williams signed for them in August 1908, and made his debut on 7 September 1908, playing at inside left in a 3–1 win at home to Bradford. He was given a decent run of games in the starting eleven, but failed to impress, and returned to Accrington Stanley in February 1909.

In the 1909 close season, he moved to Crystal Palace of the Southern League. With Palace his best position was centre forward or inside right, though he was capable of playing in any forward role. Described as "an eager, neat and busy little footballer who possessed a snappy tackle and plenty of enthusiasm and determination", he scored 58 goals from 149 appearances in all competitions, including scoring five in one match against Southend United in September 1909. Williams remained with the club for nearly five seasons, during which time he won two caps for Wales. In February 1914 he joined Millwall, also playing in the Southern League, and remained with the club for about a year.

=== International career ===
Williams made his international debut for Wales in the 1912 British Home Championship against Scotland national football team at Tynecastle on 2 March 1912. Wales lost 1–0. His second cap came in a 3–2 defeat at Ninian Park against Ireland in the same competition.

== Personal life ==
Williams was born in Buckley, Flintshire, and was married to Sarah. He had a son, Kenneth, born in August 1913. He enlisted in the 17th Battalion, Middlesex Regiment – the Footballers' Battalion – and served in northern France during the First World War. He transferred to the Royal Engineers and was killed in a mine explosion in June 1916. He is commemorated on the Arras Memorial and at Millwall F.C.'s ground. His death was widely reported, including in The New York Times.
