= David Wilcox =

David Wilcox may refer to:

== Music ==
- David Wilcox (Canadian musician) (born 1949), Canadian rock musician
- David Wilcox (American musician) (born 1958), American folk musician
- David Wilcox, member of English band Triple 8

== Others ==
- David Wilcox (D&H), president of the Delaware and Hudson Railway 1903–1907
- David Wilcox (screenwriter), television writer and producer
- David Wilcox (bishop) (1930–2025), British Anglican bishop
- Dave Wilcox (1942–2023), American football linebacker

== See also ==
- David Wilcock (1973–2026), American paranormal writer, media personality, and YouTuber
- Sir David Willcocks (1919–2015), British choral conductor, organist, and composer
