= Donald Wilcox =

American spree killer

- Born: Donald Carhart Wilcox; 1969
- Died: February 12, 2003 (aged 34); Corpus Christi, Texas, U.S.
- Cause of death: Self-inflicted gunshot wound
- Conviction: Sexual abuse of a minor
- Penalty: 2-to-5 years

Details
- Victims: 4+
- Span of crimes: February 5 – 12, 2003
- Country: United States
- State: Texas

Donald Carhart Wilcox (1969 – February 12, 2003) was an American spree killer. A convicted child molester, he killed at least four elderly people during a robbery spree around Corpus Christi, Texas, from February 5 to 12, 2003. Wilcox was eventually surrounded by officers at a hotel and shot himself in the head to avoid arrest, while a teenage accomplice who assisted him in the first two murders was convicted and sentenced to life imprisonment.

== Prior criminal history ==
Little is known about Wilcox's past. Born in 1969, he was described as a drifter and con man who traveled all across the country, living off burglaries and thefts for which he was repeatedly jailed. Prior to his murder spree, his most serious known conviction was for molesting a 6-year-old girl in New Castle, Pennsylvania in 1997, to which he pleaded guilty and received a 2-to-5 year sentence. Wilcox served out the majority of this sentence and was released in January 2003, but instead of returning to his previous known address in Winchester, Virginia, he decided to board a bus in New York City and travel to a random location. During this trip, he befriended another drifter, Harry Mavoides, and through him also befriended his 15-year-old son, Mitchell.

== Murders and suicide ==
On the evening of February 5, 2003, Wilcox was at a convenience store in Corpus Christi when he stumbled upon Mitchell Mavoides, who had gone there to buy cigarettes. Knowing that the teenager was desperate to return home to New York City, he proposed that they team up and rob an elderly couple living in an isolated home in nearby Portland, to which Mavoides agreed. They then traveled to the home and waited for the two residents - 79-year-old Weldon and 77-year-old Charlotte Parker - to come home from church. When they arrived, Wilcox threatened them with a .45 caliber handgun he had found in their house and threatened them at gunpoint, forcing the pair into the trunk of their car. He and Mavoides then got in and drove around town for some time before arriving at an isolated area north of Corpus Christi. Wilcox then forced the elderly couple out of the trunk and shot both in the head, two times each.

On February 10, Wilcox broke into the home of 61-year-old Louis Victor Mokry, where he lived alone. After shooting the man in the head, he stole whatever valuables he could find and left. Mokry's body was discovered later that day after he failed to appear at his workplace, but authorities were initially unable to determine whether the case was a suicide or homicide. On the following day, police officers searching for the Parkers found their bodies, and when they conducted forensic ballistics tests, they linked the bullets found inside their bodies to Mokry. That same day, acting on an anonymous tip, authorities arrested Mavoides and issued a warrant for first-degree capital murder for Wilcox.

On midnight of February 12, police officers in Corpus Christi received information that Wilcox was residing at the Padre Motel in the Flour Bluff neighborhood, and after two hours of surveillance, a SWAT team was dispatched to arrest him. However, Wilcox exited his room brandishing a handgun and pointed it at them, whereupon the officers opened fire, striking him multiple times. He then lifted the gun to his head and shot himself in the face, resulting in an instant death. While it was initially questioned whether his death was the result of a shot fired by him or the SWAT unit, an autopsy determined the cause of death to be a self-inflicted gunshot wound.

== Aftermath ==
Immediately after his death, his motel room and a white Ford Taurus, presumed to be stolen, were searched. Upon opening the trunk of the car, officers discovered the body of 87-year-old Luther Butler, an Oklahoma native and the car's owner who had evidently been murdered by Wilcox, but it remains unclear at what date this occurred. The discovery of his body led some authorities to speculate that Wilcox might have been responsible for other murders, possibly in other states, but to date no further crimes have been linked to him.

For his role in the Parker double murder, Mitchell Mavoides was tried as an adult, found guilty and sentenced to life imprisonment with a chance of parole. His earliest possible release is scheduled for 2046, when he would be 59 years old.
