= Cornelis DeWitt Willcox =

American army officer and scholar

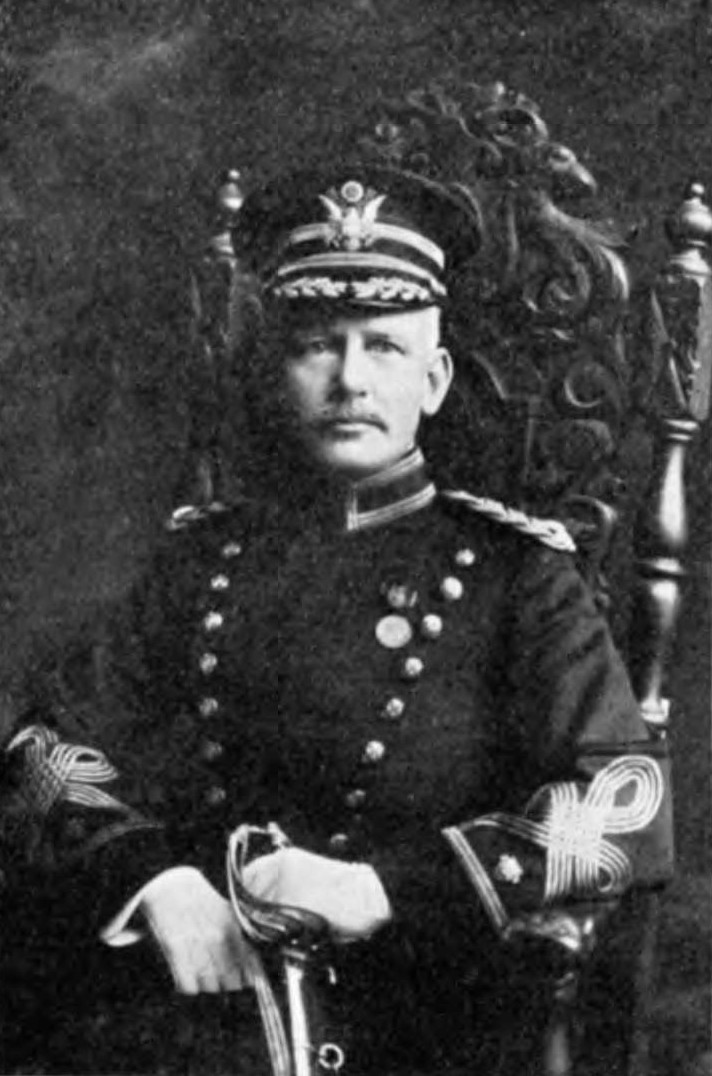
- Born: 1861; Geneva, Switzerland
- Died: January 18, 1938 (aged 76–77); Naples, Italy
- Education: University of Georgia
- Military career
- Allegiance: American
- Branch: Army
- Rank: Colonel
- Conflicts: Santiago campaign
- Other work: Scholar

Cornélis DeWitt Willcox (1861–1938) was an American army officer and scholar, born at Geneva, Switzerland. He graduated from the University of Georgia in 1880, from the United States Military Academy (1885), and Artillery School (1892), and in 1913 studied at the University of Grenoble.

He served in the Santiago campaign in 1898, at Manila from 1908–1910, and at West Point as professor of modern languages. He was promoted colonel in 1914. At the outbreak of World War I in August 1914 he was in Spain and rendered valuable assistance to the U.S. diplomatic service by helping Americans stranded by war to relocate to the United States.

In 1918 he was elected as an honorary member of the Georgia Society of the Cincinnati.

He died in Naples, Italy on January 18, 1938.

== Publications ==
He published:

- A French-English Military Technical Dictionary (1900; new edition, 1910)
- The Head Hunters of Northern Luzon (1912)
- A Reader of Scientific and Technical Spanish (1913)
- "War French" (1918)

Colonel Willcox and General John Wilson Ruckman helped to found the Journal of the United States Artillery (1892), and in 1915 became an editor of the International Military Digest.
