= Justin Wilcox =

Justin Wilcox may refer to:

- Justin Wilcox (American football) (born 1976), an American college football coach
- Justin Wilcox (martial arts) (born 1979), an American mixed martial artist
