= Willcox =

Willcox may refer to:

- Willcox, Arizona, a city in the United States
- Willcox AVA, an American Viticultural Area in Arizona
- Willcox (surname), people with the surname Willcox

== See also ==
- Wilcox (surname)
- Wilcox (disambiguation)
- Willcocks
