= Adam Wilcox =

Adam Wilcox may refer to:

- Adam Wilcox (racing driver) (born 1976), British racing driver
- Adam Wilcox (ice hockey) (born 1992), American ice hockey player
