= Frederick Chapple =

English footballer

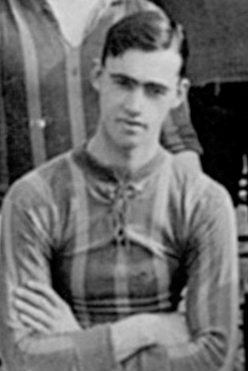
- Chapple while with Brentford in 1912.

Personal information
- Full name: Frederick John Chapple
- Date of birth: 3 February 1884
- Place of birth: Eastville, England
- Date of death: 1965 (aged 80–81)
- Place of death: Bristol, England
- Height: 5 ft 10 1/2 in (1.79 m)
- Positions: Forward; left half

Youth career
- Eastville Commercial School
- Blaina
- Ebbw Vale
- Treharris Boys Club

Senior career*
Years	Team	Apps	(Gls)
1906–1908	Aston Villa	9	(3)
1908–1910	Birmingham	50	(15)
1910–1912	Crewe Alexandra		
1912–1913	Brentford	28	(11)
1913–1918	Bristol City	20	(10)
1918–1920	Blyth Spartans		
- Douglas Motors
- * Club domestic league appearances and goals

Frederick John Chapple (3 February 1884 – 1965) was an English professional footballer who played as an inside forward in the Football League for Aston Villa, Birmingham and Bristol City and in non-league football for Crewe Alexandra, Brentford and Blyth Spartans. He was Birmingham's top scorer in 1908–09, despite only joining the club halfway through the season.

== Career statistics ==
Appearances and goals by club, season and competition
Club	Season	League			FA Cup		Total	
Club	Season	Division	Apps	Goals	Apps	Goals	Apps	Goals
Aston Villa	1906–07	First Division	8	3	0	0	8	3
Aston Villa	1907–08	First Division	1	0	0	0	1	0
Aston Villa	Total		9	3	0	0	9	3
Birmingham	1908–09	Second Division	19	7	1	1	20	8
Birmingham	1909–10	Second Division	31	8	1	0	32	8
Birmingham	Total		50	15	2	1	52	16
Brentford	1912–13	Southern League First Division	28	11	2	0	30	11
Bristol City	1914–15	Second Division	4	1	1	0	5	1
Career total			91	30	5	1	96	31
