= Robert Wilcox =

Robert Wilcox or Wilcock may refer to:

- Robert Wilcox (actor) (1910–1955), American film actor
- Robert William Wilcox (1855–1903), Native Hawaiian revolutionary
- Robert Wilcox (martyr), English martyr
- Robert Wilcock, MP for New Romney (UK Parliament constituency)
