= Freya Wilcox =

Australian-born singer, songwriter

- Born: Freya Lynelle Wilcox; Queensland, Australia
- Origin: Brooklyn, New York, United States
- Genres: Indie; punk; rock; roots
- Occupation: Musician
- Instruments: Vocals; guitar
- Years active: 2008–present
- Formerly of: Freya Wilcox & the Howl
- Website: freyawilcox.com

Freya Lynelle Wilcox is an Australian-born singer, songwriter and guitarist. She formed Freya Wilcox and the Howl in the United States with CJ Dunaieff on drums and Craig Shay on bass guitar.

== Biography ==
Freya Lynelle Wilcox was born in Queensland and grew up on the Gold Coast She started playing guitar at the age of ten. She studied Mass Communication and Media Studies at Queensland University of Technology, Brisbane. Wilcox moved to the United States in her early 20s. She has been vocally compared to Joan Jett and Brody Dalle, and is best known for her gutsy vocals and live performances.

Wilcox released a solo extended play, Dirt Music. She followed with another EP, Bareknuckle Love with her group the Howl and a split single that includes their punk cover version of the Fleetwood Mac's "Rhiannon"
