= William Jenkins Wilcox Jr. =

American chemist and historian

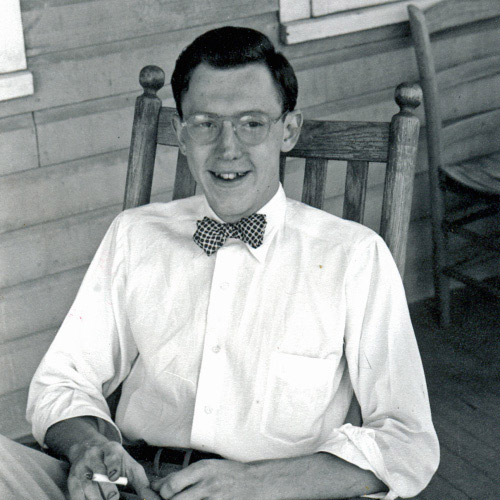
- Portrait, 1944
- Born: January 26, 1923; Harrisburg, Pennsylvania, US
- Died: September 2, 2013 (aged 90); Oak Ridge, Tennessee, US
- Education: Washington and Lee University; University of Tennessee
- Known for: History of the Y-12 National Security Complex
- Scientific career
- Fields: Chemistry
- Workplaces: Tennessee Eastman; Union Carbide

William Jenkins Wilcox Jr. (January 26, 1923 – September 2, 2013) was an American chemist and nuclear weapons historian. During World War II he worked on the Manhattan Project at the Clinton Engineer Works. After the war, he headed the research and development work there as the technical director of Union Carbide's Nuclear Division at the K-25 and Y-12 plants. He became the honorary Oak Ridge City historian and headed the effort to gather oral history accounts of the Manhattan Project.

== Biography ==
William Jenkins Wilcox Jr. was born in Harrisburg, Pennsylvania, on January 26, 1923, the son of William J. Wilcox Sr., an attorney, and his wife Kitty née Rogers. Wilcox grew up in Allentown, Pennsylvania, where he graduated from Allentown High School. He then entered Washington and Lee University, where he majored in chemistry and graduated with honors in 1943.

In May 1943, Wilcox joined the Manhattan Project, working for Tennessee Eastman in Rochester, New York, on uranium purification processes. In October of that year he went to the Clinton Engineer Works in Oak Ridge, Tennessee, where he led the Beta chemistry group at the Y-12 plant, although as a chemist he never saw the calutrons there that performed the uranium enrichment until after the war. In February 1944, he was the chemist who prepared the first shipment of highly enriched uranium. He met Eugenia "Jeanie" Holder, who worked in the security department at Oak Ridge, and they were married in 1946. They had three children: Kitty Ellen, William Holder, and Martha Minor.

After the war, he remained in Oak Ridge, where he worked in the Analytical Chemistry Division at Y-12 and established a statistical quality control program. He was successively a research chemist, technical assistant, physics department head, and division director for gaseous diffusion and gas centrifuge at K-25. He was the technical director of Union Carbides Nuclear Division for twelve years, during which he headed the research and development efforts at both the K-25 and Y-12 plants. In 1958, he graduated from the University of Tennessee with a master's degree in industrial management.

In 1980, while in Switzerland, Wilcox had a heart attack. Afterwards, he became technical assistant to successive presidents of Union Carbide, Roger F. Hibbs, Ken Jarmolow, and Clyde C. Hopkins. In 1983, he was in charge of the Mercury Task Force that investigated how the use of mercury for lithium isotope separation at Oak Ridge between 1955 and 1962 had impacted the health of workers and the environment. He retired in 1986.

In retirement, Wilcox wrote and lectured on the history of the Y-12 and K-25 plants. He created a Secret City Commemorative walk through Oak Ridge to tell the story of the city through commemorative plaques and markers, and he personally led tours of historic sites. He compiled an unclassified history titled "An Overview of the History of Y-12: 1942-1992", which the American Museum of Science and Energy published in 2001. He assisted a documentary on the Manhattan Project on the History Channel that formed part of its "Modern Marvels" series. The Oak Ridge City Council acknowledged him with the honorary title of "Oak Ridge City Historian" in 2006. He spearheaded the effort to gather oral history accounts of the Manhattan Project while participants were still living. These were deposited in the Oak Ridge Public Library. In September 2012, he attended a National Archives of Atlanta symposium titled "Secret City in the Tennessee Hills: From Dogpatch to Nuclear Power", at which he received a Citizen Archivist award.

Wilcox died at NHC Healthcare of Oak Ridge on September 2, 2013.
