= William Wilcox (footballer) =

English footballer

Personal information
- Position: Forward

Youth career
- Ancoats Lads Club

Senior career*
Years	Team	Apps	(Gls)
- Walkden Central
1919–1920	Hurst		
1921–1922	Macclesfield	15	(10)
1922–192?	Congleton Town		
1923	Crewe Alexandra	1	(0)
1923–192?	Chester		
1924–1925	Hurst		
- * Club domestic league appearances and goals

William A. Wilcox (active 1910s–1925) was an English footballer who played as a forward in the Football League for Crewe Alexandra. He also played non-league football in the Manchester and Cheshire area for clubs including Hurst, Macclesfield, for which he was top scorer in 1921–22 despite leaving the club in mid-season, Congleton Town and Chester.

During the First World War, Wilcox served with the Royal Flying Corps and played football for Manchester United and Chorley in the wartime competitions.
