= Wilcox Township, Hancock County, Illinois =

Wilcox Township
- Township
- Location in Hancock County

- Hancock County's location in Illinois
- Coordinates: 40°19′13″N 91°25′19″W
- Country: United States
- State: Illinois
- County: Hancock
- Established: November 15, 1855

Area
  - Total: 21.04 sq mi (54.5 km^{2})
  - Land: 20.12 sq mi (52.1 km^{2})
  - Water: 0.92 sq mi (2.4 km^{2}) 4.37%
- Elevation: 620 ft (189 m)

Population (2010)
  - Estimate (2016): 184
  - Density: 9.4/sq mi (3.6/km^{2})
- Time zone: UTC-6 (CST)
  - Summer (DST): UTC-5 (CDT)
- ZIP codes: 62373, 62379
- FIPS code: 17-067-81607

Wilcox Township was a township in Hancock County, Illinois, USA. As of the 2010 census, its population was 189 and it contained 82 housing units. It was formed from the rural portion of Warsaw Township on November 15, 1855, when that township became co-extensive with the city of Warsaw. In November 2016, the township voted to merge with Rocky Run Township due to low population. It is now part of Rocky Run-Wilcox Township.

== Geography ==
According to the 2010 census, the township has a total area of 21.04 square miles (54.5 km^{2}), of which 20.12 square miles (52.1 km^{2}) (or 95.63%) is land and 0.92 square miles (2.4 km^{2}) (or 4.37%) is water.

=== Cemeteries ===
The township contains Green Plains Cemetery.

=== Major highways ===
- Illinois Route 96

=== Airports and landing strips ===
- Warsaw Airport

Historical population
Census	Pop.	Note	%±
2016 (est.)	184
U.S. Decennial Census

== School districts ==
- Hamilton Community Consolidated School District 328
- Warsaw Community Unit School District 316

== Political districts ==
- Illinois's 17th congressional district
- State House District 94
- State Senate District 47
