= Roy Wilcox =

Roy Wilcox may refer to:

- Roy P. Wilcox (1873–1946), member of the Wisconsin State Senate
- Roy C. Wilcox (1891–1975), Lieutenant Governor of Connecticut
