= Trevor Bailey =

England cricketer, sportswriter and broadcaster

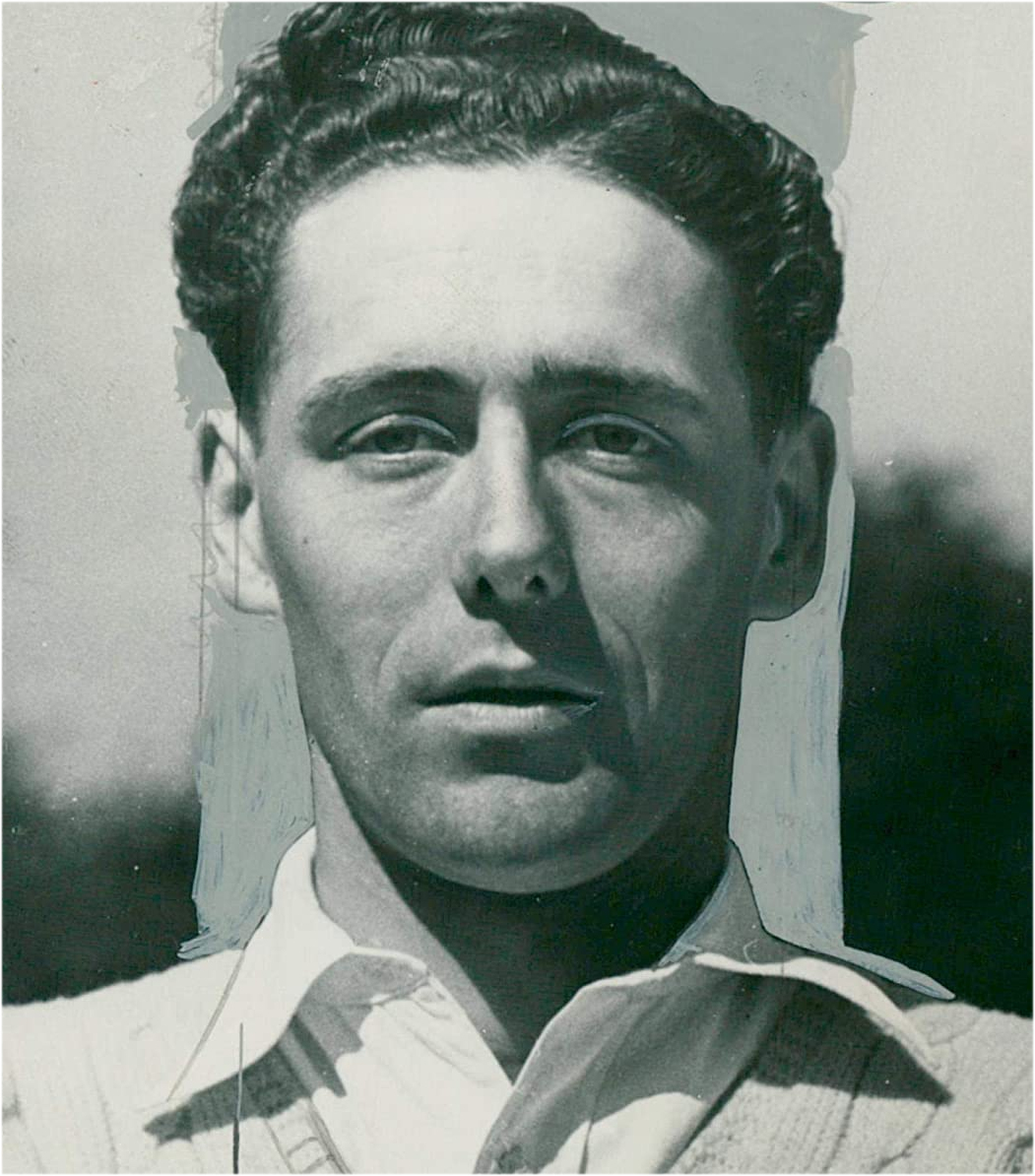

Personal information
- Full name: Trevor Edward Bailey
- Born: 3 December 1923; Westcliff-on-Sea, Essex, England
- Died: 10 February 2011 (aged 87); Westcliff-on-Sea, Essex, England
- Nickname: Barnacle, The Boil
- Batting: Right-handed
- Bowling: Right-arm fast-medium
- Role: All-rounder

International information
- National side: England
- Test debut (cap 342): 11 June 1949 v New Zealand
- Last Test: 13 February 1959 v Australia

Domestic team information
- Years: Team
- 1946–1967: Essex
- 1947–1948: Cambridge University
- 1949–1964: Marylebone Cricket Club

Career statistics
Competition	Test	FC	LA
Matches	61	682	7
Runs scored	2,290	28,641	93
Batting average	29.74	33.42	15.50
100s/50s	1/10	28/150	0/0
Top score	134*	205	38
Balls bowled	9,712	116,665	504
Wickets	132	2,082	11
Bowling average	29.21	23.13	26.36
5 wickets in innings	5	110	0
10 wickets in match	1	13	0
Best bowling	7/34	10/90	4/37
Catches/stumpings	32/–	426/–	3/–
- Source: CricketArchive, 14 December 2008

Trevor Edward Bailey CBE (3 December 1923 – 10 February 2011) was an England Test cricketer, cricket writer and broadcaster.

An all-rounder, Bailey was known for his skilful but unspectacular batting. As the BBC reflected in his obituary: "His stubborn refusal to be out normally brought more pleasure to the team than to the spectators." This defensive style of play brought him the first of his nicknames, "Barnacle Bailey", but he was a good enough cricketer to be judged retrospectively as the leading all-rounder in the world for most of his international career.

In later life, Bailey wrote a number of books and commentated on the game. He was particularly known for the 26 years he spent working for the BBC on the Test Match Special radio programme.

== Early life ==
Bailey was born in Westcliff-on-Sea, Essex. His father was a civil servant in the Admiralty. Bailey grew up in modest affluence: "The family lived in [a] semi-detached house at Leigh-on-Sea, complete with a live-in maid on 12 shillings (60p) a week; they did not, however, own a car." He first learned to play cricket on the beach.

He won sporting scholarships to attend Alleyn Court Prep School, where he learned cricket from former Essex captain Denys Wilcox, and then Dulwich College. In his first year, aged just 14, he was selected for Dulwich's First XI cricket team. He came top of the school's batting and bowling averages in 1939 and 1940, became captain in 1941, and was top of the averages again in his last year at Dulwich, 1942. He had played as a junior for Westcliff-on-Sea Cricket Club and made his debut for their first team in 1939, aged 15, scoring 135 and taking one wicket against Old Felstedians.

He was commissioned as a second lieutenant in the Royal Marines after leaving school; he won some reputation as defending counsel in courts-martial. Though World War II was still in progress, he received an early discharge in January 1945 to return to Alleyn Court Prep School as a schoolmaster. He subsequently attended St John's College, Cambridge, for two years, reading English and History and graduating in 1948. He won blues for both cricket and football both years, 1947 and 1948. The Cambridge football team included Doug Insole, whom Bailey would later succeed as captain of Essex County Cricket Club.

== Career ==
=== Cricket ===
Bailey made his first-class cricket debut in September 1945, aged 22, for the "Under 33s" scratch team, in a match at Lord's, against an "Over 33s" team, and made his debut playing county cricket for Essex in May 1946. He quickly became a lynchpin of the Essex team, and made his Test debut for England against New Zealand at Headingley in June 1949, taking 6 wickets for 118 runs in his first match.

A right-arm fast-medium bowler, dependable right-handed batsman and strong fielder, often in the slips or at leg gully, Bailey played 61 Tests for England between 1949 and 1959. His swing bowling provided an effective foil for the fast bowling of Alec Bedser, and later Fred Trueman, Brian Statham and Frank Tyson. He is described as having had "a model high, sideways-on action which encouraged outswing. At his best he could touch greatness..." He took 132 wickets at the bowling average of 29, scored a century (134 not out) in attaining a useful batting average of nearly 30, and took 32 catches.

He is best remembered for his obdurate defensive batting, especially in matches against Australia. England were facing defeat by the Australians at Lord's in the Second Test in 1953. Bailey shared a defensive fifth wicket stand with Willie Watson, defying the bowlers for over four hours to earn a draw, taking 257 minutes to score 71 runs. In the fourth Test of that series, at Headingley, Bailey again played an important part in ensuring that England avoided going 1–0 down, which would have ended their hopes of regaining the Ashes. When the last day began England were 177–5 in their second innings, only 78 runs ahead. Bailey scored 38 in 262 minutes, and Australia eventually had to score 177 in only 115 minutes. They reached a point where they needed only another 66 in 45 minutes with seven wickets left. But Bailey went back to his long run and slowed the over rate, as well as bowling negatively wide of the leg stump, and Australia fell 30 runs short and the game was drawn. England went on to win the fifth and final Test and so regained the Ashes.

His best Test bowling figures of 7/34, bowling outswing on a flat pitch, enabled England to bowl out the West Indies for 139 in the first innings of the fifth Test at Kingston, Jamaica, in 1953–54, on a pitch on which the groundsman expected the home side to score 700. This enabled England to win the match and to share the series 2–2. He was vice-captain on that tour, and may be considered unlucky never to have been appointed captain of England. According to Alan Gibson: "It is astonishing that so good a cricketer, so thoughtful a judge, and so friendly a man, should have been passed over." However, he adds: "He is, or was in his earlier days, a man of contradictions, who sometimes enjoyed being irritating, to his captain, to his colleagues, to the public, but most of all to his opponents."

He played his final Tests in the Ashes tour to Australia in 1958–59. He had a bad tour, during which he scored the slowest half-century in first-class cricket, reaching 50 just three minutes short of six hours at the crease, in England's second innings during the 1st Test at Brisbane. This was the first Test match to be broadcast on television in Australia. He bagged a pair in his final test, the last of the tour at Melbourne, He was never selected for England's Test side again, but continued to play first-class cricket for Essex for another eight years, and in the 1959 season became the only player since the Second World War to score more than 2,000 runs and take 100 wickets in a single domestic season.

His first-class cricket career began just after World War II in 1946 and lasted 21 years as he played 682 matches, taking 2,082 wickets at a bowling average of 23.13, which puts him 25th on the all-time list of wicket-takers. Bailey achieved the rare feat of taking all 10 wickets in an innings, for 90 runs, against Lancashire at Clacton in 1949. His 28,641 runs in first-class cricket put him 67th on the all-time list of run-scorers. He captained the county from 1961 to 1966. He was also the county's secretary (i.e. the chief administrative officer) from 1964 to 1969, having previously had a spell as assistant secretary. He arranged for Warwickshire to make an interest-free loan to Essex in 1965 which allowed Essex to buy its Chelmsford ground. His administrative roles enabled him to receive a salary whilst at the same time technically remaining an amateur cricketer prior to the abolition of the distinction between amateurs and professionals following the 1962 season, although he was better paid than the club's professionals. However, Keith Fletcher, a playing colleague at Essex, did not begrudge him his salary, saying: "... he was a better cricketer than the pros and someone instrumental in taking Essex County Cricket Club into the modern era. He was cricket and Essex, through and through.". He supplemented his income by undertaking advertising work while playing for Essex, modelling for Brylcreem, Shredded Wheat and Lucozade.

Limited overs cricket began in 1963, late in Bailey's career. He played seven List A matches, all for Essex in the Gillette Cup competition between 1963 and 1967. In those games he scored 93 runs at an average of 15.50 and took 11 wickets at an average of 26.36.

=== Football ===
He played football for Cambridge University (appearing in the University Match against Oxford), Southend United reserves, Clapton, Leytonstone and Walthamstow Avenue. At various times he played at centre-half, inside-right and on the wing. He was a member of the Walthamstow Avenue side which won the FA Amateur Cup in 1951–2, winning the final before a Wembley crowd of 100,000. The following season, he played in the side which reached the fourth round of the FA Cup. Drawn against Manchester United at Old Trafford, they drew 1–1, a fine achievement for an amateur side. The replay took place at Highbury, and Manchester United won 5–2. He later became a director of Southend United F.C.

== Writer and broadcaster ==
After retiring from cricket in 1967, Bailey continued to play for Westcliff-on-Sea Cricket Club for many years and also became a cricket journalist and broadcaster. He was the cricket and football correspondent of the Financial Times for 23 years. He was a regular on the BBC's Test Match Special from 1974 to 1999, where fellow commentator Brian Johnston nicknamed him The Boil, based on the supposed Australian barrackers' pronunciation of his name as "Boiley". (The Daily Telegraph gives an alternative source for this nickname from the pronunciation of his surname by the East End supporters of the Walthamstow Avenue football team.) During his retirement he would watch Westcliff-on-Sea Cricket Club play at their Chalkwell Park Ground where he had played many times for school, club and county.

He was appointed a Commander of the Order of the British Empire in the 1994 Birthday Honours for services to cricket. He was given the Freedom of the Borough of Southend-on-Sea in 2000.

== Legacy ==
He remains the only player since the Second World War to score more than 2,000 runs in a season and take 100 wickets, a feat he achieved in 1959, and he achieved the all-rounders' double of 1,000 runs and 100 wickets in a season eight times, a post-World War II record he shares with Fred Titmus. He was selected as one of the five Wisden Cricketers of the Year in 1950. He is also one of three players (the others are Fred Titmus and Ray Illingworth) to have scored 20,000 first-class runs and taken 2,000 wickets since the Second World War. According to the retrospectively calculated ICC cricket ratings, for most of his career, Bailey was the best all-rounder in the world. In the individual disciplines, his bowling saw him achieve the higher ranking, as high as eighth in the summer of 1957.

Doug Insole, his one-time captain at Essex, described him thus: "Trevor was quite a stroppy lad in his early cricketing years, and a bit of a rebel. He was a very intense character – we used to tease him about that in the dressing room, and he did mellow over the years."

Simon Briggs wrote: "There was little comfy or cosy about his cricket career. Rather, he fitted into a long tradition of hard-nosed English pragmatists – a lineage that runs from W. G. Grace, through Jardine and up to Nasser Hussain... To Bailey and company, the best way to honour the gods of cricket was to commit your heart and soul to the fight. For them, a Test match was a contest between two groups of warriors. Its entertainment value was almost irrelevant." In their history of Essex County Cricket Club, David Lemmon and Mike Marshall described Bailey as "the outstanding Essex player for two decades...his value to the Essex side was immense, not only as a cricketer but as a tactician and captain", and assessed him as "one of the most outstanding players in Essex history".

He was renowned for his slow scoring in Tests against Australia, Neville Cardus writing of one innings in his book Full Score (1970, chapter "Cricket of Vintage"): "Before he gathered together 20 runs, a newly-married couple could have left Heathrow and arrived in Lisbon, there to enjoy a honeymoon. By the time Bailey had congealed 50, this happily wedded pair could easily have settled down in a semi-detached house in Surbiton; and by the time his innings had gone to its close they conceivably might have been divorced." He was nicknamed "Barnacle" for his implacable defensive batting.

In Cardus's piece on him in Close of Play, first published in 1956, he was more complimentary: "Some cricketers are born to greatness. Bailey achieved it... He conquers by tremendous effort... Yet Bailey... loves to attack any bowler... He has made catches bordering on the marvellous... It is no small thing to be a Trevor Bailey in a world of anonymous mediocrity."

Bailey died in a fire in his retirement flat in Westcliff-on-Sea on 10 February 2011. His wife, Greta, survived. They had two sons and one daughter.

The chairman of the England and Wales Cricket Board, Giles Clarke, described him as "one of the finest all-rounders this country has ever produced", while Jonathan Agnew, who worked with Bailey on Test Match Special, wrote of him: "dogged batsman, aggressive bowler. Intelligent cricketer. Wonderfully concise pundit. Great sense of humour."

== Bibliography ==
He wrote the following books:

- Cricketers in the Making, with Denys Wilcox, Hutchinson
- Playing to Win, Hutchinson, 1954 – an account of the 1953 Test series in which England regained the Ashes which had been held by Australia since 1934
- Trevor Bailey's Cricket Book, Muller, 1959
- Championship Cricket, Muller, 1961
- Improve Your Cricket, Penguin, 1963
- The Greatest of My Time, Sportsmans, 1970
- Sir Gary: Life of Sir Garfield Sobers, Collins, 1976, ISBN 978-0-00-216764-2
- History of Cricket, Allen & Unwin, 1979, ISBN 978-0-04-796049-9
- Lord's Taverners' Fifty Greatest, 1945–83, Heinemann, 1983, ISBN 978-0-434-98039-0
- From Larwood to Lillee, with Fred Trueman, Macdonald, 1984, ISBN 978-0-356-10412-6
- Wickets, Catches and the Odd Run (autobiography), Willow Books, 1986, ISBN 0-00-218127-4
- Spinners' Web, with Fred Trueman, Willow Books, 1988, ISBN 978-0-00-218267-6

Alan Hill has written a biography:

- Alan Hill, The Valiant Cricketer: The Biography of Trevor Bailey, Pitch Publishing Ltd, 2012, ISBN 978-1908051868
