= Tom Daykin =

English footballer (1882–1960)

Personal information
- Full name: Thomas Daykin
- Date of birth: 30 July 1882
- Place of birth: Shildon, England
- Date of death: 20 July 1960 (aged 77)
- Place of death: Bishop Auckland, England
- Height: 5 ft 10 in (1.78 m)
- Positions: Full back; wing half

Senior career*
Years	Team	Apps	(Gls)
- Eldon Albion
- Bishop Auckland
- Hobson Wanderers
- Shildon Athletic
1905–1908	Sunderland	46	(0)
1908–1912	Birmingham	88	(1)
1912–1913	Spennymoor United		
1913–191?	South Shields		
- * Club domestic league appearances and goals

Thomas Daykin (30 July 1882 – 20 July 1960) was an English professional footballer who played in the Football League as a full back or wing half. He made 46 appearances in the First Division for Sunderland between 1905 and 1908, the last of which came in a 9–1 win against Newcastle United that remains the club's record league away win. He then joined Birmingham, for which he made 88 Second Division over three-and-a-half seasons. Daykin also played non-League football for clubs in his native north east of England.

== Life and career ==
Daykin was born in Shildon, County Durham, in 1882, one of many children of Thomas Daykin, a coal miner, and his wife, Lucy. By the time of the 1891 Census, the family had moved to nearby Eldon, and ten years later the 18-year-old Daykin had followed his father into the colliery. He married Ann Ellen Green on 30 April 1907 at Auckland St Andrew.

By January 1900, Daykin was playing football for his local team, Eldon Albion. He was a member of the team that put up a "splendid display" in the final of the 1903 Durham Senior Cup, taking a two-goal lead against cup-holders Sunderland "A" before "eventually class told" and Eldon lost 3–2. A trial with Newcastle United came to nothing, and Daykin also appeared for Bishop Auckland and Hobson Wanderers, before playing for Shildon Athletic of the Northern League in 1904–05.

Daykin joined Football League First Division club Sunderland in March 1905 on amateur forms until the end of the season, at which point he was expected to turn professional. With Jimmy Watson absent on international duty, Daykin made his debut on 1 April playing at left back at home to Manchester City. The match finished goalless, and the Athletic News' correspondent wrote how he "tackles well and with good judgment, and kicks splendidly in any position, his only weakness being his heading", and "bids fair to develop into a really good full-back." He played once more in what remained of the season, and returned to the side in late September. In his second match, he injured a knee, was confined to bed for some weeks, and was then referred to a Manchester hospital for further treatment. He played no more first-team football that season, but was fit enough by March to be on the winning side for the "A" team against Hebburn Argyle in the 1906 Durham Senior Cup Final, and his services were retained for another year.

Daykin finally established himself in Sunderland's first team halfway through the 1906–07 season. He came into the side for a visit to Woolwich Arsenal in early December when Watson was rested, and "played excellently" in a 1–0 win; the Athletic News noted that "even when beaten, he made some remarkable recoveries." He recovered from influenza just in time to stand in for Watson when he fell ill with the same complaint at the end of January, and missed only two more league matches that season, playing either alongside Watson or in his place. Daykin began the 1907–08 season as first choice at left back, partnering new signing Bob Bonthron, but other players were tried in mid-season. He came back into the side in March, but this time lost his place through injury. He was retained for 1908–09, and played in the opening fixture, but was dropped in favour of Tommy Tait, and made just three more appearances for Sunderland before moving on. His last match was the local derby against Newcastle United in December 1908. Sunderland took an early lead before the visitors equalised with a penalty just before half-time. Sunderland regained the lead two minutes into the second half, and in the next half hour scored seven more goals to make the final score 9–1; it remains the club record league away win.

A few days later, Daykin signed for Second Division club Birmingham. The clubs had agreed terms some weeks before, but the player had reportedly been reluctant to move. The Daily News described the new arrival as "Speedy and tenacious, he has the reputation of being one of the most useful and versatile men in the North. He has usually appeared in the intermediate line, where his abilities as a two-footed player make him useful in either position, but when occasion has demanded he has been a general utility man, both forward and at back." He played regularly at left half until injury forced him to miss five matches towards the end of the season. He remained first choice at left half until early 1910, when he was tried at right back because of several injuries in that position. During his second match at full back, he broke a leg and would be out for the rest of the season. The only fit senior full back, Walter Corbett, who had been in dispute with the club, offered his services after Daykin's injury, but he was unable to play in the next match because the Football Association turned down his request to withdraw from the amateur international on the same day.

Birmingham finished bottom of the Second Division, applied successfully for re-election to the League, and, after a season in which the players pledged wages to an appeal to keep the struggling club afloat, it underwent a complete overhaul both on and off the field. Daykin survived the clearout, and made more appearances than any other player over Birmingham's 1910–11 season, used half the time at right back and the remainder in the half-back line. When Daykin started making mistakes in the middle of the 1911–12 season, Billy Ball was able to establish himself in the side at right back, and Daykin made his final first-team appearance on 22 January 1912 in a 3–0 defeat at home to Barnsley in the FA Cup. He returned to non-League football in the north east, first with Spennymoor United and then, from February 1913, with South Shields.

The 1939 Register finds Daykin living with his wife in Mary Terrace, Bishop Auckland, and working for the local council as a general labourer. They were still resident at that address when he died in Tindale Crescent Hospital, Bishop Auckland, in 1960 at the age of 77.

== Career statistics ==
Appearances and goals by club, season and competition
Club	Season	League			FA Cup		Total	
Club	Season	Division	Apps	Goals	Apps	Goals	Apps	Goals
Sunderland	1904–05	First Division	2	0	0	0	2	0
Sunderland	1905–06	First Division	2	0	0	0	2	0
Sunderland	1906–07	First Division	17	0	2	0	19	0
Sunderland	1907–08	First Division	21	0	0	0	21	0
Sunderland	1908–09	First Division	4	0	0	0	4	0
Sunderland	Total		46	0	2	0	48	0
Birmingham	1908–09	Second Division	17	1	1	0	18	1
Birmingham	1909–10	Second Division	23	0	1	0	24	0
Birmingham	1910–11	Second Division	35	0	2	0	37	0
Birmingham	1910–11	Second Division	13	0	2	0	15	0
Birmingham	Total		88	1	6	0	94	1
Career total			134	1	8	0	142	1
