= Alleyn Court Prep School =

Coordinates: 51.55049°N 0.75975°E

Alleyn Court Preparatory School

Location
- Wakering Road; Great Wakering; Southend-on-Sea, Essex, SS3 0PW; England

Information
- Type: Independent school
- Motto: Non progredi est regredi ('Not to move forwards is to move backwards')
- Religious affiliation: Church of England
- Established: 1904
- Department for Education URN: 115403 Tables
- Head teacher: Mr Snow
- Gender: Mixed
- Age: 2 to 11
- Enrolment: Approx. 310 as of January 2015
- Capacity: 345
- Colours: Pink and Blue
- Website: http://www.alleyn-court.co.uk

Alleyn Court Prep School is a co-educational day preparatory school in Westcliff-on-Sea, Essex for children up to age 11.

== History ==
The school was founded in 1904 by Theodore Wilcox and first opened in September of that year. It was owned by the Wilcox family until 2015, when it was handed to a charitable trust.

== Reputation ==
According to the Independent Schools Council, the school "has high academic standards and an excellent reputation for sport and creative and performing arts." It also states that children "progress mostly to local grammar schools after 11+, with some also going to local Senior Independent Schools."

== Notable alumni ==
- Trevor Bailey, cricketer, cricket writer and broadcaster
- James Bourne, musician from Busted
- Baron Chelmer, Joint Treasurer of the Conservative party, 1965-1977
- Dick Clement, co-screenwriter for television series including The Likely Lads, Whatever Happened to the Likely Lads?, Porridge, Lovejoy and Auf Wiedersehen, Pet
- Sir Kenneth Cork, Lord Mayor of London, 1978–1979
- Mark Foster, world record 50 metre swimmer
- John Fowles, writer, works include The Magus and The French Lieutenant's Woman
- Jerry Hayes, Conservative politician, MP for Harlow in Essex, 1983-1997
- Stewart Robson, Arsenal, West Ham and Coventry footballer; now football writer
- Beau McDonald, football player Southend United
