= Wilcox, Somervell County, Texas =

Wilcox, Texas
- Ghost town
- Country: United States
- State: Texas
- County: Somervell
- Time zone: UTC-6 (Central (CST))
  - Summer (DST): UTC-5 (CDT)
- Area code: 254

Wilcox is a ghost town in northeastern Somervell County, Texas, near the present-day community of George's Creek.

== History ==
The town was named for William Cox, who settled along a nearby bend of the Brazos River in 1855. Soon after, more settlers followed, creating Wilcox. After the Civil War, the town's settlers moved to the community of George's Creek, which provided area farmers with a church, a school, and many businesses.
