= Alfred Jones (football manager) =

English football manager

Alfred Jones (fl. 1885–1915) was Small Heath's first secretary-manager. Appointed in 1892, the year of their admission to the Football League, he oversaw the club winning the inaugural Football League Second Division championship, promotion to the First Division the following year, and two further promotions before his retirement in 1908.

Jones worked as a manufacturer of scales. He began acting as unpaid secretary for Small Heath Alliance F.C. in 1885, the year they turned professional. That season they reached the semi-final of the FA Cup, which brought money into the club and broadened popular awareness of it. He supervised their entry into organised league football in the Football Alliance which started in 1889, and their subsequent invitation to join the newly formed Second Division of the Football League. It was at this point that Jones became the club's first paid secretary, and in addition took over responsibility for team affairs.

In Jones's first season as secretary-manager, Small Heath won the inaugural Second Division championship, though this did not bring automatic promotion; the club were unsuccessful in a test match against the bottom club in the First Division, Newton Heath. The following season the club were promoted via a test match victory over Darwen. Their stay in the top flight was brief, and with relegation came the loss of top players, falling attendances, and consequent reduced income. Despite the club's financial difficulties, Jones was responsible for some excellent players joining. In his 13-year tenure as manager his team were promoted three times, but relegated again three times. After the 1908 relegation, Jones was replaced as secretary-manager by Alex Watson, though he stayed at the club as part-time accountant until the First World War.
