= Frank Richards (football manager) =

English football manager (1869–1944)

Francis Haden Richards (9 July 1869 – 30 August 1944) was an English football manager and administrator. He served as secretary-manager of Birmingham, Preston North End and Bournemouth & Boscombe Athletic.

Richards' son Sam also became secretary of the Birmingham club, and joined their board of directors during the Second World War.

== Life and career ==
Richards was born in 1869 in Amblecote, Staffordshire, the son of Charles Richards, a wharfman who became a coal agent, and his wife, Emma née Haden. By 1891, the family had moved to Handsworth, in what is now Birmingham, and Richards was working as a commercial traveller. They had a lodger: George Ramsay, manager of Aston Villa F.C. Richards married Lilian Ann Baynes in 1893. The 1901 Census finds the couple and two sons living in Grove Lane, Handsworth; Richards was working as a commission agent selling jewellery, pianos and furniture.

Richards joined the St Andrew's office staff in 1907. The 1911 Census records him as assistant secretary, living in Fourth Avenue, Small Heath; his 15-year-old son Sam was also on the office staff. Richards was appointed club secretary later that year, and took over responsibility for team affairs in 1915 when the Football League was suspended because of the First World War. He oversaw the signing of a number of players who went on to give excellent service to Birmingham, including record goalscorer Joe Bradford, playmaker Johnny Crosbie, future manager George Liddell and England international goalkeeper Dan Tremelling; those four between them made over 1,500 Football League appearances for the club. In 1920–21 he led Birmingham to the championship of the Second Division. They failed to enter the 1921–22 FA Cup after Richards forgot to send in the forms in time to be exempt from qualifying, and the Football Association proved impervious to appeals for clemency; although that did not preclude their entering the competition in the qualifying rounds, the directors chose not to. In 1923, after two years in the top flight, Richards handed over responsibility for playing matters to former player Billy Beer, remaining as club secretary for a further two years.

In May 1925, Richards became secretary-manager of Preston North End. He hired former Birmingham and England centre-forward Harry Hampton as coach, and was responsible for bringing Alex James to the club. He held the post for two seasons, and from June 1928 he spent a further two years as secretary-manager of Bournemouth & Boscombe Athletic.

Richards died in Birmingham in August 1944 at the age of 75.

== Sources ==
- Matthews, Tony (1995). Birmingham City: A Complete Record. Derby: Breedon Books. ISBN 978-1-85983-010-9.
- Matthews, Tony (2000). The Encyclopedia of Birmingham City Football Club 1875–2000. Cradley Heath: Britespot. ISBN 978-0-9539288-0-4.
