= Joseph Wilcox =

English footballer

Personal information
- Full name: Joseph Wilcox
- Date of birth: 23 March 1887
- Place of birth: Walsall, England
- Date of death: 29 May 1964 (aged 77)
- Place of death: Walsall, England
- Height: 5 ft 6 in (1.68 m)
- Position: Outside right

Youth career
- Stourbridge Standard
- 1902–1903: Cradley Heath
- 1903–1906: Dudley

Senior career*
Years	Team	Apps	(Gls)
1906–1908	Aston Villa	6	(0)
1908–1911	Birmingham	47	(1)
1911–1912	Southampton	27	(5)
1912–1916	Wellington Town		
- * Club domestic league appearances and goals

Joseph Wilcox (23 March 1887 – 29 May 1964) was an English professional footballer who played as an outside right for various clubs in the years preceding the First World War.

== Football career ==
Wilcox was born in Walsall, Worcestershire and joined Aston Villa, initially as an amateur, in March 1906 before signing as a professional in November 1907. He only played six games in the Football League for Aston Villa, before joining Birmingham in a part-exchange deal involving George Travers in November 1908.

He was a winger who enjoyed beating opposing defenders, and was a creator of chances for others rather than a goalscorer. He played 48 games for Birmingham in all competitions before moving on to Southampton in May 1911.

Southampton's newly appointed manager, George Swift, spent a total of £820 on transfers, recruiting eleven new players during May and June 1911. Wilcox was one of the few of these signings who did himself justice in the new season, which ended in a 16th-place finish in the Southern League resulting in Swift's resignation. Playing at outside-right, Wilcox possessed speed and was able to deliver a variety of crosses, and also had the ability to "manoeuvre astutely" to beat the opposing full-back. He scored four goals in his first eleven games, but his form dipped towards the latter part of the season and, in March 1912, he lost his place to Sid Kimpton.

After the end of his one season at The Dell he dropped into non-league football with Wellington Town.

He died in Walsall on 29 May 1964, aged 77.
