= Wilcoxon =

Wilcoxon is a surname, and may refer to:

- Charles Wilcoxon, drum educator
- Henry Wilcoxon, an actor
- Frank Wilcoxon, chemist and statistician, inventor of two non-parametric tests for statistical significance:
  - The Wilcoxon signed-rank test (also known as the Wilcoxon T test)
  - The Wilcoxon rank-sum test (also known as the Mann–Whitney U test).

== See also ==
- Wilcox (surname)
