= Willock =

Willock is a surname. People having this surname include

- Andy Willock (b. 1964), a former English football midfielder
- Bernie Willock, a Canadian cyclist and businessman
- Brad Willock (b. 1962), a Canadian volleyball player
- Calum Willock (b. 1981), a Kittitian international footballer
- Charles Willock (1862–1919), English cricketer
- Chris Willock (born 1998), English footballer
- Colin Willock (1919–2005), a magazine editor and a nature documentary producer
- Dave Willock (1909–1990), an American character actor
- Erinne Willock (b. 1981), a Canadian cyclist
- Lieutenant-Colonel Sir Henry Willock, British Envoy to Persia 1815-1826
- Joe Willock (b. 1999), an English football midfielder, currently at Newcastle
- John Willock also (Willocks) (1515–1585), Scottish reformer
- Julian Willock, British Virgin Islander politician
- Marshall Willock (born 2000), British footballer
- Martin Willock (b. 1954), a Canadian cyclist
- Matty Willock (born 1996), English footballer
- Robert Willock (1893–1973), Royal Air Force officer
- Shay Willock (born 2003), English footballer
