= Wilcox =

Wilcox may refer to:

== Places ==
Canada

- Wilcox, Saskatchewan

United States

- Wilcox, Florida, an unincorporated community in Gilchrist County, Florida
- Wilcox, Missouri, an unincorporated community in Nodaway County, Missouri
- Wilcox, Nebraska
- Wilcox, Pennsylvania
- Wilcox, Washington
- Wilcox, Wisconsin
- Wilcox County, Alabama
- Wilcox County, Georgia
- Wilcox Township, Michigan
- Wilcox, Burleson County, Texas
- Wilcox, Somervell County, Texas
- Wilcox, Wyoming

== People ==
- Wilcox (surname)

== Other ==
- Wilcox Formation, a Paleogene age geologic formation in the Gulf of Mexico
- Wilcox (film), a 2019 Canadian drama film
- Wilcox, Crittenden Mill, a property in Middletown, Connecticut
- Adrian C. Wilcox High School, Santa Clara, California, USA
- Babcock & Wilcox, American manufacturer of power generation equipment
- George Wilcox & Co, a South Australian hide and wool business, which became Wilcox Mofflin Ltd.
- Wilcox Group, Canadian crisis management company
- Wilcox Health, Hospital and medical group in Hawaii
- Wilcox rebellions, rebellions in the Hawaiian sovereignty movement
- The Wilcoxon signed-rank test, a statistical test
- Snell & Wilcox, digital media products manufacturer

== See also ==
- Silcox (disambiguation)
- Willcox (disambiguation)
