= Logan family (historical) =

American family

Logan
- Current region: America
- Origin: North Carolina; Georgia
- Founded: 19th century
- Founder: Warren Logan; Adella Hunt Logan

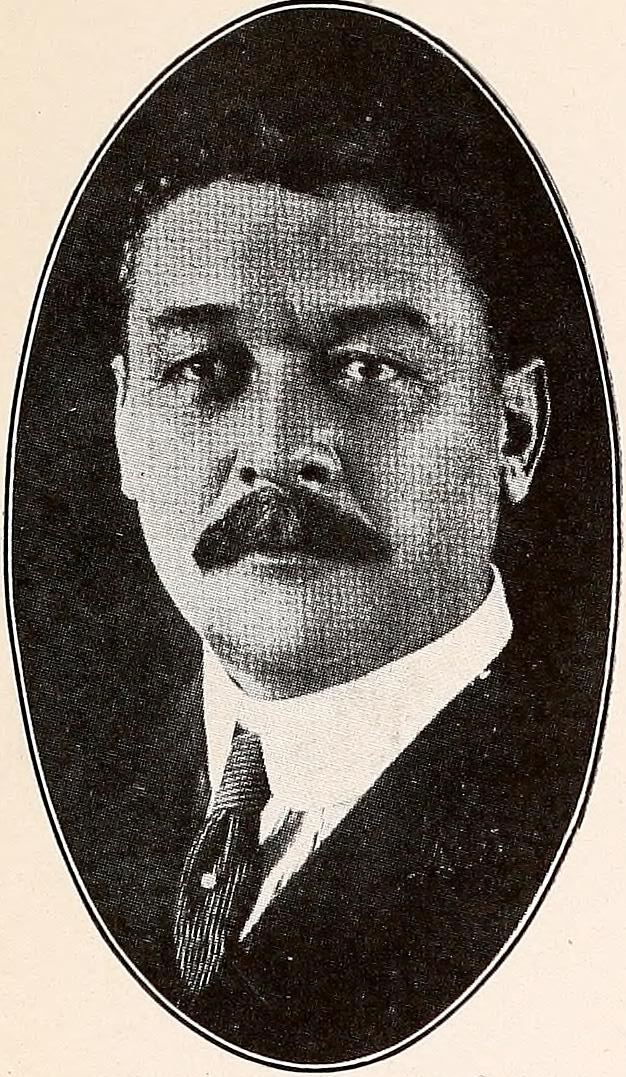
Warren Logan

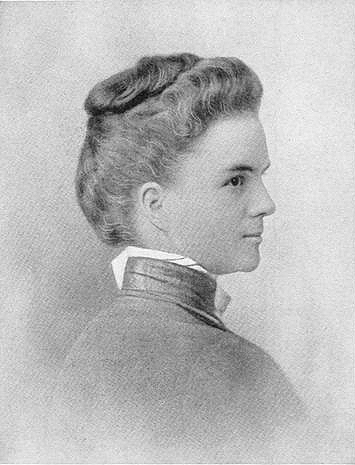
Adella Hunt Logan, 1902

The Logan family are African Americans descended from Warren Logan and his wife Adella Hunt Logan. The family has become part of the educated, professional black elite in the United States.

Warren Logan was born into slavery in North Carolina shortly before the American Civil War. Adella Hunt was born free during the Civil War to a free woman of color and a white plantation owner who had a common-law marriage. After gaining educations, the couple met as teachers at Tuskegee Institute.

They married and had several children. As teachers, they also established a family tradition of "education and decorum as a way to transcend racial restrictions". They and their descendants used education for advancement, and have become part of the professional class.

== History ==
Warren was born into slavery in North Carolina in 1859 and was visibly of mixed-race African and European ancestry. At emancipation he took the surname Logan. He graduated from Hampton Normal and Agricultural Institute in Virginia in 1877 and then taught bookkeeping at Tuskegee Normal School in Alabama. Starting in 1883, Warren also served as director of choral singing and director of the school band.

As a young educated man in the period after the Reconstruction era, Logan pushed against the social restraints imposed by white supremacists in the South. For instance, he and a group of friends tried to use their first-class train tickets between Montgomery and Selma, Alabama. They were ordered to the Jim Crow car and ejected when they hesitated to move. Logan became the first treasurer of Tuskegee Institute in 1882, and is described as the closest confidante of the institute's head, Booker T. Washington. He later served as vice president and was a member of the board of trustees at Tuskegee.

In 1888 Logan married Adella Hunt, also a teacher at Tuskegee. Under the state's slavery laws, she was born free in February 1863 in Sparta, Georgia, as her mother was a free woman of color. (By the principle of partus sequitur ventrem, children at birth took their mother's status.) Her father was a white plantation owner. While her parents could not legally marry under the state's racial laws, they had a common-law marriage and her father acknowledged their family of eight children. He aided Adella financially so that she could attend Atlanta University, an historically black college founded by the American Missionary Association, where she graduated in 1881.

Hunt became a teacher at Tuskegee in 1883. Both the Hunts and Logans considered education the key to the advancement of people of color in society. Teaching English and social sciences, Hunt succeeded Olivia A. Davidson as Lady Principal when, in 1885, Davidson married Booker T. Washington, head of the institute.

Adella Hunt Logan is known as an educator and an administrator. She supported women's suffrage, lectured at NAACP conferences, and published articles in its Crisis magazine. She is also remembered for her essay, "What Are the Causes of the Great Mortality Among the Negroes of the Cities of the South, and How Is That Mortality to Be Lessened?" (1902).

In 1915, Hunt Logan was hospitalized for severe depression. Learning of Booker T. Washington's last illness, she returned to the institute. Washington died November 14, and Hunt Logan continued to struggle with depression. She committed suicide by jumping from the top floor of one of the school buildings on December 12, 1915.

Warren Logan retired in 1924. A building that was constructed on Tuskegee's campus in 1931 and served as an auditorium and gymnasium was named Logan Hall, after Warren.

== Descendants ==
The Logans had nine children together; six survived to adulthood and all became educated.

- Arthur C. Logan (c. 1905–1973) was the youngest son born to Warren and Adella Hunt Logan. He was educated at a private school in New York City and college, and became a surgeon in New York City. He also served as personal physician to musician and composer Duke Ellington from 1937, and to Billy Strayhorn. Strayhorn's composition "U.M.M.G. (Upper Manhattan Medical Group)" honored Logan among the founders and partners of the ground-breaking clinic. Logan was appointed by Mayor Robert F. Wagner as first chairman of the New York City Council Against Poverty.
  - Arthur Logan first married Wenonah Bond. They had a daughter, Adele Logan, before divorcing. Adele attended the Ethical Culture Fieldston School in New York, as had her father. Later she earned a doctorate in history and became a professor at George Washington University. As Adele Logan Alexander, she has written extensively on African-American history, including a detailed history of her ancestors, Homelands and Waterways (1990), tracing their journeys from slavery. She begins with her maternal great-grandfather John Robert Bond, a mixed-race black English man who came to the US as a sailor in 1862 and served with the Union. She was married to Clifford Alexander, Jr. (1933–2022), who was the first African American to serve as Secretary of the Army.
    - Their daughter Elizabeth Alexander (born 1962) is a poet and scholar who currently serves as the President of the Andrew W. Mellon Foundation. She was formerly a professor at Yale University in the African American Studies Department and a professor at Columbia University in the Department of English and Comparative Literature. She read from her work at the inauguration of Barack Obama in 2009.
    - Their son Mark C. Alexander is the dean of Villanova University School of Law. He was previously an associate dean for academics and law professor at Seton Hall University. He was a political organizer and aide, having served as state organizer for President Barack Obama's first campaign in New Jersey and as an advisor. He has also worked with Mayor Cory Booker of Newark, and US Senators Edward Kennedy and Bill Bradley.
  - Arthur Logan's second marriage was to Marian Bruce (1919–1993), a cabaret singer and recording artist. She became politically active, working with the NAACP and serving as a board member of the Southern Christian Leadership Conference (SCLC). In addition, she was a Democratic campaign worker, and was appointed as head of the New York City Commission on Human Rights in 1977–'79. (She appears in the documentary Duke Ellington: Reminiscing in Tempo, 1991, American Experience, PBS.)
    - Arthur and Marian had one child, Warren Arthur Logan (born 1963). In 1991 Warren Arthur Logan married Julie Lizabeth Wagman of New York City; she is the daughter of Karen Kronenberg of New York and Martin Wagman of Roslyn, Long Island. Logan was then working as an investigator for United Claims Service, and was a partner in a company importing African art.
- Myra Adele Logan (1908–1977) was the youngest daughter born to Warren and Adella Hunt Logan. After her education, she went onto have a career as a surgeon. She was the first woman to perform an open-heart surgery.
