= Wenonah Bond Logan =

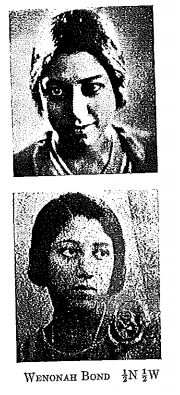
- Photos of Wenonah Bond as found in the Caroline Day Papers from the study of mixed families in the United States (Plate 35, C29). Wenonah Bond was of white, African, and Native American descent.
- Born: December 18, 1906; Georgia, United States
- Died: September 11, 1993 (aged 86); Alabama
- Occupations: Scholar, sociologist, secretary, organizer
- Spouse: Arthur C. Logan
- Children: 1
- Family: Elizabeth Alexander (grandchild)

Wenonah Bond Logan, also Wenonah Bond, (born December 18, 1906) was an American scholar and sociologist. She attended Atlanta University, Boston University and the New York School of Social Work. It was in New York at the School of Social Work where in 1930 Bond Logan received a scholarship in conjunction with the National Urban League, to study abroad in Helsignor, Denmark at the International People's College and at Woodbrooke in Birmingham, England. Bond Logan is the grandmother of American poet and essayist Elizabeth Alexander who recited "Praise Song for the Day" at Barack Obama's 2009 Presidential Inauguration. Bond Logan is the source of inspiration for Alexander's chapter "My Grandmother's Hair" from her work Power and Possibility.

== Life ==
Georgia Faigan first married Moses West in 1888 and had a daughter named Caroline. Georgia remarried to John Bond in 1905 after Moses West passed away. Together, Georgia and John had two children, Wenonah and her brother John. In total, Georgia had three children. Wenonah had a dark-olive complexion, with coarse dark hair that is slightly straighter and lighter than that of her brother. The family was included in a Harvard sociology study of Negro-White families in the United States. A lock of Wenonah's hair remains at the Harvard Peabody archive as a part of the study conducted in 1927.

Wenonah studied abroad in Europe through 1930 -1931. On January 5, 1934, Wenonah married Arthur C. Logan at St. Martin's Church in New York City. Wenonah gives birth to their daughter, Adele Bond. In 1959 Adele marries Clifford L. Alexander Jr. and three years later Adele and Clifford have Elizabeth. Wenonah and Elizabeth would bond while brushing each other's hair. After her grandmother's death, this is how Elizabeth is reminded of Wenonah.

== Education and career ==
Wenonah Bond Logan studied sociology at Atlanta University, Boston University and New York School of social work in the United States. In April 1930, Bond Logan set sail to Denmark to study international sociology at the International People's College in Helsignor. Students at the International People's College asked Bond Logan about race problems in the United States and everyday life. In May 1930, Bond Logan wrote to W. E. B. Du Bois asking him to send materials to help her evidence the experiences of black people in the United States. Following her five-month study in Denmark, Bond Logan then spent a year studying in England.

Bond Logan served as the Girl Reserve Secretary for the YWCA of West 137th in Brooklyn. She continued this position after her study abroad trips.

In 1931 Bond Logan became a part of the James Weldon Johnson literary guild.

== Death ==
Wenonah Bond Logan died on September 11, 1993, at the age of 86.
