= Arthur C. Logan =

African-American surgeon (c. 1905–1973)

- Born: c. 1905; Tuskegee, Alabama, U.S.
- Died: November 25, 1973 (aged 67–68); Manhattan, New York City, U.S.
- Occupations: Surgeon and civic leader
- Family: Logan family

Arthur C. Logan (c. 1905 – November 25, 1973) was a surgeon. The year after he died, the 1862-founded Knickerbocker Hospital was renamed in his memory; he had been a member of New York City's Health and Hospitals Corporation and was also described as a civic leader. In 1970, he was honored, with attendees including the Governor, a future governor, an ambassador, and many others.

== Family ==
Born in Tuskegee, Alabama, Arthur C. Logan was a descendant of the Logan family, known for valuing "education and decorum as a way to transcend racial restrictions". He was the youngest of nine children.

Logan was educated at a private school in New York City. He graduated from Williams College and became a surgeon in New York City. He also served as personal physician to musician and composer Duke Ellington from 1937, and to Billy Strayhorn. Strayhorn's composition "U.M.M.G. (Upper Manhattan Medical Group)" honored Logan among the founders and partners of the ground-breaking clinic. Logan was appointed by Mayor Robert F. Wagner as first chairman of the New York City Council Against Poverty.

Logan and his first wife, Wenonah Bond, had a daughter Adele Logan before their divorce. Adele attended the Ethical Culture Fieldston School in New York, as had her father. Later she earned a doctorate in history and became a professor at George Washington University. As Adele Logan Alexander, she has written extensively on African-American history; through her, Logan became a grandfather.

Logan's second marriage was to Marian Bruce (1919–1993), a cabaret singer and recording artist.

Logan's son Warren was aged 10 at the time of his father's death in Manhattan in November 1973.
