= Noëlle Ffrench Davies =

Littérateur, educationist, and political activist (1899–1983)

- Born: 25 December 1899; Mount Talbot
- Died: 14 February 1983; Mount Talbot
- Political party: Plaid Cymru
- Spouse: David James Davies

Noëlle Ffrench (25 December 1899 – 14 February 1983), known after marriage as Noëlle Ffrench Davies, was an Irish poet, economist, writer, educator, and political activist.

She was born in County Roscommon and settled in Wales in 1925, playing an important role in the development of debates on Welsh economic nationalism. She was married to the Welsh economist and political thinker David James Davies, and together they worked on policies and campaigned for Plaid Cymru in the 1930s–50s. Ffrench also ran initiatives to set up folk high schools (based on the N.F.S. Grundtvig model in Denmark) in Ireland and Wales.

== Early life ==
Noëlle Ffrench was born on Christmas Day, after which she is named, on a farm called Bushy Park near Mount Talbot, County Roscommon. Her family were wealthy farmers: her father came from County Galway and spoke Irish, although he was a Unionist, while her mother was Catholic and had a more Irish nationalist outlook.

She studied and taught at the French School in Bray, County Wicklow from 1914 to 1918, then attended Trinity College Dublin, graduating with first-class honours in Classics and Modern Languages in 1922. She knew the famous republican leader Michael Collins.

== Career ==
In January 1924, Ffrench started working as a lecturer at the People's International College in Elsinore, Denmark. There she met D.J. Davies, a Welshman from Ammanford, who travelled to Denmark in 1924 to study at the International College. She and "Dai" (as she called D.J. Davies) returned to Dublin in 1924 with the aim of setting up a People's School there. Unfortunately, due to opposition from the Catholic Church, it became clear there was no future for the educational initiative.

In May 1925, Noëlle and D. J. Davies moved to Wales. She worked as an educator, lecturer, and author. She also worked, along with her husband, to develop economic policy for the newly-established Welsh National Party (which later became Plaid Cymru). During this time, she travelled to France, Belgium, and Germany.

In 1931, they moved to a country house called Pantybeiliau, sited between Brynmawr and the village of Gilwern. They planned to set up a Welsh Folk High School for unemployed young men and women, with the curriculum covering world history, the cultural life of Wales and various crafts. In 1934, they received government funding, allowing the school to open for its first term. However, the Ministry of Labour's financial support was withdrawn, and the school was forced to close in 1935.

Davies could speak and write in at least five languages, and she was a poet from a young age. Her published writings covered a wide range of topics, including education, history, and Welsh political and economic matters, often with undertones of Irish nationalism. In 1931, she published a book on N. F. S. Grundtvig called Education for Life, A Danish Pioneer. She published a collection of her poems, Middle Country, in 1936.

== Later years and death ==
After her husband's death in 1956, Davies moved to Greystones, County Wicklow. She was a founding member of several progressive civic organisations, including the Celtic League (1961) and the Irish Anti-Apartheid Movement (1964). In 1957, she was involved in the People's School of Ireland (Daonscoil na hEireann), and she funded scholarships in the 1960s and 1970s to enable young members of Plaid Cymru to attend summer courses in Europe.

Davies moved back to her family's farm, Bushy Park, in the 1970s, where she lived until her death on 14 February 1983.

== Legacy ==
Nineteen boxes of papers and documents written by Davies between 1926 and 1979 are archived at the National Library of Wales. They are written in English, Welsh and Irish.
