= Elizabeth Alexander (poet) =

American poet (born 1962)

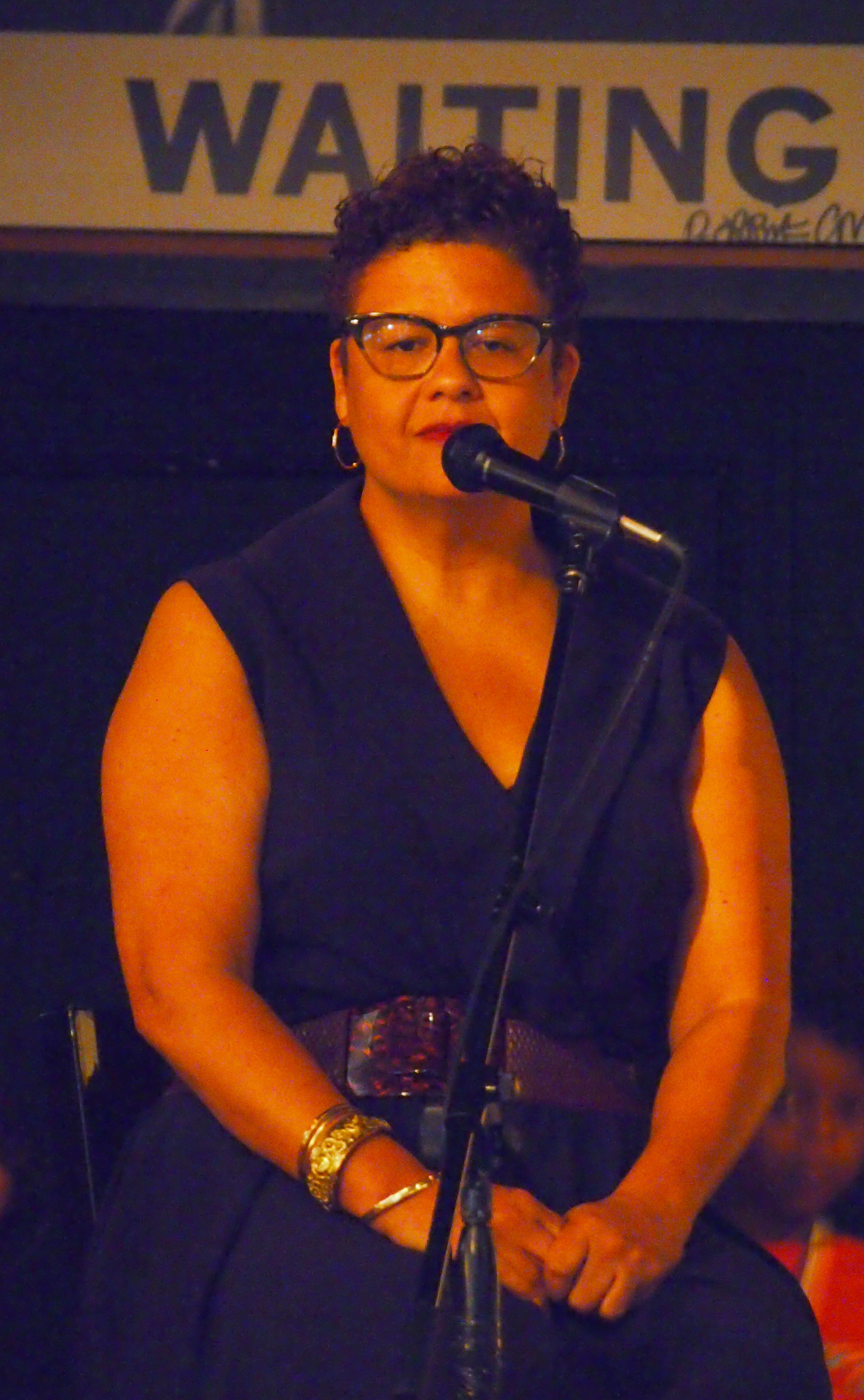
- Born: May 30, 1962 (age 64); Harlem, New York City, U.S.
- Education: Yale University (BA); Boston University (MA); University of Pennsylvania (PhD)
- Spouse: Ficre Ghebreyesus (deceased 2012)
- Children: 2 sons
- Relatives: Clifford Alexander Jr. (father); Mark C. Alexander (brother); Arthur C. Logan (grandfather); Myra Adele Logan (greataunt)

Elizabeth Alexander (born May 30, 1962) is an American poet, writer, and literary scholar who has served as the president of the Andrew W. Mellon Foundation since 2018.

Previously, Alexander was a professor for 15 years at Yale University, where she taught poetry and chaired the African American studies department. In 2015, she was appointed director of creativity and free expression at the Ford Foundation. She then joined the faculty of Columbia University in 2016, as the Wun Tsun Tam Mellon Professor in the Humanities in the Department of English and Comparative Literature. In 2022, Time named Alexander one of 100 Most Influential People in World.

== Early life and education ==
Alexander was born in Harlem, New York City, and grew up in Washington, D.C. She is the daughter of former United States Secretary of the Army and Equal Employment Opportunity Commission Chairman Clifford Alexander Jr. and Adele Logan Alexander, a professor of African-American women's history at George Washington University and writer. Her brother Mark C. Alexander was a senior adviser to the Barack Obama presidential campaign and a member of the president-elect's transition team. After she was born, the family moved to Washington, D.C. She was just a toddler when her parents took her in August 1963 to the March on Washington site of Martin Luther King Jr.'s famous "I Have A Dream" speech. Alexander recalled that "Politics was in the drinking water at my house". She also took ballet as a child.

She graduated from Sidwell Friends School in 1980. From there she went to Yale University and graduated with a bachelor's degree in 1984. She studied poetry at Boston University under Derek Walcott and got her master's degree in 1987. Her mother said to her: "That poet you love, Derek Walcott, is teaching at Boston University. Why don't you apply?" Alexander originally entered studying fiction writing, but Walcott looked at her diary and saw the poetry potential. Alexander said, "He gave me a huge gift. He took a cluster of words and he lineated it. And I saw it."

In 1992, she received her PhD in English from the University of Pennsylvania. While she was finishing her degree, she taught at nearby Haverford College from 1990 to 1991. At this time, she would publish her first work, The Venus Hottentot. The title comes from Sarah Baartman, a 19th-century South African woman of the Khoikhoi ethnic group. Alexander is an alumna of the Ragdale Foundation.

== Academic career ==
While a graduate student, she was a reporter for The Washington Post from 1984 to 1985. She soon realized that "it wasn't the life I wanted." She began teaching at University of Chicago in 1991 as an assistant professor of English. Here she would first meet future president Barack Obama, who was a senior lecturer at the school's law school from 1992 until his election to the U.S. Senate in 2004. While in Chicago in 1992, she won a creative writing fellowship from the National Endowment for the Arts.

In 1996, she published a volume of poetry, Body of Life, and a verse play, Diva Studies, which was staged at Yale University. She also became a founding faculty member of the Cave Canem workshop which helps develop African-American poets. In 1997, she received the University of Chicago's Quantrell Award for excellence in undergraduate teaching. Later in that year, she moved to Massachusetts to teach at Smith College. She became the Grace Hazard Conkling poet-in-residence and the first director of the college's Poetry Center. In 2000, she returned to Yale University, where she would teach African American studies and English. She also released her third poetry collection, Antebellum Dream Book. In 2005, she was selected in the first class of Alphonse Fletcher Foundation fellows and in 2007–08, she was an academic fellow at the Radcliffe Institute for Advanced Study at Harvard.

In 2007, Alexander became the first recipient of the Jackson Poetry Prize, an annual prize awarded by Poets & Writers that "honors an American poet of exceptional talent who deserves wider recognition." Since 2008, Alexander has chaired the African American Studies department at Yale University. She currently teaches English language/literature, African-American literature and gender studies at Yale. In 2015, Alexander was elected a Chancellor of the Academy of American Poets. In 2016, she became the Wun Tsun Tam Mellon Professor in the Humanities at Columbia University. She was awarded an honorary Doctor of Letters degree by Yale University in 2018. She was elected to the American Academy of Arts and Sciences in 2019. In 2020 she was elected to the American Philosophical Society.

== Works ==
Alexander's poems, short stories and critical writings have been widely published in such journals and periodicals such as: The Paris Review, American Poetry Review, The Kenyon Review, The Village Voice, Poetry magazine, The Women's Review of Books, and The Washington Post. Her play Diva Studies, which was performed at the Yale School of Drama, garnered her a National Endowment for the Arts creative writing fellowship as well as an Illinois Arts Council award.

Her 2005 volume of poetry American Sublime was one of three finalists for the Pulitzer Prize of that year. Alexander is also a scholar of African-American literature and culture and recently published a collection of essays entitled The Black Interior. Alexander received the Anisfield-Wolf Book Award Lifetime Achievement Award in Poetry in 2010.

=== 2009 U.S. presidential inauguration ===
On January 20, 2009, at the presidential inauguration of Barack Obama, Alexander recited her poem "Praise Song for the Day", which she had composed for the occasion. She became only the fourth poet to read at an American presidential inauguration, after Robert Frost in 1961, Maya Angelou in 1993 and Miller Williams in 1997.

The announcement of her selection was favorably received by her fellow poets Maya Angelou, Rita Dove, Paul Muldoon, and Jay Parini, who extolled her as "smart, deeply educated in the traditions of poetry, true to her roots, responsive to black culture." The Poetry Foundation also hailed the choice: "Her selection affirms poetry's central place in the soul of our country."

Though the selection of the widely unknown poet, who was a personal friend of Obama, was lauded, the actual poem and delivery were met with a poor reception. the Chicago Tribune, the Los Angeles Times Book editor, and most critics found that "her poem was too much like prose," and that "her delivery [was] insufficiently dramatic." Adam Kirsch of The New Republic found the poem "dull, 'bureaucratic' and found it proved that 'the poet's place is not on the platform but in the crowd, that she should speak not for the people but to them.'"

Alexander wrote of her experience of reading at the inauguration in The New Yorker in January 2017. Alexander brought her father, who had attended the 1963 March on Washington for Jobs and Freedom, to sit next to her at the inauguration. At the rehearsal for the inauguration, Alexander read Gwendolyn Brooks's poem "kitchenette building".

== Personal life ==
Alexander's mother is a member of the Logan family, a part of the old African-American upper class. Her grandfather was Dr. Arthur C. Logan and her greataunt was Dr. Myra Adele Logan. Alexander was married to Ficre Ghebreyesus until his death in April 2012. She lives with their two sons in New York City. She is a member of Alpha Kappa Alpha sorority. In 2010, Alexander participated in Henry Louis Gates Jr.'s PBS series Faces of America, which explored her ancestry and analyzed her DNA.

== Bibliography ==
=== Poetry ===
Collections

- Alexander, Elizabeth (1990). The Venus Hottentot. Graywolf Press.
- — (1996). Body of Life. Chicago: Tia Chucha Press.
- — (2001). Antebellum dream book. Graywolf Press. ISBN 9781555973544.
- — (2005). American Sublime. Graywolf Press. ISBN 9781555974329.
- —, ed. (2005). The Essential Gwendolyn Brooks. Library of America.
- — (2006). American Blue: Selected Poems. Bloodaxe Books.
- —; Nelson, Marilyn (2007). Miss Crandall's School for Young Ladies and Little Misses of Color: Poems. Honesdale, Pa.: Wordsong.
- — (2009). Praise Song for the Day. Graywolf Press. ISBN 9781555975456.
- — (2010). Crave Radiance: New and Selected Poems 1998-2010. Graywolf Press.

List of poems

Title	Year	First published	Reprinted/collected
Early cinema			Alexander, Elizabeth (2001). Antebellum dream book. Graywolf Press. ISBN 9781555973544.; Alexander, Elizabeth (March 2, 2020). "Early cinema". Poetry Foundation.

=== Essays and introductions ===
- Dixon, Melvin (1995). Love's Instruments. Introduction by Elizabeth Alexander. Chicago: Tia Chuca Press.
- Alexander, Elizabeth (2004). The Black Interior. Graywolf Press. ISBN 9781555973933.
- — (2007). Power and Possibility: Essays, Reviews, and Interviews. Poets on Poetry. Ann Arbor: University of Michigan Press.

=== Memoirs ===
- Alexander, Elizabeth (2015). The Light of the World: A Memoir. New York: Grand Central Publishing.
- — (February 9, 2015). "Lottery tickets : grieving for a husband". Personal History. The New Yorker. Vol. 90, no. 47. pp. 24–28.

=== Critical studies and reviews of Alexander's work ===
- Anon. (April 11, 2015). "How to remember". Books and Arts. The Economist. Vol. 415, no. 8933. pp. 75–76. Review of The Light of the World.
- Gollin, Andrea (May 1, 2015). "Review: Elizabeth Alexander's 'The Light of the World'". Miami Herald. "In art, in poetry and in her community of friends and family, Alexander finds divinity. The memoir itself is, of course, art. Its eloquent, grief-struck gratitude draws the reader in, and we celebrate and mourn alongside Alexander."
