= Ghebreyesus =

Ghebreyesus is a surname. Notable people with this surname include:

- Ficre Ghebreyesus (1962–2012), Eritrean-American artist
- Fisihasion Ghebreyesus (born 1941), Ethiopian cyclist
- Tedros Adhanom Ghebreyesus (born 1965), Ethiopian politician and Director-General of the World Health Organization
