= Percy A. Pierre =

American academic administrator (born 1939)

- Born: Percy Anthony Pierre; January 3, 1939 (age 87); Welcome, Louisiana, US
- Occupations: Electrical engineer, university administrator
- Known for: First African American to earn a Ph.D. in electrical engineering Development of M1 Abrams, Patriot missile, AH-64 Apache; National minority engineering programs
- Spouse: Olga Markham Pierre (m. 1965; died 2024)
- Children: 2
- Awards: National Academy of Engineering (2009); Distinguished Service Medal, U.S. Army (1981); Lifetime Mentor Award, AAAS (2008)

Academic background
- Education: University of Notre Dame (B.S.E.E. 1961, M.S.E.E. 1963); Johns Hopkins University (Ph.D. 1967); University of Michigan (Postdoctoral 1968)
- Alma mater: Johns Hopkins University
- Thesis: Properties of non-Gaussian, continuous parameter, random processes as used in detection theory (1967)
- Doctoral advisor: Ferdinand Hamburger Jr.

Academic work
- Discipline: Electrical engineering
- Sub-discipline: Signal processing Stochastic processes
- Institutions: Southern University; Morgan State University; University of Michigan; RAND Corporation; Howard University; UCLA; U.S. Department of the Army; Prairie View A&M University; Michigan State University; University of Maryland
- Main interests: Probability and statistics Information theory Electronic communications
- Notable works: Research on non-Gaussian random processes in communications systems
- Website: ece.umd.edu/clark/faculty/1264/Percy-A-Pierre

Percy Anthony Pierre (born January 3, 1939) is an American electrical engineer and academic administrator specializing in signal processing, stochastic processes, and the statistical analysis of communications systems. He received his doctorate degree from Johns Hopkins University in 1967, and is recognized as the first African-American to receive a Ph.D. in electrical engineering. His early research on non-Gaussian random processes and signal detection, funded by the Navy for sonar applications, resulted in twelve publications in leading mathematics and engineering journals between 1969 and 1971.

In the 1970s, Pierre was a principal architect of the first national engineering education program for minority students. From 1977 to 1981, he served as assistant secretary of the U.S. Army for research, development, and acquisition, where he oversaw the development of the M1 Abrams tank, MIM-104 Patriot missile system, and AH-64 Apache helicopter. As a university administrator, he was dean of engineering at Howard University, president of Prairie View A&M University, and vice president for research and graduate studies at Michigan State University. He is a graduate and former trustee of Notre Dame University, and is currently Glenn L. Martin Endowed Professor in the Department of Electrical and Computer Engineering at the University of Maryland.

== Early life and education ==
Pierre was born on January 3, 1939, to Rosa Villavaso and Percy John Pierre in Welcome, St. James Parish, Louisiana. In 1957, Pierre graduated from St. Augustine High School in New Orleans. He credits the priests at St. Augustine with instilling in him two overriding missions: to excel intellectually in engineering and use his career to make a difference in the lives of other African-Americans.

Pierre attended the University of Notre Dame on scholarship, earning his bachelor's and master's degrees in electrical engineering in 1961 and 1963. In 1977, he received an honorary doctorate degree from Notre Dame in recognition of his public service, and in 2022, he received the Distinguished Graduate Alumni Award.

Pierre earned his Ph.D. in electrical engineering at Johns Hopkins University in 1967, the first African American to receive a doctorate degree in electrical engineering. At Johns Hopkins, Pierre focused on signal processing and began his work on non-Gaussian random representations, specifically in the statistical analysis of communications systems. His dissertation research, funded by the Navy, had applications in the understanding and use of underwater sonar. He was a postdoctoral fellow at the University of Michigan from 1967 to 1968.

== Research ==
Pierre's research focused on stochastic processes in communications systems, particularly non-Gaussian random processes and their applications to signal detection and estimation theory. Between 1969 and 1971, he published twelve papers in leading mathematics and engineering journals, establishing foundational work in the field.

His publications during this period appeared in the Annals of Mathematical Statistics, IEEE Transactions on Information Theory, SIAM Journal on Applied Mathematics, Zeitschrift für Wahrscheinlichkeitstheorie und Verwandte Gebiete, Information and Control, and the Journal of Mathematical Analysis and Applications. His work addressed topics including central limit theorems for conditionally linear random processes, the characterization of Gaussian random processes, singular non-Gaussian measures in detection and estimation theory, and the convergence of error probabilities for signal detection.

Pierre continued research throughout his administrative career. In 1990, he received a $236,000 grant from the Office of Naval Research for research on "Linear White Noise Models of Samples of Stationary, Non-Gaussian, Band Limited Signals in Noise." He taught graduate and undergraduate courses in probability and statistics, information theory, and electronic communications at the University of Michigan, UCLA, Howard University, Morgan State University, Southern University, and Prairie View A&M University.

== Career ==
Pierre began his career as a researcher at the Rand Corporation in 1968. He served as a White House Fellow in 1969, working for Daniel "Pat" Moynihan on domestic affairs during the Nixon administration. From 1969 to 1970, he worked as deputy to the Assistant to the President for Urban Affairs.

=== Howard University ===
In 1971, Pierre was named Dean of the College of Engineering, Architecture and Computer Sciences (CEACS) at Howard University. During his tenure, he introduced master's degree programs in urban systems engineering and computer science, and doctoral programs in electrical engineering and mechanical engineering. In his role as dean, he co-chaired the first National Academy of Engineering (NAE) Symposium in 1973, which attracted more than 230 academic, corporate, and government representatives. The symposium's participants discussed the engineering education system and how minority engineering students interacted within that system. Pierre was considered a leader in developing and implementing programs to recruit, retain, and graduate engineering students from diverse populations.

During his tenure at Howard, he was invited to work as a half-time program officer with the Alfred P. Sloan Foundation. The Sloan Foundation supported the 1973 NAE Symposium and committed $12 - $15 million over a five to seven year period for a special program for minorities in engineering. In his role, Pierre helped to establish numerous minority engineering organizations to increase the financial support and mentoring opportunities available for minority engineering students. These include the National Action Council for Minorities in Engineering (NACME); National Consortium for Graduate Degrees for Minorities in Engineering and Science (GEM); Math, Engineering and Science Achievement (MESA); and Southeastern Consortium of Minorities in Engineering (SECME).

=== U.S. Army ===
In 1977, Pierre was named assistant secretary for research, development, and regulation of the U.S. Army, the first African-American to hold that position or similar position in the armed services. Pierre managed a $12 billion annual budget for research and development that included the completion of the development and initial production of the Abrams tank in 1979 and the Patriot missile system and Apache helicopter in 1980.

In January 1981, he was named Acting Secretary of the U. S. Army, the first African-American appointed to that position.

=== Prairie View A&M University ===
In 1983, Pierre was elected President of Prairie View A&M University. During his tenure, he established the Roy G. Perry College of Engineering Technology and the Benjamin Banneker Honors College. In addition, he oversaw the renovation and reopening of the campus' John B. Coleman Library.

=== Michigan State University ===
In 1990, Pierre joined Michigan State University as vice president of research and graduate studies, and professor of electrical and computer engineering. During his 28-year tenure, he mentored more than 200 graduate students in engineering. In 2018, he announced his retirement from Michigan State.

=== University of Maryland ===
In 2019, Pierre was named an Adjunct Professor and Glenn L. Martin Endowed Professor in the Department of Electrical and Computer Engineering at the University of Maryland.

== Personal ==
On August 8, 1965, Pierre married Olga Agnes Markham. The couple had two daughters, Kristin and Allison. In 2024, Olga Markham Pierre (b. 1940) died from pancreatic cancer complications.

== Honors and awards ==
Pierre has received numerous professional accolades and awards. The following is a representative sample:

- 1977: Honorary Doctoral Degree, The University of Notre Dame
- 1979: Senator Proximire Award for Excellence, US Congress, for presentations of the Department of the Army's Research Development, and Acquisition Budgets for FY 79
- 1980: Senator Proximire Award for Excellence, US Congress, for presentations of the Department of the Army's Research Development, and Acquisition Budgets for FY 80
- 1981: Distinguished Service Medal, US Army
- 1984: Honorary Doctoral Degree, Rensselaer Polytechnic Institute
- 1984: Reginald Jones Award, National Action Council for Minorities in Engineering
- 1990: Regents Visiting Professor, University of California at Berkeley
- 1993: Superior Public Service Award, US Navy
- 1997: Frazier Thompson Pioneer Award, Black Alumni of the University of Notre Dame
- 2003: Frederick Scott Award, Society of Black Alumni of the Johns Hopkins University
- 2003: The Golden Torch Award, National Society of Black Engineers
- 2004: Diversity Award, Michigan State University
- 2004: Founder's Award, National Action Council for Minorities in Engineering
- 2008: Cavanaugh Award for Public Service, University of Notre Dame Alumni Association
- 2008: Lifetime Mentor Award, American Association for the Advancement of Science
- 2009: Member, National Academy of Engineering, one of the highest professional honors for an engineer.
- 2013: Named a "Game Changer" in the 100 year History of Engineering at Johns Hopkins University
- 2021: Harriet Shriver Rogers Lecture, Johns Hopkins University
- 2022: Distinguished Graduate Alumni Award, Notre Dame University

== Boards and affiliations ==
- Trustee, The University of Notre Dame, 1974-2019; Hesburgh Trustee, 2022-current
- Trustee, The White House Fellows Foundation, Treasurer, Washington, DC, 1981-1983
- Member, Advisory Council, Lincoln Laboratory, The Massachusetts Institute of Technology, Lexington, MA, 1981-1995
- Member, NASA Advisory Council, National Aeronautics and Space Administration, Washington, DC, 1982-85
- Trustee, National Action Council for Minorities in Engineering (NACME), New York, NY, 1983-1989
- Director, Center for Naval Analyses, Alexandria, VA, Chairman of Technical Advisory Committee, 1983-1993
- Member, The Army Science Board, Office of the Secretary of the Army, 1983-85
- Trustee, The Southwestern Athletic Conference, New Orleans, LA, 1983-1989, Chairman 1985-87
- Trustee, The Hitachi Foundation, 1985-1998
- Member, National Security Advisory Board, Los Alamos National Laboratory, 1989-1994
- Trustee, The Aerospace Corporation, 1991-1999
- Member, NASA Advisory Council, University Relations Task Force, National Aeronautics and Space Administration, 1991
- Commission on the Future of the National Science Foundation, National Science Foundation, Washington, DC, 1991-92
- Director, Michigan Biotechnology Institute, 1991-95
- Director, CMS Energy Corp., a $6 billion public utility in Michigan, 1992-2010
- Director, Consortium for International Environmental Science Information Network, Saginaw, MI, 1992-96
- Director, Old Kent Financial Corporation, 1992-2002
- Advisory Council, The Electric Power Research Institute, Palo Alto, CA, 1993-2003
- Director, Industrial Technology Institute, Ann Arbor, MI
- Member, Defense Science Board, Office of the Secretary of Defense, Washington, DC, 1993-96
- Member, Board of Overseers, Fermi National Accelerator Laboratory, 1993-99
- Director, Whitman Education Group, Miami, Florida, 1995-2003
- Trustee, Hampshire College, Amherst, MA, 1996-2005
- Founding chairman, National Academy of Engineering's Racial Justice and Equity Committee

== Publications ==
=== Technical publications ===
- Pierre, Percy A. (1969). "Properties of Random Functions with Applications to Communications Theory." Annals of Mathematical Statistics 40 (1).
- Pierre, Percy A. (1969). "Singular Non-Gaussian Measures in Detection and Estimation Theory." IEEE Transactions on Information Theory IT-15 (2).
- Pierre, Percy A. (1969). "On the Independence of Linear Functionals of Linear Processes." SIAM Journal on Applied Mathematics 17 (4).
- Pierre, Percy A. (1969). "New Techniques for Finding Solutions and Error Bounds in Signal Detection and Estimation Problems." Report RM-6089-PR. Santa Monica, CA: The RAND Corporation.
- Pierre, Percy A. (1969). "Characterization of Gaussian Random Processes in Terms of Independent Random Variables." IEEE Transactions on Information Theory IT-15 (6): 648–658.
- Pierre, Percy A. (1969). "The Sample Function Regularity of Linear Random Processes." SIAM Journal on Applied Mathematics 17 (6): 1070–1077.
- Pierre, Percy A. (1970). "Asymptotic Eigenfunctions of Covariance Kernels with Rational Spectral Densities." IEEE Transactions on Information Theory IT-16: 346–347.
- Pierre, Percy A. (1970). "On the Convergence of Error Probabilities for Signal Detection." Information and Control 17: 10–13.
- Pierre, Percy A. (1971). "Infinitely Divisible Distributions, Conditions for Independence, and Central Limit Theorems." Journal of Mathematical Analysis and Applications 33: 341–354.
- Pierre, Percy A. (1971). "The Quadratic Variation of Random Processes." Zeitschrift für Wahrscheinlichkeitstheorie und Verwandte Gebiete 19: 291–301.
- Pierre, Percy A. (1971). "Central Limit Theorems for Conditionally Linear Random Processes." SIAM Journal on Applied Mathematics 20: 449–461.

=== Engineering education and policy ===
- Pierre, Percy A. (1972). "1973 Minorities in engineering." In: Minorities in Engineering, Proceedings of a Meeting of the Engineering Manpower Commission of Engineers Joint Council, November 30, 1972. New York: Engineers Joint Council.
- Pierre, Percy A. (1975). "Keynote address: Minority program directors' workshop." In: Proceedings of a Workshop for Program Directors in Engineering Education of Minorities. Washington, DC: The National Academies Press.
- Pierre, Percy A. (2015). "A brief history of the collaborative minority engineering effort: A personal account." In: Changing the Face of Engineering: The African American Experience, 13–36. Slaughter JB, Tao Y, Pearson W Jr, eds. Baltimore: Johns Hopkins University Press.
- Pierre, Percy A., and Catherine Weinberger (2024). "The 50-Year History of the Minority Engineering Effort: How the Engineering Profession Sparked the Movement to Diversify Its Workforce." The Bridge, National Academy of Engineering.

Political offices
Preceded by Clifford Alexander Jr.	Acting United States Secretary of the Army; January 21–29, 1981	Succeeded by John Otho Marsh Jr.
