= Mark C. Alexander =

American lawyer

- Education: Yale University (BA, JD)
- Political party: Democratic

Mark C. Alexander is an American attorney, law professor, and educator who is the dean of the Villanova University Charles Widger School of Law. He was previously an associate dean for academics and law professor at Seton Hall University in New Jersey, as well as a political activist and campaign specialist.

Beginning in January 2007, Alexander served as a senior advisor to Barack Obama's presidential campaign. Early on, Alexander served as policy director, building Obama's network of policy experts and providing overall strategic guidance. As New Jersey state director in the primaries, Alexander ran all campaign operations in his home state. After the election, he served on the presidential transition team.

== Early life and education ==
Alexander is the son of Adele (Logan), an historian, and attorney Clifford Alexander Jr.(1933-2022) His family moved from New York City to Washington, D.C., when his father began public service during the Kennedy administration. His father also served under President Lyndon B. Johnson, and was appointed by the Carter administration as the first African American Secretary of the Army. Mark has an older sister Elizabeth, who became a poet and professor at Yale University.

Alexander graduated from Yale University and Yale Law School.

== Career ==
He became active in Democratic politics. He has worked for U.S. Senators Edward Kennedy and Howard Metzenbaum. In 1999–2000, Alexander served as Issues Director for the Bill Bradley for President Campaign. He was General Counsel to Cory Booker in the 2006 Newark Municipal elections and for Booker's transition team after his election as mayor. He also served as a law professor at Seton Hall University.

In 2010, President Barack Obama appointed Alexander to the 12-member J. William Fulbright Foreign Scholarship Board established by Congress to supervise the global Fulbright Program.

In 2013, Alexander unsuccessfully challenged incumbent Nia Gill in the Democratic primary for the state senate position in New Jersey's 34th Legislative District.

Alexander was a longtime resident of Montclair, NJ.

In July 2016, he became Arthur J. Kania Dean and Professor of Law of the Villanova University School of Law.
