= Vestbirk Højskole =

Folk high school in Vestbirk, Denmark

Coordinates: 55°57′55″N 9°43′09″E

Vestbirk Folk High School
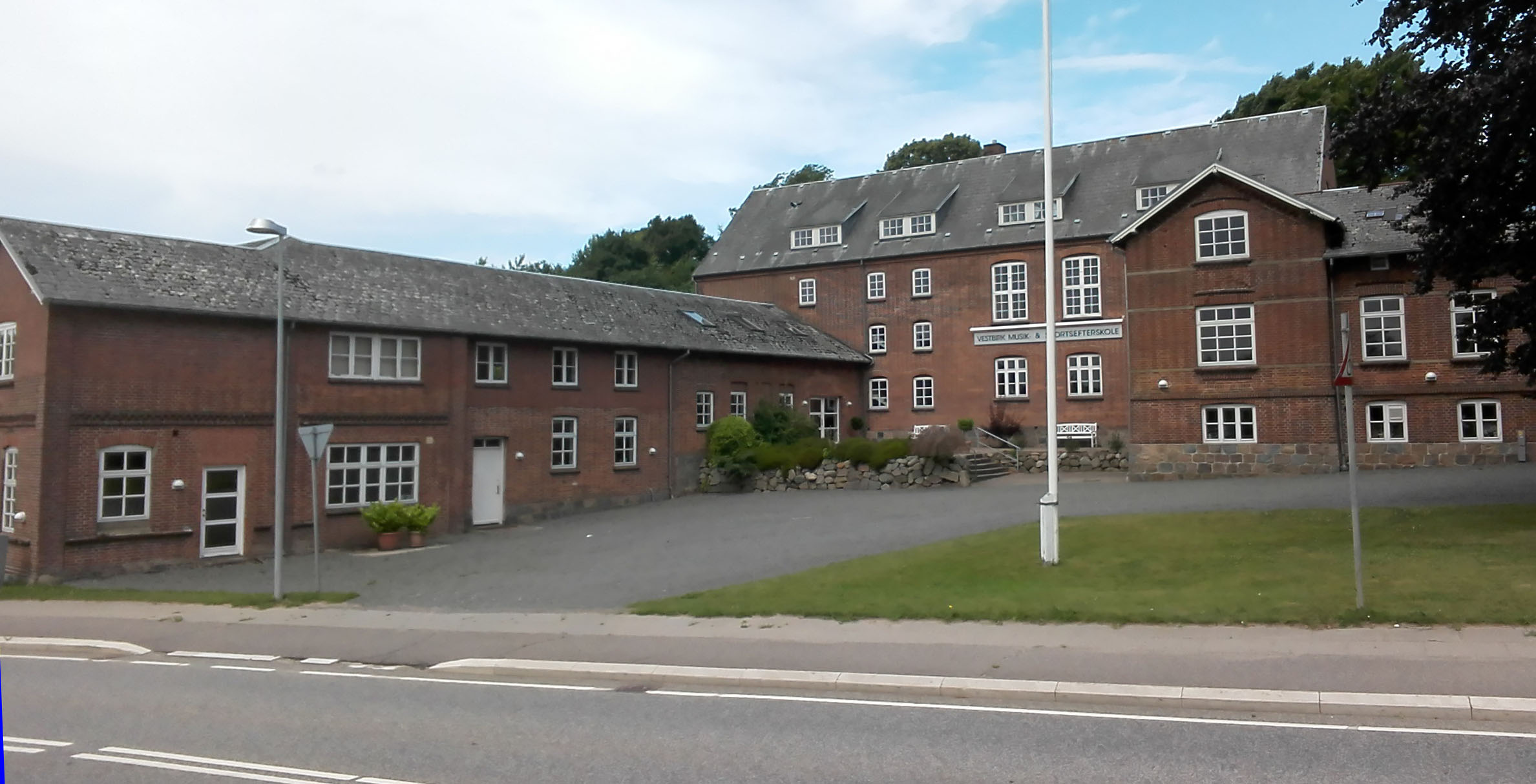
- Buildings formerly housing Vestbirk Højskole, currently used by Vestbirk Music & Sports Efterskole
- Type: Folkehøjskole
- Active: 1884–2006
- Location: Vestbirk, Denmark

Vestbirk Højskole was a folk high school in the village of Vestbirk in Horsens Kommune from 1884 to 2006. Since its closure, the buildings have been used by the Vestbirk Musik- & Sportsefterskole (Vestbirk Music and Sports Efterskole).

== History ==
The school was founded by local residents in 1884 as a aktieselskab. It opened on January 15 with 13 students from the area.

The original floor plan for the main building was designed to resemble Thor's hammer at the request of Grønvald Nielsen, a teacher at the time. He felt it was important that the architecture reflected the Danish connection to "the nordic spirit". Over time, several remodels and additions have been make, including several by former student and local architect Anton Hansen, who had been involved since the beginning of the project.

The school grew steadily after Grønvald Nielsen took over leadership in 1886, and by the beginning of the 20th century it was among the three largest folk high schools in the country. Nielsen further expanded the school to include an artisan department. Together with his colleague H. Nutzhorn from Askov Højskole, he collected many songs from various folk high schools and produced the Folkehøjskolens Sangbog.

In 1949 the school became Denmark's first folk high school to offer a music program. It offered courses in many genres, such as rock, jazz, soul/funk, electronic music, songwriting, world music, classical music history, and folk music.

=== Closure ===
Due to financial problems the school closed on September 29, 2006, after 122 years. At the time of its closing, 35 students were enrolled. They chose to continue their studies at Ry Højskole, where some of the teachers from Vestbirk Højskole had been hired.

The Vestbirk Music and Sports Efterskole bought the building in 2007 for 25 million Danish krones, and the facilities continue to be used for teaching and housing students.

== Grønvald Nielsen's memorial stone ==
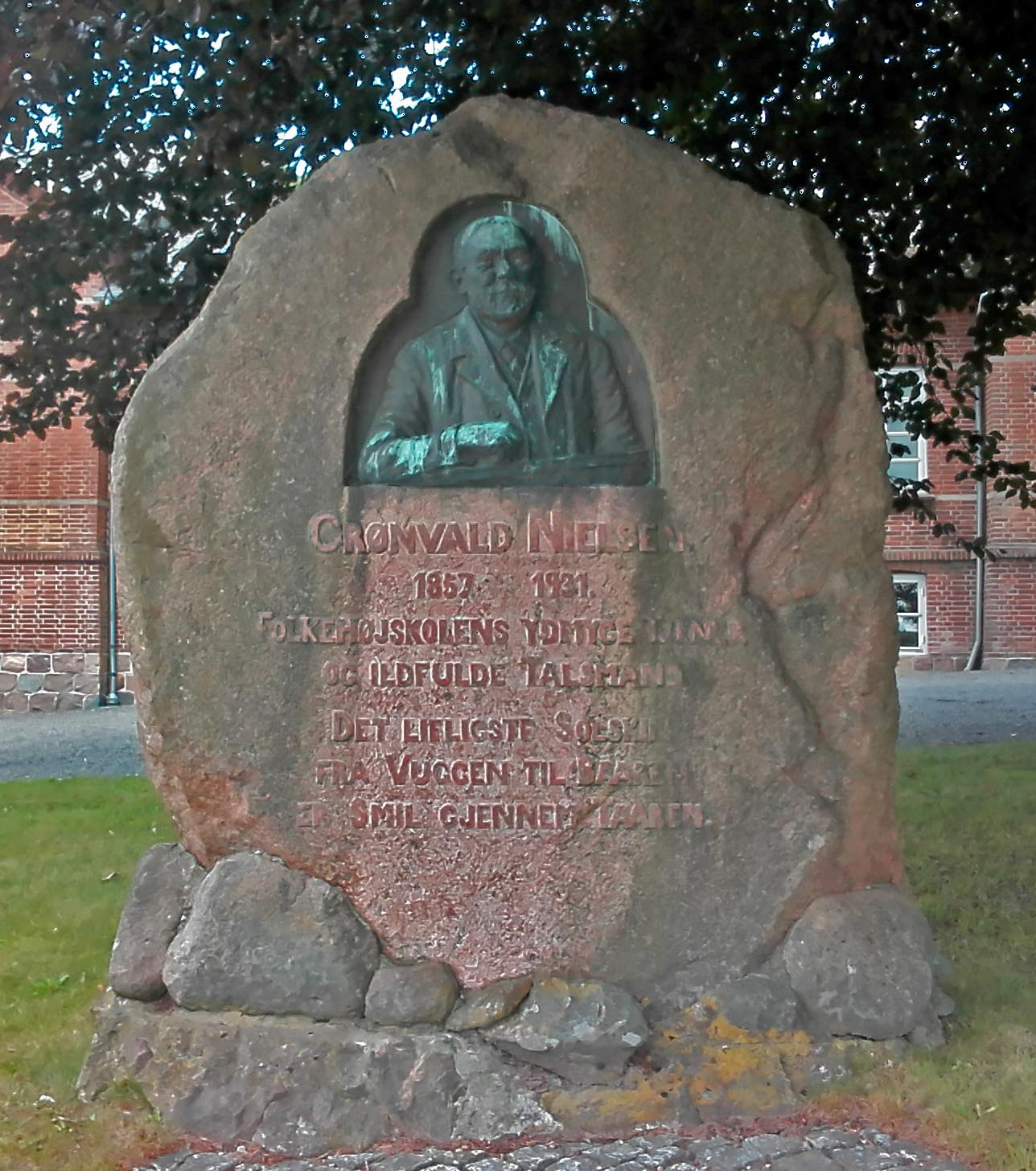

In front of the school's buildings and facing Vestbirkvej, a memorial stone has been erected with a bronze relief portrait of Grønvald Nielsen. The artist Hansen Jacobsen has depicted Grønvald Nielsen standing with one arm resting on a pulpit and a gentle and smiling face. It gives the impression that he was an avid speaker and discusser who had a friendly and welcoming demeanor . The memorial stone was unveiled in 1932 and cost 2,500 Danish krones. The inscription reads:

FOLKEHØJSKOLENS YDMYGE TJENER
OG ILDFULDE TALSMAND
DET LIFLIGSTE SOLSKIN
FRA VUGGEN TIL BAAREN
ER SMIL GJENNEM TAAREN

Translation:

THE FOLK HIGH SCHOOL'S HUMBLE SERVANT
AND FIERY SPEAKER
THE SWEETEST SUNSHINE
FROM THE CRADLE TO THE STRETCHER
SMILE THROUGH THE TEARS

== Principals/Rectors ==
- 1884–1886: Laurids Johnsen Vesterdal
- 1886–1920: Niels Peter Grønvald Nielsen, a teacher since the school's establishment until his death in 1931
- 1920–1934: Kristen Nørgaard and Via Nørgaard
- 1934–1948: Frode Aagaard and Marie Schøler Aagaard
- 1948–1949: Erik Dahlerup Pedersen and Elin Appel
- 1949–1963: Siliam Bjerre and Ingeborg Bjerre
- 1963–1973: Keld Friis and Ella Friis
- 1973–2003: Jens Grøn and Annelise Grøn, employed as teachers in 1969 and 1971 respectively
- 1992–1993 (acting): Torben Rasmussen
- 2003–2005: Ole Kobbelgaard
- 2005–2006: Lene Rikke Bresson

== Alumni ==
- Annika Aakjær
- Frederik Schnoor
- Per Fly
- Thomas Buttenschøn
- Villy Søvndal
