= Welcome, Louisiana =

- Unincorporated community Census designated place
- Location within Louisiana Location within the United States
- Coordinates: 30°03′34″N 90°52′06″W
- Country: United States
- State: Louisiana
- Parish: St. James

Area
  - Total: 5.12 sq mi (13.27 km^{2})
  - Land: 4.54 sq mi (11.75 km^{2})
  - Water: 0.59 sq mi (1.52 km^{2})
- Elevation: 20 ft (6.1 m)

Population (2020)
  - Total: 672
  - Density: 148.1/sq mi (57.17/km^{2})
- Time zone: UTC-6 (Central (CST))
  - Summer (DST): UTC-5 (CDT)
- Area code: 225
- GNIS feature ID: 1628458

Welcome is an unincorporated community and census-designated place in St. James Parish, Louisiana, United States. As of the 2020 census, Welcome had a population of 672. The community is located along Louisiana Highway 18 on the west bank of the Mississippi River.

== Geography ==
Welcome is located at 30.0593673°N 90.8684290°W. According to the U.S. Census Bureau, the community has an area of 5.123 square miles (13.27 km^{2}); 4.538 square miles (11.75 km^{2}) of its area is land, and 0.585 square miles (1.52 km^{2}) is water.

== Demographics ==
Historical population
| Census | Pop. | Note | %± |
|---|---|---|---|
| 2010 | 800 | | — |
| 2020 | 672 | | −16.0% |
U.S. Decennial Census

Welcome first appeared as a census designated place in the 2010 U.S. census.

Welcome CDP, Louisiana – Racial and ethnic composition Note: the US Census treats Hispanic/Latino as an ethnic category. This table excludes Latinos from the racial categories and assigns them to a separate category. Hispanics/Latinos may be of any race.
| Race / Ethnicity (NH = Non-Hispanic) | Pop 2010 | Pop 2020 | % 2010 | % 2020 |
|---|---|---|---|---|
| White alone (NH) | 32 | 27 | 4.00% | 4.02% |
| Black or African American alone (NH) | 755 | 629 | 94.38% | 93.60% |
| Native American or Alaska Native alone (NH) | 7 | 1 | 0.88% | 0.15% |
| Asian alone (NH) | 0 | 0 | 0.00% | 0.00% |
| Native Hawaiian or Pacific Islander alone (NH) | 0 | 0 | 0.00% | 0.00% |
| Other race alone (NH) | 0 | 0 | 0.00% | 0.00% |
| Mixed race or Multiracial (NH) | 6 | 8 | 0.75% | 1.19% |
| Hispanic or Latino (any race) | 0 | 7 | 0.00% | 1.04% |
| Total | 800 | 672 | 100.00% | 100.00% |

It first appeared in the 2010 census with a population of 800. In 2020, its population was 672.

== Notable person ==
- Percy A. Pierre, American electrical engineer and mathematician, was born in Welcome; he served as assistant secretary for research and regulation in the United States Department of the Army.
