= David James Davies =

Welsh economist, activist and pilot

D. J. Davies
- Born: David James Davies; 2 June 1893; Carmel, Carmarthenshire, Wales
- Died: 11 October 1956 (aged 63)
- Resting place: Carmel, Carmarthenshire, Wales
- Education: Aberystwyth University, Seattle University, Colorado State University Pueblo
- Occupations: Economist; essayist; author; industrialist; engineer; pilot; collier
- Employer(s): Northwestern Coal and Coke Co., United States Navy, Collierycollier
- Known for: Influential essayist and economist
- Spouse: Noëlle Ffrench
- Parent(s): Thomas Davies and Ellen (née Williams)

David James Davies (1893–1956), known as D. J. Davies, was a Welsh economist, industrialist, essayist, author, political activist, pilot, and an internationalist. Davies was a world traveller before returning home to Wales.

Initially a founding member of the Welsh Labour Party in the Ammanford district, in 1925 he left Labour becoming a founding member of Plaid Cymru, the nationalist party of Wales.

According to the historian John Davies, it was D. J. Davies' ideas which were more influential in shaping long-term Plaid Cymru ideology following the Second World War, and Davies was as "equally [a] significant figure" as Saunders Lewis in Welsh nationalism history, but it was Lewis' "brilliance and charismatic appeal" which was firmly associated with Plaid Genedlaethol Cymru of the 1930s.

== Early life ==
D. J. Davies was born the third child of Thomas Davies, a miner, and Ellen Davies (née Williams) in Carmel, Carmarthenshire, Wales, on 2 June 1893. After attending local schools, Davies began working at age 14 in several collieries and at Barry Docks. Though working long hours, Davies continued his education by taking evening classes and through correspondence courses.

== World traveller ==
In 1912 Davies emigrated to Canada and then to the United States where he worked in mines. Davies was a co-founder of the Northwestern Coal and Coke Company in Steamboat Springs, Colorado. "A colourful figure," wrote professor John Davies, D. J. Davies travelled throughout the United States, became a boxer, attended Colorado State University Pueblo, and then studied law at Seattle University in Washington.

Following his studies, Davies travelled to Asia, spending time in Japan and China before returning to the US and joining the United States Navy as an engineer and pilot in 1918. Davies' membership in the US military, rather than the British military, was "a protest against the class bound attitudes of the officers of the British Army," according to professor John Davies.

While on leave from the US Navy in 1919, Davies returned to Wales and worked as a collier in Llandybïe, until he was seriously injured in an accident. By 1920 Davies was discharged from the US Navy following his incapacitation the following year.

== Political activist ==
During his "enforced leisure" resulting from the accident, wrote Dr. Ceinwen Hannah Thomas, Davies studied "economics, politics and the history of the Working Class Movement". Stirred into socialist political activism, Davies became a founding member of the Labour Party in the Ammanford district of Carmarthenshire.

In 1924 Davies travelled to Denmark to attend the International People's College in Elsinore, and a Folk High School in Vestbirk, where "[Davies'] attitude towards the relationship between socialism and nationalism changed completely", according to Dr. Thomas.

"[Davies] came to believe that true internationalism was based on co-operation between free nations, while the advancement of the Welsh working class could only be secured in a free Wales. This point of view was expressed months before the Welsh Nationalist Party (now Plaid Cymru) was founded in 1925, while he was unaware of the existence of a nationalist movement in Wales. He returned from Denmark a convinced nationalist in favour of an economic policy of co-operation which placed ownership and control of the means of production in the hands of the workers themselves".- Dr. Ceinwen Hannah Thomas

Of Davies' experience in Denmark, author Siôn T. Jobbins wrote "Impressed by that little country's ability to govern itself, the one-time member of the Independent Labour Party returned to Wales in 1924 a Welsh nationalist".

Inspired by the Folk High Schools of Denmark, Davies and his new Irish bride Noëlle Ffrench, whom he had met at the International People's College, moved to Ireland to establish a Folk High School there.

However, by 1925 their attempt proved unsuccessful, and the couple moved to Aberystwyth where Davies attended the Aberystwyth University, then known as University College of Wales (UCW). Also that year, Davies resigned from the Labour Party and became a founding member of the newly formed Plaid Genedlaethol Cymru, later known as Plaid Cymru; the Party of Wales.

Davies graduated from UCW, Aberystwyth, with his Bachelor of Arts in economics in 1928, a Master of Arts in 1930, and a Doctor of Philosophy in 1931. Davies won consecutive awards at the National Eisteddfod of Wales in 1930, 1931, 1932, and 1934 on essays on economics and politics. Davies' economic essays were particularly inspired by US President Franklin D. Roosevelt's New Deal, "and year in year out the model he offered for the regeneration of depression-ridden Wales was the work of the Tennessee Valley Authority", according to Dr. Davies.

In 1932, Davies and his wife again attempted to establish a Folk School in the Danish tradition, and bought the Pantybeilïau mansion at Gilwern in Monmouthshire. However this attempt also proved ultimately unsuccessful.

Davies increased his participation within Plaid Cymru, contributing as an economic and political researcher, author of pamphlets and articles in the movement's publications, as well as writing articles in other mainstream Welsh and English language publications.

However Davies and other leftist members of Plaid Cymru were increasingly disaffected by Plaid president Saunders Lewis. Davies objected to Lewis' economic policies, Lewis' rejection of capitalism and socialism, and at the party conference in 1938, Davies and other leftist members firmly rejected Lewis' concept of "perchentyaeth"; a policy of 'distributing property among the masses'. Additionally, Davies and many leftest Plaid members were deeply offended by the "readiness of prominent party members [such as Lewis] to see virtue in Mussolini and Franco". In 1939 Lewis resigned as Plaid Cymru president citing that Wales was not ready to accept the leadership of a Roman Catholic.

Davies argued in favour of engaging English-speaking Welsh communities, and stressed the territorial integrity of Wales. Davies pointed towards Scandinavian countries as a model to emulate, and was active in the economic implications of Welsh self-government.

In 1953, one-time republican Davies wrote an article in Y Faner publication strongly endorsing a Welsh constitutional monarch. Posthumously published in English in his book Towards Welsh Freedom in 1958, Davies advocated that an independent Wales would be better served by a Welsh constitutional monarchy, one which would engender the affection and allegiance of the Welsh people and legitimise Welsh sovereignty.

An hereditary constitutional monarch would, he argued, embody and personify a Welsh national identity above party politics, while political parties formed governments in a parliamentary system similar to those of Denmark, Norway, or the Netherlands. Davies advocated for the elevation of a native Welsh gentry family, rather than inviting a foreign prince to the throne of Wales. Among the criteria for consideration, argued Davies, was that the family had to have a history of contributing to Welsh life and reside in Wales.

In the 1950s, Davies and his wife Noëlle became deeply concerned over the dispute concerning the legal status of Monmouthshire, which some considered part of Wales while others considered part of England. "They lost no opportunity in demonstrating that it had always been an integral part of Wales," wrote Dr. Thomas.

== Death ==
D. J. Davies died on 11 October 1956 and was buried in Carmel graveyard in Carmarthenshire.

== Essays and bibliography ==
=== Selected essays ===
- The economic history of South Wales prior to 1800 (written in 1933)
- Can Wales afford self-government? (with Noëlle Ffrench Davies, 1938 and in 1947)
- Cymoedd tan gwmwl (with Noëlle Ffrench Davies, 1938)
- Diwydiant a masnach (1946)
- Wales Must Have a Monarchy (1953, 1958)

=== Selected bibliography ===
- Towards Welsh Freedom (1958)
