= Louis T. Wright =

American surgeon and civil rights activist (1891–1952)

Louis Wright
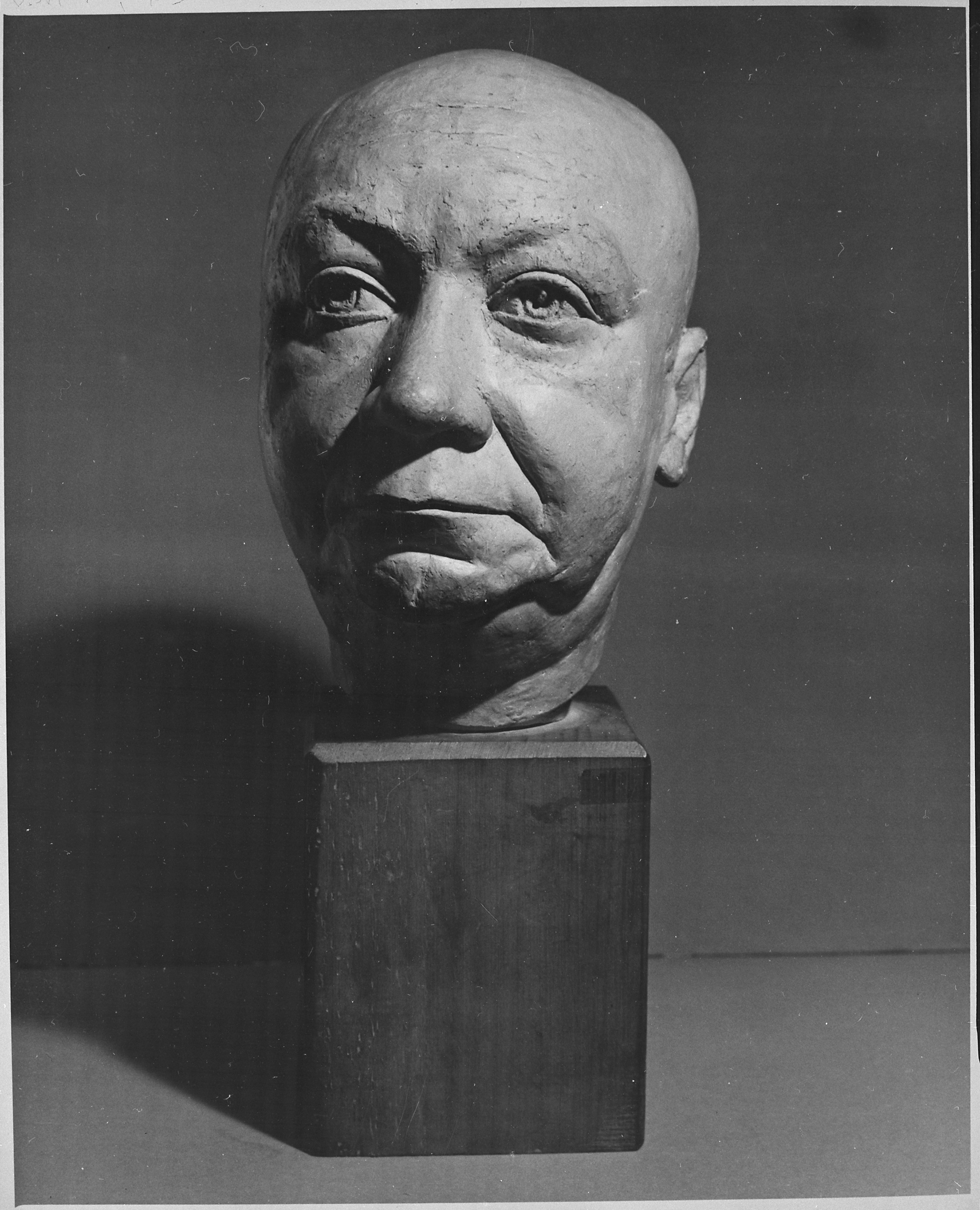
- Sculpture of Wright by William E. Artis

Chair of the National Association for the Advancement of Colored People
- In office 1934–1952
- Preceded by: Mary White Ovington
- Succeeded by: Channing Heggie Tobias

Personal details
- Born: Oswald Garrison Villard; July 23, 1891 LaGrange, Georgia, U.S.
- Died: October 8, 1952 (aged 61) New York City, New York, U.S.
- Education: Atlanta University (BS); Harvard University (MD)
- Civilian awards: Spingarn Medal
- Military awards: Purple Heart

Louis Tompkins Wright (July 23, 1891 – October 8, 1952) was an American surgeon and civil rights activist. In his position at Harlem Hospital he was the first African-American on the surgical staff of a non-segregated hospital in New York City. He was influential for his medical research as well as his efforts pushing for racial equality in medicine and involvement with the National Association for the Advancement of Colored People (NAACP), which he served as chairman for nearly two decades.

== Early life and family ==
Wright was born in LaGrange, Georgia. His father, Ceah Ketchan Wright, was born enslaved but obtained formal education, finishing medical school as valedictorian but later giving up his medical practice to be a Methodist minister. Ceah died shortly after Louis's birth and his mother, a sewing teacher named Lula Tompkins, remarried in 1899. Also a physician, Louis's step-father, William Fletcher Penn, was the first African-American to graduate from Yale School of Medicine. Penn, who became a prominent doctor in Atlanta and was the first African-American to own an automobile in the city, had a strong influence on Louis both as a physician and through the racism Louis watched him endure.

Wright graduated from Clark Atlanta University in 1911 and received his medical degree from Harvard Medical School in 1915, finishing fourth in his class. Wright's admission to Harvard Medical School must be recognized as no easy feat. Despite being a very educated individual, Wright was deemed unfit by Channing Frothingham, MD––one of the medical school's interviewers––due to his attendance of an undergraduate institution that permitted blacks. However, after subjecting Wright to numerous tests, Frothingham ultimately ruled that he had "adequate chemistry for admission to this school." He completed his postgraduate work at Howard University-affiliated Freedmen's Hospital in Washington, DC before returning to Georgia.

He married public school teacher Corinne Cooke, and the couple had two daughters, Jane Cooke Wright and Barbara Wright Pierce, both of whom also became physicians and researchers.

== Medical career ==
Shortly after completing medical school and moving back to Georgia, Wright joined the Army Medical Corps, serving as a lieutenant during World War I, stationed in France. While there he introduced intradermal vaccination for smallpox and was awarded the Purple Heart after a gas attack.

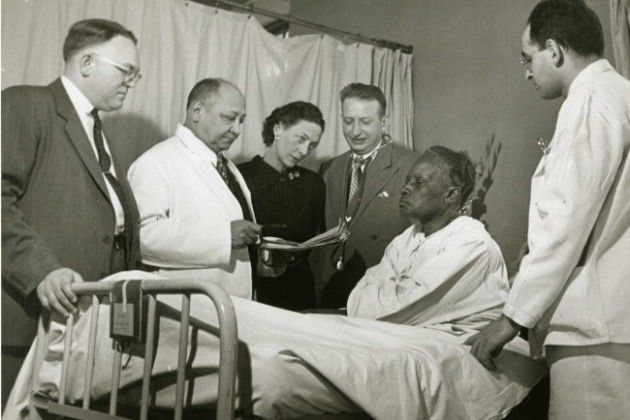
Louis T. Wright and colleagues at patient bedside, Harlem Hospital, New York, N.Y. From left to right: Dr. Lyndon M. Hill, Dr. Louis T. Wright, Dr. Myra Logan, Dr. Aaron Prigot, unidentified African American woman patient, and unidentified hospital employee.

Upon returning to the United States in 1919, he moved to New York amid racial tensions in Georgia to set up a private practice in Harlem and established ties to the Harlem Hospital, where he was the first African-American on the surgical staff. Dr. Wright's implementations at Harlem Hospital were incredibly significant. He addressed the institution's issues of professionalism and quality of standards, and made the appropriate changes. Wright's additions gained the attention of the nation, and his revisions were eventually implemented into many hospitals nationwide. In 1929 he was also appointed to serve as the first African-American police surgeon with the New York Police Department. In his thirty years at the hospital he started the Harlem Hospital Bulletin, headed the team that first used chlortetracycline on humans, founded the hospital's cancer research center, and earned a reputation as an expert on head injuries. He was a Fellow of the American College of Surgeons and the American Medical Association.

== Civil rights activism and leadership ==
Throughout his life Wright involved himself in civil rights efforts, beginning in college when he missed three weeks of school to join picket lines protesting D. W. Griffith's The Birth of a Nation, a film controversial for its sympathetic portrayal of the Ku Klux Klan. At Harvard he insisted on equal treatment when a professor prevented him from delivering white patients' babies. He joined the NAACP after medical school and remained involved with the organization for the rest of his life, eventually serving as chairman of its national board of directors from 1933 until his death in 1952.

Wright's work at the NAACP did not go unnoticed. For the better part of a decade, he wrote multiple columns in The Crisis, the NAACP's magazine. The majority of Wright's work dealt with issues that are still brought up by modern black authors, such as Harriet A. Washington. Wright challenged the false beliefs that because of their biology, black people are more susceptible to infectious diseases—such as syphilis—than other races.

He was a frequent leader in the struggle for integration, especially in medicine. In 1920, early in his tenure at Harlem Hospital, he played a key role in fighting the precedent in New York whereby African-American doctors and nurses were barred from serving in municipal hospitals. He actively opposed segregated hospitals, including a successful effort in 1930 to stop the construction of a new such facility proposed by the Rosenwald Fund. In working towards equality in medicine and medical education, he advocated for raising standards for black medical students, leading to some pushback from peers who had become used to having a different set of requirements.

In 1940 he was the recipient of the Spingarn Medal for "his contribution to the healing of mankind and for his courageous position in the face of bitter attack."

There is no such thing as Negro health ... the health of the American Negro is not a separate racial problem to be met by special segregated setups or dealt with on a dual standard basis, but is an American problem which should be adequately and equitably handled by the identical agencies and met with the identical methods that deal with the health of the remainder of the population.

— Louis T. Wright, Address at the 1938 National Health Conference

== Death and legacy ==
Wright had chronic health problems following his war service and was hospitalized for tuberculosis from 1939 to 1942. Though he returned to medicine thereafter and was appointed chief of surgery in 1943, he never fully recovered and died in 1952 at the age of 61.

Throughout his career Wright published research extensively and his research proved influential in a number of areas including antibiotic treatment, cancer research, chemotherapy, treating head injuries, and treating bone fractures.

The Harlem Hospital library was renamed in his honor just before he died.

"What the Negro physician needs is equal opportunity for training and practice—no more, nor less."

— Louis T. Wright

== Fictional portrayals ==
Wright is the inspiration for the character Algernon Edwards, played by actor Andre Holland, in the Cinemax television drama series The Knick. Edwards, like Wright, graduated at the top of his class at Harvard Medical School and serves as the first African-American surgeon at the fictionalized Knickerbocker Hospital in Manhattan. Whereas the Harlem Hospital consisted a previously all-white surgical staff serving primarily African-American patients, the hospital in The Knick is an all-white surgical staff serving primarily white patients. While Edwards, active two decades prior to Wright, was not involved in broad-scale civil rights activism, the racial injustice he and others contended with is a major theme of the show.

== See also ==
- List of people from Harlem
