= Vestbirk =

Coordinates: 55°57′54″N 9°43′05″E

- Village
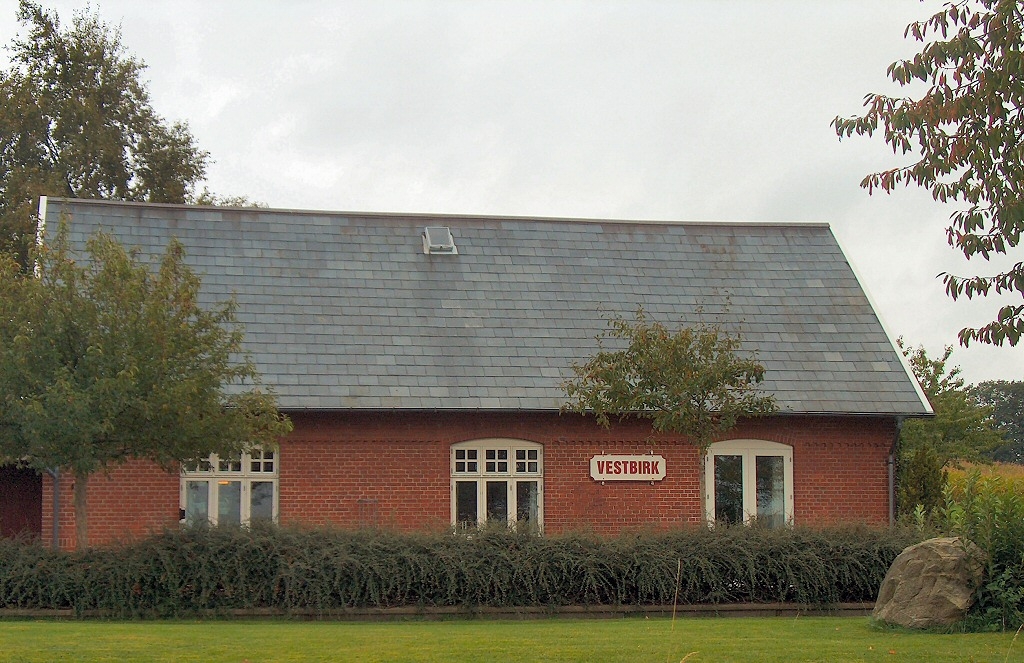
- Vestbirk station
- Interactive map of Vestbirk
- Country: Denmark
- Region: Central Denmark Region
- Municipality: Horsens Municipality
- Time zone: UTC +1
- Postal code: 8752

Vestbirk is a village in Horsens Municipality, Denmark. The area is characterized by the Gudenå river and its lakes which are popular destinations for local fishermen and tourists. The village of Vestbirk was originally formed as a farming community, and its population has been in decline.

== Geography ==
Vestbirk is located 8 km southwest of one of Denmark's highest points, Yding Skovhøj which has an elevation of 172.54 meters.

The landscape bears clear signs of the ice age with large meadows formed by glacial meltwater. At the bottom of the glacier valleys lies the Gudenå river.

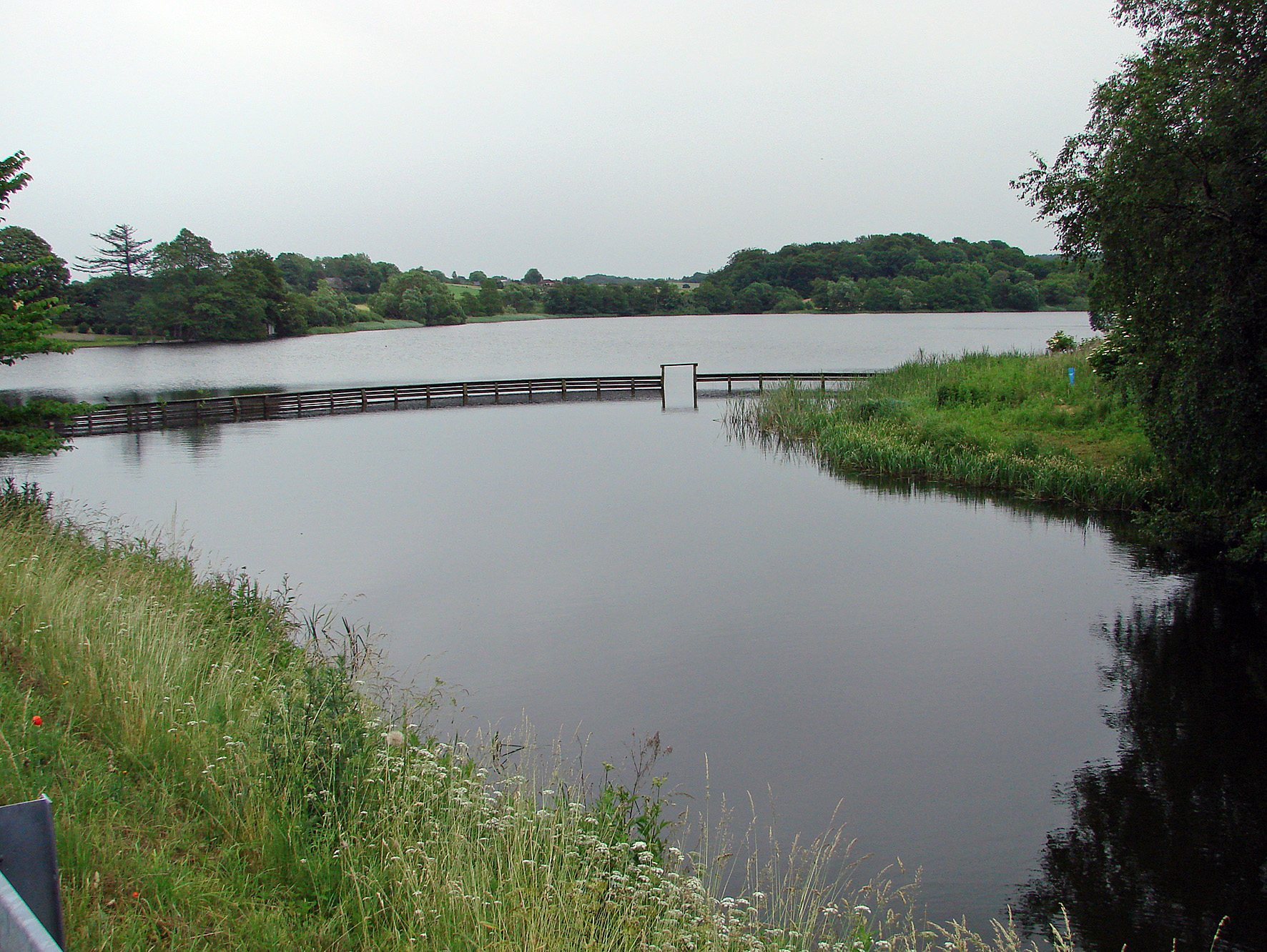
Vestbirk Lake

Three lakes have been artificially created in Vestbirk as a result of damming up the Gudenå river: Bredvad Lake, Naldal Lake and Vestbirk Lake. They were formed between 1922 and 1924 when Vestbirk Vandkraftværk, a hydroelectric power plant, was built. The facilities and surrounding lakes have been public property since 1979. Today, the power plant operates as a working museum and generates 2 GWh annually.

== History ==
In 1682, Vestbirk and its surrounding area was mostly grassland used as pasture by a total of 13 farms. The total area cultivated was 451.9 barrels of land which was valued at 52.92 barrels of barley grain.

The Horsens-Bryrup-Silkeborg Railway (HBS) opened in 1899 with a railway stop near Vestbirk. The railway was eventually purchased by the state and converted from a narrow-gauge private railway into a public narrow-gauge private railway. The stop originally had an enclosure for pigs, but reopened as a fully fledged station in 1913.

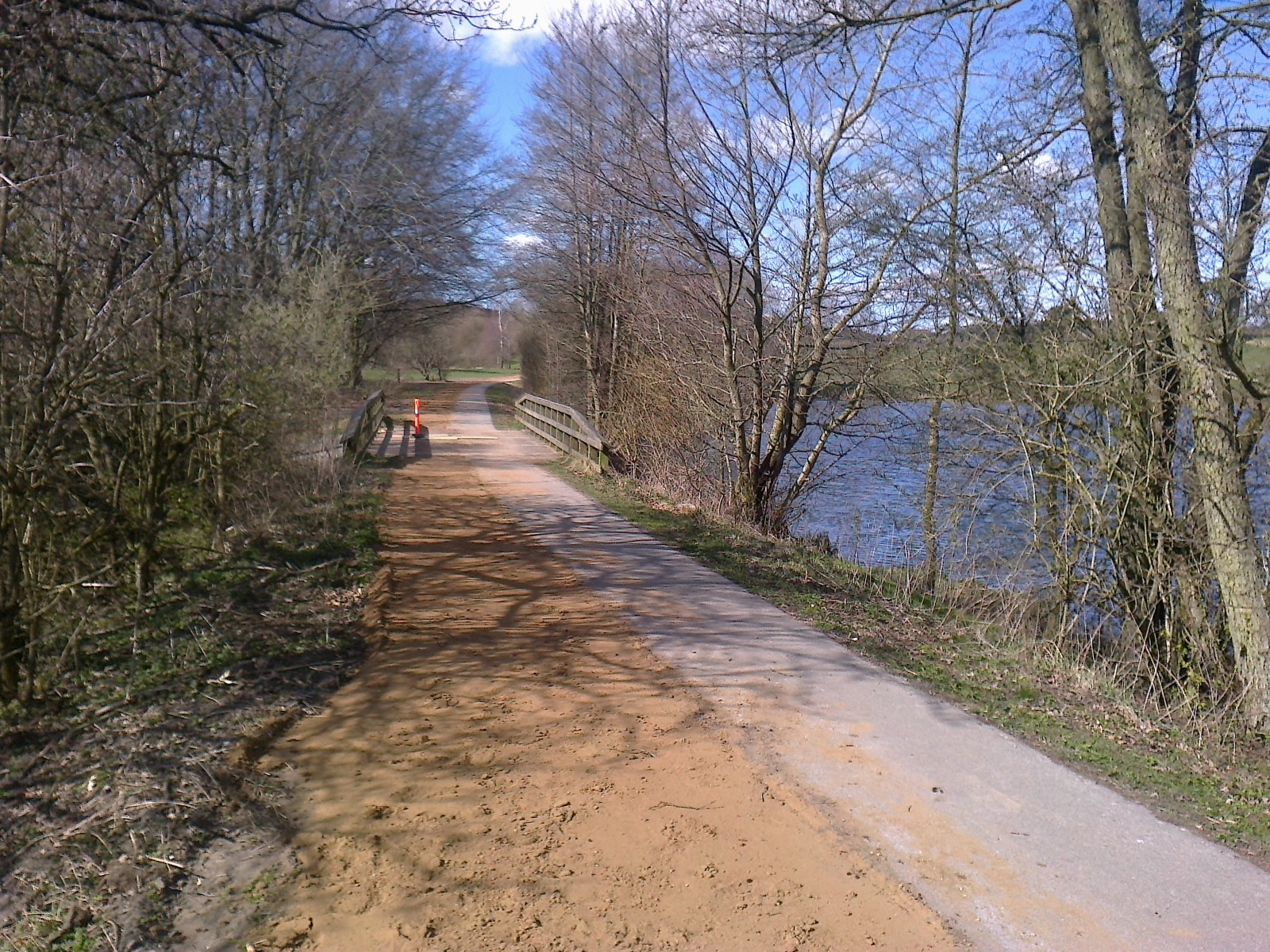
The nature pathway along Naldal Lake. Sand is laid on the left side of the trail as a horse path.

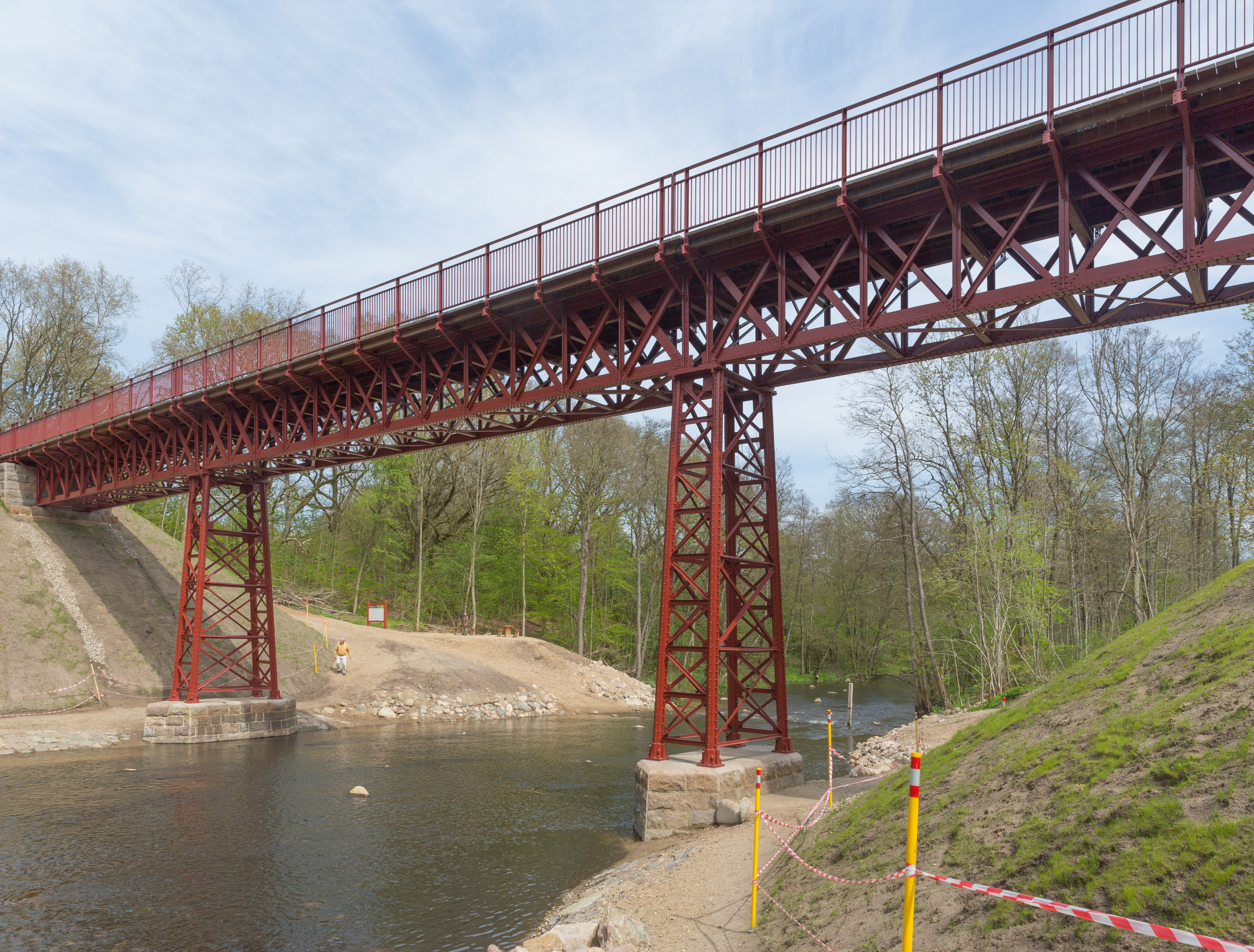
Den Genfundne Bro

After cars made the track obsolete, the station was closed on 30 March 1968. A nature trail between Horsens and Silkeborg was built over the old railbed with over 60 kilometers of walking, cycling, and riding paths. A bridge along the trail, Den Genfundne Bro, is popular with tourists.

The Vestbirk Yarn and Knitwear Factory (Vestbirk Garn- og Trikotagefabrik) was built alongside the Gudenå river in 1852 by Christian Fischer. The factory was the first to use hydropower along the Gudenå river. The factory burnt down in 1920 and Vestbirk Vandkraftværk built on the former site. The new hydroelectric power plant formed the Vestbirk lakes.

== Community ==
The population of Vestbirk has been in decline. In 1911, 344 people lived in Vestbirk; by 1916 the population had dropped to 248. In 1965, Vestbirk had a population of 212.

Vestbirk has several schools in the Grundtvigian tradition: Vestbirk Højskole (1884–2006), Vestbirk Friskole (est. 1892), and Vestbirk Music and Sports Efterskole (est. 1907).
