= Adella Hunt Logan =

American suffragist (1863–1915)

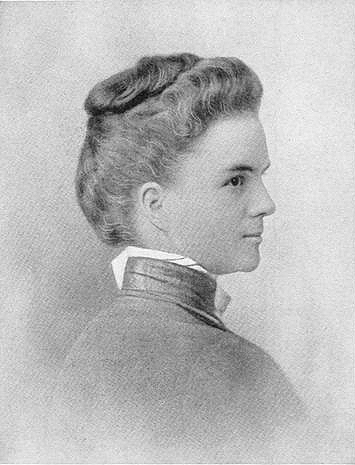
- Adella Hunt Logan, 1902
- Born: Adella Hunt; February 10, 1863; Sparta, Georgia, U.S.
- Died: December 10, 1915 (aged 52); Tuskegee, Alabama, U.S.
- Education: Atlanta University
- Occupations: Writer, educator

Adella Hunt Logan (February 10, 1863 – December 10, 1915) was an African-American writer, educator, administrator and suffragist. Born during the Civil War, she earned her teaching credentials at Atlanta University, an historically black college founded by the American Missionary Association. She became a teacher at the Tuskegee Institute and became an activist for education and suffrage for women of color. As part of her advocacy, she published articles in some of the most noted black periodicals of her time.

== Early life and education ==
Adella Hunt was born in 1863 in Sparta, Georgia, to parents Mariah Hunt, a free woman of color, and Henry Hunt, a plantation owner. She was their fourth of eight children. Her father provided her with an education at Bass Academy, and she became certified as a teacher at the age of 16. Hunt gained a scholarship to Atlanta University in Atlanta, Georgia, founded by the American Missionary Association (AMA) after the Civil War. There she attended the Upper Normal College, where she got a teacher's education and graduated in 1881 after completing the two-year program. Hunt spent two years teaching in Albany, Georgia, at an AMA primary school.

In 1883, Hunt was offered positions teaching at both Atlanta University and Booker T. Washington's Tuskegee Institute. She accepted the offer in Tuskegee and developed a close friendship with Washington. At Tuskegee, Hunt taught English and other subjects in the humanities and social sciences. She was the school's first librarian and served as the "Lady Principal" for a short time.

== Logan family ==
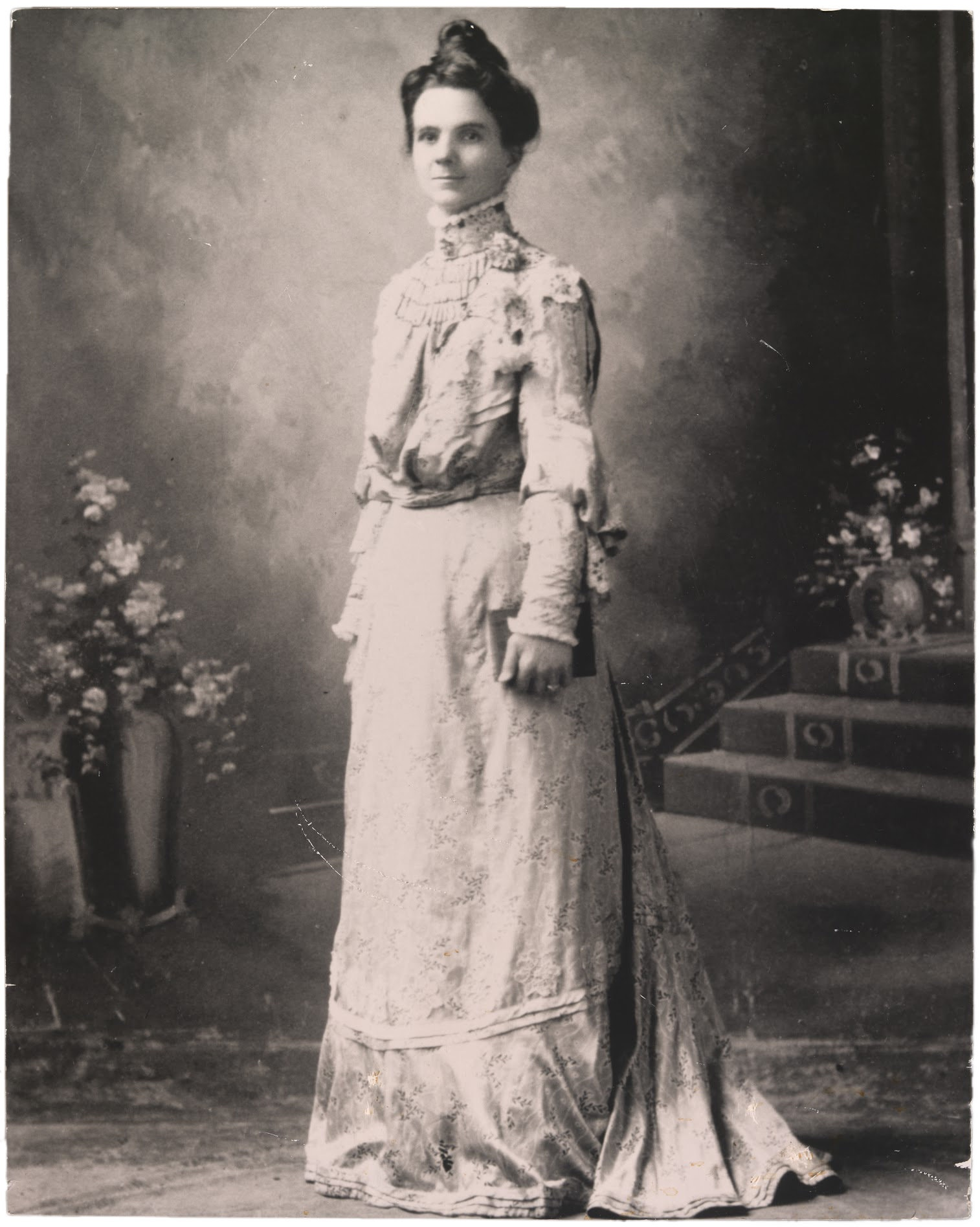
Adella Hunt Logan in her wedding dress in Atlanta in 1888

In 1888, she married Warren Logan, a fellow teacher at Tuskegee University. Of mixed-race, he was born into slavery in Virginia. He gained an education after emancipation and had started teaching a few years before she did. At Tuskegee, Logan became a friend of Booker T. Washington and served as treasurer of the institute. Between the years of 1890 and 1909, the couple had nine children, six of whom survived to adulthood. They encouraged them to become educated. The Logan couple established a family whose descendants have been highly educated and had successful professional careers.

Their youngest son became a surgeon in New York City. His children include historian Adele Logan Alexander, who got her doctorate in history, was a professor at George Washington University before retirement, and has written about African-American history.

== Activist work ==
Hunt Logan is best known for her activist work. Her main interest was education advocacy, seen especially in her work at Tuskegee. In 1895, Hunt Logan joined the Tuskegee Woman's Club, which became an affiliate of the National Association of Colored Women (NACW) a year later. The Tuskegee chapter worked to improve the lives of African Americans in local communities. Hunt Logan worked specifically in programs aimed to improve health care, as well as advocating for prison reform and running a lending library as a member of the NACW club.

One of Hunt Logan's educational goals was to prepare individuals for universal suffrage. In 1895 the National American Woman Suffrage Association (NAWSA) held a convention in Atlanta. Due to the difficulty NAWSA was having gaining passage for a constitutional amendment on women's suffrage, the organization was looking for support from southern states. Although NAWSA was appealed to white southerners, it observed state Jim Crow segregation and turned away African-American women and men from the convention. Mississippi had already passed a new constitution to disenfranchise blacks, and other southern states completed similar actions in this period, through 1908. This was the atmosphere in which Hunt Logan arrived at the convention. Hunt Logan was able to hear Susan B. Anthony speak, and despite the racism which she and other African Americans had to contend with at the convention, Hunt Logan became a member of the NAWSA after being inspired by Anthony's speech.

Hunt Logan campaigned for women's suffrage in Alabama and wrote for NAWSA's newspaper, The Woman's Journal. In September 1912, Hunt Logan contributed an article to the magazine of the National Association for the Advancement of Colored People (NAACP), The Crisis, as a part of a special issue on women's suffrage. (The NAACP was founded in 1909.) She argued for the right to vote, specifically for women of color. She pointed to the success of women's voting in many western states that had statewide suffrage and argued,

...the colored American believes in equal justice to all, regardless of race, color, creed or sex, and longs for the day when the United States shall indeed have a government of the people, for the people and by the people—even including the colored people.

Hunt Logan wrote many articles for The Crisis, as well as the Colored American magazine. In most of her arguments for universal suffrage, Hunt Logan returned to her roots in education. She argued that African-American women should be given the vote so that they would have a say in education legislation.

== Death and legacy ==
In September 1915, following troubles in her marriage and setbacks in the suffrage movement, Hunt Logan had an emotional breakdown. She was committed to a sanitarium in Michigan for treatment. After her close friend Booker T. Washington died in November 1915, Hunt Logan fell deeper into depression. On December 10, 1915, she committed suicide by jumping from the top floor of a building on the Tuskegee campus.

Five years after her death, the United States passed the Nineteenth Amendment, guaranteeing women the right to vote, effective in 1920. Hunt Logan had fought for this right for many years. Today she is taught in schools because of her influence, especially as an advocate for women's suffrage and women of color.
