= Myra Adele Logan =

American physician, surgeon and anatomist

- Myra Logan, at patient bedside, Harlem Hospital
- Born: 1908; Tuskegee, Alabama, US
- Died: January 13, 1977 (aged 68–69); New York City, US
- Education: New York Medical College; Columbia University (MS); Atlanta University (1927)
- Known for: First woman to perform open heart surgery
- Medical career
- Profession: Surgeon
- Institutions: Harlem Hospital; Sydenham Hospital

Myra Adele Logan (1908 – January 13, 1977) is known as the first African American female physician, surgeon, and anatomist to perform a successful open-heart surgery. Following this accomplishment, Logan focused her work on children's heart surgery and was involved in the development of the antibiotic Aureomycin which treated bacterial, viral, and rickettsial diseases with the majority of her medical practice done at the Harlem Hospital in New York. Logan attended medical school during the pre–Civil Rights era. The majority of black female physicians in this time period were forced to attend segregated schools.

Logan also worked with the NAACP, Planned Parenthood, and the New York State Commission on Discrimination.

== Personal life ==
=== Early life and education ===
Myra Adele Logan was born in Tuskegee, Alabama, in 1908, to Warren and Adella Hunt Logan. She was the youngest of eight children and sister to Arthur R. Logan. Her mother was college-educated and involved in the suffrage and health care movements. Her father was treasurer and trustee of Tuskegee Institute and the first staff member selected by Booker T. Washington. Logan's primary school education was at Tuskegee's Laboratory, the Children's House. After graduating with honors from Tuskegee High School, she attended a historically black college, Atlanta University, and graduated as valedictorian of her class in 1927. She moved to New York and attended Columbia University, where she earned her MS in psychology. She worked for the YWCA in Connecticut for some years before opting for a career in medicine. Logan won the first four-year $10,000 Walter Gray Crump Scholarship that was exclusively for aiding African-American medical students to attend New York Medical College. She graduated from medical school in 1933. She was the second female African American intern at Harlem Hospital in New York and did her surgery residency there.

While working at Harlem Hospital, Logan met painter Charles Alston, they married on April 8, 1944. Alston was working on a mural project at the hospital and he featured Logan as his model for work Modern Medicine. In the oil canvas painting, Logan appears as a nurse holding a baby. The project was intended to combine the fact of there being a lack of African American physicians during this time with the maternal gender role placed on women as well. Alston included her alongside Dr. Louis Wright who was the first African American physician at Harlem Hospital and Louis Pasteur in this work, showcasing the advancement of Western medicine with African American and Caucasian healthcare professionals working side by side.

That mural has been restored and can be viewed at the Harlem Hospital Gallery.

=== Later life ===
Outside of her career, Logan was a renowned classical pianist. After her retirement in 1970 and later served on the New York State Workmen's Compensation Board. On January 13, 1977, Logan died of lung cancer at Mount Sinai Hospital at the age of 68.

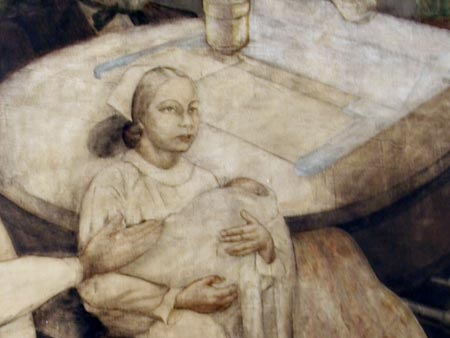
Detail of Charles Alston's Modern Medicine (oil on canvas) in Harlem Hospital, a mural commissioned in 1936 by the WPA. Logan was a medical intern at the hospital then and served as a model for the mural; she appears as a nurse holding a baby.

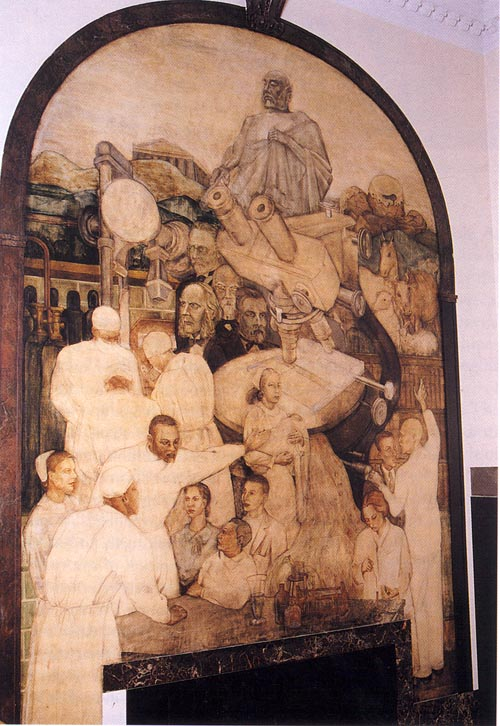

== Medical career ==
=== Surgery ===
Logan spent the majority of her career as an associate surgeon at the Harlem Hospital. She remained a surgeon past her term's completion. She was also a visiting surgeon at the Sydenham Hospital, and did all this while maintaining her own private practice. In 1943, Logan became the first woman to perform bypass surgery, an open-heart surgical procedure, which was the ninth of its kind in the world. This was when she began dedicating her career towards children's heart surgery alongside developing the antibiotic Aureomycin. In 1951, Logan was elected as a Fellow of the American College of Surgeons.

=== Antibiotic development ===
She worked with a team of doctors who effectively treated 25 lymphogranuloma venereum patients with the developed Aureomycin. After four days of Aureomycin treatment, the gland size of eight patients with buboes had reduced. Logan published these results in the Archives of Surgery and the Journal of American Medical Surgery; she also published results for her research with Puromycin in multiple journals and archives. She also worked with fellow Harlem Hospital physician, Dr. Louis T. Wright, on antibiotic research.

=== Breast cancer research ===
In the 1960s, she dedicated her time towards researching treatments for breast cancer which led to the development of x-ray technology processes that detected the differences in tissue density more accurately; this allowed for earlier and easier detection of breast cancer as well as other types of tumors.

The upper Manhattan Medical Group of the Health Insurance Plan (HIP) was one of the first few group practices within the United States, and Logan helped found the practice as well as serve as the treasurer. Logan worked within NAACP's Health Committee, the New York State Fair Employment Practice Committee, the National Cancer Committee, and the National Medical Association Committee.

== Other affiliations ==
=== Social work ===
Logan was committed to social issues. She was a member of the New York State Committee on Discrimination, National Association for the Advancement of Colored People (NAACP), and Planned Parenthood. During Governor Thomas E. Dewey's administration, Logan served as a member of the New York State Commission on Discrimination. She and 7 other members resigned from the commission in 1944 when Dewey shelved anti-discrimination legislation they drafted. She was an active member of the Alpha Kappa Alpha sorority.

In 1970, upon retiring, she served on the New York State Workmen's Compensation Board.

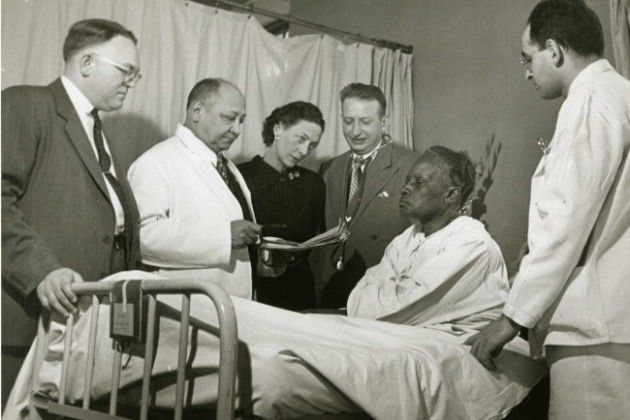
Myra Logan with colleagues at patient bedside, Harlem Hospital, New York. From left to right: Lyndon M. Hill, Louis T. Wright, Myra Logan, Aaron Prigot, unidentified African-American woman patient, and unidentified hospital employee.
