= International People's College =

Academic institution

Coordinates: 56.0284°N 12.5898°E

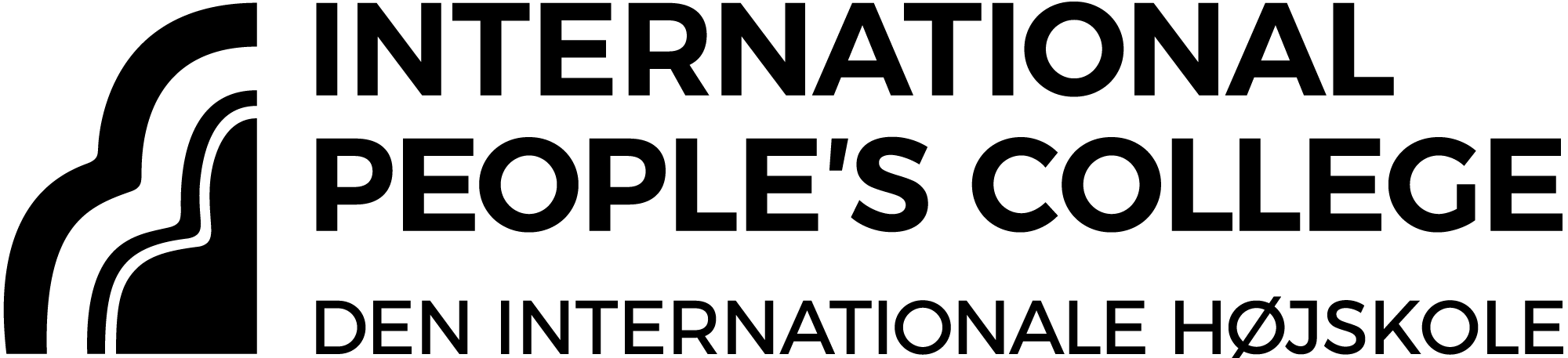
Logo of the International People's College (IPC).

The International People's College is a folk high school in Helsingør in the northern part of Zealand, Denmark, one hour from the capital city Copenhagen. It is a progressive residential international school that emphasizes community and teaches global awareness and tolerance. Up to around 110 students total, from many different countries around the world and varying ages as well, attend the school each term. Students choose to attend for a full or partial term in the autumn or spring, or for summer classes. The school is recognized by the United Nations Organization as a messenger of peace, and it has seen world leaders as students.

== History ==
The International People's College was founded by Dr. Peter Manniche in 1921. In 1943 The school was moved temporarily to the nearby town Snekkersten due to the occupation of Denmark during the Second World War. The founding Principal Dr. Manniche retired in 1954. In 2022 the school celebrated the 100 year jubilee a year delayed due to COVID-19.

== Classes ==
The classes at IPC (which are all taught in English) are subject to change every term dependent on the teachers currently at the school. In general, the school every term offers more than 30 subjects and classes, with an emphasis on active global citizenship, globalization, creativity, personal development, and regional studies. Regional-studies classes are often taught by teachers who come from the region being taught.

In 2024, the school curriculum offered classes in:

- Development Management
- Environmental Studies
- Global Challenges
- Drama
- Band Playing
- Choir
- Current Affairs
- Communication & Conflict Resolution
- Innovativity
- Culture Shock: Denmark
- Movie Making
- Latin American Culture
- Photography
- Sports
- Peace & Conflict Studies
- Culture Studies
- Create & Build
- Political Philosophy
- Religion & Culture
- Human Rights & Global Citizenship
- Danish Language (2 levels)
- English Language (3 levels)
- Professional English
- Passion & Creativity
- Asian Life & Thought
- World Cinema
- Arts & Crafts
- African Drum & Dance
- Education & Pedagogics
- Architecture and Design
- Debate Club
- Life Stories
- Yoga
- Sustainable Gardening

== Former students of renown ==
- Jørgen Nash (d. 2004), Danish painter and artist
- Jomo Kenyatta (d. 1978), Prime Minister and first president of Kenya
- Dr. D.J. Davies (d. 1956), Welsh economist and nationalist
- Myles Horton (d. 1990), American educator

== IPC alumni ==
The IPC Alumni (formerly known as the IPC Student Union / Elevforeningen) is the official organization that links former students across the world with each other - and with current activities at IPC. Everyone who has been a student at IPC on a course for at least three weeks can become a member. Others who feel like supporting the aims of the school can become members of the student union without the right to vote. After one year, full membership can be obtained if agreed upon by the board and the general assembly. Membership currently costs 200 kr. for a life-time membership, and as of April 2013 the IPC Alumni has 812 registered members. The Alumni mainly operates and communicates via its facebook page.

== See also ==
- Folk high school
