= Adele Logan Alexander =

Professor and writer

- Born: January 26, 1938 (age 88)

Academic background
- Education: Howard University
- Thesis: Ambiguous lives : free women of color in rural Georgia, 1789-1879 (1994)

Adele Logan Alexander (born January 26, 1938) is an American professor and author. A history professor at George Washington University, she has written on her family history, gender, and social issues in African American communities.

== Education and career ==
Alexander graduated from Radcliffe College, her aunt's alma mater, in 1959. She earned her Ph.D. from Howard University in 1994, after beginning her doctoral work at age 46. She is a professor of American history at George Washington University. In 2009 she was named to the National Endowment for the Humanities.

== Writings ==
Alexander's books include coverage of African American families, including notable members of her family chronicled in the Princess of the Hither Isles: A Black Suffragist's Story from the Jim Crow South about her grandmother the suffragist Adella Hunt Logan. In Homelands and Waterways: The American Journey of the Bond Family, 1846-1926, Alexander chronicles the transition from a working poor family to the middle class in the period from the Civil War to the Jazz Age. Her book Parallel Worlds describes the life of the diplomat William Henry Hunt and his wife Ida Gibbs, a leading figure in the Pan-Africanism movement in the 1910s.

In 1999 she was on the Charlie Rose show where she talked about racial identity and class. In 2020, Alexander was within a group of women talking with The New York Times about the 100-year mark of the Nineteenth Amendment to the United States Constitution, during the discussion she shared her thoughts on the actions taken by women to obtain the right to vote and her personal memories of going to vote with her mother as a young child.

== Selected publications ==
- Alexander, Adele Logan (1991). Ambiguous lives : free women of color in rural Georgia, 1789-1879. Fayetteville: University of Arkansas Press. ISBN 1-55728-214-5. OCLC 23180035.
- Alexander, Adele Logan (2000). Homelands and waterways : the American journey of the Bond family, 1846-1926 (1st ed.). New York: Vintage Books. ISBN 0-679-75871-2. OCLC 44791716.
- Alexander, Adele Logan (2019). Princess of the Hither Isles : a Black suffragist's story from the Jim Crow south. New Haven. ISBN 978-0-300-24484-7. OCLC 1117641100.
- Alexander, Adele Logan (2012). Parallel worlds : the remarkable Gibbs-Hunts and the enduring (in)significance of melanin (First paperback ed., 2012 ed.). Charlottesville: University of Virginia Press. ISBN 978-0-8139-3245-3. OCLC 793010738.

== Awards and honors ==
In 2000, Alexander won the 2000 Black Caucus Literary Award from the American Library Association. In 2003, she received a lifetime achievement award from the African American Historical and Genealogical Society.

== Personal life ==
She married Clifford Alexander Jr. in 1959. He served as Secretary of the Army from 1977 until 1981. Their daughter, Elizabeth Alexander, is a poet and writer.
