= 1900–01 Small Heath F.C. season =

Small Heath F.C.
1900–01 season
- Chairman: Walter W. Hart
- Secretary-manager: Alf Jones
- Ground: Coventry Road
- Football League Second Division: 2nd
- FA Cup: Third round (eliminated by Aston Villa)
- Birmingham Senior Cup: First round (eliminated by West Bromwich Albion)
- Birmingham Charity Cup: Semi-final (eliminated by Aston Villa)
- Top goalscorer: League: Johnny McMillan, Bob McRoberts (13); All: Johnny McMillan (14)
- Highest home attendance: 18,000 vs Aston Villa, 23 March 1901
- Lowest home attendance: 2,000 (three matches)
- Average home league attendance: 5,618
Home colours

The 1900–01 Football League season was Small Heath Football Club's ninth in the Football League and their seventh in the Second Division. They finished runners-up in the 18-team league, so were promoted to the First Division for 1901–02. They also took part in the 1900–01 FA Cup, entering at the first round proper and losing in the third round to Aston Villa after a replay. In locally organised competition, they lost to West Bromwich Albion in the first round of the Birmingham Senior Cup and to Aston Villa in the semi-final of the Lord Mayor of Birmingham's Charity Cup.

Twenty-three players made at least one appearance in nationally organised first-team competition, and there were thirteen different goalscorers. Full-back Arthur Archer and half-back Walter Wigmore were ever-present over the 39-match season; goalkeeper Nat Robinson and forward Sid Wharton each missed only one match. Johnny McMillan was leading scorer with 14 goals in all competitions; he and Bob McRoberts each scored 13 in the league. (Note: Matthews (1995) records the scorers in the 10–1 win at Blackpool as Archer, Aston 2, McRoberts 5, McMillan 2. However, in his 2010 book, Matthews writes that "Reports vary as to who scored the goals against Blackpool in March. ... After a lot of research, I have elected to choose the two five-goal heroes." This article has the scorers as per the English National Football Archive (March 2020).)

== Football League Second Division ==
Date	League position	Opponents	Venue	Result	Score F–A	Scorers	Attendance
1 September 1900	9th	Burslem Port Vale	A	D	2–2	Aston, Main	3,000
8 September 1900	10th	Leicester Fosse	H	D	0–0		8,000
15 September 1900	9th	New Brighton Tower	A	D	0–0		4,000
22 September 1900	4th	Gainsborough Trinity	H	W	6–0	Leake 2, McRoberts 2, Walton, Thornley og	2,000
29 September 1900	3rd	Walsall	A	D	2–2	McRoberts, Wigmore	3,000
6 October 1900	3rd	Burton Swifts	H	W	2–0	Walton, Higginson	2,000
13 October 1900	2nd	Barnsley	A	W	2–1	Higginson, Aston	4,000
20 October 1900	2nd	Woolwich Arsenal	H	W	2–1	Aston, Higginson	8,000
27 October 1900	1st	Blackpool	A	D	0–0		3,000
10 November 1900	4th	Chesterfield Town	H	D	0–0		6,000
17 November 1900	4th	Grimsby Town	A	D	1–1	Higginson	5,000
24 November 1900	2nd	Lincoln City	H	W	2–0	McRoberts, Leake	5,000
1 December 1900	2nd	Newton Heath	A	W	1–0	McRoberts	6,000
8 December 1900	2nd	Glossop	H	W	1–0	Aston pen	8,000
15 December 1900	1st	Middlesbrough	A	W	1–0	Archer	13,000
22 December 1900	3rd	Burnley	H	L	0–1		10,000
26 December 1900	3rd	Stockport County	H	W	2–0	Aston, McRoberts	7,000
29 December 1900	2nd	Burslem Port Vale	H	W	2–1	McRoberts 2	6,000
5 January 1901	2nd	Leicester Fosse	A	D	1–1	Aston	8,000
12 January 1901	2nd	New Brighton Tower	H	W	4–0	McRoberts 2, Main 2	2,000
19 January 1901	1st	Gainsborough Trinity	A	W	2–1	Aston, McRoberts	1,000
16 February 1901	3rd	Barnsley	H	W	3–1	McRoberts, Aston, Tebbs	8,000
2 March 1901	2nd	Blackpool	H	W	10–1	McRoberts, Aston 2, Archer, McMillan 5, Wharton	3,000
9 March 1901	2nd	Stockport County	A	D	0–0		5,000
16 March 1901	2nd	Chesterfield Town	A	D	1–1	McMillan	4,000
30 March 1901	3rd	Lincoln City	A	L	1–3	McMillan	2,500
1 April 1901	2nd	Grimsby Town	H	W	2–1	Aston, McMillan	3,500
6 April 1901	2nd	Newton Heath	H	W	1–0	McMillan	5,000
8 April 1901	2nd	Walsall	H	W	2–1	Aston, Main	4,000
13 April 1901	2nd	Glossop	A	L	0–2		2,000
15 April 1901	1st	Burton Swifts	A	W	2–0	McMillan 2	2,000
20 April 1901	1st	Middlesbrough	H	W	2–1	McMillan 2	8,000
22 April 1901	2nd	Woolwich Arsenal	A	L	0–1		3,500
27 April 1901	2nd	Burnley	A	L	0–1		1,000

=== League table (part) ===
Final Second Division table (part)
Pos	Club	Pld	W	D	L	F	A	GA	Pts
1st	Grimsby Town	34	20	9	5	60	33	1.82	49
2nd	Small Heath	34	19	10	5	57	24	2.38	48
3rd	Burnley	34	20	4	10	53	29	1.83	44
4th	Glossop	34	17	8	9	57	38	1.50	42
5th	Middlesbrough	34	15	7	15	50	40	1.54	37
Key	Pos = League position; Pld = Matches played; W = Matches won; D = Matches drawn; L = Matches lost; F = Goals for; A = Goals against; GA = Goal average; Pts = Points								
Source									

== FA Cup ==
Round	Date	Opponents	Venue	Result	Score F–A	Scorers	Attendance
First round	9 February 1901	Stoke	A	D	1–1	Main	12,000
First round replay	13 February 1901	Stoke	H	W	2–1 a.e.t	Bennett, Wharton	10,000
Second round	23 February 1901	Burnley	H	W	1–0	McMillan	11,000
Third round	23 March 1901	Aston Villa	H	D	0–0		18,000
Third round replay	27 March 1901	Aston Villa	A	L	0–1		15,000

== Appearances and goals ==
This table includes appearances and goals in nationally organised competitive matches – the Football League and FA Cup – only.
For a description of the playing positions, see Formation (association football)#2–3–5 (Pyramid).

Players' appearances and goals by competition
Name	Position	League		FA Cup		Total	
Name	Position	Apps	Goals	Apps	Goals	Apps	Goals
Nat Robinson	Goalkeeper	33	0	5	0	38	0
Ike Webb	Goalkeeper	1	0	0	0	1	0
Arthur Archer	Full back	34	2	5	0	39	2
Frank Lester	Full back	7	0	0	0	7	0
Billy Pratt	Full back	16	0	2	0	16	2
Willie Wragg	Full back	1	0	0	0	1	0
George Adey	Half back	24	0	4	0	28	0
George Layton	Half back	4	0	0	0	4	0
Alex Leake	Half back	31	3	5	0	36	3
Billy Walton	Half back	24	2	4	0	28	2
Walter Wigmore	Half back	34	1	5	0	39	1
Jack Aston	Forward	29	12	5	0	34	12
Billy Bennett	Forward	28	0	5	1	33	1
Thomas Fletcher	Forward	2	0	0	0	2	0
Alfred Gard	Forward	3	0	0	0	3	0
Jock Henderson	Forward	4	0	0	0	4	0
Jack Higginson	Forward	11	4	0	0	11	4
Johnny McMillan	Forward	13	13	3	1	16	14
Bob McRoberts	Forward	26	13	3	0	29	13
Walter Main	Forward	13	4	4	1	17	5
James Tebbs	Forward	3	1	0	0	3	1
Sid Wharton	Forward	33	1	5	1	38	2
