= 1898–99 Small Heath F.C. season =

Small Heath F.C.
1898–99 season
- Chairman: Walter W. Hart
- Secretary: Alfred Jones
- Ground: Coventry Road
- Football League Second Division: 8th
- FA Cup: Second round (eliminated by Stoke)
- Birmingham Senior Cup: Second round (eliminated by Aston Villa)
- Staffordshire Senior Cup: Second round (eliminated by Walsall)
- Birmingham Charity Cup: First round (eliminated by West Bromwich Albion)
- Top goalscorer: League: Walter Abbott (34); All: Walter Abbott (42)
- Highest home attendance: 10,000 (three matches)
- Lowest home attendance: 2,000 vs Darwen (26 November 1898)
Team colours

The 1898–99 Football League season was Small Heath's seventh in the Football League and their fifth in the Second Division. With four games of the seasons remaining, they were in fourth place, two points below the promotion positions, but a draw and three defeats in those last four games left them with an eight-place finish in the 18-team league. They also took part in the 1898–99 FA Cup, entering at the third qualifying round and progressing to the second round proper (round of 16), at which stage they were eliminated by Stoke after a replay. In local cup competitions, Small Heath reached the second round of the Birmingham Cup and Staffordshire Cup, and lost to West Bromwich Albion in the first round of the Mayor of Birmingham's Charity Cup.

Twenty-three players made at least one appearance in nationally organised first-team competition, and there were thirteen different goalscorers. Walter Abbott scored 42 goals, of which 34 were scored in the league, a season's best for the Second Division. Both totals remain as of 2012 club records. Abbott, half back Alex Leake and forward Sid Wharton each played in all 40 league and FA Cup matches over the season, and three other players missed only one such game.

== Background ==
In the 1897–98 season, Small Heath finished sixth in the 16-team Second Division, nine points behind the promotion test match positions. After the test match series left two teams needing to play out a goalless draw in their final match for both to be promoted, which unsurprisingly is what happened, the Football League's Annual General Meeting agreed that the First Division be extended from 16 to 18 clubs and that the top two teams in the Second Division at the end of each season should automatically replace the bottom two teams in the First. A vote was taken on the teams to take the two additional places in the First Division; Small Heath came fourth in the vote, so remained in the Second Division for the 1898–99 season. They were again awarded exemption only for the first two rounds of the qualifying competition for the FA Cup.

A Football League committee ruled on irregularities in the transfer of Jimmy Inglis to Southern League club Swindon Town. The transfer took place on a Sunday, contrary to league rules, and the forms were falsified. The player was suspended for the first month of the coming season, two Swindon Town directors were suspended for three months, each club was fined £10, and each secretary was warned as to his future conduct. Apart from Jack Kirton, who also joined Swindon, and Charlie Hare, who left the club for Watford of the Southern League, having "secured a business engagement" in that town, the remaining players signed on again for the new season. Great things were expected of Bob McRoberts, the pacy and skilful Gainsborough Trinity centre forward for whom Small Heath paid a £150 transfer fee.

There were no changes to the team's kit of light blue shirts with navy collar trim, cuffs and pocket, white knickerbockers and navy socks.

== Review ==
=== September–October ===
Burton Swifts led Small Heath at half time in the first game of the league season. Early in the second half, debutant Bob McRoberts tapped in to equalise after Sid Wharton's fierce shot could only be parried, then Swifts regained the lead via a twice-taken penalty, but the game was one-sided thereafter, and the final score was 6–2 to the visitors. The Nottinghamshire Guardian's correspondent thought Small Heath "appeared a well-balanced team all round." A comfortable victory followed at home to Lincoln City on the Tuesday. Billy Bennett opened the scoring, Alex Leake contributed a penalty, and Walter Abbott took his tally to four from two games. In front of a large crowd at Coventry Road, Burslem Port Vale continued their winning opening to the season. The Dart was unimpressed by the home team's shooting – "fully half-a-dozen excellent chances were missed right in front of goal", including a Leake penalty.

Small Heath took a three-goal lead in the first round of the Mayor of Birmingham's Charity Cup, but visitors West Bromwich Albion scored four times in the second half to progress to the semi-final. In the absence of Henry Clutterbuck, Ike Webb made his Football League debut in goal in a comfortable 3–1 win at home to Barnsley, newly elected to the Second Division. The Dart enthused about McRoberts, who "again gave a creditable display and scored one magnificent goal, after as pretty a run as I have witnessed in many a day", but was concerned about the quality of his teammates. September ended with a trip to Loughborough which "on paper ... appeared a certainty for the Heathens, but in actual play Loughborough were the masters, and richly deserved two points instead of one." This was the first match of the season in which Abbott failed to score.

Grimsby Town achieved their first win of the season, by two goals to nil at home to Small Heath, despite the visitors' insistence that the second should not have counted as the ball had entered the goal through the side netting. In the second half, McRoberts hit the post and Grimsby had a third "goal" disallowed for offside. The first-round Staffordshire Cup-tie at Wolverhampton Wanderers was drawn, the home goalkeeper saving a penalty. Playing with a vocal crowd of 5,000 spectators and a strong wind behind them, Small Heath's first two goals against Newton Heath were disallowed, both for offside, before they conceded against the run of play, but they then took advantage of the conditions to score three times before half-time, through Abbott, Walton and Robertson. Against the wind, they changed their style of play: "they no longer indulged in short passing, but in long kicking and rushing", the defence, particularly Billy Pratt stood firm, and Inglis made the final score 4–1. The Dart picked out McRoberts, who "played a clever game in the centre", and Walton and Inglis as "a decided improvement" on Bennett and Good on the right wing.

Away from home, results were different. New Brighton Tower had no difficulty in remaining unbeaten, overcoming Small Heath by four goals, all scored in the first half. Back at Coventry Road, Small Heath knocked Wolverhampton Wanderers out of the Staffordshire Cup by six goals to four, and enjoyed a comfortable win in the third qualifying round of the FA Cup, defeating Chirk 8–0 with three goals from Walton, two each by Abbott and Inglis, and one from Leake.

=== November–December ===
In front of 7,000 spectators, Woolwich Arsenal outclassed Small Heath in a match where Clutterbuck played well to keep their score down to two. According to the Penny Illustrated Paper, "the game was of lively character, but by no means high class from the football point of view. However, the Arsenal won, and the crowd were satisfied, their feeling of exultation being heightened by the fact that the visitors inclined to unfair tactics in the effort to alter the score." In a match "hardly up to cup tie standard", Walsall eliminated Small Heath from the Staffordshire Cup.

New signing Arthur Gardner scored twice and William Robertson three times as Small Heath began a run of high-scoring games with a 9–0 win at home to Luton Town. They went one better at home to Druids in the FA Cup, McRoberts contributing a hat-trick, and in front of the lowest league crowd of the season, around 2,000, "completely outplayed" Darwen, Walter Abbott scoring five of his team's eight goals.

Small Heath failed to continue their winning ways at Gainsborough Trinity, the home side equalising with a last-minute penalty. The Dart predicted Burslem Port Vale might prove stiffer opposition in the FA Cup than did Chirk and Druids in the previous rounds, but in a game "too one-sided to be really interesting", Small Heath progressed into the competition proper by seven goals to nil. In a game "contested in spiritless fashion", Small Heath knocked Burton Wanderers out of the Birmingham Cup, the 4–0 score completing a sequence of six home games in which they scored no fewer than 49 goals. The Owl acknowledged that if their away form were in any way comparable, promotion would be "a foregone conclusion", but "they have fared very badly away from home, and there will have to be a vast improvement in their form in "out" matches if they are to overtake Newton Heath and Manchester City" at the top of the division.

Sid Wharton starred in an expected win at Glossop North End, preceding a close game at home to Walsall in which "feeling ran high, and the whistle was going frequently for free kicks", settled by a McRoberts goal after an hour. In pouring rain on Boxing Day, Small Heath beat Blackpool 5–0, and the next day, in similar weather, a large crowd turned up to see Manchester City team lose 4–1. The Manchester Guardian gave credit where due: "The visitors, however, did not come quite up to expectation, though no liberties could be taken with them. The home side played exceedingly well". The year finished with a fourth consecutive win, this time at home to Burton Swifts, who "made a better show than Manchester did on Tuesday" but still lost 4–1.

=== January–February ===
Going into the new year in fourth position in the table, three points behind the leaders with a game in hand, the club committee were reported to have offered the players "special inducements" to achieve promotion. They began the year with a defeat; on a pitch in "wretched" condition, Burslem Port Vale scored the only goal three minutes from the end of an even game. At Barnsley, the home side were three goals to the good after only 15 minutes. After the interval, McRoberts and Barnsley's John McCartney were spoken to by the referee for "getting keen", the visitors rallied, then scored from a scramble after the ball hit the crossbar. With 20 minutes remaining, Barnsley scored a fourth, and the visitors were beaten. Although Wharton scored a second near the end, the final score was 7–2. In the second round of the Birmingham Cup, played "in terrible weather, and with the pitch in fearful condition", former Small Heath hero Fred Wheldon scored twice to secure a draw for Aston Villa. Conditions had not improved by the next league game. "Scientific football was quite out of the question" as Small Heath, playing with "tremendous dash", beat Loughborough 6–1, with three goals for Abbott, two for Wharton, and a first goal for Harry Wilcox.

The players underwent "special preparation" for the first-round FA Cup-tie at home to Manchester City. According to the Sheffield Independent, "probably the visitors, Manchester City, are the more skilful team, but Small Heath are gluttons for goals at Coventry road, and there is likely to be a very lively hour and half's play". A crowd estimated at between 15,000 and 18,000 attended to witness that prediction prove accurate. Early goals from Abbott and City's George Dougal preceded Small Heath taking a half-time lead via "a very clever piece of work" by McRoberts. City were "showing perhaps the greater skill, but Small Heath working most pluckily". After an equaliser from Billie Gillespie, Small Heath "had more than one easy chance of scoring, the men missing opportunities which should have been utilised", until five minutes from time, McRoberts gave them the victory. Cab-drivers who regularly transported football followers from Aston Villa's ground back to the city centre were hopeful of taking advantage of the large attendance to do the same from Small Heath. However, they had few takers, "quite half the brakes returned to the centre of the city empty", and the Owl wondered if one might infer that "those who go to Aston can afford to ride, whereas those who patronise Small Heath find it cheaper to walk". Without Pratt, Leake and Inglis, Small Heath lost the Birmingham Cup replay 5–2.

On a slippery surface, Abbott opened the scoring at home to Grimsby Town straight from the kick-off, James Cockshutt equalised from a penalty, and Robertson scored the winner near the end, to put his team fifth in the table, two points behind the promotion places with a game in hand. Drawn at First Division Stoke in the second round of the FA Cup, Small Heath were a goal behind at the interval and had lost McRoberts to a broken collarbone. Despite the numerical disadvantage, they had the wind in their favour, and took the lead ten minutes into the second half through Abbott and wharton. The lead did not last long, and despite a frantic finish, the match was drawn. Wilcox took McRoberts' place for the replay four days later. In a game "contested in a most lively fashion" despite the heavy pitch, Stoke took a two-goal lead, Inglis pulled one back for Small Heath, but the home side were eliminated.

Missing Gardner and Robertson through suspension, and also without full-back Archer, Small Heath nevertheless beat New Brighton Tower 3–2 in a "wonderfully fine game", Wilcox supplying the late winner. A "disappointing" Small Heath team "fought bravely" but lost 2–0 at Newton Heath to go into March in sixth place, still with games on hand on those above them. The club confirmed that McRoberts had returned home to Scotland to recover from the injury that was expected to keep him out for the rest of the season, and that he had agreed to renew his contract for the following season despite interest from First Division clubs.

=== March–April ===
Having failed to sign Walsall's Scottish centre-forward Tommy Vail on loan, Wilcox again filled in for McRoberts at home to Woolwich Arsenal. On a rain-soaked pitch and during a first-half hailstorm, Small Heath completed a comfortable victory. Will Devey returned from non-League football to open the scoring away at Blackpool, but the home team equalised soon after the interval, and were judged unfortunate not to take both points.

Using as an illustration the £10 apiece "besides special prizes from the committee and tradespeople" to be received by Small Heath's players should they achieve promotion, the Manchester Times reported with disapproval on the concept of success-related bonus payments. Where "one would naturally and fairly conclude that like honest men [players] have done the best they can for their employers", said employers offer additional rewards "which it is expected will stimulate the players to renewed exertions", "the whole proceeding being a stigma on sport, stamping it with a ring of low commercialism that is very obnoxious to the old lover of amateur football."

Luton Town's poor run continued with a 3–2 defeat at home to Small Heath, coming back from two goals down but then conceding a second-half penalty. A three-nil home defeat left Small Heath in fifth place in the table, three points behind the day's opponents, Leicester Fosse, in third and four behind the promotion places. The visit to Darwen saw the unexpected return from injury of Bob McRoberts, who scored an equalising goal, but the draw, against a team with only six points at this late stage of the season, dropped Small Heath to sixth place in the table. Their poor results continued at Lincoln City, where they needed an apparently offside goal from Billy Bennett to come back from a two-goal deficit to earn a draw.

Despite losing full-back Billy Pratt to a dislocated collarbone in the first half, Small Heath beat Gainsborough Trinity 6–1 to raise their goals tally to more than that of any team either division. Walter Wigmore, who joined Small Heath from Gainsborough in March for a £150 fee to resume his forward partnership with McRoberts, scored twice against his former club. A one-nil friendly win against West Bromwich Albion preceded the return fixture with Gainsborough, won by Small Heath by a single goal in a match where the visitors "rarely crossed the centre line" in the second half and the home side missed numerous chances. The win took Small Heath up to fourth place, two points behind the second promotion position with four matches remaining.

The visit to league leaders Manchester City produced a two-goal defeat. Playing into the sun and wind, Small Heath were mostly on the defensive, and Clutterbuck played well to keep City at bay. On change of ends, the visitors improved, but City full backs Di Jones and Dick Ray were on top form. In the last twenty minutes, City were on top, and Fred Williams scored twice, the second coming from a penalty after Billy Meredith was fouled. Off the field, the West Midlands clubs submitted a complaint to the football authorities about attempts by the southern clubs to poach their players, which led to the suspension of "an agent of a well-known Southern club" and the temporary closure of Thames Ironworks' ground.

In a game "contested with warmth" in which "the referee's whistle was often heard", McRoberts gave the home team a short-lived lead against second-placed Glossop North End, but the match was drawn, leaving it extremely unlikely, albeit still mathematically possible, for Small Heath to be promoted. After Abbott missed an early penalty at Walsall, Small Heath put up a poor performance to lose 2–0, and the league programme ended at Leicester Fosse. Neither club fielded a full-strength team, and an "interesting" game finished goalless.

== Summary and aftermath ==
After being close to the second promotion place throughout the season, Small Heath eventually finished eighth, five points behind second-placed Glossop North End and a further six behind champions Manchester City. They scored more goals than any other team in the division except Manchester City, and scored more at home than any other, but their away record was poor. The Dart suggested that "the backs are all right, the defect that needs remedying is the half-back line, which is hardly up to the necessary standard." Of the 47 players registered for the club during the season, 23 made at least one appearance in nationally organised first-team competition, and there were thirteen different goalscorers. Walter Abbott scored 42 goals, of which 34 were scored in the league, a season's best for the Second Division. Both totals remain (as of 2012) club records. (Note: The Rec.Sport.Soccer Statistics Foundation (RSSSF) list Abbott as having scored a divisional best 33 goals in the Second Division, but the club records him as having scored 34.) Abbott, half back Alex Leake and forward Sid Wharton each played in all 40 league and FA Cup matches over the season, and goalkeeper Henry Clutterbuck and full backs Arthur Archer and Billy Pratt missed only one such game.

Off the field, the club made a profit of £755, which was the second highest in the Second Division, albeit way behind Woolwich Arsenal's £3,643, despite Small Heath's gate receipts exceeding those of Arsenal by £360.

Abbott left for First Division club Everton for a fee of £250 plus the proceeds of a midweek friendly match, William Robertson signed for Bristol Rovers, and Clutterbuck joined Southern League club Queens Park Rangers. Walter Main, a forward from Scottish club Airdrieonians, was "expected to be a worthy successor to Abbott", and half-back Tom Farnall returned from Bristol Rovers.

== Match details ==
=== Football League Second Division ===
Date	League position	Opponents	Venue	Result	Score F–A	Scorers	Attendance
3 September 1898	7th	Burton Swifts	A	W	6–2	Abbott 2, McRoberts 2, Dunlop, Leake	3,000
5 September 1898	2nd	Lincoln City	H	W	4–1	Bennett, Leake, Abbott 2	3,000
10 September 1898	4th	Burslem Port Vale	H	L	1–2	Abbott	10,000
17 September 1898	4th	Barnsley St Peter's	H	W	3–1	McRoberts, Abbott, Wharton	3,000
24 September 1898	4th	Loughborough	A	D	1–1	McRoberts	2,000
8 October 1898	7th	Grimsby Town	A	L	0–2		2,000
15 October 1898	4th	Newton Heath	H	W	4–1	Abbott, Walton, Robertson, Inglis	5,000
22 October 1898	9th	New Brighton Tower	A	L	0–4		3,000
5 November 1898	10th	Woolwich Arsenal	A	L	0–2		7,000
12 November 1898	9th	Luton Town	H	W	9–0	Gardner 2, McRoberts, Wharton, Inglis, Robertson 3, Abbott	4,000
26 November 1898	7th	Darwen	H	W	8–0	Gardner 2, Abbott 5 (1 pen), McRoberts	2,000
3 December 1898	7th	Gainsborough Trinity	A	D	1–1	Gardner	1,500
17 December 1898	8th	Glossop North End	A	W	2–1	Abbott, Inglis	1,000
24 December 1898	6th	Walsall	H	W	2–1	Gardner, McRoberts	6,500
26 December 1898	5th	Blackpool	H	W	5–0	Inglis, Walton, Abbott 2, McRoberts	4,000
27 December 1898	5th	Manchester City	H	W	4–1	Abbott 2, Inglis, McRoberts	10,000
31 December 1898	4th	Burton Swifts	H	W	4–1	McRoberts, Gardner 2, Abbott	4,000
7 January 1899	5th	Burslem Port Vale	A	L	0–1		4,000
14 January 1899	6th	Barnsley	A	L	2–7	Abbott, Robertson	2,000
21 January 1899	5th	Loughborough	H	W	6–0	Abbott 3, Wharton 2, Wilcox	3,000
4 February 1899	5th	Grimsby Town	H	W	2–1	Abbott, Robertson	6,000
18 February 1899	5th	New Brighton Tower	H	W	3–2	Abbott 2, Wilcox	9,500
25 February 1899	6th	Newton Heath	A	L	0–2		2,000
4 March 1899	5th	Woolwich Arsenal	H	W	4–1	Abbott 3, Wharton	3,000
8 March 1899	6th	Blackpool	A	D	1–1	Devey	2,000
11 March 1899	4th	Luton Town	A	W	3–2	Abbott 3 (1 pen)	1,000
18 March 1899	5th	Leicester Fosse	H	L	0–3		10,000
25 March 1899	6th	Darwen	A	D	1–1	McRoberts	2,000
31 March 1899	6th	Lincoln City	A	D	2–2	Wigmore, Bennett	5,000
1 April 1899	4th	Gainsborough Trinity	H	W	6–1	Abbott 3, Wigmore 2, Bennett	6,000
8 April 1899	5th	Manchester City	A	L	0–2		20,000
15 April 1899	7th	Glossop North End	H	D	1–1	McRoberts	6,000
22 April 1899	8th	Walsall	A	L	0–2		4,000
29 April 1899	8th	Leicester Fosse	A	D	0–0		4,000

Final Second Division table (part)
Pos
Club	Pld	W	D	L	F	A	GA	Pts	
6	Walsall	34	15	12	7	79	36	2.19	41
7	Woolwich Arsenal	34	18	5	11	72	41	1.76	41
8	Small Heath	34	17	7	10	85	50	1.70	41
9	Burslem Port Vale	34	17	5	12	56	34	1.65	39
10	Grimsby Town	34	15	5	14	71	60	1.18	35
Key: Pld = Matches played; W = Matches won; D = Matches drawn; L = Matches lost; F = Goals for; A = Goals against; GA = Goal average; Pts = Points

=== FA Cup ===
Round	Date	Opponents	Venue	Result	Score F–A	Scorers	Attendance
3rd qual	29 October 1898	Chirk	H	W	8–0	Walton 3, Inglis 2, Abbott 2, Leake	3,000
4th qual	19 November 1898	Druids	H	W	10–0	Abbott 2, McRoberts 3, Gardner, Inglis 2, Leake, Hughes og	4,000
5th qual	10 December 1898	Burslem Port Vale	H	W	7–0	Gardner, McRoberts, Abbott 3, Wharton, Inglis	7,000
1st round	28 January 1899	Manchester City	H	W	3–2	Abbott, McRoberts 2	15,399
2nd round	11 February 1899	Stoke	A	D	2–2	McRoberts, Wharton	16,000
2nd round replay	15 February 1899	Stoke	H	L	1–2	Inglis	14,379

=== Mayor of Birmingham's Charity Cup ===
Round	Date	Opponents	Venue	Result	Score F–A	Scorers	Attendance	Ref
First	12 September 1898	West Bromwich Albion	H	L	3–4	Oakes, Abbott, Good	3,000	

=== Birmingham Cup ===
Round	Date	Opponents	Venue	Result	Score F–A	Scorers	Attendance	Ref
First round	12 December 1898	Burton Wanderers	H	W	4–0	McRoberts 2, Arthur Gardner, Abbott	"Small"	
Second round	16 January 1899	Aston Villa	H	D	2–2	Wilcox, Abbott	Not known	
Second round replay	30 January 1899	Aston Villa	A	L	2–5	Wharton, Abbott	10,000	

=== Staffordshire Cup ===
Round	Date	Opponents	Venue	Result	Score F–A	Scorers	Attendance	Ref
First round	10 October 1898	Wolverhampton Wanderers	A	D	1–1	Not known	2,000	
First round replay	24 October 1898	Wolverhampton Wanderers	H	W	6–4	Not known	Not known	
Second round	7 November 1898	Walsall	H	L	1–3	Not known	Not known	

=== Other matches ===
Date	Opponents	Venue	Result	Score F–A	Scorers	Attendance	Notes
3 April 1899	West Bromwich Albion	H	W	1–0	Gardner	"Small"	Friendly match
	Leek	H	W	2–1	Not known		Friendly match
	Gainsborough Trinity	A	W	1–0	Not known		Friendly match

== Appearances and goals ==
This table includes appearances and goals in nationally organised competitive matches – the Football League and FA Cup – only.
For a description of the playing positions, see Formation (association football)#2–3–5 (Pyramid).

Players' appearances and goals by competition
Name	Position	League		FA Cup		Total	
Name	Position	Apps	Goals	Apps	Goals	Apps	Goals
Henry Clutterbuck	Goalkeeper	33	0	6	0	39	0
Ike Webb	Goalkeeper	1	0	0	0	1	0
Arthur Archer	Full back	33	0	6	0	39	0
Frank Lester	Full back	2	0	0	0	2	0
Billy Pratt	Full back	33	0	6	0	39	0
Thomas Dunlop	Half back	9	1	1	0	10	1
George Layton	Half back	2	0	0	0	2	0
Alex Leake	Half back	34	2	6	2	40	4
William Robertson	Half back	32	7	6	1	38	8
Billy Walton	Half back	28	2	6	3	34	5
Walter Abbott	Forward	34	34	6	8	40	42
George Adey	Forward	2	0	0	0	2	0
Billy Bennett	Forward	13	3	0	0	13	3
Will Devey	Forward	2	1	0	0	2	1
Arthur Gardner	Forward	16	9	3	2	19	11
Michael Good	Forward	4	0	0	0	4	0
Jimmy Inglis	Forward	17	5	6	6	23	11
Bob McRoberts	Forward	26	10	5	6	31	16
Thomas Oakes	Forward	2	0	1	0	3	0
Sid Wharton	Forward	34	6	6	2	40	8
Walter Wigmore	Forward	7	3	0	0	7	3
Harry Wilcox	Forward	9	2	2	0	11	2
Jack Price	Forward	1	0	0	0	1	0
