= 1899–1900 Small Heath F.C. season =

Small Heath F.C.
1899–1900 season
- Chairman: Walter W. Hart
- Secretary: Alfred Jones
- Ground: Coventry Road
- Football League Second Division: 3rd (of 18)
- FA Cup: 5th qualifying round (eliminated by Walsall)
- Birmingham Senior Cup: First round (eliminated by Wolverhampton Wanderers)
- Staffordshire Senior Cup: First round (eliminated by Wolverhampton Wanderers)
- Lord Mayor of Birmingham's Charity Cup: Semi-final (eliminated by Walsall)
- Top goalscorer: League: Bob McRoberts (19); All: Bob McRoberts (24)
- Highest home attendance: 12,000 vs Bolton Wanderers (30 September 1899)
- Lowest home attendance: 1,000 vs Middlesbrough (6 January 1900)
Team colours

The 1899–1900 Football League season was Small Heath Football Club's eighth in the Football League and their sixth in the Second Division. They spent most of the season in the top four in the 18-team division, but rarely in the top two, eventually finishing in third place, six points behind the promotion positions. They also took part in the 1899–1900 FA Cup, entering at the third qualifying round and losing to Walsall after a replay in the fifth qualifying round. In local cup competitions, they were beaten by Wolverhampton Wanderers in the first round of both the Birmingham and Staffordshire Cups, and by Walsall in the semi-final of the Lord Mayor of Birmingham's Charity Cup.

Twenty-one players represented the club in nationally organised first-team competition, and there were fifteen different goalscorers. Bob McRoberts was the top scorer with 24 goals, of which 19 came in league matches. No other player reached double figures. McRoberts, goalkeeper Nat Robinson and full-back Arthur Archer played in every match. Off the field, the club made a significant financial loss over the season. The directors made it clear they could not continue funding a loss-making enterprise, and suggested that a reduction in players' wages was the only course of action.

== Background ==
After being close to the second promotion place throughout the 1898–99 season, Small Heath eventually finished eighth, five points behind second-placed Glossop North End and a further six behind champions Manchester City. They scored more goals than any other team in the division except Manchester City, and scored more at home than any other, but their away record was poor. The Dart suggested that "the backs are all right, the defect that needs remedying is the half-back line, which is hardly up to the necessary standard." Walter Abbott, who had scored 42 goals (34 in the league), both totals remaining (as of 2020) club records, (Note: The Rec.Sport.Soccer Statistics Foundation (RSSSF) list Abbott as having scored a divisional best 33 goals in the Second Division, but the club records him as having scored 34.) signed for Everton for a fee of £250 plus the proceeds of a midweek friendly match. William Robertson left for Bristol Rovers, and Clutterbuck joined Southern League club Queens Park Rangers. Walter Main, a forward signed from Airdrieonians, was "expected to be a worthy successor to Abbott", and half-back Tom Farnall returned from Bristol Rovers.

There were no major changes off the field. Walter Hart remained as chairman and Alf Jones as secretary. Alec Leake retained the captaincy, and there were no changes to the kit of light blue shirts with navy collar trim, cuffs and pocket, white knickerbockers and navy socks.

== Review ==
=== September–October ===
A good crowd was expected to see Walsall, employers of Small Heath's former captain Caesar Jenkyns, open the season at Coventry Road. Playing with the wind, Small Heath took an early lead, Wigmore hooking the ball into the net, and the same player scored the third goal off the crossbar in the second half as his side won 3–2. The team travelled as far as York on the Friday for the following day's match against Middlesbrough, newly admitted to the Football League. The local newspapers had little confidence in their respective teams: the Dart predicted that "Small Heath will have to struggle hard to gain a point", while the Yorkshire Herald feared that "victory can hardly be hoped for over the clever combination Small Heath". Small Heath's forward play, relying on passing between all five forwards, an approach "only possible with a forward line, the members of which have been long acquainted with each other's play", was more effective than Middlesbrough's preference for attacking down either wing and then putting in a cross. In addition, the visiting backs were not averse to the professional foul, "gaining time from the penalty against them", and the forwards "were not particular either about using hands if dispossessed of the ball". In front of a crowd of 10,000 spectators, McRoberts scored all three goals as Small Heath won 3–1. In the first round of the Mayor of Birmingham's Charity Cup, Small Heath put five second-half goals past a weak Wolverhampton Wanderers eleven, but lost the semi-final to Walsall by three goals to two.

At home to another new team, Chesterfield Town, Walter Wigmore dropped back to centre-half in place of Alex Leake, who had been injured in the Charity Cup-tie. Billy Bennett replaced Wigmore in the forward line. Playing against a strong wind, McRoberts opened the scoring when he was first to the rebound after his shot was fumbled, and Bennett converted a cross from Sid Wharton not long before the interval. Persistent attacking led to further goals, from Harry Wilcox and Walter Main, before the visitors' Herbert Munday scored when the ball rebounded off the crossbar. Main scored his second, and the home team's fifth, from a sweeping passing move, then Chesterfield made the final score 5–3. On a pitch made slippery by a thunderstorm before kickoff, the visitors had Nat Robinson to thank for keeping Gainsborough Trinity at bay; the home side protested that one shot "scooped out" by Robinson had in fact crossed the line. Then McRoberts scored a solo goal, Trinity's goalkeeper allowed Wharton's shot from distance to slip through his hands into the net, and Wharton made the half-time score 3–0 after a move between McRoberts and Wigmore left him a tap-in. Freddie Fenton pulled one back with a header after Robinson missed his punch, and Bennett made the final score 4–1 after the goalkeeper failed to hold a low shot. It was confirmed that Leake had gone to Manchester for specialist treatment on damaged ankle ligaments. At home to Bolton Wanderers, relegated from the First Division in 1899, the defence was worked hard from the outset, but Small Heath "began to wake up", and the attack went to the other end, John Willie Sutcliffe playing "grandly", particularly when the visitors temporarily went down to ten men. In heavy rain in the second half, the defences had the upper hand, and the game finished goalless. With four wins and a draw, Small Heath went into October in third place in the league, two points behind Leicester Fosse having played one game fewer.

McRoberts and Wigmore scored in the first half, against the wind, and the same players contributed three goals in the second to give Small Heath an easy victory at home to Lincoln City. A weakened eleven still managed a 2–1 win at Loughborough, which preceded the visit of Newton Heath to Coventry Road. On a fine day on a pitch in good condition, Small Heath fielded a stronger eleven than had recently been the case, Alex Leake resuming at centre-half. Goalless at the interval after a "stubbornly contested" first half, the home side had much the better of the second, and Main's 55th-minute goal from McRoberts' "excellent" pass was enough to secure the win. In the first round of the Staffordshire Cup, Small Heath drew 2–2 at home to Wolverhampton Wanderers, but lost the replay by eight goals to nil.

A crowd of more than 13,000 spectators attended league leaders Small Heath's visit to Sheffield Wednesday, where the kickoff was delayed for ten minutes because the referee had not arrived. One of the linesmen took his place, and the two teams tossed a coin to decide which would provide a replacement linesman; Small Heath won the toss. By the time the referee arrived some 15 minutes into the game, Wednesday were a goal ahead, and with two neutral officials running the line, they scored three more in the next 20 minutes. In the second half, the visitors had more of the play: their "defence was excellent, and they fully held their own", but they could not score, Wednesday's Tommy Crawshaw regularly "checking determined rushes by the visitors' front rank" to disrupt their attacking play. Robinson was singled out for praise, despite conceding four goals. In a friendly arranged as part of Walter Abbott's transfer, Small Heath beat an Everton XI by six goals to two. Oswestry United agreed to switch the venue of the third qualifying round of the FA Cup to Coventry Road, took an unexpected but, on the balance of play, deserved 2–1 lead in the first half, and then conceded nine without reply. Small Heath went into November in second place in the division, level on points with Sheffield Wednesday having played one match fewer.

=== November–December ===
Small Heath strengthened their squad with two signings. The first, Bristol Rovers' 21-year-old forward Jack Leonard, who had several previous clubs despite his youth, joined for "a large sum" and a benefit match. The second was the 33-year-old full-back Bob Cain, who played for many years for Sheffield United without missing a league match, and left Tottenham Hotspur for Albion Rovers the previous season because "the hard work was too much for him. The Hotspur that year took part in no fewer than eighty-eight fixtures, and Cain played in eighty-four of them."

They began November with a visit to Burton Swifts. With the game still goalless, Swifts missed a penalty; immediately thereafter, Arthur Archer converted a penalty against them to take the lead, and the visitors won by three goals. For the visit to New Brighton Tower, in "boisterous" weather, Small Heath were without full back Billy Pratt. Scriven opened the scoring for the visitors with a header just after Main had a goal disallowed for offside, and Leake doubled the lead just before half time with a shot that gave the goalkeeper no chance. The home side had much the better of the second half, coming close to scoring several times before Sam Raybould eventually converted a free kick, the same player equalised with an angled shot four minutes from time, and the home team came close to winning the game before time was called. The Dart thought they had thrown a point away. In the friendly agreed with Bristol Rovers as part of the Leonard transfer, Small Heath fielded several reserve players and lost 2–0.

Fog prevented Small Heath playing Wrexham in the fourth qualifying round of the FA Cup. Although Wrexham would have preferred to rearrange the game for the following Saturday, Small Heath had a league fixture against Woolwich Arsenal scheduled for that day, so guaranteed Wrexham £50 from the gate money if they agreed to play in mid-week. Small Heath were too casual in the first half; after McRoberts opened the scoring with a header, they made little positive effort and were surprised by a long shot that tied the scores. In the second half, they resumed "in a more business like style", and scored five times. The Birmingham Daily Post remarked on Billy Bennett's accurate placement of corner kicks. As the attendance was expected to be augmented by Aston Villa supporters unable to go to Liverpool to watch their own team, Small Heath arranged for half-time and full-time scores from Anfield to be displayed at their ground. At Woolwich Arsenal, "only the fine defence of Robinson and Pratt prevented a very heavy score"; Robinson's "splendid saves" kept the Arsenal out in the first half, but in the second, they had much the better of matters, and won 3–0. Small Heath went into December in third place in the division, level on points with leaders Sheffield Wednesday and second-placed Leicester Fosse, having played two games more than the Wednesday and one more than the Fosse.

The visit of Barnsley began in an open but scrappy fashion. Small Heath had numerous attempts at goal: Wharton "shot ridiculously high over, Leonard did the same", Leake's wild shot elicited laughter from the crowd, the same player inadvertently blocked a shot on target, before a passing move involving Main and Wharton led to McRoberts "cleverly touch[ing] the ball past Greaves". Wigmore added a second shortly before the interval. In the second half, the Heathens added three more goals and had another three disallowed, all for offside; the referee "was very strong on the off-side rule, and some of his decisions, which affected both sides, greatly displeased the spectators". Walsall's goalkeeper Billy Tennant kept his side in the fifth qualifying round FA Cup-tie at Coventry Road. The match finished goalless, and was replayed later in the week, forcing the postponement of the first round Birmingham Cup-tie against Wolverhampton Wanderers. On a snow-covered pitch, Walsall scored twice in the first half, Small Heath missed a penalty and failed to progress to the rounds proper of the competition.

After frozen snow was removed from the playing surface, Small Heath enjoyed a deserved 3–0 victory against Luton Town with two goals from Bennett and a late third from Scriven. A week later, in fine weather, they lost by the same score at Burslem Port Vale. The Boxing Day friendly at Aston Villa attracted a large attendance, who saw the home side win by five goals to two. The next day's match at home to Grimsby Town started on a frosty pitch in misty conditions. Visibility worsened and the players left the field after 25 minutes. Play resumed and Leonard scored for Small Heath, but the match was abandoned at half time because of the fog. In the two clubs' fifth meeting of the season, "for a long time Small Heath scarcely crossed the half-way line, and it was fortunate for them that the defence was so reliable", but Walsall gradually took control of play and retained that control throughout the match. The Birmingham Post attributed Walsall's dominance to centre-half Caesar Jenkyns – Small Heath's former captain – "who again played a wonderfully-fine game—not only checking the opposing vanguard but feeding his own forwards with excellent judgment." Small Heath went into the new year in fourth place in the division, four points behind leaders Leicester Fosse having played one game fewer.

=== January–February ===
The "miserable weather" left the pitch in a "sloppy" condition and deterred the paying public from witnessing Small Heath's 5–0 defeat of Middlesbrough with goals from five different scorers: Pratt, Bayley and Bennett in the first half, Scrivens and McRoberts in the second. In the postponed Birmingham Cup-tie, Wolverhampton Wanderers missed a second-half penalty awarded when Lester, selected at full back in place of Archer, caught the ball in the mistaken belief that it had gone out of play, but scored the only goal of the game five minutes later. On an uneven surface, Small Heath played out a goalless draw at Chesterfield Town. The defence and half-backs, particularly Leake at centre half, "times out of number breaking up the attack of his opponents by his dogged determination", were singled out for praise, but the forwards were "ragged and unsatisfactory", not helped by Scrivens' shoulder injury. The Sheffield Independent suggested that "each team appeared to hold the other in deepest respect", and neither side seemed disappointed with the result.

After Gainsborough Trinity took the lead at Coventry Road, Small Heath lost a forward when Jack Aston, newly arrived from Woolwich Arsenal, suffered a coughing fit and was withdrawn on doctor's orders. The home side equalised before half time, Layton scored after the interval, and when he added a third goal, the visitors fell apart and conceded a further five goals in the last fifteen minutes. Aston recovered in time to start the next game, at home to Burslem Port Vale, and opened the scoring from a free kick after ten minutes, but the visitors soon tied the scores. In the second half, Small Heath raised their game, "at times more force than necessary was used", and Leake headed the winner. They went into February still in fourth place in the division, three points behind leaders Bolton Wanderers having played one game fewer.

The club lost a forward on a permanent basis when the directors dismissed Jack Leonard for misconduct. Having been fined 20s plus costs on 18 January for being drunk and disorderly, Leonard committed a similar offence that same night and was sentenced to one month's imprisonment.

A draw at league leaders Bolton Wanderers, combined with Sheffield Wednesday's defeat at Newton Heath, improved Small Heath's chances of promotion. McRoberts scored in the first half, but Bolton equalised ten minutes from time, having earlier missed a penalty. The Birmingham Daily Post suggested that "a few more games like this away from Coventry Road will go a long way towards securing them admission to the First League". On hard ground, with snow carried on the "biting cold wind", Alec Leake, playing at inside-left instead of his customary half-back position, was involved in most of the six goals Small Heath put past Loughborough to move up to second place in the division. Against Grimsby Town in the match originally postponed because of fog, the home side's "failure to score was simply unaccountable", while Pratt's attempted clearance produced an own goal to give the visitors an unexpected victory. At Newton Heath, faced with such a "muddy swamp" that "sometimes [the ball] would hit a dry patch and skim along for some distance, at other times, a hard shot would simply send it a yard or two through the mud", Small Heath protested that the ground was unfit for play, but the referee disagreed. Nevertheless, the visitors took a 2–1 half-time lead through Aston and Wharton, but the home players forced a 3–2 win. The Post thought the winning goal should have been disallowed.

Messrs Thos. Cook & Son put on a cheap rail excursion in connection with the visit of Sheffield Wednesday. Wednesday were without several players through injury, and old Small Heath favourite Billy Walton played his first game of the season in place of Jack Aston. Heavy rain had left the pitch muddy with pools of standing water, but the referee made little allowance for the conditions, stopping the game frequently, "often for trivial breaches of the law". Layton and Wharton gave Small Heath a 2–1 lead by half time, and Bennett and Leake took the final score to 4–1. The Sheffield Independent thought that "the losers had quite as much of the game as the winners" and that "all the luck in the game went one way, and that in the way of the 'Heathens'."

=== March–April ===
March began with a 1–0 friendly defeat at Southern League club Reading; the home team missed "chances galore". As part of Birmingham Athletic Club's annual gymnastics display, in aid of the Birmingham Daily Mail's Reservists' Fund, a selection of Small Heath footballers took on (and beat) their Aston Villa counterparts at tug-of-war. Other attractions included exhibition drills by local regiments, a demonstration of quarterstaff fighting, weightlifting, and "a coloured boxer, Joe Elms, from America". The club sponsored a charity concert at the Prince of Wales Theatre, in aid of the Reservists' Fund and local hospitals.

The league programme resumed with Small Heath in third place in the division, one point behind leaders Sheffield Wednesday and level with second-placed Bolton Wanderers, having played two games more than the Wednesday and one more than Bolton. They recorded a 2–0 home win against Burton Swifts, though the performance was unimpressive. The forward play was disorganised, attributed by the Post to McRoberts' late withdrawal through injury. Walton, the regular twelfth man, was absent, so reserve team player Sam Cole was called out of the crowd to take McRoberts' place. The spectators did him no favours: "inasmuch as he did not commence well, a section of the crowd began to jeer at him, and naturally he performed more indifferently than before". It proved his only Football League appearance. Lester and Cain were also injured; it was suspected that Cain's twisted knee would keep him out for the season.

The scoreline was repeated the next week at home to New Brighton Tower. Tom Scrivens scored both goals, and according to the Post, "was always in the thick of the fights around goal, and with more experience should make a very capable player in the centre-forward position." The team travelled to Grimsby Town the day before the match, breaking their journey at Lincoln. Still without McRoberts, the team's weakness was in attack – Billy Walton was the fifth different centre-forward in five games, and less effective than Scrivens – and at left-half, where Layton was frequently beaten, and Grimsby won by two goals to one.

Small Heath had to manage without Walter Wigmore for the home game against Woolwich Arsenal because he was engaged for the Football League representative eleven to play the Scottish League XI. The Glasgow Herald thought the English half backs, "while all working hard, showed no special aptitude such as is necessary for great matches", and the Birmingham Daily Post believed that having to desert his "dashing, bustling" style for a more "quiet, scientific" method of play affected him adversely. McRoberts' return to fitness "had a very beneficial effect" on Small Heath, who beat the Arsenal 3–1 with goals from Leake, McRoberts himself, and Aston. The crowd picked out Arsenal full-back Jimmy Jackson as that day's target for abuse, to the extent that he "lost his temper ... and subsequently became erratic."

The Dundee Courier and Argus reported that Small Heath were suffering financial difficulties stemming from falling attendances. On the field, they could only draw at Barnsley. Leake scored the equalising goal, but was kicked on the knee during the second half and could contribute little thereafter. Another draw followed, this time goalless in "a perfect hurricane" at Lincoln City, who had the better of a rough game. Small Heath enjoyed an unexpectedly comfortable victory at home to Leicester Fosse, by four goals to one, but in the reverse fixture two days later, the Fosse won 2–0. Between these two matches, Tom Scrivens and Walter Main were part of the Birmingham & District League team that opposed the Lancashire Combination at Coventry Road. Scrivens created the only goal of the game, scored by Leigh of Aston Villa. The league season finished with Small Heath's first away victory of 1900. They defeated Luton Town by two goals to one, both goals scored in the first half by McRoberts and the on-form Main. The result confirmed their third-place finish, six points adrift of the promotion positions.

Small Heath's reserves reached the semi-final of the Walsall Cup, but were beaten 4–1 in a replay by an Aston Villa reserve team "showing superior form in all departments of the game". In a post-season friendly, Jack Aston's goal earned a draw with West Bromwich Albion, and in the last match of the season at Coventry Road, the reserves played a Birmingham Police team to benefit the Association for Providing Boots and Clothing for Destitute Children.

== Summary and aftermath ==
After the first game of the season, Small Heath were never out of the top four in the division, but were rarely in the top two. Opinions varied as to the quality of their achievement. The Liverpool Mercury thought that "Small Heath deserve some commiseration, for they rank a good third, but next season the probability is that they will not have such strong rivals to battle against as the Wanderers and the Blades". The Sheffield Independent concurred, but the Dart was less supportive: "The Heathens were confidently expected to gain second place, but they gave one or two woeful exhibitions at home, and threw good chances away."

Twenty-one different players represented the club in nationally organised competitive matches during the season and there were fifteen different goalscorers. Bob McRoberts was the top scorer with 24 goals, but no other player reached double figures. Goalkeeper Nat Robinson, full-back Arthur Archer and McRoberts played in every match. The match against Bolton Wanderers attracted a crowd of 12,000, but only around 1,000 were present for the visit of Middlesbrough in January.

Chairman W.W. Hart, who was re-elected to the management committee of the Football League at its annual meeting in May, reported that the club had made a significant financial loss over the season. The £250 deficit of the previous season had risen to more than £1,100. He made it clear that the directors could not continue funding a loss-making enterprise, and the only viable solution was to reduce the wage bill. Although most league clubs were in a comparable position because of unusual circumstances, namely the pressure placed on them to increase wages in order to retain players sought after by the wealthy southern clubs, it was "monstrous" that from an income of £3,400, £2,800 should be paid out in players' wages. However, the southern clubs now being less well-off would make no short-term improvement in the club's finances, because contracts for the coming season had already been agreed. According to the Birmingham Argus, "had they known that the Southern clubs would not be scrambling for their players, they might have saved £350 in wages during the next football season." The chairman did not think the ongoing Boer War had an adverse effect on attendances. Some £140 was raised by holding sports meetings at Coventry Road. As well as the usual athletics and cycling, the club hosted a horse show with "nearly 200 entries ... from all parts of England".

By mid-May, all the first-team players apart from Sid Wharton and Billy Bennett had signed on for the coming season,; and those two later did so. Tom Farnall, who had had little first-team football, moved on to Watford, and Bob Cain, whose season had been ruined by injury, returned home to Sheffield. James Tebbs, an outside left, signed from Loughborough, and a number of young players joined the squad. The Dart took a positive view: "The Heathens mean making a great attempt to gain admission into the 'charmed circle' this season, and if they will only perform a little more consistently away from home I think they will just about accomplish the feat."

== Match details ==
=== Football League Second Division ===
| Date | League position | Opponents | Venue | Result | Score F–A | Scorers | Attendance |
|---|---|---|---|---|---|---|---|
| 2 September 1899 | 6th | Walsall | H | W | 3–2 | Wigmore 2, Wharton | 8,000 |
| 9 September 1899 | 3rd | Middlesbrough | A | W | 3–1 | McRoberts 3 | 10,000 |
| 16 September 1899 | 3rd | Chesterfield Town | H | W | 5–3 | McRoberts, Bennett 2, Main, Wilcox | 8,000 |
| 23 September 1899 | 1st | Gainsborough Trinity | A | W | 4–1 | McRoberts, Wharton, Bennett 2 | 2,000 |
| 30 September 1899 | 3rd | Bolton Wanderers | H | D | 0–0 | | 12,000 |
| 2 October 1899 | 2nd | Lincoln City | H | W | 5–0 | Wigmore 2, McRoberts 3 | 4,000 |
| 7 October 1899 | 1st | Loughborough | A | W | 2–1 | Main, Farnall | 2,500 |
| 14 October 1899 | 1st | Newton Heath | H | W | 1–0 | Main | 9,000 |
| 21 October 1899 | 2nd | Sheffield Wednesday | A | L | 0–4 | | 9,000 |
| 4 November 1899 | 1st | Burton Swifts | A | W | 3–0 | Archer pen, Wharton, McRoberts | 1,500 |
| 11 November 1899 | 1st | New Brighton Tower | A | D | 2–2 | Scrivens, Leake | 1,500 |
| 25 November 1899 | 3rd | Woolwich Arsenal | A | L | 0–3 | | 4,000 |
| 2 December 1899 | 2nd | Barnsley | H | W | 5–0 | Main, McRoberts, Wigmore 2, Leonard | 4,000 |
| 16 December 1899 | 2nd | Luton Town | H | W | 3–0 | Bennett 2, Scrivens | 2,000 |
| 23 December 1899 | 2nd | Burslem Port Vale | A | L | 0–3 | | 1,500 |
| 30 December 1899 | 4th | Walsall | A | L | 0–1 | | 3,000 |
| 6 January 1900 | 4th | Middlesbrough | H | W | 5–1 | McRoberts 2, Scrivens, Bennett, Bayley | 1,000 |
| 13 January 1900 | 4th | Chesterfield Town | A | D | 0–0 | | 1,500 |
| 20 January 1900 | 4th | Gainsborough Trinity | H | W | 8–1 | Wharton, McRoberts 3, Layton 2, Bennett, Main | 4,000 |
| 27 January 1900 | 4th | Burslem Port Vale | H | W | 2–1 | Aston, Leake | 4,000 |
| 3 February 1900 | 4th | Bolton Wanderers | A | D | 1–1 | McRoberts | 6,000 |
| 10 February 1900 | 2nd | Loughborough | H | W | 6–0 | Aston 3, Leake 2, Adey | 2,000 |
| 12 February 1900 | 3rd | Grimsby Town | H | L | 0–1 | | 2,000 |
| 17 February 1900 | 4th | Newton Heath | A | L | 2–3 | Aston, Wharton | 6,000 |
| 24 February 1900 | 3rd | Sheffield Wednesday | H | W | 4–1 | Layton, Wharton, Leake, Bennett | 9,000 |
| 10 March 1900 | 3rd | Burton Swifts | H | W | 2–0 | Leake, Aston | 5,000 |
| 17 March 1900 | 3rd | New Brighton Tower | H | W | 2–0 | Scrivens 2 | 5,000 |
| 24 March 1900 | 3rd | Grimsby Town | A | L | 0–2 | | 5,000 |
| 31 March 1900 | 3rd | Woolwich Arsenal | H | W | 3–1 | Leake, McRoberts, Aston | 3,000 |
| 7 April 1900 | 3rd | Barnsley | A | D | 1–1 | Leake | 2,000 |
| 13 April 1900 | 3rd | Lincoln City | A | D | 0–0 | | 5,000 |
| 14 April 1900 | 3rd | Leicester Fosse | H | W | 4–1 | McRoberts, Wharton, Main, Wragg og | 6,000 |
| 17 April 1900 | 3rd | Leicester Fosse | A | L | 0–2 | | 6,000 |
| 21 April 1900 | 3rd | Luton Town | A | W | 2–1 | Main, McRoberts | 1,000 |

Final Second Division table (part)
| Pos | Club | Pld | W | D | L | F | A | GA | Pts |
|---|---|---|---|---|---|---|---|---|---|
| 1 | Sheffield Wednesday | 34 | 25 | 4 | 5 | 84 | 22 | 3.82 | 54 |
| 2 | Bolton Wanderers | 34 | 22 | 8 | 4 | 69 | 25 | 3.16 | 52 |
| 3 | Small Heath | 34 | 20 | 6 | 8 | 78 | 38 | 2.05 | 46 |
| 4 | Newton Heath | 34 | 20 | 4 | 10 | 63 | 27 | 2.33 | 44 |
| 5 | Leicester Fosse | 34 | 17 | 9 | 8 | 53 | 36 | 1.47 | 43 |
Key: Pld = Matches played; W = Matches won; D = Matches drawn; L = Matches lost; F = Goals for; A = Goals against; GA = Goal average; Pts = Points

=== FA Cup ===
| Round | Date | Opponents | Venue | Result | Score F–A | Scorers | Attendance |
|---|---|---|---|---|---|---|---|
| 3rd qual | 28 October 1899 | Oswestry United | H | W | 10–2 | Scrivens 2, Wharton 2, Main 2, Wigmore, McRoberts 2, Adey | 1,000 |
| 4th qual | 22 November 1899 | Wrexham | H | W | 6–1 | McRoberts 3, Scrivens 2, Wigmore | 1,500 |
| 5th qual | 9 December 1899 | Walsall | H | D | 0–0 | | 4,000 |
| 5th qual replay | 14 December 1899 | Walsall | A | L | 0–2 | | 1,000 |

=== Mayor of Birmingham's Charity Cup ===
| Round | Date | Opponents | Venue | Result | Score F–A | Scorers | Attendance | Ref |
|---|---|---|---|---|---|---|---|---|
| First | 13 September 1899 | Wolverhampton Wanderers | H | W | 5–0 | Main 2, McRoberts 2, Wilcox | Not known | |
| Semi-final | 26 September 1899 | Walsall | H | L | 2–3 | Scrivens, Wilcox | 1,500 | |

=== Birmingham Cup ===
| Round | Date | Opponents | Venue | Result | Score F–A | Scorers | Attendance | Ref |
|---|---|---|---|---|---|---|---|---|
| First round | 12 December 1898 | Wolverhampton Wanderers | A | L | 0–1 | | 2,000 | |

=== Staffordshire Cup ===
| Round | Date | Opponents | Venue | Result | Score F–A | Scorers | Attendance | Ref |
|---|---|---|---|---|---|---|---|---|
| First round | 10 October 1899 | Wolverhampton Wanderers | H | D | 2–2 | | | |
| First round replay | 16 October 1899 | Wolverhampton Wanderers | A | L | 0–8 | | 1,000 | |

=== Other matches ===
| Date | Opponents | Venue | Result | Score F–A | Scorers | Attendance | Notes |
|---|---|---|---|---|---|---|---|
| 23 October 1899 | Everton | H | W | 6–2 | Main, McRoberts 2, Wilcox, Adey, Not known | c. 1,000 | Friendly match in connection with Walter Abbott's transfer |
| 20 November 1899 | Bristol Rovers | A | L | 0–2 | | | Friendly match in connection with Jack Leonard's transfer |
| 26 December 1899 | Aston Villa | A | L | 2–5 | Scrivens, Not known | "Large" | Friendly match |
| 3 March 1900 | Reading | A | L | 0–1 | | 1,000 | Friendly match |
| 29 April 1900 | West Bromwich Albion | H | D | 1–1 | Aston | 1,500 | Friendly match |

== Appearances and goals ==
This table includes appearances and goals in nationally organised competitive matches – the Football League and FA Cup – only.
For a description of the playing positions, see Formation (association football)#2–3–5 (Pyramid).

Players' appearances and goals by competition
| Name | Position | League | | FA Cup | | Total | |
| Name | Position | Apps | Goals | Apps | Goals | Apps | Goals |
|---|---|---|---|---|---|---|---|
| Nat Robinson | Goalkeeper | 34 | 0 | 4 | 0 | 38 | 0 |
| Arthur Archer | Full back | 34 | 1 | 4 | 0 | 38 | 1 |
| Frank Lester | Full back | 2 | 0 | 0 | 0 | 2 | 0 |
| Billy Pratt | Full back | 31 | 0 | 4 | 0 | 35 | 0 |
| George Adey | Half back | 32 | 1 | 3 | 1 | 35 | 1 |
| Thomas Farnall | Half back | 19 | 1 | 4 | 0 | 23 | 1 |
| George Layton | Half back | 11 | 3 | 0 | 0 | 11 | 3 |
| Alex Leake | Half back | 29 | 8 | 4 | 0 | 33 | 8 |
| Thomas Oakes | Half back | 2 | 0 | 0 | 0 | 2 | 0 |
| Walter Wigmore | Half back | 26 | 6 | 3 | 2 | 29 | 8 |
| Jack Aston | Forward | 15 | 7 | 0 | 0 | 15 | 7 |
| Sam Bayley | Forward | 1 | 1 | 0 | 0 | 1 | 1 |
| Billy Bennett | Forward | 24 | 9 | 1 | 0 | 25 | 9 |
| Samuel Cole | Forward | 1 | 0 | 0 | 0 | 1 | 0 |
| Jack Leonard | Forward | 7 | 1 | 2 | 0 | 9 | 1 |
| Bob McRoberts | Forward | 30 | 19 | 4 | 5 | 34 | 24 |
| Walter Main | Forward | 20 | 7 | 4 | 2 | 24 | 9 |
| Tom Scrivens | Forward | 13 | 5 | 3 | 4 | 16 | 9 |
| Billy Walton | Forward | 3 | 0 | 0 | 0 | 3 | 0 |
| Sid Wharton | Forward | 34 | 7 | 4 | 2 | 38 | 9 |
| Harry Wilcox | Forward | 6 | 1 | 0 | 0 | 6 | 1 |
