= 1901–02 Small Heath F.C. season =

Small Heath F.C.
1901–02 season
- Chairman: Walter W. Hart
- Secretary-manager: Alf Jones
- Ground: Coventry Road
- Football League First Division: 17th
- FA Cup: First round (eliminated by Portsmouth)
- Birmingham Senior Cup: First round (eliminated by Aston Villa)
- Top goalscorer: League: Bob McRoberts (19); All: Bob McRoberts (24)
- Highest home attendance: 23,000 vs Aston Villa, 12 October 1901
- Lowest home attendance: 8,000 vs Stoke, 17 February 1902
- Average home league attendance: 15,412
Home colours

The 1901–02 Football League season was Small Heath Football Club's tenth in the Football League and their third in the First Division, having been promoted as runners-up in the Second Division in 1900–01. They finished in 17th place in the 18-team league, one point away from safety, so were relegated back to the Second Division. They also took part in the 1901–02 FA Cup, entering at the intermediate round (between qualifying rounds and rounds proper) and losing in that round to Portsmouth. In locally organised competition, they lost to Aston Villa in the first round of the Birmingham Senior Cup.

Twenty-six players made at least one appearance in nationally organised first-team competition, and there were eleven different goalscorers. Goalkeeper Nat Robinson was ever-present over the 35-match season; full-back Archie Goldie and half-back Alex Leake each missed only one match. Bob McRoberts was leading scorer with 24 goals, of which 19 came in the league.

== Football League First Division ==
Date	League position	Opponents	Venue	Result	Score F–A	Scorers	Attendance
2 September 1901	5th	Liverpool	H	D	0–0		12,000
7 September 1901	3rd	Bolton Wanderers	H	W	2–0	Aston, McRoberts	15,000
14 September 1901	1st	Manchester City	A	W	4–1	Aston 2, McRoberts, McMillan	23,000
21 September 1901	3rd	Wolverhampton Wanderers	H	L	1–2	Aston	16,000
28 September 1901	6th	Liverpool	A	L	1–3	McMillan	20,000
5 October 1901	5th	Newcastle United	H	W	3–1	Aston, McMillan, McRoberts	12,000
12 October 1901	7th	Aston Villa	H	L	0–2		23,000
19 October 1901	5th	Sheffield United	H	W	5–1	McMillan 2, Athersmith, Jones, McRoberts	20,000
26 October 1901	5th	Nottingham Forest	A	D	1–1	Jones	10,000
2 November 1901	3rd	Bury	H	W	1–0	Wigmore	15,000
9 November 1901	6th	Blackburn Rovers	A	L	1–3	Archer pen	6,000
23 November 1901	11th	Everton	A	L	0–1		15,000
30 November 1901	12th	Sunderland	H	L	2–3	McMillan, Murray	18,000
7 December 1901	14th	Grimsby Town	A	L	0–1		8,000
21 December 1901	14th	Sheffield Wednesday	H	D	1–1	Leonard	12,000
26 December 1901	14th	Aston Villa	A	L	0–1		40,000
28 December 1901	15th	Notts County	A	L	1–6	Leonard	8,000
4 January 1902	16th	Bolton Wanderers	A	L	0–4		6,583
11 January 1902	16th	Manchester City	H	W	1–0	McRoberts pen	20,000
18 January 1902	17th	Wolverhampton Wanderers	A	L	1–2	McRoberts	5,000
1 February 1902	17th	Newcastle United	A	L	0–2		13,000
15 February 1902	17th	Sheffield United	A	W	4–1	McRoberts, Field, Leonard, Wharton	9,000
17 February 1902	16th	Stoke	H	D	1–1	Athersmith	8,000
22 February 1902	15th	Grimsby Town	H	W	6–0	Field 2, Leonard, McRoberts, Wigmore, McConnell og	16,000
1 March 1902	16th	Bury	A	L	0–2		6,000
8 March 1902	15th	Blackburn Rovers	H	W	2–0	Wharton 2	15,000
15 March 1902	16th	Stoke	A	L	0–1		4,000
22 March 1902	16th	Everton	H	L	0–1		15,000
29 March 1902	17th	Sunderland	A	D	1–1	Athersmith	8,000
31 March 1902	17th	Derby County	A	D	0–0		7,000
5 April 1902	17th	Nottingham Forest	H	D	1–1	Athersmith	15,000
12 April 1902	17th	Derby County	H	W	5–1	Leonard 2, McMillan, McRoberts, Wharton	10,000
19 April 1902	17th	Sheffield Wednesday	A	W	2–1	McRoberts, Wharton	10,000
26 April 1902	17th	Notts County	H	D	0–0		20,000

=== League table (part) ===
Final First Division table (part)
Pos	Club	Pld	W	D	L	F	A	GA	Pts
14th	Wolverhampton Wanderers	34	13	6	15	46	57	0.81	32
15th	Grimsby Town	34	13	6	15	44	60	0.73	32
16th	Stoke	34	11	9	14	45	55	0.82	31
17th	Small Heath	34	11	8	15	47	45	1.04	30
18th	Manchester City	34	11	6	17	42	58	0.72	28
Key	Pos = League position; Pld = Matches played; W = Matches won; D = Matches drawn; L = Matches lost; F = Goals for; A = Goals against; GA = Goal average; Pts = Points								
Source									

== FA Cup ==
Round	Date	Opponents	Venue	Result	Score F–A	Scorers	Attendance
Intermediate round	7 February 1902	Portsmouth	A	L	1–2	McRoberts	15,000

== Appearances and goals ==
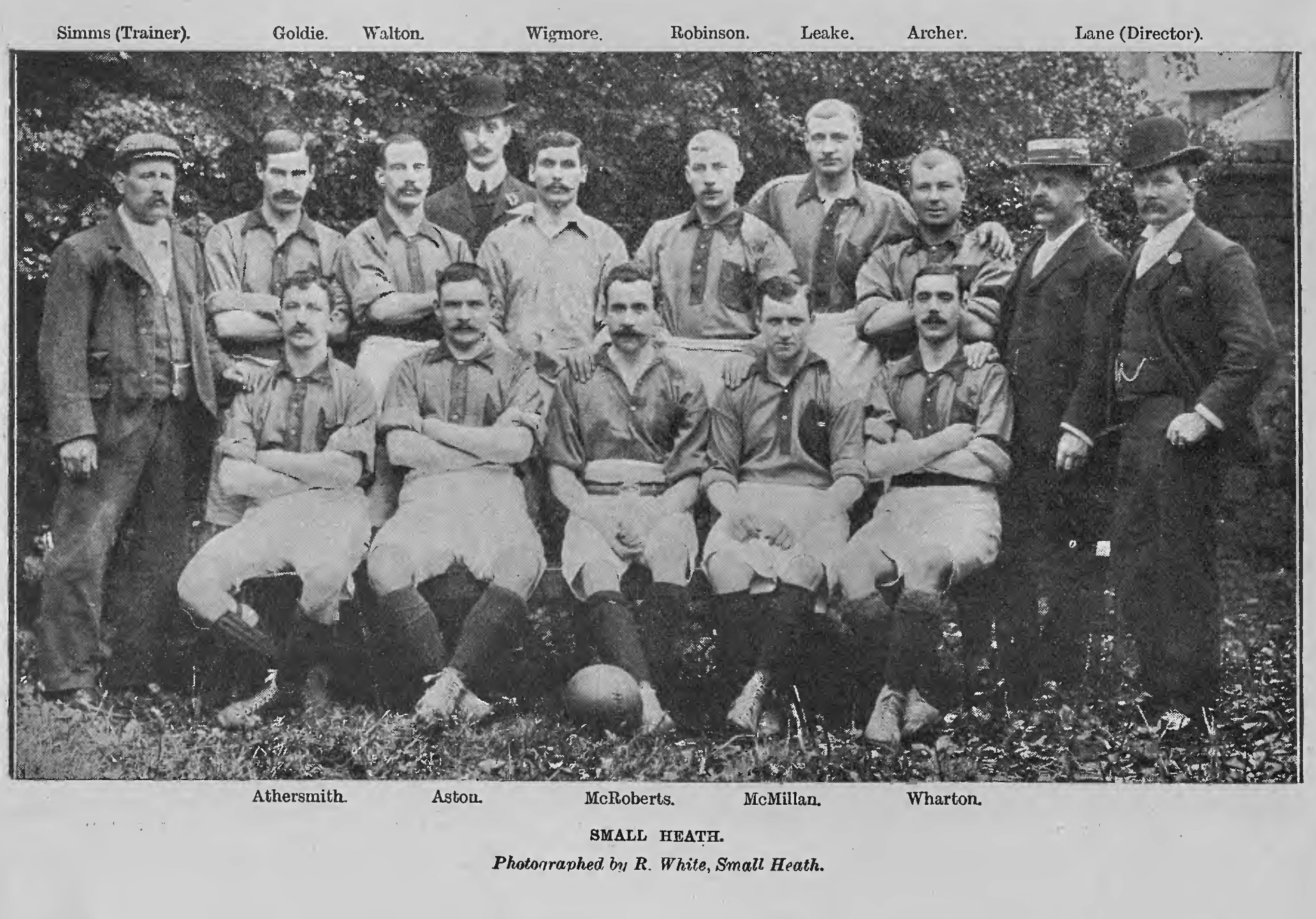
Small Heath F.C., from the Golden Penny Football Album 1901–1902

This table includes appearances and goals in nationally organised competitive matches – the Football League and FA Cup – only.
For a description of the playing positions, see Formation (association football)#2–3–5 (Pyramid).
Players marked † left the club during the playing season.

Players' appearances and goals by competition
Name	Position	League		FA Cup		Total	
Name	Position	Apps	Goals	Apps	Goals	Apps	Goals
Nat Robinson	Goalkeeper	34	0	1	0	35	0
Arthur Archer †	Full back	24	1	0	0	24	1
Walter Bunch	Full back	2	0	1	0	3	0
Archie Goldie	Full back	33	0	1	0	34	0
Billy Pratt	Full back	1	0	0	0	1	0
Harold Wassell	Full back	7	0	0	0	7	0
George Adey	Half back	13	0	1	0	13	0
Billy Beer	Half back	12	0	0	0	12	0
Jim Dougherty	Half back	2	0	0	0	2	0
Ambrose Hartwell	Half back	4	0	0	0	4	0
Alex Leake	Half back	33	0	1	0	34	0
Billy Walton	Half back	11	0	0	0	11	0
Walter Wigmore	Half back	28	2	1	0	29	2
Jack Aston	Forward	11	5	1	0	12	5
Charlie Athersmith	Forward	32	4	1	0	33	4
Billy Bennett †	Forward	3	0	0	0	3	0
Oakey Field	Forward	10	3	0	0	10	3
Jack Higginson	Forward	3	0	0	0	3	0
Billy Jones	Forward	4	2	0	0	4	2
Arthur Leonard	Forward	20	6	0	0	20	6
John McMillan	Forward	24	7	0	0	24	7
Bob McRoberts	Forward	32	10	1	1	33	11
Jimmy Murray	Forward	1	0	0	0	1	0
Fred Pentland	Forward	0	0	1	0	1	0
James Tebbs	Forward	1	1	0	0	1	1
Sid Wharton	Forward	29	5	1	0	30	5

== See also ==
- Birmingham City F.C. seasons
