= John Thornley =

John Thornley may refer to:

- John Thornley (footballer, born 1885) (1885–1918), English footballer for Glossop and Manchester United
- John Thornley (footballer, born 1875) (1875–1956), English footballer for Gainsborough Trinity and Nottingham Forest
