= Jack Higginson =

Jack Higginson may refer to:

- Jack Higginson (athlete) (1891–1966), British Olympic athlete
- Jack Higginson (footballer) (1876–?), English footballer
- Jack Higginson (rugby league) (born 1997), rugby league footballer

== See also ==
- John Higginson (disambiguation)
