= Marc Faber =

Swiss investor based in Thailand

- Born: February 28, 1946 (age 80); Zurich, Switzerland
- Education: University of Zurich (PhD)
- Occupation: Investor

Marc Faber (born February 28, 1946; nicknamed "Dr. Doom") is a Swiss investor based in Thailand. He is the publisher of the Gloom Boom & Doom Report newsletter, and the director of Marc Faber Ltd, which acts as an investment advisor and fund manager. Faber also serves as director, advisor, and shareholder of a number of investment funds that focus on emerging and frontier markets, including Asia Frontier Capital Ltd.'s AFC Asia Frontier Fund. Faber is credited for advising his clients to get out of the stock market before the October 1987 crash, and with in 2005-06 writing extensively about an impending crash of home prices, prior to the 2008 financial crisis. In 2017 he was criticized for racist remarks.

== Career ==
Faber was born in Zurich, Switzerland, and schooled in Zurich and Geneva, where he raced for the Swiss National Ski Team (B-Team). He studied economics at the University of Zurich and, at the age of 24, earned a Ph.D. degree in Economics, graduating magna cum laude.

During the 1970s, Faber worked for White Weld & Co. in New York City, Zurich, and Hong Kong. He moved to Hong Kong in 1973. He was also a managing director at Drexel Burnham Lambert Hong Kong from the beginning of 1978 until the firm's collapse in 1990. In 1990, he set up his own business, Marc Faber Limited. Faber now resides in Chiang Mai, Thailand, though he keeps a small office in Hong Kong.

== Investment views ==
=== In 1980s ===
Faber is credited for advising his clients to get out of the stock market before the October 1987 crash.

=== In 2000s ===
In 2001, Faber told investors to buy gold; it then more than doubled. He correctly predicted a decline in the US dollar since 2002.

In 2005-06, Faber wrote extensively about an impending crash of home prices.

In May 2006 Faber said he would advise Swiss pension funds to move assets out of the US, because the Fed had “created bubbles all over the place that could lead to one volcanic eruption after the other”.

Faber in 2007 correctly predicted the rise of oil, precious metals, other commodities, emerging markets, and especially China in his book Tomorrow's Gold: Asia's Age of Discovery. He stated that there are few value investments available, except for farmland and real estate in some emerging markets like Russia, Paraguay, and Uruguay.

He also expressed temporary bullishness for the U.S. dollar in mid-2008, before it dramatically recovered and positive expectations for holding the Japanese yen. In December 2008, Faber said, "I think a recovery will not come in the next couple of years, maybe in five, 10 years' time". His prediction was incorrect. Subsequently, the S&P 500 index rose by 48% from 865.58 on January 1, 2009 to 1282.62 on January 1, 2011.

In 2009, Faber predicted with 100% confidence that the Federal Reserve's policy of keeping interest rates near zero would lead to hyperinflation approaching levels seen in Zimbabwe. Zimbabwe's inflation rate reached 89 sextillion percent in a previous report. His prediction was incorrect. Subsequently, annual increases in the CPI were 2.7% in 2009, 1.5% in 2010, 3.0% in 2011, 1.7% in 2012, 1.5% in 2013, 0.8% in 2014 and 0.7% in 2015.

=== In 2010s ===
In 2012, Faber claimed that there was a "100% chance" of a global economic recession later that year or in early 2013. His prediction was incorrect. Subsequently, the average world product grew steadily by 3.4% in each of 2012, 2013 and 2014, and 3.5% in 2015.

In 2012, Faber predicted that the S&P 500 index would fall at least 20% within 6–9 months following the re-election of Barack Obama. His prediction was incorrect. Subsequently, the S&P 500 index rose from a low of 1359.88 on November 16, 2012 to 1480.40 as of January 1, 2013, 1570.70 on April 1, 2013 (up 15% from the November low, 6 months after Faber's prediction), 1668.68 on July 1, 2013 (up 22% from the November 2012 low) and 1783.54 on November 1, 2013 (up 31%).

On March 27, 2013, Faber said that the U.S. was creating nowhere-to-hide bubbles in many emerging economies such as Indonesia, Philippines, and Thailand (up four times from 2009 lows).

On January 14, 2015, Faber predicted that gold prices would rise by 30% in 2015. His prediction was incorrect. Gold prices subsequently fell by 14% from $1234 on January 14, 2015 to $1060 on December 31, 2015.

On July 23, 2015, Faber stated that investors must hold cash for better buying opportunities after correction.

== Writings ==
Faber writes the monthly paper investment newsletter The Gloom Boom & Doom Report, as well as the online subscription letter "Monthly Market Commentary". He has also authored several books, such as The Great Money Illusion; The Confusion Of The Confusions (1988), Riding the Millennial Storm: Marc Faber's Path to Profit in the Financial Markets (1998) and Tomorrow's Gold: Asia's Age of Discovery (2010).

Faber has been a contributor to Forbes and International Wealth (a sister publication of the Financial Times). He has contributed regularly to several websites such as Financial Intelligence, Asian Bond Portal, Die Welt, Finanzen, Boerse, AME Info, Swiss Radio, Apple Hong Kong and Taiwan, Quamnet, Winners, Wealth and Oriental Daily. He has also written occasionally for the International Herald Tribune, Wall Street Journal, and Borsa e Finanza.

Faber has been long-term bearish about the American economy for a number of years, and continues to be so. He concluded his June 2008 newsletter with the following mock quote:

The federal government is sending each of us a $600 rebate. If we spend that money at Wal-Mart, the money goes to China. If we spend it on gasoline it goes to the Arabs. If we buy a computer it will go to India. If we purchase fruit and vegetables it will go to Mexico, Honduras and Guatemala. If we purchase a good car it will go to Germany. If we purchase useless crap it will go to Taiwan and none of it will help the American economy. The only way to keep that money here at home is to spend it on prostitutes and beer, since these are the only products still produced in US. I've been doing my part.

== Controversies ==
Faber drew criticism on October 17, 2017, for racist remarks made in his investment newsletter. In the October edition of Faber's Gloom, Doom and Boom Report, he criticized "liberal hypocrites" and ongoing efforts to tear down "monuments of historic personalities." He opined that the U.S. grew successful because white people held power. "Thank God white people populated America, and not the blacks," Faber wrote, according to an excerpt of the newsletter quoted by Business Insider. "Otherwise, the U.S. would look like Zimbabwe, which it might look like one day anyway, but at least America enjoyed 200 years in the economic and political sun under a white majority. I am not a racist, but the reality – no matter how politically incorrect – needs to be spelled out as well." He further defended statues of prominent personalities from Confederate States of America, calling them "honorable people whose only crime was to defend what all societies had done for more than 5,000 years: keep a part of the population enslaved." Faber defended his comments in a subsequent statement to Business Insider, adding that he is "naturally standing by this comment since this is an indisputable fact". Faber also said: "If stating some historical facts makes me a racist, then I suppose that I am a racist. For years, Japanese were condemned because they denied the Nanking massacre".

Faber was subsequently asked to resign from the boards of several firms, including Ivanhoe Mines, Sprott Inc. and NovaGold Resources. Faber told Reuters he was dismissed from U.S-based Sunshine Silver Mining Corp, the Vietnam Growth Fund managed by Dragon Capital, and Indochina Capital Corporation. CNBC, Fox Business, and Bloomberg TV said that they did not plan to schedule future appearances from Faber. Faber continued to stand by his remarks.

== Books ==
- Tomorrow's Gold: Asia's Age of Discovery (2002)
- Riding the Millennial Storm: Marc Faber's Path to Profit in the Financial Markets, with Mani Kiran (1998)
- The Great Money Illusion; The Confusion Of The Confusions (1988)
