= Samuel Cole (footballer) =

English footballer

Personal information
- Full name: Samuel Cole
- Date of birth: September 1874
- Place of birth: Smethwick, England
- Date of death: Unknown
- Place of death: Birmingham, England
- Position: Forward

Senior career*
Years	Team	Apps	(Gls)
1896–1897	Stoke	0	(0)
1897–1898	Smethwick Centaur		
1898–1900	Small Heath	1	(0)
1900–19??	Harborne		
- * Club domestic league appearances and goals

Samuel Cole (September 1874 – after 1899) was an English professional footballer who played in the Football League for Small Heath.

== Career ==
Cole was born in Smethwick, Staffordshire. He was on the books of Stoke as an amateur, but never appeared for the first team, and then played for Smethwick Centaur before joining Small Heath in August 1898. Cole was a regular in the reserves, playing in all forward positions, but played only once for the first team. This occurred on 10 March 1900, when Cole was a spectator at the Second Division game at home to Burton Swifts. Centre-forward Bob McRoberts dropped out at the last minute, and twelfth man Billy Walton had travelled with the reserves, so Cole was called out of the crowd to play. Small Heath won 2–1. At the end of the 1899–1900 season, Cole returned to local non-league football with Harborne.

== Career statistics ==
Club	Season	League			FA Cup		Total	
Club	Season	Division	Apps	Goals	Apps	Goals	Apps	Goals
Stoke	1896–97	First Division	0	0	0	0	0	0
Small Heath	1899–1900	Second Division	1	0	0	0	1	0
Career total			1	0	0	0	1	0
