= Isaac Webb =

Isaac Webb may refer to:

- Ike Webb (1874–1950), English football goalkeeper
- Isaac Webb (shipbuilder) (1794–1840), American shipbuilder
- Isaac Webb (pilot boat), 19th-century pilot boat
