= Scriven (surname) =

Scriven is a surname, and may refer to:

- Aubrey Scriven (1904–1988), English professional footballer.
- Augustine Scriven (1852–1916), Anglican priest.
- Charles Scriven (born 1945), Seventh-day Adventist theologian.
- Dominic Scriven (born 1963), British investor.
- Edward Scriven (1775–1841), English engraver.
- George P. Scriven (1854–1940), Brigadier General and seventh Chief Signal Officer of the United States Army.
- George Scriven (1856–1931), Irish rugby union player.
- Henry William Scriven (born 1951), English Anglican bishop.
- Herbert Richard "Bert" Scriven (1908–2001), English professional footballer.
- Joseph M. Scriven (1819–1886), Irish poet.
- Lawrence L. E. Scriven (1931–2007), American Professor of Chemical Engineering
- Margaret Scriven (1912–2001), British tennis player.
- Mary Stenson Scriven (born 1962), United States federal judge.
- Michael Scriven (1928–2023), British-born polymath and academic.
- Paul Scriven Baron Scriven (born 1966), British politician.
- Peter Scriven (1930–1998), Founding artistic director of the Marionette Theatre of Australia.
- Tim Scriven (born 1965), British cricket player.
- Thomas Scriven (Blessed), Roman Catholic martyr.

== See also ==
- Scrivener
- Scrivens
