= Billy Bennett (footballer, born 1878) =

English footballer (1878–1953)

Personal information
- Full name: William Ambrose Bennett
- Date of birth: 24 June 1878
- Place of birth: Aston, England
- Date of death: 16 April 1953 (aged 74)
- Place of death: Coventry, England
- Height: 5 ft 11 1/2 in (1.82 m)
- Position: Outside right

Senior career*
Years	Team	Apps	(Gls)
1896–1901	Small Heath	70	(12)
- * Club domestic league appearances and goals

William Ambrose Bennett (24 June 1878 – 16 April 1953) was an English professional footballer who played mainly as an outside right. He made 70 appearances in the Football League playing for Small Heath.

== Personal life ==
William Ambrose Bennett was born in the Aston registration district of Warwickshire on 24 June 1878. He is variously reported as having attended Dixon Road Board School and Oakley Road School, both in Small Heath.

He was a keen participant in sports other than football: he was captain and later president of Coventry Golf Club, played golf and hockey to county standard, and also played cricket, tennis and table tennis. He became a freemason.

Bennett married Annie Louisa Taylor in 1906, at which time he was working as an engineer and living in Small Heath. He set up in business as a heating engineer in Coventry three years later. The couple had a son who followed him into the heating business. Bennett was actively involved with the company until his death, which took place at his Coventry home on 16 April 1953 at the age of 74.

== Football career ==
Bennett joined Second Division club Small Heath in 1896, and made his debut on 26 September away to Burton Swifts, playing at outside right after Bill Edwards was dropped and Jimmy Inglis moved to outside left. The match ended as a 1–1 draw and the Birmingham Daily Gazette described Bennett as "a smart and clever youth, who shoots and centres in capital style, and [whose] debut in the first eleven was decidedly promising." He kept his place for the return fixture, but that was his last first-team appearance for nearly two years. He was reported to have broken a leg while a Small Heath Reserves player.

He returned to first-team duty for the opening five matches of the 1898–99 season – which included three wins and a draw – and scored his first goal on 5 September in a 4–1 win against Lincoln City. However, he was then replaced by Inglis, and did not return to the side until March 1899, when he played eight matches and scored twice. He began the 1899–1900 season at outside right for the League team, scoring four times in five matches, but was again replaced. Illness and injury gave him a way back into the side in December. Playing at inside right, he scored twice in a 3–0 win against Luton Town, set up the third goal for Tom Scrivens with an "accurately-placed centre", and he and Jack Leonard were reported to have done "surprisingly well on the right wing". At the end of the year, the Sports Argus wrote that Bennett had "done better in the last few matches than he ever did in the outside position." He was a regular in the side to the end of the season, ending up with nine goals from 24 league matches and helping the team finish in third place.

Now fully established in the first team, Bennett missed only four matches over the 1900–01 season as Small Heath went one place better and were promoted to the First Division as runners-up. Halfway through the season, the Birmingham Weekly Post's "Half-Back" described Bennett as "on present form ... one of the most dangerous forwards on his side. He is tall, and at the same time well built, is clever, can run fast, and his centreing and shooting are alike excellent. He is still very young, and undoubtedly has a great future before him." His only goal came in the FA Cup. Small Heath achieved a draw away to First Division Stoke, and in the replay the scores were level at full-time, so a half-hour's extra time was played. After ten minutes, Bennett gave his team the lead with "a long shot from the wing, [that] passed just under the bar without giving Wilkes a chance." They held on to the lead, beat Burnley in the next round, and lost to reigning Football League champions and local rivals Aston Villa in the quarter-final only after a replay.

Bennett had strained the muscles of his right knee during the previous season and the injury was still bothering him ahead of the First Division campaign. He was able to play in the opening fixture, a goalless draw at home to Liverpool, but a kick on the same leg during the game resulted in an ulcer forming on the shin. In October he underwent surgery in Manchester. He played twice more in the First Division, but the leg remained an issue and he retired from the game.

However, Bennett re-signed for Small Heath in March 1903 with a view to making a comeback, and was expected to play for the reserves against Brierley Hill Alliance in the Birmingham League. Although that match was postponed because the pitch was unplayable, he did retake the field with the reserves the following week, but never returned to League football.

== Notes ==
Older print sources (e.g. Joyce (2004), p. 23, Matthews (1995), p. 72) list the William Bennett who played for Small Heath as born in Altrincham, Cheshire, in 1872 and playing for Crewe Alexandra before joining Small Heath. It would appear that they conflate two players: William Ambrose Bennett – who was born in 1878, so would have been 14 at the time a W.A. Bennett made his Football League debut for Crewe – and the player listed by the English National Football Archive (ENFA) as William Arthur Bennett, birth registered in Northwich, Cheshire, in Q4 1871.

== Sources ==
- Joyce, Michael (2004). Football League Players' Records 1888 to 1939. Nottingham: SoccerData. ISBN 978-1-899468-67-6.
- Matthews, Tony (1995). Birmingham City: A Complete Record. Derby: Breedon Books. ISBN 978-1-85983-010-9.
- Matthews, Tony (2010). Birmingham City: The Complete Record. Derby: Derby Books. ISBN 978-1-85983-853-2.
