= Scrivens =

Scrivens is a surname, and may refer to:

- Ben Scrivens (born 1986), Canadian ice hockey goaltender
- Brian Scrivens (1937–2025), Welsh rugby union, and rugby league footballer of the 1950s and 1960s
- Jean Scrivens (born 1935), British track and field athlete
- Steve Scrivens (born 1957), English professional footballer
- Tom Scrivens (1876 – after 1899), English professional footballer

== See also ==
- Scriven (surname)
- Scrivener
