= Vietnam Enterprise Investments =

Cayman Islands-registered investment trust

Vietnam Enterprise Investments Limited
- Type: Public
- Traded as: LSE: VEIL; FTSE 250 component
- Industry: investment management
- Founded: 1995; 31 years ago
- Headquarters: United Kingdom
- Key people: Sarah Arkle (Chairman)
- Parent: Dragon Capital
- Website: www.veil.uk//

Vietnam Enterprise Investments Limited is a Cayman Islands-registered, closed-end investment trust managed by Dragon Capital. It is invested in listed equity on the Ho Chi Minh and Hanoi stock exchanges in Vietnam.

The Bill and Melinda Gates Foundation is the largest shareholder, owning 15.40% of the company, followed by Inter Fund Management SA, which owns 15.08%, and City of London Investment Management Company, which owns an 5.38% stake.

== History ==
Vietnam Enterprise Investments was established in 1995, and listed on the London Stock Exchange (LSE). The fund is a constituent of the FTSE 250 Index with a net asset value of US$1.79bn (unaudited December 2024). The chairman is Sarah Arkle. The lead portfolio manager is Tuan Le.

== Investments ==
As of 31 December 2024, its top 10 investments were:

Company name	Ticker	Percentage of net asset value
Mobile World	HOSE: MWG	8.1%
FPT Corporation	HOSE: FPT	8.1%
VP Bank	HOSE: VPB	7.0%
Asia Commercial Bank	HOSE: ACB	5.9%
Vietcombank	HOSE: VCB	5.2%
Techcombank	HOSE: TCB	5.2%
Hoa Phat Group	HOSE: HPG	5.1%
VietinBank	HOSE: CTG	4.7%
Khang Dien House	HOSE: KDH	4.0%
Duc Giang Chemicals	HOSE: DGC	3.7%
