= John Higginson =

John Higginson may refer to:

- John Higginson (fellow) (fl. 1561–1622), founding fellow of Jesus College, Oxford and clergyman
- John Higginson (minister) (1616–1708), English-born Massachusetts Puritan clergyman
- John Higginson (shipowner) (1776-1834), partner in Barton, Irlam and Higginson of Liverpool and Barbados
- John Higginson (entrepreneur) (1839–1904), Anglo-Irish born Frenchman, miner, entrepreneur and adventurer who founded the Caledonian Company of the New Hebrides to colonise Vanuatu
- John Higginson, actor in High Road to China

== See also ==
- Jack Higginson (disambiguation)
