= Thomas Fletcher (footballer) =

English footballer

Personal information
- Full name: Thomas Wilberforce Fletcher
- Date of birth: 1878
- Place of birth: Wednesfield, England
- Date of death: Unknown
- Place of death: Wolverhampton, England
- Position: Inside left

Senior career*
Years	Team	Apps	(Gls)
- Willenhall
1900–1901	Small Heath	2	(0)
1901–1903	Cradley Heath St Luke's		
1903–19??	Bellswood Rangers		
- * Club domestic league appearances and goals

Thomas Wilberforce Fletcher (1878 – after 1902) was an English professional footballer who played in the Football League for Small Heath.

Born in Wednesfield, Staffordshire, Fletcher joined Second Division club Small Heath from Willenhall in 1900. He made his debut – as the third of five players used at inside left in the 1900–01 season – on 29 December 1900 in a 2–1 home win against Burslem Port Vale. Fletcher kept his place for the next game, but failed to impress, and returned to non-league football in the Black Country. He died in Wolverhampton.
