= Jack Price (footballer, born 1877) =

English footballer

Personal information
- Full name: John Leonard Price
- Date of birth: 1877
- Place of birth: Birmingham, England
- Date of death: Unknown
- Position: Forward

Youth career
- Shenstone BC

Senior career*
Years	Team	Apps	(Gls)
1897–1900	Small Heath	1	(0)
1900–1901	Watford	26	(6)
1901–1903	Doncaster Rovers	59	(17)
1903–1904	Stockport County	11	(1)
Total		97	(24)
- * Club domestic league appearances and goals

John Leonard Price (1877 – after 1908) was an English professional footballer who played in the Football League for Small Heath, Doncaster Rovers and Stockport County.

Price was born in Birmingham. He began his football career with Shenstone BC before joining Small Heath in August 1897. He was a regular in the reserve team in the Birmingham & District League, but only appeared once for the first team, playing at inside right in the last game of the 1898–99 season, a goalless draw away against Leicester Fosse in the Second Division. Price left the club after being charged with assaulting a railway station ticket collector. He went on to play for Watford in the Southern League before returning to the Football League with Doncaster Rovers and Stockport County. By 1909, he was reserve-team trainer at Fulham.
