= Tom Scrivens =

English footballer

Personal information
- Full name: Thomas Scrivens
- Date of birth: 1876
- Place of birth: Walsall, England
- Date of death: Unknown
- Position: Inside forward

Senior career*
Years	Team	Apps	(Gls)
- Walsall Star
- Smethwick Rovers
1897–1898	Small Heath	0	(0)
1898	Wellingborough		
1898–1900	Small Heath	13	(5)
1900	Northampton Town		
- * Club domestic league appearances and goals

Thomas Scrivens (1876 – after 1899) was an English professional footballer who played in the Football League for Small Heath. He played as an inside forward.

Scrivens was born in Walsall, Staffordshire. He first joined Small Heath in January 1897, but in 18 months with the club failed to play for the first team. In the 1898 close season he signed for Wellingborough, but was back with Small Heath by the start of the new season. He made his debut in the Second Division on 7 October 1899 in a 2–1 win at Loughborough. He played a number of games, both at his preferred position of inside right and at centre forward when Walter Wigmore was moved into defence, and formed an effective partnership with Bob McRoberts, but he lost his place to Jack Aston and was released at the end of the 1899–1900 season.

Scrivens went on to join Northampton Town of the Midland League. He began the season well, scoring goals both in the league and in cup competitions, until he sustained an injury in a collision with Hinckley Town's goalkeeper in an FA Cup 3rd qualifying round match at Hinckley. Scrivens was helped from the field by teammates and opponents as the game continued, but no ambulance was available. After the game, he was carried to the railway station on a stretcher and travelled back by train to Northampton, where he was admitted to hospital. The injury, a broken leg, put an end to his football career.
