= Walter Bunch =

English footballer

Personal information
- Full name: Walter Wilbert Swanson Bunch
- Date of birth: 15 August 1872
- Place of birth: Weston-super-Mare, England
- Date of death: 1937 (aged 64–65)
- Place of death: Somerset, England
- Position: Full back

Youth career
- Compton Colts

Senior career*
Years	Team	Apps	(Gls)
- Willenhall Institute
- Blakenhall
1895–1899	Wolverhampton Wanderers	7	(0)
–	Eastville Rovers		
1899–1901	Walsall	61	(0)
1901–1902	Small Heath	2	(0)
- * Club domestic league appearances and goals

Walter Wilbert Swanson Bunch (15 August 1872 – 1937) was an English professional footballer who made 70 appearances in the Football League playing for Wolverhampton Wanderers, Walsall and Small Heath.

Bunch was born in Weston-super-Mare, Somerset. A full back, he entered league football when he joined First Division side Wolverhampton Wanderers in August 1895. He made his Football League debut on 4 January 1896 in a 4–0 defeat at Bolton Wanderers. Only ever a reserve, he made just seven first-team appearances during four seasons with the club.

He moved to Walsall in the 1899 close season, and played regularly, making 61 appearances in two seasons. At the end of his second season, Walsall failed to gain re-election to the Football League, so he signed for a third Midlands club, Small Heath, in September 1901. He played three times in the 1901–02 season, deputising for established full-backs Archie Goldie and Arthur Archer, but was forced to retire in 1902, his career cut short by illness and injury.

He went on to run a pub in Dudley, and died in Somerset in 1937.
