= Arthur Gardner (footballer) =

English footballer

Personal information
- Full name: Arthur Edwin Gardner
- Date of birth: January 1878
- Place of birth: West Smethwick, England
- Date of death: Unknown
- Position: Inside forward

Senior career*
Years	Team	Apps	(Gls)
- Smethwick Hall
1898–1899	Small Heath	16	(9)
1899–1901	Oldbury Town		
1901–19xx	Oldbury Broadwell		
- * Club domestic league appearances and goals

Arthur Edwin Gardner (January 1878 – after 1900) was an English professional footballer who played in the Second Division of the Football League for Small Heath. He played as an inside forward.

Gardner was born in West Smethwick, Staffordshire, and played football for Smethwick Hall before joining Small Heath in 1898. He scored twice on his debut in a 9–0 defeat of Luton Town on 12 November 1898, and scored a further seven times in the club's next 17 games, but lost his place on the arrival of Walter Wigmore, and returned to non-league football with Oldbury Town and later with Oldbury Broadwell.
