= George Dougal =

Scottish footballer

Personal information
- Full name: George Dougal
- Date of birth: 1 March 1875
- Place of birth: Eyemouth, Scotland
- Date of death: 1941 (aged 65–66)
- Position: Winger

Senior career*
Years	Team	Apps	(Gls)
1896–1898	Hibernian	33	(10)
1898–1901	Manchester City	75	(13)
1901–1902	Glossop	9	(0)
Total		117	(23)
- * Club domestic league appearances and goals

George Dougal (1 March 1875 – 1941) was a Scottish footballer who played in the Football League for Glossop and Manchester City and in the Scottish Football League for Hibernian.
