= Jock Henderson (footballer, born 1871) =

Scottish footballer

Personal information
- Full name: John Neil Henderson
- Date of birth: 1871
- Place of birth: Dumfries, Scotland
- Date of death: 30 August 1930 (aged 58–59)
- Place of death: Maxwelltown, Scotland
- Position: Inside forward

Senior career*
Years	Team	Apps	(Gls)
18??–1895	5th Kirkcudbright Rifle Volunteers		
1895–1897	Celtic		
1897–1898	Victoria United		
1898–1900	Lincoln City	76	(9)
1900–1901	Leicester Fosse	13	(0)
1901–1902	Small Heath	4	(0)
1902–1905	Maxwelltown Volunteers		
1905–1906	Carlisle United		
1906–1910	Maxwelltown Volunteers		
1910	Annan United		
1910–19??	Nithsdale Wanderers		
- * Club domestic league appearances and goals

John Neil Henderson (1871 – 30 August 1930) was a Scottish professional footballer who played in the Scottish Football League for Celtic and in the Football League in England for Lincoln City, Leicester Fosse and Small Heath.

== Biography ==
Henderson was born in Dumfries. He began his football career with the 5th Kirkcudbright Rifle Volunteers before joining Celtic in 1895, where he made his debut in the Scottish Football League on 12 December 1896 as Celtic beat Clyde 4–1. He moved on to Victoria United of Aberdeen in May 1897, and a year later tried his luck in England with Lincoln City of the Second Division, making his Football League debut on 1 September 1898 in a 1–0 win at home to Barnsley. After scoring 10 goals in 82 appearances in all competitions (9 in 76 in the league), Henderson joined Leicester Fosse in December 1900, but stayed only three months before moving on to Small Heath. The club had hoped his arrival would strengthen their push for promotion, but he played only four times before returning home. Henderson played out his career in Scottish football, apart from a short spell with Carlisle United in the Lancashire Combination, continuing until at least his late thirties.

Henderson died in Maxwelltown, Dumfries, in 1930 aged about 59.
