= Sam Bayley =

English footballer

Personal information
- Full name: Samuel Bayley
- Date of birth: November 1878
- Place of birth: Rugby, England
- Place of death: Coventry, England
- Position: Inside forward

Senior career*
Years	Team	Apps	(Gls)
–	St Saviour's		
–	Rugby		
–	Leamington Town		
1899–1900	Small Heath	1	(1)
1900–19??	Leamington Town		
- * Club domestic league appearances and goals

Samuel Bayley (November 1878 – after 1899) was an English professional footballer who played in the Football League for Small Heath.

Bayley was born in Rugby, Warwickshire, and played for St Saviour's, Rugby and Leamington Town before joining Small Heath in 1899. An inside forward, he made his debut in the Second Division on New Year's Day 1900 in a home game against Middlesbrough which Small Heath won 5–1. Bayley scored one goal and contributed to two others, but never played for the club again, and left soon afterwards to return to Leamington. He died in Coventry, Warwickshire.
