= Ike Webb =

English footballer

Personal information
- Full name: Isaac Webb
- Date of birth: 10 October 1874
- Place of birth: Worcester, England
- Date of death: March 1950 (aged 75)
- Place of death: Birmingham, England
- Position: Goalkeeper

Senior career*
Years	Team	Apps	(Gls)
- St Clement's Rangers
- Berwick Rangers (Worcester)
- Worcester Olympic
- Evesham Town
- Wellington Town
1898–1901	Small Heath	6	(0)
1901–1904	West Bromwich Albion	96	(0)
1904–1907	Sunderland	22	(0)
1907–1908	Queens Park Rangers	10	(0)
- * Club domestic league appearances and goals

Isaac Webb (10 October 1874 – March 1950) was an English professional footballer who made 124 appearances in the Football League playing for Small Heath, West Bromwich Albion and Sunderland. He played as a goalkeeper. He also played in the Southern League for Queens Park Rangers.

== Playing career ==
Webb was born in Worcester. He played for a number of non-league clubs before joining Small Heath in 1898. He made his debut in the Second Division on 2 April 1898, deputising for Henry Clutterbuck in a 2–1 away win against Luton Town. Described as "a big, burly goalkeeper with outstanding reflexes, ... quick off his line", Webb played three more games at the end of the 1897–98 season, and one the following season. When Clutterbuck left in May 1898, Small Heath brought in the 20-year-old Nat Robinson as first-choice goalkeeper. Webb played once more for Small Heath, in September 1900 – the only game Robinson missed in his first three seasons – before leaving for West Bromwich Albion in May 1901.

He achieved regular first-team football with West Bromwich Albion. In his first season, he helped them to the Second Division title, and in three-and-a-half seasons with the club he played 96 league games. In December 1904, he joined Sunderland for a fee of £250. He appeared regularly for the remainder of the 1904–05 season, but when he fell behind first Tom Naisby and then Bob Ward in the pecking order, he left for Queens Park Rangers in 1907. He made his Southern League debut in March 1907, and retired from the game at the end of the 1907–08 season.

== Personal ==
Webb joined the Army, serving as a catering orderly in the West Yorkshire Regiment. He died in Dudley Road Hospital, Birmingham, in March 1950 at the age of 75.
