= Tom Naisby =

English footballer

Personal information
- Full name: Thomas Henry Naisby
- Date of birth: 12 March 1878
- Place of birth: Sunderland, England
- Date of death: 1927 (aged 48–49)
- Height: 5 ft 8 in (1.73 m)
- Position: Goalkeeper

Senior career*
Years	Team	Apps	(Gls)
1897–1898	Sunderland East End		
1898–1899	Sunderland	2	(0)
1899–1903	Sunderland West End		
1903–1905	Reading		
1905–1907	Sunderland	35	(0)
1907–1909	Leeds City	63	(0)
1909–1910	South Shields		
1910–1914	Luton Town		
1914–19??	Darlington		
- * Club domestic league appearances and goals

Thomas Henry Naisby (12 March 1878 – 1927) was an English professional footballer who played as a goalkeeper for Sunderland.
