= George Layton (footballer) =

English footballer

Personal information
- Date of birth: 1865
- Place of birth: Stourbridge, England
- Date of death: after 1902
- Position: Left half

Senior career*
| Years | Team | Apps | (Gls) |
- Stourbridge Royal
| 1896–1897 | Cradley Heath St Luke's | | |
| 1897–1898 | Smethwick Wesleyan Rovers | | |
| 1898–1901 | Small Heath | 17 | (3) |
| 1901–1903 | Dudley Town | | |
| 1903–19?? | Soho Villa | | |
- * Club domestic league appearances and goals

George Layton (1865 – after 1902) was an English professional footballer who played in the Football League for Small Heath. He played as a left half.

Layton was born in Stourbridge, Worcestershire, and played local football before joining Small Heath in September 1898. He made his debut in the Second Division on 18 February 1899, deputising for William Robertson in a home game against New Brighton Tower which resulted in a 3–2 win. Layton, an attacking half-back, featured regularly in the second half of the 1899–1900 season, but the arrival of Walter Wigmore as first-choice centre-half meant Alec Leake moved to the left side and Layton lost his place. He then returned to non-league football.
