= Dragon Capital =

Financial institution in Vietnam

Dragon Capital Group
- Industry: Asset management
- Founded: 1994
- Headquarters: 1501 Me Linh Point, 2 Ngo Duc Ke Street, District 1, Ho Chi Minh City, Vietnam.
- Key people: Dominic Scriven (Chairman); Dr. Tuan Le Anh (CIO)
- Products: Investment management
- Total assets: Public Equity, Fixed Income, Clean Technology
- Website: dragoncapital.com

Dragon Capital Group is an integrated investment platform focused on Vietnam and other Southeast Asian emerging markets.

== History ==
Founded in 1994, from an initial base of US$16m, Dragon Capital has offices in Ho Chi Minh City and Hanoi (SSC registered) in Vietnam as well as Bangkok, Hong Kong (SFC registered) and the UK (FCA registered). Its largest fund, Vietnam Enterprise Investments Limited, was launched in 1995 and trades on the Main Market of the London Stock Exchange.

Dragon Capital established Vietnam's first domestic asset management company Vietnam Fund Management in 2003 and amalgamated the company into DCVFM in 2020 which is now part of the Dragon Capital Group. Dragon Capital is a shareholder in Ho Chi Minh City Securities Company which began operations in 2003.

In December 2021, Dragon Capital announced that it had expanded to Bangladesh with a joint venture called Green Delta Dragon Asset Management Company.
