= Dominic Scriven =

British investor

Dominic Scriven OBE
- Born: September 18, 1963 (age 63)
- Other name: DoM
- Education: University of Exeter; Hanoi General University
- Occupations: Chairman of Dragon Capital; President of WildLife At Risk
- Known for: Co-founder of Dragon Capital

Dominic Scriven is the founder and current chairman of Dragon Capital, a Vietnam-focused asset management firm and one of the largest investment managers operating in Vietnam. Since the early 1990s, Scriven has been a prominent figure in the development of Vietnam’s capital markets and has been widely cited for his long-term commitment to the country’s financial sector.

== Biography ==
Scriven was born in the United Kingdom. Scriven graduated with a combined honours degree in sociology and law from the University of Exeter in England. During his early career he worked in finance positions in the City of London with Vickers, da Costa and in Hong Kong with Sun Hung Kai Properties.

In 1994 he co-founded Dragon Capital at a time when Vietnam had no stock exchange and its financial markets were in an early stage of development. The firm began with a small team and approximately US$16 million in assets under management. Over the following decades, Dragon Capital expanded alongside Vietnam’s economic liberalisation and the establishment of its capital markets, including the opening of the Ho Chi Minh City Stock Exchange in 2000.

In 2006 he was awarded the Order of the British Empire and in 2014, he was awarded the Labor Order award, third class, by the Vietnamese president Trương Tấn Sang. Scriven was a director on the board of the Asia Commercial Bank. Scriven is a co-producer of the Vietnamese motion picture "Tunnel: Sun in the Dark."

== Views and perspectives ==
Scriven is known for articulating long-term, structural views on Vietnam’s economy and financial markets. He has frequently emphasized that Vietnam’s growth should be assessed over decades rather than short-term market cycles.

He has argued that periods of foreign investor withdrawal from Vietnamese equities are often driven by global macroeconomic pressures, including geopolitical instability, monetary tightening, and capital repatriation to developed markets. In his view, such phases do not necessarily reflect Vietnam’s underlying economic fundamentals and may create opportunities for domestic and long-term investors.

Scriven has also noted structural challenges within Vietnam’s stock market, including profit stagnation among large-cap companies during certain periods and the need for clearer communication of policy direction to international investors. At the same time, he has expressed confidence in Vietnam’s prospects, citing improving corporate earnings, relatively moderate valuations, and macroeconomic stabilization.

On corporate governance and sustainability, Scriven has supported the integration of environmental, social, and governance (ESG) principles into investment practices. Dragon Capital adopted ESG-related frameworks following investment by the International Finance Corporation (IFC) in 2001, an event Scriven later described as influential in shaping the firm’s internal systems and standards.

== Philanthropy and cultural activities ==
In 2019, Scriven funded the Dragon Chair in Biodiversity Economics at the University of Exeter, supporting academic research at the intersection of economics, conservation, and sustainability. His philanthropic interests include biodiversity protection and efforts to combat illegal wildlife trafficking.

He has supported Vietnamese art and served as a co-producer of the film The Tunnels: The Sun in the Dark, a historical drama depicting the experiences of soldiers in the Cu Chi tunnels during the Vietnam War.

== Personal life ==
Scriven collects Vietnamese socialist realist art and established a wildlife conservation organisation. Scriven has no children and resides in a villa in Ho Chi Minh City's District 2. He also owns an eco-resort at Phu Quoc.

He is fluent in Vietnamese.
