= Jack Leonard (footballer) =

English footballer

Personal information
- Full name: John Leonard
- Date of birth: 1876
- Place of birth: Gloucester, England
- Date of death: Unknown
- Position: Outside right

Senior career*
Years	Team	Apps	(Gls)
- Bedminster
- Bristol City
1899–1900	Small Heath	7	(1)
1900–19??	Cheltenham Town		
- * Club domestic league appearances and goals

John Leonard (1876 – after 1899) was an English professional footballer who played in the Football League for Small Heath.

Leonard was born in Gloucester. A clever dribbler on the right wing, he had a fine season in the Southern League with Bedminster, but fell out of favour and joined Small Heath in November 1899. He went straight into the starting eleven, making his debut in the Football League Second Division on 11 November in a 3–0 defeat at New Brighton Tower. He was given a run of nine games in league and FA Cup, but then lost his place, and returned to the West Country with Cheltenham Town at the end of the 1899–1900 season.
