= James Tebbs =

English footballer

Personal information
- Date of birth: May 1878
- Place of birth: Melton Mowbray, England
- Date of death: Unknown
- Position: Outside left

Senior career*
Years	Team	Apps	(Gls)
1898–1900	Loughborough	33	(5)
1900–1902	Small Heath	4	(1)
1902–19xx	Leicester United		
- * Club domestic league appearances and goals

James T. Tebbs (May 1878 – after 1901) was an English professional footballer who made 37 appearances in the Football League playing for Loughborough and Small Heath. He played as an outside left.

Tebbs was born in Melton Mowbray, Leicestershire. He played in the Second Division for Loughborough, and was the club's leading scorer – with only 4 goals out of the 18 they scored – in the 1899–1900 season, Loughborough's last in the Football League. He then joined Small Heath, but the form of Sid Wharton restricted Tebbs to four appearances in two years, and he then returned to Leicestershire to play non-league football for Leicester United.
