= John Thornley (footballer, born 1875) =

English footballer

Personal information
- Full name: John Fearn Thornley
- Date of birth: 8 August 1875
- Place of birth: Coalville, England
- Date of death: 1956 (aged 80–81)
- Position: Centre half

Senior career*
Years	Team	Apps	(Gls)
1886–1897	Hucknall St John's		
1897–1899	Nottingham Forest	6	(0)
1899–1902	Gainsborough Trinity	88	(0)
Total		94	(0)
- * Club domestic league appearances and goals

John Fearn Thornley (8 August 1875 – 1956) was an English footballer who played in the Football League for Gainsborough Trinity and Nottingham Forest.
