= Harry Wilcox =

English footballer (1878–1937)

- Wilcox as a Plymouth Argyle player

Personal information
- Full name: Harry Melbourne Wilcox
- Date of birth: 17 January 1878
- Place of birth: London, England
- Date of death: 21 July 1937 (aged 59)
- Place of death: Plymouth, England
- Position: Forward

Senior career*
Years	Team	Apps	(Gls)
- Bromsgrove Rovers
1898–1900	Small Heath	14	(3)
1900–1901	Watford	29	(2)
1901–1905	Preston North End	99	(42)
1905–1906	Plymouth Argyle	52	(22)
1906–1907	Leicester Fosse	44	(16)
1907–1908	West Bromwich Albion	17	(5)
1908–1920	Plymouth Argyle	259	(15)
Total		514	(105)
- * Club domestic league appearances and goals

Harry Melbourne Wilcox (17 January 1878 – 21 July 1937) was an English professional footballer who scored 66 goals in 174 appearances in the Football League playing for Small Heath, Preston North End, Leicester Fosse and West Bromwich Albion.

== Playing career ==
Wilcox was born in Dalston, London. A forward, he began his football career with Bromsgrove Rovers before joining Small Heath in September 1898. He made his debut in the Second Division on 17 September 1898 in a 3–1 win at home to Barnsley, and played 17 first-team games over the next two seasons, but never established himself in the side. At the end of the 1899–1900 season he joined Watford of the Southern League, and a season later returned to the Football League with Preston North End. His 14 goals made him Preston's leading scorer for 1901–02, and two years later he helped them win the Second Division title. After 42 goals in 99 league games, Wilcox moved back to the Southern League with Plymouth Argyle, where in one season he played 55 games in all competitions and finished as leading league goalscorer with 22. His performances were rewarded with selection for the Southern League's representative team.

Two seasons back in the Second Division, with Leicester Fosse and West Bromwich Albion, preceded the last move of his career, a return to Plymouth, in May 1908. In each of the seven seasons before the First World War put a stop to competitive football, Wilcox played at least 30 games. He contributed to Plymouth's runners-up spot in the Southern League in the 1911–12 season, and to their going one better the following season. In the latter part of his career he played at centre-half, which at that time was a midfield position. Wilcox made a return to first-team football after the war, playing four times in Plymouth's last Southern League season before their election to the Football League. His last competitive first-team appearance was on 18 October 1919, at the age of 41 years and 9 months, and he finally retired at the end of the 1919–20 season after scoring 41 goals in 325 games in all competitions for the club.

Wilcox died in Plymouth, Devon, in 1937 at the age of 59.

== Honours ==
with Preston North End

- Football League Second Division winners: 1903–04

with Plymouth Argyle

- Southern League winners: 1912–13
- Southern League runners-up: 1911–12
