= Henry Clutterbuck (footballer) =

English footballer

Personal information
- Full name: Henry James Clutterbuck
- Date of birth: June 1873
- Place of birth: Wheatenhurst, England
- Date of death: 19 February 1948 (aged 74)
- Place of death: Gloucester, England
- Position: Goalkeeper

Senior career*
| Years | Team | Apps | (Gls) |
| – | Hereford Thistle | | |
| 1897–1899 | Small Heath | 59 | (0) |
| 1899–1901 | Queens Park Rangers | 56 | (0) |
| 1901–1902 | Grimsby Town | 1 | (0) |
| 1902–1903 | Chesterfield | 29 | (0) |
| 1903–1904 | New Brompton | | |
| 1904–1905 | Fulham | 3 | (0) |
- * Club domestic league appearances and goals

Henry James Clutterbuck (June 1873 – 19 February 1948) was an English professional footballer who played as a goalkeeper. He made 89 appearances in the Football League playing for Small Heath, Grimsby Town and Chesterfield. He also played for Queens Park Rangers, New Brompton and Fulham in the Southern League. Clutterbuck was born in Wheatenhurst, Gloucestershire, and died in Gloucester.
