= Jack Higginson (footballer) =

English footballer

Personal information
- Full name: Jack Higginson
- Date of birth: 1876
- Place of birth: Dudley, England
- Date of death: Unknown
- Position: Forward

Senior career*
Years	Team	Apps	(Gls)
- Gornal Wood
- Dudley Town
1900–1902	Small Heath	14	(4)
1902–19??	Stourbridge		
- * Club domestic league appearances and goals

Jack Higginson (1876 – after 1901) was an English professional footballer who played in the Football League for Small Heath. He played as a left-sided forward.

Higginson was born in Dudley, which was then in Worcestershire, and played for Gornal Wood and Dudley Town before joining Small Heath in 1900. On his debut in the Second Division on 6 October 1900, Higginson scored the second goal in a 2–0 home win against Burton Swifts, and followed this up with goals in the next two games. Unable to maintain this level of goalscoring, Higginson lost his place to the newly arrived Johnny McMillan. He played only rarely after the club's promotion to the First Division, and returned to non-league football with Stourbridge in 1902.
