= Johnny McMillan =

Scottish footballer & manager (1871–1941)

Personal information
- Full name: John Stuart McMillan
- Date of birth: 16 February 1871
- Place of birth: Port Glasgow, Scotland
- Date of death: 4 November 1941 (aged 70)
- Place of death: Derby, England
- Position: Inside left

Senior career*
Years	Team	Apps	(Gls)
1887–1889	Port Glasgow Athletic	0	(0)
18??–1890	St Bernard's		
1890–1896	Derby County	116	(45)
1896–1900	Leicester Fosse	122	(43)
1900–1903	Small Heath	49	(24)
1903–1906	Bradford City	82	(24)
1906–1908	Glossop	27	(1)

Managerial career
- 1920–1922: Gillingham
- * Club domestic league appearances and goals

John Stuart McMillan (16 February 1871 – 4 November 1941) was a Scottish football player and manager. He made nearly 400 appearances in the Football League in the 1890s and 1900s, playing at inside left or centre forward.

== Playing career ==
McMillan was born in Port Glasgow. He began his career with home-town club Port Glasgow Athletic before joining Edinburgh-based club St Bernard's. He moved to England to join Derby County in 1890. In 1896 he moved to Leicester Fosse, before signing for Small Heath in January 1901.

He made his debut for the club in February 1901, and his 13 goals in the remaining 13 games of the 1900–01 season, which included the winning goal in four of those games, made a major contribution to Small Heath's securing runners-up spot in the Second Division and promotion to the First Division. Injury forced him to miss a part of the 1901–02 season, in which the club were relegated, and his contribution to their runners-up position in 1902–03 was severely curtailed by injury.

In 1903 he moved once again to Bradford City, who were entering the Football League for the first time. McMillan was selected as captain by his fellow players for Bradford in the club's first ever league match, a 2–0 defeat to Grimsby Town on 1 September 1903. He finished the 1903–04 season as the club's top scorer and played for two more seasons at City, scoring 24 goals in 82 league games, before moving to Glossop North End.

== Managerial career ==
McMillan returned to Birmingham as trainer in 1909. He went on to manage Gillingham from 1920 to 1922, and was the first man to take charge of the team in a Football League match, Gillingham having been elected to the league in 1920. This was his only professional managerial appointment, after which he left the game to run a pub in Derby. He died in Derby in 1941 at the age of 70.

McMillan's son Stuart was a footballer, Derbyshire cricketer, and manager of Derby County from 1946 to 1953.
