= Walter Main =

Scottish footballer

Personal information
- Full name: Walter Seymour Main
- Date of birth: 1875
- Place of birth: Motherwell, Scotland
- Date of death: Unknown
- Position: Inside left

Senior career*
| Years | Team | Apps | (Gls) |
| 189?–1899 | Airdrieonians | | |
| 1899–1901 | Small Heath | 33 | (11) |
| 1901–19?? | St Bernard's | | |
- * Club domestic league appearances and goals

Walter Seymour Main (1875 – after 1901) was a Scottish professional footballer who played as an inside left. He scored 11 goals in 33 appearances in the Second Division of the English Football League playing for Small Heath.

Main was born in Motherwell, and played for Airdrieonians, before moving to England to join Small Heath in 1899. A creative player, he was unable to establish himself as a regular first-choice player despite a good goalscoring record, and was replaced by Johnny McMillan. He returned to Scotland to play for St Bernard's.
