= William Robertson (footballer, born 1874) =

Welsh footballer

Personal information
- Full name: William Robertson
- Date of birth: 8 April 1874
- Place of birth: Dumbarton, Scotland (Note: Earlier sources, including Matthews' Birmingham City: A Complete Record, incorrectly identified Robertson as born in Pontypool, Wales. This should have been incompatible with his participation in the Home Scots v Anglo-Scots trial match, given the strict eligibility criteria in place at the time.)
- Height: 5 ft 8 in (1.73 m)
- Positions: Inside forward; wing half

Senior career*
| Years | Team | Apps | (Gls) |
- Renfrew Victoria
| 1894–1896 | Abercorn | 25 | (12) |
| 1896–1899 | Small Heath | 92 | (14) |
| 1899–1902 | Bristol Rovers | | |
| 1902–1903 | Small Heath | 0 | (0) |
| 1903–190? | Bristol Rovers | | |
- Workington
- * Club domestic league appearances and goals

William Robertson (8 April 1874 – after 1904) was a Scottish professional footballer who played for Abercorn, Small Heath and Bristol Rovers between 1894 and 1903.

== Life and career ==
Robertson was born in Dumbarton, Scotland. He played football for Renfrew Victoria before joining Abercorn in 1894.

Robertson joined English First Division club Small Heath in February 1896, and played eight times before the team were relegated at the end of the season. Having started his career as an inside forward, he had more success after a switch to wing half, and made more than 100 appearances in all competitions for the club. According to the Bristol Mercury, writing when Robertson first joined Bristol Rovers in 1899, "Last season he was looked upon as the best half in the Small Heath team." While a Bristol Rovers player, in March 1900, Robertson took part in the Home Scots v Anglo-Scots trial match, alongside namesakes Tom Robertson and Tommy Robertson (Jacky Robertson had also been invited to play but had to call off). He later played for Workington.
