= George Adey =

English footballer

Personal information
- Date of birth: 1869
- Place of birth: Handsworth, England
- Place of death: Birmingham, England
- Positions: Wing half; inside forward

Senior career*
Years	Team	Apps	(Gls)
- Bournbrook
- Stourbridge
1898–1902	Small Heath	71	(1)
1902–19??	Kettering		
- * Club domestic league appearances and goals

George W. Adey (1869 – after 1901) was an English professional footballer born in Handsworth, Birmingham, who played as a wing half or inside forward. He made 71 appearances for Small Heath in the Football League, and went on to play for Kettering of the Southern League.

In a 1901 profile of the Small Heath club and players in the Daily Express, C.B. Fry wrote that "Adey is not showy, but he is a fine tackler, and remarkably persistent", and that he and his half-back colleagues Alex Leake and Walter Wigmore "get through an amount of work that is simply astonishing".
