= Jack Aston =

English footballer (1877–1935)

John James Aston
Personal information
- Full name: James Aston
- Date of birth: 1 July 1877
- Place of birth: Walsall, England
- Date of death: 8 November 1935 (aged 58)
- Place of death: West Bromwich, England
- Position: Inside forward

Youth career
- Walsall White Star
- Fullbrook Saints
- Willenhall Pickwick
- Bloxwich Strollers
- Wednesfield

Senior career*
Years	Team	Apps	(Gls)
1896–1899	Walsall	88	(38)
1899–1900	Woolwich Arsenal	11	(3)
1900–1902	Small Heath	55	(24)
1902–1903	Doncaster Rovers	30	(3)
1903–1904	Walsall		
1904–1905	Bilston United		
1905	South Kirkby		
1905–1906	Walsall		
1906–19??	Blakenhall St Luke's		
- Walsall Wood
- * Club domestic league appearances and goals

James Aston (1 July 1877 – 8 November 1935) was an English professional footballer who played as an inside forward. He made 184 appearances and scored 68 goals in the Football League. He was known by the nickname of "Soldier Aston" during his playing career.

== Career ==
He started his league career playing for Walsall, and was the club's leading goalscorer in the 1898–99 season. He was signed by Woolwich Arsenal in May 1899, making his debut on 2 September 1899 against Leicester Fosse. After playing 11 of the first 12 league games of the season and in four FA Cup ties, he lost his place to Paddy Logan in December 1899 and was unable to regain a first-team place. According to a report in the Walsall Advertiser in January 1900 Arsenal were forced into the sale of Aston, one of their "most expensive players", due to a lack of funds. In total he played 15 times for Arsenal, scoring five goals.

He moved on to Small Heath in January 1900 and contributed to their promotion as Second Division runners-up in the 1900–01 season. In April 1901 Tottenham Hotspur reportedly made a move to sign Aston but he was retained by Small Heath for the following season. He went on to play for Doncaster Rovers, briefly rejoined Walsall, before signing professional terms with South Kirkby among a number of clubs prior returning to his old club Walsall once again. In November 1905 it was clear that Aston was not the force he once was, with newspaper reports pointing out that he had "long passed his best" whilst playing for Walsall.

== Personal life ==
It appears that throughout his football career and beyond Aston had a long line of money troubles, resulting in multiple convictions. In March 1902 Aston was ordered by the court to pay towards the support of his mother. In April 1904, Aston's wife, Elizabeth, was awarded a maintenance order to help support their child after she left him because of his drunkenness and "persistent cruelty". In July, now living at 155 Whitehall Road, Walsall, he was sentenced to four weeks' hard labour for non-payment of maintenance to his wife, Elizabeth, and sentenced to a month in prison; he claimed that he had had no work. After a warrant was issued when he failed to attend court in March 1906, Aston was again convicted of non-payment of maintenance and sentenced to a further four weeks' imprisonment. He stated that he had not earned wages as he had not played football since Christmas; his wife stated that "he never paid her anything unless a warrant was out against him."

A year later, Aston again found himself in court for non-payment; the unemployed labourer, living at 21 Proffitt Street, Walsall, was sentenced to a month's hard labour. By December 1907, the arrears had risen from £2 12s in July 1904 to £7 16s and the sentence rose to two months in prison. By April 1908 Aston was living at James Street, Ryecroft, Walsall, and found himself caught up in a midnight trespass into a fowl shed on Rushall Hall Farm. For his part in the caper Aston was sentenced to two months' hard labour, but his sentence was reduced to one month on appeal on the grounds that he had no previous convictions for theft. In November 1909 he was again sentenced to hard labour, this time for two months, for non-payment of maintenance. By now living at 22 Market Square, Stoke, Aston was reportedly well known to the courts for his drunken behaviour.
