= Bob McRoberts (footballer) =

Scottish footballer and manager

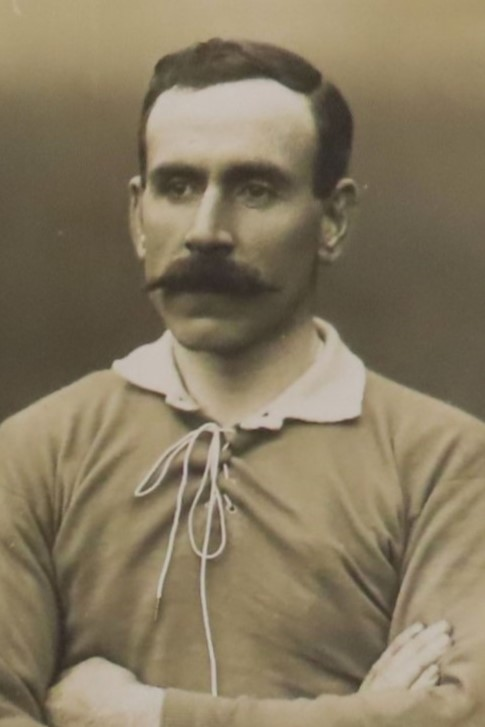

Personal information
- Full name: Robert McRoberts
- Date of birth: 29 June 1874
- Place of birth: Bothwell, Scotland
- Date of death: 27 February 1959 (aged 84)
- Place of death: Birkenhead, England
- Position: Centre-forward

Senior career*
Years	Team	Apps	(Gls)
- Coatbridge
1894–1895	Airdrieonians	7	(7)
1895–1896	Albion Rovers		
1896–1898	Gainsborough Trinity	52	(15)
1898–1905	Small Heath	173	(70)
1905–1911	Chelsea	104	(10)

Managerial career
- 1911–1915: Birmingham
- * Club domestic league appearances and goals

Robert McRoberts (29 June 1874 – 27 February 1959) was a Scottish professional association football player and manager. He played as a centre forward.

== Career ==
McRoberts was born in Bothwell, Scotland. He started his football career at Airdrieonians and Albion Rovers in the Scottish League, and went on to play for Gainsborough Trinity, Small Heath (Birmingham) and Chelsea, where he also played as a defender, in the Football League. He was Small Heath's leading goalscorer for three successive seasons, from 1899–1900 to 1901–02.

McRoberts was Chelsea's first ever £100 signing, joining the newly-formed Second Division side on 26 April 1905. Playing in their first League game in September 1905, McRoberts was a virtual ever-present in his first season with Chelsea, playing 35 games and scoring 9 goals as the team narrowly missed out on promotion to the First Division after a dramatic late-season collapse.

On 4 November 1905, as Chelsea beat Barnsley 6–0 in a home league match, McRoberts scored the club's first-ever penalty.

After retirement, he came back to Birmingham where in June 1911 he was appointed their first full-time professional team manager. Previously the team had been selected by a committee. He managed the club for four years.

McRoberts died in Birkenhead, England, at the age of 84 in 1959. He was cremated at the Landican Cemetery and Crematorium in nearby Woodchurch.

== Sources ==
- Joyce, Michael (2004). Football League Players' Records 1888 to 1939. Nottingham: SoccerData. ISBN 978-1-899468-67-6.
- Matthews, Tony (1995). Birmingham City: A Complete Record. Derby: Breedon Books. ISBN 1-85983-010-2.
