= Billy Pratt (footballer, born 1874) =

English footballer

Personal information
- Full name: William Pratt
- Date of birth: 1874
- Place of birth: Birmingham, England
- Date of death: Unknown
- Position: Left back

Senior career*
Years	Team	Apps	(Gls)
- Hoskins & Sewell
1894–1902	Small Heath	126	(0)
- * Club domestic league appearances and goals

William Pratt (1874 – after 1902) was an English professional footballer who played for Small Heath as a left back. Born in Birmingham, he was a powerful defender whose career was ended prematurely through injury. He made 139 appearances in all competitions for Small Heath without scoring a goal.

== Honours ==
- Football League Second Division runners-up: 1900–01
