= Arthur Archer (footballer) =

English footballer

Personal information
- Date of birth: 1874
- Place of birth: Derby, England
- Date of death: 1940 (aged 65–66)
- Position: Full back

Youth career
- 1892–1893: Burton St Edmund's
- 1893–1895: Tutbury Hampton

Senior career*
Years	Team	Apps	(Gls)
1895	Swadlincote Town		
1895–1897	Burton Wanderers	42	(1)
1897–1902	Small Heath	154	(4)
1902–1903	Wingfield House		
1903	New Brompton		
1903-1905	Queens Park Rangers	52	(0)
1903–1905	Tottenham Hotspur		
1905–1907	Norwich City		
1907–1908	Brighton & Hove Albion	28	(0)
1908–1909	Millwall Athletic		
- * Club domestic league appearances and goals

Arthur Archer (1874–1940) was an English professional association footballer who played as a full back. Born in Derby, Archer made 170 appearances in all competitions for Small Heath in a five-year career, including over 150 games in the Football League, as well as playing for a variety of other clubs. When he finished playing he coached in Germany, Italy and Belgium, as well as a brief spell in England with Watford.

== Honours ==
Small Heath

- Second Division runners up: 1900–01
