= Sid Wharton =

English footballer

Personal information
- Full name: Sidney Emmanuel Wharton
- Date of birth: 19 December 1875
- Place of birth: Birmingham, England
- Date of death: 5 January 1951 (aged 75)
- Place of death: Birmingham, England
- Position: Winger

Youth career
- Smethwick Wesleyan Rovers

Senior career*
Years	Team	Apps	(Gls)
1897–1903	Small Heath	151	(20)
- * Club domestic league appearances and goals

Sidney Emmanuel Wharton (19 December 1875 – 5 January 1951) was an English professional footballer who played for Small Heath as a winger. He was a pacy winger with good ball-control who created chances and was always involved in the game. He made 167 appearances in all competitions for Small Heath. In 1900–01 he played for the Football League XI against the Irish League and was a member of an England XI in an unofficial international against a German XI, alongside clubmate Alex Leake.

In the 1901 Census, Wharton was listed as a professional footballer living in Dawson Street, Smethwick, Staffordshire. He later became a bookmaker, and is listed in that occupation on the 1939 Register. He died in Birmingham in January 1951 at the age of 75.

He was the uncle of racing car driver Ken Wharton.

== Honours ==
Small Heath

- Football League Second Division runners up: 1900–01, 1902–03
