= 1913–14 Birmingham F.C. season =

Birmingham F.C.
1913–14 season
- Chairman: Howard Cant
- Manager: Bob McRoberts
- Ground: St Andrew's
- Football League Second Division: 14th
- FA Cup: Third round (eliminated by Queens Park Rangers)
- Top goalscorer: League: Andy Smith (10); All: Andy Smith (10)
- Highest home attendance: 25,000 (four matches)
- Lowest home attendance: 7,000 vs Huddersfield Town, 28 September 1913 Blackpool (14 March 1914)
- Average home league attendance: 17,095
Team colours

The 1913–14 Football League season was Birmingham Football Club's 22nd in the Football League and their 14th in the Second Division. They finished in 14th position in the 20-team division. They also took part in the 1913–14 FA Cup, entering at the first round proper and losing to Southern League club Queens Park Rangers in the third round (last 16).

No fewer than thirty-five players made at least one appearance in nationally organised first-team competition, and there were twenty different goalscorers. Full-back Frank Womack played in 39 of the 41 matches over the season; only three other players exceeded 20 appearances. Andy Smith was leading scorer with 10 goals, all of which came in the league.

In November 1913, Birmingham captain Womack was offered an inducement of £55 to fix the result of the match against Grimsby Town. A similar offer was made to West Bromwich Albion captain Jesse Pennington in relation to their match against Everton. Both men reported the matter to club officials and the police, an arrest was made, and the culprit, one Pascoe Bioletti, who was connected with a football betting service based in Switzerland, was convicted and sentenced to five months' imprisonment in relation to Pennington. After his release, the charge in relation to Womack was withdrawn, as "the Football Association did not want to be vindictive as Bioletti was 68 years old."

== Football League Second Division ==
Date	League position	Opponents	Venue	Result	Score F–A	Scorers	Attendance
3 September 1913	4th	Stockport County	H	W	3–2	Reed 2, Hastings	13,000
6 September 1913	8th	Bradford Park Avenue	H	L	1–2	Billy Jones	20,000
13 September 1913	13th	Notts County	A	L	1–5	Andy Smith	12,000
20 September 1913	13th	Leicester Fosse	H	W	1–0	Ballantyne	20,000
27 September 1913	13th	Wolverhampton Wanderers	A	L	0–1		20,000
4 October 1913	13th	Hull City	H	D	1–1	Hastings	9,000
11 October 1913	13th	Barnsley	A	D	1–1	Gibson	9,000
18 October 1913	13th	Bury	H	W	1–0	Neilson	15,000
25 October 1913	15th	Huddersfield Town	A	L	0–7		10,000
1 November 1913	14th	Lincoln City	H	W	2–0	Andy Smith, Hodges	18,000
8 November 1913	13th	Blackpool	A	D	2–2	Andy Smith, Walker	4,000
15 November 1913	12th	Nottingham Forest	H	W	2–0	Bumphrey, Walker	15,000
22 November 1913	13th	Woolwich Arsenal	A	L	0–1		30,000
29 November 1913	14th	Grimsby Town	H	L	1–2	Walker	12,000
6 December 1913	15th	Fulham	A	L	0–1		10,000
13 December 1913	14th	Bristol City	A	W	2–1	Gibson, Walker	15,000
20 December 1913	15th	Leeds City	H	L	0–2		15,000
25 December 1913	13th	Glossop	H	W	6–0	Walker 2, Foster, Hall 2, Bumphrey	25,000
26 December 1913	14th	Glossop	A	L	1–4	Walker	2,000
27 December 1913	15th	Bradford Park Avenue	A	L	1–5	Morgan	6,000
1 January 1914	16th	Stockport County	A	L	0–2		8,000
3 January 1914	15th	Notts County	H	W	2–1	Morgan, Pointon	10,000
17 January 1914	13th	Leicester Fosse	A	D	0–0		6,000
24 January 1914	12th	Wolverhampton Wanderers	H	W	4–1	Reed, Duncan, Ballantyne, Morgan	30,000
7 February 1914	12th	Hull City	A	D	0–0		9,000
14 February 1914	13th	Barnsley	H	D	0–0		18,000
24 February 1914	14th	Bury	A	L	1–3	Gibson	4,116
28 February 1914	15th	Huddersfield Town	H	L	1–4	Arthur Smith	15,000
7 March 1914	15th	Lincoln City	A	D	1–1	Morgan	8,000
14 March 1914	15th	Blackpool	H	D	0–0		7,000
21 March 1914	15th	Nottingham Forest	A	L	1–3	Hall	5,000
28 March 1914	14th	Woolwich Arsenal	H	W	2–0	Andy Smith 2	17,810
4 April 1914	14th	Grimsby Town	A	W	2–0	Andy Smith 2	8,000
10 April 1914	13th	Clapton Orient	H	W	2–0	Hall, Andy Smith	30,000
11 April 1914	13th	Fulham	H	L	0–1		20,000
13 April 1914	13th	Clapton Orient	A	D	2–2	Walker, Hall	12,000
18 April 1914	13th	Bristol City	H	D	2–2	Wally Smith, Andy Smith	15,000
25 April 1914	14th	Leeds City	A	L	2–3	Andy Smith, Gardner	10,000

=== League table (part) ===
Final Second Division table (part)
Pos	Club	Pld	W	D	L	F	A	GA	Pts
12th	Stockport County	38	13	10	15	77	52	0.96	36
13th	Huddersfield Town	38	13	8	17	47	53	0.89	34
14th	Birmingham	38	12	10	16	48	60	0.80	34
15th	Grimsby Town	38	13	8	17	42	58	0.72	34
16th	Blackpool	38	9	14	15	33	44	0.75	32
Key	Pos = League position; Pld = Matches played; W = Matches won; D = Matches drawn; L = Matches lost; F = Goals for; A = Goals against; GA = Goal average; Pts = Points								
Source									

== FA Cup ==
Round	Date	Opponents	Venue	Result	Score F–A	Scorers	Attendance
First round	10 January 1914	Southend United	H	W	2–1	Duncan 2	18,000
Second round	31 January 1914	Huddersfield Town	H	W	1–0	Morgan	45,000
Third round	23 February 1914	Queens Park Rangers	H	L	1–2	Duncan	35,000

== Appearances and goals ==
This table includes appearances and goals in nationally organised competitive matches – the Football League and FA Cup – only.
For a description of the playing positions, see Formation (association football)#2–3–5 (Pyramid).
Players marked † left the club during the playing season.

Players' appearances and goals by competition
Name	Position	League		FA Cup		Total	
Name	Position	Apps	Goals	Apps	Goals	Apps	Goals
Bert Crossthwaite	Goalkeeper	17	0	0	0	17	0
Bob Evans	Goalkeeper	3	0	0	0	3	0
Stan Hauser	Goalkeeper	16	0	3	0	19	0
William Robb	Goalkeeper	2	0	0	0	2	0
William Ball	Full back	30	0	3	0	33	0
Bob Fairman	Full back	6	0	0	0	6	0
Arthur Stanton	Full back	4	0	0	0	4	0
Frank Womack	Full back	36	0	3	0	39	0
Percy Barton	Half back	16	0	3	0	19	3
James Bumphrey	Half back	23	2	3	0	26	2
Ernie Edwards	Half back	15	0	0	0	15	0
Albert Gardner	Half back	7	1	0	0	7	1
Alec McClure	Half back	16	0	2	0	18	0
Joe Roulson	Half back	12	0	0	0	12	0
Joseph Smith	Half back	4	0	0	0	4	0
Alf Tinkler	Half back	22	0	1	0	23	1
John Ballantyne	Forward	19	2	1	0	20	2
Charlie Duncan	Forward	12	1	2	3	14	4
Edmund Eyre	Forward	6	0	0	0	6	0
Arthur Foster †	Forward	2	1	0	0	2	1
Richard Gibson	Forward	18	3	2	0	20	3
Jack Hall	Forward	17	5	1	0	18	5
Bill Hastings	Forward	11	2	3	0	14	2
Frank Hodges	Forward	10	1	0	0	10	1
Billy Jones †	Forward	9	1	0	0	9	1
Billy Morgan	Forward	14	4	3	1	17	5
Peter Neilson †	Forward	3	1	0	0	3	1
Tom Pointon †	Forward	4	1	0	0	4	1
Arthur Reed	Forward	8	3	1	0	9	3
George Robertson	Forward	5	0	0	0	5	0
Andy Smith	Forward	18	10	0	0	18	10
Arthur Smith	Forward	14	1	0	0	14	1
Wally Smith	Forward	5	1	0	0	5	1
Billy Walker	Forward	12	8	2	0	14	8
Jimmy Windridge	Forward	3	0	0	0	3	0

== See also ==
- Birmingham City F.C. seasons
