= List of Birmingham City F.C. players (25–99 appearances) =

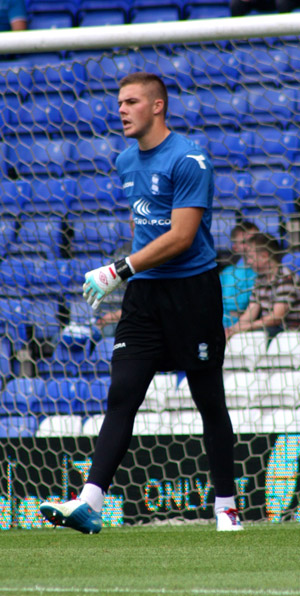
In August 2012, Jack Butland became the youngest goalkeeper to represent England at senior level.

Birmingham City Football Club, an English association football club based in the city of Birmingham, was founded in 1875 under the name of Small Heath Alliance. They first entered the FA Cup in the 1881–82 season. When nationally organised league football began in 1888, the club, by then called simply Small Heath F.C., were not invited to join the Football League. Instead, they became a founder member of the Football Alliance, which was formed a year later. In 1892, the Football League decided to expand, and invited the Alliance clubs to join; as one of the less successful members of the Alliance, Small Heath were placed in the newly formed Second Division. The club's first team have competed in numerous nationally and internationally organised competitions, and all players who have played between 25 and 99 such matches, either as a member of the starting eleven or as a substitute, are listed below.

Each player's details include the duration of his Birmingham career, his typical playing position while with the club, and the number of games played and goals scored in domestic league matches and in all senior competitive matches. Where applicable, the list also includes the national team for which the player was selected, and the number of senior international caps he won.

== Introduction ==
As of the date specified below, more than 300 men had completed their Birmingham career after playing in at least 25 and fewer than 100 senior competitive matches. Several of these took an important role with the club after they retired as players. Harry Morris, who joined the club's board of directors in 1903, was instrumental in planning the St Andrew's stadium, which has been the club's home ground since 1906. In his role as Birmingham's chief scout in the 1960s, Don Dorman was responsible for recruiting youngsters including Trevor Francis – the first player transferred between British clubs for a £1 million fee – and future internationals Bob Latchford and Kenny Burns. Bill Harvey, Arthur Turner, Steve Bruce and Lee Bowyer went on to manage the club. Turner led the team to their highest league finish and to the FA Cup Final in 1956, while Birmingham gained promotion to the Premier League twice under Bruce's managership.

Walter Abbott set two goalscoring records in the 1898–99 season which, as of the date below, still stand: he scored 42 goals in all competitions, and 34 league goals in as many games in the Football League. Chris Charsley, a serving police officer who played as an amateur, was the first man capped by England while with the club; in later life, he became chief constable of the Coventry police force.

Other players took part in significant matches in the history of the club. Harry Morris and Eddy Stanley appeared in every match as Small Heath Alliance progressed through six rounds to the semi-final of the 1885–86 FA Cup. Tom Bayley, George Short and Fred Speller appeared in Small Heath's first Football League match in 1892. In more recent times, John Gayle scored the winning goal as Birmingham beat Tranmere Rovers in the 1991 Associate Members' Cup final. The 18-year-old Darren Carter converted the decisive penalty in the 2002 play-off final shootout by which Birmingham were promoted to the Premier League for the first time; goalkeeper Nico Vaesen saved one of the opponents' spot-kicks. The Birmingham team that won the 2011 League Cup featured five men listed here, including Ben Foster, who won the man of the match award. Teenagers Nathan Redmond and Chris Wood scored two of the three goals that took Birmingham through to the group stage of the Europa League in the club's first season in European competition for 50 years.

Two players – George Edwards in 1948 and Steve Wigley in 1989 – left the club with 99 career appearances.

== Key ==
- The list is ordered first by number of appearances in total, then by number of League appearances, and then if necessary by date of debut.
- Appearances as a substitute are included.
- Statistics are correct up and including the match played on 3 May 2025, the last match of the 2024–25 regular season. Where a player left the club permanently after this date, his statistics are updated to his date of leaving.

Player
Players marked * were registered for the club as at the date specified above.
Players with name in italics and marked † were on loan from another club for the duration of their Birmingham career. The loaning club is noted in the Notes column.
Players marked ‡ have been inducted into the Birmingham City F.C. Hall of Fame.
Players marked $ have won the Birmingham City F.C. Player of the Year award.

Positions key
Pre-1960s		1960s–	
GK	Goalkeeper		
FB	Full back	DF	Defender
HB	Half back	MF	Midfielder
FW	Forward		
U	Utility player		

Position
Playing positions are listed according to the tactical formations that were employed at the time. Thus the change in the names of defensive and midfield positions reflects the tactical evolution that occurred from the 1960s onwards. (Note: Playing position sourced to Matthews (2010), pp. 120–199 until the 2009–10 season, and thereafter to "Birmingham City". Soccerbase. Centurycomm. Archived from the original on 26 May 2007.)
Club career
Club career is defined as the first and last calendar years in which the player appeared for the club in any of the competitions listed below.
League appearances and League goals
League appearances and goals comprise those in the Football Alliance, the Football League and the Premier League. Appearances in the 1939–40 Football League season, abandoned after three games because of the Second World War, are excluded.
Total appearances and Total goals
Total appearances and goals comprise those in the Football Alliance, Football League (including test matches and play-offs), Premier League, FA Cup, League Cup, UEFA Europa League, Associate Members' Cup/Football League Trophy, Inter-Cities Fairs Cup, Anglo-Italian Cup, Texaco Cup, Anglo-Scottish Cup and Full Members' Cup. Matches in wartime competitions are excluded.
International selection
Countries are listed only for players who have been selected for international football. Only the highest level of international competition is given, except where a player competed for more than one country, in which case the highest level reached for each country is shown.
Between 1926 and 1950, two competing football teams claimed to represent the island of Ireland. Some players, including Birmingham's Jackie Brown, appeared for both teams. For more information, see Ireland national football team (1882–1950) and Republic of Ireland national football team.
- Ireland denotes players who played for the Irish Football Association team;
- Republic of Ireland denotes players who played for the Football Association of Ireland team.
Caps
For players having played at full international level, the caps column counts the number of such appearances during his career with the club.

== Players with 25 to 99 appearances ==
Despite his goalscoring record at Small Heath, Walter Abbott played nearly 300 times for Everton as a wing half.

The editor of Arsenal F.C.'s 1914–15 Handbook "firmly believe[d] that with a man like [Harry] King in the vanguard last season [they] would now be in Division I".

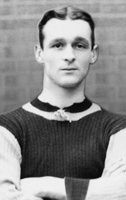
Harry Hampton was Birmingham's top scorer in the 1920–21 Football League Second Division-winning season.

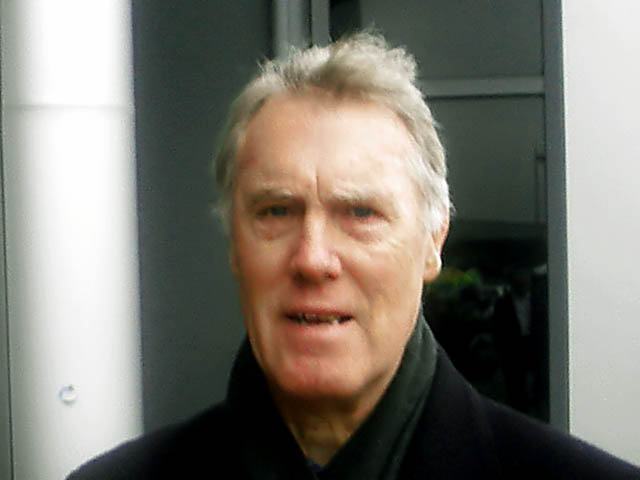
Johnny Newman was in the Birmingham team that became the first English club side to take part in European competition in 1956.

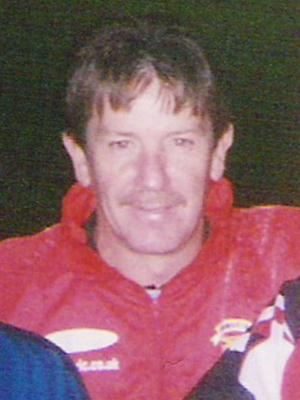
Paul Hendrie began his career with Birmingham in the 1970s before playing more than 300 games in the Football League for other clubs.

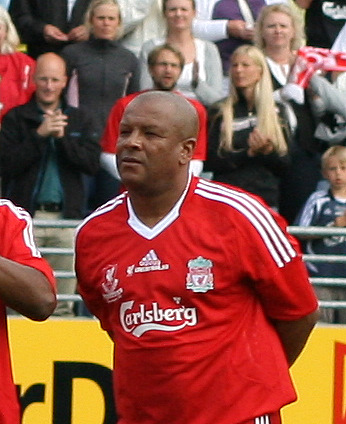
Howard Gayle, who was Liverpool F.C.'s first black player, spent 18 months with Birmingham in the 1980s.

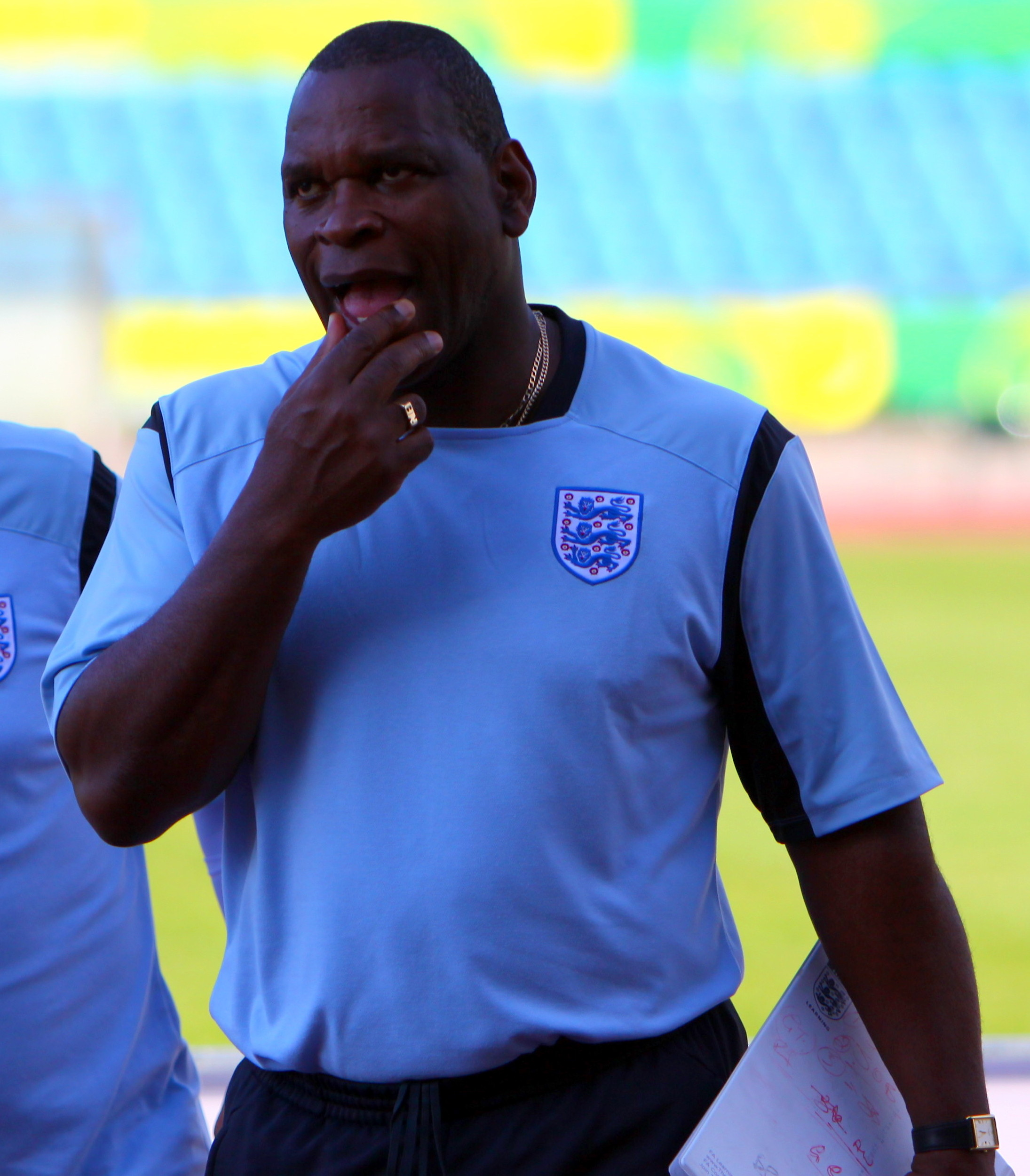
After more than 700 senior appearances, including 96 for Birmingham, Noel Blake went on to spend five years as manager of the England under-19 team.

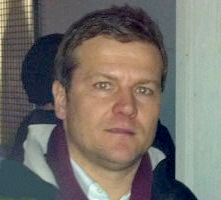
Mark Cooper spent a season with Birmingham under the management of his father, Terry.

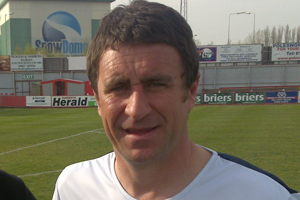
Liam Daish captained Birmingham to the Division Two title in 1994–95 and to victory in the 1995 Football League Trophy final.

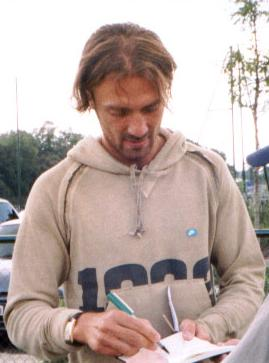
French World Cup-winner Christophe Dugarry is the only man with fewer than 100 club appearances to be inducted into the Birmingham City Hall of Fame.

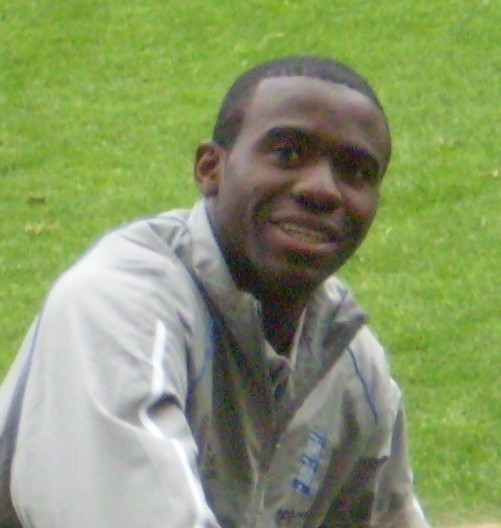
Fabrice Muamba, whose career was ended by a cardiac arrest suffered during a match in 2012, won Birmingham's Young Player of the Season award for 2006–07.

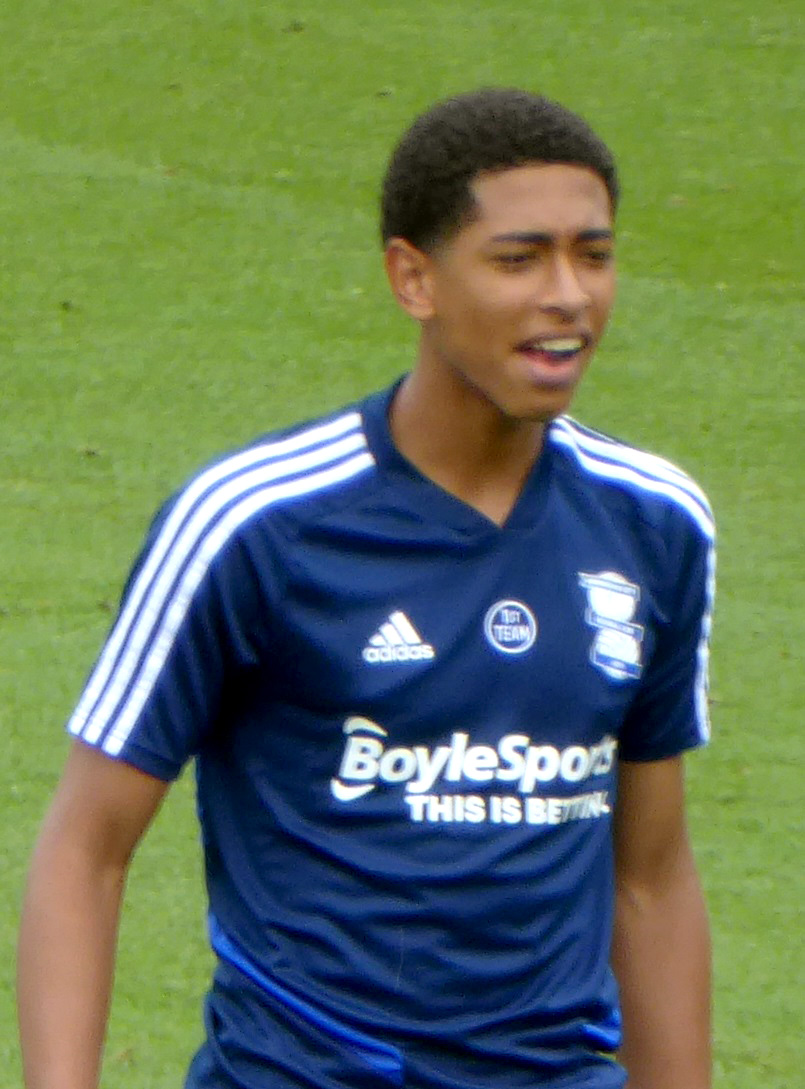
Jude Bellingham, Birmingham's youngest ever first-team player

Table of players, including playing position, club statistics and international selection
Player	Pos	Club career	League (Note: Appearances and goals for players whose Birmingham careers ended before the 2010–11 season are sourced to Matthews (2010), pp. 234–455, 466–483; because of proofreading errors, appearances in the 1992–93 Anglo-Italian Cup are sourced to Matthews (1995), p. 244. Later players are sourced individually.)		Total		International selection (Note: Unless sourced individually, international selection and caps are sourced to Matthews (2010), pp. 498–503 or via the alphabetical list at worldfootball.net. Number of senior caps excludes any won while out on loan from Birmingham.)	Caps	Notes	Refs
Player	Pos	Club career	Apps	Goals	Apps	Goals	International selection	Caps	Notes	Refs
Steve Wigley	MF	1987–1989	87	4	99	5	—	—		
George Edwards	FW	1946–1948	84	9	99	9	Wales	6		
Jack Firth	HB	1927–1932	93	7	98	8	—	—		
Liam Daish	DF	1994–1996	73	3	98	6	Republic of Ireland	0		
Arthur Mounteney	FW	1905–1909	91	29	97	30	—	—		
Clinton Morrison	FW	2002–2005	87	14	97	16	Republic of Ireland	24		
Dion Sanderson *	DF	2021–2022; 2022–present	85	3	97	3	—	—	(Note: Wolverhampton Wanderers)	
Jamie Clapham	DF	2003–2006	84	1	97	1	—	—		
Gary McSheffrey	FW	2006–2010	83	16	96	20	England U20	—		
Steve Robinson	MF	1995–2000	81	0	96	2	—	—		
Noel Blake	DF	1982–1984	76	5	96	5	—	—		
Denis Thwaites	FW	1961–1971	86	18	95	21	England youth	—		
Olivier Tébily	DF	2002–2006	83	0	95	0	Ivory Coast	4		
Wally Harris	FW	1924–1927	89	12	94	13	England trial	—		
Thomas Daykin	HB	1908–1912	88	1	94	1	—	—		
Lee Bowyer	MF	2009–2011	81	10	94	12	England	0	(Note: Player who later managed the club.) (Note: West Ham United)	
Kevin Francis	FW	1995–1998	73	13	94	21	Saint Kitts and Nevis	0		
Radhi Jaïdi	DF	2006–2009	86	6	93	6	Tunisia	17		
Fred Speller	FB	1888–1893	75	0	93	0	—	—		
Dennis Bailey	FW	1989–1991	75	23	93	25	—	—		
Willie Steel	FB	1935–1938	91	0	92	0	—	—		
Darren Randolph	GK	2013–2015	91	0	92	0	Republic of Ireland	0		
Tomasz Kuszczak	GK	2015–2017	89	0	92	0	Poland	0		
Bunny Larkin	U	1956–1960	79	23	92	29	—	—		
Marcelo	FW	1999–2002	77	24	92	26	—	—		
Charlie Tickle	FW	1902–1908	88	14	91	14	—	—		
Jay Stansfield *	FW	2023–2024; 2024–present	82	33	94	39	England U21	—	(Note: Fulham)	
Byron Stevenson	DF	1982–1985	74	3	91	3	Wales	4		
Steven Caldwell	DF	2011–2013	77	1	90	2	Scotland	0		
Nicky Eaden	DF	2000–2002	74	3	90	5	—	—		
John Ruddy	GK	2022–2024	87	0	89	0	England	0		
Oakey Field	FW	1902–1905	86	14	89	15	—	—		
Ernie Islip	FW	1923–1927	83	23	89	24	—	—		
Chris Whyte	DF	1993–1996	68	1	89	1	England U21	—		
Robbie Savage $	MF	2002–2005	82	11	88	12	Wales	14		
James McFadden	FW	2008–2010	82	13	88	14	Scotland	11		
Stephen Kelly	DF	2006–2009	79	0	88	0	Republic of Ireland	12		
Kevin Langley	MF	1988–1990	76	2	88	2	—	—		
Roger Johnson	DF	2009–2011	76	2	88	3	—	—		
Frank Worthington	FW	1979–1982	75	29	88	33	England	0		
Fred Pickering	FW	1967–1969	74	27	88	32	England	0		
Chris Holland	MF	1996–2000	70	0	88	0	England U21	—	(Note: Newcastle United)	
George Robertson	U	1910–1913	84	17	87	17	—	—		
Andy Kennedy	FW	1985–1988	76	18	87	20	Scotland youth	—		
Charlie Millington	FW	1909–1912	83	13	86	13	—	—		
Lee Camp	GK	2018–2020	80	0	86	0	Northern Ireland; England U21	0		
Benny Bond	FW	1927–1931	82	13	85	13	—	—		
Alec Jackson	FW	1964–1966	78	11	85	12	—	—		
Walter Abbott	FW	1896–1899; 1910	77	57	85	66	England	0		
Stern John	FW	2002–2004	77	16	85	21	Trinidad and Tobago	14		
Seymour Morris	FW	1935–1939	83	29	84	30	Wales	5		
Mehdi Nafti	MF	2005–2009	80	0	84	1	Tunisia	15	(Note: Racing Santander)	
Bill Horsman	FW	1929–1935	79	3	84	3	—	—		
Freddie Wilcox	FW	1903–1906	78	32	84	32	England trial	—		
Billy Guest	FW	1933–1937	76	15	84	17	—	—		
David Seaman	GK	1984–1986	75	0	84	0	England	0		
Jeff Kenna	DF	2001–2004	75	3	84	3	Republic of Ireland	0	(Note: Blackburn Rovers)	
Steve Bruce $	DF	1996–1998	72	2	84	3	England B	—		
Barry Ferguson	MF	2009–2011	72	0	84	2	Scotland	0		
Gary Cooper	MF / DF	1993–1996	62	2	83	4	England youth	—		
Edmund Eyre	FW	1907–1908; 1914–1915	77	14	82	16	—	—		
Archie Styles	DF	1974–1978	74	4	82	4	England youth	—		
Kevin Phillips	FW	2008–2011	69	19	82	22	England	0		
Mark Ward	MF	1994–1995	63	7	82	8	England semi-pro	—		
Nathan Redmond	MF	2010–2013	62	7	82	9	England	0		
George Hicks	FW	1928–1931	76	18	81	18	—	—		
George Anderson	FW	1905–1909	74	10	81	10	—	—		
Jon Bass	DF	1994–2001	68	0	81	0	English Schools	—		
Gary Emmanuel	MF	1975–1978	71	6	80	6	Wales U23	—		
Paul Mardon	DF	1991–1993	64	1	80	1	Wales	0		
Chris Charsley	GK	1886–1894	55	0	80	0	England	1		
Bill Harvey	FW	1921–1926	78	2	79	2	England amateur	—		
Archie Goldie	FB	1901–1904	77	0	79	0	—	—		
George Adey	U	1899–1902	71	1	79	2	—	—		
Fabrice Muamba	MF	2006–2008	71	2	79	2	England U21	—	(Note: Arsenal)	
Neil Etheridge	GK	2020–2024	70	0	79	0	Philippines; England U16	15		
Marlon King	FW	2011–2013	67	29	79	32	Jamaica	2		
John Roberts	DF	1972–1976	66	1	79	1	Wales	15		
Simon Charlton	DF	1997–2000	72	0	78	0	England youth	—	(Note: Southampton)	
Demarai Gray	MF	2013–2016	72	8	78	8	Jamaica; England U21	0		
Emile Heskey $	FW	2004–2006	68	14	78	16	England	3		
Billy Bennett	FW	1896–1901	70	12	76	13	—	—		
Nicky Forster	FW	1997–1999	68	11	76	12	England U21	—		
Tony Evans	FW	1979–1982	66	28	76	33	—	—		
Jerry Gill	DF	1998–2001	60	0	76	0	England semi-pro	—		
Jota	MF	2017–2019	72	8	75	8	—	—		
Laurie Burkinshaw	FW	1919–1921	71	11	75	12	—	—		
Frank Lester	FB	1895–1900	68	0	75	0	—	—		
Bob Gregg	FW	1931–1933	66	11	75	13	—	—		
Roy Martin	FB	1950–1955	69	0	74	0	—	—		
Mike Kelly	GK	1970–1975	62	0	74	0	England amateur	—		
Andrew Shinnie	MF	2013–2016	67	4	73	6	Scotland	0		
Jimmy Montgomery	GK	1977–1979	66	0	73	0	England U23	—		
Tommy Williams	DF	1986–1988	62	1	73	2	—	—		
Martin Hicks $	DF	1991–1993	60	1	73	2	—	—		
Julian Gray	MF	2004–2007	60	3	73	5	—	—		
Ethan Laird *	DF	2023–present	60	4	73	5	England U19	—		
Brian Sharples	DF	1962–1968	61	2	72	2	—	—		(Note: Matthews attributes Sharples' 18 September 1965 appearance against Portsmouth to the injured Winston Foster.)
Keshi Anderson *	MF	2023–present	57	7	72	9	—	—		
Arthur Leonard	FW	1901–1904	68	25	71	26	—	—		
Robin Stubbs	FW	1959–1963	61	17	71	20	—	—		
Eli Ashurst	FB	1922–1926	66	1	70	1	—	—		
Ted Purdon	FW	1951–1954	64	27	70	30	—	—		
Bobby Thomson	DF	1969–1970	63	0	69	0	England	0		
Tom Bayley	FB	1890–1893	60	0	69	0	—	—		
Lee Novak	FW	2013–2016	59	10	69	13	—	—		
Ken Armstrong	DF	1984–1986	58	2	69	2	—	—		
David Dunn	MF	2003–2006	58	7	69	8	England	0		
Harry Morris	HB	1884–1893	41	2	69	4	—	—		
Billy Morgan	FW	1913–1920	60	11	68	13	England Victory International	—		
Billy Wardle	FW	1951–1953	60	5	68	7	—	—		
Paik Seung-ho *	MF	2024–present	59	2	68	2	South Korea	6		
Roger Hansbury	GK	1986–1989	57	0	68	0	—	—		
Brian Taylor	FW	1958–1961	54	7	68	8	—	—		
Joe Lane	FW	1920–1922	67	26	67	26	—	—		
Kevin Ashley	DF	1987–1990	57	1	67	1	—	—		
Mario Melchiot	DF	2004–2006	57	2	67	2	Netherlands	2		
Kevin Poole	GK	1998–2001	56	0	67	0	—	—		
Dai Richards	HB	1937–1939	62	2	66	2	Wales	6		
Frank Clack	GK	1934–1939	60	0	66	0	—	—		
Callum Reilly	MF	2012–2015	60	2	66	2	Republic of Ireland U21	—		
Henry Clutterbuck	GK	1897–1899	59	0	66	0	—	—		
Steve Lynex	MF	1979–1981; 1986	56	12	66	13	—	—	(Note: Leicester City)	
Mark Yates	U	1988–1991	54	6	66	7	England semi-pro	—		
Norman Brunskill	HB	1936–1938	63	2	65	2	—	—		
Johnny Newman	HB	1952–1957	60	0	65	0	—	—		
Don Givens	FW	1978–1981	59	10	65	10	Republic of Ireland	13		
Andy Saville	FW	1993–1995	59	17	65	18	—	—		
Jason Bowen	MF	1995–1997	48	7	65	11	Wales	1		
John Kearns	FB	1906–1909	61	1	64	1	—	—		
Don Dorman	FW	1947–1951	59	4	64	6	—	—		
John Connolly	FW	1976–1978	57	9	63	9	Scotland	0		
Jimmy Inglis	FW	1896–1899	56	24	63	30	—	—		
Nico Vaesen	GK	2001–2005	54	0	63	0	—	—		
Thomas Dunlop	FB / HB	1896–1898	59	2	62	2	—	—		
John Oliver	FB	1894–1896	57	0	62	0	—	—		
Bill Smith	FW	1950–1952	55	21	62	23	—	—		
Gary Childs	MF	1987–1989	55	2	62	2	England U18	—		
Ricky Otto	FW	1994–1996	46	6	62	8	—	—		
Colin Doyle	GK	2006–2015	31	0	62	0	Republic of Ireland	1		
Tahith Chong	MF	2021–2022; 2022–2023	58	5	61	5	Netherlands U21	—	(Note: Manchester United)	
Jack Aston	FW	1900–1902	55	24	61	24	—	—	(Note: Reliable sources differ widely on the scorers in Small Heath's 10–1 win at home to Blackpool on 2 March 1901. This article uses the English National Football Archive (ENFA) version – McRoberts, Aston 2, Archer, McMillan 5, and Wharton – as likely the result of more recent research.)	
Jimmy Windridge	FW	1903–1905; 1914–1915	55	18	61	19	England	0		
Frank Cornan	HB	1905–1908	54	1	61	1	—	—		
Garry O'Connor	FW	2007–2010	52	9	61	12	Scotland	5		
Mat Sadler	DF	2002–2007	51	0	61	0	England U19	—		
Stuart Parnaby	DF	2007–2011	47	0	61	1	England U21	—		
Harold Wassell	FB	1902–1903	56	0	60	1	—	—		
Jermaine Pennant	MF	2005–2006	50	2	60	3	England U21	—		
Scott Dann	DF	2009–2011	50	2	60	3	England U21	—		
Dave Barnett	DF	1993–1997	46	0	60	0	—	—		
Harry Hampton	FW	1920–1922	57	31	59	31	England	0		
Andy Smith	FW	1912–1915	54	33	59	36	—	—		
Chris Marsden	MF	1997–1998	52	3	59	6	—	—		
Wes Harding	DF	2017–2020	51	0	59	0	Jamaica	0		(Note: Some database sources, including worldfootball.net, credit Harding with Omar Bogle's substitute appearance against Brentford on 2 October 2018.)
Scott Hiley	DF	1993–1996	49	0	59	0	—	—		
Howard Gayle	FW	1983–1984	46	9	59	11	England U21	—		
Andy Edwards	DF	1995–1996	40	1	59	3	—	—		
Graham Hyde	MF	1999–2002	52	1	58	2	—	—		
Paul Peschisolido	FW	1992–1994; 1996	52	17	57	18	Canada	9		
Alfie May *	FW	2024–present	44	16	57	17	—	—		
Frank Buckley	HB	1909–1911	55	4	56	4	England	0		
Joe Devine	U	1935–1937	55	2	56	2	—	—		
Troy Deeney	FW	2021–2023	54	11	56	11	—	—		
Ryan Shotton	DF	2016–2017	53	3	56	3	—	—	(Note: Derby County)	
Jon Toral $	MF	2015–2016; 2020–2021	52	10	56	10	—	—		
Jim Higgins	FW	1949–1952	50	12	56	14	Republic of Ireland	1		
David Geddis	FW	1984–1986	46	18	56	21	England B	—		
Danny Sonner	MF	2000–2001	41	2	56	3	Northern Ireland	1		
Jean Beausejour	MF	2010–2012	39	3	56	5	Chile	13		
Curtis Woodhouse	MF	2001–2002	48	2	55	2	England U21	—		
John Gayle	FW	1990–1993	44	10	55	14	—	—		
Jordan Graham	MF	2021–2023	49	0	54	0	England U17; Republic of Ireland U15	—		
Richard Dryden	DF	1993–1994	48	0	54	0	—	—		
Les Phillips	MF	1982–1984	44	3	54	4	England youth	—		
Christoph Klarer *	DF	2024–present	43	1	54	2	Austria U21	—		
Alex Cochrane *	DF	2024–present	42	1	54	1	England U20	—		
Horace Bailey	GK	1911–1913	50	0	53	0	England	0		
Lee Carsley	MF	2008–2010	48	2	53	3	Republic of Ireland	0		
Thomas Farnall	HB	1896–1897; 1899–1900	45	2	53	2	—	—		
Darren Carter	MF	2002–2005	45	3	53	5	England U20	—		
Will Devey	FW	1888–1891; 1899	42	34	53	50	—	—		
Arthur Turner	HB	1939–1947	39	0	53	0	—	—	(Note: Player statistics exclude three matches played in the aborted 1939–40 Football League season.)	
Arthur Smith	FW	1912–1914	51	3	52	3	—	—		
Aubrey Scriven	FW	1924–1927	51	9	52	9	—	—		
Frederick Chapple	FW	1908–1910	50	15	52	16	—	—		
Tommy Briggs	FW	1951–1952	50	22	52	23	England B	—		
Johnny McMillan	FW	1901–1903	49	24	52	25	—	—		
George Friend	DF	2020–2023	46	0	52	0	—	—		
Kōji Miyoshi	MF	2023–2024	46	6	52	7	Japan	0		
Andy Legg	MF	1996–1997	45	5	52	5	Wales	4		
Stan Harland	MF	1971–1972	38	0	52	0	—	—		
Ambrose Hartwell	FB / HB	1902–1907	50	1	51	1	—	—		
Harry Howard	HB	1902–1906	48	1	51	1	—	—		
Franck Queudrue $	DF	2007–2010	47	3	51	3	France B	—		
Joe Smith	FB	1926–1928	48	0	50	0	England	0		
Jonathan Leko	MF	2020–2023	46	0	50	1	England U20	—		
Wes Thomas	FW	2013; 2014–2016	44	7	50	11	—	—	(Note: AFC Bournemouth)	
DJ Campbell	FW	2006–2007	43	9	50	12	England C	—		
Bert Crossthwaite	GK	1911–1914	49	0	49	0	—	—		
George Hollis	GK	1891–1894	48	0	49	0	—	—		
Jackie Lane	FW	1953–1956	46	14	49	14	—	—		
Jack Wilcox	FW	1908–1911	47	1	48	1	—	—		
Walter Corbett	FB	1907–1911	46	0	48	0	England	3		
Auston Trusty †$	DF	2022–2023	44	4	48	4	United States	1		
Peter Withe	FW	1975–1976; 1987	43	11	48	11	England	0	(Note: Sheffield United)	
Nicklas Bendtner †	FW	2006–2007	42	11	48	13	Denmark	6		
Willum Þór Willumsson *	MF	2024–present	41	6	48	7	Iceland	7		
Toine van Mierlo	MF	1981–1982	44	4	47	4	Netherlands	0		
Boaz Myhill †	GK	2011–2012	42	0	47	0	Wales; England U20	0	(Note: West Bromwich Albion)	
Tomoki Iwata *	MF	2024–present	40	6	47	8	Japan	0		
Tommy Carroll	DF	1971–1972	38	0	47	0	Republic of Ireland	9	(Note: Ipswich Town)	
Marc Leonard *	MF	2024–present	35	0	47	0	Scotland U21	—		
Jimmy Daws	HB	1920–1923	46	1	46	1	—	—		
Jack Butland	GK	2012–2013	46	0	46	0	England; Great Britain	1	(Note: Stoke City)	
Mick Halsall	MF	1983–1984	36	3	46	3	England youth	—		
Bobby Hope	FW	1972–1975	34	5	46	5	Scotland	0		
Charlie Hare	FW	1896–1898	43	14	45	14	—	—		
Dan Crowley	MF	2019–2020	41	1	45	2	England U19; Republic of Ireland U17	—		
Willie Robb	GK	1914–1915	40	0	45	0	Scotland	0		
Gary Breen	DF	1996–1997	40	2	45	2	Republic of Ireland	6		
Manny Longelo *	DF	2022–present	40	1	45	1	—	—		
George Smith	MF	1971–1973	39	0	45	0	—	—		
George Haywood	FW	1929–1934	38	15	45	19	—	—		
Ryan Allsop *	GK	2024–present	38	0	45	0	England U17	—		
José Dominguez	MF	1994–1996	35	3	45	4	Portugal	0		
Iván Sánchez	MF	2020–2021	42	2	44	2	—	—		
Jude Bellingham	MF	2019–2020	41	4	44	4	England	0		
Jack Kidd	FW	1910–1912	40	8	44	8	—	—		
Bill Hastings	FW	1912–1914	40	7	44	7	—	—		
Mark Cooper	MF	1991–1992	39	4	44	5	—	—		
David Smith	MF	1993–1994	38	3	44	3	England U21	—		
Ben Davies *†	DF	2024–present	35	1	44	1	—	—	(Note: Rangers)	
Pat Howard	DF	1977–1979	40	0	43	0	—	—		
Ben Foster $	GK	2010–2011	38	0	43	0	England	1		
Steve Bryant	DF	1973–1976	36	1	43	1	—	—		
Morgaro Gomis	MF	2011–2013	31	0	43	0	Senegal	0		
Bill Hunter	HB	1921–1926	41	0	42	0	—	—		
Jimmy Dailey	FW	1949–1952	41	14	42	14	—	—		
Bill Purves	FB	1894–1895	40	0	42	0	—	—	(Note: Matthews attributes Bernard Pumfrey's 30 December 1893 appearance against Lincoln City to Purves, who did not join Small Heath until March 1894.)	
Ken Rowley	FW	1951–1954	40	19	42	20	—	—		
Cammie Fraser	DF	1965–1966	39	0	42	0	Scotland U23	—		
George Parris	DF	1993–1995	39	1	42	2	English Schools	—		
Cheikh Ndoye	MF	2017–2018	39	0	42	0	Senegal	10		
John Trewick	MF / DF	1987–1989	37	0	42	0	England youth	—		
Colin Robinson	FW	1988–1989	37	6	42	6	—	—		
Peter Løvenkrands	MF	2012–2014	37	4	42	8	Denmark	0		
George Short	U	1888–1894	31	5	42	6	—	—		
George Hall *	MF	2022–present	40	2	41	2	England U19	—		
Hannibal Mejbri †	MF	2022–2023	38	1	41	1	Tunisia; France U17	4		
Darran Rowbotham	FW	1992–1993	36	6	41	6	Wales youth	—		
Joe Hart †$	GK	2009–2010	36	0	41	0	England	0	(Note: Manchester City)	
Gary Jones	FW	1976–1977	35	1	41	1	—	—		
Walter Main	FW	1899–1901	33	11	41	14	—	—		
Taylor Gardner-Hickman *†	MF	2024–present	32	3	41	3	England U20	—	(Note: Bristol City)	
Jock Mulraney	FW	1946–1947	27	8	41	16	—	—		
Richard Forsyth	MF	1995–1996	26	2	41	2	England semi-pro	—		
Bobby Brennan	FW	1949–1950	39	7	40	7	Ireland	3		
David Stockdale	GK	2017–2019	36	0	40	0	England C	—		
Tom Adeyemi	MF	2013–2014	35	1	40	3	—	—		
Mark Jones	DF	1984–1986	34	0	40	0	—	—		
Kevin Long	DF	2023–2024	34	1	40	2	Republic of Ireland	0		
Barry Horne	MF	1996–1997	33	0	40	0	Wales	5		
Mitch Hancox	DF	2012–2015	33	0	40	0	—	—		
Viv Solomon-Otabor	MF	2015–2018	33	2	40	2	—	—		
Bob Fairman	FB / HB	1907–1909; 1912–1914	38	2	39	2	—	—		
Dave Mangnall	FW	1934–1935	37	14	39	15	—	—		
Hayden Mullins	MF	2012–2014	36	2	39	2	England U21	—		
Robert Tesche	MF	2015; 2016–2017	36	2	39	3	—	—	(Note: Nottingham Forest)	
Jack Jones	FW	1895–1897	35	15	39	18	—	—		
Geoff Cox	FW	1952–1957	35	3	39	4	—	—		
Lee Buchanan *	DF	2023–present	35	1	39	1	England U21	—		
Tommy Mooney	FW	2001–2002	34	13	39	15	—	—		
Neil Danns	MF	2006–2007	31	3	39	3	Guyana	0		
Neil Kilkenny	MF	2005–2007	26	0	39	0	Australia; England U20; Republic of Ireland U19	1		
Walter Freeman	FW	1909–1911	37	11	38	11	—	—		
Aliou Cissé	MF	2002–2004	36	0	38	0	Senegal	8		
Emilio Nsue	MF	2017–2018	36	1	38	1	Equatorial Guinea; Spain U21	2		
Thomas Oakes	FW	1897–1899	35	8	38	8	—	—		
Jackie Brown	FW	1938–1939	34	6	38	7	Ireland; Republic of Ireland	3; 0		
Harold Roberts	FW	1948–1950	34	2	38	3	—	—		
Siriki Dembélé	MF	2023–2024	34	6	38	6	—	—		
Ron Fenton	FW	1965–1967	33	7	38	8	—	—	(Note: Matthews omits Fenton's substitute appearance against Arsenal in the 1966–67 FA Cup.)	
Gerry Daly	MF	1984–1985	32	1	38	1	Republic of Ireland	5		
Steve Castle	MF	1995–1996	23	1	38	2	—	—		
Phil Hawker	DF	1980–1982	35	1	37	1	England youth	—		
David Rennie	DF / MF	1992–1993	35	4	37	4	Scotland youth	—		
Dennis Mortimer	MF	1986–1987	33	4	37	6	England B	—		
Jack Beattie	FW	1937	36	10	36	10	—	—		
Jimmy Greenhoff	FW	1968–1969	31	14	36	15	England U23	—		
Christian Benítez †	FW	2009–2010	30	3	36	4	Ecuador	4	(Note: Santos Laguna)	
Peter Shearer	FW	1984–1985; 1994–1995	29	7	36	13	England semi-pro	—		
Luke Harris *†	MF	2024–present	29	3	36	4	Wales U21	—		
Nick Platnauer	DF / MF	1984–1986	28	2	36	2	—	—		
Jordon Mutch	MF	2008–2012	24	2	36	2	England U21	—		
Jack Elkes	FW	1919–1921	34	15	35	15	—	—		
Marcus Bent	FW	2008–2009	33	3	35	3	England U21	—		
Billy Ellis	FW	1927–1928	32	8	35	8	—	—		
Walter Pandiani	FW	2005–2006	31	6	35	6	Uruguay	0	(Note: Deportivo la Coruña)	
Tony Godden	GK	1987–1988	29	0	35	0	—	—		
Eddy Stanley	FW	1882–1890	13	5	35	17	—	—		
Jack Sykes	FB	1934–1937	33	0	34	0	—	—		
Sam Gallagher †	FW	2017–2018	33	6	34	7	England U20; Scotland U19	—		
Stan Hauser	GK	1913–1922	31	0	34	0	England amateur	—		
Joe Loughran	HB	1935–1937	31	2	34	2	—	—		
Neil Freeman	GK	1978–1980	31	0	34	0	—	—		
Jérémie Boga †	MF	2017–2018	31	2	34	2	Ivory Coast; France U19	0	(Note: Chelsea)	
Shane Ferguson †	MF	2013; 2013–2014	29	1	34	1	Northern Ireland	8	(Note: Newcastle United)	
Jake Clarke-Salter †	DF	2019–2021	29	1	34	1	England U21	—		
Trevor Aylott	FW	1990–1991	27	0	34	1	—	—		
Paul Hendrie	FW	1973–1975	22	1	34	1	—	—		
James Moles	HB	1909–1911	33	0	33	0	—	—		
Jackie Goodwin	FW	1946–1949	32	8	33	8	—	—		
Ryan Woods	MF	2021–2022	32	0	33	0	—	—		
Bert Millard	U	1919–1920	31	14	33	15	—	—		
Sam Smith	FW	1931–1934	31	13	33	13	—	—		
Steve McGavin	FW	1994–1995	23	2	33	7	—	—		
Wally Clark	FW	1923–1924	32	0	32	0	—	—		
Martin McDonnell	HB	1947–1949	32	0	32	0	—	—		
Charles Partridge	GK	1890–1895	31	0	32	0	—	—		
John Sleeuwenhoek	DF	1967–1970	30	0	32	0	England U23	—		
Connor Mahoney †	MF	2018–2019	30	2	32	2	England U20	—		
Frank Hodges	FW	1913–1915	27	4	32	5	—	—		
Adrian Bird	DF	1986–1989	27	0	32	1	—	—		
Graham Potter	MF / DF	1992–1993	25	2	32	2	England U21	—		
Lyndon Dykes *	FW	2024–present	25	1	32	5	Scotland	4		
Jiří Jarošík †	MF	2005–2006	24	5	32	8	Czech Republic	1		
Thomas Jones	FW	1910–1911	31	12	31	12	—	—		
Albert Clarke	FW	1936–1938	31	9	31	9	—	—		
Joe Barratt	FW	1922–1923	30	1	31	1	—	—		
Christophe Dugarry ‡	FW	2003–2004	30	6	31	6	France	0	(Note: Bordeaux)	
Fred Roberts	FW	1933–1934	29	9	31	9	—	—		
Mickey Bullock	FW	1964–1967	27	10	31	11	English schools	—		
Darren Wassall	DF	1997–1999	25	0	31	0	—	—		
Harry King	FW	1907–1910	29	6	30	7	—	—		
Stewart Barrowclough	MF	1978–1979	29	2	30	2	England U23	—		
Billy Walker	FW	1913–1919	28	10	30	10	—	—		
Tony Hateley	FW	1969–1970	28	6	30	6	—	—		
Riley McGree †	MF	2020–2021	28	3	30	3	Australia	7	(Note: Charlotte FC)	
Cody Drameh †	DF	2023–2024	28	0	30	0	England U21	—	(Note: Leeds United)	
Ravel Morrison †	MF	2012–2013	27	3	30	3	Jamaica; England U21	0		
Colin Gordon	FW	1989–1991	26	3	30	3	—	—		
Frederick Heath	U	1889–1891	25	2	30	3	—	—		
David Burrows	DF	2000–2002	25	0	30	0	England B	—		
Kevin Miller	GK	1993–1994	24	0	30	0	—	—		
Neil Doherty	FW	1994–1995	23	2	30	2	—	—		
Josh Dacres-Cogley	DF	2016–2021	23	0	30	0	—	—		
Jimmy Singer	FW	1960–1961	20	8	30	15	—	—		
Pablo Ibáñez	DF	2011–2012	19	0	30	0	Spain	0		
Adam Rooney	FW	2011–2012	18	4	30	7	Republic of Ireland U21	—		
George Davies	FW	1919–1922	29	7	29	7	—	—		
Steve Fox	FW	1977–1978	29	1	29	1	—	—		
Ernest Pointer	GK	1896–1897	28	0	29	0	—	—		
Arthur Box	GK	1909–1910	28	0	29	0	—	—		
Arthur Reed	FW	1912–1915	28	12	29	12	—	—		
Alex Harley	FW	1963–1964	28	9	29	9	—	—		
Alan Buckley	FW	1978–1979	28	8	29	8	—	—		
Kerim Mrabti	MF	2019–2020	27	3	29	3	Sweden	0		
Carl Shutt	FW	1993–1994	26	4	29	4	—	—		
Nicky Butt †	MF	2005–2006	24	3	29	3	England	0		
Chris Wood †	FW	2011–2012	23	9	29	11	New Zealand	0		
Roly Harper	FW	1905–1907	22	1	29	2	—	—		
Kenny Lowe	MF	1993–1995	21	3	29	3	England semi-pro	—		
Guirane N'Daw †	MF	2011–2012	19	0	29	0	Senegal	4	(Note: AS Saint-Étienne)	
Fred Foxall	FW	1922–1923	28	4	28	4	—	—		
Jack Russell	FW	1924–1927	27	1	28	2	—	—		
Isaac Lea	HB	1932–1937	27	1	28	1	—	—		
Peter Bullock	FW	1962–1965	27	3	28	4	England youth	—		
Mikel San José	MF	2020–2021	27	0	28	0	Spain	0		
Muzzy Izzet	MF	2004–2006	26	1	28	1	Turkey	1		
Diego Fabbrini	MF	2015; 2016–2017	26	0	28	0	Italy	0	(Note: Watford)	
Dan Burn †	DF	2013–2014	24	0	28	1	England	0		
Jovan Kirovski	FW	2002–2004	23	2	28	2	United States	5		
Neil Whatmore	FW	1981–1982	26	6	27	7	—	—		
Robert Firth	FW	1909–1911	25	2	27	2	—	—		
Bruno Ngotty	DF	2006–2007	25	1	27	2	France	0		
Keith Bannister	HB	1952–1953	22	0	27	0	England youth	—		
Mark Sale	FW	1992–1993	21	0	27	3	—	—		
Steve Phillips	FW	1971–1975	20	1	27	1	England U18	—		
Wally Smith	FW	1914–1915	26	4	26	4	—	—		
Olivier Kapo	MF	2007–2008	26	5	26	5	France	0		
Billy Rudd	FW	1960–1961	24	3	26	4	—	—		
Jobe Bellingham	MF	2022–2023	24	0	26	0	England U21	—		
Paul Harding	MF	1993–1994	22	0	26	1	—	—	(Note: Notts County)	
Ted McMinn	MF	1993–1994	22	0	26	0	—	—		
Walter Gittins	FB	1889–1890	21	0	26	0	—	—		
Billy Pratt	FW	1889–1891	21	1	26	1	—	—		
Bart Griemink	GK	1995–1996	20	0	26	0	—	—		
Darren Rogers	DF	1992–1994	18	0	26	0	—	—		
Paul Cooper	GK	1972–1973	17	0	26	0	—	—		
Charles Izon	FW	1893–1897	25	8	25	8	—	—		
Charlie Phillips	FW	1938–1939	24	9	25	10	Wales	0		
Álvaro Giménez	FW	2019–2020	24	3	25	3	Spain U17	—		
Emanuel Aiwu †	DF	2023–2024	24	0	25	0	Austria U21	—	(Note: Cremonese)	
Don Weston	FW	1960	23	3	25	3	—	—		
Mick Ferguson	FW	1982–1984	22	9	25	9	—	—	(Note: Everton)	
Mick Rathbone	DF	1976–1978	20	0	25	0	England youth	—		

== Footnotes ==
Player statistics include games played while on loan from clubs listed below. Unless individually sourced, loaning clubs come from the appearances source or from "Birmingham City: 1946/47–2013/14". Post War English & Scottish Football League A–Z Players Database. Neil Brown. Archived from the original on 9 June 2019.

== Sources ==
- Matthews, Tony (1995). Birmingham City: A Complete Record. Derby: Breedon Books. ISBN 978-1-85983-010-9.
- Matthews, Tony (2000). The Encyclopedia of Birmingham City Football Club 1875–2000. Cradley Heath: Britespot. ISBN 978-0-9539288-0-4.
- Matthews, Tony (2010). Birmingham City: The Complete Record. Derby: Derby Books. ISBN 978-1-85983-853-2.
- Rollin, Glenda; Rollin, Jack, eds. (2010). Sky Sports Football Yearbook 2010–2011. Headline. ISBN 978-0-7553-6107-6.
- "Birmingham City". Soccerbase. Centurycomm.
