= 1911–12 Birmingham F.C. season =

Birmingham F.C.
1911–12 season
- Chairman: Howard Cant
- Manager: Bob McRoberts
- Ground: St Andrew's
- Football League Second Division: 12th
- FA Cup: First round (eliminated by Barnsley)
- Top goalscorer: League: Jack Hall (21); All: Jack Hall (21)
- Highest home attendance: 35,000 vs Burnley, 6 April 1912
- Lowest home attendance: 4,000 vs Blackpool, 16 December 1911
- Average home league attendance: 12,632
Team colours

The 1911–12 Football League season was Birmingham Football Club's 20th in the Football League and their 12th in the Second Division. They finished in 12th position in the 20-team division. They also took part in the 1911–12 FA Cup, entering at the first round proper and losing in that round to Barnsley after a replay. Off the field, Howard Cant succeeded Walter W. Hart as club chairman.

Thirty-one players made at least one appearance in nationally organised first-team competition, and there were fifteen different goalscorers. Full-back Frank Womack was ever-present over the 40-match season. Jack Hall was leading scorer with 21 goals, all of which came in the league.

== Football League Second Division ==
| Date | League position | Opponents | Venue | Result | Score F–A | Scorers | Attendance |
|---|---|---|---|---|---|---|---|
| 2 September 1911 | 13th | Bradford Park Avenue | H | L | 2–3 | Kidd 2 (1 pen) | 20,000 |
| 9 September 1911 | 18th | Fulham | A | L | 1–3 | Hall | 12,000 |
| 11 September 1911 | 19th | Barnsley | H | L | 1–3 | Millington | 5,000 |
| 16 September 1911 | 19th | Derby County | H | L | 0–4 | | 12,000 |
| 23 September 1911 | 20th | Stockport County | A | L | 0–2 | | 7,000 |
| 30 September 1911 | 18th | Leeds City | H | W | 4–3 | Hall 4 | 10,000 |
| 7 October 1911 | 18th | Wolverhampton Wanderers | A | L | 0–1 | | 12,000 |
| 14 October 1911 | 18th | Leicester Fosse | H | W | 4–0 | Hall 2, Graham | 12,000 |
| 21 October 1911 | 18th | Gainsborough Trinity | A | D | 0–0 | | 3,000 |
| 28 October 1911 | 18th | Grimsby Town | H | D | 2–2 | Hall pen, Gildea | 15,000 |
| 4 November 1911 | 17th | Nottingham Forest | A | W | 1–0 | Graham | 14,000 |
| 11 November 1911 | 18th | Chelsea | H | L | 1–4 | Gibson | 20,000 |
| 18 November 1911 | 18th | Clapton Orient | A | L | 0–2 | | 4,000 |
| 25 November 1911 | 17th | Bristol City | H | D | 0–0 | | 10,000 |
| 2 December 1911 | 17th | Burnley | A | D | 1–1 | T. Jones | 14,000 |
| 9 December 1911 | 16th | Huddersfield Town | A | L | 2–3 | Kidd, Millington | 3,500 |
| 16 December 1911 | 16th | Blackpool | H | W | 2–1 | Hall, Kidd | 4,000 |
| 23 December 1911 | 16th | Glossop | A | L | 0–2 | | 2,000 |
| 25 December 1911 | 17th | Hull City | A | L | 0–4 | | 10,000 |
| 26 December 1911 | 16th | Hull City | H | W | 5–1 | Kidd 2, Millington, Hall, Graham | 10,000 |
| 30 December 1911 | 17th | Bradford Park Avenue | A | L | 0–3 | | 15,000 |
| 6 January 1912 | 17th | Fulham | H | L | 1–3 | Tinkler | 7,000 |
| 27 January 1912 | 16th | Stockport County | H | W | 2–0 | Conlin, Robertson | 12,000 |
| 3 February 1912 | 16th | Gainsborough Trinity | H | D | 2–2 | W.H. Jones, Hall | 10,000 |
| 10 February 1912 | 15th | Wolverhampton Wanderers | H | W | 3–1 | Hall 3 (1 pen) | 20,000 |
| 17 February 1912 | 17th | Leicester Fosse | A | D | 2–5 | Conlin, W.H. Jones pen | 10,000 |
| 21 February 1912 | 15th | Derby County | A | W | 1–0 | Gardner | 5,000 |
| 2 March 1912 | 18th | Grimsby Town | A | L | 0–1 | | 5,000 |
| 9 March 1912 | 16th | Nottingham Forest | H | W | 4–2 | W.H. Jones 2, Hastings, Hall | 12,000 |
| 16 March 1912 | 15th | Chelsea | A | W | 2–0 | Hall, Robertson | 30,000 |
| 23 March 1912 | 12th | Clapton Orient | H | W | 4–0 | Hall 3, W.H. Jones pen | 10,000 |
| 30 March 1912 | 13th | Bristol City | A | L | 1–2 | Hastings | 5,000 |
| 5 April 1912 | 14th | Leeds City | A | D | 0–0 | | 5,000 |
| 6 April 1912 | 12th | Burnley | H | W | 4–0 | Hall, Reed 2, Hastings | 35,000 |
| 8 April 1912 | 15th | Barnsley | A | L | 0–1 | | 5,000 |
| 13 April 1912 | 14th | Huddersfield Town | H | W | 1–0 | Hall | 10,000 |
| 20 April 1912 | 15th | Blackpool | A | L | 0–1 | | 3,000 |
| 27 April 1912 | 12th | Glossop | H | W | 2–0 | Robertson 2 | 6,000 |

=== League table (part) ===
Final Second Division table (part)
| Pos | Club | Pld | W | D | L | F | A | GA | Pts |
|---|---|---|---|---|---|---|---|---|---|
| 10th | Leicester City | 38 | 15 | 7 | 16 | 49 | 66 | 0.74 | 37 |
| 11th | Bradford Park Avenue | 38 | 13 | 9 | 16 | 44 | 45 | 0.98 | 35 |
| 12th | Birmingham | 38 | 14 | 6 | 18 | 55 | 59 | 0.93 | 34 |
| 13th | Bristol City | 38 | 14 | 6 | 18 | 41 | 60 | 0.68 | 34 |
| 14th | Blackpool | 38 | 13 | 8 | 17 | 32 | 52 | 0.61 | 34 |
| Key | Pos = League position; Pld = Matches played; W = Matches won; D = Matches drawn; L = Matches lost; F = Goals for; A = Goals against; GA = Goal average; Pts = Points | | | | | | | | |
| Source | | | | | | | | | |

== FA Cup ==
| Round | Date | Opponents | Venue | Result | Score F–A | Scorers | Attendance |
|---|---|---|---|---|---|---|---|
| First round | 13 January 1912 | Barnsley | H | D | 0–0 | | 19,500 |
| First round replay | 22 January 1912 | Barnsley | A | L | 0–3 | | 11,900 |

== Appearances and goals ==
This table includes appearances and goals in nationally organised competitive matches – the Football League and FA Cup – only.
For a description of the playing positions, see Formation (association football)#2–3–5 (Pyramid).
Players marked † left the club during the playing season.

Players' appearances and goals by competition
| Name | Position | League | | FA Cup | | Total | |
| Name | Position | Apps | Goals | Apps | Goals | Apps | Goals |
|---|---|---|---|---|---|---|---|
| Horace Bailey | Goalkeeper | 29 | 0 | 2 | 0 | 31 | 0 |
| Bert Crossthwaite | Goalkeeper | 4 | 0 | 0 | 0 | 4 | 0 |
| Jack Dorrington | Goalkeeper | 4 | 0 | 0 | 0 | 4 | 0 |
| Billy George | Goalkeeper | 1 | 0 | 0 | 0 | 1 | 0 |
| William Ball | Full back | 26 | 0 | 2 | 0 | 28 | 0 |
| Thomas Daykin | Full back | 13 | 0 | 2 | 0 | 15 | 0 |
| Arthur Green | Full back | 1 | 0 | 0 | 0 | 1 | 0 |
| Frank Womack | Full back | 38 | 0 | 2 | 0 | 40 | 2 |
| James Bumphrey | Half back | 31 | 0 | 0 | 0 | 31 | 0 |
| Albert Gardner | Half back | 22 | 1 | 2 | 0 | 24 | 1 |
| Willie Gildea † | Half back | 18 | 1 | 2 | 0 | 20 | 1 |
| Alec McClure | Half back | 7 | 0 | 0 | 0 | 7 | 0 |
| George Robertson | Half back | 30 | 4 | 0 | 0 | 30 | 4 |
| Alf Tinkler | Half back | 19 | 1 | 0 | 0 | 19 | 1 |
| Walter Wigmore | Half back | 3 | 0 | 0 | 0 | 3 | 0 |
| Harry Bates | Forward | 2 | 0 | 0 | 0 | 2 | 0 |
| James Conlin | Forward | 21 | 2 | 2 | 0 | 23 | 2 |
| Richard Gibson | Forward | 22 | 1 | 1 | 0 | 23 | 1 |
| Harry Graham | Forward | 12 | 4 | 0 | 0 | 12 | 4 |
| Thomas Greer | Forward | 1 | 0 | 0 | 0 | 1 | 0 |
| Jack Hall | Forward | 35 | 21 | 2 | 0 | 37 | 21 |
| Ian Hastie | Forward | 1 | 0 | 0 | 0 | 1 | 0 |
| Bill Hastings | Forward | 14 | 3 | 0 | 0 | 14 | 3 |
| Billy Jones | Forward | 11 | 5 | 1 | 0 | 12 | 5 |
| Thomas Jones | Forward | 3 | 1 | 0 | 0 | 3 | 1 |
| Jack Kidd | Forward | 14 | 6 | 2 | 0 | 16 | 6 |
| Jack McKay | Forward | 4 | 0 | 0 | 0 | 4 | 0 |
| Charlie Millington | Forward | 22 | 3 | 2 | 0 | 24 | 3 |
| David Morris | Forward | 3 | 0 | 0 | 0 | 3 | 0 |
| Arthur Reed | Forward | 4 | 2 | 0 | 0 | 4 | 2 |
| Sid Webb | Forward | 3 | 0 | 0 | 0 | 3 | 0 |

== See also ==
- Birmingham City F.C. seasons
