= 1914–15 Birmingham F.C. season =

Birmingham F.C.
1914–15 season
- Chairman: Howard Cant
- Manager: Bob McRoberts
- Ground: St Andrew's
- Football League Second Division: 6th
- FA Cup: Third round (eliminated by Oldham Athletic)
- Top goalscorer: League: Andy Smith (21); All: Andy Smith (24)
- Highest home attendance: 39,024 vs Oldham Athletic, FA Cup 3rd round, 20 February 1915
- Lowest home attendance: 5,000 (four matches)
- Average home league attendance: 11,526
Team colours

The 1914–15 Football League season, the last to be played before the league was abandoned because of the First World War, was Birmingham Football Club's 23rd in the Football League and their 15th in the Second Division. They finished in sixth position in the 20-team division. They also took part in the 1914–15 FA Cup, entering at the first round proper and losing to Oldham Athletic in the third round (last 16).

Twenty-three players made at least one appearance in nationally organised first-team competition, and there were thirteen different goalscorers. Goalkeeper Willie Robb and forward Richard Gibson were ever-present over the 43-match season; full-back Frank Womack and half-back Percy Barton each missed only one game. Andy Smith was leading scorer with 24 goals, of which 21 came in the league.

== Football League Second Division ==
Date	League position	Opponents	Venue	Result	Score F–A	Scorers	Attendance
2 September 1914	5th	Nottingham Forest	A	D	1–1	W. Smith	5,000
5 September 1914	17th	Leicester Fosse	A	L	0–1		4,000
12 September 1914	11th	Barnsley	H	W	2–0	Eyre, A. Smith	10,000
19 September 1914	10th	Glossop	A	D	3–3	Tinkler, A. Smith pen, Gibson	500
26 September 1914	12th	Wolverhampton Wanderers	H	L	1–2	Gibson	20,000
3 October 1914	11th	Fulham	A	W	3–2	Windridge, A. Smith 2	12,000
10 October 1914	14th	Stockport County	H	L	0–1		12,000
17 October 1914	14th	Hull City	A	D	0–0		7,000
24 October 1914	11th	Leeds City	H	W	6–3	A. Smith 3, Barton, Windridge, Gibson	8,000
31 October 1914	12th	Clapton Orient	A	D	1–1	Gibson	8,000
7 November 1914	8th	Woolwich Arsenal	H	W	3–0	A. Smith 2, Gibson	15,000
14 November 1914	12th	Derby County	A	L	0–1		7,000
21 November 1914	9th	Lincoln City	H	W	2–0	Gibson, A. Smith pen	5,000
28 November 1914	7th	Blackpool	H	W	3–0	Gibson, W. Smith, A. Smith pen	5,000
5 December 1914	9th	Grimsby Town	A	L	0–1		4,000
12 December 1914	5th	Huddersfield Town	H	W	1–0	Duncan	12,000
19 December 1914	4th	Bristol City	A	W	3–2	Barton, A. Smith, Gibson	4,000
25 December 1914	3rd	Bury	H	W	1–0	Gibson	20,000
26 December 1914	4th	Bury	A	W	3–1	Roulson 2, Windridge	5,000
28 December 1914	3rd	Nottingham Forest	H	W	3–0	A. Smith 2 (1 pen), Hodges	25,000
2 January 1915	2nd	Leicester Fosse	H	W	2–0	Gibson, Windridge	16,000
6 January 1915	2nd	Glossop	H	W	11–1	A. Smith 4, Windridge 5 (1 pen), Eyre, Hodges	8,000
13 February 1915	3rd	Stockport County	A	L	1–3	A. Smith	4,000
27 February 1915	5th	Leeds City	A	L	0–2		7,000
1 March 1915	4th	Fulham	H	W	1–0	Barton	5,000
6 March 1915	3rd	Clapton Orient	H	W	1–0	A. Smith	15,000
8 March 1915	4th	Barnsley	A	L	1–2	Roulson	3,000
13 March 1915	5th	Woolwich Arsenal	A	L	0–1		19,067
20 March 1915	5th	Derby County	H	L	0–2		18,000
24 March 1915	5th	Hull City	H	D	2–2	Reed, A. Smith	5,000
27 March 1915	4th	Lincoln City	A	W	1–0	Morgan	3,000
2 April 1915	4th	Preston North End	A	L	0–2		10,000
5 April 1915	5th	Preston North End	H	D	1–1	Hodges	10,000
10 April 1915	6th	Grimsby Town	H	W	3–0	Windridge, Barton, Roulson pen	10,000
14 April 1915	6th	Blackpool	A	L	1–3	W. Smith	5,000
17 April 1915	5th	Huddersfield Town	A	D	0–0		4,000
19 April 1915	5th	Wolverhampton Wanderers	A	D	0–0		8,000
24 April 1915	6th	Bristol City	H	D	1–1	Windridge	10,000

=== League table (part) ===
Final Second Division table (part)
Pos	Club	Pld	W	D	L	F	A	GA	Pts
4th	Wolverhampton Wanderers	38	19	7	12	77	52	1.48	45
5th	Woolwich Arsenal	38	19	5	14	69	42	1.68	43
6th	Birmingham	38	17	9	12	62	39	1.59	43
7th	Hull City	38	19	5	14	65	54	1.20	43
8th	Huddersfield Town	38	17	8	13	61	42	1.45	42
Key	Pos = League position; Pld = Matches played; W = Matches won; D = Matches drawn; L = Matches lost; F = Goals for; A = Goals against; GA = Goal average; Pts = Points								
Source									

== FA Cup ==
Round	Date	Opponents	Venue	Result	Score F–A	Scorers	Attendance
First round	9 January 1915	Crystal Palace	H	D	2–2	A. Smith pen, Eyre	18,000
First round replay	January 1915	Crystal Palace	H *	W	3–0 a.e.t.	Gibson, Tinkler, A. Smith	17,000
Second round	30 January 1915	Brighton & Hove Albion	A	D	0–0 a.e.t.		9,000
Second round replay	6 February 1915	Brighton & Hove Albion	H	W	3–0	Gibson, Morgan, A. Smith	28,000
Third round	20 February 1915	Oldham Athletic	H	L	2–3	Gibson, Hodges	39,024

* Crystal Palace forfeited home advantage for the replay.

== Appearances and goals ==
This table includes appearances and goals in nationally organised competitive matches – the Football League and FA Cup – only.
For a description of the playing positions, see Formation (association football)#2–3–5 (Pyramid).

Players' appearances and goals by competition
Name	Position	League		FA Cup		Total	
Name	Position	Apps	Goals	Apps	Goals	Apps	Goals
William Robb	Goalkeeper	38	0	5	0	43	0
William Ball	Full back	36	0	4	0	40	0
Arthur Stanton	Full back	2	0	0	0	2	0
Frank Womack	Full back	37	0	5	0	42	0
Percy Barton	Half back	37	4	5	0	42	4
James Bumphrey	Half back	18	0	0	0	18	0
Ernie Edwards	Half back	2	0	0	0	2	0
Albert Gardner	Half back	6	0	1	0	7	0
Alec McClure	Half back	4	0	0	0	4	0
Joe Roulson	Half back	21	4	5	0	26	4
Alf Tinkler	Half back	29	1	5	1	30	2
Charlie Duncan	Forward	4	1	0	0	4	1
Edmund Eyre	Forward	23	2	3	1	26	3
Richard Gibson	Forward	38	10	5	3	43	13
Jack Hall	Forward	4	0	0	0	4	0
Frank Hodges	Forward	17	3	5	1	22	4
Billy Morgan	Forward	8	1	2	1	10	2
Arthur Reed	Forward	3	1	0	0	3	1
Andy Smith	Forward	30	21	5	3	35	24
Wally Smith	Forward	21	3	0	0	21	3
Charles Sprigg	Forward	9	0	2	0	11	0
Billy Walker	Forward	5	0	0	0	5	0
Jimmy Windridge	Forward	26	11	3	0	29	11

== See also ==
- Birmingham City F.C. seasons
