= 1912–13 Birmingham F.C. season =

Birmingham
1912–13 season
- Chairman: Howard Cant
- Manager: Bob McRoberts
- Ground: St Andrew's
- Football League Second Division: 3rd
- FA Cup: First round (eliminated by Manchester City)
- Top goalscorer: League: Billy Jones (16); All: Billy Jones (16)
- Highest home attendance: 35,000 (three matches)
- Lowest home attendance: 3,000 vs Wolverhampton Wanderers, 14 September 1912
- Average home league attendance: 15,737
Home colours

The 1912–13 Football League season was Birmingham Football Club's 21st in the Football League and their 13th in the Second Division. They finished in third place in the 20-team division, four points behind the promotion positions. They also took part in the 1912–13 FA Cup, entering at the first round proper and losing in that round to Manchester City.

Twenty-five players made at least one appearance in nationally organised first-team competition, and there were eleven different goalscorers. Forward Arthur Smith played in 38 of the 39 matches over the season, and full-back Billy Ball appeared in one fewer. Billy Jones was leading scorer with 16 goals, all of which came in the league.

== Football League Second Division ==
Date	League position	Opponents	Venue	Result	Score F–A	Scorers	Attendance
7 September 1912	13th	Bradford Park Avenue	A	D	0–0		14,000
9 September 1912	4th	Fulham	H	W	2–1	Robertson, Hall	12,000
14 September 1912	7th	Wolverhampton Wanderers	H	D	0–0		3,000
21 September 1912	5th	Leicester Fosse	A	W	2–1	Jones, Robertson	12,000
28 September 1912	4th	Stockport County	H	D	1–1	Hall	20,000
5 October 1912	8th	Preston North End	A	L	0–1		8,000
12 October 1912	4th	Burnley	H	W	3–0	Jones, Hastings, Hall	15,000
19 October 1912	4th	Hull City	A	W	2–1	Jones, Robertson	10,000
26 October 1912	2nd	Glossop	H	D	0–0		5,000
2 November 1912	2nd	Clapton Orient	A	W	2–0	Bumphrey, Jones	10,000
9 November 1912	1st	Lincoln City	H	W	4–1	Hall 2, Jones, Bumphrey	35,000
16 November 1912	3rd	Nottingham Forest	A	L	1–3	Jones	16,000
23 November 1912	1st	Bristol City	H	W	3–0	Hastings, Robertson, Arthur Smith	20,000
30 November 1912	1st	Blackpool	H	W	3–2	Hall, Gardner, Robertson	10,000
7 December 1912	1st	Huddersfield Town	A	D	0–0		7,500
14 December 1912	2nd	Leeds City	H	D	2–2	Andy Smith, Tinkler	20,000
21 December 1912	2nd	Grimsby Town	A	D	2–2	Robertson, Jones	5,000
25 December 1912	2nd	Barnsley	H	W	3–1	Gardner, Robertson 2	35,000
26 December 1912	3rd	Bury	H	L	1–2	Andy Smith	10,000
28 December 1912	3rd	Bradford Park Avenue	H	D	1–1	Jones	20,000
1 January 1913	3rd	Bury	A	L	0–3		6,227
4 January 1913	3rd	Wolverhampton Wanderers	A	D	2–2	Jones 2	7,000
18 January 1913	3rd	Leicester Fosse	H	W	5–1	Arthur Smith, Hall 2, Jones, King og	15,000
25 January 1913	3rd	Stockport County	A	W	1–0	Jones	4,000
8 February 1913	3rd	Preston North End	H	L	0–1		35,000
15 February 1913	3rd	Burnley	A	L	0–3		8,000
22 February 1913	3rd	Hull City	H	W	3–1	Duncan, Robertson, Jones	10,000
1 March 1913	3rd	Glossop	A	W	2–0	Jones, Robertson	3,000
8 March 1913	3rd	Clapton Orient	H	D	1–1	Duncan	14,000
15 March 1913	3rd	Lincoln City	A	W	1–0	Duncan	8,000
22 March 1913	3rd	Nottingham Forest	H	W	2–0	Reed 2	4,000
24 March 1913	3rd	Fulham	A	L	2–3	Robertson, Duncan	8,000
25 March 1913	3rd	Barnsley	A	L	0–1		10,000
29 March 1913	2nd	Bristol City	A	W	3–0	Reed 2, Robertson	5,000
5 April 1913	3rd	Blackpool	A	L	0–2		3,000
12 April 1913	3rd	Huddersfield Town	H	W	3–2	Jones 2, Robertson	10,000
19 April 1913	3rd	Leeds City	A	L	0–4		8,000
26 April 1913	3rd	Grimsby Town	H	W	2–1	Reed 2	6,000

=== League table (part) ===
Final Second Division table (part)
Pos	Club	Pld	W	D	L	F	A	GA	Pts
1st	Preston North End	38	19	15	4	56	33	1.70	53
2nd	Burnley	38	21	8	9	88	53	1.66	50
3rd	Birmingham	38	18	10	10	59	44	1.34	46
4th	Barnsley	38	19	7	12	41	60	1.21	45
5th	Huddersfield Town	38	17	9	12	66	40	1.65	43
Key	Pos = League position; Pld = Matches played; W = Matches won; D = Matches drawn; L = Matches lost; F = Goals for; A = Goals against; GA = Goal average; Pts = Points								
Source									

== FA Cup ==
Round	Date	Opponents	Venue	Result	Score F–A	Scorers	Attendance
First round	11 January 1913	Manchester City	A	L	0–4		17,442

== Appearances and goals ==
This table includes appearances and goals in nationally organised competitive matches – the Football League and FA Cup – only.
For a description of the playing positions, see Formation (association football)#2–3–5 (Pyramid).
Players marked † left the club during the playing season.

Players' appearances and goals by competition
Name	Position	League		FA Cup		Total	
Name	Position	Apps	Goals	Apps	Goals	Apps	Goals
Horace Bailey	Goalkeeper	9	0	1	0	10	0
Bert Crossthwaite	Goalkeeper	28	0	0	0	28	0
Jack Dorrington	Goalkeeper	1	0	0	0	1	0
William Ball	Full back	36	0	1	0	37	0
Bob Fairman	Full back	10	0	1	0	11	0
Frank Womack	Full back	30	0	0	0	30	0
James Bumphrey	Half back	34	2	1	0	35	2
Albert Gardner	Half back	23	2	1	0	24	2
Alec McClure	Half back	19	0	0	0	19	0
Joe Roulson	Half back	8	0	0	0	8	0
Joseph Smith	Half back	4	0	0	0	4	0
Alf Tinkler	Half back	27	1	1	0	28	1
John Ballantyne	Forward	1	0	0	0	1	0
Harry Bates	Forward	1	0	0	0	1	0
Charlie Duncan	Forward	6	4	0	0	6	4
Richard Gibson	Forward	15	0	0	0	15	0
Jack Hall	Forward	22	8	1	0	23	8
Bill Hastings	Forward	15	2	1	0	16	2
Billy Jones	Forward	33	16	1	0	34	16
Billy Morgan	Forward	5	0	0	0	5	0
Arthur Reed	Forward	13	6	0	0	13	6
George Robertson	Forward	30	13	1	0	31	13
Andy Smith	Forward	6	2	0	0	6	2
Arthur Smith	Forward	37	2	1	0	38	2
Charles Sprigg	Forward	5	0	0	0	5	0

== See also ==
- Birmingham City F.C. seasons
