= 1920–21 Birmingham F.C. season =

Birmingham F.C.
1920–21 season
- Chairman: Howard Cant
- Secretary-manager: Frank Richards
- Ground: St Andrew's
- Football League Second Division: 1st (promoted)
- FA Cup: First round (eliminated by Luton Town)
- Top goalscorer: League: Harry Hampton (16); All: Harry Hampton (16)
- Highest home attendance: 60,017 vs West Ham United, 27 December 1920
- Lowest home attendance: 12,000 vs Leicester City, 2 October 1920
- Average home league attendance: 32,531
Home colours

The 1920–21 Football League season was Birmingham Football Club's 25th in the Football League and their 17th in the Second Division. Needing to beat Port Vale away on the last day of the season to maintain their position ahead of Cardiff City and clinch the division title for the second time, they did so, thus earning promotion to the First Division for the 1921–22 season. They also took part in the FA Cup, entering at the first round proper and losing in that round to Luton Town.

Twenty-four players made at least one appearance in nationally organised first-team competition, and there were eleven different goalscorers. Forward Johnny Crosbie was ever-present over the 43-match season. Harry Hampton was leading scorer with 16 goals, all of which came in the league. A 19-year-old called Joe Bradford scored on his competitive debut on Christmas Day at West Ham United; he went on to set goalscoring records for the club of 467 goals, 414 in the league, was their leading scorer for twelve consecutive seasons from 1922 to 1933, and scored seven times in twelve appearances for England.

Off the field, the club bought the freehold of the St Andrew's Ground in 1921 for around £7,000.

== Football League Second Division ==
Date	League position	Opponents	Venue	Result	Score F–A	Scorers	Attendance
28 August 1920	18th	South Shields	A	L	0–3		20,000
31 August 1920	11th	Hull City	H	W	5–1	Crosbie 2, Barton, Lane 2	25,000
4 September 1920	9th	South Shields	H	D	1–1	Whitehouse	35,000
6 September 1920	13th	Hull City	A	L	0–1		13,000
11 September 1920	18th	Cardiff City	A	L	1–2	Crosbie	30,000
18 September 1920	17th	Cardiff City	H	D	1–1	Whitehouse	45,000
25 September 1920	19th	Leicester City	A	L	0–3		17,000
2 October 1920	17th	Leicester City	H	W	5–0	Lane 3, Hampton 2	12,000
9 October 1920	18th	Blackpool	A	L	0–3		10,000
16 October 1920	17th	Blackpool	H	W	3–0	Whitehouse 2 (1 pen), Lane	50,000
23 October 1920	15th	Sheffield Wednesday	A	W	4–1	Whitehouse 2	25,000
30 October 1920	11th	Sheffield Wednesday	H	W	4–0	Crosbie, Whitehouse, Hampton, Lane	30,000
6 November 1920	10th	Wolverhampton Wanderers	A	W	3–0	Burkinshaw, Crosbie, McClure	20,000
13 November 1920	7th	Wolverhampton Wanderers	H	W	4–1	Hampton 2, Barton, Lane	35,000
20 November 1920	4th	Stoke	A	W	2–1	Hampton 2	20,000
27 November 1920	5th	Stoke	H	W	3–0	Lane, Burkinshaw, Crosbie	16,000
4 December 1920	5th	Coventry City	H	W	3–2	Whitehouse 2, Lawrence og	25,000
11 December 1920	3rd	Coventry City	A	W	4–0	Burkinshaw, Lane, Hampton 2	22,000
18 December 1920	2nd	Leeds United	H	W	1–0	McClure	25,000
25 December 1920	3rd	West Ham United	A	D	1–1	Bradford	23,000
27 December 1920	3rd	West Ham United	H	W	2–1	Hampton 2	60,017
1 January 1921	3rd	Leeds United	A	L	0–1		22,000
15 January 1921	1st	Stockport County	A	W	3–0	Crosbie, Lane, Whitehouse	12,000
22 January 1921	1st	Stockport County	H	W	5–0	Lane 2, Crosbie, Whitehouse, Linley	35,000
5 February 1921	1st	Notts County	H	W	2–1	Burkinshaw 2	40,000
12 February 1921	1st	Clapton Orient	A	D	1–1	Burkinshaw	18,000
16 February 1921	1st	Notts County	A	D	0–0		14,000
19 February 1921	1st	Clapton Orient	H	D	0–0		20,000
26 February 1921	1st	Bury	A	W	1–0	Hampton	25,000
5 March 1921	1st	Bury	H	W	4–0	Crosbie 2, Linley, Barton	40,000
12 March 1921	1st	Bristol City	A	W	1–0	Lane	22,000
19 March 1921	1st	Bristol City	H	D	0–0		30,000
25 March 1921	1st	Fulham	A	L	0–5		40,000
26 March 1921	1st	Barnsley	H	L	1–3	Hampton	40,000
29 March 1921	1st	Fulham	H	W	1–0	Booth	30,000
2 April 1921	1st	Barnsley	A	D	1–1	Davies pen	19,000
9 April 1921	1st	Nottingham Forest	H	W	3–0	Crosbie, Lane 2	30,000
16 April 1921	2nd	Nottingham Forest	A	D	1–1	Crosbie	14,000
23 April 1921	2nd	Rotherham County	H	W	3–2	Crosbie 2, Davies	35,127
30 April 1921	1st	Rotherham County	A	D	1–1	Barton	17,000
2 May 1921	1st	Port Vale	H	W	4–0	Hampton, Davies 2 (1 pen), Barton	25,000
7 May 1921	1st	Port Vale	A	W	2–0	Hampton, Davies	10,000

=== League table (part) ===
Final Second Division table (part)
Pos	Club	Pld	W	D	L	F	A	GA	Pts
1st	Birmingham	42	24	10	8	79	38	2.08	58
2nd	Cardiff City	42	24	10	8	59	32	1.84	58
3rd	Bristol City	42	19	13	10	49	29	1.69	51
4th	Blackpool	42	20	10	12	54	42	1.29	50
5th	West Ham United	42	19	10	13	51	30	1.70	48
Key	Pos = League position; Pld = Matches played; W = Matches won; D = Matches drawn; L = Matches lost; F = Goals for; A = Goals against; GA = Goal average; Pts = Points								
Source									

== FA Cup ==
Round	Date	Opponents	Venue	Result	Score F–A	Scorers	Attendance
First round	8 January 1921	Luton Town	A	L	1–2	Barton	12,700

== Appearances and goals ==
This table includes appearances and goals in nationally organised competitive matches – the Football League and FA Cup – only.
For a description of the playing positions, see Formation (association football)#2–3–5 (Pyramid).
Players marked † left the club during the playing season.

Players' appearances and goals by competition
Name	Position	League		FA Cup		Total	
Name	Position	Apps	Goals	Apps	Goals	Apps	Goals
Stan Hauser	Goalkeeper	12	0	0	0	12	0
Dan Tremelling	Goalkeeper	30	0	1	0	31	0
William Ball	Full back	4	0	0	0	4	0
Jack Jones	Full back	37	0	1	0	38	0
Tom White †	Full back	4	0	0	0	4	0
Frank Womack	Full back	38	0	1	0	39	0
Percy Barton	Half back	41	5	1	1	42	6
Bobby Booth	Half back	6	1	0	0	6	1
Jimmy Daws	Half back	11	0	0	0	11	0
George Liddell	Half back	2	0	0	0	2	0
Alec McClure	Half back	40	2	1	0	41	2
Bert Millard †	Half back	2	0	0	0	2	0
Joe Roulson	Half back	22	0	1	0	23	0
Joe Bradford	Forward	4	1	1	0	5	1
Laurie Burkinshaw	Forward	35	6	1	0	36	6
Johnny Crosbie	Forward	42	14	1	0	43	14
George Davies	Forward	10	5	0	0	10	5
Jack Elkes	Forward	2	0	0	0	2	0
Richard Gibson	Forward	7	0	0	0	7	0
Harry Hampton	Forward	29	16	1	0	30	16
Joe Lane	Forward	34	15	0	0	34	15
Ted Linley	Forward	12	2	0	0	12	2
Billy Morgan †	Forward	5	0	0	0	5	0
Jackie Whitehouse	Forward	33	11	1	0	34	11

== See also ==
- Birmingham City F.C. seasons
