= Tom Evans (footballer, born 1896) =

English footballer

Personal information
- Full name: Thomas Eli Evans
- Date of birth: February 1896
- Place of birth: Dudley, England
- Place of death: Stourbridge, England
- Height: 5 ft 7 in (1.70 m)
- Position: Right half

Senior career*
Years	Team	Apps	(Gls)
- Bradley United
- Cradley Heath St Luke's
1917–1921	Birmingham	6	(0)
1921–1922	Brighton & Hove Albion	5	(0)
1922–1927	Cradley Heath		
- * Club domestic league appearances and goals

Thomas Eli Evans (February 1896 – after 1926) was an English professional footballer who played in the Football League for Birmingham and Brighton & Hove Albion.

Evans was born in Dudley, which is now in the West Midlands county. He played local football before joining Birmingham during the First World War. When the Football League resumed, Evans made his debut in the Second Division on 27 September 1919, standing in for Joe Roulson at right half in a home game against Huddersfield Town which Birmingham won 4–2. He played five more games during the 1919–20 season, in each case taking Roulson's place at right half either in his absence or while he switched to the left to replace Percy Barton. Unable to establish himself as a first-team player, Evans spent the 1921–22 season in the Third Division South with Brighton & Hove Albion, but played only five matches when regular right half Jack Woodhouse was unavailable through injury. He then returned to the Black Country where he played for several years in the Birmingham & District League for Cradley Heath.
