= Ernest Edwards =

Ernest Edwards may refer to:

- Ernie Edwards (footballer) (fl. 1892–1931), English professional footballer
- Ernie Edwards (politician), (1912–1974), Australian politician
- Ernest Edwards (journalist), Liverpool Echo sports editor who reported on 1900s association football events such as the naming of Spion Kop terrace
