= Frank Hodges =

Frank Hodges may refer to:

- Frank Hodges (trade unionist) (1887–1947), English trade union leader, General Secretary of the Miners' Federation of Great Britain
- Frank Hodges (footballer) (1891–1985), English footballer
