= Arthur Green (footballer, born 1885) =

English footballer

Personal information
- Date of birth: 1885
- Place of birth: Grantham, England
- Date of death: Unknown
- Place of death: Lincoln, England
- Position: Full back

Senior career*
Years	Team	Apps	(Gls)
- Seaton Main
- Mansfield Town
1911–1912	Birmingham	1	(0)
1912–19??	Lincoln City	0	(0)
–	Mansfield Town		
- * Club domestic league appearances and goals

Arthur Green (1885 – after 1911) was an English professional footballer who played in the Football League for Birmingham. Born in Grantham, Lincolnshire, he began his football career with Seaton Main and Mansfield Town before joining Birmingham in July 1911. He made his debut in the Second Division on 21 October 1911 away at Gainsborough Trinity, stepping in at left back to allow regular incumbent Frank Womack to replace the injured Billy Ball at right back. The game finished goalless, and was the only first-team appearance he made for Birmingham. In 1912 he signed for Lincoln City, but returned to Mansfield without playing first-team football.
