= Alec McClure =

English footballer

Personal information
- Full name: Alexander McClure
- Date of birth: 3 April 1892
- Place of birth: Workington, England
- Date of death: 2 October 1971 (aged 79)
- Place of death: Birmingham, England
- Height: 5 ft 11 1/2 in (1.82 m)
- Position: Centre half

Youth career
- –: Grangetown Juniors

Senior career*
Years	Team	Apps	(Gls)
1912–1923	Birmingham	192	(4)
1923–1924	Aston Villa	7	(0)
1924–1926	Stoke	28	(0)
1926–1928	Coventry City	49	(7)
1928	Walsall	11	(0)
Total		287	(11)
- * Club domestic league appearances and goals

Alexander McClure (3 April 1892 – 2 October 1971) was an English professional footballer who played as a centre half. He played for Birmingham both before and after the First World War, making 198 appearances in all competitions, and helped them win the championship of the Second Division in 1920–21. He also played in the Football League for Aston Villa, Stoke, Coventry City and Walsall.

== Career ==
McClure was born in Workington, Cumberland, on 3 April 1892. He was a powerful player with good positional ability, who captained Birmingham's reserve team before establishing himself as club captain and linchpin of the first team's defence. He played for the Football League XI in 1921–22 against the Irish Football League. After leaving Birmingham he went on to play for four other Midlands teams, Aston Villa, Stoke, Coventry City and Walsall. On retiring from playing he worked for short periods as trainer at various clubs, including as trainer of Birmingham's juniors, and in 1932 he was appointed assistant manager of the club under Leslie Knighton and later under George Liddell.

During the First World War McClure served in the Royal Navy and was involved in the Zeebrugge Raid. After leaving football he worked for Rudge motorcycles and went on to run a successful haulage business in Small Heath, Birmingham. The 1939 Register finds him living with his wife, Amy, in Kenelm Road, Small Heath, and engaged in war work, collecting scrap metal from factories. He was still resident at that address at the time of his death in Birmingham on 2 October 1971 at the age of 79. A nephew, Joe McClure, also became a professional footballer.

== Career statistics ==
Club	Season	League			FA Cup		Total	
Club	Season	Division	Apps	Goals	Apps	Goals	Apps	Goals
Birmingham	1911–12	Second Division	7	0	0	0	7	0
Birmingham	1912–13	Second Division	19	0	0	0	19	0
Birmingham	1913–14	Second Division	16	0	2	0	18	0
Birmingham	1914–15	Second Division	4	0	0	0	4	0
Birmingham	1919–20	Second Division	24	0	2	0	26	0
Birmingham	1920–21	Second Division	40	2	1	0	43	2
Birmingham	1921–22	First Division	35	1	0	0	35	1
Birmingham	1922–23	First Division	38	1	1	0	39	1
Birmingham	1923–24	First Division	9	0	0	0	9	0
Birmingham	Total		192	4	6	0	198	4
Aston Villa	1923–24	First Division	5	0	0	0	5	0
Aston Villa	1924–25	First Division	2	0	0	0	2	0
Aston Villa	Total		7	0	0	0	7	0
Stoke	1924–25	Second Division	24	0	1	0	25	0
Stoke	1925–26	Second Division	4	0	2	0	6	0
Stoke	Total		28	0	3	0	31	0
Coventry City	1926–27	Third Division South	35	6	1	0	36	6
Coventry City	1927–28	Third Division South	14	1	1	0	15	1
Coventry City	Total		49	7	2	0	51	7
Walsall	1927–28	Third Division South	11	0	0	0	11	0
Career total			287	11	11	0	298	11
