= Arthur Stanton =

English footballer (1892–1915)

Personal information
- Full name: Arthur Stanton
- Date of birth: 1892
- Place of birth: Leamore, England
- Date of death: 8 May 1915 (aged 22)
- Place of death: Walsall, England
- Height: 5 ft 8 in (1.73 m)
- Position: Right back

Senior career*
Years	Team	Apps	(Gls)
19??–1912	Bloxwich Strollers		
1912–1915	Birmingham	6	(0)
- * Club domestic league appearances and goals

Arthur Stanton (1892 – 8 May 1915) was an English professional footballer who played in the Football League for Birmingham.

== Life and career ==
Stanton was born in Leamore, Bloxwich, Staffordshire; he was one of ten children of George Stanton, a coal miner, and his wife Sarah. The 1911 Census finds Stanton working as a brickyard labourer and living in Cope Street, Leamore, with his parents and four siblings. Away from football, he enjoyed playing bowls.

Stanton played football for Bloxwich Strollers, helping them win the Walsall and District League title and the Walsall Cup in the 1911–12 season before signing professional forms with Football League Second Division club Birmingham for a fee of £10. In its preview of the 1912–13 season, the Birmingham Gazette described him as "a clever right back of great promise". He was signed as cover at full back, and made his first-team debut on 3 January 1914, deputising for Frank Womack at left back in a home game against Notts County which Birmingham won 2–1. Over the next season and a half, Stanton played five times more in the Second Division, in each case standing in for Womack or his full-back partner Billy Ball, and established a reputation as a solid, powerful defender, albeit one who lacked pace.

During and after a Birmingham League match against West Bromwich Albion reserves on 3 April 1915, Stanton complained of having been elbowed in the mouth by an opponent. Pain in the jaw was still bothering him two weeks later when he contracted influenza. His condition worsened and he was admitted to Walsall Infirmary, where he died on 8 May. A post-mortem examination established the cause of death as tubercular meningitis, and in the opinion of the medical officer, not attributable to the football injury. The coroner's jury returned a verdict of death from natural causes. In Birmingham F.C.'s annual report for the 1914–15 season, the club's directors expressed deep regret at Stanton's untimely death, describing him as "a reliable and earnest player [who] always did his best." He was 22 years old.

== Sources ==
- Matthews, Tony (1995). Birmingham City: A Complete Record. Derby: Breedon Books. ISBN 978-1-85983-010-9.
