= Ian Hastie (footballer) =

English footballer

Personal information
- Full name: Ian Scott Hastie
- Date of birth: 1887
- Place of birth: London, England
- Date of death: Unknown
- Position: Outside right

Senior career*
Years	Team	Apps	(Gls)
- Edmonton Royal
1911–1912	Birmingham	1	(0)
1912–19??	Wycombe Wanderers		
- * Club domestic league appearances and goals

Ian Scott Hastie (1887 – after 1911) was an English professional footballer born in London who played in the Football League for Birmingham. Hastie joined Birmingham from junior football in north London in May 1911, and made his debut on 18 November 1911, standing in for regular outside right Charlie Millington in a 2–0 defeat away at Clapton Orient. This was the only first-team game that Hastie, a good dribbler but lacking awareness of the game as a whole, played for the club before leaving for Wycombe Wanderers at the end of the 1911–12 season.
