= Arthur Foster (footballer, born 1894) =

English footballer and cricketer

Personal information
- Full name: Arthur Webster Foster
- Date of birth: 12 November 1894
- Place of birth: Birmingham, England
- Date of death: 9 January 1954 (aged 59)
- Place of death: Birmingham, England
- Position: Forward

Senior career*
Years	Team	Apps	(Gls)
1913–1914	Birmingham	2	(1)
1914–191x	Acocks Green		
- * Club domestic league appearances and goals

Arthur Webster Foster (12 November 1894 – 9 January 1954) was an English footballer who played in the Football League for Birmingham and cricketer who played for Warwickshire.

== Personal life ==
Foster was born in the Deritend area of Birmingham, and educated at Repton and Downing College, Cambridge. He was the younger brother of Warwickshire and England cricketer Frank Foster. He died in Acocks Green, Birmingham, in 1954 at the age of 59.

== Sporting career ==
=== Football ===
The majority of Foster's football was played for Cambridge University and for clubs and representative teams under the auspices of the Amateur Football Association (A.F.A.) His performance in a Cambridge freshmen's match received a favourable report in The Times:

An extremely useful centre-forward was supplied in Foster, who played really well to his insides. He kept them well together and gave them plenty of splendid opportunities, of which, for the most part, poor use was made."

He scored the decisive goal in the 1914 University Match, and was appointed secretary of the university club for the 1914–15 season. In March 1914, he was selected for a combined Oxford and Cambridge Universities team which beat Chelsea in "the first game in London between an A.F.A. side and a professional team for many years", though he was not at his best: "his shooting was poor, and he passed too much to the left wing". That same month he assisted Old Reptonians to victory in the final of the Arthur Dunn Cup; he contributed many of the 33 goals they scored in reaching that stage, though his playing style had developed an element of selfishness:

A. W. Foster has scored most of the goals, and as a centre-forward he only just lacks greatness, but on Saturday he frequently forgot to make openings for his inside-forwards.

Foster played for the major amateur clubs of the time, both Casuals, for whom he took part in the final of the 1913 A.F.A. Cup, and Corinthians, touring Brazil and scoring twice in a losing cause on the club's return to first-class football against the English Wanderers, an amateur eleven selected by the Football Association.

He found time to turn out twice for Birmingham in the Second Division of the Football League. He made his debut on 4 October 1913 playing at inside left in a 1–1 draw at home to Hull City, and in his second and last game, on Christmas Day of the same year, he scored in a 6–0 defeat of Glossop.

=== Cricket ===
Foster appeared once for Warwickshire in a County Championship match in July 1914. He kept wicket against Northamptonshire, taking two catches, and made 0 and 1 not out with the bat; the match was drawn.
