= Wally Smith (footballer, born 1885) =

English footballer

Personal information
- Full name: Walter Smith
- Date of birth: 1885
- Date of death: May 1917 (aged 31–32)
- Place of death: Western Front
- Height: 5 ft 7 1/2 in (1.71 m)
- Position: Inside forward

Senior career*
Years	Team	Apps	(Gls)
- Southend United
- Chester
1911–1914	Bury	74	(26)
1914–1916	Small Heath	26	(4)
1916–19??	Altrincham		
- * Club domestic league appearances and goals

Walter Smith (1885 – May 1917) was an English professional footballer who scored 30 goals in 100 appearances in the Football League playing for Bury and Birmingham. He played as an inside forward.

Smith was born in Bootle, Lancashire. After an unsuccessful trial with Liverpool in 1907, he played for Southend United and Chester before joining Bury in December 1911. Though his first season ended in relegation from the First Division, Smith stayed another two years, and over his career at Bury he scored at a rate better than one goal every three games. He joined fellow Second Division club Birmingham towards the end of the 1913–14 season. The club were looking for a creative player to supply chances for Andy Smith and Jack Hall, but Smith lost out in this role to England international Jimmy Windridge, whose second spell with Birmingham coincided with Smith's arrival. He went on to play for Altrincham during the First World War.

Smith, a private in the Lincolnshire Regiment, was killed in action during World War I.
