= Harry Bates (footballer) =

English footballer

Personal information
- Date of birth: July 1890
- Place of birth: Sutton Coldfield, England
- Date of death: Unknown
- Place of death: Birmingham, England
- Position: Outside right

Senior career*
Years	Team	Apps	(Gls)
- Ravensmoor
- Coventry City
1911–1913	Birmingham	3	(0)
1913–19??	Walsall		
- * Club domestic league appearances and goals

Harry J. Bates (July 1890 – after 1912) was an English footballer who played in the Football League for Birmingham.

Bates was born in Sutton Coldfield, Warwickshire. An outside right who never turned professional, he played football for Ravensmoor and for Coventry City before joining Birmingham in 1912. He made his debut in the Second Division on 27 January 1912, in a 2–0 home win against Stockport County, and played once more that season and once in 1912–13, but failed to impress, and moved on to Walsall in the 1913 close season. Bates died in Birmingham.
