= Peter Neilson (footballer) =

Scottish footballer

Personal information
- Date of birth: 1890
- Place of birth: Glasgow, Scotland
- Date of death: Unknown
- Position: Outside left

Senior career*
Years	Team	Apps	(Gls)
- Airdrieonians
1913–1914	Birmingham	3	(1)
1914–19??	Wallyford		
- * Club domestic league appearances and goals

Peter M. Neilson (1890 – after 1913) was a Scottish professional footballer who played in the English Football League for Birmingham.

Neilson was born in Glasgow. He played as an outside left for Airdrieonians in the Scottish Football League before coming to England to try his luck in the English Football League. He signed for Second Division club Birmingham in 1913, and made his debut on 11 October 1913 in a 1–1 draw at Burnley. He scored the only goal in the next game at home to Bury, but received criticism for his style of play and returned to Scotland the following year.
