= John Ballantyne (footballer) =

Scottish footballer

Personal information
- Date of birth: 30 June 1892
- Place of birth: Riccarton, Scotland
- Place of death: Scotland
- Height: 5 ft 6 in (1.68 m)
- Position: Outside right

Youth career
- Kenmuirhill Athletic

Senior career*
Years	Team	Apps	(Gls)
1912	Kilmarnock	6	(1)
1912–1913	Vale of Leven	20	(4)
1913–1915	Birmingham	20	(2)
1915–1916	Vale of Leven		
1916	Rangers	1	(0)
1916–1918	Vale of Leven		
1918–19??	Dumfries		
- * Club domestic league appearances and goals

John Ballantyne (30 June 1892 – after 1917) was a Scottish professional footballer who made 20 appearances in the English Football League playing for Birmingham and played for Scottish Football League clubs Kilmarnock, Vale of Leven and Rangers. He played as an outside right.

Ballantyne was born in Riccarton, Ayrshire. He played for Kilmarnock and Vale of Leven before coming to England to join Football League Second Division club Birmingham in April 1913. He made his debut on 26 April 1913, the last day of the 1912–13 season, in a 2–1 win at home to Grimsby Town. He played fairly regularly the following season, but thereafter lost his place to Richard Gibson, and when the First World War forced the suspension of the English leagues, Ballantyne returned to Scotland, initially with Vale of Leven. Towards the end of the 1915–16 season, he joined Rangers, for whom he played one game in the Scottish Football League Division One, in a 1–1 draw at St Mirren on 17 April 1916. He then returned to Vale of Leven, and joined Dumfries in 1918.
