= David Morris (English footballer) =

English footballer

Personal information
- Date of birth: 1888
- Place of birth: Walsall, England
- Date of death: Unknown
- Position: Inside left

Senior career*
Years	Team	Apps	(Gls)
- Walsall Conduits
- Darlaston
1910–1912	Birmingham	3	(0)
1912–19??	Tipton Town		
- * Club domestic league appearances and goals

David J. Morris (1888 – after 1911) was an English professional footballer who played in the Football League for Birmingham. Born in Walsall, Staffordshire, Morris joined Birmingham in 1910, and made his debut in the Second Division on 9 September 1911 in a 2–1 defeat at Fulham. Morris played on the losing side in the next two games, looked out of his depth, and returned to non-league football in 1912.
