= George Davies (footballer, born 1900) =

English footballer

Personal information
- Date of birth: February 1900
- Place of birth: Wellington, Shropshire, England
- Date of death: November 1942 (aged 42)
- Height: 5 ft 5 in (1.65 m)
- Position: Outside left

Senior career*
Years	Team	Apps	(Gls)
- Wellington St George's
- Ironbridge
1918–1922	Birmingham	29	(7)
1922	Wellington Town		
1922–1924	Southend United	63	(11)
1924–19??	Wellington Town		
- * Club domestic league appearances and goals

George Davies (February 1900 – November 1942) was an English professional footballer who scored 18 goals in 92 appearances in the Football League playing for Birmingham and Southend United.

Davies was born in Wellington, Shropshire. He played football for Wellington St George's and Ironbridge and made guest appearances for Wrexham during the First World War, before joining Birmingham of the Football League Second Division in 1918; he was recommended to the club by Birmingham player Jack Elkes, who came from the same area. He made his debut in a 2–0 win at Wolverhampton Wanderers on 15 November 1919, and played regularly in the second half on that season. The following season, he lost his place to Ted Linley, but returned for the last eight games of the 1920–21 season to score five goals and help the club to the Second Division title. Davies played only three games in the First Division, and had a brief spell with Wellington Town before signing for Southend United of the Third Division South in June 1922. After 13 goals from 70 games in all competitions for Southend, Davies returned to Wellington Town at the end of the 1923–24 season. In June 1934 he was appointed to the club's committee.
