= Tom Pointon =

English footballer

Personal information
- Full name: Thomas Seth Pointon
- Date of birth: 1890
- Place of birth: Coventry, England
- Date of death: Unknown
- Position: Outside left

Senior career*
Years	Team	Apps	(Gls)
	Coventry City	0	(0)
- Redditch Town
1913–1914	Birmingham	4	(1)
1914	Redditch Town		
1914–1919	Walsall		
1919–1920	Nuneaton Town		
1920–192?	Coventry City	2	(0)
–	Redditch Town		
1925–19??	Tamworth Castle		
- * Club domestic league appearances and goals

Thomas Seth Pointon (1890 – after 1924) was an English footballer who played in the Football League for Birmingham and Coventry City.

Pointon was born in Evesham, Worcestershire. He began his football career as an amateur with Coventry City and Redditch Town before joining Birmingham, still as an amateur, in August 1913. The club were fined £5 for playing him in the reserves before the transfer formalities had been completed. An outside left, his performances in the reserves were such that he was invited to a trial for England's amateur team, which proved unsuccessful. He made his debut in the Second Division on New Year's Day 1914 in a 2–0 defeat at Stockport County, and played three times more that season, scoring once, but left in April 1914. He played briefly for Redditch, then joined Walsall shortly before the First World War started. After the war he had a season with Nuneaton Town before returning to the Football League with Coventry City. He played twice in the Second Division for Coventry before a third spell with Redditch and finishing his career at Tamworth Castle.
