= Bobby Booth =

English footballer

Personal information
- Full name: Robert Booth
- Date of birth: 20 December 1890
- Place of birth: West Hartlepool, County Durham, England
- Height: 5 ft 8 in (1.73 m)
- Position: Wing half

Senior career*
Years	Team	Apps	(Gls)
- Spennymoor United
1912–1920	Blackpool	96	(5)
1920–1922	Birmingham	8	(1)
1922–1923	Southend United	28	(1)
1923–1925	Swansea Town	36	(4)
1925	Merthyr Town	15	(1)
1925–1926	New Brighton	12	(1)
- * Club domestic league appearances and goals

Robert Booth (20 December 1890 – after 1925) was an English professional footballer who made nearly 200 appearances in the Football League playing for Blackpool, Birmingham, Southend United, Swansea Town, Merthyr Town and New Brighton. He played as a wing half.

Booth was born in West Hartlepool, County Durham. He began his football career with Spennymoor United before joining Second Division club Blackpool in May 1912. In three seasons before the First World War and one season after, Booth played 96 Football League games before moving to Birmingham in May 1920. Described as a "very quiet hard worker who never becomes ruffled", he played six times in his first season, at the end of which the club were promoted. Booth played twice in the First Division, but was allowed to leave at the end of the season. He embarked on a tour of the Third Divisions, spending short spells with Southend United, Swansea Town, Merthyr Town and New Brighton.
