= Thomas Jones (footballer, born 1885) =

English footballer

Personal information
- Full name: Thomas Jones
- Date of birth: 1885
- Place of birth: Prescot, England
- Date of death: Unknown
- Position: Forward

Senior career*
Years	Team	Apps	(Gls)
–1905	Bootle		
1905–1910	Everton	15	(5)
1910–1912	Birmingham	31	(12)
1912–19??	Southport Central		
- * Club domestic league appearances and goals

Thomas Jones (1885 – after 1912) was an English professional footballer who made 46 appearances in the Football League playing for Everton and Birmingham. He played as a forward.

Jones was born in Prescot, Lancashire. He began his football career with Bootle before joining Everton of the Football League First Division in 1905. He scored on his Everton debut, on 14 April 1906 in a 2–1 defeat of Derby County, but found his progress blocked by the prolific Sandy Young, and over the next four years Jones played only 14 more league games. He dropped down a division to join Birmingham in September 1910. He made a promising start to his first season with the club, and when Jack Hall arrived in December the pair formed a fine understanding. Injury disrupted Jones's 1911–12 season, in which he played only three times for the first team, and in 1912 he returned to Lancashire to join Southport Central.
