= Sid Webb =

English footballer

Personal information
- Full name: Sidney Webb
- Date of birth: February 1884
- Place of birth: Coventry, England
- Date of death: 1956 (aged 71–72)
- Place of death: Leamington, England
- Position: Inside forward

Senior career*
Years	Team	Apps	(Gls)
- St Saviour's
1903 -- 1904	Stourbridge	24	(12)
1908–1909	Aston Villa	0	(0)
- Burton United
- Wednesbury Old Athletic
1911–1912	Birmingham	3	(0)
1912–1914	Worcester City		(12)
- * Club domestic league appearances and goals

Sidney Webb (February 1884 – 1956) was an English professional footballer who played in the Football League for Birmingham. He played as an inside forward.

Webb was born in Coventry. He gained a good reputation playing in the Birmingham & District League for Stourbridge, Burton United, and Wednesbury Old Athletic, and spent a season with Aston Villa, though never progressed beyond the reserves. In April 1911 Webb, described as a "rotund little schemer", joined Second Division club Birmingham. He made his debut on the opening day of the 1911–12 season, in a 3–2 home defeat against Bradford Park Avenue, and kept his place for the next two games, but that was the extent of his career in the Football League. Webb then returned to the Birmingham League with Worcester City, where he scored 12 goals in the next two seasons.

Webb died in Leamington, Warwickshire, in 1956.
