= Charles Sprigg =

English footballer

Personal information
- Date of birth: 1889
- Place of birth: Smethwick, England
- Date of death: 1969 (aged 79)
- Place of death: Birmingham, England
- Height: 5 ft 7 1/2 in (1.71 m)
- Position: Outside left

Senior career*
Years	Team	Apps	(Gls)
- Smethwick Centaur
- Bilston United
1912–1913	Birmingham	5	(0)
1913–1914	Redditch Town		
1914–1915	Birmingham	9	(0)
1915–19??	Moor Green		
- * Club domestic league appearances and goals

Charles Sprigg (Note: Joyce calls him Spriggs (with a final "s"), as opposed to Matthews' Sprigg (without). The Matthews version is consistent with contemporary newspaper match reports and with the register of births.) (1889–1969) was an English professional footballer who played in the Football League for Birmingham. He played as an outside left.

Sprigg was born in Smethwick, which was then in Staffordshire. He played local football before joining Birmingham in November 1912. He made his debut in the Second Division on 28 December 1912, in a home game against Bradford which finished as a 1–1 draw. He played in the next four games, and then left the club, only to return in 1914 having spent the intervening period playing for Redditch Town. He played nine more games before the First World War put a stop to the Football League. In 1915 he enlisted in the Royal Field Artillery.

Sprigg died in Birmingham in 1969 at the age of 79.
