= Jack Hall (footballer, born 1883) =

English footballer (1883–1949)

Personal information
- Full name: John Henry Hall
- Date of birth: 3 July 1883
- Place of birth: Hucknall, England
- Date of death: 20 February 1949 (aged 65)
- Place of death: Birmingham, England
- Height: 5 ft 9 1/2 in (1.77 m)
- Positions: Inside forward; centre forward

Senior career*
Years	Team	Apps	(Gls)
–	Newark		
1904–1906	Stoke	53	(18)
1906–1908	Brighton & Hove Albion	83	(49)
1908–1910	Middlesbrough	59	(30)
1910	Leicester Fosse	15	(5)
1910–1915	Birmingham	97	(47)
1915–1918	Hucknall Town		
- * Club domestic league appearances and goals

John Henry Hall (3 July 1883 – 20 February 1949) was an English professional footballer who played more than 200 games in the Football League as an inside forward or centre forward.

== Career ==
Hall was born in Hucknall, Nottinghamshire. After trials with Nottingham Forest and Mansfield Town, he turned professional with Stoke in October 1904. He played more than 50 games in the Football League, scoring 18 goals before joining Brighton & Hove Albion in 1906. He was their leading scorer in the two seasons he spent with the club, with 28 and 26 goals respectively in all competitions. In all domestic league competitions, he scored 38 goals from 67 games in the Southern League, 6 from 9 in the United League, and 5 from 7 in the Western League.

In April 1908, Hall signed for Middlesbrough for a £700 fee. At the time, there was a £350 cap on transfer fees, so clubs evaded the problem by including a second player as a makeweight in the deal, valuing him at the difference between £350 and the fee required. The makeweight in this case was Harry Kent, a centre-half who played only six times for Middlesbrough before returning to the Southern League with Watford. Middlesbrough were nevertheless fined £100 over the transaction, as Hall's Football League registration was still held by Stoke. Hall was Middlesbrough's top scorer in both the seasons with that club, in 1908–09 and 1909–10.

After a brief spell with Leicester Fosse he moved to Birmingham, where he was yet again his club's leading scorer in his first two seasons, 1910–11 (despite not joining the club until December 1910) and 1911–12. After retiring from football, Hall became the landlord of The Small Heath Tavern in Birmingham, where he remained until his death in 1949.

== Career statistics ==
Appearances and goals by club, season and competition
Club	Season	League			FA Cup		Total	
Club	Season	Division	Apps	Goals	Apps	Goals	Apps	Goals
Stoke	1904–05	First Division	25	7	0	0	25	7
Stoke	1905–06	First Division	28	11	2	0	30	11
Stoke	Total		53	18	2	0	55	18
Brighton & Hove Albion	1906–07	Southern League						
Brighton & Hove Albion	1907–08	Southern League						
Brighton & Hove Albion	Total		83	49			86	49
Middlesbrough	1908–09	First Division	30	18	1	0	31	18
Middlesbrough	1909–10	First Division	29	12	2	0	31	12
Middlesbrough	Total		59	30	3	0	62	30
Leicester Fosse	1910–11	Second Division	15	5	0	0	15	5
Birmingham	1910–11	Second Division	19	13	2	1	21	14
Birmingham	1911–12	Second Division	35	21	2	0	37	21
Birmingham	1912–13	Second Division	22	8	1	0	23	8
Birmingham	1913–14	Second Division	17	5	1	0	18	5
Birmingham	1914–15	Second Division	4	0	0	0	4	0
Birmingham	Total		97	47	6	1	103	48
Career total			307	149	11	1	320	150
