= Jimmy Daws =

English footballer

Personal information
- Full name: James Daws
- Date of birth: 27 May 1898
- Place of birth: Mansfield Woodhouse, England
- Date of death: June 1985 (aged 87)
- Place of death: Birmingham, England
- Height: 5 ft 9 in (1.75 m)
- Position: Right half

Senior career*
Years	Team	Apps	(Gls)
1919	Notts County	0	(0)
1919–1920	Mansfield Town		
1920–1924	Birmingham	46	(1)
1924–1925	Bristol Rovers	29	(0)
1925	Mansfield Woodhouse		
1925–1927	Poole Town		
- * Club domestic league appearances and goals

James Daws (27 May 1898 – June 1985) was an English professional footballer who played as a right half. He played 75 games in the Football League for Birmingham and Bristol Rovers.

== Life and career ==
Born in Mansfield Woodhouse, Nottinghamshire, Daws began his football career with brief spells as an amateur with Notts County and Mansfield Town, before joining Birmingham in January 1920. In four years with the club he played nearly 50 games, but failed to establish himself as a first-team regular. He moved on to Bristol Rovers, initially as an amateur, then after a couple of months the club paid £250 for his services as a professional player. After one season in Bristol, he returned home for a year, playing for Mansfield Woodhouse F.C., before finishing his career with two seasons as player-trainer of Poole Town. He contributed to the club winning the Western League Division Two in the 1925–26 season, reaching the third round proper of the 1926–27 FA Cup, in which they lost 3–1 to First Division club Everton, and winning the Dorset Senior Cup in both seasons.

He died in Birmingham at the age of 87.
