= Stan Hauser =

English footballer

Personal information
- Full name: Stanley Hauser
- Date of birth: 20 July 1890
- Place of birth: Handsworth, Sheffield, England
- Date of death: 10 June 1958 (aged 67)
- Place of death: Handsworth, Birmingham, England
- Height: 5 ft 11 1/2 in (1.82 m)
- Position: Goalkeeper

Senior career*
Years	Team	Apps	(Gls)
- Stockton
- Handsworth Oakhill
1913–1922	Small Heath	31	(0)
- Stourbridge
- Shrewsbury Town
- Netherton
- Cradley Heath St Luke's

International career
1914	England (amateur)	2	(0)
- * Club domestic league appearances and goals

Stanley Hauser (20 July 1890 – 10 June 1958) was an English footballer who made 31 appearances in the Football League playing for Birmingham as a goalkeeper. He appeared twice for England's amateur representative team.

Hauser was born in Handsworth, South Yorkshire, now part of Sheffield. He worked in his family's shop, and played football in Birmingham's Early Closers League before joining Second Division club Birmingham in November 1913. Hauser made his debut on 27 December in a 5–1 defeat at Bradford, but kept his place for the rest of the 1913–14 season. William Robb remained ever-present in goal the following season, and Dan Tremelling did the same in the first season after the First World War, but Hauser deputised for Tremelling in a run of games in the latter part of the 1920–21 season, at the end of which Birmingham won the Second Division title. He played three times in the First Division before leaving to join Stourbridge in December 1922. He later played for Shrewsbury Town, Netherton and Cradley Heath St Luke's.

Hauser never turned professional. In 1914 he was capped twice for the England amateur team, playing in an 8–1 victory in Brussels against the Belgium national team and a 3–0 defeat to the Denmark national side in Copenhagen.

He died in Handsworth, Birmingham, in 1958 at the age of 67.
