= Billy Walker (Scottish footballer) =

Scottish footballer and manager

Personal information
- Full name: William Baird Walker
- Date of birth: 5 May 1893
- Place of birth: New Cumnock, Scotland
- Height: 5 ft 7 1/2 in (1.71 m)
- Position: Forward

Senior career*
| Years | Team | Apps | (Gls) |
- New Cumnock
- Lugar Boswell
| 1911–1913 | Bradford City | 5 | (0) |
| 1913 | Lanemark | | |
| 1913–1919 | Birmingham | 28 | (10) |
| 1919–1920 | Coventry City | 20 | (7) |
| 1920–1922 | Merthyr Town | 80 | (24) |
| 1922–1923 | Bristol City | 37 | (7) |
| 1923–1924 | Sheffield Wednesday | 18 | (6) |
| 1924–1925 | Weymouth | | |
| 1925–19?? | Leamington Town | | |
- Redditch Town

Managerial career
- 1924–1925: Weymouth (player-manager)
- * Club domestic league appearances and goals

William Baird Walker (5 May 1893 – after 1925) was a Scottish professional footballer who scored 53 goals in 188 appearances in the Football League playing for Bradford City, Birmingham, Coventry City, Merthyr Town, Bristol City and Sheffield Wednesday.

Walker was born in New Cumnock, Ayrshire. A forward, he began his football career with New Cumnock and Lugar Boswell before coming to England to join Football League First Division club and FA Cup-holders Bradford City in August 1911. He remained at the club for 18 months, playing only five league games in that time, before returning to Scotland in March 1913 suffering from homesickness. A few months later he ventured south again, signing for Birmingham of the Second Division. He scored on his debut in a 2–2 draw at Blackpool, and finished the 1913–14 season with eight goals from 12 league appearances. He played only rarely for the first team the following season, but scored six hat-tricks for the reserves.

Walker returned to the club towards the end of the First World War, scoring 15 goals in 29 games in the last season of the wartime leagues, and kept his place at the beginning of the 1919–20 Football League season, moving on to Coventry City, newly elected to the Second Division, in November 1919. The following year he dropped down a division to join Merthyr Town, founder members of the inaugural season of the Third Division South, for whom he scored 24 goals in 80 league games. From October 1922 Walker spent a year with Bristol City, scoring 8 goals in 39 appearances in all competitions, before finishing off his Football League career at Sheffield Wednesday, where in what remained of the 1923–24 season he scored 5 goals in 19 games.

He spent the 1924–25 season as player-manager of Weymouth, whom he led to sixth place in the Southern League Western Division and runners-up spot in the Western League, and ended his playing career with Leamington Town and Redditch Town.
