= Andy Smith (footballer, born 1890) =

English footballer

Personal information
- Full name: Andrew Walter Smith
- Date of birth: April 1890
- Place of birth: London, England
- Date of death: April 1968 (aged 77–78)
- Height: 5 ft 9 in (1.75 m)
- Position: Centre forward

Youth career
- Langley Green Juniors

Senior career*
Years	Team	Apps	(Gls)
- Crosswell's Brewery
1912–1919	Birmingham	54	(33)
1919–1923	West Bromwich Albion	79	(20)
1923	Stoke	5	(0)
1923	Wigan Borough	3	(1)
–	Bournemouth & Boscombe Athletic	0	(0)
Total		141	(54)
- * Club domestic league appearances and goals

Andrew Walter Smith (April 1890 – 1968) was an English professional footballer who played as a centre forward or inside right. He scored 54 goals from 141 appearances in the Football League.

== Career ==
Smith was born in Camberwell, London. He joined Birmingham as an amateur in 1912 and turned professional two years later. Before the First World War interrupted his career, he played two full seasons and was Birmingham's leading goalscorer in each. He made guest appearances for Manchester City during the war. Before League football resumed post-war he moved to West Bromwich Albion for a fee of £100, and helped them to their first (and as of 2016 only) League championship. He scored both goals in the 1920 FA Charity Shield victory against Second Division champions Tottenham Hotspur. In 1923 he moved to Stoke, followed by Wigan Borough and Bournemouth & Boscombe Athletic, but hardly played.

== Career statistics ==
Club	Season	League			FA Cup		Charity Shield		Total	
Club	Season	Division	Apps	Goals	Apps	Goals	Apps	Goals	Apps	Goals
Birmingham	1912–13	Second Division	6	2	0	0	0	0	6	2
Birmingham	1913–14	Second Division	18	10	0	0	0	0	18	10
Birmingham	1914–15	Second Division	30	21	5	3	0	0	35	24
Birmingham	Total		54	33	5	3	0	0	59	36
West Bromwich Albion	1919–20	First Division	29	7	0	0	0	0	29	7
West Bromwich Albion	1920–21	First Division	28	7	1	0	1	2	30	9
West Bromwich Albion	1921–22	First Division	19	5	0	0	0	0	19	5
West Bromwich Albion	1922–23	First Division	3	1	0	0	0	0	3	1
West Bromwich Albion	Total		79	20	1	0	1	2	81	22
Stoke	1922–23	First Division	2	0	0	0	0	0	2	0
Stoke	1923–24	First Division	3	0	0	0	0	0	3	0
Stoke	Total		5	0	0	0	0	0	5	0
Wigan Borough	1923–24	Third Division North	3	1	0	0	0	0	3	1
Career total			141	54	6	3	1	2	148	59

== Honours ==
- with Birmingham
  - club's top scorer: 1913–14, 1914–15
- with West Bromwich Albion
  - Football League First Division champions: 1919–20
  - FA Charity Shield winners: 1920
