= Laurie Burkinshaw =

English footballer

Personal information
- Full name: Laurence Burkinshaw
- Date of birth: 2 December 1891
- Place of birth: Kilnhurst, England
- Date of death: 1969 (aged 77–78)
- Place of death: Mexborough, England
- Height: 5 ft 8 in (1.73 m)
- Position: Outside right

Youth career
- Mexborough Town

Senior career*
Years	Team	Apps	(Gls)
1910–1914	Sheffield Wednesday	23	(6)
1914–19??	Rotherham Town		
–	Kilnhurst		
1919–1922	Birmingham	71	(11)
1922–1923	Halifax Town	26	(2)
1923–19??	Mexborough Town		
- * Club domestic league appearances and goals

Laurence Burkinshaw (2 December 1891 – 1969) was an English professional footballer born in Kilnhurst, Yorkshire, who played as an outside right. He made 120 appearances in the Football League, playing for Sheffield Wednesday, Birmingham and Halifax Town.
