= William Robb (footballer, born 1895) =

Scottish footballer

Personal information
- Date of birth: 20 March 1895
- Place of birth: Rutherglen, Scotland
- Date of death: 18 February 1976 (aged 80)
- Place of death: Aldershot, England
- Height: 5 ft 11 3/4 in (1.82 m)
- Position: Goalkeeper

Youth career
- Eastern Burnside

Senior career*
Years	Team	Apps	(Gls)
- Kirkintilloch Rob Roy
1914–1915	Birmingham	40	(0)
1915–1917	Vale of Leven		
1916	→ Royal Albert (loan)		
1917–1920	Third Lanark	43	(0)
1919–1920	→ Armadale (loan)		
1920–1926	Rangers	227	(0)
1926–1930	Hibernian	130	(0)
1930–1937	Aldershot		
1937–1939	Guildford City		
Total		440	(0)

International career
1918	Scotland (wartime)	1	(0)
1921–1924	Scottish League XI	2	(0)
1925–1927	Scotland	2	(0)
- * Club domestic league appearances and goals

William R. Robb (20 March 1895 – 18 February 1976) was a Scottish footballer who played as a goalkeeper. He played in the English Football League for Birmingham and Aldershot, and in the Scottish League for Third Lanark, Rangers and Hibernian. He won two full caps for the Scotland national team.

== Career ==
=== Club ===
Robb was born in Rutherglen, South Lanarkshire, and as a teenager played for clubs including juniors Kirkintilloch Rob Roy before moving to England, where he turned professional with Second Division club Birmingham. He made his debut in a 3–1 defeat at Bury on 24 February 1914 while still only 18, and played in every match of Birmingham's 1914–15 season. He returned to Scotland when English football was suspended for the First World War and played for a variety of clubs, including two seasons with Third Lanark.

Robb was signed to Rangers by Bill Struth in 1920 and stayed there for six years, making 251 appearances. He made his debut against Ayr United on 13 April 1920, starting in a 2–1 win for Rangers. From the end of the 1919–20 season until midway into the 1925–26 season, Robb played in every league and Scottish Cup match that Rangers were involved in; this run came to an end on 31 October 1925, after 241 consecutive matches.

Robb left Ibrox in 1926 to move to Hibernian. He won a second Scotland cap with Hibs and made 137 appearances, but lost his place in the team in 1930 after dislocating a finger.

Returning to England, Robb joined Southern League champions Aldershot Town. He contributed to their gaining election to the Football League in 1932, and played 177 matches for them in that league, before playing two seasons for Guildford City, whom he helped win the championship of the Southern League. He retired in 1939 at the age of 44.

=== International ===
Robb gained two Scotland caps during his career, both coming against Wales, in 1925 and 1927. He made his debut on 31 October 1925 and kept a clean sheet in a 3–0 win at Ninian Park, Cardiff. He was also capped twice for the Scottish League representative side.

== Honours ==
Rangers

- Scottish Football League: 1920–21, 1922–23, 1923–24, 1924–25
- Scottish Cup runner-up: 1920–21, 1921–22

Guildford City

- Southern League champions: 1937–38
  - Runners-up: 1938–39
