= Charlie Millington =

English footballer

Personal information
- Full name: Charles Millington
- Date of birth: 25 April 1882
- Place of birth: Lincoln, England
- Date of death: 22 June 1945 (aged 63)
- Place of death: Wellington, England
- Position: Outside right

Senior career*
Years	Team	Apps	(Gls)
1901–1902	Midland Athletic		
1902–1903	Newark Avenue		
1903–1905	Grantham	35	(10)
1905	Ripley Athletic	57	(18)
1905–1907	Aston Villa	83	(13)
1907–1909	Fulham		
1909–1912	Birmingham		
1912–1913	Wellington Town		
1913–1914	Brierley Hill Alliance		
1914–19??	Stourbridge		
- Oakengates Town
- * Club domestic league appearances and goals

Charles Millington (25 April 1882 – 22 June 1945) was an English professional footballer who played for Aston Villa, Fulham and Birmingham in the Football League. He played mainly as an outside right, and was noted for his pace.
