= Arthur Smith (footballer, born 1887) =

English footballer (1887–after 1914)

Personal information
- Date of birth: 1887
- Place of birth: Stourbridge, England
- Date of death: Unknown
- Height: 5 ft 6 in (1.68 m)
- Position: Outside left

Senior career*
Years	Team	Apps	(Gls)
- Brierley Hill Alliance
1911–1912	Queens Park Rangers	35	(8)
1912–1914	Birmingham	51	(3)
1914–19??	Brierley Hill Alliance		
- * Club domestic league appearances and goals

Arthur R. Smith (1887 – after 1914) was an English professional footballer who played as an outside left for Birmingham in the Football League. Born in Stourbridge, Worcestershire, Smith combined football with a career as a schoolteacher. Popularly known as "Nipper", he was renowned for his pace and for his ability to cross the ball early.
