= Ernie Edwards (footballer) =

English footballer

Personal information
- Full name: Ernest Arthur Edwards
- Date of birth: 17 February 1892
- Place of birth: Stourbridge, England
- Place of death: Kidderminster, England
- Height: 5 ft 9 in (1.75 m)
- Position: Half back

Senior career*
| Years | Team | Apps | (Gls) |
- Old Hill Unity
| | West Bromwich Albion | 0 | (0) |
| – | Kidderminster Olympic | | |
| 1911–1913 | Redditch Town | | |
| 1913–1919 | Birmingham | 17 | (0) |
| 1919 | Tipton Excelsior | | |
| 1919 | Merthyr Town | | |
| 1919–1923 | Newport County (Note: Appearances and goals for Newport County include only the Football League years.) | 113 | (0) |
| 1923–1926 | Southend United | 92 | (4) |
| 1926–19?? | Dudley Town | | |
| – | Merthyr Town | 0 | (0) |
- * Club domestic league appearances and goals

Ernest Arthur Edwards (17 February 1892 – after 1931) was an English professional footballer who made 222 appearances in the Football League playing for Birmingham, Newport County and Southend United. He played as a half back.

Edwards was born in Stourbridge, Worcestershire. He began his football career with clubs in and around the Black Country before joining Football League Second Division club Birmingham in April 1913. He made his debut on 3 September 1913, in a 3–2 win at home to Stockport County, the first of a run of games at the start of that season, but played only rarely after that before the First World War put an end to League football. Edwards played as a guest for Newport County in the wartime leagues, and after the war returned to the club where he played more than 100 games in the Third Division South. In the 1927 close season Edwards joined Southend United, where he played nearly 100 games in all competitions, and went on to play for Dudley Town and Merthyr Town before retiring from the game in 1932.
