= Arthur Reed (footballer, born 1894) =

English footballer

Personal information
- Full name: Arthur Reed
- Date of birth: 1894
- Place of birth: Sheffield, England
- Date of death: Unknown
- Height: 5 ft 5 in (1.65 m)
- Position: Forward

Senior career*
Years	Team	Apps	(Gls)
- Leadmill St Mary's
19??–1912	Doncaster Rovers	0	(0)
1912–1917	Birmingham	28	(12)
- * Club domestic league appearances and goals

Arthur Reed (1894 – after 1916) was an English professional footballer who scored 12 goals in 28 appearances in the Football League playing as a forward for Birmingham.

Reed was born in Sheffield. A short man of less than athletic physique, he began playing for Leadmill St Mary's and, very briefly, as an 18-year-old, for Doncaster Rovers in March 1912. He had been on the teamsheet for Doncaster reserves as "S.O. Else" and managed a hat-trick in what was his first game. The following Saturday he played for the first team in the Sheffield and Hallamshire Senior Cup final, because one of the Rovers forwards was injured and another ineligible. He scored two goals in a 3−1 victory and was carried off the field by the Rovers supporters. However, because he had not been officially transferred from Leadmill, Doncaster were fined 10 shillings.

Within a couple of weeks, he had joined Birmingham of the Football League Second Division. He made his debut on 6 April 1912, scoring twice in a 4–0 win at home to Burnley. Over the next three seasons Reed played only intermittently, apart from a run of nine consecutive games at the end of the 1912–13 season in which he scored six goals, and he retired through injury in 1917.
