= Joe Roulson =

English footballer

Personal information
- Full name: Joseph Roulson
- Date of birth: 7 October 1891
- Place of birth: Sheffield, England
- Date of death: 1952 (aged 60–61)
- Place of death: Sheffield, England
- Height: 5 ft 8 1/2 in (1.74 m)
- Position: Wing half

Senior career*
Years	Team	Apps	(Gls)
1910–1912	Cammell Laird (Sheffield)		
1912–1923	Birmingham	116	(4)
1923–1924	Swansea Town	49	(2)
1924–1925	Clapton Orient	16	(0)
- * Club domestic league appearances and goals

Joseph Roulson (7 October 1891 – 1952) was an English professional footballer who played as a right half. He played for Birmingham both before and after the First World War, making 125 appearances in all competitions, and helped them win the championship of the Football League Second Division in 1920–21.

Roulson, a native of Sheffield, became a steelworker, and signed for Birmingham from his works team, Cammell Laird of the Sheffield Works League. He was a competitive, "hard-man" type of half-back, similar to his teammate Percy Barton. After leaving Birmingham he played for Swansea Town and Clapton Orient and then returned to Sheffield. He died in 1952, aged about 60.
