= Frank Hodges (footballer) =

English footballer

Personal information
- Full name: Frank Charles Hodges
- Date of birth: 20 January 1891
- Place of birth: Birmingham, England
- Date of death: 5 June 1985 (aged 94)
- Place of death: Southport, England
- Height: 5 ft 8 in (1.73 m)
- Position: Outside right

Senior career*
Years	Team	Apps	(Gls)
1911–1919	Birmingham	27	(4)
1919	St Mirren (guest)	4	(1)
1919–1921	Manchester United	20	(4)
1921–1922	Wigan Borough	33	(5)
1922–1925	Crewe Alexandra	22	(1)
1925	Stalybridge Celtic		
1925	Manchester North End		
1925–1926	Sandbach Ramblers		
–	Middlewich		
- * Club domestic league appearances and goals

Frank Charles Hodges (26 January 1891 – 5 June 1985) was an English footballer. His regular position was as a forward. He was born in Nechells, Birmingham. He played League football for Birmingham, Manchester United, Wigan Borough and Crewe Alexandra, and also made wartime guest appearances for St Mirren.
