= George Robertson (footballer, born 1883) =

Scottish footballer

Personal information
- Full name: George Robertson
- Date of birth: 1883
- Place of birth: Glasgow, Scotland
- Date of death: Unknown
- Height: 5 ft 8 1/2 in (1.74 m)
- Positions: Left half; inside forward

Senior career*
Years	Team	Apps	(Gls)
–1901	Rutherglen Glencairn		
1901–1902	Clyde	24	(0)
1902	→ Rangers (loan)	0	(0)
1902–1903	Blackburn Rovers	10	(1)
1903–1910	Clyde	181	(4)
1910–1914	Birmingham	84	(17)
1914	Bloxwich Strollers		
1921–19??	Brierley Hill Alliance		
- * Club domestic league appearances and goals

George Robertson (1883 – after 1921) was a Scottish professional footballer who played for Clyde in the Scottish Football League and for Blackburn Rovers and Birmingham in the English Football League.

Born in Glasgow, Robertson started his career with local club Clyde as a left half. He moved to England with Blackburn Rovers in 1902, where he was used in a more attacking role. Returning to Clyde the following year, he spent another seven years with the club, and appeared in the 1910 Scottish Cup Final which Clyde lost to Dundee in a second replay. In 1910 he joined Birmingham, where he spent four years before moving into non-league football with Bloxwich Strollers. After serving in the First World War, he played for Brierley Hill Alliance.
