= Alf Tinkler =

English footballer (1886–1950)

Personal information
- Full name: Alfred Tinkler
- Date of birth: 22 August 1886
- Place of birth: Manchester, England
- Date of death: 2 April 1950 (aged 63)
- Place of death: Balham, London, England
- Height: 5 ft 9 3/4 in (1.77 m)
- Position: Centre half

Senior career*
Years	Team	Apps	(Gls)
1907–1909	Ilkeston United		
1909–1910	Derby County	2	(0)
- Heanor United
1911	Ilkeston United		(4)
1911–1915	Birmingham	97	(3)
1915–1917	Burton United	0	(0)
- * Club domestic league appearances and goals

Alfred Tinkler (22 August 1886 – 2 April 1950) was an English professional footballer who played as a centre half in the Football League for Derby County and Birmingham.

Tinkler was born in Manchester in 1886. He played football for Ilkeston United before joining Derby County in 1909, but made only two League appearances before returning to non-league football with Heanor United and a second spell at Ilkeston. Between 1911 and 1915 when competitive football was postponed for the duration of the First World War, Tinkler made more than 100 appearances in all competitions for Second Division club Birmingham.

Tinkler later resided in Wallington, Surrey. He died at St James' Hospital, Balham, in 1950 at the age of 63.
