= Percy Barton =

English footballer (1893–1961)

Personal information
- Date of birth: 20 January 1893
- Place of birth: Edmonton, London, England
- Date of death: October 1961 (aged 68)
- Place of death: Birmingham, England
- Height: 5 ft 8 in (1.73 m)
- Position: Left half

Youth career
- Tottenham Thursday

Senior career*
Years	Team	Apps	(Gls)
- Edmonton Amateurs
- Sultan
1914–1929	Birmingham	331	(13)
1929–1933	Stourbridge		

International career
1921–1924	England	7	(0)
- * Club domestic league appearances and goals

Percy Barton (20 January 1893 – October 1961) was an England international footballer who played as a left half. He played for Birmingham both before and after the First World War, making 349 appearances in all competitions, and was a member of the team that won the Second Division title in 1920–21.

== Career ==
Barton was born in Edmonton, London where he attended Montague Road School. He worked as a butcher's boy on leaving school, and played football for a local team, Sultan F.C. One of his Sultan teammates, Richard Gibson, had gone on to play professionally for Birmingham, and Gibson recommended Barton to the club. Barton signed for Birmingham in January 1914 at the age of 18, went straight into the first team, and missed only two league games in a season and a half before the Football League was suspended for the duration of the war.

He missed only one match in the 1920–21 season as Birmingham won the Second Division title. Towards the end of his Birmingham career he played in positions other than his customary left-half; in the 1926–27 season he was used at left back and later still he played centre-half or filled in occasionally on the right. He was a hard-working player, whose combative style did not always find favour with referees, resulting in him being sent off three times. After leaving Birmingham he spent four seasons with Stourbridge in the Birmingham & District League.

He won seven caps for England between 1921 and 1924.

Barton died in Birmingham in October 1961 at the age of 68.
