= Bill Hastings (footballer) =

English footballer (1888–c.1919)

Personal information
- Full name: William Hastings
- Date of birth: 22 August 1888
- Place of birth: West Hartlepool, England
- Height: 5 ft 6 1/2 in (1.69 m)
- Position: Outside left

Senior career*
Years	Team	Apps	(Gls)
- Spennymoor United
- West Hartlepool
1909–1912	Brighton & Hove Albion	85	(11)
1912–1914	Birmingham	40	(7)
1914–1919	Watford	34	(6)
1919	Hartlepools United	0	(0)
- * Club domestic league appearances and goals

William Hastings (22 August 1888 – after 1919) was an English professional footballer who scored seven goals in 40 appearances in the Second Division of the Football League playing for Birmingham. He also won the Southern League title with Brighton & Hove Albion in the 1909–10 season and with Watford in 1914–15. His main playing position was at outside left.

Hastings was born in West Hartlepool, County Durham, and played for Spennymoor United and West Hartlepool before moving south to join Brighton & Hove Albion in the summer of 1909. He missed only one game as the club won the Southern League title and the Southern Charity Cup in his first season, and set up Charlie Webb's goal as Albion beat reigning Football League champions Aston Villa in the 1910 FA Charity Shield. He moved to Second Division club Birmingham in February 1912 for a £100 fee. He never established himself as a first-choice player, and moved back to the Southern League with Watford in 1914, with whom he again won that league's championship in the last season before the First World War. After serving in the Royal Flying Corps, Hastings returned home to play a few games for North Eastern League club Hartlepools United. He later became a referee.
