= Billy Morgan (footballer, born 1891) =

English footballer

Personal information
- Date of birth: 3 November 1891
- Place of birth: Old Hill, Cradley Heath, England
- Height: 5 ft 7 1/2 in (1.71 m)
- Positions: Outside left; inside left

Senior career*
Years	Team	Apps	(Gls)
- Cradley Heath St Luke's
1912–1920	Birmingham	60	(11)
1920–1922	Coventry City	53	(14)
1922–1925	Crystal Palace	76	(14)
1925–1927	Cradley Heath St Luke's		
1927–19??	Shrewsbury Town		

International career
1919	The Football League XI	1	(0)
- * Club domestic league appearances and goals

William Albert L. Morgan (3 November 1891 – after 1927) was an English professional footballer born in Old Hill, Cradley Heath, Staffordshire, who played either at outside left or inside left. He played for Birmingham, Coventry City and Crystal Palace in the Football League, and was capped once for a Football League representative side.

Morgan's appearance for the Football League XI came in February 1919 against the Scottish League at his home ground of St Andrew's, Birmingham, in the first representative match played after the First World War. He set up the second goal for Bob Whittingham in a 3–1 win, and according to the Daily Express reporter, "the pick" of the English XI were Morgan, Whittingham and Joe Clennell.
