= Richard Gibson (English footballer) =

English footballer

Personal information
- Full name: Richard Samuel Gibson
- Date of birth: February 1889
- Place of birth: London, England
- Date of death: After 1921
- Height: 5 ft 6 in (1.68 m)
- Position: Winger

Senior career*
Years	Team	Apps	(Gls)
19??–1911	Sultan		
1911–1921	Birmingham	110	(16)
1921–1922	Manchester United	11	(0)
- * Club domestic league appearances and goals

Richard Samuel Gibson (February 1889 – after 1921) was an English professional footballer who played as a winger. He made 120 appearances and scored 19 goals in all competitions for Birmingham over a ten-year career, and helped them win the championship of the Football League Second Division in 1920–21. He then moved to First Division Manchester United where he made 12 appearances without scoring; they were relegated that season.

Gibson was credited with recommending his former Sultan F.C. teammate Percy Barton to Birmingham.
