= William Ball (footballer) =

English footballer

Personal information
- Date of birth: 9 April 1886
- Place of birth: Woodside, Dudley, England
- Date of death: 30 September 1942 (aged 56)
- Height: 5 ft 7 in (1.70 m)
- Position: Full back

Youth career
- Dudley Welfare
- Stourbridge
- Leamington Town

Senior career*
Years	Team	Apps	(Gls)
1909–1911	Wellington Town		
1911–1921	Birmingham	152	(0)
1921–19??	Cannock Town		
19??–1924	Wellington Town		

International career
1919	England (Victory international)	1	(0)
- * Club domestic league appearances and goals

William Ball (9 April 1886 – 30 September 1942) was an English professional footballer who played as a full back. He was born in the Woodside area of Dudley, Worcestershire, and played for Birmingham both before and after the First World War. He made 165 appearances in all competitions and helped them win the Second Division championship in 1920–21. He played once for England in 1919, a Victory international against Wales in which he sustained an injury and was unable to complete the match.
