= Frank Womack =

English footballer and manager (1888–1968)

Personal information
- Full name: Francis Womack
- Date of birth: 16 September 1888
- Place of birth: Stannington, Sheffield, England
- Date of death: 8 October 1968 (aged 80)
- Place of death: Caistor, England
- Height: 5 ft 8 in (1.73 m)
- Position: Full back

Senior career*
Years	Team	Apps	(Gls)
1908–1928	Birmingham	491	(0)
1928–1929	Worcester City		
1929	Torquay United	19	(0)

Managerial career
- 1928–1930: Worcester City
- 1930–1932: Torquay United
- 1932–1936: Grimsby Town
- 1936–1939: Leicester City
- 1942–1943: Notts County
- 1945–1947: Oldham Athletic
- 1951: Grimsby Town
- * Club domestic league appearances and goals

Francis Womack (16 September 1888 – 8 October 1968) was an English association football player and manager born in Stannington, Sheffield, Yorkshire. He still holds the league appearances record for Birmingham City playing 491 games and holds the league record for most games (510) by an outfield player without scoring a goal. He died in Caistor, Lincolnshire, at the age of 80.

He Played from 1908-1929 510 games played and 0 Goals Scored .

== Playing career ==
Womack began his professional football career in July 1908 when he joined Birmingham from Rawmarsh Albion, having previously played for Lapham Street. He made his league debut in September 1908, away to Gainsborough Trinity. He spent nearly his entire playing career at Birmingham, never signing a contract, and was club captain for 16 years from 1912 to 1928.

During his time at the club, they twice finished in 3rd place in the Second Division (1913, 1920) and won the Second Division in 1921 and were still in the First Division when Womack left in May 1928 to join Worcester City as player-manager. In his first season with Worcester, Womack guided them to the Birmingham League title and to the first round of the FA Cup. He returned to League football at the end of the season, joining Torquay United, where he played a further 19 league games and 1 FA Cup appearance.

== Management ==
In July 1930 Womack took over from Albert Hoskins as manager of Torquay United. United finished 11th in Division Three (South) in his first season, but slumped to 19th the following season.

In May 1932, Womack was appointed as manager of Grimsby Town, just after their relegation from the First Division. While manager of Grimsby Town, Womack guided them to their great period of success, with promotion back to the First Division as champions, an all-time highest league placing of 5th in 1935 and a FA Cup semi final in 1936.

In October 1936, Womack moved to Leicester City as manager, then near the bottom of Division Two. He signed Jack Bowers from Derby County, and his goals (33 in 27 games) helped City to the title and promotion. He resigned following their relegation in May 1939. Just before the Second World War was declared, the local Leicester newspapers published articles that claimed that Womack had several thousand pounds available to spend on players. Womack disputed this and referred all enquirers to his board of directors. As a direct result, he resigned and moved to Fleetwood, Lancashire, in April 1940.

He returned to management in July 1942, taking over at Notts County, but left in November 1943. In February 1945 he took over at Oldham Athletic, but resigned in April 1947 after Oldham had struggled in the first post-war season.

Womack returned to Grimsby for a stint as 'guest' manager January in 1951 for five months whilst manager Charlie Spencer was recovering from an illness. He left in May 1951, after Grimsby's relegation.

== Honours ==
=== As player ===
Birmingham

- Second Division Champions: 1921

=== As manager ===
Grimsby Town

- Second Division Champions: 1934

Leicester City

- Second Division Champions: 1937
