= 1906–07 Birmingham F.C. season =

Birmingham F.C.
1906–07 season
- Chairman: Walter W. Hart
- Secretary-manager: Alf Jones
- Ground: Coventry Road until 22 December 1906; St Andrew's Ground from 26 December 1906
- Football League First Division: 9th
- FA Cup: First round (eliminated by Liverpool)
- Top goalscorer: League: Billy Jones (15); All: Billy Jones (15)
- Highest home attendance: 60,000 vs Aston Villa, 19 January 1907
- Lowest home attendance: 6,000 vs Bury, 22 December 1906
- Average home league attendance: 16,684
Team colours

The 1906–07 Football League season was Birmingham Football Club's 15th in the Football League and their 7th in the First Division. They finished in ninth place in the 20-team league. They also took part in the 1906–07 FA Cup, entering at the first round proper and losing in that round to Liverpool.

Twenty-six players made at least one appearance in nationally organised first-team competition, and there were twelve different goalscorers. Forwards Benny Green and Billy Jones were ever-present over the 39-match season; full-back Frank Stokes and half-backs Billy Beer and Walter Wigmore missed only one, and three other players exceeded 30 appearances. Billy Jones was leading scorer with 15 goals, all of which came in the league.

The last league match at the Coventry Road ground, which no longer met the club's needs, was played on 22 December 1906. Birmingham beat Bury 3–1. The last goal was scored by Arthur Mounteney, and the Birmingham Daily Post described how

At the conclusion of the match the band played "Auld Lang Syne", and the crowd silently left the ground which has been the home of the club for so many years and the scene of many brilliant victories and many heartbreaking defeats, and of an uphill struggle from which the club, thanks to the courage of the directors, has at length emerged triumphant.

Within months the ground had been demolished and the land cleared for housing.

Construction of the St Andrew's Ground, in the Bordesley district some three-quarters of a mile (1 km) closer to the city centre, had taken less than a year from leasing the land to official opening on Boxing Day 1906. Heavy overnight snowfall put the ceremony, and the scheduled match against Middlesbrough, at risk. Dozens of volunteers, including members of the club's board, worked all morning to clear the pitch. The game finally kicked off an hour late, finishing goalless in front of 32,000 spectators. The Birmingham Daily Post editorial next day suggested that "the fact that so many spectators attended under such adverse conditions augurs well for the step that the directors have taken", and that the directors were "to be congratulated in having provided their supporters with a ground second to none in the country". The Football Association chose the ground to host the FA Cup semi-final in March 1907 between Sheffield Wednesday and Woolwich Arsenal.

== Football League First Division ==
Date	League position	Opponents	Venue	Result	Score F–A	Scorers	Attendance
1 September 1906	18th	Preston North End	A	L	0–2		12,000
3 September 1906	15th	Bristol City	H	D	2–2	Green, Mounteney	12,000
8 September 1906	17th	Newcastle United	H	L	2–4	W.H. Jones, Beer	20,000
15 September 1906	17th	Aston Villa	A	L	1–4	Mounteney	45,000
22 September 1906	14th	Liverpool	H	W	2–1	W.H. Jones, Mounteney	10,000
29 September 1906	16th	Bristol City	A	D	0–0		15,000
6 October 1906	14th	Notts County	H	W	2–0	Stokes, Kearns	10,000
13 October 1906	15th	Sheffield United	A	L	0–2		10,000
20 October 1906	12th	Bolton Wanderers	H	W	4–2	W.H. Jones, Beer pen, Anderson	15,000
27 October 1906	15th	Manchester United	A	L	1–2	W.H. Jones	12,000
3 November 1906	14th	Stoke	H	W	2–1	W.H. Jones 2	8,000
10 November 1906	14th	Blackburn Rovers	A	L	0–1		12,000
17 November 1906	12th	Sunderland	H	W	2–0	W.H. Jones, Tickle	10,000
24 November 1906	10th	Derby County	H	W	2–1	Anderson, Wigmore	10,000
1 December 1906	13th	Everton	A	L	0–3		14,000
8 December 1906	11th	Woolwich Arsenal	H	W	5–1	Green 2, W.H. Jones 2, Beer	19,000
15 December 1906	10th	Sheffield Wednesday	A	W	1–0	Beer	10,000
22 December 1906	9th	Bury	H	W	3–1	Mounteney 2, Wigmore	6,000
25 December 1906	8th	Manchester City	A	L	0–1		14,000
26 December 1906	9th	Middlesbrough	H	D	0–0		32,000
29 December 1906	7th	Preston North End	H	W	3–0	Green 2, W.H. Jones	25,000
1 January 1907	8th	Middlesbrough	A	L	0–1		20,000
5 January 1907	10th	Newcastle United	A	L	0–2		28,000
19 January 1907	9th	Aston Villa	H	W	3–2	Glover, Mounteney, Green	60,000
26 January 1907	10th	Liverpool	A	L	0–2		14,000
9 February 1907	9th	Notts County	A	D	2–2	W.H. Jones 2	10,000
16 February 1907	9th	Sheffield United	H	D	0–0		12,000
2 March 1907	9th	Manchester United	H	D	1–1	Morris	20,000
9 March 1907	10th	Stoke	A	L	0–3		3,000
11 March 1907	9th	Bolton Wanderers	A	W	3–2	Tickle, Green, Anderson	5,000
16 March 1907	8th	Blackburn Rovers	H	W	2–0	W.H. Jones, Tickle	10,000
23 March 1907	8th	Sunderland	A	L	1–4	Anderson	15,000
29 March 1907	8th	Manchester City	H	W	4–0	Green, Gooch, Anderson, W.H. Jones	16,000
30 March 1907	8th	Derby County	A	D	1–1	Wigmore	5,000
6 April 1907	9th	Everton	H	W	1–0	Green	12,000
13 April 1907	9th	Woolwich Arsenal	A	L	1–2	Glover	15,000
25 April 1907	9th	Sheffield Wednesday	H	D	1–1	Morris	10,000
27 April 1907	9th	Bury	A	L	0–1		5,000

=== League table (part) ===
Final First Division table (part)
Pos	Club	Pld	W	D	L	F	A	GA	Pts
7th	Woolwich Arsenal	38	20	4	14	66	59	1.12	44
8th	Manchester United	38	17	8	13	53	56	0.95	42
9th	Birmingham	38	15	8	15	52	52	1.00	38
10th	Sunderland	38	14	9	15	65	66	0.98	37
11th	Middlesbrough	38	15	6	17	56	63	0.89	36
Key	Pos = League position; Pld = Matches played; W = Matches won; D = Matches drawn; L = Matches lost; F = Goals for; A = Goals against; GA = Goal average; Pts = Points								
Source									

== FA Cup ==
Round	Date	Opponents	Venue	Result	Score F–A	Scorers	Attendance
First round	12 January 1907	Liverpool	A	L	1–2	Green pen	20,000

== Appearances and goals ==
This table includes appearances and goals in nationally organised competitive matches – the Football League and FA Cup – only.
For a description of the playing positions, see Formation (association football)#2–3–5 (Pyramid).
Players marked † left the club during the playing season.

Players' appearances and goals by competition
Name	Position	League		FA Cup		Total	
Name	Position	Apps	Goals	Apps	Goals	Apps	Goals
Jack Dorrington	Goalkeeper	2	0	0	0	2	0
Nat Robinson	Goalkeeper	36	0	1	0	37	0
John Glover	Full back	33	2	1	0	34	2
John Kearns	Full back	9	1	0	0	10	1
Frank Stokes	Full back	37	1	1	0	38	1
Billy Beer	Half back	38	4	1	0	38	4
Frank Cornan	Half back	13	0	0	0	13	0
Jim Dougherty	Half back	26	0	1	0	27	0
Arthur Hallworth	Half back	1	0	0	0	1	0
Ambrose Hartwell	Half back	1	0	0	0	1	0
Charles Harvey	Half back	1	0	0	0	1	0
Walter Wigmore	Half back	37	3	1	0	38	3
George Anderson	Forward	31	5	1	0	32	5
Edmund Eyre	Forward	2	0	0	0	2	0
Percy Gooch	Forward	3	1	0	0	3	1
Benny Green	Forward	38	9	1	1	39	10
Roly Harper †	Forward	7	0	1	0	8	0
Aaron Jones	Forward	1	0	0	0	1	0
Billy Jones	Forward	38	15	1	0	39	15
Conyers Kirby	Forward	1	0	0	0	1	0
Bill McCafferty	Forward	4	0	0	0	4	0
Arthur Morris	Forward	3	2	0	0	3	2
Arthur Mounteney	Forward	25	6	1	0	26	6
Jack Smith †	Forward	3	0	0	0	3	0
George Southall	Forward	9	0	0	0	9	0
Charlie Tickle	Forward	19	3	0	0	19	3

== See also ==
- Birmingham City F.C. seasons
