= 1907–08 Birmingham F.C. season =

Birmingham F.C.
1907–08 season
- Chairman: Walter W. Hart
- Secretary-manager: Alf Jones
- Ground: St Andrew's
- Football League First Division: 20th (relegated)
- FA Cup: First round (eliminated by West Bromwich Albion)
- Top goalscorer: League: Benny Green, Edmund Eyre (8); All: Edmund Eyre (9)
- Highest home attendance: 45,000 vs Aston Villa, 21 September 1907
- Lowest home attendance: 2,000 vs Nottingham Forest, 30 March 1908
- Average home league attendance: 15,105
Team colours

The 1907–08 English football season was Birmingham Football Club's 16th in the Football League and their 8th in the First Division. They were in the relegation positions by mid-October, and only once, briefly, rose above them, finishing bottom of the 20-team league, four points adrift of safety, and were relegated to the Second Division for 1908–09. They also took part in the 1907–08 FA Cup, entering at the first round proper and losing in that round to West Bromwich Albion after a replay.

Alf Jones stepped down as secretary-manager at the end of the season. Jones began acting as unpaid secretary for Small Heath Alliance in 1885, the year the club turned professional, became their first paid secretary with responsibility for team matters in 1892, when the club first joined the Football League, and had held the post of secretary-manager ever since. He was succeeded by Alex Watson.

Twenty-eight players made at least one appearance in nationally organised first-team competition, and there were ten different goalscorers. Forward Benny Green played in 38 of the 40 matches over the season. Edmund Eyre was leading scorer with nine goals; in the league, Eyre and Green each scored eight.

Shortly before the match against Nottingham Forest in February was due to start, a severe gale blew sections of the corrugated-iron roof off the grandstand. Although the match went ahead, it was abandoned after 35 minutes because of the wind.

== Football League First Division ==
Date	League position	Opponents	Venue	Result	Score F–A	Scorers	Attendance
4 September 1907	16th	Middlesbrough	A	L	0–1		16,000
7 September 1907	7th	Preston North End	H	W	2–0	Mounteney	10,000
14 September 1907	15th	Bury	A	L	0–1		14,000
16 September 1907	16th	Bury	H	L	0–1		12,000
21 September 1907	17th	Aston Villa	H	L	2–3	Eyre, Tickle	45,000
28 September 1907	16th	Liverpool	A	W	4–3	Green, Mounteney 2, Eyre	20,000
5 October 1907	16th	Middlesbrough	H	L	1–4	Green	16,000
12 October 1907	19th	Sheffield United	A	L	0–1		13,000
19 October 1907	19th	Chelsea	H	D	1–1	Green	20,000
26 October 1907	19th	Nottingham Forest	A	D	1–1	Green	12,000
2 November 1907	19th	Manchester United	H	L	3–4	Jones, Eyre 2	20,000
9 November 1907	20th	Blackburn Rovers	A	L	0–1		6,000
16 November 1907	19th	Bolton Wanderers	H	W	2–1	Green, Eyre	15,000
23 November 1907	20th	Newcastle United	A	L	0–8		20,000
7 December 1907	20th	Sunderland	H	L	0–2		10,000
14 December 1907	20th	Woolwich Arsenal	A	D	1–1	Green	3,000
21 December 1907	20th	Sheffield Wednesday	H	W	2–1	Drake, Jones	12,000
25 December 1907	20th	Manchester City	H	W	2–1	Eyre, Bluff	12,000
26 December 1907	20th	Notts County	H	D	0–0		20,000
27 December 1907	20th	Notts County	A	D	0–0		12,000
28 December 1907	19th	Bristol City	A	D	0–0		10,000
4 January 1908	20th	Preston North End	A	D	1–1	Jones	8,000
18 January 1908	19th	Aston Villa	A	W	3–2	Eyre, Green, Drake	39,500
25 January 1908	19th	Liverpool	H	D	1–1	Mounteney	18,000
8 February 1908	20th	Sheffield United	H	D	0–0		16,000
15 February 1908	19th	Chelsea	A	D	2–2	Jones, Eyre	17,000
29 February 1908	20th	Manchester United	A	L	0–1		10,000
7 March 1908	20th	Blackburn Rovers	H	D	1–1	Mounteney	5,000
14 March 1908	20th	Bolton Wanderers	A	L	0–1		13,047
18 March 1908	20th	Everton	A	L	1–4	Tickle	10,000
21 March 1908	20th	Newcastle United	H	D	1–1	Tickle	20,000
28 March 1908	19th	Everton	H	W	2–1	Jones, Beer	15,000
30 March 1908	20th	Nottingham Forest	H	W	1–0	Jones	2,000
4 April 1908	20th	Sunderland	A	L	0–1		16,000
11 April 1908	20th	Woolwich Arsenal	H	L	1–2	Beer	15,000
17 April 1908	20th	Manchester City	A	L	1–2	Mounteney	25,000
18 April 1908	20th	Sheffield Wednesday	A	W	4–1	Jones, Beer, Anderson, Green	8,000
25 April 1908	18th	Bristol City	H	L	0–4		4,000

=== League table (part) ===
Final First Division table (part)
Pos	Club	Pld	W	D	L	F	A	GA	Pts
16th	Sunderland	38	16	3	19	78	75	1.04	35
17th	Sheffield United	38	12	11	15	52	58	0.90	35
18th	Notts County	38	13	8	17	39	51	0.77	34
19th	Bolton Wanderers	38	14	5	19	52	58	0.90	33
20th	Birmingham	38	9	12	19	40	60	0.67	30
Key	Pos = League position; Pld = Matches played; W = Matches won; D = Matches drawn; L = Matches lost; F = Goals for; A = Goals against; GA = Goal average; Pts = Points								
Source									

== FA Cup ==
Round	Date	Opponents	Venue	Result	Score F–A	Scorers	Attendance
First round	11 January 1907	West Bromwich Albion	A	L	1–1	Jones	36,727
First round replay	15 January 1907	West Bromwich Albion	H	L	1–2	Eyre	24,895

== Appearances and goals ==
This table includes appearances and goals in nationally organised competitive matches – the Football League and FA Cup – only.
For a description of the playing positions, see Formation (association football)#2–3–5 (Pyramid).
Players marked † left the club during the playing season.

Players' appearances and goals by competition
Name	Position	League		FA Cup		Total	
Name	Position	Apps	Goals	Apps	Goals	Apps	Goals
Jack Dorrington	Goalkeeper	24	0	2	0	24	0
Nat Robinson	Goalkeeper	14	0	0	0	14	0
Walter Corbett	Full back	11	0	1	0	12	0
Bob Fairman	Full back	3	0	0	0	3	0
John Glover	Full back	13	0	0	0	13	0
John Kearns	Full back	23	0	2	0	25	0
Frank Stokes	Full back	28	0	1	0	29	0
Billy Beer	Half back	34	3	2	0	36	3
Frank Cornan	Half back	26	0	2	0	28	0
Jim Dougherty	Half back	6	0	0	0	6	0
Tom Handley	Half back	1	0	0	0	1	0
Ambrose Hartwell	Half back	1	0	0	0	1	0
Walter Wigmore	Half back	35	1	2	0	37	1
George Anderson	Forward	8	1	0	0	8	1
Edgar Bluff	Forward	9	1	0	0	9	1
Alonzo Drake	Forward	11	2	2	0	13	2
Edmund Eyre	Forward	31	8	2	1	33	9
Percy Gooch	Forward	1	0	0	0	1	0
Benny Green	Forward	36	8	2	0	38	8
John Higgins	Forward	1	0	0	0	1	0
Ezra Holmes †	Forward	2	0	0	0	2	0
Billy Jones	Forward	23	7	2	1	25	8
Harry King	Forward	1	0	0	0	1	0
George Moore	Forward	1	0	0	0	1	0
Arthur Morris	Forward	1	0	0	0	1	0
Arthur Mounteney	Forward	25	6	0	0	25	6
Billy Peplow	Forward	17	0	0	0	17	0
Charlie Tickle	Forward	31	3	2	0	33	3
George Travers	Forward	1	0	0	0	1	0

== See also ==
- Birmingham City F.C. seasons
