= 1903–04 Small Heath F.C. season =

Small Heath F.C.
1903–04 season
- Chairman: Walter W. Hart
- Secretary-manager: Alf Jones
- Ground: Coventry Road
- Football League First Division: 11th
- FA Cup: Intermediate round (eliminated by Manchester United)
- Birmingham Senior Cup: First round (eliminated by Aston Villa)
- Top goalscorer: League: Billy Jones, Freddie Wilcox (8); All: Billy Jones, Freddie Wilcox (8)
- Highest home attendance: 25,000 vs Aston Villa, (19 September 1903)
- Lowest home attendance: 5,000 vs Stoke, (5 December 1903)
- Average home league attendance: 11,915
Team colours

The 1903–04 Football League season was Small Heath Football Club's 12th in the Football League and their 4th in the First Division, having been promoted from the Second Division as runners-up in 1902–03. After spending much of the season in the relegation places, they won six of the last nine matches to finish in 11th place in the 18-team league. They also took part in the 1903–04 FA Cup, entering at the intermediate round (between the qualifying rounds and the rounds proper) and losing in that round to Manchester United after three replays. In locally organised competition, they lost to Aston Villa in the first round of the Birmingham Senior Cup.

Twenty-three players made at least one appearance in nationally organised first-team competition, and there were twelve different goalscorers. Forward Charlie Athersmith played in 37 matches over the 38-match season. Billy Jones and Freddie Wilcox were joint leading scorers with eight goals, all of which came in the league.

== Football League First Division ==
Date	League position	Opponents	Venue	Result	Score F–A	Scorers	Attendance
1 September 1903	6th	Derby County	A	L	1–4	Leonard	5,000
5 September 1903	16th	Sheffield United	H	L	1–3	Wilcox	12,000
7 September 1903	11th	Nottingham Forest	H	D	3–3	Leonard, Wilcox, Athersmith	9,000
12 September 1903	15th	Newcastle United	H	L	1–3	Wilcox	6,000
19 September 1903	14th	Aston Villa	H	D	2–2	Wilcox, Robertson	25,000
26 September 1903	17th	Middlesbrough	A	L	1–3	Howard	20,000
3 October 1903	18th	Liverpool	H	L	1–2	Wigmore	10,000
10 October 1903	18th	Bury	A	L	0–1		4,000
17 October 1903	17th	Blackburn Rovers	H	W	2–1	Windridge 2	10,000
24 October 1903	15th	Nottingham Forest	A	W	1–0	Wilcox	7,000
31 October 1903	15th	Sheffield Wednesday	H	D	0–0		12,000
7 November 1903	17th	Sunderland	A	L	1–3	Wigmore	14,000
14 November 1903	17th	West Bromwich Albion	H	L	0–1		12,563
21 November 1903	17th	Wolverhampton Wanderers	A	L	0–1		7,000
28 November 1903	18th	Everton	A	L	1–5	Leonard	5,000
5 December 1903	17th	Stoke	H	W	1–0	Robertson	5,000
19 December 1903	18th	Manchester City	H	L	0–3		15,000
26 December 1903	18th	Notts County	A	L	0–2		12,000
2 January 1904	18th	Sheffield United	A	D	1–1	Jones	12,000
9 January 1904	17th	Newcastle United	H	W	3–0	Beer 2, Jones	8,000
16 January 1904	18th	Aston Villa	A	D	1–1	Green	20,000
23 January 1904	18th	Middlesbrough	H	D	2–2	Athersmith, Field	11,000
30 January 1904	16th	Liverpool	A	W	2–0	Jones, Wilcox	20,000
13 February 1904	16th	Blackburn Rovers	A	D	1–1	Jones	2,000
27 February 1904	18th	Sheffield Wednesday	A	L	2–3	Jones 2	7,000
5 March 1904	16th	Sunderland	H	W	2–1	Beer 2	12,000
12 March 1904	15th	West Bromwich Albion	A	W	1–0	Green	22,760
19 March 1904	14th	Wolverhampton Wanderers	H	W	3–0	Green, Beer, Wilcox	12,000
26 March 1904	13th	Everton	H	D	1–1	Beer	12,000
2 April 1904	15th	Stoke	A	L	0–1		6,000
4 April 1904	14th	Bury	H	W	1–0	Wilcox	15,000
9 April 1904	13th	Derby County	H	W	1–0	Jones	8,000
16 April 1904	14th	Manchester City	A	L	0–4		15,000
23 April 1904	11th	Notts County	H	W	2–0	Green, Jones	8,000

=== League table (part) ===
Final First Division table (part)
Pos	Club	Pld	W	D	L	F	A	GA	Pts
9th	Nottingham Forest	34	11	9	14	57	57	1.00	31
10th	Middlesbrough	34	9	12	13	46	47	0.98	30
11th	Small Heath	34	11	8	15	39	52	0.75	30
12th	Bury	34	7	15	12	40	53	0.76	29
13th	Notts County	34	12	5	17	37	61	0.61	29
Key	Pos = League position; Pld = Matches played; W = Matches won; D = Matches drawn; L = Matches lost; F = Goals for; A = Goals against; GA = Goal average; Pts = Points								
Source									

== FA Cup ==
Round	Date	Opponents	Venue	Result	Score F–A	Scorers	Attendance
Intermediate round	12 December 1903	Manchester United	A	D	1–1	Wassell	10,000
Int. round replay	16 December 1903	Manchester United	H	D	1–1 a.e.t	Leonard	4,000
Int. round second replay	21 December 1903	Manchester United	Bramall Lane, Sheffield	D	1–1 a.e.t	Field	5,000
Int. round third replay	11 January 1904	Manchester United	Hyde Road, Manchester	L	1–3	Athersmith	9,372

== Appearances and goals ==
This table includes appearances and goals in nationally organised competitive matches – the Football League and FA Cup – only.
For a description of the playing positions, see Formation (association football)#2–3–5 (Pyramid).
Players marked † left the club during the playing season.

Players' appearances and goals by competition
Name	Position	League		FA Cup		Total	
Name	Position	Apps	Goals	Apps	Goals	Apps	Goals
Jack Dorrington	Goalkeeper	3	0	0	0	3	0
Nat Robinson	Goalkeeper	31	0	4	0	35	0
Bill Bidmead	Full back	1	0	0	0	1	0
John Glover	Full back	14	0	0	0	14	0
Archie Goldie	Full back	10	0	0	0	10	0
Frank Stokes	Full back	26	0	4	0	30	0
Harold Wassell	Full back	16	0	3	1	19	1
Billy Beer	Half back	23	6	4	0	27	6
Fred Chaplin	Half back	4	0	0	0	4	0
Jim Dougherty	Half back	9	0	1	0	10	0
Ambrose Hartwell	Half back	4	0	1	0	5	0
John Hirons	Half back	2	0	0	0	2	0
Harry Howard	Half back	28	1	3	0	31	1
Walter Wigmore	Half back	31	2	4	0	35	2
Charlie Athersmith	Forward	33	2	4	1	37	3
Oakey Field	Forward	22	1	2	1	24	2
Benny Green	Forward	23	4	3	0	26	4
Billy Jones	Forward	21	8	2	0	23	8
Arthur Leonard †	Forward	16	3	2	1	18	4
Bob McRoberts	Forward	14	0	0	0	14	0
Jimmy Robertson	Forward	6	2	1	0	7	2
Freddie Wilcox	Forward	28	8	4	0	32	8
Jimmy Windridge	Forward	9	2	2	0	11	2

== See also ==
- Birmingham City F.C. seasons
