= 1902–03 Small Heath F.C. season =

Small Heath F.C.
1902–03 season
- Chairman: Walter W. Hart
- Secretary-manager: Alf Jones
- Ground: Coventry Road
- Football League Second Division: 2nd (promoted)
- FA Cup: First round (eliminated by Derby County)
- Birmingham Senior Cup: First round (eliminated by Aston Villa)
- Top goalscorer: League: Arthur Leonard (16); All: Arthur Leonard (16)
- Highest home attendance: 13,000 vs Chesterfield Town, 26 December 1902
- Lowest home attendance: 4,000 vs Manchester United, 20 April 1903
Home colours

The 1902–03 Football League season was Small Heath Football Club's 11th in the Football League and their 8th in the Second Division. Having been relegated in 1901–02, they reached the top two positions by mid-November and remained there for the rest of the season, finishing as runners-up in the 18-team league, so were promoted back to the First Division at the first attempt. They also took part in the 1902–03 FA Cup, entering at the first round proper (round of 32) and losing in that round to Derby County. In locally organised competition, they lost to Aston Villa in the first round of the Birmingham Senior Cup after two replays.

Twenty-two players made at least one appearance in nationally organised first-team competition, and there were eleven different goalscorers. Archie Goldie was ever-present over the 35-match season, his full-back partner Harold Wassell missed only one match, and six other players made at least 30 appearances. Arthur Leonard was leading scorer with 16 goals, all of which came in the league. The 12–0 defeat of Doncaster Rovers in April equalled the club record highest win.

== Football League Second Division ==
Date	League position	Opponents	Venue	Result	Score F–A	Scorers	Attendance
6 September 1902	3rd	Leicester Fosse	H	W	3–1	Field 2, McRoberts	6,000
13 September 1902	2nd	Manchester City	H	W	4–0	Jones, McMillan, Leonard 2	12,000
20 September 1902	6th	Burnley	A	L	1–2	McMillan	3,000
27 September 1902	4th	Preston North End	H	W	3–1	Leonard, McMillan, Wigmore	10,000
4 October 1902	3rd	Burslem Port Vale	A	D	2–2	McMillan, Athersmith	4,000
11 October 1902	3rd	Barnsley	H	W	2–1	Athersmith, Leonard	7,000
18 October 1902	5th	Gainsborough Trinity	A	L	0–1		3,000
25 October 1902	4th	Burton United	H	W	2–0	Field, Athersmith	5,000
1 November 1902	5th	Bristol City	A	D	1–1	McRoberts	12,000
8 November 1902	4th	Glossop	H	W	3–2	McRoberts 2, Beer	5,000
15 November 1902	3rd	Manchester United	A	W	1–0	Beer	24,000
22 November 1902	2nd	Stockport County	H	W	2–0	Beer, McRoberts	5,000
29 November 1902	1st	Blackpool	A	W	1–0	Leonard	3,000
6 December 1902	1st	Woolwich Arsenal	H	W	2–0	Leonard, Wigmore	10,000
13 December 1902	2nd	Doncaster Rovers	A	L	0–2		3,000
20 December 1902	2nd	Lincoln City	H	W	3–1	Harrison 2, Leonard	7,000
26 December 1902	2nd	Chesterfield Town	H	W	2–1	Athersmith, Beer	13,000
27 December 1902	2nd	Chesterfield Town	A	D	1–1	McRoberts	6,000
3 January 1903	2nd	Leicester Fosse	H	W	4–3	Leonard 2, Field, McRoberts	6,000
17 January 1903	2nd	Burnley	H	W	3–0	Leonard, Field, Athersmith	7,000
24 January 1903	2nd	Preston North End	A	L	1–2	Beer	7,000
31 January 1903	2nd	Burslem Port Vale	H	W	5–1	McRoberts, Jones, Beer, Windridge 2	6,000
14 February 1903	2nd	Gainsborough Trinity	H	W	1–0	McRoberts	7,000
21 February 1903	2nd	Burton United	A	W	1–0	McRoberts	3,000
23 February 1903	2nd	Manchester City	A	L	0–4		20,000
28 February 1903	2nd	Bristol City	H	W	2–0	Windridge 2	12,000
7 March 1903	2nd	Glossop	A	W	1–0	Windridge	2,000
21 March 1903	2nd	Stockport County	A	W	2–1	McRoberts, Harrison	4,000
28 March 1903	2nd	Blackpool	H	W	5–1	Wilcox 2, McRoberts, Beer pen, Wolstenholme og	7,000
4 April 1903	2nd	Woolwich Arsenal	A	L	1–6	McRoberts	15,000
10 April 1903	2nd	Lincoln City	A	W	1–0	Leonard	6,000
11 April 1903	2nd	Doncaster Rovers	H	W	12–0	Leonard 4, Wilcox 4, Athersmith, Field, McRoberts, Dougherty	8,000
13 April 1903	2nd	Barnsley	A	L	0–3		5,000
20 April 1903	2nd	Manchester United	H	W	2–1	Leonard, Wilcox	4,000

=== League table (part) ===
Final Second Division table (part)
Pos	Club	Pld	W	D	L	F	A	GA	Pts
1st	Manchester City	34	25	4	5	95	29	3.28	54
2nd	Small Heath	34	24	3	7	74	36	2.06	51
3rd	Woolwich Arsenal	34	20	8	6	66	30	2.20	48
4th	Bristol City	34	17	8	9	59	38	1.55	42
5th	Manchester United	34	15	8	11	53	38	1.40	38
Key	Pos = League position; Pld = Matches played; W = Matches won; D = Matches drawn; L = Matches lost; F = Goals for; A = Goals against; GA = Goal average; Pts = Points								
Source									

== FA Cup ==
Round	Date	Opponents	Venue	Result	Score F–A	Scorers	Attendance
First round	7 February 1903	Derby County	A	L	1–2	Windridge	15,000

== Appearances and goals ==
This table includes appearances and goals in nationally organised competitive matches – the Football League and FA Cup – only.
For a description of the playing positions, see Formation (association football)#2–3–5 (Pyramid).

Players' appearances and goals by competition
Name	Position	League		FA Cup		Total	
Name	Position	Apps	Goals	Apps	Goals	Apps	Goals
Nat Robinson	Goalkeeper	29	0	1	0	30	0
Jack Dorrington	Goalkeeper	5	0	0	0	5	0
Archie Goldie	Full back	34	0	1	0	35	0
Harold Wassell	Full back	33	0	1	0	34	0
Billy Beer	Half back	33	7	0	0	33	7
Jim Dougherty	Half back	31	1	1	0	32	1
Ambrose Hartwell	Half back	6	0	0	0	6	0
Harry Howard	Half back	4	0	0	0	4	0
Walter Wigmore	Half back	26	2	1	0	27	2
Charlie Athersmith	Forward	30	6	1	0	31	6
Oakey Field	Forward	17	6	1	0	18	6
Arthur Harrison	Forward	4	3	0	0	4	3
John Hirons	Forward	3	0	0	0	3	0
Billy Jones	Forward	14	2	1	0	15	2
Arthur Leonard	Forward	32	16	1	0	33	16
John McMillan	Forward	12	4	0	0	12	4
Bob McRoberts	Forward	31	14	1	0	32	14
Thomas Thompson	Forward	1	0	0	0	1	0
Charlie Tickle	Forward	2	0	0	0	2	0
Sid Wharton	Forward	14	0	0	0	14	0
Freddie Wilcox	Forward	6	7	0	0	6	7
Jimmy Windridge	Forward	7	5	1	1	8	6
