= 1904–05 Small Heath F.C. season =

Small Heath F.C.
1904–05 season
- Chairman: Walter W. Hart
- Secretary-manager: Alf Jones
- Ground: Coventry Road
- Football League First Division: 7th
- FA Cup: First round (eliminated by Portsmouth)
- Birmingham Senior Cup: Winner
- Top goalscorer: League: Billy Jones (16); All: Billy Jones (16)
- Highest home attendance: 32,000 vs Aston Villa, 25 February 1905
- Lowest home attendance: 8,000 vs Nottingham Forest, 11 March 1905
- Average home league attendance: 14,647
Team colours

The 1904–05 Football League season was Small Heath Football Club's 13th in the Football League and their 5th in the First Division. In third position in the 18-team league, only one point behind the leaders, with eight matches remaining, they gained only four points from the sixteen available, and finished seventh. They also took part in the 1904–05 FA Cup, entering at the first round proper and losing to Portsmouth in that round. In locally organised competition, they won the Birmingham Senior Cup for the first time, defeating West Bromwich Albion by seven goals to two. After this season, the club entered a primarily reserve team for this competition, which had previously not been permitted.

Nineteen players made at least one appearance in nationally organised first-team competition, and there were nine different goalscorers. Goalkeeper Nat Robinson, full-back Frank Stokes and forward Benny Green were all ever-present over the 35-match season. Billy Jones was leading scorer with 16 goals, all of which came in the league.

At an Extraordinary General Meeting held in March 1905, it was proposed that, Small Heath being the only major football club in the city since Birmingham St George's had folded in 1892, the club should be renamed Birmingham City F.C. The shareholders were not in favour, though they were prepared to go as far as plain Birmingham Football Club instead. Even this was a step too far for some; one reporter referred to "the Small Heath club now masquerading as Birmingham".

Events surrounding the February 1905 match with Aston Villa highlighted the Coventry Road ground's inadequacies. The official attendance was given as 28,000, though with the gates closed before kick-off, thousands scaled walls or forced entrances in order to gain admission, and the actual attendance was estimated at anything up to 35,000. The Birmingham Daily Mail reported "a constant stream of vehicles to the ground, while the trams were disgorging their freights at Muntz Street every two or three minutes." Inside, "the swaying of the mass of spectators rendered the placing of additional supports against the barriers a necessary precaution", and children were passed overhead and placed on the pitch for their own safety. The following Monday the same newspaper commented that had space been available, another ten or fifteen thousand spectators might well have attended, as "hundreds of people found the doors closed against them, and probably there were thousands who would not go to the ground in view of the inevitable crush." The club's landlords would neither sell the freehold of the ground nor allow its expansion, so the directors began planning to move to a new home.

== Football League First Division ==
Date	League position	Opponents	Venue	Result	Score F–A	Scorers	Attendance
3 September 1904	12th	Manchester City	A	L	1–2	Green pen	24,000
10 September 1904	17th	Notts County	H	L	1–2	Beer pen	15,000
17 September 1904	17th	Sheffield United	A	L	1–2	Beer pen	14,000
24 September 1904	16th	Newcastle United	H	W	2–1	W.H. Jones 2	13,000
1 October 1904	17th	Preston North End	A	D	2–2	Wilcox, McRoberts	10,000
8 October 1904	14th	Middlesbrough	H	W	2–1	Field, Beer pen	10,000
15 October 1904	11th	Wolverhampton Wanderers	A	W	1–0	Wilcox	8,000
22 October 1904	8th	Bury	H	W	5–0	Wilcox, Field, Green 2, McRoberts	15,000
29 October 1904	11th	Aston Villa	A	L	1–2	Wilcox	40,000
5 November 1904	8th	Blackburn Rovers	H	W	2–0	Wigmore, Green	15,000
12 November 1904	8th	Nottingham Forest	A	W	2–0	McRoberts, W.H. Jones	8,000
19 November 1904	4th	Sheffield Wednesday	H	W	2–1	W.H. Jones, Green	15,000
26 November 1904	4th	Sunderland	A	W	4–1	Wilcox, W.H. Jones 2, Green	12,000
3 December 1904	2nd	Woolwich Arsenal	H	W	2–1	Dougherty, W.H. Jones	12,000
10 December 1904	5th	Derby County	A	L	0–3		6,000
17 December 1904	7th	Everton	H	L	1–2	W.H. Jones	18,000
26 December 1904	5th	Middlesbrough	A	W	1–0	McRoberts	10,000
31 December 1904	5th	Manchester City	H	W	3–1	W.H. Jones 2, Wilcox	15,000
2 January 1905	5th	Bury	A	D	1–1	Green	9,000
7 January 1905	5th	Notts County	A	D	0–0		8,000
14 January 1905	5th	Sheffield United	H	W	2–0	W.H. Jones, Wilcox	12,000
21 January 1905	5th	Newcastle United	A	W	1–0	Tickle	24,000
28 January 1905	3rd	Preston North End	H	W	2–0	Wilcox 2	15,000
11 February 1905	2nd	Wolverhampton Wanderers	H	W	4–1	Wilcox 3, Green	15,000
25 February 1905	4th	Aston Villa	H	L	0–3		32,000
4 March 1905	3rd	Blackburn Rovers	A	W	4–1	W.H. Jones 2 (1 pen), Field, Beer	5,000
11 March 1905	4th	Nottingham Forest	H	L	1–2	Field	8,000
18 March 1905	5th	Sheffield Wednesday	A	L	1–3	Green	12,000
25 March 1905	5th	Sunderland	H	D	1–1	W.H. Jones	12,000
1 April 1905	5th	Woolwich Arsenal	A	D	1–1	W.H. Jones	18,000
8 April 1905	5th	Derby County	H	W	2–0	Green, W.H. Jones	12,000
15 April 1905	5th	Everton	A	L	1–2	Hartwell	20,000
22 April 1905	5th	Stoke	H	L	0–1		15,000
29 April 1905	7th	Stoke	A	L	0–1		2,000

=== League table (part) ===
Final First Division table (part)
Pos	Club	Pld	W	D	L	F	A	GA	Pts
5th	Sunderland	34	16	8	10	60	44	1.36	40
6th	Sheffield United	34	19	2	13	64	56	1.14	40
7th	Small Heath	34	17	5	12	59	38	1.42	39
8th	Preston North End	34	13	10	11	52	47	1.14	36
9th	Sheffield Wednesday	34	14	5	15	61	57	1.07	33
Key	Pos = League position; Pld = Matches played; W = Matches won; D = Matches drawn; L = Matches lost; F = Goals for; A = Goals against; GA = Goal average; Pts = Points								
Source									

== FA Cup ==
Round	Date	Opponents	Venue	Result	Score F–A	Scorers	Attendance
First round	4 February 1905	Portsmouth	H	L	0–2		25,000

== Appearances and goals ==
This table includes appearances and goals in nationally organised competitive matches – the Football League and FA Cup – only.
For a description of the playing positions, see Formation (association football)#2–3–5 (Pyramid).

Players' appearances and goals by competition
Name	Position	League		FA Cup		Total	
Name	Position	Apps	Goals	Apps	Goals	Apps	Goals
Nat Robinson	Goalkeeper	34	0	1	0	35	0
John Glover	Full back	24	0	1	0	25	0
Ambrose Hartwell	Full back	15	1	0	0	15	1
Frank Stokes	Full back	34	0	1	0	35	0
Billy Beer	Half back	31	4	0	0	31	4
Jack Bird	Half back	0	0	1	0	1	0
Jim Dougherty	Half back	25	1	1	0	26	1
Harry Howard	Half back	13	0	0	0	13	0
Alfred Sellman	Half back	1	0	0	0	1	0
Walter Wigmore	Half back	28	1	1	0	29	1
Charlie Athersmith	Forward	5	0	0	0	0	0
Oakey Field	Forward	30	4	0	0	30	4
Benny Green	Forward	34	10	1	0	35	10
Charles Harvey	Forward	1	0	0	0	1	0
Billy Jones	Forward	30	16	1	0	31	16
Thomas Jones	Forward	2	0	1	0	3	0
Bob McRoberts	Forward	14	4	0	0	14	4
Charlie Tickle	Forward	16	1	1	0	17	1
Freddie Wilcox	Forward	27	12	1	0	28	12
Jimmy Windridge	Forward	10	0	0	0	10	0

== See also ==
- Birmingham City F.C. seasons
