= 1905–06 Birmingham F.C. season =

Birmingham City F.C.
1905–06 season
- Chairman: Walter W. Hart
- Secretary-manager: Alf Jones
- Ground: Coventry Road
- Football League First Division: 7th
- FA Cup: Fourth round (eliminated by Newcastle United)
- Top goalscorer: League: Billy Jones (22); All: Billy Jones (24)
- Highest home attendance: 30,000 vs Aston Villa, 16 September 1905
- Lowest home attendance: 3,000 vs Manchester City, 28 April 1906
- Average home league attendance: 12,526
Team colours

The 1905–06 Football League season was Birmingham Football Club's 14th in the Football League, their 6th in the First Division, and their first season under the Birmingham name, having previously played as Small Heath. They finished in seventh place in the 20-team league. They also took part in the 1905–06 FA Cup, entering at the first round proper and losing to Newcastle United in the fourth round (quarter-final) after a replay.

Twenty-three players made at least one appearance in nationally organised first-team competition, and there were twelve different goalscorers. Goalkeeper Nat Robinson was ever-present over the 44-match season; among outfield players, forwards Benny Green (footballer) and Billy Jones missed two and three matches respectively. Billy Jones was leading scorer with 24 goals, of which 22 came in the league.

The Coventry Road ground, by then surrounded by tightly-packed housing, had more than once proved too small to accommodate those wishing to attend. Against Aston Villa last season, "hundreds of people found the doors closed against them, and probably there were thousands who would not go to the ground in view of the inevitable crush", and attendance at the FA Cup fourth-round tie against Newcastle was restricted to 27,000 with "probably 60,000 people anxious to attend". The landlords had raised the rent, but refused either to sell the freehold or to allow further expansion to the ground, and the directors estimated that remaining at Coventry Road was losing the club as much as £2,000 a year in revenue. Club director Harry Morris identified a site three-quarters of a mile (1 km) nearer the city centre, on the site of a disused brickworks in the Bordesley district, where a new ground could be built. The directors signed a 21-year lease and work began on what would become St Andrew's Ground.

== Football League First Division ==
| Date | League position | Opponents | Venue | Result | Score F–A | Scorers | Attendance |
|---|---|---|---|---|---|---|---|
| 2 September 1905 | 9th | Preston North End | H | D | 1–1 | W.H. Jones | 25,000 |
| 9 September 1905 | 10th | Newcastle United | A | D | 2–2 | Green, Wilcox | 28,000 |
| 16 September 1905 | 7th | Aston Villa | H | W | 2–0 | W.H. Jones, Mounteney | 30,000 |
| 23 September 1905 | 9th | Liverpool | A | L | 0–2 | | 24,000 |
| 30 September 1905 | 8th | Sheffield United | H | W | 2–0 | Wilcox, Mounteney | 18,000 |
| 7 October 1905 | 9th | Notts County | A | D | 0–0 | | 15,000 |
| 14 October 1905 | 7th | Stoke | H | W | 2–0 | W.H. Jones 2 | 8,000 |
| 21 October 1905 | 5th | Bolton Wanderers | A | W | 1–0 | W.H. Jones | 20,000 |
| 28 October 1905 | 4th | Woolwich Arsenal | H | W | 2–1 | Beer, W.H. Jones | 15,000 |
| 4 November 1905 | 5th | Blackburn Rovers | A | L | 1–5 | Cornan | 8,000 |
| 11 November 1905 | 5th | Sunderland | H | W | 3–0 | Anderson, W.H. Jones, Tickle | 15,000 |
| 18 November 1905 | 4th | Wolverhampton Wanderers | A | D | 0–0 | | 5,000 |
| 25 November 1905 | 3rd | Everton | A | W | 2–1 | W.H. Jones, Anderson | 10,000 |
| 2 December 1905 | 2nd | Derby County | H | W | 3–1 | Tickle, Mounteney, Wigmore | 18,000 |
| 9 December 1905 | 4th | Sheffield Wednesday | A | L | 2–4 | Tickle, W.H. Jones | 8,000 |
| 16 December 1905 | 3rd | Nottingham Forest | H | W | 5–0 | Wilcox 3, Harper, W.H. Jones | 12,000 |
| 23 December 1905 | 4th | Manchester City | A | L | 1–4 | Green | 15,000 |
| 25 December 1905 | 5th | Middlesbrough | A | L | 0–1 | | 18,000 |
| 26 December 1905 | 4th | Middlesbrough | H | W | 7–0 | Green 5, W.H. Jones, Williamson og | 15,000 |
| 28 December 1905 | 4th | Sheffield United | A | L | 0–3 | | 4,000 |
| 30 December 1905 | 6th | Preston North End | A | L | 0–3 | | 8,000 |
| 1 January 1906 | 9th | Bury | A | L | 0–1 | | 12,000 |
| 6 January 1906 | 11th | Newcastle United | A | L | 0–1 | | 8,000 |
| 20 January 1906 | 8th | Aston Villa | A | W | 3–1 | Mounteney, W.H. Jones, Dougherty | 40,000 |
| 27 January 1906 | 7th | Liverpool | H | W | 1–0 | Mounteney | 20,000 |
| 10 February 1906 | 5th | Notts County | H | W | 4–2 | Mounteney, Green, W.H. Jones 2 | 8,000 |
| 17 February 1906 | 4th | Stoke | A | D | 2–2 | W.H. Jones | 5,000 |
| 3 March 1906 | 6th | Woolwich Arsenal | A | L | 0–5 | | 20,000 |
| 17 March 1906 | 8th | Sunderland | A | L | 1–3 | Anderson | 15,000 |
| 24 March 1906 | 10th | Wolverhampton Wanderers | H | D | 3–3 | Mounteney, W.H. Jones 2 | 5,000 |
| 26 March 1906 | 11th | Bolton Wanderers | H | L | 2–5 | Mounteney, Tickle | 10,000 |
| 7 April 1906 | 11th | Derby County | A | D | 0–0 | | 4,000 |
| 9 April 1906 | 8th | Everton | H | W | 1–0 | Mounteney | 10,000 |
| 14 April 1906 | 7th | Sheffield Wednesday | H | W | 5–1 | Tickle 3, W.H. Jones 2 | 8,000 |
| 16 April 1906 | 10th | Bury | H | L | 0–3 | | 8,000 |
| 21 April 1906 | 10th | Nottingham Forest | A | L | 1–2 | W.H. Jones | 8,000 |
| 23 April 1906 | 8th | Blackburn Rovers | H | W | 3–0 | Mounteney, Smith, Green | 10,000 |
| 28 April 1906 | 7th | Manchester City | H | W | 3–2 | Green, W.H. Jones, Edmondson og | 3,000 |

=== League table (part) ===
Final First Division table (part)
| Pos | Club | Pld | W | D | L | F | A | GA | Pts |
|---|---|---|---|---|---|---|---|---|---|
| 5th | Manchester City | 38 | 19 | 5 | 14 | 73 | 54 | 1.31 | 43 |
| 6th | Bolton Wanderers | 38 | 17 | 7 | 14 | 81 | 67 | 1.25 | 41 |
| 7th | Birmingham | 38 | 17 | 7 | 14 | 65 | 59 | 1.10 | 41 |
| 8th | Aston Villa | 38 | 17 | 6 | 15 | 72 | 56 | 1.29 | 40 |
| 9th | Blackburn Rovers | 38 | 16 | 8 | 14 | 54 | 52 | 1.04 | 40 |
| Key | Pos = League position; Pld = Matches played; W = Matches won; D = Matches drawn; L = Matches lost; F = Goals for; A = Goals against; GA = Goal average; Pts = Points | | | | | | | | |
| Source | | | | | | | | | |

== FA Cup ==
| Round | Date | Opponents | Venue | Result | Score F–A | Scorers | Attendance |
|---|---|---|---|---|---|---|---|
| First round | 13 January 1906 | Preston North End | H | W | 1–0 | Beer | 10,000 |
| Second round | 3 February 1906 | Stoke | A | W | 1–0 | W.H. Jones | 15,000 |
| Third round | 24 February 1906 | Tottenham Hotspur | A | D | 1–1 | Harper | 28,000 |
| Third round replay | 28 February 1906 | Tottenham Hotspur | H | W | 2–0 a.e.t | Green, Mounteney | 34,000 |
| Fourth round | 10 March 1906 | Newcastle United | H | D | 2–2 | Green, W.H. Jones | 27,000 |
| Fourth round replay | 14 March 1906 | Newcastle United | A | L | 0–3 | | 39,059 |

== Appearances and goals ==
This table includes appearances and goals in nationally organised competitive matches – the Football League and FA Cup – only.
For a description of the playing positions, see Formation (association football)#2–3–5 (Pyramid).
Players marked † left the club during the playing season.

Players' appearances and goals by competition
| Name | Position | League | | FA Cup | | Total | |
| Name | Position | Apps | Goals | Apps | Goals | Apps | Goals |
|---|---|---|---|---|---|---|---|
| Nat Robinson | Goalkeeper | 38 | 0 | 6 | 0 | 44 | 0 |
| Bill Bidmead | Full back | 2 | 0 | 0 | 0 | 2 | 0 |
| John Glover | Full back | 32 | 0 | 6 | 0 | 38 | 0 |
| Ambrose Hartwell | Full back | 19 | 0 | 0 | 0 | 19 | 0 |
| Frank Stokes | Full back | 31 | 0 | 6 | 0 | 37 | 0 |
| Billy Beer | Half back | 26 | 1 | 6 | 1 | 32 | 2 |
| Frank Cornan | Half back | 15 | 1 | 5 | 0 | 20 | 1 |
| Jim Dougherty | Half back | 31 | 1 | 2 | 0 | 33 | 1 |
| Harry Howard | Half back | 3 | 0 | 0 | 0 | 3 | 0 |
| John Kearns | Half back | 2 | 0 | 0 | 0 | 2 | 0 |
| Jack Shufflebotham | Half back | 1 | 0 | 0 | 0 | 1 | 0 |
| Walter Wigmore | Half back | 28 | 1 | 6 | 0 | 34 | 1 |
| George Anderson | Forward | 23 | 3 | 5 | 0 | 28 | 3 |
| Oakey Field | Forward | 7 | 0 | 0 | 0 | 7 | 0 |
| Benny Green | Forward | 36 | 10 | 6 | 2 | 42 | 12 |
| Roly Harper | Forward | 15 | 1 | 6 | 1 | 21 | 2 |
| Aaron Jones | Forward | 4 | 0 | 0 | 0 | 4 | 0 |
| Billy Jones | Forward | 35 | 22 | 6 | 2 | 41 | 24 |
| Arthur Mounteney | Forward | 25 | 10 | 5 | 1 | 30 | 11 |
| Jack Smith | Forward | 3 | 1 | 0 | 0 | 3 | 1 |
| George Southall | Forward | 5 | 0 | 0 | 0 | 5 | 0 |
| Charlie Tickle | Forward | 20 | 7 | 0 | 0 | 20 | 7 |
| Freddie Wilcox † | Forward | 17 | 5 | 1 | 0 | 18 | 5 |

== See also ==
- Birmingham City F.C. seasons
