= Jack Dorrington =

English footballer (1881–1944)

Personal information
- Full name: John Dorrington
- Date of birth: 2 June 1881
- Place of birth: Smethwick, England
- Date of death: 9 January 1944 (aged 62)
- Place of death: Birmingham, England
- Height: 5 ft 10 in (1.78 m)
- Position: Goalkeeper

Senior career*
Years	Team	Apps	(Gls)
- Langley St Michael's
- West Smethwick
1899–1900	Soho Villa		
	West Bromwich Albion	0	(0)
1900–1901	Kidderminster Harriers		
1901–1913	Small Heath / Birmingham	106	(0)
- * Club domestic league appearances and goals

John Dorrington (2 June 1881 – 9 January 1944) was an English footballer who played as a goalkeeper. He spent his entire 12-year professional career with Birmingham (renamed from Small Heath in 1905), for which he made 106 appearances in the Football League.

Born in Smethwick in 1881, Dorrington played football for minor clubs in that area. While with Soho Villa, he signed amateur forms with West Bromwich Albion, but never played for their first team. After a year with Kidderminster Harriers of the Birmingham and District League, he joined Football League First Division club Small Heath in 1901. The consistency and reliability of Nat Robinson meant that Dorrington made only ten appearances in his first six seasons. He was first-choice goalkeeper for the next two years before injury intervened, then regained his place in 1909–10 before blood poisoning effectively put an end to his career and nearly cost him his leg. He retired from playing in 1913.

Dorrington then ran several pubs, organised charity football matches, and coached the junior teams at Aston Villa. He died in 1944 at the age of 62.

== Personal life ==
John Dorrington was born on 2 June 1881 in Smethwick, which was then in Staffordshire, the son of John and Julia Dorrington. At the time of the 1891 Census, the family were living in Watt Street, Handsworth, Dorrington's father was working as a steam hammerman, and there were five children. The 1901 Census records the 19-year-old Dorrington still living in the family home in Handsworth and working as a turner. He married Helen Sarah Jones in 1902.

Dorrington died in Birmingham General Hospital on 9 January 1944 after a short illness; he was 62. At the time of his death, he and his wife had a son and a daughter.

== Early football career ==
He played local football for Langley St Michaels and West Smethwick, and spent the 1899–1900 season with Soho Villa of the Birmingham Junior League. In September 1899, the Bromsgrove Messenger's "Spectator" thought he was "the least satisfactory member of his team, and seemed to lack confidence in dealing with shots", but five months later, the same reporter thought that "it says much for Dorrington's goalkeeping that the score was not much heavier." During that season, he signed amateur forms with Football League First Division club West Bromwich Albion, but made no appearances for the senior side. In 1900 he joined Kidderminster Harriers, where he earned himself a reputation as "a player with a big future [who] was held by many to be the smartest custodian in the Birmingham and District League."

Dorrington signed for Small Heath, newly promoted to the First Division, in May 1901 as backup for the established Nat Robinson. Robinson was ever-present through the 1901–02 relegation season and into October 1902, when a bad cold kept him at home, allowing Dorrington to make his club and Football League debut as a late replacement in a 2–2 draw away to Burslem Port Vale. The Sports Argus opined that "Good reserve goalkeepers are not picked up at every street corner. But in Dorrington, Small Heath have one who is quite capable of adequately stepping into Robinson's shoes at any time." A 6–1 defeat away to fellow promotion hopefuls Woolwich Arsenal saw Robinson dropped in favour of Dorrington for the last four matches of the season, and three wins were enough to secure runners-up spot. Dorrington began the 1903–04 First Division season as first choice, but ten goals conceded in the first three games by a team disrupted by injuries cost him his place, and Robinson played out the rest of the season.

It was not for another three years, with Robinson away representing the Football League XI against their Irish counterparts, that Dorrington next appeared for the first team, by which the club had renamed itself Birmingham; they lost 2–0 to Sheffield United. He was granted a benefit match to recognise five years' service, and the reserve match against West Bromwich Albion on Christmas Eve 1906 – the last game played at Coventry Road before the club moved to its newly built St Andrew's Ground – was chosen; 2,000 spectators turned up to see Birmingham win 5–2 on a soaking pitch and Dorrington save a penalty.

== Regular first-team football ==
Dorrington finally replaced Robinson as first-choice goalkeeper in November 1907, "it being thought advisable, owing to the latter suffering from nervous strain, to engage him in less strenuous football." It was not a generally popular decision, and it took Dorrington a few matches to settle, but he "soon began to improve, and in a few weeks he was as capable a custodian as could be found".

Nevertheless, the team returned to the second tier for the 1908–09 season, during which Dorrington missed four matches with a shoulder injury but was otherwise ever-present. In his column in Thomson's Weekly News in February 1909, he wrote that "if Birmingham had had anything like luck this season in the matter of freedom from injuries they might now be well in the running for promotion." They finished 11th of 20. He also enhanced his reputation as a saver of penalties with three in two matches in September 1908, one in a draw with Fulham when the taker scuffed his kick, and two in the Lord Mayor's Charity Cup against Aston Villa two days later. Birmingham led 3–1 when Villa were awarded a penalty for handball, which Harry Hampton took and Dorrington saved, but before Joe Bache could reach the rebound, he was tripped; Hampton took the second kick, and Dorrington again saved. Birmingham won the match 5–2. The match referee, J.G.A. Sharpe, wrote afterwards that "Dorrington is a wonder at saving penalties, and Birmingham will do well to play him regular in the first team."

Dorrington began the 1909–10 season in the first team, but after a 2–0 defeat away to Clapton Orient in November in which both goals came from his errors, he missed the next game with a sprained ankle, Arthur Box took over, and Dorrington played only twice more, the following April. The team finished bottom of the table and were re-elected to the League. Box moved on, Dorrington stayed, and again began the season as first choice. In October, he was the only representative of the Birmingham club to be selected for the Birmingham Association eleven to face their London counterparts in an inter-association match; London won 3–0.

== Injuries put an end to his career ==
Facing Wolverhampton Wanderers in November 1910, he dived to block a forward in the act of shooting and was kicked in the shoulder; while he was lying on the ground injured, the forward regained the ball and scored. The initial diagnosis was a broken shoulderblade, although the player believed there was no fracture, and he missed only three matches. During the drawn cup-tie against Oldham Athletic in January 1911, Dorrington suffered a cut knee, which became inflamed; he neglected to have it treated because he wanted to play in the replay. Blood poisoning ensued, an operation was performed at the Queen's Hospital, and "had another few hours elapsed amputation would probably have been necessary." He underwent further procedures over the next two weeks before being discharged from hospital, and later went on holiday to Bournemouth to aid his recovery. He finally retook the field for Birmingham's reserves on 3 April, and in the absence of Horace Bailey from the last match of the Second Division season, "proved that he [had] lost none of his skill as a custodian."

A mistake in the opening match of the 1911–12 season – allowing a ball to bounce over his shoulder and into the net – cost him his place. He made three league appearances in December, standing in for the amateur Bailey, whose business kept him unavailable, and in January 1912 injured an ankle and was out for several months. In 1912–13, his last season as a Birmingham player, his benefit match attracted a crowd of 8,000 and raised some £150. When not required for playing duties, he helped coach the players and acted as a scout for the club. According to the Evening Despatch, "the fact that the "Blues"' Reserves have done so well this season" – the team finished fifth in the Birmingham League that season, and two years later won the title – "is a tribute to his judgment. Most of the reserves have been signed up on the ex-custodian's recommendation." West Midlands football historian Tony Matthews described him as "a grand servant to Blues, totally fearless, with a jovial temperament that did wonders for morale, even in difficult times."

== Later life and career ==
After retiring as a player, Dorrington went into the pub trade, first with the Green Dragon in Kinver, from where he organised a football team to play in the Kidderminster League. He was at the Dudley Arms in Cape Hill, Smethwick, and took over at the Holte Hotel, near Villa Park, in late 1924.

He was active in arranging charity football matches, and inaugurated an annual match between ex-professional players and the local police team in aid of the Smethwick Cripples' Union. In the 1930s, Dorrington worked as a scout for Aston Villa, and managed their Birmingham Combination team. He also ran a newsagent's and tobacconist's shop in Soho Road, Birmingham.

== Career statistics ==
Appearances and goals by club, season and competition
Club	Season	League			FA Cup		Total	
Club	Season	Division	Apps	Goals	Apps	Goals	Apps	Goals
Small Heath	1901–02	First Division	0	0	0	0	0	0
Small Heath	1902–03	Second Division	5	0	0	0	5	0
Small Heath	1903–04	First Division	3	0	0	0	3	0
Small Heath	1904–05	First Division	0	0	0	0	0	0
Birmingham	1905–06	First Division	0	0	0	0	0	0
Birmingham	1906–07	First Division	2	0	0	0	2	0
Birmingham	1907–08	First Division	24	0	2	0	26	0
Birmingham	1908–09	Second Division	34	0	1	0	35	0
Birmingham	1909–10	Second Division	14	0	0	0	14	0
Birmingham	1910–11	Second Division	19	0	2	0	21	0
Birmingham	1911–12	Second Division	4	0	0	0	4	0
Birmingham	1912–13	Second Division	1	0	0	0	1	0
Career total			106	0	5	0	111	0

== Honours ==
Small Heath

- Football League Second Division runners-up: 1902–03

== Sources ==
- Matthews, Tony (1995). Birmingham City: A Complete Record. Derby: Breedon Books. ISBN 978-1-85983-010-9.
