= 1908–09 Aston Villa F.C. season =

English football club season

Aston Villa
1908–09 season
- President: Joseph Ansell
- Chairman: Frederick Rinder
- Manager: George Ramsay
- First Division: 7th
- FA Cup: 1st round
Home colours

The 1908–09 English football season was Aston Villa's 21st season in the Football League. Villa entered the 1908–09 Football League season in the First Division, the top flight of English football at the time. The season fell in what was to be called Villa's golden era.

== First Division ==
Pos	Team	Pld	W	D	L	GF	GA	GAv	Pts
5	The Wednesday	38	17	6	15	67	61	1.098	40
6	Woolwich Arsenal	38	14	10	14	52	49	1.061	38
7	Aston Villa	38	14	10	14	58	56	1.036	38
8	Bristol City	38	13	12	13	45	58	0.776	38
9	Middlesbrough	38	14	9	15	59	53	1.113	37

Source: World Football
Rules for classification: 1) Points; 2) Goal average; 3) Goals scored

Matches

1 September 1908	Liverpool	3–2	Aston Villa	Anfield
		Report	Jock Logan (2'); Alec Logan (80')

5 September 1908	Aston Villa	1–1	Wednesday	Villa Park
	Joe Walters (74')	Report

12 September 1908	Nottingham Forest	1–2	Aston Villa	City Ground
		Report	Joe Bache (44'); Harry Hampton (55')

19 September 1908	Aston Villa	2–0	Sunderland	Villa Park
	Harry Hampton (35'); Joe Bache (80')	Report

26 September 1908	Chelsea	0–2	Aston Villa	Stamford Bridge
		Report	Joe Bache (34'); George Reeves (64')

3 October 1908	Aston Villa	1–1	Blackburn	Villa Park
	Joe Bache (17')	Report

10 October 1908	Bradford	1–1	Aston Villa	Valley Parade
		Report	Joe Bache (40')

17 October 1908	Aston Villa	3–1	Manchester United	Villa Park
	George Reeves (8', 65'); Harry Hampton (35')	Report

24 October 1908	Everton	3–1	Aston Villa	Goodison Park
		Report	George Reeves (53')

31 October 1908	Aston Villa	1–1	Leicester	Villa Park
	Joe Bache (60')	Report

7 November 1908	Arsenal	0–1	Aston Villa	Manor Ground
		Report	Joe Bache (84')

14 November 1908	Aston Villa	1–1	Notts County	Villa Park
	Albert Hall (1–1)	Report

21 November 1908	Aston Villa	2–0	Newcastle	St James' Park
	Charlie Wallace (1–0); George Reeves (68')	Report

28 November 1908	Aston Villa	1–1	Bristol City	Villa Park
	Joe Bache (68')	Report

5 December 1908	Preston North End	3–2	Aston Villa	Deepdale
		Report	Charlie Wallace (18'); Joe Bache (90')

12 December 1908	Aston Villa	0–3	Middlesbrough	Villa Park
		Report

19 December 1908	Manchester City	2–0	Aston Villa	Hyde Road
		Report

25 December 1908	Aston Villa	1–1	Liverpool	Villa Park
	Alec Logan (60')	Report

26 December 1908	Aston Villa	3–0	Bury	Villa Park
	George Travers (4', 17', 25')	Report

1 January 1909	Bury	1–2	Aston Villa	Gigg Lane
		Report	George Reeves (41'); Edmund Eyre (70')

2 January 1909	Wednesday	4–2	Aston Villa	Owlerton
		Report	Chris Buckley (77'); George Reeves (88')

9 January 1909	Aston Villa	1–2	Nottingham Forest	Villa Park
	Harry Hampton (12')	Report

23 January 1909	Sunderland	4–3	Aston Villa	Roker Park
		Report	Edmund Eyre (43'); Jock Logan (62'); Alec Logan (85')

30 January 1909	Aston Villa	0–0	Chelsea	Villa Park
		Report

6 February 1909	Sheffield United	3–1	Aston Villa	Bramall Lane
		Report	Harry Hampton (20')

13 February 1909	Bradford	3–1	Aston Villa	Valley Parade
		Report	Charlie Wallace (86')

15 February 1909	Blackburn	3–1	Aston Villa	Ewood Park
		Report	Harry Hampton (1')

27 February 1909	Aston Villa	3–1	Everton	Villa Park
	Harry Hampton (30', 39'); Joe Walters (43')	Report

13 March 1909	Aston Villa	2–1	Arsenal	Villa Park
	Edmund Eyre (26'); Charlie Wallace (75' pen)	Report

20 March 1909	Notts County	1–1	Aston Villa	Trent Bridge
		Report	Albert Hall (23')

27 March 1909	Leicester	4–2	Aston Villa	Filbert Street
		Report	Joe Walters (53', 80')

31 March 1909	Manchester United	0–2	Aston Villa	Bank Street
		Report	Joe Walters (54'); Harry Hampton (68')

3 April 1909	Bristol City	0–0	Aston Villa	Ashton Gate
		Report

9 April 1909	Aston Villa	3–0	Sheffield United	Villa Park
	Joe Walters (14'); Edmund Eyre (35'); Joe Bache (52')	Report

10 April 1909	Aston Villa	2–4	Preston North End	Villa Park
	George Travers (36'); Charlie Wallace (52' pen)	Report

17 April 1909	Middlesbrough	1–0	Aston Villa	Ayresome Park
		Report

24 April 1909	Aston Villa	2–1	Manchester City	Villa Park
	Charlie Wallace (36' pen); Joe Walters (84')	Report

26 April 1909	Aston Villa	3–0	Newcastle	Villa Park
	Joe Bache (44'); Charlie Wallace (47', 52' pen)	Report

Source: avfchistory.co.uk

== Players ==
There were debut appearances for George Hunter, Sammy Whittaker, Alfred Gittins, Jock McKenzie, Edmund Eyre, Arthur Layton, Frank Cornan, George Travers, Len Skiller, Jack Kearns and Arthur Cartlidge.

Players making their final appearance included Peter Kyle, Jack Windmill, Joseph Wilcox, Alfred Gittins, Rowland Codling, Len Skiller, Alec Logan, Jock McKenzie, George Reeves, Walter Kimberley, George Travers and Frank Cornan.
