= Hallworth =

Hallworth is a surname. Notable people with this surname include:

- Albert Hallworth (1898–1962), British trade unionist
- Arthur Hallworth (1884–?), English football player
- Derek Hallworth, British TV director
- Jon Hallworth (born 1965), English former football player
- Rodney Hallworth (1929–1985), British journalist
- Steven Hallworth (born 1995), English former snooker player
