= Arthur Morris (footballer) =

English footballer

Personal information
- Full name: Arthur Morris
- Date of birth: 1882
- Place of birth: Market Drayton, England
- Date of death: 1945 (aged 62–63)
- Place of death: Shrewsbury, England
- Position: Inside left

Senior career*
Years	Team	Apps	(Gls)
–1906	Shrewsbury Town		
1906–1908	Birmingham	4	(2)
1908–19??	Shrewsbury Town		
- * Club domestic league appearances and goals

Arthur Morris (1882–1945) was an English professional footballer who played in the Football League for Birmingham. He played as an inside left.

Morris was born in Market Drayton, Shropshire. He played for Shrewsbury Town before joining Birmingham in 1906. Morris made his debut in the First Division on 2 March 1907, scoring a goal which secured a 1–1 draw at home to Manchester United, and played in the next game, but then lost his place to Frank Cornan. A creative player, he appeared once more in the 1906–07 season, when Cornan moved to left half to cover for the absent Jim Dougherty, and again scored to gain Birmingham a point. After appearing only once in the following season, he returned to Shrewsbury Town in 1908.

Morris died in Shrewsbury, Shropshire, in 1945.
