= Aaron Jones (footballer, born 1881) =

English footballer (1881–1954)

Personal information
- Date of birth: 1881
- Place of birth: Walsall, England
- Date of death: 1954 (aged 72–73)
- Place of death: Yorkshire, England
- Position: Forward

Senior career*
Years	Team	Apps	(Gls)
1903–1905	Barnsley	32	(16)
1905–1907	Birmingham	5	(0)
1907–1908	Notts County	22	(6)
- * Club domestic league appearances and goals

Aaron Jones (1881–1954) was an English professional footballer who made 59 appearances in the Football League playing for Barnsley, Birmingham and Notts County. He played as a forward.

Jones was born in Walsall, Staffordshire. His scoring rate of a goal every other game for Barnsley, his first professional club, prompted First Division club Birmingham to pay £170 for his services in May 1905. However, he found himself unable to dislodge the established forwards, Billy Jones, Benny Green and Arthur Mounteney, and played only five games before moving on to fellow First Division club Notts County. Jones scored six goals in 22 league games for County, his last Football League club.

Jones died in Yorkshire in 1954.
