= Sellman =

Sellman is a surname. Notable people with the surname include:

- Alexander G. Sellman (1856–1888), American chess player
- Alfred Sellman (1880–1935), English footballer
- Frank Sellman (1852–1907), American baseball player
- Sher Sellman, American politician

== See also ==
- Selman (disambiguation)
