= Fred Chaplin (footballer) =

English footballer

Personal information
- Full name: Alfred Chaplin
- Date of birth: 1879
- Place of birth: Foleshill, England
- Date of death: Unknown
- Place of death: London, England
- Position: Right half

Senior career*
Years	Team	Apps	(Gls)
- St Paul's Bible Class
- Folesworth Great Heath
1902–1903	Coventry City		
1903–1905	Small Heath	4	(0)
1905–1906	Woolwich Arsenal	0	(0)
1906–1912	Coventry City		
- * Club domestic league appearances and goals

Alfred Chaplin (1879 – after 1911), commonly known as Fred Chaplin, was an English professional footballer who played in the Football League for Small Heath.

Chaplin was born in Foleshill, Warwickshire. He played local football before joining Coventry City, then playing in the Birmingham & District League, in 1902. Chaplin's reputation as a goalscorer and his performance in a representative match between the Birmingham and Scottish Junior Football Associations earned him a contract with First Division club Small Heath. He made his debut on 16 January 1904 in a 1–1 draw away at Aston Villa, and kept his place for the next three games. Despite his goalscoring history, these four games were played in the half-back line, deputising in turn for centre-half Walter Wigmore and wing halves Harry Howard and Billy Beer. At the end of the 1904–05 season, Chaplin moved to Woolwich Arsenal, but after one season he returned to Coventry City without having appeared for the first team. He was a Coventry player when they joined the Southern League.
