= Alfred Sellman =

English footballer (1880–1935)

Personal information
- Full name: Alfred William Sellman
- Date of birth: 1880
- Place of birth: Chadsmoor, England
- Date of death: 1935 (aged 54–55)
- Place of death: Coventry, England
- Position: Centre half

Senior career*
Years	Team	Apps	(Gls)
- Bridgtown Amateurs
190?–1906	Small Heath	1	(0)
1906–1907	Leyton		
1907–190?	Workington		
1908–19??	Rugeley		
- * Club domestic league appearances and goals

Alfred William Sellman (1880–1935) was an English professional footballer who played in the Football League for Small Heath. He also played Southern League football for Leyton and appeared in the Lancashire Combination for Workington.

== Life and career ==
Sellman was born in Chadsmoor, Staffordshire, in 1880. He played local football for Bridgford Amateurs before joining First Division club Small Heath in the 1903–04 season. His performances for the reserve team earned him selection for a trial, in which he scored the opening goal, and thence for the Birmingham & District Football Association team to represent England in a junior international match against Scotland Juniors at Aston Lower Grounds, Birmingham, in April 1904. England won 2–1, and Sellman's Small Heath team-mate Charlie Tickle scored both goals.

He made his first-team debut on 29 April 1905, the last day of the season, and the club's last match before it was renamed Birmingham. He came into the side in place of Walter Wigmore, the regular centre half, and the Birmingham Gazette & Express's 'Spectator' thought that Sellman was effectively on trial, as he had had little opportunity thus far to prove himself. Despite the 1–0 defeat, he "created a very favourable impression in the centre-half position. Though somewhat ungainly, he was untiring in his efforts, and prevented the opposing forwards adopting united methods." He remained with the club until 1906, but made no more competitive appearances for the first team.

He and Birmingham team-mate Bill Bidmead signed for Leyton, newly promoted to the Southern League First Division for the 1906–07 season. Sellman joined Lancashire Combination club Workington in August 1907. He had remained on Birmingham's transfer list, and his fee was reduced to £20 in the 1908 close season. There were no takers, and in late 1908, after some time away from the game, he returned to local football in his home county with Walsall League club Rugeley: on his debut, the Lichfield Mercury reported that "the man most anxiously watched was the new centre-half, Sellman, an old first division player, and it is not going too far to say he justified expectations. He is a little stiff after his long rest, but he showed some good football, and is very useful with his head."

He had a trial with Kent County Cricket Club as a wicketkeeper.

Sellman died in Coventry in 1935.
