= Fred Chaplin =

Fred Chaplin may refer to:

- Fred Chaplin (footballer)
- Fred Chaplin (rugby league)
