= Bidmead =

Bidmead is an English surname. Notable people with this name include:

- Bill Bidmead (1882–1961), English footballer
- Christopher H. Bidmead (1941–2025), British writer and journalist
- Stephanie Bidmead (1929–1974), British stage and television actress
