= Charles Harvey =

Charles Harvey may refer to:

- Charles Harvey (scientist) (1964-), American hydrologist at MIT
- Charles Harvey (footballer) (1879–?), English footballer
- Charles Harvey (cricketer) (1837–1917), English cricketer and clergyman
- Charles Harvey (Indian Army officer) (1888–1969), officer in the British Indian Army
