= Arthur Leonard =

English footballer

Personal information
- Full name: Arthur Leonard Bamford
- Date of birth: 1879
- Place of birth: Leicester, England
- Date of death: 1950 (aged 70–71)
- Position: Inside forward

Youth career
- 1896: 17th Leicestershire Regiment

Senior career*
Years	Team	Apps	(Gls)
1897–1898	Leicester Fosse	0	(0)
1898	Rushden Town		
1899	Sheppey United		
1900	Glentoran		
1901–1904	Small Heath	68	(25)
1904	Stoke	14	(3)
1904	St Bernard's		
1905	Reading		
1906–1907	Clapton Orient	37	(7)
1907–1908	Plymouth Argyle	36	(10)
1908	Reading		
Total		155	(45)

International career
1900–1901	Irish League	3	(0)
- * Club domestic league appearances and goals

Arthur Leonard Bamford (1879–1950), known as Arthur Leonard, was an English footballer who played in the Football League for Small Heath and Stoke.

== Career ==
Leonard, then known by his original surname of Bamford, signed for Leicester Fosse in 1895, but walked out on them. After playing for Rushden Town and Sheppey United, Small Heath spotted Leonard playing for Glentoran and signed him on the spot for a fee of £120. However, representatives of Leicester recognised him as their absent player, and when questioned as to the facts, he disappeared again. Persuaded to return to Birmingham, he admitted to being Bamford, and the matter was settled by Small Heath paying Leicester a further £20 to complete the transfer. In 1902–03 he was the club's top scorer with 16 goals.

Leonard then joined Stoke in January 1904 and played 14 matches in two seasons scoring three goals. After a short spell in Scotland with St Bernard's he moved to the Southern League with Clapton Orient, Plymouth Argyle before ending his career with Reading.

While a Glentoran player, Leonard played three times for the Irish League representative team.

== Career statistics ==
Appearances and goals by club, season and competition
Club	Season	League			FA Cup		Total	
Club	Season	Division	Apps	Goals	Apps	Goals	Apps	Goals
Leicester Fosse	1897–98	Second Division	0	0	0	0	0	0
Small Heath	1901–02	First Division	20	6	0	0	20	6
Small Heath	1902–03	Second Division	32	16	1	0	33	16
Small Heath	1903–04	First Division	16	3	2	1	18	4
Small Heath	Total		68	25	3	1	71	26
Stoke	1903–04	First Division	10	3	0	0	10	3
Stoke	1904–05	First Division	4	0	0	0	4	0
Stoke	Total		14	3	0	0	14	3
Clapton Orient	1906–07	Second Division	37	7	2	0	39	7
Plymouth Argyle	1907–08	Southern League	36	10	2	1	38	11
Career total			155	45	7	2	162	47
