= Bill Bidmead =

English footballer (1882–1961)

Personal information
- Full name: William Harold Bidmead
- Date of birth: 29 October 1882
- Place of birth: Handsworth, Staffordshire, England
- Date of death: 16 March 1961 (aged 78)
- Place of death: Bethnal Green, London, England
- Height: 5 ft 8 in (1.73 m)
- Position: Full back

Senior career*
| Years | Team | Apps | (Gls) |
- Elwell's
- Stourbridge
| 190?–1902 | Walsall | | |
| 1902–1903 | Brierley Hill Alliance | | |
| 1903–1906 | Small Heath / Birmingham (Note: The Small Heath club changed its name to Birmingham F.C. ahead of the 1905–06 season.) | 3 | (0) |
| 1906–1908 | Leyton | | |
| 1908–1909 | Grimsby Town | 1 | (0) |
| 1909–1911 | Brierley Hill Alliance | | |
- * Club domestic league appearances and goals

William Harold Bidmead (29 October 1882 – 16 March 1961) was an English professional footballer who played in the Football League for Small Heath (renamed Birmingham during his time with the club) and Grimsby Town. He also played in the Midland League football for Walsall, spent two seasons with Leyton of the Southern League, and appeared for Birmingham League clubs Stourbridge and Brierley Hill Alliance.

== Life and career ==
Bidmead was born in Handsworth, Staffordshire. In 1906, his father was trainer to Stourbridge F.C.

Bidmead played football for Elwell's, and was on the books of Walsall in their Football League Second Division days, but did not play for them until the 1901–02 season, when they had dropped into the Midland League after failing to be re-elected to the Football League. He took part in the 1901–02 FA Cup run that took Walsall through five rounds of the competition to reach the last 16 for the first time in their history, in which they lost 5–0 at home to First Division club Bury.

Bidmead signed for Brierley Hill Alliance in 1902. Having played as a forward for Walsall, Brierley Hill converted him to play at full back, a position to which he appeared well suited. The Birmingham Daily Gazette of September 1903 reported that, despite a sprained wrist that needed strapping, "Bidmead was a shining light in the Alliance team. To change from the front line to left back is a far cry, but he was very safe in his new position." Within a couple of weeks of that report, and much to the displeasure of Brierley Hill supporters, he signed for Football League First Division club Small Heath for a fee of £70 and the proceeds of a benefit match.

He made his Football League debut on 10 October in a 1–0 defeat away to Bury. The Sports Argus wrote that "Bidmead was very uncertain, especially at the start, and nearly let his side go down on more than one occasion. He, however, improved as the game went on. On the whole, however, he was not a great success." Another recent signing, Frank Stokes, was fit to make his club debut at left back the following week, the team won their first match of the season, and the arrival of Jack Glover from Liverpool in January 1904 after his ban from football expired pushed Bidmead a long way down the pecking order. West Midlands football historian Tony Matthews describes Glover and Stokes as "generally rated as the best [full-back pairing] at club level anywhere in the country around the turn of the century". Bidmead played twice more for the club – by then renamed Birmingham – deputising for Stokes in two matches towards the end of the 1905–06 season; both ended in defeat.

In August 1906, when he and Birmingham team-mate Alfred Sellman signed for Leyton, newly promoted to the Southern League First Division for the 1906–07 season, the Athletic News described Bidmead as a man "who once bade fair to make a clever back". By December, he was reported as "playing a sound game" at Leyton, and he remained with the club for a second season. Towards the end of that season, he injured a knee early in a match and was unable to continue.

A few weeks later he joined Grimsby Town. The Nottingham Evening Post reported that he was "said to be strong and sure of kick and a resolute tackler", and a worthy addition to a Grimsby team anxious to retain their Football League status. The club's application for re-election was successful, and Bidmead and Sid Wheelhouse were strong in defence in the opening match of the 1908–09 Second Division season, a 3–0 win at home to Stockport County. By the next game, Bidmead was injured; he was replaced by former Newcastle United reserve Crosby Henderson, and never played for Grimsby's first team again. He returned to Brierley Hill Alliance where he finished his career in 1911.

Bidmead died in Bethnal Green, London, in 1961 at the age of 78.

== Sources ==
- Joyce, Michael (2004). Football League Players' Records 1888 to 1939. Nottingham: SoccerData. ISBN 978-1-899468-67-6.
- Matthews, Tony (1995). Birmingham City: A Complete Record. Derby: Breedon Books. ISBN 978-1-85983-010-9.
