= Thomas Jones (footballer, born 1879) =

English footballer

Personal information
- Full name: Thomas Trevellyan Jones
- Date of birth: 1879
- Place of birth: Shrewsbury, England
- Date of death: Unknown
- Position: Outside left

Senior career*
| Years | Team | Apps | (Gls) |
| 1898–190? | Wolverhampton Wanderers | 0 | (0) |
| 190?–1904 | Shrewsbury Town | | |
| 1904–1905 | Small Heath | 2 | (0) |
| 1905–19?? | Shifnal Town | | |
- * Club domestic league appearances and goals

Thomas Trevellyan Jones (1879 – after 1905) was an English footballer who made two appearances in the Football League playing for Small Heath. He played as an outside left.

Jones was born in Shrewsbury, Shropshire. He signed for Wolverhampton Wanderers, initially as an amateur, in 1898 and spent several years with the club, but never played for them in the Football League. A spell with Shrewsbury Town preceded his joining Small Heath of the Football League First Division in 1904. He played three times during the 1904–05 season, twice in the League and once in the FA Cup, as a replacement for Oakey Field, but was out of his depth at that level, and returned to non-league football with Shifnal Town in 1905.
