= George Moore (footballer) =

English footballer

Personal information
- Date of birth: 1884
- Place of birth: Coventry, England
- Date of death: Unknown
- Position: Inside forward

Senior career*
Years	Team	Apps	(Gls)
- Nuneaton Borough
1908–1909	Birmingham	3	(1)
1909–19??	Leamington Town		
- * Club domestic league appearances and goals

George S. Moore (1884 – after 1908) was an English professional footballer who played in the Football League for Birmingham. He played as an inside forward.

Moore was born in Coventry, Warwickshire. He played for Nuneaton Borough before joining Birmingham of the First Division in 1908. He made his debut in the last game of the 1907–08 season, with the team already relegated, in a 4–0 defeat at home to Bristol City. He played twice more in the next season before returning to local football with Leamington Town in 1909.
