= Roly Harper =

English footballer

Personal information
- Full name: Rowland Richard George Harper
- Date of birth: April 1881
- Place of birth: Lichfield, England
- Date of death: August 1949 (aged 68)
- Place of death: Birmingham, England
- Position: Outside right

Senior career*
| Years | Team | Apps | (Gls) |
- Walsall Wood
| 1904–1907 | Small Heath / Birmingham (Note: Small Heath was renamed Birmingham ahead of the 1905–06 season.) | 22 | (1) |
| 1907 | Burton United | 0 | (0) |
| 1907–1908 | Aston Villa | 2 | (0) |
| 1908–1910 | Notts County | 10 | (1) |
| 1910–19?? | Mansfield Invicta | | |
- * Club domestic league appearances and goals

Rowland Richard George Harper (April 1881 – August 1949) was an English professional footballer who made 34 appearances in the First Division of the Football League playing for Birmingham, Aston Villa and Notts County.

Harper was born in Lichfield, Staffordshire. He began his football career with Walsall Wood before joining Small Heath of the Football League First Division in 1904. He made his debut for the club, by then renamed Birmingham, on 16 December 1905, scoring in a 5–0 win at home to Nottingham Forest, and played fairly regularly for the rest of that season, but lost his place to Charlie Tickle when the latter recovered from injury. Towards the end of the 1906–07 season he moved on to Burton United, but never played for the league team, and left for Aston Villa when Burton failed to gain re-election to the Football League. Harper played only twice for Villa before being sold together with Jimmy Cantrell to Notts County in March 1908. After making only ten league appearances in two seasons he dropped into non-league football with Mansfield Invicta. Harper died in Birmingham in August 1949 at the age of 68.
