= George Anderson (footballer, born 1879) =

English footballer

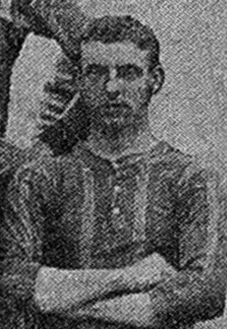
- Anderson with Brentford 1910

Personal information
- Full name: George Edward Anderson
- Date of birth: 29 November 1879
- Place of birth: Sunderland, England
- Date of death: 1962 (aged 82–83)
- Place of death: Sunderland, England
- Height: 5 ft 8 in (1.73 m)
- Position: Outside left

Senior career*
Years	Team	Apps	(Gls)
1903–1904	Sunderland Albion		
1904–1905	Sunderland Royal Rovers		
1905–1909	Birmingham	74	(10)
1909–1912	Brentford	82	(5)
- * Club domestic league appearances and goals

George Edward Anderson (29 November 1879 – 1962), sometimes known as Teddy Anderson, was an English professional footballer who played as an outside left in the Football League for Birmingham. He also played in the Southern League for Brentford.

== Personal life ==
Anderson later worked as an engineer for a Glaholm and Robson Ltd, a Sunderland-based company which made colliery equipment. He retired in 1953, after 39 years with the company. His wife, Mary (née Fullerd), died in 1950.

== Career statistics ==
Appearances and goals by club, season and competition
Club	Season	League			FA Cup		Total	
Club	Season	Division	Apps	Goals	Apps	Goals	Apps	Goals
Birmingham	1905–06	First Division	23	3	5	0	28	3
Birmingham	1906–07	First Division	31	5	1	0	32	5
Birmingham	1907–08	First Division	8	1	0	0	8	1
Birmingham	1908–09	Second Division	12	1	1	0	13	1
Birmingham	Total		74	10	7	0	81	10
Brentford	1909–10	Southern League First Division	33	3	2	0	35	3
Brentford	1910–11	Southern League First Division	29	1	1	0	30	1
Brentford	1911–12	Southern League First Division	20	1	3	0	23	1
Brentford	Total		82	5	6	0	88	5
Career total			156	15	13	0	169	15
