= Ezra Holmes =

English footballer

Personal information
- Date of birth: 26 October 1885
- Place of birth: Wombwell, Yorkshire, England
- Date of death: 1 May 1921 (aged 35)
- Place of death: Belper, Derbyshire, England
- Position: Centre forward

Senior career*
Years	Team	Apps	(Gls)
1906–1907	Gainsborough Trinity	41	(12)
1907–1908	Birmingham	2	(0)
1908–19??	Stamford Town		
- * Club domestic league appearances and goals

Ezra Holmes (26 October 1885 – 1 May 1921) was an English professional footballer who scored 12 goals in 43 appearances in the Football League playing for Gainsborough Trinity and Birmingham.

Holmes was born in Wombwell, Yorkshire. A small man who played as a centre forward, his performances for Gainsborough in the Second Division led Birmingham to pay the large fee of £400 for his services in November 1907. He went straight into the starting eleven, played two first-team games, and four months later dropped into non-league football with Stamford Town.
