= John Hirons =

English footballer

Personal information
- Date of birth: October 1876
- Place of birth: Birmingham, England
- Date of death: Unknown
- Positions: Outside left; left half

Senior career*
Years	Team	Apps	(Gls)
- Witton Shell Depot
- Erdington
- Pleck Ramblers
1901–1903	Walsall		
1903–1906	Small Heath	5	(0)
1906–19??	Walsall		
- * Club domestic league appearances and goals

John W. Hirons (1876 – after 1905) was an English professional footballer who played in the Football League for Small Heath.

Hirons was born in the Erdington district of Birmingham. He played local football before moving up to the Midland League with Walsall and in February 1903 joined Small Heath of the Second Division. He was signed as cover for regular winger Oakey Field, and made his debut on 21 February 1903 deputising for Field in a game at Burton United which Small Heath won 1–0. Hirons played twice more in the 1902–03 season, and played a further two games the following year in the First Division. Though a hard worker, it was felt he did not have the ability for top-level football, and he returned to Walsall in 1906.
