= Thomas Thompson (footballer) =

English footballer

Personal information
- Full name: Thomas Thompson
- Date of birth: 1879
- Place of birth: Smethwick, England
- Date of death: 1939 (aged 59–60)
- Place of death: Birmingham, England
- Position: Outside left

Senior career*
Years	Team	Apps	(Gls)
- Nettlefolds
1902–1903	Small Heath	1	(0)
1903–19??	Oldbury Town		
- * Club domestic league appearances and goals

Thomas Thompson (1879–1939) was an English professional footballer who played in the Football League for Small Heath.

Thompson was born in Smethwick, Staffordshire. He was playing for Nettlefolds' works team when Small Heath signed him, attracted by his pace on the left wing. His debut, on 24 January 1903 in a Second Division game away at Preston North End which Small Heath lost 2–1, was his only first-team appearance, and he returned that same year to non-league football with Oldbury Town.

He died in Birmingham in 1939.
