= Charles Harvey (footballer) =

English footballer

Personal information
- Date of birth: 1879
- Place of birth: Birmingham, England
- Date of death: Unknown
- Position: Outside right

Senior career*
Years	Team	Apps	(Gls)
- St Philip's YMCA
1904–1907	Small Heath / Birmingham (Note: Small Heath was renamed Birmingham ahead of the 1905–06 season.)	2	(0)
1907–1909	Leek		
1909–19??	Shrewsbury Town		
- * Club domestic league appearances and goals

Charles Harvey (1879 – after 1908) was an English footballer who played in the Football League for Small Heath, which was renamed Birmingham during his time at the club.

Born in the Small Heath district of Birmingham, Harvey was a sergeant in the Army stationed at Lichfield when Small Heath signed him. He made his debut in the First Division on 25 March 1905, deputising for Charlie Tickle at outside right in a home game against Sunderland which finished as a 1–1 draw, and played once more for the first team, two years later, before moving into Non-League football with Leek and then with Shrewsbury Town.
