= Frank Stokes (footballer) =

English footballer

Personal information
- Date of birth: 7 June 1881
- Place of birth: Burslem, England
- Date of death: 1945 (aged 63–64)
- Position: Full back

Youth career
- Burslem Park

Senior career*
Years	Team	Apps	(Gls)
1898–1901	Burslem Port Vale	67	(0)
1901–1903	Reading		
1903–1910	Small Heath / Birmingham (Note: Small Heath was renamed Birmingham ahead of the 1905–06 season.)	199	(1)
–	Worcester City		
- * Club domestic league appearances and goals

Frank Stokes (7 June 1881 – 1945) was an English professional footballer who played as a full back. He made more than 250 appearances in the Football League playing for Burslem Port Vale and Small Heath / Birmingham between 1898 and 1910. In between these two spells, he spent 1901 to 1903 at Reading and helped the club to finish second in the Southern League in the 1902–03 season. He played in several England trials but was never selected.

== Career ==
=== Burslem Port Vale ===
Stokes was born in Burslem, Staffordshire. He joined Burslem Port Vale from local side Burslem Park in October 1898. He made his debut on 4 March 1899 in a 4–1 win over Luton Town at the Athletic Ground, and went on to play a further two Second Division games in the 1898–99 season. He became a first-team regular in the 1899–1900 campaign, featuring in 32 league and 10 cup games and missing just two league games all season long, he played more matches than any other Vale player. In the 1900–01 season, he again played 32 league games, with just two absences throughout the season. He signed for Southern League club Reading in the summer of 1901.

=== Reading ===
The "Royals" posted a fifth-place finish in 1901–02, before finishing as runners-up to Southampton in 1902–03. He then left Elm Park and returned to the Midlands and the Football League in 1903 to sign for Small Heath (later renamed Birmingham). The Daily Express reported that

Reading lose a fine back in Stokes, and his place will be hard to fill. Small Heath have secured him, and he should be of immense service to them in their First League matches.

=== Small Heath ===
A muscular yet mobile defender, he formed an excellent full-back pairing with Jack Glover. He went straight into the first-team and played 26 First Division and four FA Cup games in 1903–04. He was an ever-present in the 35 games 1904–05 season and featured 37 times in the 1905–06 campaign; the club changed its name to Birmingham F.C. in 1905. He played 38 of the club's 39 games in the 1906–07 season and scored his first goal at Coventry Road on 6 October, in a 2–0 win over Notts County. In the 1907–08 relegation season, the first full season to be played at St Andrew's, he made 29 appearances. He featured in 23 Second Division games in the 1908–09 season and played 21 times in the 1909–10 campaign. In his seven years at the club, he made 213 appearances in all competitions before a serious knee injury forced his retirement.

== Career statistics ==
Appearances and goals by club, season and competition
Club	Season	League			FA Cup		Total	
Club	Season	Division	Apps	Goals	Apps	Goals	Apps	Goals
Burslem Port Vale	1898–99	Second Division	3	0	0	0	3	0
Burslem Port Vale	1899–1900	Second Division	32	0	4	0	36	0
Burslem Port Vale	1900–01	Second Division	32	0	1	0	33	0
Burslem Port Vale	Total		67	0	5	0	72	0
Birmingham	1903–04	First Division	26	0	4	0	30	0
Birmingham	1904–05	First Division	34	0	1	0	35	0
Birmingham	1905–06	First Division	31	0	6	0	37	0
Birmingham	1906–07	First Division	37	1	1	0	38	1
Birmingham	1907–08	First Division	28	0	1	0	29	0
Birmingham	1908–09	First Division	23	0	0	0	23	0
Birmingham	1909–10	First Division	20	0	1	0	21	0
Birmingham	Total		199	1	14	0	213	1
