= John Edmondson (footballer) =

English footballer

Personal information
- Full name: John Henry Edmondson
- Date of birth: 1882
- Place of birth: Accrington, England
- Position: Goalkeeper

Senior career*
Years	Team	Apps	(Gls)
1901–1902	Accrington Stanley		
1902–1907	Manchester City	38	(0)
1907–1914	Bolton Wanderers	239	(0)
Total		277	(0)
- * Club domestic league appearances and goals

John Edmondson (1882–unknown) was an English footballer who played in the Football League for Bolton Wanderers and Manchester City.
