= Arthur Harrison (English footballer) =

English footballer

Personal information
- Full name: Arthur Harrison
- Date of birth: September 1878
- Place of birth: Birmingham, England
- Date of death: Unknown
- Position: Outside right

Senior career*
Years	Team	Apps	(Gls)
- Linton
1902–1903	Small Heath	4	(3)
1903–19??	Brownhills Athletic		
- * Club domestic league appearances and goals

Arthur Harrison (September 1878 – after 1902) was an English professional footballer who played in the Football League for Small Heath.

Harrison was born in the Stirchley district of Birmingham. He went to school in Cotteridge and played football for Linton before joining Small Heath of the Second Division in 1902. He made his debut on 20 December 1902, scoring twice in a 3–1 win at home to Lincoln City, but had the thankless task of trying to dislodge England international Charlie Athersmith from the outside-right position – Harrison's debut was the first game Athersmith had missed since September 1901 – and he played only three more games that season before returning to local football with Brownhills Athletic.
