= Arthur Hallworth =

English footballer

Personal information
- Full name: Arthur Hallworth
- Date of birth: 1884
- Place of birth: Stoke-upon-Trent, England
- Date of death: Unknown
- Position: Left half

Senior career*
Years	Team	Apps	(Gls)
- Twyford Youth Club
1906–1907	Birmingham	1	(0)
1907–19??	Leek Alexandra		
–	Barlaston Manor		
- * Club domestic league appearances and goals

Arthur Hallworth (1884 – after 1906) was an English professional footballer who played in the First Division of the Football League for Birmingham.

Hallworth was born in Stoke-upon-Trent, Staffordshire, and played football as a left half for Twyford Youth Club before joining Birmingham in 1906 as cover at half back. He played once for the club in the Football League, replacing the injured Jim Dougherty for a First Division game at home to Stoke on 3 November 1906 which Birmingham won 2–1. Despite Dougherty's continued absence, Hallworth was not chosen again, and at the end of the 1906–07 season he returned to local football in Staffordshire with Leek Alexandra and then with Barlaston Manor.
