= Jack Smith (footballer, born 1882) =

English footballer, born 1882

Personal information
- Full name: John Smith
- Date of birth: 1882
- Place of birth: Wednesfield, England
- Date of death: Unknown
- Position: Forward

Senior career*
Years	Team	Apps	(Gls)
- Cannock
- Stafford Road
1902–1906	Wolverhampton Wanderers	104	(38)
1906–1907	Birmingham	6	(1)
1907–1908	Bristol Rovers	31	(10)
1908–1909	Norwich City		
1909–1911	Luton Town		
1911–1912	Millwall		
1912–19??	Coventry City		
- * Club domestic league appearances and goals

John Smith (1882 – after 1911) was an English professional footballer who scored 39 goals in 110 appearances in First Division of the Football League playing for Wolverhampton Wanderers and Birmingham. He played as a forward.

Smith was born in Wednesfield, Staffordshire, and played for Cannock and for Stafford Road before joining Wolverhampton Wanderers in 1906. He scored twice on his debut in the Football League on the opening day of the 1902–03 season, in a 3–0 home win against Derby County. He continued to score at a respectable rate, and two seasons later was Wolves' leading scorer jointly with Billy Wooldridge. In April 1906, with Wolves' relegation from the First Division confirmed, Smith joined fellow First Division club Birmingham; they still had three games left to play, in which he contributed one goal. However, as a short, stocky man he did not fit in with Birmingham's style of play, and less than a year later he moved on, to Southern League club Bristol Rovers. In his only season with Rovers he scored 10 goals in 31 Southern League games, and then embarked on a tour of the Southern League, playing in turn for Norwich City, Luton Town, Millwall and Coventry City.
