= Percy Gooch =

English footballer

Personal information
- Full name: Percival George Gooch
- Date of birth: 1 September 1882
- Place of birth: Lowestoft, England
- Date of death: 22 June 1956 (aged 73)
- Place of death: Lothingland, England
- Position: Forward

Senior career*
Years	Team	Apps	(Gls)
1901–1903	Lowestoft Town		
1903–1907	Norwich City		
1907–1908	Birmingham	4	(1)
1908–1909	Notts County	3	(1)
1909–1910	Norwich City		
- * Club domestic league appearances and goals

Percival George Gooch (1 September 1882 – 22 June 1956) was an English professional footballer who played in the Football League for Birmingham and Notts County.

Gooch was born in Lowestoft, Suffolk. He began his career in local football in the Lowestoft area before joining the recently formed Norwich City, then playing in the Norfolk and Suffolk League, in 1903. When Norwich were elected to the Southern League in 1905, Gooch, a tall forward, turned professional, and remained with the club a further 18 months before moving to the Football League with Birmingham. He made his debut in the First Division on 9 March 1907 in a 3–0 defeat at Stoke, and scored in his second game some three weeks later, but never settled. In March 1908 he joined fellow First Division club Notts County, but played only three league games in 18 months, and returned home to East Anglia for another season with Norwich City. In his two spells with the club he scored 36 goals in all competitions.

Gooch died in Lothingland, Suffolk, in 1956 at the age of 73.
