= John Kearns (footballer) =

English footballer

Personal information
- Full name: John Henry Kearns
- Date of birth: April 1880
- Place of birth: Nuneaton, England
- Date of death: January 14, 1949 (aged 68)
- Place of death: Walsall, England
- Height: 5 ft 9 1/2 in (1.77 m)
- Position: Full back

Senior career*
| Years | Team | Apps | (Gls) |
- Brownhills Albion
- Hartshill Unity
| 1903–1906 | Coventry City | | |
| 1906–1909 | Birmingham | 61 | (1) |
| 1909–1912 | Aston Villa | 39 | (0) |
| 1912–1915 | Bristol City | 93 | (1) |
- * Club domestic league appearances and goals

John Henry Kearns (April 1880 – January 1949), also known as Jack Kearns, was an English professional footballer who played as a full back.

Kearns was born in Nuneaton, Warwickshire, in April 1880. He made nearly 200 appearances in the Football League playing for Birmingham, Aston Villa and Bristol City. While at Birmingham he understudied Frank Stokes and Jack Glover, but was first choice at Bristol City, for whom he played nearly 100 league games. Kearns died in Walsall, Staffordshire, in January 1949, at the age of 68.
