= Harold Wassell =

English footballer

Harry Wassell
Personal information
- Date of birth: 21 September 1879
- Place of birth: Stourbridge, England
- Date of death: March 1951 (aged 71)
- Place of death: Dudley, England
- Position: Full back

Senior career*
Years	Team	Apps	(Gls)
–	Brierley Hill Alliance		
1902–1904	Small Heath	56	(0)
1904–1905	Bristol Rovers		
1905–1906	Queens Park Rangers	3	(0)
- * Club domestic league appearances and goals

Harold (Harry) Wassell (21 September 1879 – March 1951) was an English professional footballer born in Amblecote, Stourbridge, Worcestershire, who played as a full back. He made 56 appearances in the Football League playing for Small Heath, contributing to their promotion as Second Division runners-up in the 1902–03 season. He also played for Bristol Rovers and Queens Park Rangers in the Southern League.

Harold was born and raised in Amblecote Road near Stourbridge. His father was Richard Wassell, a miner, and his mother was Harriet Dutton. He was known as Harry to his family.

Harold married Hagar Round in 1921 in Dudley (Hagar’s sister, Lucy -Blanche, was married to Edwin Alfred Holden and together they founded, Holden’s Brewery). Harold and Hagar had two children, Harry and Ronald.

After retiring from football Harold worked as a railway traffic inspector at the Round Oak Steelworks in Brierley Hill. He died in Burton Road Hospital, Dudley.
