= Freddie Wilcox =

English footballer

Personal information
- Full name: Frederick James Wilcox (Note: Although sources including Matthews (1995), p. 134 and the English National Football Archive give his middle name as Jeremiah, Wilcox signed his full name as Frederick James Wilcox on his 1911 census form.)
- Date of birth: 26 December 1882
- Place of birth: Bristol, England
- Date of death: 5 April 1959 (aged 76)
- Place of death: Smethwick, England
- Height: 5 ft 7 in (1.70 m)
- Positions: Inside left; half back

Senior career*
Years	Team	Apps	(Gls)
–1901	Glendale		
1901–1903	Bristol Rovers	48	(18)
1903–1906	Small Heath / Birmingham (Note: Small Heath was renamed Birmingham ahead of the 1905–06 season.)	78	(32)
1906–1910	Middlesbrough	106	(22)
1911–191?	Birmingham	0	(0)
- * Club domestic league appearances and goals

Frederick James Wilcox (26 December 1882 – 5 April 1959) was an English professional footballer who made 184 appearances in the Football League, most of which were in the First Division, with Small Heath / Birmingham (renamed during his first spell at the club) and Middlesbrough.

== Life and career ==
Wilcox was born in Bristol and began his senior career with Southern League club Bristol Rovers in 1901. His dribbling and goalscoring soon attracted attention, and in March 1903 he joined Football League Second Division club Small Heath for a fee of £125 plus the proceeds of a friendly match between the clubs. In the six matches remaining, he scored seven goals – two on debut against Blackpool, four in a 12–0 defeat of Doncaster Rovers that remains the club's record victory, and the winner against Manchester United in the last match of the campaign – and Small Heath were promoted to the First Division as Second Division runners-up.

The following season he was joint leading scorer in league matches, though with only eight goals, as the team established itself at the higher level. In 1904–05 he played and scored for The North against The South in an England international trial, but the selectors preferred Stanley Harris at inside left. Wilcox and partner Oakey Field gained a reputation as the "best left wing in the First League" of that season, but both were injured towards the end of the campaign as Small Heath, who had been challenging for the title, were only able to finish seventh. Wilcox still managed twelve goals, and a further five in 1905–06 as he again lost time to injury and to a reported disagreement with the club.

In March 1906, Wilcox was one of three highly rated players – England internationalsSteve Bloomer and Billy Brawn being the others – who were brought to Middlesbrough in the hope of helping the struggling team avoid relegation from the First Division. Despite the gloomy prognostications of the Observer, they did retain their top-flight status. In 1906–07 Wilcox contributed twelve league goals as Middlesbrough finished 11th and a further five the following season in a 6th-place finish. In the later stages of his time at Middlesbrough, he was converted to play at half back, and was reported a great success at either centre half or left half. He suffered a knee injury during a match in March 1909 that effectively put an end to his career. He appeared once more for Middlesbrough, in October.

Wilcox rejoined Birmingham in January 1911, and the 1911 census, taken some two months later, recorded his occupation as professional footballer for Birmingham F.C., but he made no first-team appearances. The 1939 Register lists him as a stacker in a brewery stores, living with his wife, Annie, in Woodlands Street, Smethwick, where he died in 1959.
