= George Southall (footballer) =

English footballer

Personal information
- Full name: George Southall
- Date of birth: 1880
- Place of birth: Quarry Bank, England
- Date of death: Unknown
- Position: Outside left

Senior career*
Years	Team	Apps	(Gls)
- Quarry Bank Celtic
- Halesowen Royal
- Redditch Excelsior
- Stourbridge
1905–1907	Birmingham	14	(0)
1907–19??	Halesowen		
- Dudley Town
- Lye Town
- * Club domestic league appearances and goals

George Southall (1880 – after 1907) was an English professional footballer who played in the Football League for Birmingham.

Southall was born in Quarry Bank, which was then in Staffordshire. He began his football career in local football, and gained a reputation as both a goalscorer and a creator of chances while with Stourbridge. He joined Birmingham in December 1905, and made his debut in the First Division on 7 April 1906 in a goalless draw at Derby County. Though given a decent run of games, he was unable to perform at his best, so he returned to non-league football where he was again successful.
