= Edmund Eyre =

English footballer

Personal information
- Full name: Edmund Eyre
- Date of birth: 23 December 1882
- Place of birth: Worksop, England
- Date of death: 1943 (aged 61)
- Place of death: Worksop, England
- Height: 5 ft 7 in (1.70 m)
- Position: Outside left

Senior career*
Years	Team	Apps	(Gls)
- Worksop West End
- Worksop Town
- Rotherham Town
1907–1908	Birmingham	48	(12)
1908–1911	Aston Villa	44	(8)
1911–1914	Middlesbrough	63	(13)
1914–1919	Birmingham	29	(2)
- * Club domestic league appearances and goals

Edmund Eyre (23 December 1882 – 1943), also known by the nickname of Ninty Eyre, was an English professional footballer who played as an outside left. He spent much of his playing career in the First Division of the Football League with Birmingham, Aston Villa and Middlesbrough.

== Playing career ==
Eyre was born in Worksop, Nottinghamshire, England. He was a pacy winger and good crosser of the ball who scored freely for home-town clubs Worksop West End and Midland League Worksop Town and then for Rotherham Town, also in the Midland League. Eyre moved into the Football League with Birmingham in 1907, finishing his first full season as leading scorer, though with only nine goals for a struggling side who were relegated from the First Division. After scoring four goals in 15 games in the Second Division, he returned to the top flight with Aston Villa. In 1909–10 he contributed to Aston Villa's sixth Football League championship. The following year he moved on to Middlesbrough, returning to Birmingham in April 1914. He retired from football in 1919, and died in Worksop in 1972 aged 89.

== Honours ==
Aston Villa

- Football League First Division champions: 1909–10
