= Arthur Mounteney =

English cricketer and footballer

Personal information
- Date of birth: 11 February 1883
- Place of birth: Loughborough, Leicestershire, England
- Date of death: 1 June 1933 (aged 50)
- Place of death: Leicester, England
- Position: Inside forward

Youth career
- Leicester Imperial

Senior career*
Years	Team	Apps	(Gls)
1903–1905	Leicester Fosse	30	(11)
1905–1909	Birmingham	91	(29)
1909–1911	Preston North End	52	(11)
1911–1912	Grimsby Town	45	(17)
1912–1914	Portsmouth		
1914–1915	Hinckley Athletic		
- * Club domestic league appearances and goals

Arthur Mounteney (11 February 1883 – 1 June 1933) was an English professional footballer and cricketer.

Mounteney was born in Loughborough, Leicestershire. He played as an inside forward for Leicester Fosse, Birmingham, Preston North End and Grimsby Town in the Football League. He played nearly 100 matches for Birmingham, and scored the club's last goal at their Muntz Street ground before they moved to St Andrew's in December 1906.

Mounteney played as a right-handed batsman and occasional bowler for Leicestershire County Cricket Club from 1911 to 1924, scoring 5306 runs, including six centuries, at an average of 20.80.

He died in Leicester aged 50.
