= Harry Howard (footballer, born 1871) =

English footballer

Personal information
- Full name: Henry Howard
- Date of birth: 1875
- Place of birth: Blackerhill, Yorkshire, England
- Date of death: 1957 (aged 81–82)
- Position: Wing half

Senior career*
Years	Team	Apps	(Gls)
1895–1900	Sheffield United	48	(3)
1902–1906	Small Heath / Birmingham (Note: Small Heath was renamed Birmingham ahead of the 1905–06 season.)	48	(1)
1906–19??	Wisbech Town		
- * Club domestic league appearances and goals

Henry Howard (1875 – 1957) was an English professional footballer who played as a wing half. Born in Rotherham, he had trials with Rotherham Town and Sheffield Wednesday before joining Sheffield United, for whom he made 48 appearances in the Football League. He went on to play 51 games in all competitions for Small Heath.

Harry was born in 1875 in Blackerhill, Yorkshire. He is the son of Joseph Howard and Hannah Hanson.

Harry's birth was registered in the Jan-Feb-Mar quarter of 1875 in the Barnsley Union district.[4]

Henry (age 29), son of Joseph Howard, married Ada Hollings (age 27), child of Israel Hollings, on 12 July 1904 in Worsbrough, Yorkshire (West Riding), England.

Harry's death (age 81) was registered in the Jan-Feb-Mar quarter of 1957 in the Barnsley district.
