= Benny Green (footballer) =

English footballer (1883–1917)

Personal information
- Full name: Benjamin Haigh Green
- Date of birth: 23 February 1883
- Place of birth: Penistone, England
- Date of death: 26 April 1917 (aged 34)
- Place of death: Arras area, France
- Position: Inside forward

Youth career
- Penistone Rising Star
- Penistone

Senior career*
Years	Team	Apps	(Gls)
1901–1903	Barnsley	46	(18)
1903–1909	Small Heath / Birmingham (Note: Small Heath was renamed Birmingham ahead of the 1905–06 season.)	185	(43)
1909–1911	Burnley	71	(29)
1911–1913	Preston North End	73	(23)
1913–1915	Blackpool	31	(4)
Total		360	(99)
- * Club domestic league appearances and goals

Benjamin Haigh Green (23 February 1883 – 26 April 1917) was an English professional footballer who played as an inside forward. He scored 117 goals from 406 matches in the Football League playing for Barnsley, Small Heath (renamed Birmingham in 1905), Burnley, Preston North End and Blackpool.

He made nearly 200 appearances for Small Heath / Birmingham in all competitions, and scored the first goal at the club's new ground, St Andrew's, on 29 December 1906, three days after the official opening, for which he was rewarded with a piano.

Green was born in Penistone, Yorkshire, and was killed in action in France in 1917, where he was serving as a private with the King's Own (Royal Lancaster Regiment). His sister Lucy captained the Huddersfield Atalanta Ladies F.C. in the 1920s.
