= Ambrose Hartwell =

English footballer (1879–1940)

Personal information
- Full name: Ambrose Francis George Broderic Hartwell
- Date of birth: 28 June 1879
- Place of birth: Exeter, England
- Date of death: 19 December 1940 (aged 61)
- Place of death: Erdington, Birmingham, England
- Position: Centre half

Senior career*
Years	Team	Apps	(Gls)
- Budleigh Town
- Erdington
- Feltham
- Redditch Excelsior
- Erdington
1901–1908	Small Heath / Birmingham (Note: Small Heath was renamed Birmingham ahead of the 1905–06 season.)	50	(1)
1908–1909	Bradford Park Avenue	21	(2)
1909–1911	Queens Park Rangers	57	(4)
1911–	Kidderminster Harriers		
- Shrewsbury Town
- * Club domestic league appearances and goals

Ambrose Francis George Broderic Hartwell (28 June 1879 – 19 December 1940) was an English professional footballer who played as a centre half for Small Heath (later renamed Birmingham) and Bradford Park Avenue in the Football League. He also played in the Southern League for Queens Park Rangers, and in non-league football for a variety of clubs. He died on 19 December 1940 at Erdington, Birmingham.
