= Frank Cornan =

English footballer

Personal information
- Full name: Francis Cornan
- Date of birth: 5 May 1880
- Place of birth: Sunderland, England
- Date of death: 31 May 1971 (aged 91)
- Place of death: Halifax, England
- Positions: Inside left; left half

Youth career
- Sunderland Black Watch
- Willington

Senior career*
Years	Team	Apps	(Gls)
1902–1905	Barnsley	88	(18)
1905–1908	Birmingham	54	(1)
1908–1909	Aston Villa	16	(0)
1909	Spennymoor United		
1909–1910	Barnsley	0	(0)
1910–1911	Nelson		
1911–1912	Exeter City		
1912–1915	Barnsley	7	(0)
- * Club domestic league appearances and goals

Francis Cornan (5 May 1880 – 31 May 1971) was an English professional footballer born in Sunderland, who played as an inside left or left half. He made 165 appearances in the Football League playing for Barnsley (in three separate spells), Birmingham and Aston Villa. He died in Halifax, West Yorkshire, aged 91.
