= Oakey Field =

English footballer

- Field while with Sheffield United in 1901.

Personal information
- Full name: Charles William Frederick Field
- Date of birth: 11 December 1878
- Place of birth: Hanwell, England
- Date of death: 29 October 1949 (aged 70)
- Place of death: Hayes, England
- Positions: Inside left; outside left

Senior career*
Years	Team	Apps	(Gls)
1894–1895	Hanwell		
1895–1896	Royal Ordnance Factories		
1896–1898	Brentford	17	(18)
1898–1902	Sheffield United	54	(17)
1902–1906	Small Heath / Birmingham (Note: Small Heath was renamed Birmingham ahead of the 1905–06 season.)	86	(14)
1907–1908	Brentford	0	(0)
- * Club domestic league appearances and goals

Charles William Frederick Field (11 December 1878 – 29 October 1949), known as Oakey Field, was an English professional footballer who played as an inside left or outside left for Sheffield United and Small Heath (later renamed Birmingham) in the Football League.

== Playing career ==
Born in Hanwell, which is now in the London Borough of Ealing, Field played for Royal Ordnance Factories in the Southern League and for Brentford in the London League. He scored a hat-trick on his Brentford debut and helped the club gain promotion from Division Two in 1897 followed by runners-up spot in Division One the next season. He then signed for reigning Football League champions Sheffield United, for whom he played in the 1901 FA Cup Final, losing to Tottenham Hotspur, then of the Southern League, after a replay. In January 1902, together with teammate Billy Beer, Field joined Small Heath. Unable to prevent their relegation from the First Division that season, he contributed to their immediate promotion in 1902–03 as runners-up. He retired from football in 1906 following persistent injuries. He returned to Brentford in November 1907 to play for the reserves and retired at the end of the 1907–08 season, later setting up in business in the town.

== Honours ==
Brentford

- London League Division Two runners-up: 1896–97
- London League Division One runners-up: 1897–98
- London Senior Cup: 1897–98
- Middlesex Senior Cup: 1897–98

Sheffield United

- FA Cup runners-up: 1900–01

Small Heath

- Football League Second Division runners-up: 1902–03
