= Nat Robinson =

English footballer

Personal information
- Full name: Arthur Charles Robinson
- Date of birth: 28 February 1878
- Place of birth: Coventry, England
- Date of death: 15 May 1929 (aged 51)
- Place of death: Coventry, England
- Position: Goalkeeper

Senior career*
| Years | Team | Apps | (Gls) |
- Allesley
- Coventry Stars
- Singer's
| 1898–1908 | Small Heath / Birmingham (Note: Small Heath was renamed Birmingham ahead of the 1905–06 season.) | 283 | (0) |
| 1908–1910 | Chelsea | 3 | (0) |
| 1910–19?? | Coventry City | | |
- * Club domestic league appearances and goals

Arthur Charles "Nat" Robinson (28 February 1878 – 15 May 1929) was an English professional footballer who played as a goalkeeper for Small Heath / Birmingham, Chelsea and Coventry City. He also appeared for the Football League XI in 1906–07 against the Irish League and Scottish League representative sides, and played in two England trials. He made more than 300 appearances for Small Heath in all competitions. After retiring from playing he ran a pub in his native Coventry, and died in that city aged 51.

== Honours ==
Small Heath

- Second Division runners-up: 1900–01, 1902–03
