= John Glover (footballer) =

English footballer (1876–1955)

Personal information
- Full name: John William Glover
- Date of birth: 28 October 1876
- Place of birth: West Bromwich, England
- Date of death: 20 April 1955 (aged 78)
- Place of death: Dudley, England
- Position: Right back

Youth career
- Years: Team
- West Bromwich Unity
- Great Bridge Unity
- Halesowen
- Rudge-Whitworth
1897–1899	Blackburn Rovers	25	(0)
1899–1900	New Brompton		
1900–1903	Liverpool	59	(0)
1904–1908	Small Heath / Birmingham (Note: Small Heath was renamed Birmingham ahead of the 1905–06 season.)	116	(2)
1908–1910	Brierley Hill Alliance		

John William Glover (28 October 1876 – 20 April 1955) was an English professional footballer who played as a right back.

Born in West Bromwich, Staffordshire, Glover made 200 appearances in the First Division for Blackburn Rovers (who signed him from the Rudge-Whitworth team in Coventry), Liverpool and Small Heath (later Birmingham), and in the 1900–01 season won the league championship with Liverpool. He and two other Liverpool players were banned from football for six months in 1903 for "accepting illegal financial inducements" from Southern League club Portsmouth to sign for them. When the ban ended, he signed for Small Heath, where he developed as a strong-tackling defender and formed an excellent full-back pairing with Frank Stokes.

Glover played for the Football League representative team and played in England trials, but was not selected for the national team. After retiring from football he kept a public house in Dudley, Worcestershire, and also represented Shropshire at bowls. He died in Dudley at the age of 78.

== Honours ==
Liverpool

- Football League First Division champions 1900–01.
