= Billy Jones (footballer, born 1881) =

English footballer (1881-1948)

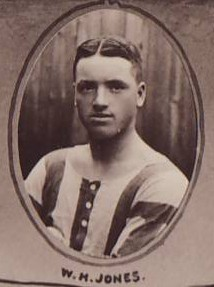
- Pictured in 1910

Personal information
- Full name: William Henry Jones
- Date of birth: 24 March 1881
- Place of birth: Tipton, England
- Date of death: 15 March 1948 (aged 66)
- Place of death: Hove, England
- Height: 5 ft 5 in (1.65 m)
- Position: Centre forward

Senior career*
Years	Team	Apps	(Gls)
–	Smethwick Town		
1899–1901	Halesowen		
1901–1909	Small Heath / Birmingham (Note: Small Heath was renamed Birmingham ahead of the 1905–06 season.)	183	(77)
1909–1912	Brighton & Hove Albion	85	(42)
1912–1913	Birmingham	53	(22)
1913–1927	Brighton & Hove Albion	71	(21)
Total		392	(162)
- * Club domestic league appearances and goals

William Henry Jones (24 March 1881 – 15 March 1948), also known as Bullet Jones and the Tipton Smasher, was an English professional footballer who played as a centre forward for Small Heath (renamed Birmingham in 1905) in the Football League and for Brighton & Hove Albion in the Southern League.

== Career ==
Jones was born in Tipton, Staffordshire. He played for Smethwick Town and for Birmingham & District League club Halesowen before turning professional with Small Heath, newly promoted to the Football League First Division, in 1901. He was their leading scorer for four successive seasons, from 1903–04 to 1906–07, and his performances were rewarded in 1904 with selection for the Football League representative team which played against the Irish Football League. Jones then suffered a series of injuries, the team's form declined, and, believing the player to be past his best, the club, now named Birmingham, released him at the end of the 1908–09 season.

Jones joined Brighton & Hove Albion of the Southern League. He was top scorer for that club in both his full seasons, with 22 and 19 goals respectively in all competitions. He contributed to them winning the 1910 Southern League championship and the 1910 FA Charity Shield, in which they beat Aston Villa, champions of the Football League, and scored the winning goal in the 1910 Southern Professional Charity Cup. Nevertheless, when Birmingham wanted to re-sign him in January 1912, the form of Jimmy Smith meant that Albion's directors were willing to let him go for a £300 fee.

Jones again top-scored for Birmingham in 1912–13, bringing his total for the club to 102 goals from 253 appearances in all competitions, before returning to Brighton in the summer.

In October 1914, Jones played for a Southern League representative team against the Scottish League; the game, played at Millwall's ground in London, finished as a 1–1 draw. By January 1915, Jones, like many of his teammates, had enlisted in the Football Battalion of the Middlesex Regiment. They trained at the White City in London, were released at weekends to play for their clubs, and Jones finished the season – the last completed before the Football League was suspended for the duration of the First World War – as Albion's top scorer for the third time. He returned to the club after the war, played his last competitive first-team match in December 1919, at the age of 38 years and 271 days, and continued to appear occasionally for the reserves until as late as 1927. He performed various roles for the club, as assistant trainer, scout and groundsman. He retired after the death of his wife in 1947, and the following March, he died in hospital after being discovered in a gas-filled room.

== Honours ==
Small Heath

- Football League Second Division runners-up: 1902–03

Brighton & Hove Albion

- Southern League: 1909–10
- Charity Shield: 1910
