= Muntz Street =

Stadium in Small Heath, Birmingham, UK

- Coventry Road
- Interactive map of Muntz Street
- Location: Small Heath, Birmingham, England
- Coordinates: 52°28′13″N 1°51′18″W
- Owner: Gessey family
- Capacity: ~30,000
- Surface: Grass

Construction
- Opened: 11 September 1877
- Closed: 22 December 1906
- Demolished: 1907

Tenants
- Small Heath F.C. (1877–1906); Small Heath A.C. (1891–1906)

Muntz Street is the popular name of a former association football stadium situated in the Small Heath district of Birmingham, England, taken from the street on which it stood. During its lifetime the ground was known as Coventry Road; the name "Muntz Street" is a more recent adoption. It was the ground at which the teams of Birmingham City F.C. – under the club's former names of Small Heath Alliance, Small Heath and Birmingham – played their home games for nearly 30 years. It also served as the headquarters of the Small Heath Athletic Club.

The Muntz Street ground, then situated on Birmingham's eastern edge and bordered on two sides by farmland, opened in 1877. It was a field with terracing round it which provided standing accommodation for roughly 10,000 spectators. A wooden stand was built and the terracing raised to expand the capacity to around 30,000, but eventually it proved too small for the football club's needs. They built a new stadium nearer the city centre, St Andrew's, which hosted its first game in December 1906. Muntz Street, by then in a heavily built-up area, was demolished in 1907 and the land used for housing. The street of the same name remains.

== Location and facilities ==
Small Heath Alliance Football Club, founded in 1875, played their first home games on waste ground off Arthur Street, in the Bordesley Green district of Birmingham, very near the site where the club's St Andrew's stadium would be built some thirty years later.^{[A]} In 1876, they made a temporary move to a fenced-off field in Ladypool Road, Sparkbrook, with a capacity estimated at 3,000; because the field was enclosed, admission could be charged. A year later they moved again, to a field in Small Heath, rented for an initial £5 a year from the family of Sam Gessey, a Small Heath player. The field had a capacity of 10,000 spectators, and was situated on the eastern edge of Birmingham's built-up area, just north of the main road to Coventry. It was bordered on two sides by developed streets, Muntz Street on the western side, Wright Street to the south; the other two sides of the enclosure adjoined farmland.^{[A]}

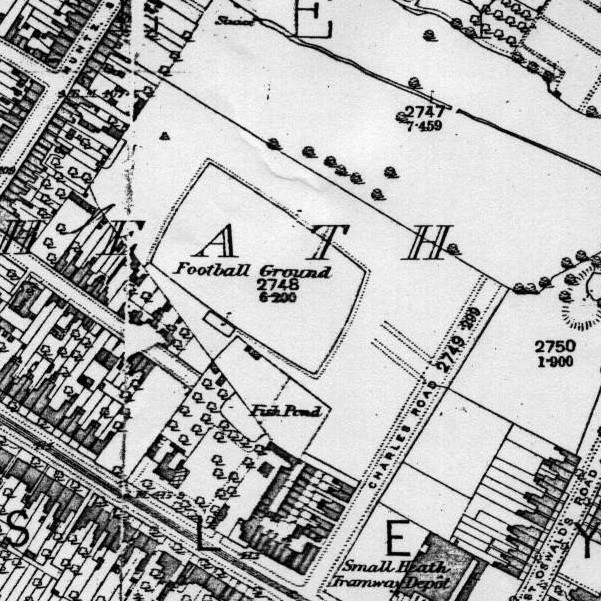
Muntz Street and surroundings in 1890

When it first opened, the ground had few facilities for either player or spectator. Uncovered terracing surrounded the pitch, and a hut acted as the players' changing room. A small but well-appointed covered wooden stand was built on the Coventry Road side, and over the years the terracing was enlarged to raise the capacity to around 30,000. In 1895, the football club bought the lease to the ground, which had 11 years remaining, for a sum of £275. Two years later, they paid £90 to their near neighbours, Aston Villa Football Club, for an old grandstand from Villa's former Wellington Road ground in Perry Barr. The club transported it piece by piece, and re-erected it as a terrace cover behind the goal at the Muntz Street end. No other major improvements were made, nor did the club ever move their administrative offices to the site, instead maintaining premises in Corporation Street, in Birmingham city centre.

Muntz Street was readily accessible by public transport. In the early years, horse-drawn buses ran along the Coventry Road, linking Small Heath with the city centre and with other nearby districts. In 1882, the building of a tramline along the Coventry Road to Small Heath Park was authorised, and four years later, the Coventry Road steam tramway route was opened to a terminus near Dora Road, a few yards past the ground. In the early years of the 20th century, this line was converted for use by electric trams.

Contemporary reports referred to the ground throughout its lifetime as Coventry Road.^{[B]} Writer and researcher Steve Beauchampé suggests that the Muntz Street name may have been adopted to distinguish it from St Andrew's, which was also built just off the Coventry Road.

== Club matches ==
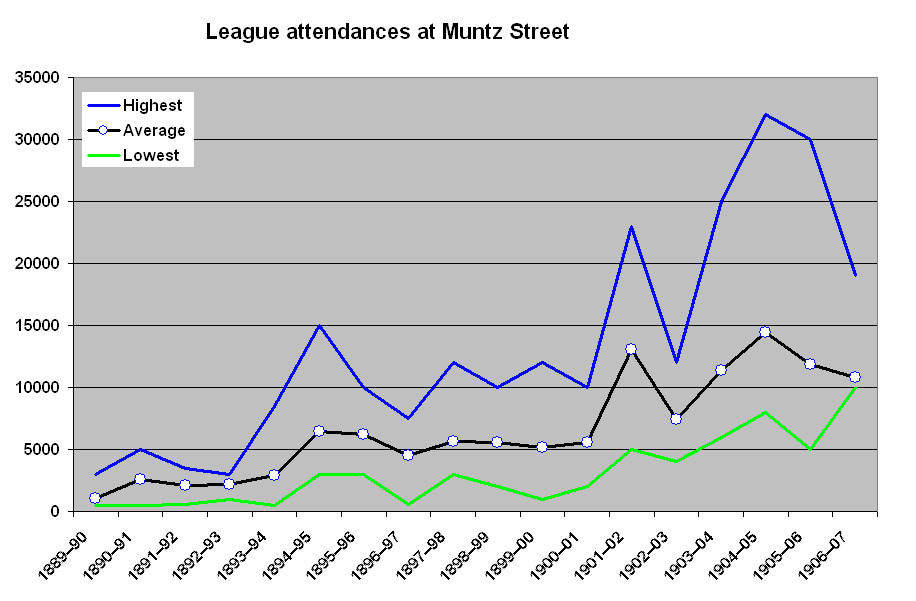
Graph of attendances for Football Alliance and Football League matches at Muntz Street

The first game at Muntz Street, a friendly match against Saltley College, was played on 11 September 1877. Small Heath Alliance won 5–0, in front of "a handful" of spectators who contributed gate receipts of 6s 8d. This marked the start of a run of 22 games unbeaten at the new ground. The playing surface was notorious for its poor quality – bumpy and stony – and was referred to locally as the "celery trenches". The first meeting between Small Heath and Aston Villa – who went on to become the club's major rivals – took place in 1879; it resulted in a 1–0 home win, after which the Villa players described the pitch as "only suitable for pot-holing". In 1883, Wednesbury Old Athletic paid Small Heath £5 to switch the venue of a Walsall Cup tie away from Muntz Street; the club took the money, won the match and went on to win the competition, their first ever silverware. Nine years later, The Wednesday offered £200 to switch venues in a second-round FA Cup tie; the money was accepted, but without the success.

Events surrounding the February 1905 First Division match with Aston Villa highlighted the ground's inadequacies. The official attendance was given as 28,000, though with the gates closed before kick-off, thousands climbed over walls or forced entrances in order to gain admission, and the actual attendance is estimated at anything up to 35,000. The Birmingham Daily Mail reported "a constant stream of vehicles to the ground, while the trams were disgorging their freights at Muntz Street every two or three minutes." Inside, "the swaying of the mass of spectators rendered the placing of additional supports against the barriers a necessary precaution", and children were passed overhead and deposited on the pitch for their own safety. The following Monday the same newspaper commented that had space been available, another ten or fifteen thousand spectators might well have attended, as "hundreds of people found the doors closed against them, and probably there were thousands who would not go to the ground in view of the inevitable crush." The size of the crowd preferring to attend the same day's Birmingham & District League match between the two clubs' reserve teams at Villa Park – at least 3,000 spectators – lent support to that view.

== Move to St Andrew's ==
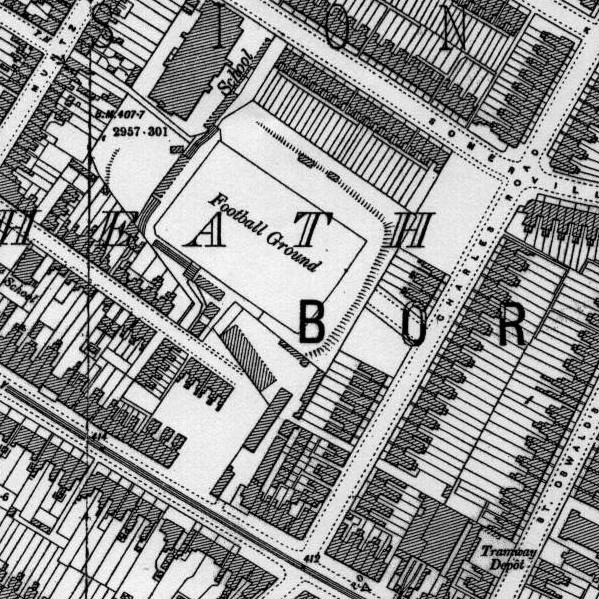
Muntz Street and surroundings in 1904

A month later the club changed its name to Birmingham Football Club, to reflect its position as the only Football League club in the city.^{[C]} Football as a spectator sport was becoming increasing popular: a Birmingham Daily Post editorial pointed out that "Birmingham has not escaped this great wave of popularity, and the club bearing the name of the city has found itself compelled to seek a new home. Its old one at Small Heath was quite inadequate for the requirements of an important match".

The rent had risen to £300 a year, and the landlords refused to sell the freehold, to renew the lease, which was nearing expiry, or to allow extensions to be made to the ground, which was by then surrounded by tightly-packed housing. The directors estimated that remaining at Muntz Street was losing the club as much as £2000 a year in revenue; the March 1906 cup-tie against Newcastle United produced receipts of £900 from a crowd restricted to 25,000, with "probably 60,000 people anxious to attend". Club director Harry Morris identified a site three-quarters of a mile (1 km) nearer the city centre where a new ground could be built, on wet, sloping wasteland where a disused brickworks stood, near the railway and St Andrew's Church. Within twelve months of a 21-year lease being signed, the new ground, which became known as St Andrew's, was ready for use.

The last game at Muntz Street was played on 22 December 1906. Birmingham beat Bury 3–1 in the First Division in front of some 10,000 spectators. The last goal was scored by Arthur Mounteney, and the Birmingham Daily Post described how

At the conclusion of the match the band played "Auld Lang Syne", and the crowd silently left the ground which has been the home of the club for so many years and the scene of many brilliant victories and many heartbreaking defeats, and of an uphill struggle from which the club, thanks to the courage of the directors, has at length emerged triumphant.

Within months the ground had been demolished, the land cleared and housing built in what became Swanage Road; no plaque commemorates the site.

== Other uses ==
Despite the apparently poor quality of pitch and facilities the Birmingham County Football Association XI, comprising players from teams in the Birmingham area, played several representative football matches at Muntz Street. The ground twice hosted matches against the London Football Association, and between 1898 and 1906 four matches were played against teams representing the Scottish Football Association.

Small Heath Athletic Club (later called Small Heath Harriers) established its headquarters at the Muntz Street ground from the club's foundation in 1891. Though primarily a cross-country and road-racing club, they also participated in track and field athletics, and during the summer months the athletes were allowed to train on the football pitch.

== Notes ==
A. ^{a} ^{b} At the very bottom centre of the 1883 map linked here, Muntz Street leaves the Coventry Road heading north-east, crossed by Wright Street. Gessey's field is on the south-eastern side of Muntz St, adjacent to the north-eastern side of the short part of Wright St, and with open country to the other two sides. At the centre left of the map, above the words "Small Heath", and bounded by Coventry Road, Cattell Road, Kelynge Street (now Tilton Road), Garrison Lane and the railway, is the site of the future St Andrew's stadium. Lower down, parallel and very close to the left edge of the map, is Arthur Street, where Small Heath Alliance first played their matches.

B. The Times described a fifth-round FA Cup tie "at the ground of the Small Heath Alliance in the Coventry-road, Birmingham" in 1886. As late as 1905, the Birmingham Evening Despatch wrote of Small Heath "only drawing" their match with Woolwich at Plumstead, having beaten them earlier in the season "at Coventry Road", and in the same year the Birmingham Daily Mail wrote that "no English Cup tie could arouse more interest in Birmingham than the meeting between Small Heath and Aston Villa at Coventry Road".

C. Aston Villa F.C. played in the municipal borough of Aston Manor, which did not become part of the city of Birmingham until 1911.
