= Billy Beer (footballer) =

English footballer and manager

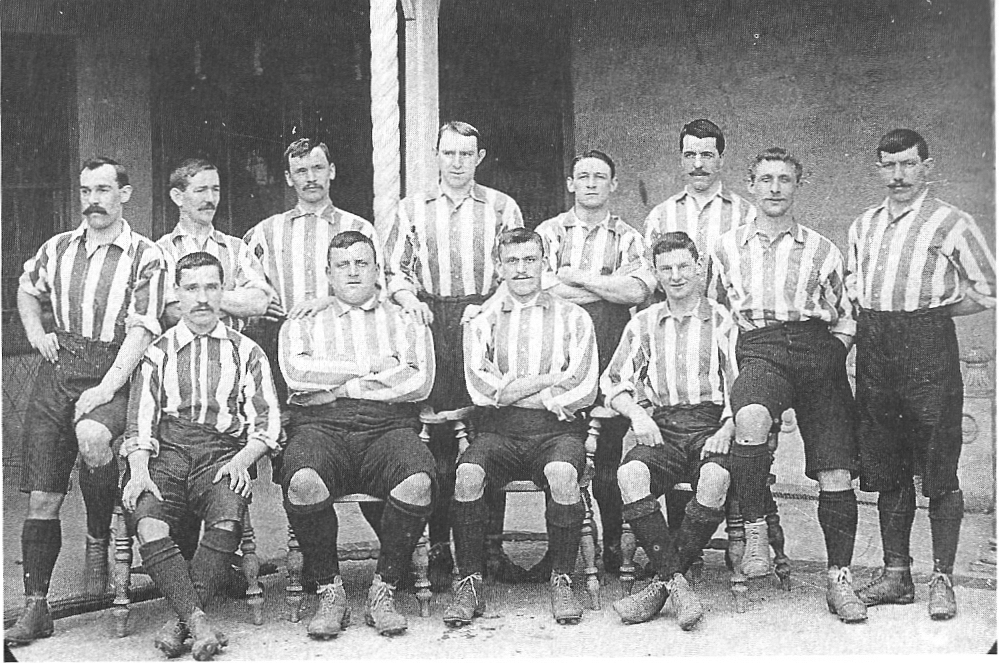
- Sheffield United's 1901 Cup Final team: Beer is seated third from the left.

Personal information
- Full name: William John Beer
- Date of birth: 4 January 1879
- Place of birth: Skinningrove, Yorkshire, England
- Date of death: 21 June 1958 (aged 79)
- Place of death: Nottingham, England
- Position: Wing half

Youth career
- Staveley Town
- Sheffield United
- –: Chesterfield Town

Senior career*
| Years | Team | Apps | (Gls) |
| 1898–1902 | Sheffield United | 73 | (18) |
| 1902–1910 | Small Heath / Birmingham (Note: Small Heath was renamed Birmingham ahead of the 1905–06 season.) | 236 | (34) |

Managerial career
- 1923–1927: Birmingham
- * Club domestic league appearances and goals

William John Beer (4 January 1879 – 21 June 1958) was an English professional footballer who played as a wing half for Sheffield United and Small Heath (renamed Birmingham in 1905).

== Playing career ==
He made over 100 appearances for Sheffield United and scored the third goal in their 4–1 defeat of Derby County in the 1899 FA Cup Final. Beer moved to Small Heath in January 1902 and the following season helped them to promotion back to the First Division. Later in his Birmingham career, he played some games at centre-forward, which combined with his prowess at penalty-taking made him the club's joint leading scorer in the 1908–09 season.

== Later career ==
He retired from football at the end of the next season, and emigrated to Australia where he became a sheep-farmer.

Returning to England in 1920, he became Birmingham's manager in 1923, taking charge of the team for four years in the First Division.

He was also a talented musician.

== Honours ==
Sheffield United

- FA Cup winners 1899.
- First Division runners up 1900

Small Heath

- Second Division promotion 1903
