= Charlie Tickle =

English footballer

Personal information
- Full name: Charles Henry Tickle
- Date of birth: 1883
- Place of birth: Kings Norton, England
- Date of death: 1960 (aged 76–77)
- Position: Forward

Youth career
- Selly Oak St Mary's
- Bournbrook

Senior career*
Years	Team	Apps	(Gls)
1902–1908	Small Heath / Birmingham (Note: Small Heath was renamed Birmingham ahead of the 1905–06 season.)	88	(14)
1908–1913	Coventry City		
1913–1915	Worcester City		
- * Club domestic league appearances and goals

Charles Henry Tickle (late 1883–1960) was an English professional footballer who played in the Football League for Small Heath, which was renamed Birmingham during his time at the club.

Tickle was born in Kings Norton, which was then in north Worcestershire but has been part of Birmingham since 1911, and brought up in the Bournbrook district. He worked as a stencil-cutter, and played football for local clubs Selly Oak St Mary's and Bournbrook, before he signed professional forms for Small Heath, as the Birmingham club were then called, in January 1902.

He made his Football League debut on 18 October 1902 in the Second Division away match against Gainsborough Trinity which Small Heath lost 1–0. Tickle played only twice in the 1902–03 season, and not at all the following year in the First Division. After Charlie Athersmith retired, Tickle established himself in the first team, playing at either outside right or inside right. During his sixth and last season with the club, his performances earned him selection for a Football League representative team which played against their Scottish counterparts at Villa Park.

When at the end of that 1907–08 season, the club were relegated back to the Second Division, Tickle chose to move into the Southern League. He spent five seasons with Coventry City and then joined Worcester City.

Tickle went on to work for Birmingham Corporation Tramways and played football for their works team, of the same name.
