= Walter Wigmore =

English footballer

Personal information
- Full name: Walter Wigmore
- Date of birth: 25 February 1873
- Place of birth: Pucklechurch, England
- Date of death: 8 September 1931 (aged 58)
- Place of death: Worksop, England
- Positions: Inside forward; centre half

Senior career*
Years	Team	Apps	(Gls)
1891–1892	Kiveton Park		
1892–1893	Sheffield United		
1893–1894	Worksop Town		
1894–1896	Sheffield United	2	(0)
1896–1899	Gainsborough Trinity	78	(42)
1899–1912	Small Heath / Birmingham (Note: Small Heath was renamed Birmingham ahead of the 1905–06 season.)	329	(23)
1912–1913	Brierley Hill Alliance		
- * Club domestic league appearances and goals

Walter Wigmore (25 February 1873 – 8 September 1931) was an English professional footballer who made more than 400 appearances in the Football League playing for Sheffield United, Gainsborough Trinity and Small Heath / Birmingham in a 17-year career. In the early part of his career he played as an inside forward and later on as a centre-half.

== Personal life ==
Wigmore was born in Pucklechurch, Gloucestershire, one of the many children of Charles and Mary Wigmore. As a child he moved with his family to the coal mining village of Kiveton Park in Yorkshire, where his father and older brothers worked as miners. Wigmore himself became a miner before making a career in football.

He died in Worksop at the age of 58.

== Football career ==
Wigmore played football for his local club, Kiveton Park, before joining Worksop Town in 1893. From there he was signed by Sheffield United in June 1894, where his first season consisted mainly of games for United's reserve team, the Sheffield Strollers.

He moved to newly elected Second Division club Gainsborough Trinity in 1896, where he struck up an excellent strike partnership with Bob McRoberts. In February 1899, terms were agreed for Wigmore to join The Wednesday, but reports that the transfer had taken place were premature, as the player rejected the move. A few weeks later, Small Heath paid a fee of £180 to reunite him with McRoberts. Tried at centre-half when Alex Leake was injured, he impressed so much that for nine years he remained first choice in that position, making the last of his 355 appearances for Birmingham only a few days before his 39th birthday. He was often penalised for dangerous play due to his unusual reluctance to head the ball, preferring to use his feet however high the ball came to him.

== Honours ==
Birmingham City

- Football League Second Division runners up: 1900–01, 1902–03
