= Jim Dougherty (footballer) =

English footballer

Personal information
- Full name: James Dougherty
- Date of birth: 19 November 1878
- Place of birth: New Brighton, Cheshire, England
- Date of death: 1944
- Place of death: Liverpool, England
- Position: Wing half

Youth career
- New Brighton Old Wanderers
- Liscard YMCA

Senior career*
| Years | Team | Apps | (Gls) |
| 1897–1898 | New Brighton Tower | | |
| 1898–1900 | Chorley | | |
| 1900–1901 | New Brighton Tower | 12 | (0) |
| 1901–1908 | Small Heath / Birmingham (Note: Small Heath was renamed Birmingham ahead of the 1905–06 season.) | 130 | (3) |
| 1908–19?? | Coventry City | | |
- Stirchley United
- Worcester City
- * Club domestic league appearances and goals

James Dougherty (19 November 1878 – 1944) was an English footballer who played as a wing half. He made 136 appearances for Small Heath (renamed Birmingham in 1905), including 99 in the First Division, and also played league football for New Brighton Tower and Southern League football for Coventry City. He was twice named as reserve for England but did not play.

== Honours ==
Small Heath

- Second Division runners-up: 1902–03
