= List of people from Northumberland =

This list is of people who were born or raised in the County of Northumberland, in England. The area covered is the ceremonial county, hence the exclusion of places traditionally regarded as being in Northumberland which are now in Tyne and Wear for administrative and ceremonial purposes. The list is intended to complement Category:People from Northumberland.

== Art and architecture ==
- Pauline Bewick (born 1935), watercolour painter
- Thomas Bewick (1753–1828), wood engraver, born at Cherryburn, Mickley
- Glenn Brown (born 1966), painter and Turner Prize nominee
- Lancelot "Capability" Brown (1716–1783), landscape architect
- John Clayton (1792–1890), antiquarian and town clerk of Newcastle upon Tyne
- Luke Clennell (1781–1840), engraver
- Archibald Matthias Dunn (1832–1917), Catholic architect, born in Wylam
- Mark Fiennes (1933–2004), photographer
- Noel Forster (1932–2007), abstract painter
- John and Benjamin Green (1789–1852; c. 1807 – 1868), architects
- Hermione Hammond (1910–2005), painter
- John Jackson (1801–1848), wood engraver, born at Ovingham, apprenticed to Thomas Bewick
- Mason Jackson (1819–1903), wood engraver, born at Ovingham
- John Martin (1789–1854), influential English Romantic painter of the nineteenth century, born in Haydon Bridge, his dramatic The Destruction of Sodom and Gomorrah can be seen in the Laing Art Gallery in Newcastle upon Tyne
- Vanessa Raw (born 28 September 1984), artist, born in Hexham
- Willey Reveley (1760–1799), architect
- T. J. Cobden Sanderson (1840–1922), Arts and Crafts Movement artist
- Imogen Stubbs (born 1961), actress and playwright, born in Rothbury
- Stella Vine (born 1969), English contemporary artist (figurative painting), born in Alnwick

== Business ==
- William George Armstrong, 1st Baron Armstrong (1810–1900), Tyneside industrialist who was the effective founder of the Armstrong Whitworth manufacturing empire
- Emerson Muschamp Bainbridge (1817–1892), founder of Bainbridge Department Store in Newcastle upon Tyne, the first such store in the world (still the largest John Lewis outside London)
- John Hall (born 1933), property developer and chairman of Newcastle United
- Peter Horbury (born c.1950), car designer
- Charles Algernon Parsons (1854–1931), engineer known for his invention of the steam turbine, buried at Kirkwhelpington
- Lewy Pattinson (1852–1944), Australian businessman, born in Hexham
- John Urpeth Rastrick (1780–1856), steam locomotive builder
- John Wigham Richardson (1837–1908), shipbuilder

== Entertainment ==
=== Acting ===
- Daniel Ainsleigh (born 1976), British actor and acting coach, born in Hexham
- Robson Green (born 1964), television actor and singer
- Jean Heywood (born 1921), British actress, appearing in films and television programmes
- Alexander Knox (died 1995), Canadian actor; died at Berwick
- Darren Newton (born 1969), actor and theatre director
- Ben Roberts, television actor
- Ray Stevenson (born 1964), Northern Irish film and television actor; grew up in Cramlington
- Tip Tipping (1958–1993), actor, died in a parachuting accident at Alnwick
- Henry Travers (1874–1965), born in Prudhoe; character actor best known for his roles in Hollywood film productions, most famously as Clarence the angel in It's a Wonderful Life (1946)
- Kevin Whately (born 1951), English television actor, starring in Auf Wiedersehen, Pet, Peak Practice, Inspector Morse, and Lewis

=== Broadcasting ===
- Tony Bastable (1944–2007), children's television presenter and producer
- Ian Peacock, radio presenter
- Sid Waddell (born 1940), English sports commentator and television personality

=== Comedy ===
- Alexander Armstrong (born 1970), comedian, actor and television personality

=== Music ===
- Darren Allison (born 1968), record producer and musician with The Divine Comedy, Spiritualized and others
- Graham Bell (1948–2008), singer with Skip Bifferty and as a solo artist
- Dave Cliff (born 1944), British jazz guitarist
- Pete Doherty (born 1979), musician with The Libertines and Babyshambles
- China Drum (fl. 1981–2001), punk rock band
- Mark Elder (born 1947), British conductor, currently the music director of The Hallé Orchestra in Manchester, England
- Wilfred Gibson (born 1945), violinist with the Electric Light Orchestra
- John Peacock (c. 1756 – 1817), Northumbrian smallpipes player
- Sting (born 1951), singer with The Police and multi-Grammy Award winning solo artist

== Military ==
- William Wilson Allen (1844–1890), recipient of the Victoria Cross
- Henry Askew (1775–1847), general
- Joe Baker-Cresswell (1901–1997), aide-de-camp to King George VI and High Sheriff of Northumberland
- Sam Browne (1824–1901), British Indian Army general
- Hugh Cairns (1896–1918), recipient of the Victoria Cross
- Francis Crake (1893–1920), soldier and Royal Irish Constabulary officer
- Frederick William Dobson (1886–1935), recipient of the Victoria Cross
- James Bulmer Johnson (1889–1943), recipient of the Victoria Cross
- David Murray-Lyon (1890–1975), British Indian Army general
- James Robb (1895–1968), senior Royal Air Force commander (Air Chief Marshal), and was Commander-in-Chief of Fighter Command from 1945 to 1947
- Richard Been Stannard (1902–1977), recipient of the Victoria Cross
- Tod Sweeney (1919–2001), platoon commander at the Normandy Landings
- Patrick Tonyn (1725–1804), general and colonial governor
- Adam Herbert Wakenshaw (1914–1942), recipient of the Victoria Cross

== Nobility ==
- Æthelfrith of Northumbria (died c. 616), King of Bernicia from c. 593 until c. 616; he was also, beginning c. 604, the first Bernician king to also rule Deira; can be considered, in historical terms, the first Northumbrian king
- Arthur Bigge, 1st Baron Stamfordham (1849–1931), private secretary to Queen Victoria and George V; born at Linden Hall, near Morpeth
- Robert de Ros (1177–1226)
- Margaret Douglas (1515–1578)
- Waltheof, Earl of Dunbar (died 1182)
- Gospatric II, Earl of Lothian (died 1138)
- Gospatric III, Earl of Lothian (died 1166)
- Forster baronets (established 1620)
- Ida of Bernicia (died 559), Ida or Ida the Flamebearer, was a ruler (probably the founder) of the Anglo-Saxon kingdom of Bernicia between 547 and 559
- Malcolm III of Scotland (died 1093), died at Alnwick
- Henry 'Hotspur' Percy (c. 1364 – 1403), son of the 1st Earl of Northumberland
- Henry Percy, 1st Earl of Northumberland (1341–1408)
- Henry Percy, 2nd Earl of Northumberland (1392–1455)
- Henry Percy, 5th Earl of Northumberland (1477–1527)
- William Widdrington, 1st Baron Widdrington (1610–1651)

== Politics ==
- Peter Atkinson (born 1943), Conservative MP for Hexham
- Gordon Banks (born 1955), Labour MP for Ochil and South Perthshire
- Alan Beith (born 1943), Member of Parliament for Berwick-upon-Tweed 1973-2015, now Lord Beith
- Josephine Butler (1828–1906), feminist activist, born at Milfield
- Ronnie Campbell (born 1943), Labour MP for Blyth Valley
- John Candlish (1816–1874), Liberal MP for Sunderland
- Hilton Dawson (born 1953), Labour MP for Lancaster and Wyre
- William Elliott, Baron Elliott of Morpeth (born 1920), Conservative politician
- Charles Fenwick (1850–1918), Lib-Lab MP for Wansbeck and Trades Union Congress leader
- Charles Grey, 2nd Earl Grey (1764–1845), Whig Prime Minister (1830–1834)
- Antony Lambton (1922–2006), Viscount Lambton, was the controversial Tory Member of Parliament for Berwick-upon-Tweed from 1951 until 1973
- Denis Murphy (born 1940), Labour MP for Wansbeck
- Jeremy Purvis (born 1974), Liberal Democrat MSP, and youngest person in Scottish Parliament at time of election
- John Campbell Renton (born 1814), Member of Parliament for Berwick-upon-Tweed
- Joseph Richardson (1755–1803), Whig activist
- Ralph Widdrington (1640–1718), MP for Berwick-upon-Tweed

== Religion ==
- Martin of Alnwick (d. 1336), Franciscan friar and theologian
- William Bickerton (1815–1905), founder of The Church of Jesus Christ (Bickertonite)
- Bolton Stafford Bird (1840–1924), clergyman
- Benedict Biscop (628–690), abbot
- Charles Lisle Carr (1871–1942), Church of England bishop
- Cedd (c. 620 – 664), evangelist and saint
- John Farrar (1802–1884), Methodist clergyman and writer
- John of Hexham (c. 1160 – 1209), English chronicler, known to us merely as the author of a work called the Historia XXV. annorum, which continues the Historia regum attributed to Symeon of Durham, and contains an account of English events from 1130 to 1153
- Edward Knott (1581–1656), most important English Jesuit of his day
- William Turnbull Leach (1805–1886), clergyman and academic
- Chad of Mercia (died 672), abbot, bishop and saint
- Robert Morrison (1782–1834), missionary in China
- Joseph Parker (1830–1902), Congregationalist preacher and writer
- Richard of Hexham (fl. 1141), English chronicler, who became prior of Hexham about 1141, and died between 1163 and 1178
- Nicholas Ridley (1500–1555), bishop and martyr of the Marian Persecutions
- Ailred of Rievaulx (1110–1167), writer and saint
- Robert of Holy Island (died 1283), Bishop of Durham
- Joseph Stevenson (1806–1895), archivist and Jesuit
- Rowland Taylor (1510–1555), martyr of the Marian Persecutions
- Henry Baker Tristram (1822–1906), clergyman and Bible scholar
- John of Trokelowe (fl. 14th century), Benedictine and chronicler
- Keith Ward (born 1938), Regius Professor of Divinity at Oxford, born in Hexham
- William of Alnwick (c. 1275 – 1333), Franciscan theologian and Bishop of Giovinazzo
- N. T. Wright (born 1948), Bishop of Durham

== Science and medicine ==
- George Biddell Airy (1801–1892), mathematician and Astronomer Royal
- Martyn Amos (born 1971), Senior Lecturer in Computing and Public Engagement Fellow at Manchester Metropolitan University; expert on natural computation and DNA computing; born in Hexham
- Charles Baring, 2nd Baron Howick of Glendale (born 1937), arboriculturalist and plant collector
- Thomas Gibson (died 1562), printer and physician, born in Morpeth
- Timothy Hackworth (1786–1850), steam locomotive engineer
- William Hewson (1739–1774), 18th-century surgeon, anatomist and physiologist; sometimes referred to as the 'father of haematology'
- Andrew Karney (born 1942), electrical engineer
- Frank Lees (1931–1999), chemical engineer; professor at Loughborough University; noted for his contribution to the field of industrial safety
- Prideaux John Selby (1788–1867), ornithologist
- James Calvert Spence (1892–1954), paediatrician
- George Stephenson (1781–1848), steam locomotive engineer
- Ralph Tate (1840–1901), botanist
- William Turner (1508–1568), pioneer of ornithology and botany as sciences
- Donald I. Williamson (born 1922), zoologist

== Sport ==
=== Athletics ===
- Jim Alder (born 1940), Commonwealth Games gold medal winning marathon runner
- Vanessa Raw (born 1984), professional English triathlete, and member of the British Olympic Triathlon Academy Squad, born in Hexham

=== Cricket ===
- Norman Graham (born 1943), cricketer who played for Kent, born at Hexham
- Ken Graveney (born 1924), English cricketer who played for and captained Gloucestershire, born in Hexham
- Tom Graveney (born 1927), former English cricketer; President of the Marylebone Cricket Club for 2004-5; played for England in 79 Tests; a Wisden Cricketer of the Year in 1953; born in Riding Mill
- Steve Harmison (born 1978), Durham and England cricketer
- John Wake (born 1953), Bedfordshire cricketer

=== Football ===
NB: Clubs listed are those at which the player made 100 or more League appearances or, if not applicable, club at which they made most appearances.

- Chris Adamson (born 1978), played for St Patrick's Athletic
- Jimmy Adamson (born 1929), played for and managed Burnley
- Jimmy Allen (1913–1979), played for Queens Park Rangers
- Ben Alnwick (born 1987), played for Sunderland
- John Angus (1938–2021), played for Burnley
- Colin Ayre (born 1956), played in the English, Dutch and Austrian football leagues
- Bob Bearpark (1943–1996), Canada men's national soccer team coach
- Paul Boertien (born 1979), played for Derby County
- Martin Brittain (born 1984), plays for Gateshead
- John Brodie (born 1947), played for Port Vale
- Alan Brown (1914–1996), played for and managed Burnley, managed Sunderland
- James Brown (born 1987), Hartlepool United F C striker, born in Cramlington
- Joe Brown (born 1929), played for A.F.C. Bournemouth
- Steve Bruce (born 1960), manager of Sunderland, played for Gillingham, Norwich City & Manchester United, born in Corbridge
- James Bumphrey (1885–?), played for Birmingham
- Mick Buxton (born 1943), managed Huddersfield Town and Sunderland
- Jack Callender (1923–2001), played for Gateshead
- John Callender (1903–1980), played for Gateshead
- Tom Callender (1920–2002), played for Gateshead
- Graham Carr (born 1944), played for and managed Northampton Town
- William Carrier (1887-after 1911), played for Birmingham
- Tony Carss (born 1976), played for Huddersfield Town
- Stuart Chapman (born 1951), played for Port Vale
- Bobby Charlton (born 1937), played for Manchester United
- Jack Charlton (born 1935), played for Leeds United
- George Cook (born 1904), played for Torquay United
- Billy Cowell (born 1902), played for Huddersfield Town and Hartlepool United
- Jack Coxford (1901–1978), played for Bournemouth & Boscombe Athletic
- Steve Davis (born 1968), played for Burnley and Luton Town
- Andy Duncan, played for Cambridge United
- Shaun Elliott (born 1957), played for Sunderland
- David Fairhurst (1906–1972), played for Newcastle United
- Ian Ferguson (born 1968), Scottish, played for Raith Rovers, ended his professional career in 2004 with Berwick Rangers
- Steve Finney (born 1973), played for Swindon Town
- Bobby Flavell (born 1956), played for Halifax Town
- Fraser Forster (born 1988), plays for Newcastle United
- Bill Fraser (1907-?), played for Southampton
- Allan Gauden (born 1944), played for Sunderland
- Robert Gordon (1917–1940), played for Huddersfield Town
- Wilf Grant (1920–1990), played for Cardiff City
- Kevin Henderson (born 1974), played for Hartlepool United
- Peter Henderson (born 1952), played for Chester
- Bob Hewitson (1884–1957), played for Crystal Palace
- Rob Hindmarch (1961–2002), played for Sunderland and Derby County
- Jimmy Isaac (born 1916), played for Hartlepools United
- Derek Jefferson (born 1948), played for Ipswich Town
- Jimmy Kelly (1931–2003), played for Watford and Blackpool
- Ray Kennedy (born 1951), played for Arsenal and Liverpool
- George King (born 1923), played for Gillingham
- Ray King (born 1924), played for Port Vale
- Dan Kirkup (born 1988), plays for Workington
- Joe Kirkup (born 1939), played for West Ham United and Southampton
- Mel Lintern (born 1950), played for Carlisle United
- Joe Lynn (born 1925), played for Rochdale
- Jamie McClen (born 1979), played for Gateshead
- William McCourty (1884-after 1909), played for Birmingham
- Billy McGlen (1921–1999), played for Manchester United and Lincoln City
- George Milburn (1910–1980), played for Leeds United and Chesterfield
- Jack Milburn (1908–1979), played for Leeds United
- Jackie Milburn (1924–1988), played for Newcastle United
- Jim Milburn (1919–1985), played for Leeds United and Bradford Park Avenue
- Stanley Milburn (born 1926), played for Chesterfield, Leicester City and Rochdale
- Harry Mills (born 1922), played for Huddersfield Town
- Bob Morton (1906–1990), played for Port Vale
- Malcolm Musgrove (1933–2007), played for West Ham United
- Brian O'Neil (born 1944), played for Burnley and Southampton
- Graeme Owens (born 1988), played for Middlesbrough, born in Cramlington
- John Potts (born 1904), played for Port Vale
- Peter Ramage (born 1983), played for Newcastle United
- Jimmy Richardson (1911–1964), played for Newcastle United and Huddersfield Town
- Joe Richardson (1908–1977), played for Newcastle United
- John Ritchie (born 1944), played for Port Vale
- Joe Robinson (1919–1991), played for Hartlepools United
- Jock Rutherford (1884–1963), played for Newcastle United and Woolwich Arsenal
- John Shiel (born 1917), played for Huddersfield Town
- Andy Sinton (born 1966), played for Brentford and Queens Park Rangers
- George Stephenson (1900–1971), played for Aston Villa
- Trevor Steven (born 1963), played for Everton and Rangers
- Bob Stokoe (1930–2004), played for Newcastle United and later managed Sunderland A.F.C.
- Eric Tait (born 1951), played and managed for Berwick Rangers
- Martin Taylor (born 1979), plays for Birmingham City
- Steven Taylor (born 1986), plays for Newcastle United
- David Thompson (born 1968), played for Millwall
- Joe Tulip played for Queen of the South F.C.
- Shaun Vipond (born 1988), plays for Workington
- Tommy Walker (1923–2005), played for Oldham Athletic
- Dave Walton (born 1973), played for Shrewsbury Town and Crewe Alexandra
- Jimmy Wardhaugh (1929–1978), played for Heart of Midlothian
- Norman Wilkinson (born 1931), played for York City
- Billy Wilson (born 1946), played for Blackburn Rovers and Portsmouth

=== Horse racing ===
- Jonathan E. Pease (born 1952), Thoroughbred racehorse trainer
- Nicky Richards (born 1956), National Hunt racehorse trainer

=== Other ===
- Kenneth Ferrie (born 1978), golfer
- Gavin Kerr (born 1977), lived in Berwick for most of his childhood; played professional rugby, a regular in the Scotland rugby team, has 36 caps and 1 try
- Gary Robson (born 1967), World Darts Trophy winning darts player
- Muriel Robb (born 1878), Tennis 1902 Wimbledon Women's champion
- Craig Smith (born 1978), lived in Berwick for most of his childhood and attended Berwick County High School; played professional rugby union for the Scotland rugby team with 18 caps
- Matthew Wells, Olympic rower, brother of Peter Wells
- Peter Wells, Olympic rower, brother of Matthew Wells

== Writers ==
- Kate Adie (born 1945), print and broadcast journalist
- Ruth Ainsworth (1908–1984), children's writer of the Rufty Tufty Golliwog series
- Richard Armstrong (1903–1986), novelist and historian
- John Blackburn (1923–1993), novelist who wrote thrillers, horror novels, including The Flame and the Wind (1967)
- Robert Blakey (1795–1878), radical journalist and philosopher born in Manchester Street, Morpeth
- John Brown (1715–1766), religious writer and playwright
- Richard Burridge (born 1951), screenwriter
- Ann Cook (fl. 1760), innkeeper and author of Professed cookery, see Hannah Glasse
- Samuel Edward Cook (died 1856), travel writer
- Catherine Cookson (1906–1998), author, resided at Corbridge
- Gabriel Fielding (1916–1986), pen name of Alan Gabriel Barnsley, British novelist whose works include In the Time of Greenbloom, The Birthday King, Through Streets Broad and Narrow and The Women of Guinea Lane
- John Gardner (1926–2007), creator of Boysie Oakes series and author of James Bond books
- Wilfrid Wilson Gibson (1878–1962), British poet, associated with World War I, born in Hexham
- Hannah Glasse (1708–1770), cookery writer
- M. B. Halbeck (1936–1989), poet
- Nigel Hamilton (born 1944), biographer and academic
- John Cuthbert Hedley (1830–1915), religious writer
- John Hodgson, wrote his History of Northumberland during his incumbency at Kirkwhelpington, 1823–34
- Gordon Parker (born 1940), novelist and playwright
- Eric Pringle, children's writer
- James Runciman (1852–1891), journalist
- Steven Runciman (1903–2000), historian of the Middle Ages
- William M. Timlin (1892–1943), author and architect
- Hugh Trevor-Roper (1914–2003), historian of Early Modern Britain and Nazi Germany
- Veronica Wedgwood (1910–1997), historian of the English Civil War

== Other people ==
- John Ashenden (d. in or before 1368?), astrologer, born Northumberland
- Bernard Bosanquet (1848–1923), philosopher and political theorist
- John Busby (1765–1867), surveyor and civil engineer
- Ned Coulson, celebrity of Haydon Bridge, noted for his wonderful swiftness of foot
- Grace Darling (1815–1842), heroine of a celebrated maritime rescue
- Richard Duncan (died 1819), judge and politician in Upper Canada
- Matthew Festing (born 1949), Grand Master of the Sovereign Military Order of Malta
- Philip Hunter (born 1940), Schools Adjudicator for England
- Robert Huntley (1920–2001), first Head of Scotland Yard's Bomb Squad
- Ralph Hush (1779–1860), convict sent to Australia
- Jonathan Martin (1782–1838), arsonist of York Minster
- John Minto (1822–1915), American pioneer, sheep farmer, and Republican representative in the state legislature, born in Wylam
- William Peel (born 1875), British colonial administrator who became the Governor of Hong Kong
- Natalie Pike (born 1983), FHM High Street Honey winner and subsequent glamour model; used to live in Berwick
- William Smith (1775–?), mariner and explorer
- Edward Stamp (1814–1872), mariner and colonialist
- John Stevens, Baron Stevens of Kirkwhelpington (born 1942), whose career included head of the Metropolitan Police Service, and Chancellor of Northumbria University
- Robert Whinham (1776–1861), nurseryman; around the 1830s, bred the red gooseberry Whinham's Industry, which was given the RHS Award of Garden Merit in 1915 and 1993
