= 1910–11 Birmingham F.C. season =

Birmingham F.C.
1910–11 season
- Chairman: Walter W. Hart
- Manager: Alex Watson
- Ground: St Andrew's
- Football League Second Division: 16th
- FA Cup: First round (eliminated by Oldham Athletic)
- Top goalscorer: League: Jack Hall (13); All: Jack Hall (14)
- Highest home attendance: 37,520 vs West Bromwich Albion, 27 December 1909
- Lowest home attendance: 2,000 vs Glossop, 3 December 1909
- Average home league attendance: 13,817
Team colours

The 1910–11 Football League season was Birmingham Football Club's 19th in the Football League and their 11th in the Second Division. Having finished bottom of the league in 1909–10, they had to apply for re-election to the League for 1910–11. They led the voting, ahead of Huddersfield Town who were elected to the league to replace Grimsby Town, who had finished the 1909–10 season in 19th place, above Birmingham.

Birmingham finished the season 16th in the 20-team division, and lost to Oldham Athletic in the first round of the FA Cup. Twenty-nine players made at least one appearance in nationally organised first-team competition, and there were fourteen different goalscorers. Half-back Thomas Daykin played in 37 matches over the 40-match season; only two other players reached 30 appearances. Jack Hall was leading scorer with 13 goals, of 14 which came in the league.

Watson resigned as secretary-manager at the end of the season, and the club decided to separate the roles of manager and secretary. Bob McRoberts, who had played as a forward for the club for seven years, was appointed as team manager, with no secretarial duties, and Watson's former assistant, Frank Richards, took over as secretary.

== Football League Second Division ==
| Date | League position | Opponents | Venue | Result | Score F–A | Scorers | Attendance |
|---|---|---|---|---|---|---|---|
| 3 September 1910 | 19th | Fulham | A | L | 0–3 | | 25,000 |
| 10 September 1910 | 14th | Bradford Park Avenue | H | W | 1–0 | McKay | 18,000 |
| 17 September 1910 | 14th | Burnley | A | D | 2–2 | Millington, Jones | 10,000 |
| 24 September 1910 | 14th | Gainsborough Trinity | H | D | 1–1 | Jones | 12,000 |
| 1 October 1910 | 14th | Leeds City | A | D | 1–1 | Bonthron pen | 8,000 |
| 8 October 1910 | 17th | Stockport County | H | L | 1–3 | Jones | 10,000 |
| 15 October 1910 | 18th | Derby County | A | L | 0–1 | | 10,000 |
| 22 October 1910 | 16th | Barnsley | H | W | 1–0 | Freeman | 10,000 |
| 29 October 1910 | 18th | Leicester Fosse | A | L | 0–2 | | 10,000 |
| 5 November 1910 | 18th | Wolverhampton Wanderers | H | L | 1–3 | Foxall | 20,000 |
| 12 November 1910 | 16th | Chelsea | A | D | 1–1 | Jones, Wigmore | 25,000 |
| 19 November 1910 | 19th | Clapton Orient | H | L | 0–1 | | 14,000 |
| 26 November 1910 | 19th | Blackpool | A | L | 1–3 | Kidd | 4,000 |
| 3 December 1910 | 19th | Glossop | H | L | 1–2 | Jones | 2,000 |
| 10 December 1910 | 18th | Lincoln City | A | W | 1–0 | Firth | 6,000 |
| 17 December 1910 | 15th | Huddersfield Town | A | W | 2–1 | Gallimore, Hall | 5,000 |
| 24 December 1910 | 15th | Bolton Wanderers | A | L | 1–5 | Hall | 8,000 |
| 26 December 1910 | 17th | Hull City | A | L | 1–4 | Hall | 10,000 |
| 27 December 1910 | 16th | West Bromwich Albion | H | D | 1–1 | Hall | 37,520 |
| 31 December 1910 | 15th | Fulham | H | D | 1–1 | Hall | 14,000 |
| 7 January 1911 | 16th | Bradford Park Avenue | A | D | 2–2 | Firth, Hall | 10,000 |
| 21 January 1911 | 16th | Burnley | H | D | 1–1 | Jones | 10,000 |
| 28 January 1911 | 16th | Gainsborough Trinity | A | L | 0–1 | | 3,000 |
| 4 February 1911 | 16th | Leeds City | H | W | 2–1 | Foxall, Powell | 15,000 |
| 13 February 1911 | 16th | Stockport County | A | L | 1–3 | Buckley | 3,000 |
| 18 February 1911 | 16th | Derby County | H | W | 2–0 | Jones, Foxall | 15,000 |
| 25 February 1911 | 15th | Barnsley | A | W | 3–2 | Jones, Hall 2 | 2,500 |
| 4 March 1911 | 15th | Leicester Fosse | H | W | 1–0 | Buckley | 10,000 |
| 11 March 1911 | 15th | Wolverhampton Wanderers | A | L | 1–3 | Hall | 5,000 |
| 18 March 1911 | 15th | Chelsea | H | W | 2–1 | Hall, Kidd | 27,000 |
| 25 March 1911 | 16th | Clapton Orient | A | L | 1–2 | Hall | 6,000 |
| 1 April 1911 | 16th | Blackpool | H | W | 2–0 | McKay, Hall | 13,000 |
| 8 April 1911 | 16th | Glossop | A | L | 1–2 | Jones | 1,500 |
| 14 April 1911 | 15th | Hull City | H | W | 1–0 | Hall | 10,000 |
| 15 April 1911 | 15th | Lincoln City | H | L | 0–1 | | 10,000 |
| 17 April 1911 | 16th | West Bromwich Albion | A | L | 0–1 | | 27,042 |
| 22 April 1911 | 16th | Huddersfield Town | A | L | 1–7 | Jones | 9,000 |
| 29 April 1911 | 16th | Bolton Wanderers | H | W | 2–1 | Millington, Jones | 15,000 |

=== League table (part) ===
Final Second Division table (part)
| Pos | Club | Pld | W | D | L | F | A | GA | Pts |
|---|---|---|---|---|---|---|---|---|---|
| 14th | Glossop | 38 | 13 | 8 | 17 | 48 | 62 | 0.77 | 34 |
| 15th | Leicester Fosse | 38 | 14 | 5 | 19 | 52 | 62 | 0.84 | 33 |
| 16th | Birmingham | 38 | 8 | 7 | 23 | 42 | 66 | 0.74 | 32 |
| 17th | Stockport County | 38 | 9 | 6 | 23 | 47 | 79 | 0.59 | 30 |
| 18th | Gainsborough Trinity | 38 | 9 | 11 | 18 | 37 | 55 | 0.67 | 29 |
| Key | Pos = League position; Pld = Matches played; W = Matches won; D = Matches drawn; L = Matches lost; F = Goals for; A = Goals against; GA = Goal average; Pts = Points | | | | | | | | |
| Source | | | | | | | | | |

== FA Cup ==
| Round | Date | Opponents | Venue | Result | Score F–A | Scorers | Attendance |
|---|---|---|---|---|---|---|---|
| First round | 14 January 1911 | Oldham Athletic | H | D | 1–1 | Hall pen | 28,827 |
| First round replay | 17 January 1911 | Oldham Athletic | A | L | 0–2 | | 6,400 |

== Appearances and goals ==
This table includes appearances and goals in nationally organised competitive matches – the Football League and FA Cup – only.
For a description of the playing positions, see Formation (association football)#2–3–5 (Pyramid).
Players marked † left the club during the playing season.

Players' appearances and goals by competition
| Name | Position | League | | FA Cup | | Total | |
| Name | Position | Apps | Goals | Apps | Goals | Apps | Goals |
|---|---|---|---|---|---|---|---|
| Horace Bailey | Goalkeeper | 12 | 0 | 0 | 0 | 12 | 0 |
| Jack Dorrington | Goalkeeper | 19 | 0 | 2 | 0 | 21 | 0 |
| Albert Lindon | Goalkeeper | 7 | 0 | 0 | 0 | 7 | 0 |
| Bob Bonthron | Full back | 11 | 1 | 1 | 0 | 12 | 1 |
| Crosby Henderson | Full back | 6 | 0 | 0 | 0 | 6 | 0 |
| Walter Wigmore | Full back | 14 | 1 | 1 | 0 | 15 | 1 |
| Frank Womack | Full back | 32 | 0 | 2 | 0 | 32 | 2 |
| Frank Buckley | Half back | 30 | 2 | 0 | 0 | 30 | 2 |
| James Bumphrey | Half back | 12 | 0 | 0 | 0 | 12 | 0 |
| Walter Corbett | Half back | 11 | 0 | 0 | 0 | 11 | 0 |
| Thomas Daykin | Half back | 35 | 0 | 2 | 0 | 37 | 0 |
| Albert Gardner | Half back | 18 | 0 | 2 | 0 | 18 | 0 |
| James Moles | Half back | 6 | 0 | 0 | 0 | 6 | 0 |
| George Robertson | Half back | 19 | 0 | 2 | 0 | 21 | 0 |
| Walter Abbott | Forward | 1 | 0 | 0 | 0 | 1 | 0 |
| Harry Draper | Forward | 3 | 0 | 0 | 0 | 3 | 0 |
| Robert Firth | Forward | 17 | 2 | 1 | 0 | 18 | 2 |
| Frank Foxall | Forward | 21 | 3 | 1 | 0 | 22 | 3 |
| Walter Freeman | Forward | 4 | 1 | 0 | 0 | 4 | 1 |
| George Gallimore | Forward | 18 | 1 | 0 | 0 | 18 | 1 |
| Thomas Greer | Forward | 1 | 0 | 0 | 0 | 1 | 0 |
| Jack Hall | Forward | 19 | 13 | 2 | 1 | 21 | 14 |
| Thomas Jones | Forward | 28 | 11 | 0 | 0 | 28 | 11 |
| Jack Kidd | Forward | 26 | 2 | 2 | 0 | 28 | 2 |
| Bernard Lowe | Forward | 2 | 0 | 0 | 0 | 2 | 0 |
| Jack McKay | Forward | 15 | 2 | 2 | 0 | 17 | 2 |
| Charlie Millington | Forward | 25 | 2 | 1 | 0 | 26 | 2 |
| Bert Powell | Forward | 4 | 1 | 1 | 0 | 5 | 1 |
| Jack Wilcox † (Note: Wilcox retired during the season because of injury.) | Forward | 2 | 0 | 0 | 0 | 2 | 0 |

== See also ==
- Birmingham City F.C. seasons

== Sources ==
- Matthews, Tony (1995). Birmingham City: A Complete Record. Derby: Breedon Books. ISBN 978-1-85983-010-9.
- Matthews, Tony (2010). Birmingham City: The Complete Record. Derby: DB Publishing. ISBN 978-1-85983-853-2.
- Source for match dates and results: "Birmingham City 1910–1911: Results". Statto Organisation. Archived from the original on 4 March 2016.
- Source for lineups, appearances, goalscorers and attendances: Matthews (2010), pp. 266–67. Note that attendance figures are estimated.
- Source for kit: "Birmingham City". Historical Football Kits.
