= 1909–10 Birmingham F.C. season =

Birmingham F.C.
1909–10 season
- Chairman: Walter W. Hart
- Secretary-manager: Alex Watson
- Ground: St Andrew's
- Football League Second Division: 20th
- FA Cup: First round (eliminated by Leicester Fosse)
- Top goalscorer: League: Walter Freeman (10); All: Walter Freeman (10)
- Highest home attendance: 18,000 vs Oldham Athletic, 30 October 1909
- Lowest home attendance: 1,000 vs Blackpool, 27 November 1909
- Average home league attendance: 8,921
Team colours

The 1909–10 Football League season was Birmingham Football Club's 18th in the Football League and their 10th in the Second Division. They finished bottom of the 20-team division, three points adrift of safety, so had to apply for re-election to the league for the 1910–11 season. They led the voting, ahead of Huddersfield Town who were elected to the league to replace Grimsby Town, who had finished the season in 19th place, above Birmingham. Alex Watson stepped down as secretary-manager at the end of the season, to be succeeded by Bob McRoberts, who had played as a forward for the club for seven years, and who became their first full-time manager, with no secretarial duties. They also took part in the 1909–10 FA Cup, entering at the first round proper and losing in that round to Leicester Fosse.

Twenty-six players made at least one appearance in nationally organised first-team competition, and there were ten different goalscorers. Forward Charlie Millington played in 36 of the 39 matches over the season, and half-back Albert Gardner appeared in one fewer. Walter Freeman was leading scorer with 10 goals, all of which came in the league.

== Football League Second Division ==
Date	League position	Opponents	Venue	Result	Score F–A	Scorers	Attendance
4 September 1909	12th	Oldham Athletic	H	D	2–2	Millington, Beer	20,000
11 September 1909	19th	Barnsley	A	L	1–5	Chapple	3,000
13 September 1909	16th	Glossop	H	D	2–2	Lowe, Millington	3,000
18 September 1909	13th	Fulham	H	D	1–1	Chapple	12,000
25 September 1909	18th	Burnley	A	L	0–2		5,000
2 October 1909	17th	Leeds City	H	L	1–2	Freeman	14,000
9 October 1909	18th	Wolverhampton Wanderers	A	L	2–4	Buckley, Chapple	10,000
16 October 1909	17th	Gainsborough Trinity	H	W	5–0	Millington 2, Needham 3	10,000
23 October 1909	14th	Grimsby Town	A	W	2–0	Freeman, Wilcox	5,000
30 October 1909	15th	Manchester City	H	D	1–1	Freeman	18,000
6 November 1909	17th	Leicester Fosse	A	L	1–3	Freeman	10,000
13 November 1909	15th	Lincoln City	H	W	1–0	Needham	5,000
20 November 1909	16th	Clapton Orient	A	L	0–3		9,000
27 November 1909	17th	Blackpool	H	L	1–2	Chapple	1,000
4 December 1909	17th	Hull City	A	L	0–7		6,000
11 December 1909	17th	Derby County	H	L	1–3	Freeman	5,000
18 December 1909	17th	Stockport County	A	D	1–1	Lappin	4,000
25 December 1909	19th	Glossop	A	L	1–4	Chapple	5,000
27 December 1909	19th	West Bromwich Albion	A	L	1–3	Millington	12,104
28 December 1909	19th	Bradford Park Avenue	H	L	0–1		15,000
1 January 1910	19th	West Bromwich Albion	H	L	0–1		15,500
8 January 1910	19th	Oldham Athletic	A	D	1–1	Lappin	8,000
22 January 1910	19th	Barnsley	H	W	2–1	Freeman, Chapple	5,000
29 January 1910	19th	Fulham	A	D	0–0		10,000
12 February 1910	19th	Leeds City	A	L	1–2	Freeman	10,000
19 February 1910	19th	Wolverhampton Wanderers	H	W	1–0	Freeman	2,000
26 February 1910	19th	Gainsborough Trinity	A	L	0–1		3,000
28 February 1910	17th	Burnley	H	W	2–1	Chapple, Freeman	1,000
5 March 1910	17th	Grimsby Town	H	L	2–4	Needham, Chapple	14,000
12 March 1910	19th	Manchester City	A	L	0–3		15,000
19 March 1910	17th	Leicester Fosse	H	W	2–1	Burton, Buckley	10,000
26 March 1910	18th	Lincoln City	A	L	2–3	Burton, Millington	5,000
28 March 1910	19th	Bradford Park Avenue	A	L	0–5		8,000
2 April 1910	19th	Clapton Orient	H	L	1–2	Burton	8,000
9 April 1910	19th	Blackpool	A	L	0–2		3,000
16 April 1910	19th	Hull City	H	L	0–2		8,000
23 April 1910	20th	Derby County	A	L	1–3	Millington	5,000
30 April 1910	20th	Stockport County	H	W	3–0	Freeman, Millington, Lowe	3,000

=== League table (part) ===
Final Second Division table (part)
Pos	Club	Pld	W	D	L	F	A	GA	Pts
16th	Clapton Orient	38	12	6	20	37	60	0.62	30
17th	Leeds City	38	10	7	21	46	80	0.57	27
18th	Gainsborough Trinity	38	10	6	22	33	75	0.44	26
19th	Grimsby Town	38	9	6	23	50	77	0.65	24
20th	Birmingham	38	8	7	23	42	78	0.54	23
Key	Pos = League position; Pld = Matches played; W = Matches won; D = Matches drawn; L = Matches lost; F = Goals for; A = Goals against; GA = Goal average; Pts = Points								
Source									

== FA Cup ==
Round	Date	Opponents	Venue	Result	Score F–A	Scorers	Attendance
First round	15 January 1910	Leicester Fosse	H	L	1–4	Lappin	15,119

== Appearances and goals ==
This table includes appearances and goals in nationally organised competitive matches – the Football League and FA Cup – only.
For a description of the playing positions, see Formation (association football)#2–3–5 (Pyramid).
Players marked † left the club during the playing season.

Players' appearances and goals by competition
Name	Position	League		FA Cup		Total	
Name	Position	Apps	Goals	Apps	Goals	Apps	Goals
Arthur Box	Goalkeeper	24	0	1	0	25	0
Jack Dorrington	Goalkeeper	14	0	0	0	14	0
William Carrier	Full back	7	0	0	0	7	0
Walter Corbett	Full back	9	0	0	0	9	0
Josiah Preston	Full back	7	0	0	0	7	0
Frank Stokes	Full back	20	0	1	0	21	0
Walter Wigmore	Full back	9	0	0	0	9	0
Frank Womack	Full back	22	0	1	0	23	0
Billy Beer	Half back	6	1	0	0	6	1
Frank Buckley	Half back	25	2	1	0	26	2
Thomas Daykin	Half back	23	0	1	0	24	0
Albert Gardner	Half back	34	0	1	0	35	0
William McCourty	Half back	1	0	0	0	1	0
James Moles	Half back	27	0	0	0	27	0
Frederick Banks	Forward	1	0	0	0	1	0
James Bumphrey	Forward	7	0	1	0	7	0
John Burton	Forward	4	3	0	0	4	3
Frederick Chapple	Forward	31	8	1	0	32	8
Robert Firth	Forward	8	0	1	0	9	0
Walter Freeman	Forward	33	10	1	0	34	10
Harry King	Forward	9	0	0	0	9	0
Harry Lappin	Forward	11	2	1	1	12	3
Bernard Lowe	Forward	3	2	0	0	3	2
Charlie Millington	Forward	36	8	0	0	36	8
Jack Needham †	Forward	20	5	0	0	20	5
Jack Wilcox	Forward	27	1	0	0	28	1

== See also ==
- Birmingham City F.C. seasons
