= Walter Freeman =

Walter Freeman may refer to:

- Wally Freeman (athlete) (Walter Freeman, 1893–1987), British Olympic athlete
- Walter Jackson Freeman II (1895–1972), American physician, lobotomy specialist
- Walter Jackson Freeman III (1927–2016), American biologist, theoretical neuroscientist and philosopher
- Walter Freeman (footballer) (1887–?), English professional footballer
