= Gateshead A.F.C. =

Defunct association football club in England

Gateshead
- Full name: Gateshead Association Football Club
- Founded: 1899
- Dissolved: 1973
- Ground: Hartington Terrace; Stanhope Road (–1908); Horsley Hill (1908–1930); Redheugh Park (1930–1973); Gateshead Youth Stadium (1973)
- 1972–73: Midland League, 9th
Home colours

Gateshead Association Football Club was a football club based in Gateshead, County Durham, England. The club was formed in South Shields in 1899 as South Shields Adelaide Athletic. After success in the North Eastern League prior to World War I, they were voted into the Football League in 1919. Financial problems in the late 1920s saw the club relocate to Gateshead in 1930, adopting the name of their new town. They remained in the Football League until 1960, when they were surprisingly voted out of the Football League and replaced by Peterborough United, despite not having had to apply for re-election since 1937. They subsequently played in regional leagues before folding in 1973. In order to replace them, another South Shields club was then moved to Gateshead, becoming Gateshead United.

== History ==
=== South Shields ===
The club was established in 1899 by Jack Inskip and was named South Shields Adelaide Athletic after the Adelaide Street area of the town where the founders were from. Success in their early years saw the club win the South Shields Junior Alliance, the 'A' Division of the South Shields Juvenile League, the Shields & District League in 1904–05 and then the Tyneside Junior League. In 1905 they were founders of the Tyneside League and were its inaugural champions. After retaining the title the following season, they joined the Northern Alliance in 1907. After finishing fourth in their first season, they were accepted into the North Eastern League. The club were runners-up in their first season in the league.

In 1910 the club was renamed South Shields after it became a limited company. Former England international Arthur Bridgett was appointed manager in 1912 and they were runners-up again in 1912–13, and applied for election to the Football League. However, they failed to receive a single vote. The following season saw them win the league title, after which they applied for Football League membership again, receiving a single vote. The club retained the league title the following season; another attempt at gaining entry to the Football League was more successful as they finished third with 11 votes, but the two clubs up for re-election, Leicester Fosse and Stoke received 33 and 21 votes respectively. The club's two championship winning seasons saw them lose only four matches and score 293 goals in 76 games. During World War I the club played in the Tyneside Combination, which they won in 1915–16, and the Northern Victory League.

When football resumed after World War I, the Football League was expanded by four clubs. South Shields applied and with 28 votes, they were elected to the Football League Second Division. The club's first seven seasons saw them finish in the top half of the table every season except 1922–23. However, after finishing nineteenth in 1926–27, they ended the following season bottom of the table and were relegated to the Third Division North. With the club suffering from financial problems, in 1930 they relocated to nearby Gateshead and were renamed Gateshead Association Football Club.

=== Gateshead ===
In August 1930, Gateshead A.F.C. started a new era when 15,545 supporters watched them beat Doncaster Rovers 2–1. In 1931–32 Gateshead missed out on promotion on goal average, finishing runners-up to Lincoln City. With the club's performances in decline thereafter, they finished second-from-bottom in 1936–37 and were forced to seek re-election. However, they were easily re-elected, winning 34 votes to the 12 received by the most successful non-League club, Shrewsbury Town. The club's fortunes improved after World War II and they were runners-up again in 1949–50, but there was still only one promotion place. In the 1950s the club enjoyed some relatively successful FA Cup runs; after reaching the fourth round in 1951–52 season, the following season saw them reach the quarter-finals. The run included a third round win over Liverpool, before wins over Hull City and Plymouth led to a quarter final match at home to Bolton, with a crowd of 17,692 seeing the away team win 1–0. During this time the club regularly included the brothers Tom and Jack Callender, whose combined appearances for Gateshead established a record for the most by two brothers at a single club.

In 1958 the Football League was restructured, with the regional Third Divisions reorganised into Division Three and Division Four. A fourteenth-place finish in 1957–58 saw Gateshead placed in Division Four. In 1959–60 they finished in the bottom four of Division Four, forcing them to seek re-election. Despite not finishing bottom and having only had to face re-election on one previous occasion, the club received fewer votes than non-League Peterborough United and were voted out of the league.

Gateshead subsequently dropped into the Northern Counties League, a newly-formed replacement for the North Eastern League (which later adopted the name of its predecessor). Playing alongside South Shields, a club formed in 1936 to replace them when they had moved to Gateshead, they finished fourth in the League and won the League Cup in their first season. They applied to rejoin the Football League, but received only three votes, well below the 32 received by Hartlepools United, the worst-placed Football League club. Another attempt at the end of the 1961–62 season saw them receive four votes, again well short of re-entry. In 1962 they switched to the North Regional League, which was largely composed of reserve teams of Football League clubs, and again put themselves forwards for the Football League elections at the end of the 1962–63 season, receiving four votes again. Despite winning the league in 1963–64, they again only won four votes in the Football League election process. Further attempts in 1965 (four votes) and 1966 (one vote) were also unsuccessful. In 1968 the club were founder members of the Northern Premier League. However, after finishing bottom of the table in 1969–70, they dropped into the Wearside League, replacing their reserve team. The club were Wearside League runners-up in 1970–71 and after another failed attempt to re-enter the Football League (receiving no votes) subsequently joined the Midland League. However, after two seasons the club folded in 1973.

History was repeated the following year as the new South Shields club was moved to Gateshead to become Gateshead United.

=== Reserve team ===
South Shields Adelaide Reserves were champions of the Shields and District League in 1905–06 and 1906–07, before joining the Tyneside League in 1908. They then switched to the Wearside League in 1909. They were runners-up in 1910–11, but left at the end of the 1911–12 season, returning to the Tyneside League. Echoing the success of the first team, they won back-to-back Tyneside League titles in both 1913–14 and 1914–15. When the club was elected to the Football League, the reserve team took over from the first team in the North Eastern League, which they won in 1923–24 and finished as runners-up in 1928–29.

After becoming Gateshead reserves in 1930, the reserves remained in the North Eastern League. They were runners-up in 1947–48, but along with the other Football League reserve teams, they transferred to the North Regional League in 1958. The reserves rejoined the Wearside League in 1967, where they played until being replaced by first team in 1970.

== Ground ==
South Shields Adelaide initially played on a pitch at Hartington Terrace, before moving to Stanhope Road. In 1908 they moved to Horsley Hill. The club's record attendance of 24,348 was set for an FA Cup fifth round match against Swansea Town on 19 February 1928.

When the club relocated to Gateshead, they played at Redheugh Park until 1973, when they moved briefly to the Gateshead Youth Stadium, before folding later in the year.

== Honours ==
- North Eastern League
  - Champions 1913–14, 1914–15
  - League Cup winners 1960–61
- North Regional League
  - Champions 1963–64
- Tyneside Combination
  - Champions 1915–16
- Tyneside League
  - Champions 1905–06, 1906–07
- Shields & District League
  - Champions 1904–05
- Durham Challenge Cup
  - Winners 1910–11, 1913–14
- Black Cup
  - Winners 1912–13, 1913–14
- Ingham Infirmary Cup
  - Winners 1913–14

== Records ==
- Best FA Cup performance: Quarter-finals, 1952–53
- Most appearances: Jack Callender, 470 (1946–1958)

== See also ==
- Gateshead A.F.C. players
- Gateshead A.F.C. managers
