= James Moles =

English footballer

Personal information
- Full name: James Moles
- Date of birth: 1884
- Place of birth: Tottenham, England
- Date of death: 7 November 1915 (aged 30–31)
- Place of death: Lillers, France
- Position: Left half

Senior career*
Years	Team	Apps	(Gls)
- Asplin Rovers
1900–1902	Tottenham Hotspur	4	(0)
–1909	Leyton		
1909–1911	Birmingham	33	(0)
- Leyton
- Edmonton
- Rotherham Town
- * Club domestic league appearances and goals

James Moles (1884 – 7 November 1915) was an English professional footballer who played in the Football League for Birmingham as a left half. His style of play was described as "aggressive".

== Career ==
Moles played for Southern League clubs Tottenham Hotspur and Leyton, before joining Second Division club Birmingham in 1909, as cover for Frank Buckley. He made his debut in a 2–2 home draw with Glossop on 13 September 1909, replacing Buckley as the team's centre half. In the second half of the 1909–10 season, he played regularly in his preferred position of left half. Moles' aggressive style cost him his place and he returned to London local football in 1911.

== Personal life ==
Moles gave a false age when he attested in the Militia in February 1900 and was discharged after 48 days. Moles served as a lance corporal in the Middlesex Regiment during the First World War and died of wounds at No. 9 Casualty Clearing Station, Lillers on 7 November 1915. He was buried in Lillers Communal Cemetery.

== Career statistics ==
Appearances and goals by club, season and competition
Club	Season	League			FA Cup		Total	
Club	Season	Division	Apps	Goals	Apps	Goals	Apps	Goals
Birmingham	1909–10	Second Division	27	0	0	0	27	0
Birmingham	1910–11	Second Division	6	0	0	0	6	0
Career total			3	0	0	0	33	0
