= Josiah Preston =

English footballer

Personal information
- Full name: Josiah Preston
- Date of birth: 1885
- Place of birth: Derby, England
- Date of death: Unknown
- Position: Right back

Senior career*
Years	Team	Apps	(Gls)
- Derby Midland
1905–1908	Burton United		
1908–1910	Birmingham	7	(0)
1910–19??	Halesowen		
- * Club domestic league appearances and goals

Josiah Preston (1885 – after 1909) was an English professional footballer born in Derby who played in the Football League for Birmingham.

Preston played for Derby Midland and Burton United before joining Birmingham in 1908. Described as "a strong and solid reserve", he was one of several full backs vying to succeed Frank Stokes and Watty Corbett, who were coming to the end of their careers. He had a run of seven games in the 1909–10 season, beginning with a 3–0 defeat at Clapton Orient on 20 November 1909, but returned to non-league football the following year with Halesowen.
