= Lobley Hill =

Suburb of Gateshead, Tyne and Wear, England

Coordinates: 54.9396°N 1.6375°W

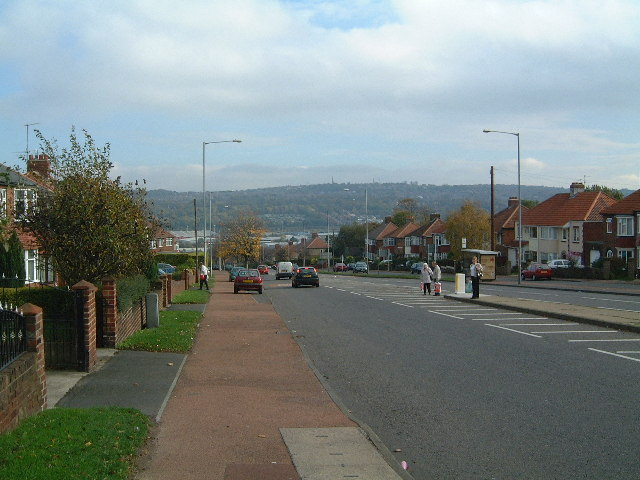
Lobley Hill

Lobley Hill is located in the west of the old County Borough of Gateshead within the Metropolitan Borough of Gateshead in Tyne and Wear, North East England having been previously part of the parish of Whickham.

In its Demographic Profile for the Lobley Hill Plan Area produced in 2008 the Metropolitan Borough of Gateshead quoted the 2001 census showing Lobley Hill had a population of around 6,199 of which 48% were males and 52% were females.

Later at the 2011 Census, the ward was called Lobley Hill and Bensham. The population of this Gateshead MBC ward was 10,698.

== Development of the community ==
The current Lobley Hill is defined by its boundaries as it has grown to fill the hillside while development along its eastern edge has encroached significantly since the first of the present housing was built in 1930s. The River Team lies just beyond what would have been considered a part of Lobley Hill separating it from the Teams, Bensham and Saltwell, Tyne and Wear areas of Gateshead but the development of the Team Valley Trading Estate hardened that boundary while the eventual building and upgrading of the A1 in Newcastle upon Tyne has ensured a definite edge.

The southern neighbours are long enclosed farmland and estates which include Ravensworth Castle (Tyne and Wear).

The western boundary is part of an industrial history of coal mining, railways and shipping. The waggonway forming that boundary links the collieries at Tanfield and Marley Hill to the River Tyne which have been developed over preceding centuries with the Causey Arch at its southern end and the iconic Dunston Staiths at the northern terminus. The distinction between Lobley Hill and Dunston, Tyne and Wear that the waggonway provided has eroded as housing developed to the west of the waggonway filling the area between the two communities.

The Lobley Hill built within the pre-1974 boundaries of the old County Borough used three distinctive sets of street names in the areas of domestic housing, in addition to the longstanding Lobley Hill Road, Consett Road and Coach Road.

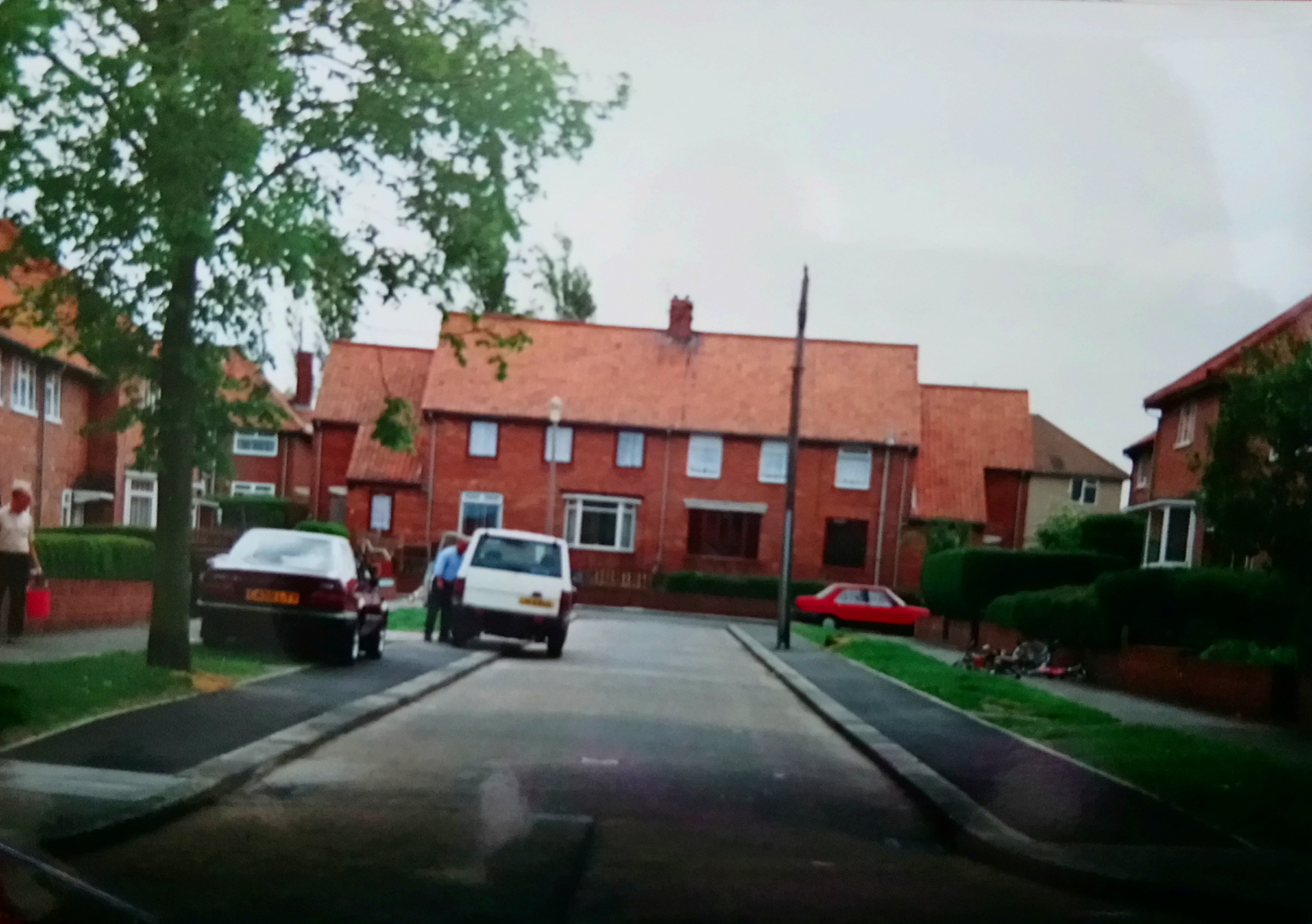
Coanwood Gardens in 1990

The initial housing took the names of trees, or more specifically their wood, on the south side of Lobley Hill Road while the south west has location names from Northumberland. The north side takes the names of ranges of British hills. Oakfield Road seems not quite to belong to any of these groups.

As the first census to identify residents shows, the original location and population was a single farm in the parish of Whickham and some distance from the boundary with the town of Gateshead.

Lobley Hill served as the location of heavy anti-aircraft battery "Tyne F" during World War II. It included a command post, four 4.5-inch gun emplacements and two magazines. It was manned by 296 Battery of the 66th Royal Artillery Regiment in May 1940, and by 176 Battery of the 63rd Royal Artillery Regiment in December 1940. Some parts of the battery's structure were still on the site in the 1960s, although it was later demolished to make way for building development.

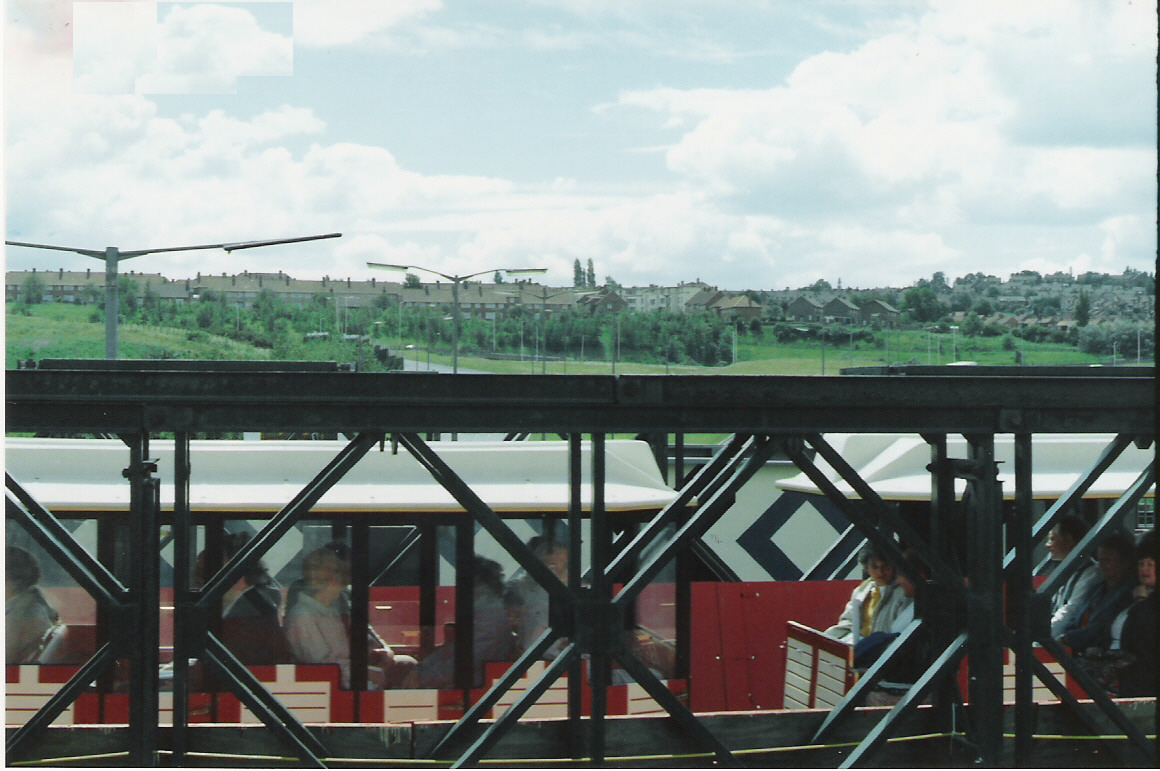
Lobley Hill from Low Teams pedestrian bridge National Garden Festival in 1990

The area was known for some time as the Gun Site long after the military withdrew. Some of the Army Huts were put into immediate post-war use as Council housing prior to extensive building works while other parts remained in use as the first primary school until Rothbury Gardens site was developed and continued as classrooms as a part of the primary school for several years after that building was opened.

One hut was the branch library on the main road until replaced by the new building and for several years the site was used for part of the pedestrian foot bridge.

== Education ==
The first primary school for Lobley Hill was a section of the Gun Site installation behind the west end of Oakfield Road at its highest point of the hill. The second was subsequently built on Rothbury Gardens and opened around 1952 but has been replaced at the same location.

Secondary education arrived in 1960 with a school built to the west of the waggonway on Whickham Highway. Housing has been built on that site since it closed in 1990.

There are two schools in Lobley Hill. Emmanuel College is a City Technology College and offers schooling for 11–18 years old from a wide area of Western Gateshead and the West End of Newcastle. Lobley Hill primary school offers schooling for 4–11 years old and includes a nursery school.

There is also Hillside Pre-school nursery run in the All Saints Church building. And there are local courses run at the Lobley Hill Youth and Community Centre.

== Churches ==
There are two churches in Lobley Hill. All Saints’ Church is Anglican, the older of the two. The Immaculate Heart Of Mary Church is a Roman Catholic church. There used to be a Methodist chapel on Beechwood Gdns but this building now no longer exists.

== Emmanuel House ==
On a street in Lobley Hill lies the Hospice Emmanuel House, fronted by long-time devout Catholic, Christine Deponio. The hospice itself is operated within her house, along with Husband Raymond, and sons Ryan and Lee Deponio, often performing fund-raising activities for clients and visitors to the house. Emmanuel House deals with local people who have been touched by cancer. As well as being a trained holistic therapist and a black belt in karate, Christine Deponio is also completely blind, as is her husband Raymond. Obviously all she has achieved with Emmanuel house and also being very musically talented is a massive achievement considering this disability.

== Recreation and local events ==
It has a recently constructed park, called Watergate Forest Park, built on reclaimed land on the site of the former Watergate Colliery which may have been among some of the first places where industrial coal mining methods were used.

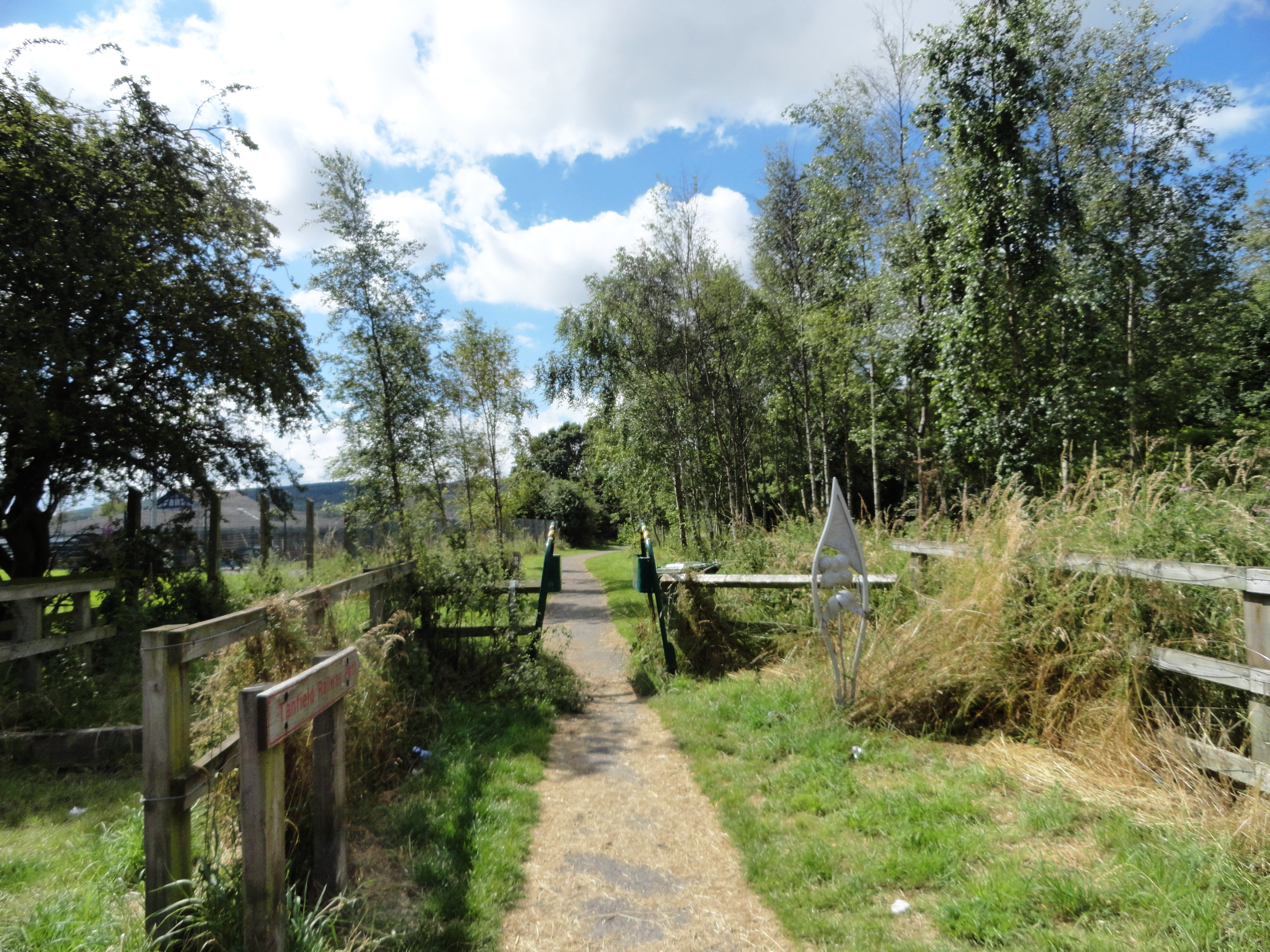
Path into Watergate Country Park

Lobley Hill hosted the annual Gateshead Flower Show.

In July 2008, the first Lobley Hill Festival was held, this is to be an annual event.

There is a 9-hole pitch and putt golf course and driving range facility located at Beggars Wood.

Lobley Hill is the home of youth football club Rutherford United with football facilities including full sized and 5 or 6 a side football pitches.

== Famous residents ==
- Gateshead footballer, coach and manager Tom Callender
- Liberty X band member, Michelle Heaton, attended Emmanuel College.
- Footballer and football manager Ian Branfoot was a pupil at the Primary School.
- Bob Fuller CEO Hutchison 3G UK Limited, was a pupil at the Primary School

== History ==
Lobley Hill has been shown on maps over a period of time.

The Ordnance Survey taken in 1857 for the map published in 1862 shows Lobley Hill marked at a junction just to the east of the signal box on the Tanfield Branch of the North Eastern Railway against a small group of buildings. These appear to be the buildings occupied according to the 1939 Register, and still standing in 1950s before clearance to make way for the branch library.

Also high on the actual hill to the south is Green's Farm on the lane going to Streetgate.

Further down the hill to the east at a crossroads that may be familiar as the Coach Road there are a group of buildings on the south east corner which may have been standing into 1960s or 1970s being a bookmakers and Bushells greengrocery. On the north west corner is a wooded area. The wood is marked Nor Wood and the buildings opposite Norwood. The general area within which these appear is shown as Farnacres.

Both Norwood and Farnacres have been used for names of local collieries just to the north in Low Teams.

The Team Colliery waggonway further to the east is also shown roughly where access to and from the eventual Norwood Coke Works could be seen. This area running north through Low Teams to Dunston Staiths was the site for the Gateshead Garden Festival in 1990 which was the fourth in a series of five National Garden Festival redevelopment projects in various parts of England, Scotland and Wales to reclaim industrial land with this held to have kick started a process which resulted in the Baltic centre, Sage Gateshead and the Millennium Bridge.

The 1857 survey is close to the decennial 1861 Census in the United Kingdom and confirms the name of Lobley Hill arises from that group of buildings. The name written both as Lobly Hill and Lobley Hill is in schedules for the parish of Whickham comprising Dunston, Farnacres, Norwood and large areas of the Teams.

It shows a farmer with agricultural labourers and the location of the house of a brakesman for the nearby top of the waggonway incline. A total of 29 people.

Resident	Relationship in Household	Marital Status	Gender	Age	Birth Year Implied	Occupation	Birthplace
Samuel Blenkinsop	Head	Married	Male	29	1832	Farmer 144 Acres Employing 3 Labourers	So Shields, Durham
Sarah Blenkinsop	Wife	Married	Female	29	1832	-	Lamesley, Durham
Isabella Blenkinsop	Daughter	-	Female	7	1854	-	Pelton, Durham
Mary Blenkinsop	Daughter	-	Female	6	1855	-	Pelton, Durham
John Blenkinsop	Son	-	Male	4	1857	-	Pelton, Durham
Sarah Blenkinsop	Daughter	-	Female	2	1859	-	Pelton, Durham
George Blenkinsop	Son	-	Male	1	1860	-	Whickham, Durham
Ann Kenedy	Servant	-	Female	19	1842	House Servant	Scotland
Jane Rutherford	Servant	-	Female	19	1842	Nurse	Lamesley, Durham
Thomas Crozier	Head	Married	Male	44	1817	Agricultural Labourer	Felton, Northumberland
Margaret Crozier	Wife	Married	Female	50	1811	-	Whittingham, Northumberland
Ann Crozier	Daughter	-	Female	19	1842	-	Earsdon, Northumberland
Jane Crozier	Daughter	-	Female	16	1845	-	Earsdon, Northumberland
Margaret Crozier	Daughter	-	Female	13	1848	-	Stannington, Northumberland
Francis Turnbull	Head	Married	Male	23	1838	Agricultural Labourer	Denton, Northumberland
Mary A Turnbull	Wife	Married	Female	25	1836	-	Ryton, Durham
Matthew Turnbull	Son	-	Male	1	1860	-	Ryton, Durham
Isabella Greener	N K	-	Female	10	1851	-	Ryton, Durham
Elizabeth Greener	N K	-	Female	45	1816	-	Unthank, Durham
John Robson	Head	Married	Male	57	1804	Agricultural Labourer	Ayton Banks, Durham
Isabella Robson	Wife	Married	Female	56	1805	-	Lumley, Durham
Elizabeth Robson	Daughter	Unmarried	Female	23	1838	-	Whickham, Durham
Margaret Robson	Daughter	Unmarried	Female	21	1840	-	Whickham, Durham
Henry Liddle	Boarder	Married	Male	25	1836	Game Keeper	Lamesley, Durham
Jane Liddle	Wife	Married	Female	26	1835	-	Whickham, Durham
John Brunton	Head	Married	Male	61	1800	Brakesman	Tanfield, Durham
Mary Brunton	Wife	Married	Female	64	1797	-	Whickham, Durham
Martha Brunton	Daughter	Unmarried	Female	20	1841	-	Whickham, Durham
Thomas Robson	Grandson	-	Male	5	1856	-	Newcastle, Northumberland

The United Kingdom census, 1841 also shows a farm and several agricultural labourers.

Names of Residents	Age of Male Residents	Age of Females Residents	Birth Year Implied	Occupation	Indicates Durham Birth
John Ord	30		1811	Ag Lab	No
Isabella Ord		35		1806	Durham
John Robson	35		1806	Ag Lab	Durham
Isabella Robson		25	1816		Durham
Barbara Robson		13	1828		Durham
Esther Robson		8	1833		Durham
Jane Robson		6	1835		Durham
Elizabeth Robson		3	1838		Durham
Margaret Robson		1	1840		Durham
George Robson	1 day		1840		Durham
Francis Armstrong	65		1776	Ag Lab	No
Margaret Armstrong		60	1781		No
Francis Armstrong	20		1821	J Blacksmith	Durham
Mary Taylor		80	1761	Farmer	No
John Taylor	55		1786	Ag Lab	Durham
Hannah Taylor		50	1791		Durham
Thomas Jobson	30		1811	Ag Lab	No
Isabella Jobson		30	1811		No
Jane Jobson		5		1836	No
Thomas Jobson	3		1838		No
Robert Jobson	9 months		1840	-	Durham

In the intermediate United Kingdom census, 1851 the schedules for Whickham parish do not identify locations of individual farms and houses. However, the agricultural labourer John Robson appears in all three while the railway brakesman John Brunton is in the same job in 1851 and 1861.

The Brunton family were still there in United Kingdom census, 1871 while he appears to be working on the waggonway while the Blenkinsop farm had increased in size but was in the same hands.

Resident	Relationship in Household	Marital Status	Gender	Age	Birth Year Implied	Occupation	Birthplace
Samuel Blenkinsop	Head	Married	Male	39	1832	Farmer 314 Acres	Simonside, Durham
Sarah Blenkinsop	Wife	Married	Female	39	1832	Farmer's Wife	Lamesley, Durham
Isabella Blenkinsop	Daughter	Unmarried	Female	17	1854	Scholar	Pockerley, Durham
Mary Blenkinsop	Daughter	Unmarried	Female	16	1855	Scholar	Pockerley, Durham
John N Blenkinsop	Son	Unmarried	Male	14	1857	Scholar	Pockerley, Durham
Sarah Blenkinsop	Daughter	Unmarried	Female	12	1859	Scholar	Pockerley, Durham
George Blenkinsop	Son	-	Male	10	1861	Scholar	Lobley Hill, Durham
Lydia J Blenkinsop	Daughter	-	Female	9	1862	Scholar	Lobley Hill, Durham
Samuel H Blenkinsop	Son	-	Male	7	1864	Scholar	Lobley Hill, Durham
Jonathan M P Blenkinsop	Son	-	Male	1	1870	-	Lobley Hill, Durham
Margaret Allen	Servant	-	Female	37	1834	Farm Servant Indoor	Aberdeen, Scotland
William Potts	Head	Married	Male	35	1816	Ag Lab	Pontland, Northumberland, England
Ann Potts	Wife	Married	Female	51	1820	-	Stamfordham, Northumberland, England
William Potts	Son	Unmarried	Male	14	1857	Ag Lab	Gateshead, Durham, England
Joseph Potts	Son	Unmarried	Male	8	1863	Scholar	Newburn, Northumberland, England
Isaac Bell	Lodger	Unmarried	Male	26	1845	Waggon Man	Shields, Durham, England
John Walls	Head	Married	Male	37	1834	Ag Lab	Hallgarth, Durham, England
Margaret Walls	Wife	Married	Female	40	1831	-	Bp Wearmouth, Durham, England
John W Walls	Son	Unmarried	Male	12	1859	Scholar	Whickham, Durham, England
William Walls	Son	Unmarried	Male	7	1864	Scholar	Whickham, Durham, England
Mathew W Graham	Head	Married	Male	26	1845	Ag Lab	Mickley, Northumberland, England
Frances Graham	Wife	Married	Female	25	1846	-	Hexham, Northumberland, England
Mary J Graham	Daughter	-	Female	6	1865	-	So Shields, Durham, England
John Brunton	Head	Married	Male	68	1803	Brakesman	Tanfield, Durham
Mary Brunton	Wife	Married	Female	72	1799	-	Gateshead, Durham
Martha Brunton	Daughter	Unmarried	Female	27	1844	-	Whickham, Durham

The 1857 map was revised about 1894/1895 and republished a few years later.

The area is still showing as entirely rural and there have been no further developments beyond the farms at Lobley Hill, Green's Farm and Norwood although there is an area near the waggonway cottage shown as a coal depot. This is how the area remained for another 30 years.

== Housing development ==
The progress of development can be seen in a photograph (Reference No: GL011742) on Gateshead Libraries Local Studies of the Team Valley and Lobley Hill in 1935. This shows the properties from the 1862 map on Norwood Farm with newer housing on Lobley Hill Road, Coach Road, Elmwood Gardens, and Beechwood Gardens where year of construction is shown on the property once used as a local clinic. There is still a semblance of woodland in the area seen then as Nor Wood.

The 1939 Register shows that further development had added housing to the north side of Lobley Hill Road which appears complete starting with number 404, the newsagents and shop that was subsequently lost to demolition when the A1 road was first built through the Team Valley. Oakfield Road is partially developed at this time.

On the south side the Waggon Team Inn is shown in this Register although not seen in the 1935 photograph. Lobley Hill Road is only built as far as number 439 running east to west. In addition to extending both Elmwood and Beechwood housing had been added in Thornwood, Elderwood, Oakwood and Pinewood.

The south west area shows housing developed along Rothbury, Mitford, Meldon, Alwinton, Cragside, Belsay, Belford and the road to Streetgate shown as Sunniside Road as well as the only pre-war building on Lobley Hill Road west of Rothbury Gardens.

The Lobley Hill Farmhouse is still occupied as are the nearby properties seen in previous census.
