= A1 in Newcastle upon Tyne =

Historic routes of part of a major road in N. England

The A1 road around Gateshead and Newcastle upon Tyne after arriving from the south as the A1(M) from its origin in London, currently runs from the A1(M) terminus at Birtley. It then swings to the west of both Gateshead and Newcastle via Coal House, Lobley Hill, Metrocentre, Swalwell, Blaydon Bridge, West Denton, Fawdon and Wideopen to Seaton Burn interchange before continuing north towards Edinburgh.

However, the A1 has followed a number of different routes in the Newcastle area, matching road developments aimed at reducing traffic congestion.

== Historic routes ==
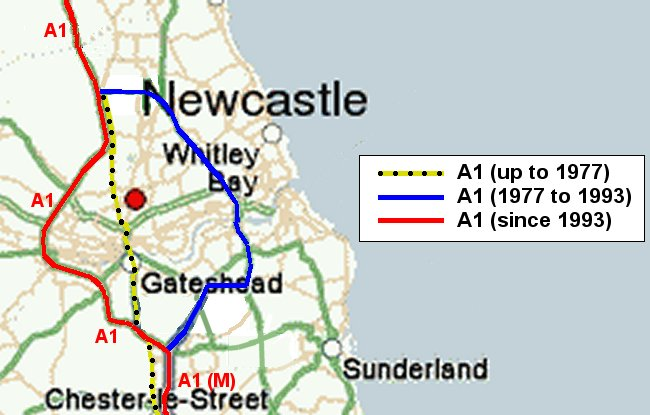
Historical routes of the A1 road and motorway in and around the Newcastle upon Tyne area.

=== Pre-1977 ===
The Great North Road and later the first incarnation of the A1 passed directly through Low Fell, Gateshead, Newcastle upon Tyne, Gosforth and Wideopen before rejoining the current A1 at Seaton Burn. The Great North Road was effectively diverted from the Swing Bridge to the Tyne Bridge when it opened on 25 February 1928, the A1 passing up Pilgrim Street and Northumberland Street.

When John Dobson Street opened in May 1970, most of the A1 traffic flowed away from the congested Northumberland Street. Then later, the first incarnation of Newcastle's Central Motorway built during the 1970s, opening in 1975, and passing just to the east of Newcastle City Centre, was initially numbered A1(M), before being renumbered the A6127(M) then the A167(M).

The portion of Great North Road through Gateshead and Newcastle has had a number of designations since it ceased being the A1 in 1977. Between 1977 and 1993, it was numbered A6127 between Birtley and Newcastle (the Newcastle Central Motorway being renumbered A6127(M) at this time) and A6125 between Newcastle and Seaton Burn—both road numbers are now redundant. Since 1993, the Birtley to Newcastle section has formed part of the A167 (the Central Motorway being renumbered A167(M)) and the Newcastle to Seaton Burn A6125 section has been the B1318.

=== 1977 to 1993 ===
After the opening of the Tyne Tunnel on 19 October 1967, the main route for traffic around Gateshead and Newcastle was diverted to the east. With completion of the A1(M) through County Durham in the 1970s, from 1977 onward the A1 ran as the A1(M) from Birtley past the north of Washington to the Newcastle Road / Leam Lane junction near Wardley (this section is now numbered A194(M)). It then ran east to Testo's Roundabout near West Boldon, following what is now a section of the A184. At Testos Roundabout, the A1 turned north following what is now the northern section of the A19 towards Jarrow and the Tyne Tunnel.

North of the Tyne Tunnel, the A1 passed through Howdon, before it continued in a north-westerly direction, through North Tyneside past Killingworth and Cramlington, rejoining the current A1, just north of Newcastle at Seaton Burn. Again, this section of road has been redesignated A19.

The section of road now forming the A19 between Testo's Roundabout and Seaton Burn was numbered the A108 (encompassing also the A19 Sunderland bypass) prior to it being numbered the A1 then A19 as detailed above.

=== 1993 onwards ===
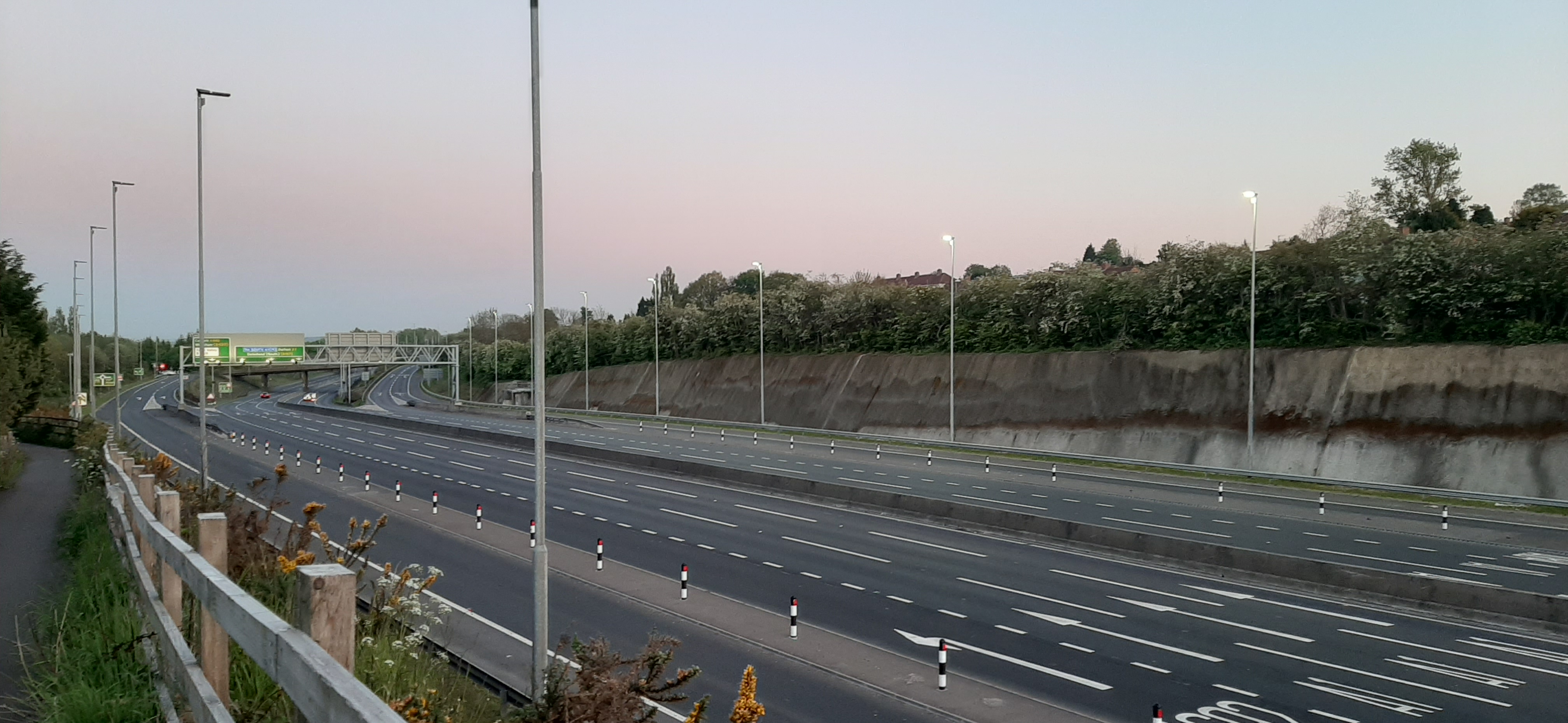
The Gateshead Western Bypass (A1)

The A1 officially assumed its western route in 1993, with completion of the Newcastle Western Bypass and opening of the Blaydon Bridge on 3 December 1990. The Gateshead Western Bypass, forming the southern part of this western route, was renumbered from A69 to its current A1 number

== Related changes to the A1 in Yorkshire and County Durham ==
Historically, the A1 followed its current route to just north of Boroughbridge, then following the route of the current A168 at Dishforth to Topcliffe (south west of Thirsk. It then followed the route of the current A167, crossing the A61 near Carlton Miniott, then continuing as the A167 via Kirby Wiske, Northallerton, Great Smeaton, Dalton-on-Tees to the border between North Yorkshire and County Durham, crossing the Tees at Croft-on-Tees.

Beyond Croft-on-Tees, the original A1 continued to follow the current route of the A167 through Darlington, Durham, and Chester-le-Street before reaching Birtley. Until 1993, the Chester-le-Street to Birtley section was the southern portion of the A6127 before being renumbered A167.

This section is now bypassed by the A1(M) from Dishforth to Birtley. The Dishforth to Barton section was dual carriageway trunk road numbered A1 until the Dishforth to Leeming section was upgraded to motorway in 2012, with the Leeming to Barton upgrade finally being completed in 2018.
