= Crosby Henderson =

English footballer (1885–1970)

Personal information
- Full name: Crosby Gray Henderson
- Date of birth: 12 May 1885
- Place of birth: South Hylton, England
- Date of death: 27 April 1970 (aged 84)
- Place of death: Sunderland, England
- Position: Full back

Senior career*
Years	Team	Apps	(Gls)
- Hylton Rangers
- Hylton Star
1906–1908	Newcastle United	0	(0)
1908–1910	Grimsby Town	65	(0)
1910–1911	Birmingham	6	(0)
1911–1912	Brighton & Hove Albion	12	(0)
1912–1913	Luton Town		
- * Club domestic league appearances and goals

Crosby Gray Henderson (12 May 1885 – 27 April 1970) was an English professional footballer who made 71 appearances in the Football League playing as a left back for Grimsby Town and Birmingham. He was on the books of Newcastle United without appearing for their first team, and played Southern League football for Brighton & Hove Albion and Luton Town.

== Life and career ==
Crosby Gray Henderson was born on 12 May 1885 in South Hylton, which was then in County Durham. He was a younger child of Thomas Henderson, a blacksmith by trade, and his wife Frances. He was apprenticed as a ship plater, and played local football for Hylton Rangers and Hylton Star before joining Football League First Division club Newcastle United in May 1906. He continued working in the shipyards while with Newcastle, never played for their first team, and moved on to Grimsby Town of the Second Division in May 1908.

Henderson played 65 league games for Grimsby over two seasons, earning himself a reputation as a solid defender, but left the club when they failed to be re-elected to the Football League. He joined Birmingham, who had finished below Grimsby but whose application for re-election had been successful. He went straight into the starting eleven, but lost his place after six games, and the form, consistency and fitness of the young Frank Womack meant he never regained it.

At the end of the 1910–11 season, he left for Brighton & Hove Albion of the Southern League. Both Grimsby and Birmingham had used him at left back, but he was capable of playing on either side, and it was as a right back that he made his 12 appearances for Brighton. He was released at the end of the season, and joined Luton Town, whose local newspaper described him as "a big, strong and very steady fellow, and a good kick." He began the season in the first team, but fell out of favour, and in August 1913 he was reported to be advertising for an engagement.

Henderson married Ellen Appleton in 1909. He died in Sunderland on 27 April 1970 at the age of 84.

== Career statistics ==
Appearances and goals by club, season and competition
Club	Season	League			FA Cup		Other		Total	
Club	Season	Division	Apps	Goals	Apps	Goals	Apps	Goals	Apps	Goals
Grimsby Town	1908–09	Second Division	37	0	1	0	—		38	1
Grimsby Town	1909–10	Second Division	28	0	1	0	—		29	0
Grimsby Town	Total		65	0	2	0	—		67	0
Birmingham	1910–11	Second Division	6	0	0	0	—		6	0
Brighton & Hove Albion	1911–12	Southern League Division One	12	0	0	0	1 (Note: Appearance in Southern Professional Charity Cup)	0	13	0
Career total			83	0	2	0	1	0	86	0

== Sources ==
- Carder, Tim; Harris, Roger (1997). Albion A–Z: A Who's Who of Brighton & Hove Albion F.C. Hove: Goldstone Books. ISBN 0-9521337-1-7.
- Joyce, Michael (2004). Football League Players' Records 1888 to 1939. Nottingham: SoccerData. ISBN 978-1-899468-67-6.
- Matthews, Tony (1995). Birmingham City: A Complete Record. Derby: Breedon Books. ISBN 978-1-85983-010-9.
