= Walter Freeman (footballer) =

English footballer (1884–1971)

Personal information
- Full name: Walter Freeman
- Date of birth: 21 January 1884
- Place of birth: Handsworth, England
- Date of death: 2 December 1971 (aged 87)
- Place of death: Birmingham, England
- Height: 5 ft 8 in (1.73 m)
- Position: Forward

Senior career*
Years	Team	Apps	(Gls)
–1904	Aston Manor		
1904–1905	Lowestoft Town		
1905–1906	Aston Villa	0	(0)
1906–1909	Fulham	57	(22)
1909–1911	Birmingham	37	(11)
1911–1914	Stalybridge Celtic		
- * Club domestic league appearances and goals

Walter Freeman (21 January 1884 – 2 December 1971) was an English professional footballer who played as an inside forward or centre forward. He scored 21 goals from 58 appearances in the Football League playing for Fulham and Birmingham. He was on the books of Aston Villa without appearing for their first team, and played non-league football for Lowestoft Town and Stalybridge Celtic.

== Personal life ==
Freeman was born in 1884 in Handsworth, which was then in Staffordshire. His father, Thomas Holte Freeman, was a jeweller, and his mother, Sarah, was a draper. At the time of the 1891 census, he was the eighth of ten children living in the parental home. The ninth, Bert, became a prolific goalscorer for Woolwich Arsenal, Everton, Burnley and Wigan Borough, and played five times for England.

Before taking up football full-time, Freeman had trained and worked as an electrician, and described himself as such when he married Catherine Harriett Whiteman in 1907; by the time of the 1911 Census, the couple had three children. The 1939 Register finds Freeman still working as an electrician. He, his wife, and two daughters of working age were living in Moor Park Road, Northfield, Birmingham. Freeman was still resident at that address when he died in December 1971 at the age of 87.

== Football career ==
Freeman attended Gower Street School in Aston, whose football team won the district schools' title in both of the two years that Freeman was a member. He played youth football for Aston Manor – Aston Villa's nursery club – before signing amateur forms for Lowestoft Town. While a Lowestoft player, he represented Suffolk County in a match against Norfolk. After trials with Aston Villa's reserve team, Freeman turned professional in February 1904 with the Football League First Division club, where his brother Bert was already on the books. Freeman played for the reserves, but never broke through to the first team, and when Bert joined Woolwich Arsenal that November, Freeman followed him to London a few weeks later when he signed for Fulham of the Southern League. He scored 10 goals from 28 matches to help Fulham win the 1906–07 Southern League title, after which they were elected to the Football League Second Division. Freeman made his Football League debut on the opening day of Fulham's first season at that level, and in the next match, a 1–0 win away to Derby County on 7 September 1907, he scored both his and Fulham's first ever Football League goal. He played five matches in September, and did not return to the league side until January 1909, when a run of seven goals in six matches earned him a regular place in the team until the end of the season.

Freeman began the 1909–10 season back in the reserves, scored a hat-trick against Arsenal Reserves in a South-Eastern League match, and was then transferred to another Second Division club, Birmingham, against whom he had scored twice the previous season. He missed only one match of what remained of Birmingham's 1909–10 season, initially playing at centre forward and then switched to inside right, and scored 10 goals, which was enough to make him the club's top scorer. They finished bottom of the table, and had to apply for re-election to the League. With the arrival of forwards including Jack Kidd, Thomas Jones and the prolific Jack Hall, Freeman played little in 1910–11.

Ahead of the 1911–12 season, Freeman joined Stalybridge Celtic, newly professional and admitted to the Lancashire Combination Second Division. He helped them win that division, after which he and they spent two seasons in the Central League, although the second half of his 1913–14 season was affected by injury.

== Career statistics ==
Appearances and goals by club, season and competition
Club	Season	League			FA Cup		Total	
Club	Season	Division	Apps	Goals	Apps	Goals	Apps	Goals
Fulham	1905–06	Southern League Division One	8	2	0	0	8	2
Fulham	1906–07	Southern League Division One	28	10	4	1	32	11
Fulham	1907–08	Football League Second Division	5	2	0	0	5	2
Fulham	1908–09	Football League Second Division	16	8	2	2	18	10
Fulham	Total		57	22	6	3	63	25
Birmingham	1909–10	Football League Second Division	33	10	1	0	34	10
Birmingham	1910–11	Football League Second Division	4	1	0	0	4	1
Birmingham	Total		37	11	1	0	38	11
Career total			94	33	7	3	101	36

== Sources ==
- Joyce, Michael (2004). Football League Players' Records 1888 to 1939. Nottingham: SoccerData. ISBN 978-1-899468-67-6.
- Matthews, Tony (1995). Birmingham City: A Complete Record. Derby: Breedon Books. ISBN 978-1-85983-010-9.
- Matthews, Tony (2010). Birmingham City: The Complete Record. Derby: Derby Books. ISBN 978-1-85983-853-2.
