= Horace Bailey =

English footballer (1881–1960)

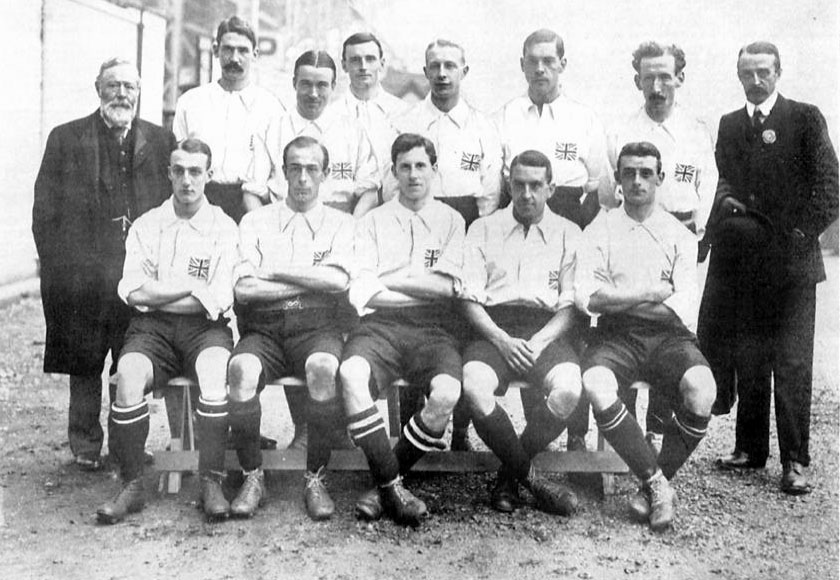
- In Standing Players, from left to right 5th no

Personal information
- Full name: Horace Peter Bailey
- Date of birth: 3 July 1881
- Place of birth: Derby, England
- Date of death: 1 August 1960 (aged 79)
- Place of death: Biggleswade, England
- Position: Goalkeeper

Senior career*
Years	Team	Apps	(Gls)
1899–1900	Derby County	0	(0)
1900	Crich		
1901–1904	Ripley Athletic		
1904–1907	Leicester Imperial		
1907–1909	Leicester Fosse	68	(0)
1909	Northern Nomads		
1909	Derby County	3	(0)
1910	Blackburn Rovers	0	(0)
1910	Stoke	1	(0)
1910–1912	Birmingham	50	(0)

International career
1908–1913	England amateur	8	(0)
1908	England	5	(0)
Medal record
Men's football
Representing Great Britain
Olympic Games
Gold medal – first place	1908 London	Team competition
- * Club domestic league appearances and goals

Horace Peter Bailey (3 July 1881 – 1 August 1960) was an English amateur footballer who competed in the 1908 Summer Olympics and 1912 Summer Olympics.

== Career ==
He was born in Derby and was the goalkeeper of the English team, which won the gold medal in the football tournament. He also won five caps for the senior national side between March and June 1908.

Bailey made more than 100 appearances in the Football League.

== Career statistics ==
=== Club ===
Appearances and goals by club, season and competition
Club	Season	League			FA Cup		Total	
Club	Season	Division	Apps	Goals	Apps	Goals	Apps	Goals
Leicester Fosse	1907–08	Second Division	33	0	2	0	35	0
Leicester Fosse	1908–09	First Division	20	0	0	0	20	0
Leicester Fosse	1909–10	Second Division	15	0	0	0	15	0
Derby County	1909–10	Second Division	3	0	0	0	3	0
Stoke	1910–11	Birmingham & District League / Southern League Division Two	1	0	0	0	1	0
Birmingham	1910–11	Second Division	12	0	0	0	12	0
Birmingham	1911–12	Second Division	29	0	2	0	31	0
Birmingham	1912–13	Second Division	9	0	1	0	10	0
Career total			122	0	5	0	127	0

=== International ===
National team	Year	Apps	Goals
England	1908	5	0
Total		5	0
