= Jack McKay (footballer, born 1885) =

English footballer

Personal information
- Full name: John McKay
- Date of birth: 1885
- Place of birth: Hebburn, England
- Date of death: Unknown
- Position: Outside left

Senior career*
Years	Team	Apps	(Gls)
- Hebburn Argyle
1910–1912	Birmingham	19	(2)
1912–19??	Blyth Spartans		
- * Club domestic league appearances and goals

John McKay (1885 – after 1911) was an English professional footballer who made 19 appearances in the Football League playing for Birmingham.

McKay was born in Hebburn, County Durham. He began his football career with Hebburn Argyle before joining Birmingham of the Football League Second Division in 1910. He marked his debut for the club, at home to Bradford on 10 September 1910, by scoring the only goal of the game, and played fairly regularly while Frank Foxall, also an outside left, was being tried at inside forward. The experiment failed, Foxall returned to the wing and McKay lost his place. When Foxall left, McKay played the first few games of the 1911–12 season, but lost his place again, this time to the newly arrived Jimmy Conlin, and in 1912 he returned to the north-east to join Blyth Spartans.
