= James Bumphrey =

English footballer (1884–1946)

Personal information
- Full name: James Bumphrey
- Date of birth: 4 May 1884
- Place of birth: Pegswood, England
- Date of death: 20 January 1946 (aged 61)
- Place of death: Ashington, England
- Height: 5 ft 7 in (1.70 m)
- Position: Wing half

Senior career*
Years	Team	Apps	(Gls)
- Bedlington United
190?–1909	Ashington		
1909–1915	Birmingham	136	(7)
1915–19??	Durham City		
- * Club domestic league appearances and goals

James Bumphrey (4 May 1884 – 20 January 1946) was an English professional footballer who played 136 games and scored 7 goals in the Football League for Birmingham. He began his career as a forward, but most of his league football was played as a half back, primarily at left half.

== Life and career ==
Bumphrey was born in 1884 in Pegswood, near Morpeth in Northumberland, a son of James Bumphrey, a coal miner and one-time professional sprinter, and his wife Annie née Purvis. In 1901, the family was living in Ashington and the 16-year-old Bumphrey was working as a hanger-on in a coal mine. As an adult, Bumphrey stood 5 ft 7 in (1.70 m) in height, was heavily built, and according to his service record, had brown hair and eyes and a fresh complexion. He married Margaret Maud Spencer Haville at St James's Church, Benwell, in 1906; she was to divorce him in 1939.

Bumphrey played Northern Alliance football for Bedlington United and Ashington. He top-scored for Ashington in 1907–08, and joined Football League Second Division club Birmingham in January 1909. Having made his first appearance for the reserve team the previous week, Bumphrey made his Football League debut on 30 January, playing at inside right in a much-changed Birmingham team that drew 1–1 away to Burnley. He should have scored in the first half: having "received an excellent pass from the left wing, he beat [the full back] and practically had an open goal, but his shot went over." Bumphrey played in all but one of the remaining 12 league matches, either at inside or outside right, and his three goals included a match-winner at home to Leeds City when he chipped the ball over the goalkeeper's head from a narrow angle. Over the next 18 months, he played sporadically – seven matches in 1909–10, when Birmingham finished bottom of the league and had to apply for re-election, and four in 1910–11 – always in the forward line, where the Athletic News thought him not up to the task: "Bumphrey has more than once given the directors a pretty plain intimation that, while he is thoroughly good in the reserves he is by no means a shining light in Second League football."

In March 1911, he was brought into the side at wing half in place of the injured Albert Gardner, and rarely returned to the forward line. He missed six weeks in the middle of the 1911–12 season with a leg injury, came back in the previously "problem" position of left half, where his "consistently good form [did] much to add strength and reliability to the intermediate line", and played all but four matches in 1912–13. A Birmingham Gazette appraisal in December 1912 describes him as not just "a vigorous player, who can both take and give a knock", but also skilful in recovering the ball by anticipating his opponent's movements and quick to feed the ball forward. He was prepared to make an attack himself, possessed a powerful shot, and was willing to track back to support his full backs in time of need. "To sum up Bumphrey's play, one might say that he is a good, all-round half-back, and always reliable." Despite his lack of height, he headed the ball well.

Bumphrey missed a month of the 1913–14 season after playing the whole match against Notts County in September despite having sprained his ankle as he walked out onto the pitch. His first game back was a rough encounter away to Barnsley. After players had come close to blows, the referee warned that the next offender would be sent off. Bumphrey brought down an opponent, and despite, according to the Daily Citizen, his offence being "hardly as glaring as some others that had been committed", he was duly ordered off and suspended for 14 days. He finished the season with 23 league appearances, and continued at left half into the next. Influenza in October 1914 cost him his place, and a shoulder injury in December meant he played only seven times in 1915, taking his totals to 143 appearances in all competitions.

When the Football League was suspended because of the First World War, Bumphrey moved back to his native north-east where he was able to keep up his football in charity matches. From 1917 to 1919, he served as a stoker in the Royal Navy, including serving aboard HMS Princess Royal. The 1939 Register records Bumphrey lodging in the Dinsdale household in Ridsdale Square, Ashington, and working as a stoneman in a coal mine. He was still resident at that address when he died in 1946 at the age of 61.

== Sources ==
- Matthews, Tony (1995). Birmingham City: A Complete Record. Derby: Breedon Books. ISBN 978-1-85983-010-9.
