= Frederick Banks =

English footballer (1888–1957)

Fred Banks
Personal information
- Full name: Frederick William Banks
- Date of birth: 9 December 1888
- Place of birth: Aston, England
- Date of death: 16 January 1957 (aged 68)
- Place of death: Nottingham, England
- Height: 5 ft 8 in (1.73 m)
- Position: Outside forward

Senior career*
Years	Team	Apps	(Gls)
- Park Road
- Myrtle Villa
1909–1910	Birmingham	1	(0)
1910–191?	Stourbridge		
191?–1911	Wellington Town		
1911–1914	Nottingham Forest	56	(5)
1914–1915	Stalybridge Celtic		
1915–1920	Nottingham Forest	15	(0)
1920–192?	Worksop Town		
- * Club domestic league appearances and goals

Frederick William Banks (9 December 1888 – 16 January 1957) was an English professional footballer who made 72 appearances in the Football League playing for Birmingham and Nottingham Forest. He played as an outside forward.

== Life and career ==
Frederick William Banks was born on 9 December 1888 in Aston, which is now part of Birmingham. He played local football for teams including Park Road and Myrtle Villa before joining Second Division club Birmingham in 1909. He made his debut on 13 November 1909, deputising for Fred Chapple in a home game against Lincoln City which Birmingham won 1–0. This was the only first-team game he played for Birmingham.

Banks played non-league football for Stourbridge and Wellington Town and then returned to the Football League with Nottingham Forest. According to the Nottingham Evening News report of his debut,

He played a brilliant game, and he adapted himself to the methods of his colleagues as though he had been fully acquainted with their style of play for a long time. ... [He] showed a fine turn of speed, he controlled the ball excellently, his centring was thoroughly good, he shot for goal whenever there was the slightest chance, and he never hesitated to battle with all the opposition that came against him. And he beat the defenders four times out of five, despite the fact that they sometimes resorted to tactics that were not fair in order to outwit him.

In two spells with the club either side of a season with Stalybridge Celtic and interrupted by the First World War, Banks played 73 games in all competitions, before moving back to non-league with Worksop Town in 1920. He was still a Worksop player in March 1922, when he married; the 1939 Register lists him as a widower.

After his playing career ended, Banks became deputy to Tom Ratcliffe as Notts County's trainer, and took over after Ratcliffe resigned in March 1930. He was responsible for the fitness of the squad that won the 1930–31 Third Division South title and with it promotion to the Second Division. He held the post until May 1934, when the newly arrived manager, Charlie Jones, had him demoted to reserve trainer because he wanted to bring in his own man, Bill Seddon. Ahead of the 1936–37 season, Banks returned to Nottingham Forest as assistant trainer, and he remained with that club after the war as a member of the ground staff until taking retirement in March 1956.

Banks died in Nottingham on 16 January 1957.

== Sources ==
- Matthews, Tony (1995). Birmingham City: A Complete Record. Derby: Breedon Books. ISBN 978-1-85983-010-9.
