= Thomas Gibson (physician) =

English physician and anatomist (1647–1722)

Thomas Gibson, HonFRCP (1647–1722) was an English physician and anatomist.

== Life ==
Thomas Gibson was born at High Knipe, in the parish of Bampton, Westmoreland, in 1647. After attending Bampton school he was sent to Leyden University, where he graduated MD on 20 August 1675.

He was admitted a licentiate of the Royal College of Physicians on 26 June 1676, and an honorary fellow on 30 September 1680. He was a Presbyterian, and a visit which he and his second wife paid to his nephew John, provost of Queen's College, Oxford, is sourly described by Thomas Hearne.

On 21 January 1718–19 he was appointed physician-general to the army.

He died on 16 July 1722, aged 75, and was buried in the ground adjoining the Foundling Hospital belonging to St. George the Martyr, Queen Square.

== Family ==
He married, first, Elizabeth (1646–92), widow of Zephaniah Cresset of Stanstead St. Margaret's, Hertfordshire, and third daughter of George Smith of that place; and secondly, Anne (1659–1727), sixth daughter of Richard Cromwell, the Lord Protector, but left no issue. Edmund Gibson was his nephew and heir.

== Work ==
Gibson published The Anatomy of Humane Bodies epitomized, 8vo, London, 1682 (6th edition, 1703), compiled for the most part from Alexander Read's work, but long popular.

=== Editions ===
- The Anatomy of Humane Bodies epitomized. / Wherein all Parts of Man's Body, with their Actions and Uses, are Succinctly described, according to the newest doctrine of the most accurate and learned Modern Anatomists / By a Fellow of the College of Physicians, London. London, Printed by M. Flesher for T. Flesher, at the Angel and Crown in St. Paul's Church-Yard. MDCLXXXII [1682].
- The Anatomy of Human Bodies epitomiz'd. / Wherein all the Parts of Man's Body, with their Actions and Uses, are succinctly describ'd, according to the newest Doctrine of the most accurate and learned Modern Anatomists / The Third Edition, with the Addition of an Index. / By Tho. Gibson, M.D. and Fellow of the College of Physicians, London. London: Printed for Awnsham Churchil, at the Black Swan in Ave-Mary-Lane, 1688.
- The Anatomy of Humane Bodies epitomized. / Wherein all the Parts of Man's Body, with their Actions and Uses, are succinctly described, according to the newest doctrine of the most Accurate and Learned Modern Anatomists / The Fifth Edition, Corrected and Inlarged both in the Discourse and Figures. / By Tho. Gibson, M.D. Fellow of the Colledge of Physicians, London. London: Printed by T. W. for Awnsham and John Churchill, at the Black Swan in Pater-noster-Row, and sold by Timothy Childe, at the White-Hart, the West end of St. Paul's Churchyard, 1697.

=== Plates ===
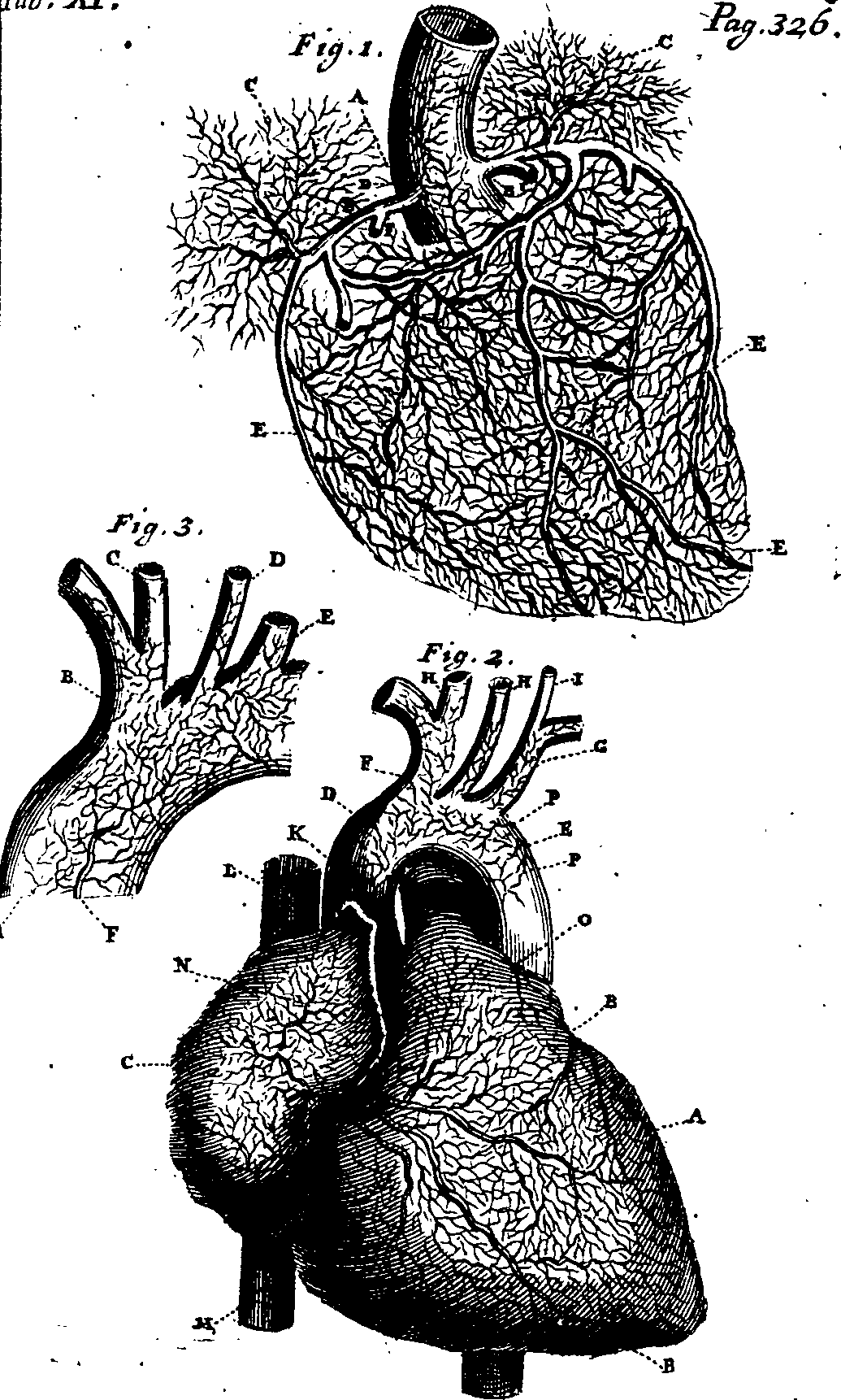

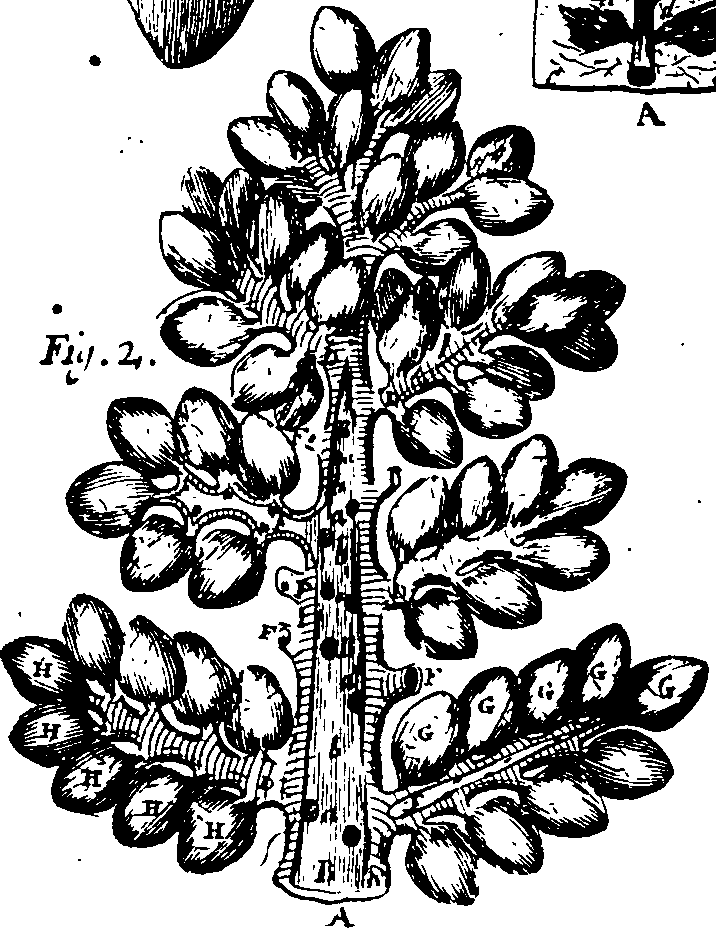

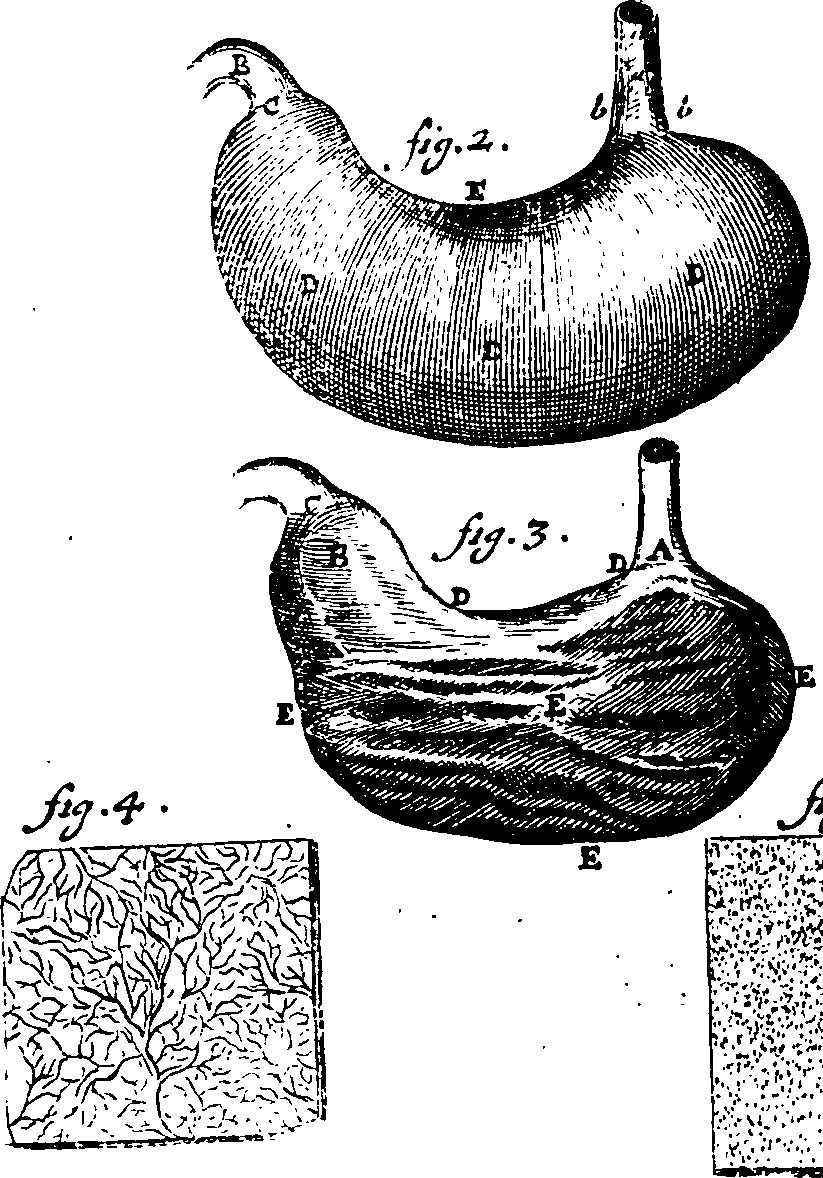

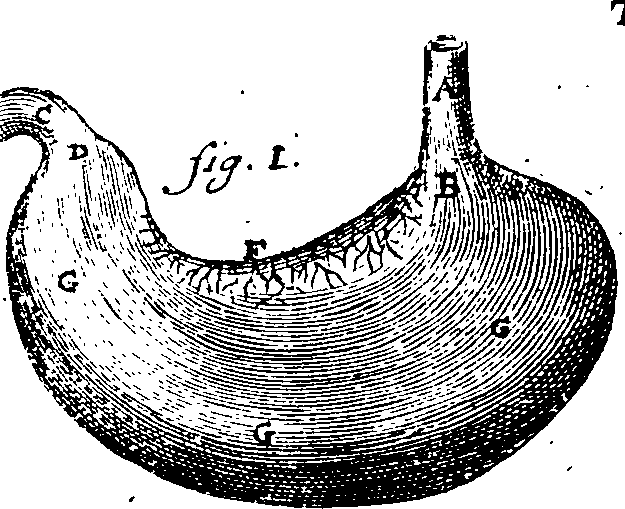

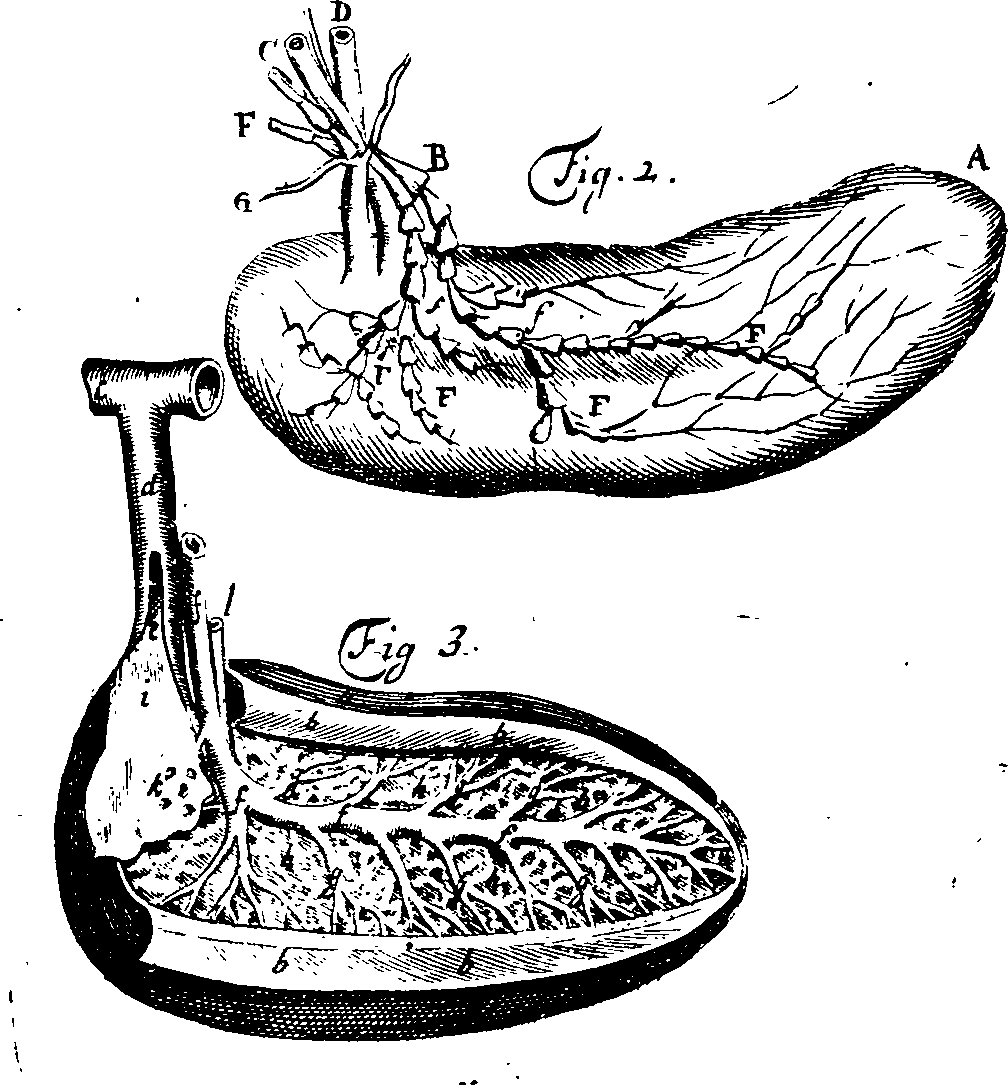

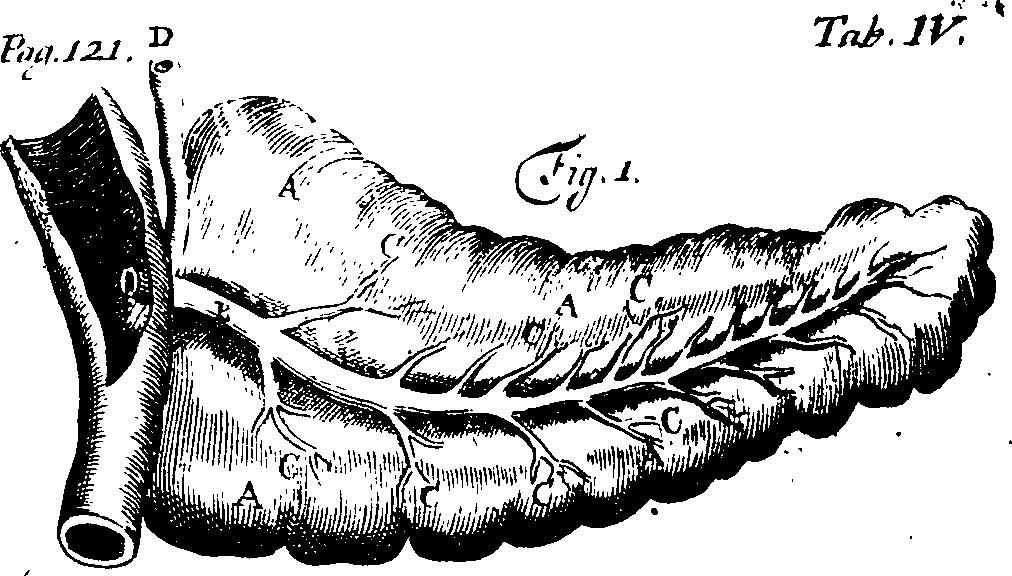

== Sources ==
- Atkinson, George (1849). The Worthies of Westmorland. Vol. 1. London: J. Robinson. pp. 142, 161, 164.
- Atkinson, George (1850). The Worthies of Westmorland. Vol. 2. London: J. Robinson. pp. 185–188.
- Bliss, Philip, ed. (1857). Reliquiae Hearnianae: The Remains of Thomas Hearne. Vol. 2. Oxford: James Wright. p. 105.
- Clutterbuck, Robert (1821). The History and Antiquities of the County of Hertford. Vol. 2. London: John Nichols and Son. pp. 97, 214.
- Goodwin, Gordon (1890). "Gibson, Thomas (1647-1722)" . In Stephen, Leslie (ed.). Dictionary of National Biography. Vol. 21. London: Smith, Elder & Co. p. 284.
- Goodwin, Gordon; Wallis, Patrick (2004). "Gibson, Thomas (1648/9–1722), physician". Oxford Dictionary of National Biography. Oxford University Press.
- Munk, William (1878). The Roll of the Royal College of Physicians of London. 2nd ed. Vol. 1: 1518 to 1700. London: Harrison and Sons. p. 413.
- "Thomas Gibson (b.1647 d.16 July 1722)". Inspiring Physicians. Royal College of Physicians. 2019. Retrieved 30 May 2022.
