= Jack Callender =

English footballer

Personal information
- Date of birth: 2 April 1923
- Place of birth: Wylam, England
- Date of death: 22 May 2001 (aged 78)
- Position: Wing half

Senior career*
Years	Team	Apps	(Gls)
1945–1958	Gateshead	471	(42)
1958	Consett		
- * Club domestic league appearances and goals

John W. "Jack" Callender (2 April 1923 – 22 May 2001) was an English professional football wing half of the 1940s and 1950s.

== Career ==
Born in Wylam, Callender began his career before World War II, in 1938 with Gateshead, who would be his sole Football League club. He went on to establish the club record for most appearances for the club in the Football League during his long stay; Callender is the record appearance holder for Gateshead with 511 (league and FA Cup). He made 471 Football League appearances, scoring 42 goals and 40 appearances in the FA Cup, scoring 7 goals.

At Gateshead, Callender and his brother Tom made 910 league appearances, a record for two brothers at the same club. After his departure from Gateshead Callender played for Consett for a while.

Callender died on 22 May 2001, aged 78.
