= Frank Foxall =

English footballer

Personal information
- Date of birth: 11 March 1883
- Place of birth: Sheffield, Yorkshire, England
- Date of death: 1968 (age 85)
- Place of death: Rotherham, West Riding of Yorkshire
- Position: Outside forward

Senior career*
| Years | Team | Apps | (Gls) |
- Roundel
| 1901–1902 | Wombwell Town | | |
| 1902–1903 | Doncaster Rovers | 12 | (2) |
| 1903–1907 | Gainsborough Trinity | 126 | (38) |
| 1907–1910 | Sheffield Wednesday | 45 | (9) |
| 1910–1911 | Birmingham | 21 | (3) |
| 1911–191? | Shrewsbury Town | | |
- * Club domestic league appearances and goals

Francis Foxall (11 March 1883 – 1968) was an English professional footballer who scored 52 goals in 204 appearances in the Football League playing for Doncaster Rovers, Gainsborough Trinity, Sheffield Wednesday and Birmingham. He played as an outside forward.

Foxall was born in Sheffield. He played football for Roundel and Wombwell Town before joining Doncaster Rovers of the Second Division in 1902. The following year Foxall moved on to Gainsborough Trinity, also of the Second Division, where he spent four years, scoring League goals at a rate close to one every three games. This earned him a move to established First Division club Sheffield Wednesday, on the verge of winning the 1907 FA Cup Final. Foxall scored twice in what remained of the 1906–07 season, and over the next three years averaged 15 first-team games a season. In April 1910 he moved on to Birmingham, on the verge of having to apply for re-election. Birmingham experimented with Foxall at inside forward with little success, and he soon returned to the wing, but after a year with the club he moved on again, this time to Shrewsbury Town.

On 12 November 1908, he was convicted of assault causing actual bodily harm for "maliciously assaulting" a man from Sheffield two months prior. He was fined £20 (equivalent to £2,000 in 2025).

He was married to Selena (or Selina) Green in 1903. He died in 1968 in Rotherham, West Riding of Yorkshire.
