= Tom Callender =

English footballer

Personal information
- Full name: Thomas Sanderson Callender
- Date of birth: 20 September 1920
- Place of birth: Wylam, England
- Date of death: 25 February 2002 (aged 81)
- Place of death: Lobley Hill, England
- Position: Centre half

Senior career*
Years	Team	Apps	(Gls)
19??–1937	Crawcrook Albion		
1937–1939	Lincoln City	23	(0)
1945–1956	Gateshead	439	(58)
- * Club domestic league appearances and goals

Thomas Sanderson Callender (20 September 1920 – 25 February 2002) was an English professional football centre half of the 1930s, 1940s and 1950s.

Callender began his career before the Second World War with local non-league side Crawcrook Albion before moving to Third Division North side Lincoln City. After the war, Callender moved to Gateshead where he made his name. Although playing in the lower divisions of the Football League Callender was considered worthy of a place in the England team by contemporaries. Indeed, such was the esteem in which his play was held that Gateshead turned down a £15,000 offer from Newcastle United for his services. Wolverhampton Wanderers manager Major Frank Buckley also allegedly made an undisclosed offer for the outstanding centre back. At Gateshead Callender and his brother Jack made 910 league appearances, a record for two brothers at the same club, plus 75 cup appearances between them. Callender scored 58 goals for Gateshead in 439 league appearances, scoring an additional 3 goals in 35 appearances in the FA Cup. Callender also captained the Third Division North XI v Third Division South XI.

On his retirement Callender managed Gateshead for a short period. He died on 25 February 2002 at Lobley Hill, Tyne and Wear.
