= Jack Kidd (Scottish footballer) =

Scottish footballer

Personal information
- Full name: John Kidd (Note: Many sources list him as John W. Kidd, but his birth, marriage, 1911 Census, and death records give plain John Kidd.)
- Date of birth: 27 August 1884
- Place of birth: Glasgow, Scotland
- Date of death: 1927 (aged 42)
- Place of death: Stourbridge, England
- Position: Inside forward

Senior career*
Years	Team	Apps	(Gls)
–	Maryhill		
1904–1910	Third Lanark	74	(15)
1906	→ Ayr Parkhouse (loan)		
1906–1908	→ Swindon Town (loan)	44	(7)
1910	→ St Johnstone (loan)		
1910–1912	Birmingham	40	(8)
1912–192?	Brierley Hill Alliance		
- * Club domestic league appearances and goals

John Kidd (27 August 1884 – 1927) was a Scottish professional footballer who played as an inside forward. He scored 8 goals in 40 appearances in the Second Division of the Football League playing for Birmingham.

Kidd was born in Glasgow, and played for Third Lanark (winning the Scottish Cup in 1905) and St Johnstone, as well as in the English Southern League for Swindon Town between 1906 and 1908, before returning to England to join Birmingham in November 1910. He went straight into the first team and played regularly until January 1912, making 44 appearances in all competitions. He then played for Brierley Hill Alliance in the Birmingham & District League. After retiring from professional football Kidd kept pubs in the Brierley Hill area. He died in 1927 at the age of 42.
