= William McCourty =

English footballer (1888–1917)

Personal information
- Full name: William McCourty
- Date of birth: 1888
- Place of birth: Carlisle, England
- Date of death: 10 December 1917 (aged 29)
- Place of death: West Flanders, Belgium
- Position: Left half

Senior career*
Years	Team	Apps	(Gls)
- North Seaton
1909–1910	Birmingham	1	(0)
1910–1915	Birmingham Corporation Tramways		
- * Club domestic league appearances and goals

William McCourty (1888 – 10 December 1917) was an English professional footballer who played in the Football League for Birmingham.

== Life and career ==
McCourty was born in late 1888 in Carlisle, Cumberland, to Scottish parents, John McCourty, who worked as a joiner, and his wife, Agnes. At the time of the 1901 Census, the 12-year-old McCourty was working as a draper's errand boy to help his two older brothers support their widowed mother and four younger siblings. He went on to work as a coal miner, and played minor football for North Seaton in the Wansbeck League before a trial with Football League Second Division club Birmingham led to a contract.

Commenting on one of the pre-season practice matches – a fund-raiser for the Birmingham Women's Hospital – the Birmingham Gazette wrote that McCourty, playing at left half, "was in his element. When acting in defence he was a veritable stumbling block, and well he might be, for Banks gave him a warm time. However, he acquitted himself creditably". McCourty made his club and Football League debut on 13 September 1909, deputising for the injured Tom Daykin in a home game against Glossop which finished as a 2–2 draw. He made no more first-team appearances, and was not re-engaged at the end of the season.

McCourty remained in the Birmingham area, found employment as a conductor for Birmingham Corporation Tramways, and played for its football team in the Birmingham Combination. He married Emily Brown, a cycle finisher, in 1912, and their son William Donald was born in late 1915, by which time McCourty had moved on to driving the trams. Emily's younger sister Amy married another Birmingham footballer, Alec McClure.

During the First World War, McCourty initially continued as a tram driver and played football in fund-raising matches (and appeared once for Birmingham in the wartime league). He then served as a gunner with 119th Siege Battery, Royal Garrison Artillery. He was killed in action in West Flanders on 10 December 1917, at the age of 29, and buried in Ypres Reservoir Cemetery. In November 2018, an oak tree was planted at Birmingham City's training ground in memory of McCourty and the five other Birmingham players who died serving their country during the First World War.

== Sources ==
- Matthews, Tony (1995). Birmingham City: A Complete Record. Derby: Breedon Books. ISBN 978-1-85983-010-9.
