= William Carrier (footballer) =

English footballer

Personal information
- Full name: William Carrier
- Date of birth: 1887
- Place of birth: Ashington, England
- Date of death: Unknown
- Place of death: County Durham, England
- Position: Full back

Senior career*
Years	Team	Apps	(Gls)
1904–1905	Manchester United	0	(0)
1905–1909	Merthyr Juniors		
1909–191?	Birmingham	7	(0)
–	Pontypridd		
1912–19??	Worcester City		
- * Club domestic league appearances and goals

William Carrier (1887 – after 1911) was an English professional footballer who played in the Football League for Birmingham.

Carrier was born in Ashington, Northumberland, but brought up in South Wales. He was on the books of Manchester United, but returned to junior football in Merthyr Tydfil without playing for United's first team. Because of his Welsh upbringing his name was suggested for selection for the Wales national football team until he was found to be English-born. Carrier signed for Birmingham in September 1909. He made his debut in the Second Division on 8 January 1910 playing at right back in a 1–1 draw away to Oldham Athletic, and played in six of the last eight games of the 1909–10 season. After leaving Birmingham he played for Pontypridd and Worcester City.

Although Bill Carrier had family in the North East, he was actually born in Huyton, near Prescot, Lancashire.

His service in the Great War is commemorated at www.prescot-rollofhonour.info
