= Albert Gardner =

English footballer

Personal information
- Full name: Albert Edward Gardner
- Date of birth: April 1887
- Place of birth: Kings Heath, Birmingham, England
- Date of death: April 1923 (aged 36)
- Place of death: Birmingham, England
- Height: 5 ft 8 in (1.73 m)
- Position: Wing half

Senior career*
| Years | Team | Apps | (Gls) |
| 190?–1908 | BSA Sports | | |
| 1908–1920 | Birmingham | 113 | (4) |
| 1914–???? | → King's Heath (loan) | | |
- * Club domestic league appearances and goals

Albert Edward Gardner (April 1887 – April 1923) was an English professional footballer who played as a wing half. Gardner, who was profoundly deaf, was spotted by Birmingham playing for BSA Sports in the Birmingham Works League. He went on to make 120 appearances in all competitions for Birmingham in eleven years. Gardner died in Birmingham in April 1923; his death, at the age of 36, was registered in the Kings Norton district, which covered much of south Birmingham.
