= Short (surname) =

Short is a surname of English origin. Notable people with this surname include:

- Alan Short (1920–2004), California legislator
- C. Alan Short (born 1955), British architect and academic
- Alfred Short (1882–1938), British labour unionist and politician
- Alice Butler-Short (1943–2021), Irish-American political activist
- Alma Short Lafferty (1854–1928), American suffragist and politician
- Andy Short (born 1991), English rugby player
- Anthony Short (born 1953), New Zealand cricketer
- Arnold Short (1932–2014), American basketball player
- Augustus Short (1802–1883), "Bishop Short", British-born Australian religious leader
- Basil Short (born 1991), South African rugby player
- Benjamin Short (1833–1912), English-born australian insurance salesman and congregationalist evangelist
- Bill Short (1937–2022), American baseball pitcher
- Bryon Short (born 1966), American politician
- Brandon Short (born 1977), American football player
- Casey Krueger (née Short, born 1990), American soccer player
- Charles Wilkins Short (1794–1863), American botanist
- Charlie Short, English footballer
- Chris Short (1937–1991), American baseball player
- Clare Short (born 1946), British politician
- Clarence Short (1873–1947), American college football coach and educator
- Clyde Short (1883–1936), Kansas politician
- Columbus Short (born 1982), American dance choreographer and actor
- Craig Short (born 1968), British football player
- Daniel Short (born 1961), American politician
- D'Arcy Short (born 1990), Australian cricketer
- Dewey Short (1898–1979), American politician
- Dorothy Short (1915–1963), American film actress
- Florence Short (1893–1946), American actress
- Ebony Short, American sewing manager
- Ellis Short (born 1960), American businessman
- Emile Short (born 1943), Ghanaian judge
- Emily Short, American writer of interactive fiction
- Esther Short (1806–1862), American settler, founder of Vancouver
- Frank Short (1857–1945), British printmaker
- Frank Hamilton Short (1862–1920), American lawyer and conservation advocate
- Gavin Short (born 1962), Falkland Islands politician
- Gene Short (1953–2016), American basketball player
- Gertrude Short (1902–1968), American film actress
- Graham Short (born 1946), English micro-artist
- Gregory Short (1938–1999), American classical music composer
- Harry Short (1864–1937), Canadian politician
- Harry Short (baseball) (1878–1954), American baseball player and manager
- Hassard Short (1877–1956), Broadway musical director
- J. D. Short (1902–1962), American Delta blues musician
- Jake Short (born 1998), US Television Actor
- Jane Short (aka Rachel Peace) (1881–after 1932), British feminist and suffragette, who was imprisoned and force-fed
- Jason Short (born 1978), American football player
- Jay Short (born 1939), American biochemist and biotech entrepreneur
- Jayden Short (born 1996), Australian footballer
- Joseph Short (1904–1952), American journalist
- Joseph A. Short, American college football coach
- Kawann Short (born 1989), American football defensive tackle
- Kayle Short (born 1973), Canadian hockey player
- Ken Short (1927–2014), Australian Anglican bishop
- Keith Short (1941–2020), British sculptor
- Kirby Short (born 1986), Australian cricketer
- Larry Short (born 1949), Canadian politician
- Laurie Short (1915–2009), Australian trade union leader
- Leonie Short (born 1956), Australian politician
- Lester L. Short (born 1933), American ornithologist
- Linda H. Short, American politician
- Lisa Spain Short, American tennis player
- Luke Short (1854–1893), American gunfighter
- Luke Short (writer) (1908–1975), American writer
- Marc Short (born 1970), American political advisor
- Marion Short (c. 1880–?), American dramatist
- Mark Short (born 1966), Australian Anglican bishop
- Martin Short (born 1950), Canadian actor and comedian
- Martin Short (author) (1943–2020), British documentary producer
- Mary Short (1802–1849), royal queen consort of Awadh
- Matthew Short (born 1995), Australian cricketer
- Mitch Short, Australian rugby player
- Nathaniel Short (born 1985), English footballer
- Nigel Short (born 1965), British chess player
- Nigel Short (singer), British choral singer
- Obadiah Short (1803–1886), British artist
- O'Day Short (1905–1946), American refrigerator engineer
- Oswald Short (1883–1969), co-founder of Short Brothers
- Patrick Short (fl. c. 1830), British-born religious leader
- Pauline Short Robinson (1915–1997), American librarian and civil rights activist
- Phil Short (born 1947), U.S. Army officer and Louisiana politician
- Philip Short (born 1945), British journalist and author
- Philip Short (chess player) (1960–2018), Irish chess player
- Philip Sydney Short (born 1955), Australian botanist
- Peyton Short (1761–1825), American land speculator and politician
- Purvis Short (born 1957), American basketball player
- Renée Short (1919–2003), British politician
- Roger Short (1944–2003), British diplomat
- Roy Hunter Short (1902–1994), American Methodist bishop
- Russell Short (born 1969), Australian paralympic athlete
- Sallyanne Short (born 1968), Welsh sprinter
- Shawn Short (born 1978), American dance choreographer
- Shelly Short (born 1962), American politician
- Sidney Howe Short (1857–1902), American inventor, professor, businessman
- Steve Short (born 1954), American ice hockey player
- Tom Short (born 1957), American Christian traveling evangelist
- Vicars Short, Canadian Anglican bishop
- Walter Short (1880–1949), American soldier
- Walter Cowen Short (1870–1952), American soldier
- Wilfrid Short (1870–1947), British civil servant
- Zack Short (born 1995), American baseball player

== Disambiguation pages ==
- Arthur Short (disambiguation)
- David Short (disambiguation)
- Don Short (disambiguation)
- Edward Short (disambiguation)
- George Short (disambiguation)
- Henry Short (disambiguation)
- Jack Short (disambiguation)
- James Short (disambiguation)
- John Short (disambiguation)
- Kevin Short (disambiguation)
- Michael Short (disambiguation)
- Patrick Short (disambiguation)
- Peter Short (disambiguation)
- Richard Short (disambiguation)
- Robert Short (disambiguation)
- Thomas Short (disambiguation)
- William Short (disambiguation)

== See also ==
- General Short (disambiguation)
- Senator Short (disambiguation)
- Short (disambiguation)
- Shortt (disambiguation)
- Short Brothers, British aerospace company
