= 1919–20 Birmingham F.C. season =

Birmingham F.C.
1919–20 season
- Chairman: Howard Cant
- Secretary-manager: Frank Richards
- Ground: St Andrew's
- Football League Second Division: 3rd
- FA Cup: Third round (eliminated by Liverpool)
- Top goalscorer: League: Bert Millard (14); All: Bert Millard (15)
- Highest home attendance: 47,000 vs Darlington, FA Cup 2nd round, 31 January 1920
- Lowest home attendance: 15,000 vs South Shields, 10 September 1919 Nottingham Forest, 10 March 1920
- Average home league attendance: 24,333
Home colours

The 1919–20 Football League season, the first to be played after the First World War, was Birmingham Football Club's 24th in the Football League and their 16th in the Second Division. They finished in third position in the 22-team division, eight points behind the promotion places. They also took part in the FA Cup, entering at the first round proper and losing to Liverpool in the third (last 16).

Twenty-eight players made at least one appearance in nationally organised first-team competition, and there were fourteen different goalscorers. Forward Johnny Crosbie was ever-present over the 45-match season. Harry Hampton was leading scorer with 16 goals, all of which came in the league.

== Football League Second Division ==
Date	League position	Opponents	Venue	Result	Score F–A	Scorers	Attendance
30 August 1919	7th	Hull City	H	W	4–1	Gibson, Walker, Godfrey, Whitehouse	20,000
1 September 1919	8th	South Shields	A	L	0–1		12,000
6 September 1919	11th	Hull City	A	D	0–0		10,000
10 September 1919	7th	South Shields	H	W	4–0	Millard 2, Morgan 2	15,000
13 September 1919	5th	Coventry City	H	W	4–1	Morgan, Whitehouse, Millard 2	20,000
20 September 1919	3rd	Coventry City	A	W	3–1	Millard 2, Whitehouse	16,000
27 September 1919	2nd	Huddersfield Town	H	W	4–2	Elkes 2, Whitehouse, Burkinshaw	20,000
4 October 1919	2nd	Huddersfield Town	A	D	0–0		6,000
11 October 1919	3rd	Blackpool	H	W	4–2	Walker, Whitehouse, Jones og, Elkes	16,000
18 October 1919	3rd	Blackpool	A	L	0–3		8,000
25 October 1919	7th	West Ham United	H	L	0–1		30,000
1 November 1919	6th	West Ham United	A	W	2–1	Short, Millard	20,000
8 November 1919	3rd	Wolverhampton Wanderers	H	W	2–0	Short 2	20,000
15 November 1919	2nd	Wolverhampton Wanderers	A	W	2–0	Millard, Short	14,000
22 November 1919	5th	Rotherham County	H	D	2–2	Morgan, Barton	20,000
29 November 1919	2nd	Rotherham County	A	W	3–0	Short, Millard 2	12,000
6 December 1919	2nd	Stoke	A	W	1–0	Short	15,000
13 December 1919	2nd	Stoke	H	W	2–1	Short 2	30,000
20 December 1919	2nd	Grimsby Town	A	W	3–0	Millard 2, Morgan	6,000
25 December 1919	2nd	Leicester City	A	L	0–1		20,000
26 December 1919	3rd	Leicester City	H	L	0–1		25,000
27 December 1919	2nd	Grimsby Town	H	W	4–0	Morgan, Elkes, Burkinshaw, Millard pen	20,000
3 January 1920	3rd	Bristol City	A	D	1–1	Millard	12,000
17 January 1920	3rd	Bristol City	H	W	1–0	Davies	30,000
24 January 1920	3rd	Stockport County	H	D	1–1	Elkes	30,000
4 February 1920	3rd	Barnsley	H	D	0–0		30,000
14 February 1920	2nd	Barnsley	A	W	5–0	Barton, Hampton 2, Gibson, Whitehouse	12,000
28 February 1920	2nd	Nottingham Forest	A	W	2–1	Hampton 2	9,000
6 March 1920	2nd	Lincoln City	A	D	2–2	Hampton, Lane pen	9,000
10 March 1920	2nd	Nottingham Forest	H	W	8–0	Hampton 4, Lane 2, Burkinshaw 2	15,000
13 March 1920	2nd	Lincoln City	H	W	7–0	Davies, Lane 3, Atkin og, Hampton, Whitehouse	30,000
15 March 1920	2nd	Stockport County	A	L	1–2	Robson og	5,000
20 March 1920	3rd	Bury	A	L	0–1		20,000
27 March 1920	3rd	Bury	H	L	0–2		30,000
3 April 1920	3rd	Port Vale	A	W	3–1	Hampton, Lane, Elkes	15,000
5 April 1920	3rd	Fulham	A	W	2–1	Russell og, Short	18,000
6 April 1920	3rd	Fulham	H	W	2–0	Jones 2	20,000
10 April 1920	3rd	Port Vale	H	W	3–0	Lane, Elkes 2	30,000
17 April 1920	3rd	Clapton Orient	A	L	1–2	Lane	18,000
24 April 1920	3rd	Clapton Orient	H	W	2–1	Short, Lane	20,000
26 April 1920	3rd	Tottenham Hotspur	A	D	0–0		35,000
1 May 1920	3rd	Tottenham Hotspur	H	L	0–1		40,000

=== League table (part) ===
Final Second Division table (part)
Pos	Club	Pld	W	D	L	F	A	GA	Pts
1st	Tottenham Hotspur	42	32	6	4	102	32	3.19	70
2nd	Huddersfield Town	42	28	8	6	97	38	2.55	64
3rd	Birmingham	42	24	8	10	85	34	2.50	56
4th	Blackpool	42	21	10	11	65	47	1.38	52
5th	Bury	42	20	8	14	60	44	1.36	48
Key	Pos = League position; Pld = Matches played; W = Matches won; D = Matches drawn; L = Matches lost; F = Goals for; A = Goals against; GA = Goal average; Pts = Points								
Source									

== FA Cup ==
Round	Date	Opponents	Venue	Result	Score F–A	Scorers	Attendance
First round	10 January 1920	Crystal Palace	H	W	2–0	Burkinshaw, Whitehouse	44,000
Second round	31 January 1920	Darlington	H	W	4–0	Millard, Whitehouse 3	47,000
Third round	21 February 1920	Liverpool	A	L	1–2	Barton	50,000

== Appearances and goals ==
This table includes appearances and goals in nationally organised competitive matches – the Football League and FA Cup – only.
For a description of the playing positions, see Formation (association football)#2–3–5 (Pyramid).
Players marked † left the club during the playing season.

Players' appearances and goals by competition
Name	Position	League		FA Cup		Total	
Name	Position	Apps	Goals	Apps	Goals	Apps	Goals
Dan Tremelling	Goalkeeper	42	0	3	0	45	0
William Ball	Full back	20	0	3	0	23	0
William Mumford	Full back	3	0	0	0	3	0
Jack Watson	Full back	2	0	0	0	2	0
Tom White	Full back	11	0	0	0	11	0
Alf Wilson	Full back	2	0	0	0	2	0
Frank Womack	Full back	39	0	3	0	42	0
Percy Barton	Half back	41	2	3	1	44	3
Tom Evans	Half back	6	0	0	0	6	0
Albert Gardner	Half back	1	0	0	0	1	0
Fred Hawley	Half back	3	0	0	0	3	0
Alec McClure	Half back	24	0	2	0	26	0
Joe Roulson	Half back	38	0	3	0	41	0
Laurie Burkinshaw	Forward	32	4	3	1	35	5
George Davies	Forward	16	2	0	0	16	2
Jack Elkes	Forward	16	8	1	0	17	8
Richard Gibson	Forward	10	2	2	0	12	2
Joby Godfrey †	Forward	3	1	0	0	3	1
Harry Hampton	Forward	10	11	1	0	11	11
Abe Jones	Forward	3	2	0	0	3	2
Joe Lane	Forward	14	10	0	0	14	10
Bert Millard	Forward	29	14	2	1	31	15
Billy Morgan	Forward	28	6	3	0	31	6
Jack Peart †	Forward	3	0	0	0	3	0
Archie Roe	Forward	3	0	0	0	3	0
James Short	Forward	16	10	1	0	17	10
Billy Walker	Forward	11	2	0	0	11	2
Jackie Whitehouse	Forward	36	7	3	4	39	11

== See also ==
- Birmingham City F.C. seasons
