= Ebony (given name) =

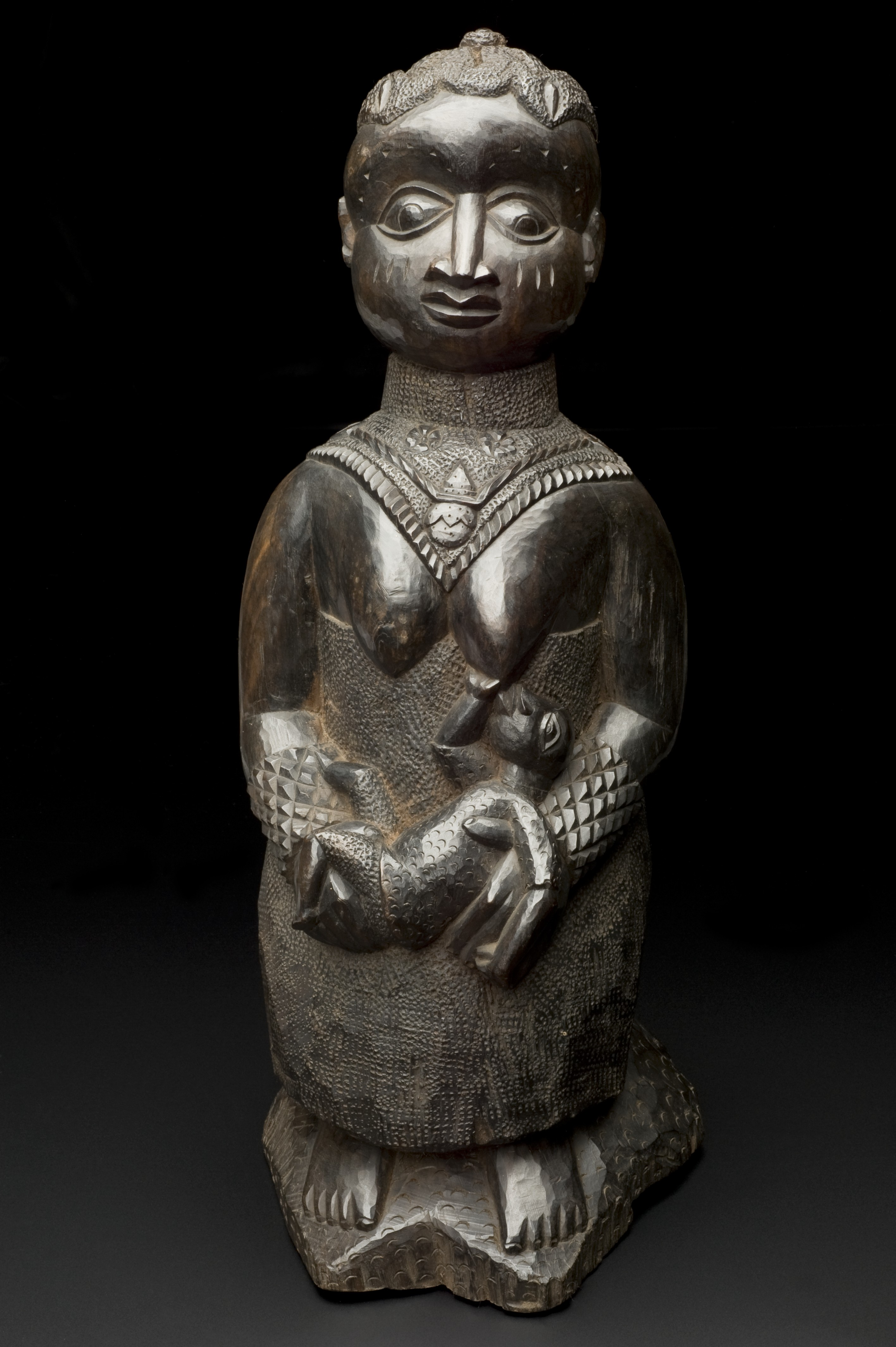
- A carved ebony figure of a breastfeeding woman, West Africa, 1890–1920.
- Gender: Feminine
- Language: English

Origin
- Meaning: ebony

Ebony is an English feminine given name often given in reference to the color black or to the type of wood. It has been particularly well used by Black people in the United States. It was among the one thousand most popular names for American girls between 1971 and 2005, but has since declined in usage. Spelling variants include Ebonee and Eboni.

== People ==
- Ebony Alleyne, English R&B and soul singer
- L. Ebony Boulware, American general internist, physician-scientist, and clinical epidemiologist
- Ebony Cham (born 2004), French singer
- Ebony Collins (born 1989), American sprinter
- Ebony Day (born 1993), English singer, songwriter, and YouTube personality
- Ebony Flowers, American prose writer and cartoonist
- Ebony Hoffman (born 1982), former professional basketball player and a current assistant coach for the Seattle Storm
- Ebony Hoskin (born 2003), Australian cricketer who currently plays for New South Wales Breakers in the Australian Women's National Cricket League
- Ebony Naomi Oshunrinde (born 1996), Canadian record producer, songwriter and record executive known professionally as WondaGurl
- Ebony Obsidian (born 1994), American actress
- Ebony Patterson (born 1981), Jamaican-born visual artist and educator based in the United States
- Ebony Rainford-Brent (born 1983), English former cricketer who is now a commentator and Director of Women's Cricket at Surrey
- Ebony Rolph (born 1994), Australian professional basketball player
- Ebony Salmon (born 2001), English professional footballer
- Ebony Satala (born 1989), Fijian rugby union player
- Ebony M. Scott (born 1974), American lawyer who serves as an Associate Judge of the Superior Court of the District of Columbia
- Ebony Short, American sewing manager
- Ebony Simpson (died 1992), Australian murder victim
- Ebony Stevenson (born 2009), Australian wheelchair basketball player
- Ebony Elizabeth Thomas, American writer and educator

== Fictional characters ==
- Ebony, the cat familiar of Marvel Comics character Agatha Harkness
- Ebony Dark'ness Dementia Raven Way, the protagonist of the Harry Potter-based fan fiction My Immortal

== See also ==
- Ebonee
- Eboni
- Iben (given name)
