= List of Sheffield United F.C. managers =

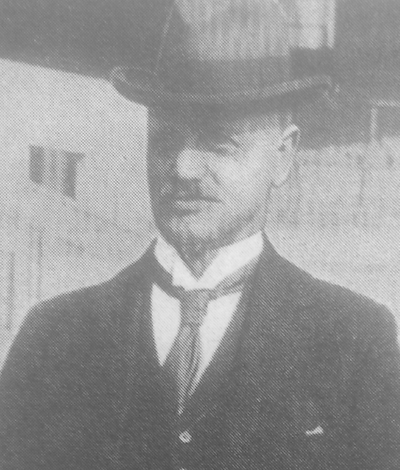
John Nicholson, Sheffield United's second manager

This is a chronological list of managers of Sheffield United, a football club based in Sheffield, England.

United were formed in 1889 as an offshoot of the already existing Sheffield United Cricket Club and committee member and club secretary JB Wostinholm was placed in charge of team affairs, thus becoming their first 'manager' (although his official title was 'Club secretary'.) The Blades have since had a further twenty eight full-time managers (discounting those appointed on an interim basis).

The club's most successful manager was John Nicholson who replaced Wostinholm in 1899 and who remained in the post until his death in 1932. Under Nicholson the Blades won the FA Cup four times and established themselves as one of the dominant forces in English football, although winning the Championship for a second time eluded them during that period.

Since Nicholson's death the club have appointed a succession of managers who have enjoyed varying levels of success while the team has generally remained in the top two divisions of English football. The exception was a period of gradual decline during the late 1970s which ultimately saw United relegated to the fourth tier under Martin Peters in 1981. The club recovered and returned to the top-flight in 1990 under Dave Bassett.

A period of relative stability came in 1999 under self confessed Blades fan Neil Warnock. He guided the team to two domestic cup semi-finals and a First Division play-off final in the 2002–03 season. Then in the 2005–06 season he guided the team back to the top-flight. They spent just one season in the Premier League and Warnock left the club following the club's relegation.

A chaotic 2010–11 season saw the Blades go through three managers, Kevin Blackwell, who was assistant manager at United under former manager Neil Warnock. Gary Speed and another self confessed Blades fan and Sheffield born Micky Adams as well as John Carver who took charge as acting manager for a number of games, the ultimate result of which saw the side relegated to League One.

The club remained in the third tier for five years under several managers; Former Sheffield Wednesday manager Danny Wilson, Nigel Clough and Nigel Adkins. Then in 2016 the club turned to Chris Wilder who was a former ball boy and former player as well as a Sheffield United fan. In his first season in charge he took the club back to the second tier finishing 1st with 100 points, a club record for highest points in a season.

In his second season he got United off to a great start. Having beaten city rivals Sheffield Wednesday with 4–2 at Hillsborough (the most goals the club have ever scored in a game at Hillsborough). The team were top of the league and looking for back to back promotions. However the team would finish the season in 10th place, in part due to injuries to key players.

The majority of the club's managers have been English, the only exceptions being John Harris, Ian Porterfield, Billy McEwan and David Weir (all from Scotland), Gary Speed (who was Welsh) and Danny Wilson who has represented Northern Ireland at international football. Wilson is also one of two managers to have been manager of United and fierce Steel City rivals Sheffield Wednesday. Wilson was Wednesday's manager in 1998 and also a player for Wednesday in the early 1990s. He was United's manager in 2011. The other manager is Steve Bruce, who started his managerial career at Sheffield United as a player-manager in 1998. Then became Wednesday's manager in 2019.

Chris Wilder is the current manager having been appointed for a third spell in September 2025.

== Managerial history ==
=== 1889–1932: Early days ===
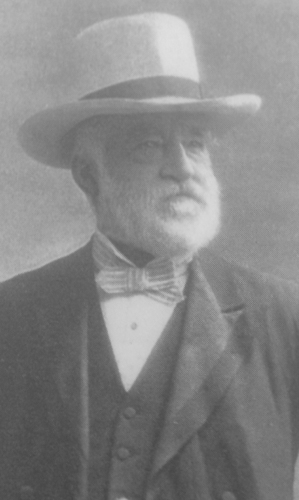
JB Wostinholm, who was the first 'manager' of the Blades

At its formation in 1889 United did not employ what would today be termed a manager, the side was coached by a trainer and a football committee selected the team and decided upon tactics (this was a continuation of the structure of Sheffield United Cricket Club from which the football team had been formed.) They did appoint Joseph Wostinholm to the position of club secretary and he was responsible for the day-to-day running of the club, matchday organisation and dealing with players and contracts. Wostinholm oversaw a period of rapid growth for the team, culminating in 1898 when United won their one and only First Division championship, after which he retired. Wostinholm was replaced by John Nicholson as secretary and he would remain in post for over 30 years until his death in 1932. Nicholson presided over the most successful period in the club's history as United became a leading force in English football, winning the FA Cup four times and regularly challenged at the top of the league but a second Division One title for the club eluded him.

=== 1932–73: A new era ===
Following the death of John Nicholson, who died whilst travelling to an away match in Birmingham, the United board turned to Chesterfield manager Teddy Davison to become the club's first real manager. The team were in decline however and were soon relegated for the first time in their history. Davison gradually rebuilt the side with astute signings and young players and regained top-flight status but the club's post-war financial problems would hamper team building for years to come. Davison retired in 1952 and prompted the club to appoint Rotherham United manager Reg Freeman as his successor. Freeman stabilised the team but fell ill and died in 1955, after which United turned to the inexperienced Joe Mercer but he struggled to cope with a team in decline and departed for Aston Villa in 1958. United then appointed Chester manager John Harris who inherited a talented but under performing side which he transformed into a promotion team, returning to Division One in 1961. Harris built a side based on local players and stabilised them in the top-flight but financial issues soon prompted the sale of key players and United were eventually relegated once more. Harris opted to 'move upstairs' to become 'General Manager', and handed the role of team manager to Arthur Rowley but he was sacked after one season following disappointing results. Harris returned as manager and guided the side to promotion once more but after a good start back in the top-flight Harris' confidence faded and he stepped down in 1973 to 'move upstairs' for the second time.

=== 1973–81: Rapid decline ===
Experienced Blackburn Rovers manager Ken Furphy was the man United turned to replace John Harris. He initially did well but the team was ageing and there was little money to replace players, but after a good finish in his first season a disastrous string of results the following year led to Furphy being sacked in October 1975. Jimmy Sirrel was recruited from Notts County but he proved unpopular with both the players and fans and could not halt the decline, overseeing relegation and then being sacked in September 1977 with United at the bottom of Division Two. The ambitious and colourful Harry Haslam was then handed the reins and although many of his ideas were ahead of their time he built an ageing side based on 'star' players at the end of their career. Now in the Third Division performances deteriorated still further and Haslam stepped down due to illness in January 1981. World Cup winner and then United player Martin Peters was promoted to the position of manager but United were relegated to Division Four at the end of the season and Peters resigned.

=== 1981–95: Moving on up ===
With a new ambitious board in place United recruited Ian Porterfield as manager in June 1981. He had an immediate impact, winning the Division Four championship in his first season and taking the club back into the second tier two years later on a meagre budget. Despite this many fans were unhappy with the style of football and Porterfield was sacked in 1986 following supporter protests. Coach Billy McEwan was promoted to the position of manager but failed to improve the standard of play and with attendances falling and the team in danger of relegation once more he was sacked in January 1988. United now turned to the colourful character of Dave Bassett who had most recently had a short, unsuccessful spell as manager of Watford. It was to prove an astute appointment as although he could not prevent relegation in his first season he built a solid, hard working team on a small budget and won back to back promotions, returning the club to the top-flight and achieving regular mid-table finishes. With the formation of the Premier League United's old financial problems and willingness to sell star players without replacing them meant the side eventually succumbed to relegation and when an immediate return was not forthcoming Basset was sacked in December 1995.

=== 1995–present: Comings and goings ===
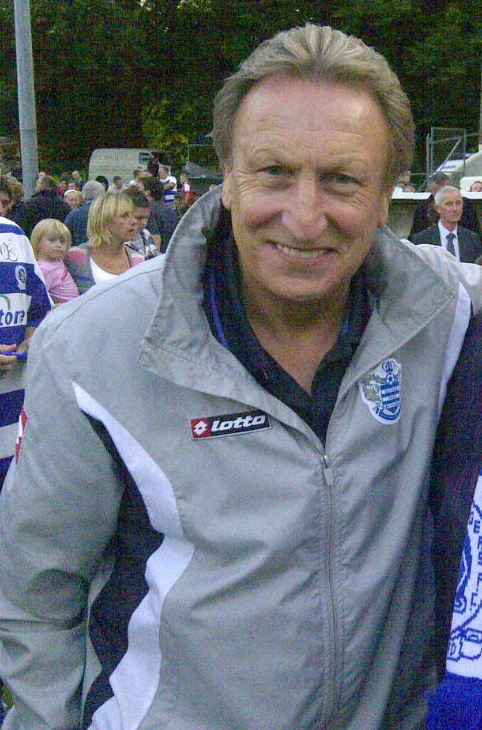
Neil Warnock managed United from 1999 to 2007.

The following years proved a turbulent time for United as they chased the ambition of Premiership football. Experienced Howard Kendall was recruited as manager and undertook a complete rebuilding of the side but left in June 1997 to take over at Everton. Player-coach Nigel Spackman was promoted to replace Kendall but after initial promise he quit after only eight months citing boardroom interference. This was to become a recurring theme and replacement Steve Bruce would leave after only one season citing the same reasons. Adrian Heath then proved a disastrous appointment and lasted only six months before being sacked with United looking more likely to be relegated than promoted. The Blades then turned to experienced lower league manager Neil Warnock who managed to stave off relegation and began to rebuild the side on a meagre budget. Warnock proved a divisive figure with fans but after a number of mid-table finishes he achieved promotion back to the Premiership in 2006 but the side were poor the following season and were relegated, prompting the board not to renew Warnock's contract.

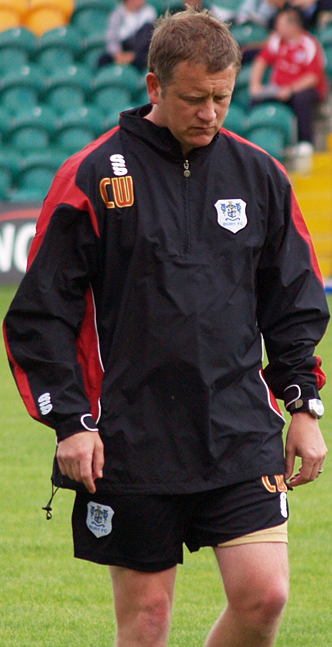
Chris Wilder, United manager from 2016 to 2021.

Just like Adrian Heath, the appointment of Bryan Robson in 2007 proved an unpopular and unsuccessful one and he was sacked after less than a year following poor results and intense fan pressure. Former assistant manager Kevin Blackwell was appointed as Robson's replacement, but despite reaching the play-off finals in his first full season the team was obviously in decline and he was sacked after only two games of the 2010–11 season. Worse was to come however as player-coach Gary Speed was briefly promoted to manager, but left after only a few months to take over the Welsh national side. Micky Adams then became the third full-time manager of the season and oversaw a disastrous run of results which saw United relegated and Adams sacked after only six months in charge. With United in the third tier once more Danny Wilson was appointed as manager in June 2011, despite protests from United fans over his previous association with cross-town rivals Sheffield Wednesday. He guided the club to the League One play-off final in his first full season in charge, losing to Huddersfield Town. Despite the club challenging for promotion the following season, a poor run of results led to Wilson's departure in April 2013, being replaced by Chris Morgan until the end of the season. After a long search for a new boss former Scotland defender David Weir was appointed as Wilson's long-term replacement. His tenure was short-lived however, as he was sacked the following October after winning only one game from thirteen in charge. After Chris Morgan had overseen the team for a brief time, Nigel Clough was appointed as Weir's permanent successor in October 2013.

== List of managers ==
As of match played 9 September 2026

Name	Nat	From	To	P	W	D	L	Win%
Name	Nat	From	To	Record				
J.B. Wostinholm (secretary)	England	22 March 1889	31 May 1899	233	103	54	76	44.21%
John Nicholson (secretary)	England	1 June 1899	23 April 1932	1,216	486	281	449	39.97%
Teddy Davison	England	15 June 1932	30 June 1952	592	248	139	205	41.89%
Reg Freeman	England	1 August 1952	4 August 1955	132	54	30	48	40.91%
Joe Mercer	England	18 August 1955	25 December 1958	156	64	35	57	41.03%
Archie Clark (acting)	England	25 December 1958	13 April 1959	20	13	2	5	65%
John Harris	Scotland	13 April 1959	11 July 1968	424	174	102	148	41.04%
Arthur Rowley	England	11 July 1968	6 August 1969	43	16	11	16	37.21%
John Harris	Scotland	6 August 1969	5 December 1973	188	84	45	59	44.68%
Ken Furphy	England	7 December 1973	6 October 1975	80	27	22	31	33.75%
Cec Coldwell (acting)	England	6 October 1975	16 October 1975	1	1	0	0	100%
Jimmy Sirrel	England	16 October 1975	27 September 1977	81	20	23	38	24.69%
Cec Coldwell (acting)	England	27 September 1977	26 January 1978	20	9	5	6	45%
Harry Haslam	England	26 January 1978	16 January 1981	158	50	40	68	31.65%
Martin Peters	England	18 January 1981	30 May 1981	16	3	6	7	18.75%
Ian Porterfield	Scotland	6 June 1981	27 March 1986	226	98	58	70	43.36%
Billy McEwan	Scotland	27 March 1986	2 January 1988	86	27	25	34	31.4%
Dave Bassett	England	21 January 1988	12 December 1995	393	150	101	142	38.17%
Howard Kendall	England	13 December 1995	27 June 1997	82	34	27	21	41.46%
Nigel Spackman	England	27 June 1997	2 March 1998	43	20	17	6	46.51%
Russell Slade (acting)	England	2 March 1998	9 March 1998	2	0	1	1	0%
Steve Thompson (acting)	England	9 March 1998	2 July 1998	17	5	6	6	29.41%
Steve Bruce	England	2 July 1998	17 May 1999	55	22	15	18	40%
Adrian Heath	England	15 June 1999	23 November 1999	22	7	5	10	31.82%
Russell Slade (acting)	England	23 November 1999	2 December 1999	2	0	1	1	0%
Neil Warnock	England	2 December 1999	16 May 2007	388	165	100	123	42.53%
Bryan Robson	England	22 May 2007	14 February 2008	38	14	12	12	36.84%
Kevin Blackwell	England	14 February 2008	14 August 2010	125	53	36	36	42.4%
Gary Speed	Wales	17 August 2010	14 December 2010	18	6	3	9	33.33%
John Carver (acting)	England	14 December 2010	30 December 2010	3	1	0	2	33.33%
Micky Adams	England	30 December 2010	10 May 2011	24	4	5	15	16.67%
Danny Wilson	Northern Ireland	27 May 2011	10 April 2013	106	55	31	20	51.89%
Chris Morgan (acting)	England	10 April 2013	10 June 2013	7	2	2	3	28.57%
David Weir	Scotland	10 June 2013	11 October 2013	13	1	3	9	7.69%
Chris Morgan (acting)	England	11 October 2013	23 October 2013	3	1	1	1	33.33%
Nigel Clough	England	23 October 2013	25 May 2015	104	49	30	25	47.12%
Nigel Adkins	England	2 June 2015	12 May 2016	54	22	14	18	40.74%
Chris Wilder	England	12 May 2016	13 March 2021	227	106	47	74	46.7%
Paul Heckingbottom (interim)	England	13 March 2021	27 May 2021	11	3	0	8	27.27%
Slaviša Jokanović	Serbia	27 May 2021	25 November 2021	22	8	6	8	36.36%
Paul Heckingbottom	England	25 November 2021	5 December 2023	98	49	18	31	50%
Chris Wilder	England	5 December 2023	18 June 2025	78	34	13	31	43.59%
Rubén Sellés	Spain	18 June 2025	14 September 2025	6	0	0	6	0%
Chris Wilder	England	15 September 2025		50	22	9	19	44%

== Assistant managers ==
Archie Clark was the first person to be officially appointed assistant manager of Sheffield United in 1958. Since then United have appointed a further 24 people to the position, with [Stuart McCall] post-holder. (Note: At various points there have been more than one person with the title of assistant manager employed at a single time.) Of the club's assistant managers, four of them (Martin Peters, Adrian Heath, Nigel Spackman and Kevin Blackwell) were subsequently appointed to the position of manager on a full-time basis, while a further three (Archie Clark, Cec Coldwell twice and Russell Slade twice) took the role on a caretaker basis. Steve Thompson made the reverse transition, having a spell as acting manager in 1997 before being appointed as joint assistant manager to Steve Bruce a year later.

- (England) Archie Clark (1958–67)
- (Scotland) Andy Beattie (1967–68)
- (England) John Short (1969–76)
- (England) Cec Coldwell (1969–78)
- (Uruguay) Danny Bergara (1978–81)
- (England) Martin Peters (1980–81)
- (Scotland) John McSeveney (1981–88)
- (England) Wally Downes (1988–95)
- (England) Geoff Taylor (1991–95)
- (England) Adrian Heath (1995–96)
- (England) Nigel Spackman (1996–97)
- (England) Steve Thompson (1998)
- (England) John Deehan (1998–99)
- (England) Russell Slade (1998–99)
- (England) Kevin Blackwell (1999–2003)
- (Republic of Ireland) David Kelly (2003–04)
- (England) Keith Curle (2004–05)
- (Scotland) Stuart McCall (2005–07)
- (England) Brian Kidd (2007–08)
- (England) Sam Ellis (2008–10)
- (England) Alan Cork (2010–11)
- (England) Frank Barlow (2011–13)
- (England) David Unsworth (2013)
- (Wales) Adam Owen (2013) (Note: Adam Owen's full job title was 'Assistant Manager – Performance'. Lee Carsley's full job title was 'Assistant Manager – Technical)
- (Republic of Ireland) Lee Carsley (2013)
- (England) Gary Crosby (2013–15)
- (England) Andy Crosby (2015–2016)
- (England) Alan Knill (2016–2021)
- (Spain) Chema Sanz (2021)
- (Scotland) Stuart McCall (2021-2023)
- (England) Alan Knill (2023-2025)
- (England) James Oliver-Pearce (2025)
- (England) Alan Knill (2025-2026)
- (Republic of Ireland) Michael Collins (2026-)
