= Shortt =

Shortt is a surname. Notable people with the surname include:

- Adam Shortt (1859–1931), Canadian economic historian.
- Bill Shortt (1920–2004), Welsh professional footballer.
- Edward Shortt (1862–1935), British politician.
- Henry Edward Shortt (1887–1987), British protozoologist.
- John Shortt (1822–1889), British Indian physician, naturalist, and ethnologist
- Kate Shortt, British pianist, cello player, songwriter.
- Pat Shortt (born 1966), Irish comedian and entertainer.
- William Hamilton Shortt (1881–1971), British engineer and horologist.
- Yvonne Shortt (born 1972), American social practice installation artist.

== See also ==
- Shortt-Synchronome clock, a free pendulum clock, patented in 1921.
- Polly Shortts, a hill on the outskirts in South Africa.
- Short (surname), a similar surname.
