= Shortness =

Shortness may refer to:

- Short stature
- Shortness of breath
- Shortness of temper

== See also ==
- Short (disambiguation)
