= James Short =

James, Jim or Jimmy Short may refer to:

== Sportspeople ==
- James Short (footballer) (1896–?), English footballer (Birmingham, Watford, Norwich City)
- Jimmy Short (1909–?), English footballer (Sheffield Wednesday, Brighton & Hove Albion, Barrow)
- James Short (rugby union) (born 1989), English rugby union player
- James Short (figure skater), coach and participant of the 1959 and 1960 United States Figure Skating Championships

== Others ==
- James Short (mathematician) (1710–1768), Scottish mathematician, telescope, and scientific instrument maker
- Jim Short (politician) (born 1936), Australian politician and diplomat
- Jim Short (comedian) (born 1967), American stand-up comedian in San Francisco
- Jimmy Logan (James Allen Short, 1928–2001), Scottish actor
- James F. Short (1902–1986), American businessman, rancher, and politician
- James F. Short Jr. (1924–2018), American sociologist
