= John Short =

John Short may refer to:

- John Rennie Short (born 1951), Scottish geographer and public policy academic
- John Tregerthen Short (1858–1933), Australian railway official
- John Short (Wisconsin politician) (1874–1951), American politician from Wisconsin
- John Short (Kentucky politician) (born 1964), American politician from Kentucky
- John Short (Canadian politician) (1836–1886)
- John Short (Irish politician) for Portarlington (Parliament of Ireland constituency)
- John Short (Scottish politician), 1640s member of the Parliament of Scotland
- John Short (actor) in Regeneration (Star Trek: Enterprise)
- John Short (communications theorist), see Social presence theory
- John Short (footballer) on List of Sheffield United F.C. managers
- John Short (journalist) (1937–2024), Canadian sports journalist
- John Short (missionary) (born 1939), Australian missionary
- James Short (footballer), (born John James Short 1896– c. 1927), English footballer

== See also ==
- Jack Short (disambiguation)
