= BP Biofuels Highlands =

- Company type: Subsidiary
- Industry: Biofuels
- Headquarters: Tampa, Florida, United States
- Products: Cellulosic ethanol
- Parent: BP Biofuels
- Website: www.vercipia.com

BP Biofuels Highlands was a subsidiary of BP developing cellulosic ethanol project in Florida. It was formerly known as Vercipia Biofuels. The company headquartered out of Tampa, Florida.

Vercipia was established as a joint venture between BP and Verenium Corporation in 2009. In July 2010, it became a wholly owned subsidiary of BP.

Highlands planned to develop a fully integrated commercial plant of cellulosic ethanol located in Highlands County, Florida. The expected output of the plant was up to 36 million US gallons (860,000 bbl) of cellulosic ethanol per year. The project was cancelled in October 2012.
