= Eboni =

Eboni is a female given name. Notable people with this name include:

- Eboni Booth, American playwright and actress
- Eboni Boykin, public figure
- Eboni Deon, American meteorologist
- Eboni Foster, member of Nuttin' Nyce
- Eboni Stocks, winner of Australia's Next Top Model (season 2)
- Eboni Usoro-Brown (born 1988), English netball player
- Eboni K. Williams (born 1983), American celebrity

== See also ==
- Ebonee
- Ebony (given name)
