= Shorter =

Shorter may refer to:

== As a place name ==
- Shorter, Alabama, a town located in Macon County, Alabama, United States

== As a surname ==
- Alan Shorter (1932–1988), American jazz trumpeter and flugelhorn player
- Brian Shorter (born 1968), American former basketball player
- Clement Shorter (1857–1926), English journalist
- Clinton Shorter (born 1971), Canadian film and television composer
- Dora Sigerson Shorter (1866–1918), Irish poet and sculptor
- Edward Shorter (1767–1836), British inventor
- Eli Sims Shorter (1823–1879), American politician
- Frank Shorter (born 1947), American athlete
- Jim Shorter (1938–2000), American football player
- John Gill Shorter (1818–1872), American politician
- Justin Shorter (born 2000), American football player
- Ken Shorter (1945/46–2024), Australian actor
- Laurence Shorter (born 1970), American author and comedian
- Richard Shorter (1906–1984), English cricketer
- Rick Shorter (1934–2017), American musician and record producer
- Shannon Shorter (born 1989), American basketball player
- Stuart Shorter, disabled homeless man from Cambridge, England, about whom the biography "Stuart: A Life Backwards" was written
- Susie Lankford Shorter (1859–1912), American educator
- Wayne Shorter (1933–2023), American jazz saxophonist and composer

== Other uses ==
- The comparative form of short
- Shorter University, an American four year, co-educational college located in Rome, Georgia, United States
- Shorter Oxford English Dictionary, a two-volume, scaled-down version of the Oxford English Dictionary
- Westminster Shorter Catechism or "Shorter Catechism", a set of three Christian religious texts dating from the 1640s
