= Jay Short =

American CEO

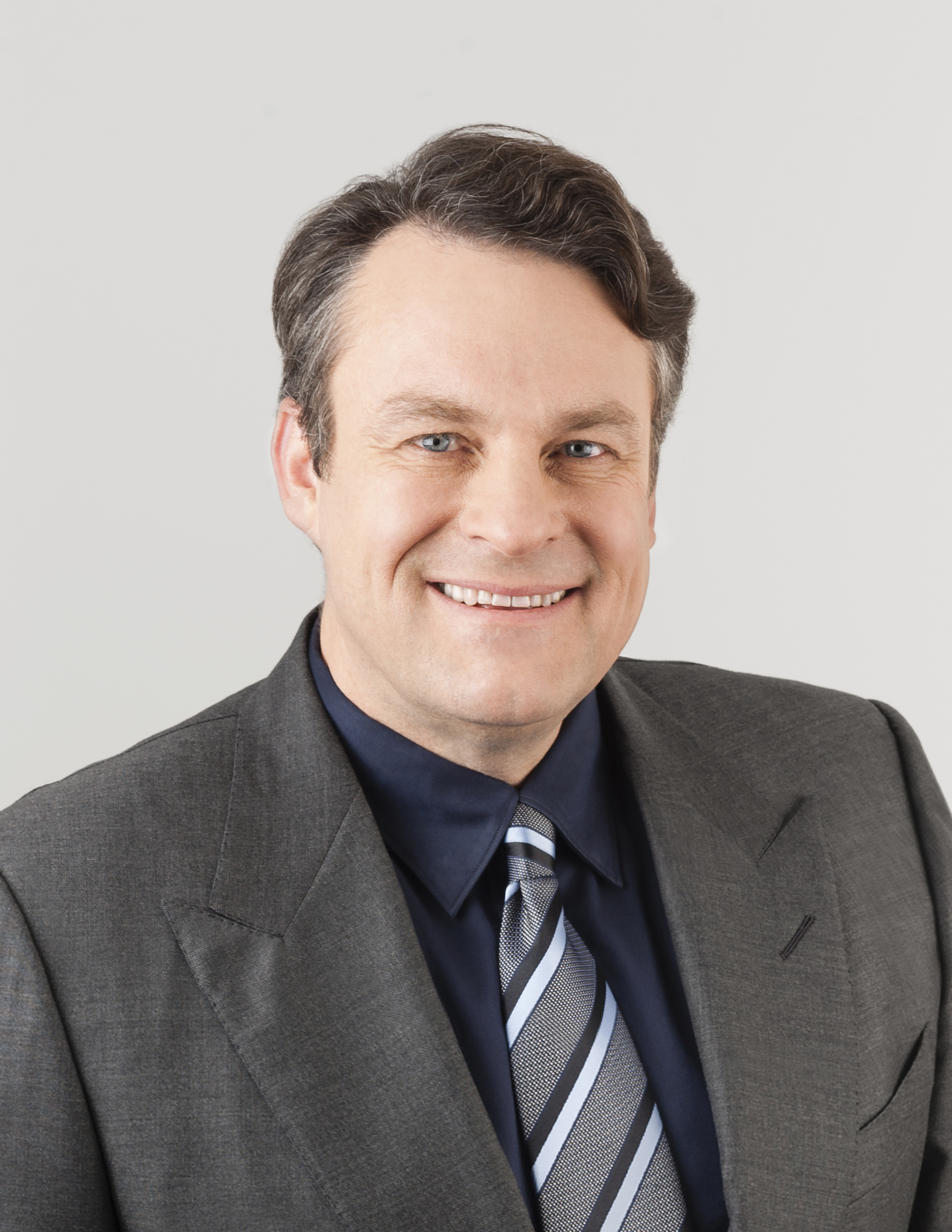
Jay Short

Jay M. Short is founder and CEO of the antibody drug company BioAtla, LLC. He was vice president of research and operations at Stratagene (now Agilent Technologies), president of the Stratagene antibody subsidiary Stratacyte, then founder and CEO of Diversa until 2005. While at Diversa, Short invented methods of protein and pathway discovery via metagenomics, in addition to evolution technologies gene site saturation mutagenesis (GSSM) and GeneReassembly, and was the first to combine these discovery and evolution technologies.

On December 7, 2015, San Diego–based BioAtla signed a license and option deal with Pfizer, involving BioAtla's conditionally-active biologics (CAB) antibody platform and Pfizer's antibody-drug conjugate (ADC) payloads. BioAtla is eligible to receive more than $1.0 billion in up-front, regulatory and sales milestone commitments as well as tiered marginal royalties reaching double digits on potential future product sales.

Short is also founder of the E. O. Wilson Biodiversity Foundation, chairman of the board of Ciris Energy, and member of the board of directors of Senomyx. Short received his Ph.D. in biochemistry from Case Western Reserve University in Cleveland, Ohio, and his B.A. with honors in chemistry from Taylor University in Upland, Indiana.
