= Kevin Short =

Kevin Short may refer to:

- Kevin A. Short (born 1960), American painter
- Kevin M. Short (born 1963), American mathematician and entrepreneur
- Kevin Short (American football) (born 1992), American football cornerback
- Kevin Short (bass-baritone), American opera singer
- Kevin Short (RNZAF officer)
