= Iben =

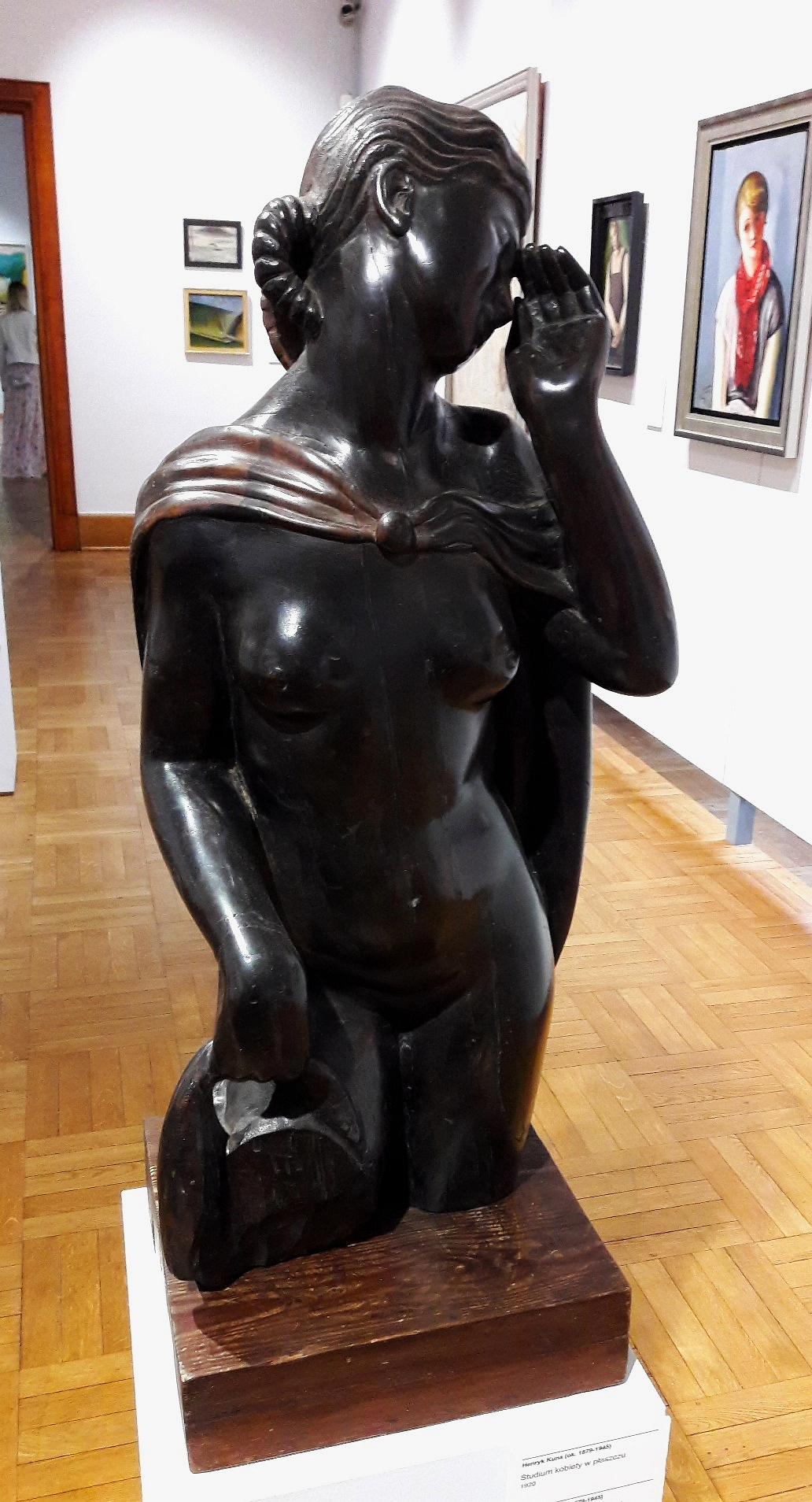
- Study of a Woman in a Coat, a 1920 sculpture in ebony wood by Henryk Kuna. The name Iben, which means ebony in Danish, has been a well-used name for women and girls in Denmark and Norway.
- Gender: Unisex
- Language: Danish

Origin
- Meaning: Danish word for ebony; Frisian form of Ivo or Danish diminutive of Jacob

Iben is a given name of multiple origins, in use primarily in Denmark and Norway. As a feminine name, it might be derived from ibenholt, the Danish word for ebony. It might also be used as a feminine version of Ib, a Danish diminutive of Jacob. It was among the ten most used names for newborn girls in Norway in 2022.

As a masculine name, it is a Frisian version of the name Ivo or used in Norway as a personal name that is possibly derived from the German surname Ibenhard.

== Women ==
- Iben Akerlie (born 1988), Norwegian actress
- Iben Bergstein (born 1995), Danish badminton player
- Iben Dorner (born 1978), Danish actress and voice artist
- Iben Hjejle (born 1971), Danish actress
- Iben Larsen, Danish former curler
- Iben Mondrup (born 1969), Danish novelist
- Iben Sandemose (born 1950), Norwegian illustrator, children's writer, playwright and biographer
- Iben Tinning (born 1974), Danish professional golfer

== Men ==
- Iben Browning (1918–1991), American business consultant, author and self-proclaimed climatologist

== See also ==
- Ebony (given name)
- Icko Iben (1931–2025), American astronomer
