= Bert Millard =

English footballer

Personal information
- Date of birth: 1 October 1898
- Place of birth: West Bromwich, England
- Height: 6 ft 0 in (1.83 m)
- Positions: Forward; centre half

Youth career
- –: Swan Village

Senior career*
Years	Team	Apps	(Gls)
–	Coseley		
–	Barry Town		
–	Cardiff City		
1919–1920	Birmingham	32	(14)
1920–1922	Coventry City	63	(8)
1922–1924	Crystal Palace	35	(4)
1924–1925	Charlton Athletic	38	(5)
1925–1926	Leamington Town		
- * Club domestic league appearances and goals

Albert Alexander R. Millard (1 October 1898 – after 1925) was an English professional footballer who played in the Football League for Birmingham, Coventry City, Crystal Palace and Charlton Athletic. He could play as a forward or at centre half with equal facility. He was Birmingham's top scorer in the 1919–20 season with 15 goals in all competitions, despite only playing half the season in attack.

Millard was born in West Bromwich, Staffordshire.
