= William Short =

William Short or William Shortt may refer to:

- William Short (Alberta politician) (1866–1926), Mayor of Edmonton, Alberta
- William Short (American ambassador) (1759–1849), United States Minister Plenipotentiary to France, 1790–1792
- William Short (footballer), English footballer
- William Short (priest) (c. 1760 – 1826), Archdeacon of Cornwall
- William Henry Short (1884–1916), English recipient of the Victoria Cross
- William J. Short (1864–1939), member of the Legislative Assembly of Manitoba
- Bill Short (1937–2022), American baseball pitcher
- Bill Shortt (1920–2004), Welsh footballer
- William Allaire Shortt (1859–1915), American politician
- William Hamilton Shortt (1881–1971), English railway engineer and horologist

== See also ==
- William A. Short House, Helena, Arkansas
