= Cec Coldwell =

English footballer and manager

Personal information
- Full name: George Cecil Coldwell
- Date of birth: 12 January 1929
- Place of birth: Dungworth, Sheffield, England
- Date of death: 9 November 2008 (aged 79)
- Position: Full-back

Senior career*
Years	Team	Apps	(Gls)
- Norton Woodseats
1951–1968	Sheffield United	410	(2)

Managerial career
- 1975: Sheffield United (caretaker)
- 1977–1978: Sheffield United (caretaker)
- * Club domestic league appearances and goals

George Cecil Coldwell (12 January 1929 – 9 November 2008) was a professional footballer who played for Sheffield United from 1951 to 1968. He played in the position of right-back.

== Playing career ==
Coldwell signed for Sheffield United in September 1951 from local side Norton Woodseats for a fee of £100, before finally making his debut against Southampton in April 1952. Although a late developer, Coldwell formed a splendid full-back partnership with first Cliff Mason and then Graham Shaw, playing in 410 league games for the Blades which included two rare goals. The captain of the 1961 promotion team, he was retained as a player until 1968, although by then he was fully employed as a junior coach. He became first-team coach at Bramall Lane in 1969, a position he retained until 1983, helping the Blades to promotion in 1971 along with manager John Harris. He also had two stints as acting manager in 1975 and 1977–78.

== Later career ==
Later he ran a newsagent's in Sheffield and Cheadle Hulme, before retiring to Poynton near Stockport.
