= 1900 Colgate football team =

American college football season

1900 Colgate football
- Conference: Independent
- Record: 2–8
- Head coach: Joseph A. Short (1st season)
- Captain: Sherman Jones

1900 Eastern college football independents records
	Conf.			Overall
Team	W	L	T	W		L		T
Yale		–		12	–	0	–	0
Penn		–		12	–	1	–	0
Harvard		–		10	–	1	–	0
Cornell		–		10	–	2	–	0
Geneva		–		5	–	1	–	1
Lafayette		–		9	–	2	–	0
Syracuse		–		7	–	2	–	1
Princeton		–		8	–	3	–	0
Drexel		–		5	–	2	–	0
Fordham		–		3	–	1	–	1
Army		–		7	–	3	–	1
Brown		–		7	–	3	–	1
Columbia		–		7	–	3	–	1
Villanova		–		5	–	2	–	2
Washington & Jefferson		–		6	–	3	–	1
Swarthmore		–		6	–	3	–	2
Holy Cross		–		5	–	3	–	1
Carlisle		–		6	–	4	–	1
Buffalo		–		3	–	2	–	2
Western Univ. of Penn		–		5	–	4	–	0
Bucknell		–		4	–	4	–	1
Dickinson		–		5	–	5	–	0
Pittsburgh College		–		3	–	3	–	1
Rutgers		–		4	–	4	–	0
Vermont		–		4	–	4	–	1
Lehigh		–		5	–	6	–	0
Franklin & Marshall		–		4	–	5	–	0
Temple		–		3	–	4	–	1
Penn State		–		4	–	6	–	1
Amherst		–		4	–	7	–	1
Dartmouth		–		2	–	4	–	2
NYU		–		3	–	6	–	1
Tufts		–		3	–	6	–	1
Wesleyan		–		3	–	6	–	1
New Hampshire		–		1	–	5	–	1
Colgate		–		2	–	8	–	0
CCNY		–		0	–	1	–	0

The 1900 Colgate football team represented Colgate University in the 1900 college football season. Colgate reports the record for the season as 3–7, however, a reporting error in early record keeping mistakenly tracked a loss to Colgate Academy as a win.

== Schedule ==
Date	Opponent	Site	Result
September 22	Colgate Academy	Hamilton, NY	W 6–0
September 24	at Union (NY)	Schenectady, NY	L 0–12
September 26	at Cornell	Ithaca, NY (rivalry)	L 0–16
October 6	Cortland	Hamilton, NY	L 6–11
October 12	Colgate Academy	Hamilton, NY	L 0–6
October 13	Hobart	Hamilton, NY	W 18–0
October 20	at RPI	Troy, NY	L 0–11
October 27	vs. Hamilton	Clinton, NY	L 0–11
November 3	at Rochester	Rochester, NY	L 5–11
November 10	Union (NY)	Hamilton, NY	L 0–10
