= Michael Short =

Mike Short or Michael Short may refer to:

- Michael Short (linguist) (born 1945), British linguist
- Michael Short (engineer) (born 1975), British engineer
- Mike Short (born 1953), British engineer
