= Jack Watson (footballer, born 1892) =

English footballer

Personal information
- Date of birth: September 1892
- Place of birth: Bulwell, England
- Date of death: 1957 (aged 64–65)
- Place of death: Nottingham, England
- Position: Right back

Senior career*
Years	Team	Apps	(Gls)
- Bulwell
	Manchester City	0	(0)
	Oldham Athletic	0	(0)
1918–1919	Bloxwich Strollers		
1919–1920	Birmingham	2	(0)
1920–19??	Measham Town		
- * Club domestic league appearances and goals

John S. Watson (September 1892 – 1957) was an English professional footballer who played in the Football League for Birmingham.

Watson was born in Bulwell, Nottinghamshire. Before the First World War, he was on the books of Manchester City and Oldham Athletic without appearing in the League for either club. After the war, he played non-league football for Bloxwich Strollers before joining Birmingham in July 1919. A right back, Watson made his debut in the Second Division on 11 October 1919, deputising for Billy Ball in a home game against Blackpool which resulted in a 4–2 win. He started the next game, then lost the role of second-choice right back to Tom White, and was soon released to return to non-league with Measham Town.

Watson died in Nottingham in 1957.
