= Shorts (disambiguation) =

Shorts are a garment worn over the pelvic area and upper part of the legs.

Shorts may also refer to:

== Film ==
- Shorts (2009 film), a 2009 American film directed by Robert Rodriguez
- Shorts (2013 film), a 2013 Bollywood film composed of five short films

== Other uses ==
- YouTube Shorts, a short-form video-sharing platform offered by YouTube
- Shorts (aerospace) or Short Brothers, a British aerospace company
- The Shorts, a pop group from the Netherlands
- The Shorts (ATC), an Australian Turf Club Thoroughbred horse race
- Shorts Brothers F.C., a football club in Northern Ireland, United Kingdom
- Shorts Missile Systems or Thales Air Defence, a defence contractor

== See also ==
- "Short Shorts", a 1958 pop hit by The Royal Teens
- Short (disambiguation)
