= Jack Short =

Jack Short may refer to:

- Jack Short (betrayer of William Wallace)
- Jack Short (cricketer) (born 1951), Irish cricketer
- Jack Short (footballer), English footballer
- Jack Short, co-founder of Factory Green, an eco-friendly clothing and accessories company

== See also ==
- John Short (disambiguation)
