= Ebonee =

Ebonee or Ebonée is a female given name. Notable people with this name include:

- Ebonee Davis (born 1992), American model and activist
- Ebonée Noel (born 1990), American actress

== See also ==
- Eboni
- Ebony (given name)
