= Reg Freeman =

English footballer and manager

Personal information
- Full name: Reginald Fidelas Vincent Freeman
- Date of birth: 20 December 1893
- Place of birth: Birkenhead, England
- Date of death: 4 August 1955 (aged 61)
- Place of death: Wickersley, England
- Position: Full back

Senior career*
Years	Team	Apps	(Gls)
1919–1920	Northern Nomads		
1920–1921	Liverpool	0	(0)
1921–1923	Oldham Athletic	101	(0)
1923–1930	Middlesbrough	179	(0)
1930–1934	Rotherham United	95	(3)
Total		375	(3)

Managerial career
- 1934–1952: Rotherham United
- 1952–1955: Sheffield United
- * Club domestic league appearances and goals

Reginald Fidelas Vincent Freeman (20 December 1893 – 4 August 1955) was an English football player and manager.

== Career ==
=== Player ===
Freeman played 104 times for Oldham Athletic, making his debut in January 1921 against Bolton Wanderers. Freeman joined Middlesbrough from the Latics in May 1923 for £3,600. Whilst playing left-back for Middlesbrough, the team won the Second Division title in 1926–27 in impressive fashion, scoring 122 goals in 42 league games. He made 29 league appearances that season. Freeman missed the majority of the following season through injury as Middlesbrough were relegated from the First Division, but he would win another Second Division title in 1928–29 with the club. In total Freeman spent seven seasons playing at Ayresome Park before leaving for Rotherham United for £150 in 1930, where he became player-manager in 1934. He played war-time football for Liverpool as well.

=== Manager ===
Freeman was manager for Rotherham United from 1934 to 1952. Rotherham finished as runners-up three time in succession between 1947 and 1949 and then were champions of the Third Division North in 1950–51. He was appointed as manager of Sheffield United for the 1952–53 season, and immediately led the club to the Second Division title. United narrowly avoid relegation in 1953–54, finishing 20th in the First Division. Other season highlights include the debut of goalkeeper Alan Hodgkinson, plus the first floodlit game at Bramall Lane since the 19th century. Two big defeats early in the 1954–55 season caused concern, but United completed the league double over Steel City derby rivals Wednesday on their way to a 13th-place finish. However Freeman was taken ill and died before the start of the 1955–56 season.

== Career statistics ==
Appearances and goals by club, season and competition
Club	Season	League			FA Cup		Total	
Club	Season	Division	Apps	Goals	Apps	Goals	Apps	Goals
Liverpool	1920–21	First Division	0	0	0	0	0	0
Oldham Athletic	1920–21	First Division	20	0	0	0	20	0
Oldham Athletic	1921–22	First Division	42	0	2	0	44	0
Oldham Athletic	1922–23	First Division	39	0	1	0	40	0
Oldham Athletic	Total		101	0	3	0	104	0
Middlesbrough	1923–24	First Division	40	0	1	0	41	0
Middlesbrough	1924–25	Second Division	33	0	1	0	34	0
Middlesbrough	1925–26	Second Division	39	0	2	0	41	0
Middlesbrough	1926–27	Second Division	29	0	2	0	31	0
Middlesbrough	1927–28	First Division	4	0	0	0	4	0
Middlesbrough	1928–29	Second Division	28	0	2	0	30	0
Middlesbrough	1929–30	First Division	6	0	0	0	6	0
Middlesbrough	Total		179	0	8	0	187	0
Rotherham United	1930–31	Division Three North	29	0	1	0	30	0
Rotherham United	1931–32	Division Three North	24	2	0	0	24	2
Rotherham United	1932–33	Division Three North	33	0	1	0	34	0
Rotherham United	1933–34	Division Three North	9	1	1	0	10	1
Rotherham United	Total		95	3	3	0	98	3
Career total			375	3	14	0	389	3

== Honours ==
=== Player ===
Middlesbrough

- Football League Second Division champions: 1926–27, 1928–29

=== Manager ===
Rotherham United

- Football League Third Division North champions: 1950–51

Sheffield United

- Football League Second Division champions: 1952–53
