= David Short =

David Short may refer to:

- David Short (cricketer) (born 1934), former English cricketer
- David Short (cyclist), Australian Paralympic tandem cycling pilot
- David Short (priest), Australian-Canadian Anglican priest
