= Richard Short =

Richard Short may refer to:

- Richard Short (military artist), best known for sketches he made of Quebec City, shortly after its capture by British forces
- Richard Short (artist) (1841–1919), Cornish artist
- Richard Short (actor) (born 1975), English actor
- Rick Short (born 1972), baseball player
