= Jack Short (footballer) =

English footballer

Personal information
- Full name: John Short
- Date of birth: 18 February 1928
- Place of birth: Great Houghton, Barnsley, England
- Date of death: 10 October 1976 (aged 48)
- Place of death: Barnsley, England
- Position: Defender

Senior career*
Years	Team	Apps	(Gls)
1948–1954	Wolverhampton Wanderers	98	(0)
1954–1956	Stoke City	55	(2)
1956–1960	Barnsley	109	(0)
Total		262	(2)
- * Club domestic league appearances and goals

John "Jack" Short (18 February 1928 – 10 October 1976) was an English footballer who played in the Football League for Barnsley, Stoke City and Wolverhampton Wanderers.

== Career ==
Short was born in Darfield, near Barnsley. He attended Great Houghton Council School and later Darfield Foulstone Modern School, leaving in the spring of 1942. During the week he worked as a haulage hand at Dearne Valley Colliery for the next six years and on Saturday afternoons played centre-forward with Houghton Sports, a team then competing in the Barnsley Nelson League. Short joined Wolverhampton Wanderers from non-league Wath Wanderers in the spring of 1948. He became captain of the Wolves "A" team and made his league debut for Wolves on 2 December 1950 against West Bromwich Albion and played a key role as Stan Cullis' side reached the FA Cup semi final in 1950–51 losing in a replay to Newcastle United. Short spent the next three seasons at Molineux making the right back position his own after Stan Cullis moved him from being an attacker. That said, Short played as a makeshift centre forward in January 1952 where he scored twice against Manchester City in the FA Cup. However injury saw him miss the remainder of the 1952–53 campaign and he played 27 times in 1953–54 as Wolves won the First Division title.

He left for Staffordshire rivals Stoke City on 9 June 1954 with Stoke aiming for a return to the top-flight. He played 31 times in 1954–55 as the "Potters" finished in 5th position with Short again being used as a backup forward scoring twice against Swansea Town on 13 November 1954. He played 33 times in 1955–56 as Stoke ended in a poor position of 13th and Short was given a free transfer to his hometown club Barnsley on 25 October 1956. He was a regular for the "Tykes" for three seasons, making his debut at Oakwell against Liverpool on 27 October 1956 in a 4–1 home win. He retired from professional football through injury at the end of the 1959–60 season.

After retirement Short went back to the mining industry, working as a coal miner, and later on the pit top, becoming a foreman. He also worked as a scout for Wolves and was manager of Houghton Main WMC.

On Sunday 10 October 1976 after a playing in a charity football match in Wombwell between an ex Barnsley team and Charlie Williams XI, Short collapsed and blacked out. An ambulance was called and by the time it had arrived he had partly recovered and refused to go to hospital. But not long after, he collapsed again and it was recalled. Short was pronounced dead on arrival at Barnsley Hospital.

== Career statistics ==
Appearances and goals by club, season and competition
Club	Season	League			FA Cup		Total	
Club	Season	Division	Apps	Goals	Apps	Goals	Apps	Goals
Wolverhampton Wanderers	1950–51	First Division	18	0	7	0	25	0
Wolverhampton Wanderers	1951–52	First Division	25	0	1	2	26	2
Wolverhampton Wanderers	1952–53	First Division	29	0	0	0	29	0
Wolverhampton Wanderers	1953–54	First Division	26	0	1	0	27	0
Wolverhampton Wanderers	Total		98	0	9	2	107	2
Stoke City	1954–55	Second Division	25	2	6	0	31	2
Stoke City	1955–56	Second Division	30	0	3	0	33	0
Stoke City	Total		55	2	9	0	64	2
Barnsley	1956–57	Second Division	27	0	4	0	31	0
Barnsley	1957–58	Second Division	38	0	2	0	40	0
Barnsley	1958–59	Second Division	39	0	1	0	40	0
Barnsley	1959–60	Third Division	5	0	0	0	5	0
Barnsley	Total		109	0	7	0	116	0
Career total			262	2	25	2	287	4

== Honours ==
Wolverhampton Wanderers

- Football League First Division champions: 1953–54
