= George Short =

George Short may refer to one of two athletes

- George Short (footballer) (1866–after 1895), English footballer
- George Short (athlete) (born 1941), Canadian Olympic sprinter
- George F. Short (fl. 1920s), third Attorney General of Oklahoma
- George Washington Short (fl. 1840s), businessman and namesake owner of the George Short House
