= Ebony Satala =

Fiji international rugby union player

- Born: 15 June 1989 (age 37)
- Height: 1.77 m (5 ft 10 in)
- Weight: 83 kg (183 lb)

Rugby union career
- Position: Forward
International career
Years	Team	Apps	(Points)
2022	Fiji	1	(0)
National sevens team
Years	Team		Comps
2016–	Fiji		

Ebony Satala (born 15 June 1989) is a Fijian rugby union player.

== Biography ==
Satala began playing rugby in Australia at the age of 22. Her father hails from the chiefly village of Namoli in Lautoka and is a cousin of former Flying Fijian Viliame Satala. She made her Fijiana sevens debut at the France Sevens in the final leg of the 2016–17 Sevens Series.

Satala made her international debut for the Fijiana XV's against Australia on 6 May 2022 at Suncorp Stadium.
