= Robert Short =

Robert Short may refer to:

- Bob Short (1917–1982), American sports team owner and politician
- Bobby Short (1924–2005), American cabaret singer and pianist
- Rob Short (born 1972), Canadian field hockey player
- Robert Short (East India Company officer) (1783–1859), British officer in the Honourable East India Company
- Robert L. Short (1932–2009), American clergyman and writer
- Robert McCawley Short (1904–1932), American aviator
- Robert Quirk Short (1759–1827), Church of England clergyman
- Robert V. Short (1823–1908), American politician in Oregon
- Robert Short (make-up artist), makeup and visual effects artist
- Robert Short (politician), American politician
- Bob Short (cricketer) (born 1948), British cricket player
