= General Short (disambiguation) =

Walter Short (1880–1949) was a U.S. Army major general and temporary lieutenant general. General Short may also refer to:

- Alonzo Short (born 1939), U.S. Army lieutenant general
- Jennifer Short (fl. 1990s–2020s), U.S. Air Force brigadier general
- Walter Cowen Short (1870–1952), U.S. Army brigadier general

== See also ==
- Arthur Shortt (1899–1984), British Army major general
