= Don Short =

Don Short may refer to:

- Don L. Short (1903–1982), American politician
- Don Short (journalist) (1932–2023), British journalist
