= Arthur Short =

Arthur Short may refer to:

- Arthur Short (cricketer) (born 1947), South African cricketer
- Arthur Short (politician) (1850–1933), politician in the British colony of South Australia
- Arthur Ernest William Short (1890–1949), South Australian businessman and city councillor
- Arthur Rendle Short (1880–1953), professor of surgery at Bristol University

== See also ==
- Arthur Shortt (1899–1984), British Army officer
