= Harry Russell (footballer) =

English footballer

Personal information
- Height: 5 ft 7 in (1.70 m)
- Position: Full back

Senior career*
Years	Team	Apps	(Gls)
1913–1923	Fulham	138	(7)
- * Club domestic league appearances and goals

Harry Russell was an English footballer who played as a full back for Fulham. He played 138 appearances in the league and contributed 7 goals in a Fulham shirt. He was an ever-present member of the Fulham squad who reached the final of the Victory Cup in 1919, where they lost 3–0 to Chelsea.

Russell was part of the group of active and former Fulham players who fought for their country in the First World War.
