= Kevin M. Short =

American mathematician and entrepreneur (born 1963)

Kevin M. Short (born June 23, 1963) is an American mathematician and entrepreneur. He is a professor of Applied Mathematics at the University of New Hampshire. He is also co-founder and Chief Technology Officer (CTO) at Setem Technologies, in Newbury, Massachusetts. Since 1994, when he began at UNH, Short's academic research and work has continually focused on tying together nonlinear chaos theory and signal processing so that nonlinearity can play a major role in the future of technology development.

== Education ==
Short grew up and attended high school in Suffern, New York. He completed his undergraduate work at the University of Rochester in 1985, receiving both a B.S. in Physics and a B.A. in geology. He then attended the Imperial College of London on a Marshall Scholarship, where he earned his PhD in Theoretical Physics. In 1994, Short joined the University of New Hampshire's Department of Mathematics as an assistant professor. At UNH, Short presently holds the position of University Professor.

== Research ==
In 1996, Short developed and patented a technology called CCT, or Chaotic Compression Technology. Claimed to be "fundamentally different" from existing technology, CCT used nonlinear mathematical equations to produce complex waveforms. These waveforms were then transmitted through the Internet or any communications device, requiring far less bandwidth to transmit the same amount of data than the existing technology. CCT was widely used whenever music or ringtones were downloaded to a cell phone device.

== Business ventures ==
=== Chaoticom ===
In 2001, Short founded Chaoticom (later renamed Grove Mobile), where he served as the Director and Chief Technology Officer. Chaoticom was the first ever University spin-off company at UNH, and it sought to commercialize Short's research at the university and his patented Chaotic Compression Technology (CCT). Chaoticom applied CCT towards a direct to cell phone mobile music download service, and many innovations within the company led to patenting. The company was acquired by LiveWire Mobile Inc. in March 2008.

=== Setem Technologies ===
In 2012, Short co-founded Setem Technologies, where he continues to serve as Chief Technical Officer. Another UNH spinoff company, Setem seeks to use Short's mathematical theorems and signal separation technology to enhance the voice clarity and audio signals in today's voice and speech recognition products (i.e.-cell phones, headsets, hearing aids, voice-activated electronics).

== Grammy Award ==
Short was instrumental in using his Chaotic Compression Technology to restore a bootleg wire recording of a Woody Guthrie concert that is the only known recording of the folk singer performing before a live audience. His work with the project helped earn him and a small team of producers and engineers the 2008 Grammy Award for Best Historical Album: The Live Wire - Woody Guthrie In Performance 1949. Singer-songwriter Nora Guthrie and Jorge Arévalo Mateus were the compilation producers, while Jamie Howarth, Steve Rosenthal, Warren Russell-Smith and Dr. Kevin Short were mastering engineers.

== Awards and honors ==
- National Academy of Inventors Fellow (2015)
- Innovator of the Year (2012)
- Entrepreneurial Venture Creation Person of the Year (2008)
- Grammy Award (2008)

== Selected publications ==
- K. M. Short; K. Zarringhalam (2008), "An adaptive multiresolution image analysis using compact cupolets", Nonlinear Dynamics, 1–2 (52): 51–70
- K. M. Short; R. A. Garcia (May 2006), Signal analysis using complex spectral phase evolution method, Audio Engineering Society 120th Convention
- K. M. Short (1997), "Detection of teleseismic events in seismic sensor data using nonlinear dynamic forecasting", International Journal of Bifurcation and Chaos, 7 (8): 1833–1845, Bibcode:1997IJBC....7.1833S, doi:10.1142/S0218127497001400
