= Edward Short =

Edward Short may refer to:

- Edward Short, Baron Glenamara (1912–2012), British politician
- Edward Short (judge) (1806–1871), Canadian judge
- Edward Shortt (1862–1935), British lawyer and politician

== See also ==
- Edward Shortt (1862–1935), British politician
