= Jimmy Short =

English footballer

Personal information
- Full name: James William Short
- Date of birth: 1909
- Place of birth: Bedlington, England
- Height: 5 ft 9 in (1.75 m)
- Position: Forward

Senior career*
Years	Team	Apps	(Gls)
19??–1931	Jarrow		
1931–1933	Sheffield Wednesday	2	(0)
1933–1935	Brighton & Hove Albion	37	(11)
1935–1936	Barrow	9	(4)
- South Shields
- Walker Celtic
- Middle Dock
- * Club domestic league appearances and goals

James William Short (1909 – after 1935) was an English professional footballer who played as a forward in the Football League for Sheffield Wednesday, Brighton & Hove Albion and Barrow. He also played non-league football for clubs including Jarrow, South Shields, Walker Celtic and Middle Dock.
