= Laurence Shorter =

Laurence Shorter (born 1970) is an author and comedian who lives in London.

He is the author of The Optimist: One Man’s Search For The Brighter Side Of Life, which was published in January 2009 by Canongate Books, and author and photographer of A Hedonist's Guide to Tallinn, published by Hg2.

Born in New York, he studied History at Cambridge University. Following an early career in business which included management consultancy, new media business development and venture capital, Shorter gained an MBA at the business school INSEAD. He went on to co-found a Business-to-business web startup in Paris. He has been writing and performing since 2001, when he was selected for the Old Vic Theatre’s noted "New Voices" programme. He and his work have appeared on the BBC, in The Observer and The Independent, and at the Edinburgh Festival and assorted London theatres.
