= O'Day Short =

African American refrigerator engineer

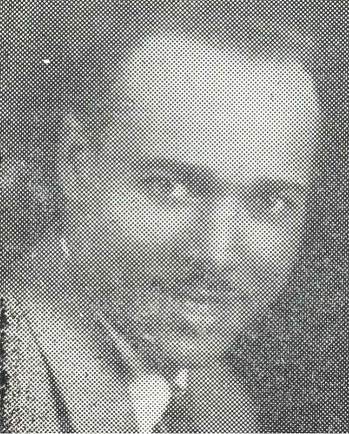
Portrait of O’Day H. Short

O'Day H. Short (February 7, 1905 – January 22, 1946) was an American refrigerator engineer who broke the color barrier in Fontana, California after buying land and constructing a house south of Base Line Road. Short contacted the FBI and the black press after receiving a warning of imminent violence from vigilantes. On December 16, 1945, the house exploded in a fireball. His wife Helen, and young children Barry and Carol Ann died due to their burns by the following day. O'Day would survive for a month before succumbing to his injuries.

== Base Line Road ==
During the Dust Bowl, 5,000 Southern white families headed west and found jobs in Fontana, home of Kaiser Steel, but they did not leave behind their preferences for segregation. African-Americans were permitted to live north of Base Line Road but were not allowed to live south of it. Possibly because he and his family were light-skinned, however, Short was able to buy a five-acre lot on Randall Avenue and Pepper Street.

While the home was still being completed, Short and his family moved there in the fall of 1945.

== Threats ==
As word got out that the family was black, neighbors became concerned, and asked a sheriff's deputy to advise Short that he was "out of bounds". The local white Chamber of Commerce offered to buy the property back for full value. The seller, once apprised of his mistake, warned Short that the local "vigilante committee" might have to resort to violence.

In response, Short contacted the FBI and local black newspapers.

== Explosion ==
On December 16, 1945, the house exploded while the Shorts were inside. The family was taken by a friendly neighbor to Kaiser Permanente Hospital. Although he lingered for a month, Short died soon after being informed by the District Attorney that none of his family had survived.

Authorities claimed that the explosion was due to a faulty oil lamp. However, the coroner's jury was skeptical of this conclusion and ruled that the fire was of unknown origin, although they were not informed of the threats, as the coroner considered the reports to be hearsay. An arson investigator hired by the NAACP, Paul T. Wolfe, found the lamp to be mostly intact, and concluded that the fire was deliberately set from outside the house.

== Aftermath ==
Black newspapers decried the deaths as an injustice. The ACLU and NAACP organized rallies in Los Angeles and San Bernardino which drew upwards of 6,000 people calling for a full investigation.

The land on which the home stood is now the site of Randall Pepper Elementary School. Grassroots efforts from the community are calling and petitioning for the renaming of the Elementary school or some memorialization of O’Day and the Short family. The official renaming of Randall-Pepper Elementary to become O’Day Short Elementary will be in effect beginning the 2025/2026 School Year.

It would be another 20 years until a black family would again live in downtown Fontana.

== See also ==
- Residential segregation
