= Patrick Short =

Patrick Short may refer to:

- Patrick Short (fl. c. 1830), British-born religious leader
- Patrick Short (1859–1941), Queensland police commissioner

== See also ==
- Pat Shortt (1967–), Irish entertainer
