= Eboni Boykin =

American film director

Eboni Boykin gained attention for attending Columbia University despite a severely disadvantaged high school experience.

Her story of earning a full scholarship to an Ivy League university, after spending some of her high school years homeless, circulated as an inspirational narrative. She was used as an example in a criminology textbook to illustrate the social control theory of crime (with Boykin's success proving that "a strong bond to society" can prevent juvenile delinquency). The wide press coverage of Boykin's story was held as exemplary of the way news stories describe primarily white institutions, but not historically black colleges and universities, as the real "liberators of Black students who are low-income and first-generation, despite HBCUs catering to these types of students for decades."

Boykin graduated from Columbia in May 2016. In 2016, Boykin wrote and directed a short horror film called "Afterbirth."
