= William Mumford (footballer) =

English footballer

Personal information
- Full name: William Richard Mumford
- Date of birth: 3 March 1894
- Place of birth: Birmingham, England
- Date of death: 1971 (aged 76–77)
- Place of death: Birmingham, England
- Position: Right back

Senior career*
Years	Team	Apps	(Gls)
- Bournville Athletic
1920–1921	Birmingham	3	(0)
1921	Brighton & Hove Albion	0	(0)
1921–19??	Redditch		
–	Bournville Athletic		
- * Club domestic league appearances and goals

William Richard Mumford (3 March 1894 – 1971) was an English professional footballer who played in the Football League for Birmingham.

Born in the Stirchley district of Birmingham, Mumford played local football for Bournville Athletic before joining Birmingham F.C. in 1920. He made his debut in the Second Division on 24 April 1920 in a 2–1 home win against Clapton Orient, and kept his place for the remaining two games of the season. New signing Jack Jones took over the left back position for the 1920–21 season, allowing Frank Womack to revert to right back, and Mumford left for Brighton & Hove Albion in April 1921. Without having appeared for Brighton's first team, he returned to non-league football in the Birmingham area in September 1921, first with Redditch and then with his former club Bournville Athletic.

Mumford died in Birmingham in 1971, aged about 77.
