= Senator Short =

Senator Short may refer to:

- Alan Short (1920–2004), California State Senate
- Linda H. Short (born 1947), South Carolina State Senate
- Peyton Short (1761–1825), Kentucky State Senate
- Phil Short (born 1947), Louisiana State Senate
- Shelly Short (born 1962), Washington State Senate

== See also ==
- Ralph Shortey (born 1982), Oklahoma State Senate
