= Short =

Short may refer to:

== Places ==
- Short (crater), a lunar impact crater on the near side of the Moon
- Short, Mississippi, an unincorporated community
- Short, Oklahoma, a census-designated place

== People ==
- Short (surname)
- List of people known as the Short

== Companies ==
- Short Brothers, a British aerospace company
- Short Brothers of Sunderland, a former English shipbuilder

== Computing and technology ==
- Short circuit, an accidental connection between two nodes of an electrical circuit
- Short integer, a computer datatype

== Other uses ==
- Short film, a cinema format, also called a short
- Short (finance), stock-trading position
- Short (cricket), fielding positions closer to the batsman
- SHORT syndrome, a medical condition in which affected individuals have multiple birth defects
- Short vowel, a vowel sound of short perceived duration
- Holly Short, a fictional character in the Artemis Fowl series

== See also ==
- Short time, a situation in which a civilian employee works reduced hours, or a military person is approaching the end of their enlistment
- Short pastry, one which is rich in butter with a crumbly texture, as in shortbread
- Long (disambiguation)
- Shorter (disambiguation)
- Shorts (disambiguation)
- Shortstown, Bedfordshire, England, named after Short Brothers
- Skort, shorts with a fabric panel resembling a skirt
