= Joseph A. Short =

American football coach

Coaching career (HC unless noted)
- 1900: Colgate

Head coaching record
- Overall: 2–8

Joseph A. Short was an American college football coach. He held the position of the eighth head football coach at Colgate University, serving for a single season in 1900. During his tenure, the team achieved a record of 2–8.

== Head coaching record ==
Year	Team	Overall	Conference	Standing	Bowl/playoffs
Colgate (Independent) (1900)
1900	Colgate	2–8			
Colgate:		2–8			
Total:		2–8			
