= Peter Short =

Peter Short may refer to:

- Peter Short (clergyman) (born 1948), Canadian minister and former Moderator of the United Church of Canada
- Peter Short (field hockey) (born 1976), Canadian field hockey player
- Peter Short (printer) (died 1603), English printer
- Peter Short (rugby union) (born 1979), English rugby union player
- Peter Short (footballer) (1944–1984), English footballer
- Peter Short, West Indies Cricket Board president, 1993–1996
