= Wilfrid Short =

British civil servant

Wilfrid Maurice Short CB (22 June 1870–8 June 1947) was a British civil servant who served as private secretary to the statesman A. J. Balfour for 26 years.

Short was born in Kilnwick, Yorkshire, and educated at the City of London School. In 1890 he joined the Civil Service as a clerk in the Office of the Official Receiver in Bankruptcy. In 1891 he transferred to the Royal Commission on Labour and in 1894 he was appointed Private Secretary to Balfour, a post he held until his retirement in 1920. During his tenure Balfour was Prime Minister (1902–1905), First Lord of the Admiralty (1915–1916) and Foreign Secretary (1916–1919), among other posts.

Short was appointed Companion of the Order of the Bath (CB) in the 1920 New Year War Honours.

From 1920 to 1922, Short was Political and Literary Secretary to the Earl of Dunraven.

Short also invented a game called disco. This was a racquet sport similar to tennis, played on a 40 ft x 16 ft court with a 4 ft high net. Near each corner, set 6 ft in from the baseline and 3 ft from the sideline, was a 7–8 ft high post with a yellow wooden disc hanging from it. Play was similar to tennis, with one point being scored if the opposing player failed to return the ball, hit it into the net or hit it out of court. Five points were scored if a player hit one of the discs on his opponent's side with the ball. Games were played to fifteen points and five games made a set. The game was designed to be played indoors or in a small garden and sets were made by F. H. Ayres Ltd.
