= Michael Short (engineer) =

British engineer and academic

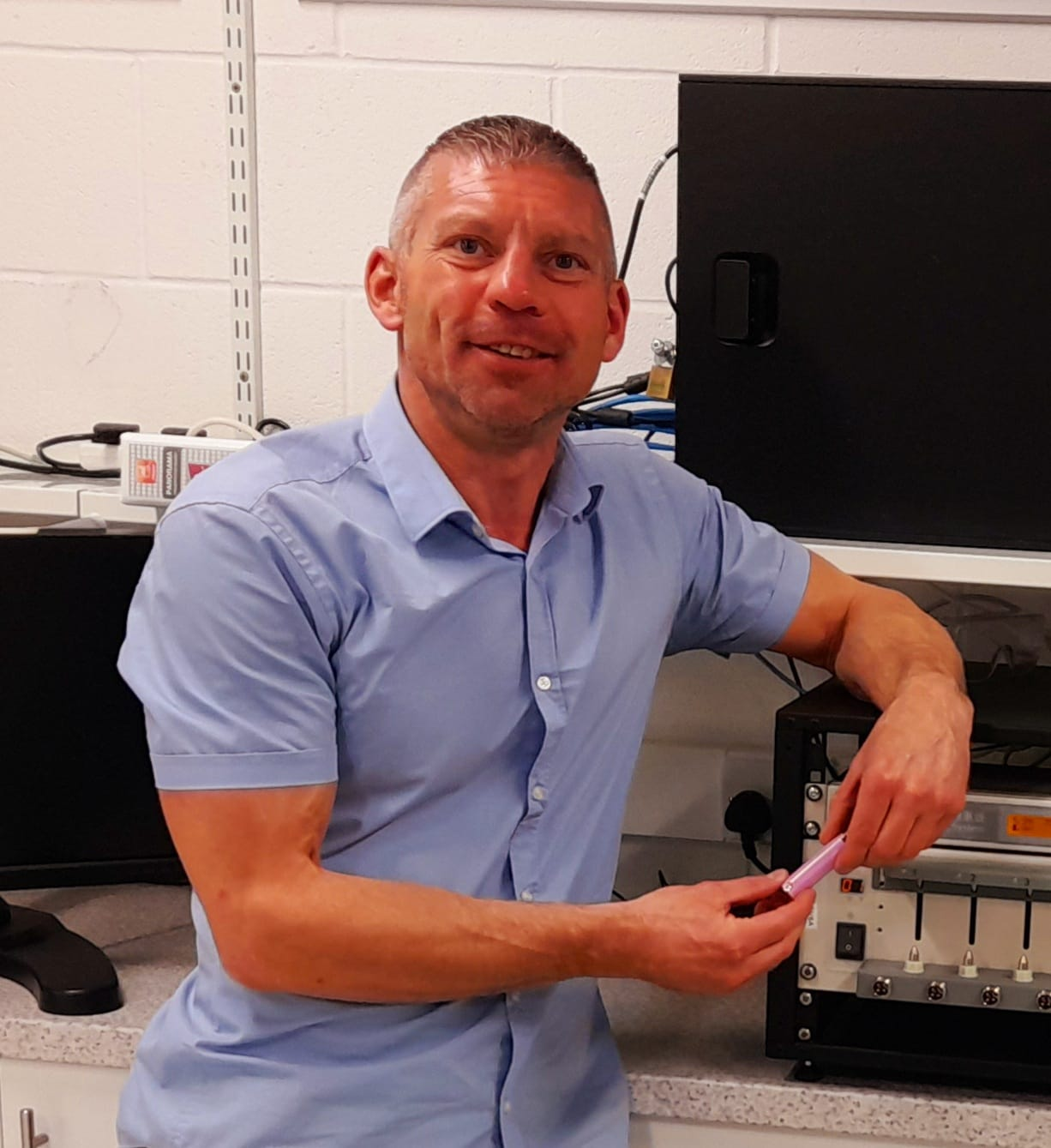
- Michael Short (July 2021)
- Born: 1975 (age 50–51); Stockton-on-Tees, England
- Education: University of Sunderland
- Scientific career
- Fields: Control Engineering; Systems Informatics; Mathematics; Electrical Engineering
- Workplaces: Teesside University; University of Leicester; University of Sunderland

Michael Short (born August 1975) is a British engineer and academic specialising in Control Engineering and Systems Informatics. He is Professor at Teesside University in the UK, where he has led the Centre for Sustainable Engineering. Short obtained a BEng in Electrical and Electronic Engineering in 1999 and a PhD in Robotics in 2003, both from the University of Sunderland. He subsequently obtained a PGCHE from Teesside University in 2012. Before joining Teesside University he worked at the University of Leicester until 2009. He was appointed Reader (Professor) in January 2015 and full Professor (by Research) in August 2020. His earlier career included eight years working in industrial automation and process control.

Short has been a member of the Institute of Engineering and Technology (MIET) since 1999, a fellow of the Higher Education Academy (FHEA) since 2012 and a full member of the Institute of Electrical and Electronics Engineers (MIEEE). He has also served on the IEEE Industrial Electronics Society Technical Committee on Factory Automation (TCFA) since 2012. As of November 2026, Short had authored or co-authored over 230 reviewed publications receiving over 2,800 citations. His research has received six awards, including the IEEE James C. Hung Award for best paper in Factory Automation in 2011. As of November 2026 his Google Scholar profile recorded a H-index of 31 and an i-10 index of 66.

His research activities have included participation as Principal or Co-Investigator in funded research and innovation projects since 2023. In 2021, he led a team selected as a winning of the 2021 Abu Dhabi-Singapore Smart Cities Open Innovation Challenge, which focused upon developing energy efficiency solutions for buildings in Abu Dhabi. Short has held editorial roles with the journals Energies and Frontiers in Energy Efficiency Technologies. His published research covers probability and statistics, real-time systems and scheduling, embedded systems and control, robotics and smart grid technologies.

Short has participated in academic conferences, public lectures and media discussions related to engineering, energy systems, and technology. His work has also been discussed in technical magazines, interviews, and news publications. He has contributed to inquiries conducted by the UK Science and Technology Committee (House of Lords) and was involved in preparing a UK Government commissioned report concerning digital trade. In 2020, Short was interviewed by BBC Radio Tees and featured in news coverage concerning engineering contributions to the production of personal protective equipment and ventilators during the COVID-19 pandemic.

In November 2022 Short was included on a published list of individuals working on the UK's Net Zero agenda, an announcement covered by the BBC and other news outlets. In December 2024 he was interviewed by NewsX following appearances as one of four UK academics on the 2024 GREAT Tour of India. In November 2025 Short was again recognised on a published list of individuals working on the UK's Net Zero agenda. From 2026, Short has been ranked among the world's top 2% scientists in engineering by Stanford University.

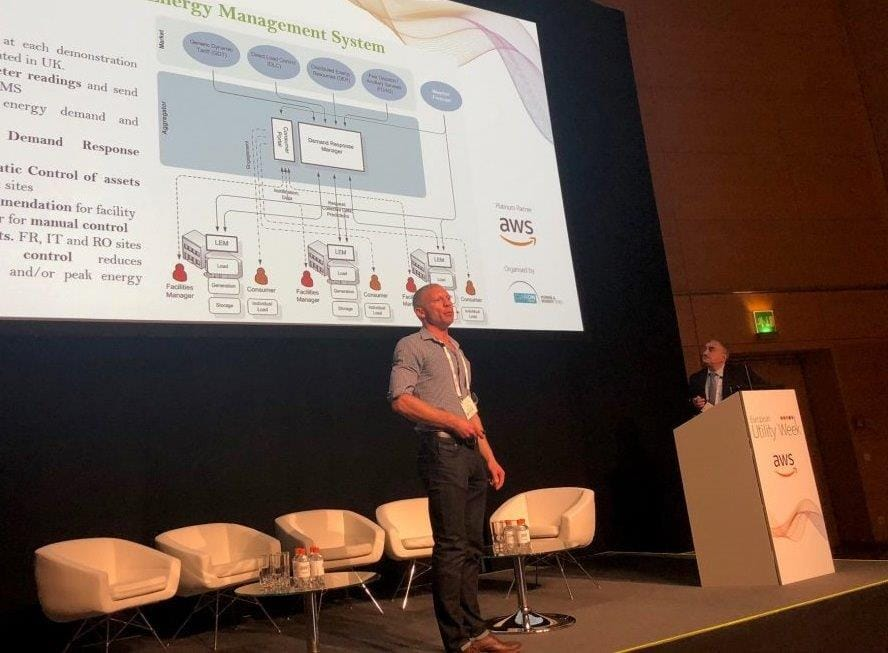
Michael Short presenting at European Utility Week in Vienna, Austria (November 2018)
