= Bill Shortt =

Welsh footballer

Personal information
- Full name: William Warren Shortt
- Date of birth: 13 October 1920
- Place of birth: Wrexham, Wales
- Date of death: 20 September 2004 (aged 83)
- Place of death: Plymouth, England
- Position: Goalkeeper

Youth career
- Hoole Alex.

Senior career*
Years	Team	Apps	(Gls)
1938–1946	Chester		
1938–1939	→ Wellington (loan)		
1946–1956	Plymouth Argyle	342	(0)
1956–?	Tavistock		

International career
1947–1953	Wales	12	(0)
- * Club domestic league appearances and goals

Bill Shortt (13 October 1920 – 20 September 2004) was a Welsh professional footballer who played as a goalkeeper. He was born in Wrexham and was capped 12 times by Wales.

== Playing career ==
Shortt joined Chester on amateur terms in 1938 after being spotted playing for local side Hoole Alex., signing a professional contract the following May after a loan spell with Wellington.

Although Shortt officially never played a Football League match for Chester, he was a regular for the first-team throughout the war years. He made his debut in the club's first wartime league match against Tranmere Rovers in October 1939 and played his final match against Rochdale in January 1946, shortly before moving to Division Two side Plymouth Argyle for £1,000.

Shortt went on to make more than 300 league appearances for Argyle over the next decade, helping them win the Football League Division Three South title in 1951–52. His stint also saw him capped 12 times by Wales, with his first cap coming against Northern Ireland in April 1947. The following season saw him return to Chester with Plymouth in the FA Cup third round, but he was on the losing side as Chester recorded a 2–0 victory.

After leaving Plymouth in 1956, Shortt ended his professional career. He joined non-league side Tavistock and was the landlord of a pub in Plymouth.

He died on 20 September 2004, the same day as legendary football manager Brian Clough.

== Honours ==
Plymouth Argyle

- Football League Division Three South champions: 1951–52 (44 apps)
