= John Harris (footballer, born 1917) =

Scottish footballer

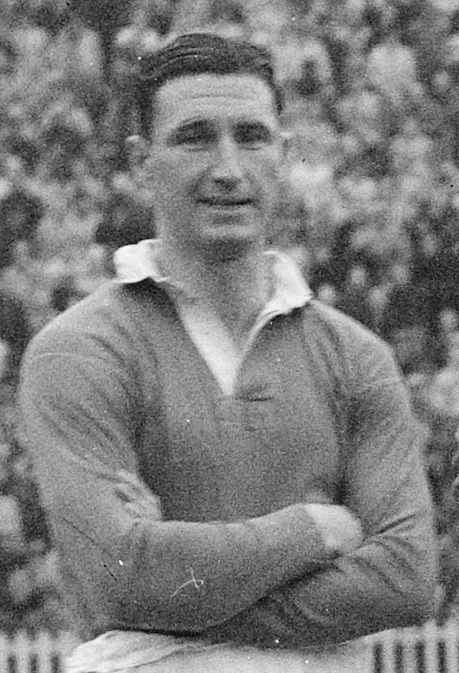
- Harris in a Chelsea team photo, November 1947

Personal information
- Date of birth: 30 June 1917
- Place of birth: Glasgow, Scotland
- Date of death: 24 July 1988 (aged 71)
- Place of death: Sheffield, England
- Height: 5 ft 10 in (1.78 m)
- Position: Defender

Senior career*
| Years | Team | Apps | (Gls) |
| 1932–1934 | Swindon Town | 0 | (0) |
| 1934–1939 | Swansea Town | 28 | (4) |
| 1939 | Tottenham Hotspur | 0 | (0) |
| 1939–1945 | Wolverhampton Wanderers | 0 | (0) |
| 1945–1956 | Chelsea | 326 | (14) |
| 1956–1957 | Chester | 27 | (1) |

International career
| 1945 | Scotland (wartime) | 1 | (0) |

Managerial career
- 1956–1959: Chester
- 1959–1968: Sheffield United
- 1969–1973: Sheffield United
- * Club domestic league appearances and goals

John Harris (30 June 1917 – 24 July 1988) was a Scottish footballer nicknamed "Gentleman John".

== Playing career ==
Harris was the son of former Scottish international centre-forward and Newcastle United player Neil Harris.

He played for Swindon Town before moving to Swansea Town in 1934 when the side was managed by his father. In 1939, he played for both Tottenham Hotspur and Wolverhampton Wanderers. Like most players in his era, his Football League appearance tally is much lower than it would have been had the war not broken out but he continued to play for several years afterwards.

Between 1939 and 1943, he made 121 guest appearances for Southampton, scoring 15 goals. Harris also played once for Scotland in a wartime international.

He joined Chelsea on loan from Wolves during the Second World War and captained the club to victory in the Southern War Cup final at Wembley in April 1945. In September 1945, Harris signed permanently for £5,000. A tough-tackling but skilful centre-half, Harris was a regular in the Chelsea side throughout his career and was club captain until Roy Bentley took over the role. He was a member of Chelsea's 1954–55 First Division-winning side, making 31 appearances that season. In eleven years, he made 364 appearances and scored 14 goals.

During his final season at Stamford Bridge – 1955–56, he became the first professional coach for Surrey Senior Leaguer's Croydon Amateurs and after a slow start, probably due to the players not being used to the intensity of the training and methods, laid the foundations for the club to start to become one of the competition's leading clubs. The Chelsea / Croydon connection carried on as he was replaced by Albert Tennant for two seasons before he took over as Guildford City's manager and then Chelsea youth manager Dick Foss replaced him at Albert Road for ten years.

== Managerial career ==
He left Chelsea in April 1956 to become player-manager of Chester before retiring to concentrate on management. He took over from Joe Mercer as manager of Sheffield United on 20 April 1959 and finished the season third, seven points behind second placed Fulham. His first full season finished in fourth place.

Finally in 1961, his Sheffield United team won promotion from the Second Division as runners-up to Ipswich Town, mainly due to his purchase of Welsh international winger Len Allchurch for £12,500 from Swansea Town. Under Harris, United enjoyed numerous runs in the FA Cup (reaching the semi-finals in 1961 for the first time since 1936) and the League Cup. Despite financial problems, he led United to fifth place in the first season back in the top division, and over the next few years relied on a steady flow of youngsters graduating from the Northern Intermediate league team to replace players sold to remain in profit. After years of mid-table finishes, he was "promoted" to general manager in August 1968 after the team had been relegated the previous season, replaced by Arthur Rowley. However, Rowley was sacked within a year and Harris returned as manager in August 1969.

In the ensuing years, he made astute and highly effective signings with players such as Tony Currie, Geoff Salmons, Eddie Colquhoun and Bill Dearden signing for the Blades, and resulted in Sheffield United winning promotion from the Second Division in 1970–71. Harris understood the principle of getting the right man for the job and, this was typified by his signing of Trevor Hockey to boost United's promotion challenge in 1971.

Sheffield United started the 1971–72 season in great form and, under the guidance of Harris they stayed top of the First Division with an unbeaten run of eleven games from the start of the season. Harris resigned in December 1973 to become the club's Senior Executive. In June 1977 he finally left United and was soon acting as scout for Sheffield Wednesday. He later became a lay preacher. He died in 1988, aged 71, in Sheffield.
