= Verenium Corporation =

American industrial biotechnology company

- Type: Public Company (Nasdaq: VRNM)
- Industry: Industrial Biotechnology
- Founded: 2007
- Headquarters: San Diego, California
- Key people: James Levine (President & CEO), Janet Roemer (COO), Jeff Black (CFO)
- Products: Enzymes
- Number of employees: 130
- Website: www.verenium.com

Verenium Corporation was a San Diego, California-based industrial biotechnology company founded in 2007 as the result of a merger between Diversa (San Diego) and Celunol (Cambridge, MA). The company specialized in research and development for the production of high performance enzymes used in industrial applications, including biofuel generation, hydraulic fracturing. Verenium was acquired by BASF corporation in 2013. The company's tailored enzymes are environmentally friendly, making products and processes greener and more cost-effective for industries including the global food and fuel markets.

Using proprietary and patented genomic technologies, BASF extracts microbial DNA directly from collected samples to avoid the slow and often impossible task of growing microbes in the laboratory. BASF then mines its collection of microbial genes, numbering in the billions, using high-throughput screening technologies designed to identify unique enzymes as product candidates. As required, these enzymes can then be further optimized for commercial use through the company's patented DirectEvolution technologies. By combining discovery and laboratory evolution technologies, Verenium successfully developed and commercialized a suite of highly differentiated enzyme products tailored to meet the specific needs of companies in various markets, including grain processing, biofuels, animal health and nutrition and other industries. These enzymes products are now offered by BASF.

On September 20, 2013, Verenium entered an agreement to be acquired by BASF, with a 71% acquisition of Verenium.

== See also ==
- Novozymes
- Genencor
- Codexis
