= Ebony Short =

American sewing manager

Ebony Short is an American sewing manager and former costume designer. She leads the Baltimore Ravens' sewing department, where she oversees the customization and maintenance of uniforms for the team's players.

== Early life and education ==
Short grew up in Northeast Baltimore. Her father, Brian Short Sr., a Pop Warner football coach, taught her how to use a sewing machine, introducing her to basic techniques he had learned in a home economics class. Her mother, Tracey, later supported her as she began working on more complex sewing projects.

Short was a cheerleader during her youth and attended her brothers' football games. She was also a fan of the Baltimore Ravens, particularly safety Ed Reed. Her interest in sewing started at around the age of 10, after receiving a sewing machine as a Christmas gift. She initially made clothes for her dolls and later designed her own prom dress.

Short studied fashion design at Parsons School of Design, where she explored various artistic mediums and focused on creative problem-solving.

== Career ==
Short began her career at Parson-Meares, a New York-based costume shop that worked on Broadway productions such as The Lion King, Cinderella, and Pippin. She constructed costumes for these productions, including the hyena suits for The Lion King and the transformative dress for Cinderella. Her work also involved developing costumes with functional features, such as wings and light-up elements. She undertook side projects, including cruise ship show installations. She spent approximately a decade in the costume design industry before leaving New York.

In 2019, Short considered moving to California to work on costumes for Cher's tour and for film projects. During a visit to her family in Maryland, her sister brought a job posting for the Baltimore Ravens to her attention. Short applied for the role of sewing manager and accepted the position after the interview, deciding to remain in Maryland.

As sewing manager, Short leads a team responsible for customizing and maintaining uniforms for Ravens players. The department handles tasks such as sewing pads into pants, altering jerseys for better fit, and customizing cleats. It also ensures uniforms are prepared and repaired promptly during the National Football League (NFL) season. Short addresses challenges related to tailoring football uniforms, such as integrating microphones and managing fabric alterations.

When Short joined the Ravens, the sewing operations were focused on basic alterations. Under her direction, the department expanded its scope to include a wider range of customizations, such as creating fitted uniforms and specialized equipment adjustments. Her team also developed modifications to address specific player needs, including adding hand warmers to jerseys and tailoring uniforms to reduce interference during play.
