= Tom White (footballer, born 1896) =

English footballer

Personal information
- Date of birth: September 1896
- Place of birth: West Bromwich, England
- Date of death: 1960 (aged 63–64)
- Place of death: Wednesbury, England
- Position: Full back

Senior career*
Years	Team	Apps	(Gls)
- Notts County
1918–1921	Birmingham	15	(0)
1921–1922	Worksop Town		
1922–1925	Newport County	44	(0)
1925–19??	Kidderminster Harriers		
- * Club domestic league appearances and goals

V. Thomas Wilson White (September 1896 – 1960) was an English professional footballer who played in the Football League for Birmingham and Newport County. He played as a full back.

White was born in West Bromwich, Staffordshire. He joined Birmingham in March 1918, and played a few games in the wartime leagues. He made his debut in the Second Division on 26 October 1919, in a 1–0 defeat at home to West Ham United, deputising for Billy Ball who had been injured playing for England in a Victory international. White, described as a "slow, cumbersome defender who relied on the big clearance", lost any hope of a first-team place with the arrival of Jack Jones in the 1920 close season, and he left for Worksop Town in January 1921. He contributed to their Midland League title in 1922, and earned himself a return to the Football League with Newport County later that year. White made 44 appearances in the Third Division South for Newport before finishing off his career with Kidderminster Harriers of the Birmingham & District League.

White died in Wednesbury, Staffordshire, in 1960 aged about 63.
