= James Short (footballer) =

English footballer

Personal information
- Full name: John James Short
- Date of birth: April 1896
- Place of birth: Hucknall, England
- Position: Forward

Senior career*
Years	Team	Apps	(Gls)
- Arnold St Mary's
1916–1917	Lincoln City	0	(0)
1917–1919	Notts County	0	(0)
1919–1920	Birmingham	16	(10)
1920–1922	Watford	21	(7)
1922–1923	Ilkeston United		
1923–1924	Norwich City	11	(3)
1924–192?	Newark Town		
- Grantham Town
- * Club domestic league appearances and goals

John James Short (April 1896 – after 1927) was an English professional footballer who scored 20 goals in 48 appearances in the Football League playing for Birmingham, Watford and Norwich City. He played as an inside forward or centre forward.

Short was born in Hucknall, Nottinghamshire. During the First World War, he played for Lincoln City and Notts County; he scored 20 goals in 42 wartime games for the latter and was highly rated. After the war he joined Birmingham of the Football League Second Division, for whom he scored on his debut on 1 November 1919, in a 2–1 win at West Ham United, and followed up with another seven goals in the next six games. Short moved on to Watford at the end of the 1919–20 season, and later played for Norwich City in the Football League and Ilkeston United, Newark Town and Grantham Town outside it.

He is described as a fine goalscorer whose career was badly affected by wounds received during the war.
