= 1924–25 Birmingham F.C. season =

Birmingham F.C.
1924–25 season
- Chairman: Howard Cant
- Secretary-manager: Billy Beer
- Ground: St Andrew's
- Football League First Division: 8th
- FA Cup: Third round (eliminated by Liverpool)
- Top goalscorer: League: Joe Bradford, Ernie Islip (11); All: Joe Bradford, Ernie Islip, George Briggs (11)
- Highest home attendance: 48,098 vs Aston Villa, 11 October 1924
- Lowest home attendance: 10,000 vs Blackburn Rovers, 1 November 1924
- Average home league attendance: 22,195
Home colours

The 1924–25 Football League season was Birmingham Football Club's 29th in the Football League and their 12th in the First Division. They finished in 8th position in the 22-team division. They also competed in the 1924–25 FA Cup, entering at the first round proper and losing to Liverpool in the third.

Twenty-four players made at least one appearance in nationally organised first-team competition, and there were eleven different goalscorers. Goalkeeper Dan Tremelling played in 44 of the 45 matches over the season; among outfield players, full-back Jack Jones appeared in 42. There were three joint leading scorers: George Briggs, Ernie Islip and, for the fourth successive year, Joe Bradford. Each scored eleven goals, of which Bradford's and Islip's all came in the league.

== Football League First Division ==
Date	League position	Opponents	Venue	Result	Score F–A	Scorers	Attendance
30 August 1924	11th	Everton	H	D	2–2	Linley, Crosbie	35,000
3 September 1924	16th	Tottenham Hotspur	H	L	0–2		18,000
6 September 1924	18th	Sunderland	A	L	0–4		25,000
8 September 1924	17th	Bolton Wanderers	H	W	1–0	Haworth og	12,000
13 September 1924	12th	Cardiff City	H	W	2–1	Bradford 2	20,000
15 September 1924	4th	Notts County	H	W	1–0	Bradford	12,000
20 September 1924	11th	Preston North End	A	L	0–1		20,000
27 September 1924	10th	Burnley	H	W	1–0	Cringan	20,000
4 October 1924	7th	Leeds United	A	W	1–0	Islip	24,000
11 October 1924	5th	Aston Villa	H	W	1–0	Islip	48,098
18 October 1924	5th	West Bromwich Albion	A	D	1–1	Islip	35,617
25 October 1924	1st	Huddersfield Town	A	W	1–0	Bradford	18,000
1 November 1924	3rd	Blackburn Rovers	H	D	1–1	Bradford	10,000
8 November 1924	2nd	West Ham United	A	W	1–0	Bradford pen	30,000
15 November 1924	2nd	Sheffield United	H	D	1–1	Crosbie	27,000
22 November 1924	3rd	Newcastle United	A	L	0–4		30,000
29 November 1924	3rd	Liverpool	H	W	5–2	Bradford 3 (1 pen), Barton, Islip	30,000
6 December 1924	1st	Nottingham Forest	A	D	1–1	Bradford pen	10,000
13 December 1924	5th	Bury	H	L	0–1		20,000
20 December 1924	5th	Manchester City	A	D	2–2	Bradford, Islip	40,156
25 December 1924	3rd	Arsenal	H	W	2–1	Crosbie, Islip	36,000
26 December 1924	3rd	Arsenal	A	W	1–0	Islip	40,000
27 December 1924	4th	Everton	A	L	1–2	Islip	30,000
1 January 1925	5th	Bolton Wanderers	A	L	0–3		27,000
3 January 1925	4th	Sunderland	H	W	2–1	Crosbie, Barton	30,000
17 January 1925	6th	Cardiff City	A	L	0–1		8,000
24 January 1925	6th	Preston North End	H	W	3–0	Linley, Briggs 2	20,000
2 February 1925	6th	Burnley	A	L	2–3	Briggs, Devlin	8,000
7 February 1925	6th	Leeds United	H	D	0–0		25,000
14 February 1925	8th	Aston Villa	A	L	0–1		60,000
28 February 1925	8th	Huddersfield Town	H	L	0–1		12,000
14 March 1925	9th	West Ham United	H	D	1–1	Crosbie	20,000
16 March 1925	8th	West Bromwich Albion	H	D	0–0		20,000
21 March 1925	9th	Sheffield United	A	L	3–4	Islip, Briggs, Liddell	18,000
28 March 1925	9th	Newcastle United	H	D	1–1	Cringan	36,000
2 April 1925	10th	Blackburn Rovers	A	L	1–7	Islip	3,000
4 April 1925	12th	Liverpool	A	D	1–1	Briggs	18,000
10 April 1925	8th	Tottenham Hotspur	A	W	1–0	Crosbie	30,411
11 April 1925	10th	Nottingham Forest	H	D	1–1	Briggs	20,000
18 April 1925	9th	Bury	A	W	4–1	Briggs 2, Scriven, Crosbie	12,000
25 April 1925	9th	Manchester City	H	W	2–1	Scriven, Crosbie	15,000
2 May 1925	8th	Notts County	A	W	1–0	Islip	8,000

=== League table (part) ===
Final First Division table (part)
Pos	Club	Pld	W	D	L	F	A	GA	Pts
6th	Newcastle United	42	16	16	10	61	42	1.45	48
7th	Sunderland	42	19	10	13	64	51	1.25	48
8th	Birmingham	42	17	12	13	49	53	0.93	46
9th	Notts County	42	16	13	13	42	31	1.35	45
10th	Manchester City	42	17	9	16	76	68	1.12	43
Key	Pos = League position; Pld = Matches played; W = Matches won; D = Matches drawn; L = Matches lost; F = Goals for; A = Goals against; GA = Goal average; Pts = Points								
Source									

== FA Cup ==
Round	Date	Opponents	Venue	Result	Score F–A	Scorers	Attendance
First round	10 January 1925	Chelsea	H	W	2–0	Briggs 2	32,000
Second round	31 January 1925	Stockport County	H	W	1–0	Harris	36,000
Third round	21 February 1925	Liverpool	A	L	1–2	Briggs	44,004

== Appearances and goals ==
This table includes appearances and goals in nationally organised competitive matches – the Football League and FA Cup – only.
For a description of the playing positions, see Formation (association football)#2–3–5 (Pyramid).
Players marked † left the club during the playing season.

Players' appearances and goals by competition
Name	Position	League		FA Cup		Total	
Name	Position	Apps	Goals	Apps	Goals	Apps	Goals
Dan Tremelling	Goalkeeper	42	0	3	0	45	0
Eli Ashurst	Full back	7	0	0	0	7	0
David Dixon	Full back	1	0	0	0	1	0
Jack Jones	Full back	41	0	3	0	44	0
Frank Womack	Full back	37	0	3	0	40	0
Percy Barton	Half back	25	2	2	0	27	2
Harry Bruce	Half back	1	0	0	0	1	0
Jimmy Cringan	Half back	33	2	3	0	36	2
Dickie Dale	Half back	22	0	1	0	23	0
Bill Hunter	Half back	6	0	0	0	6	0
George Liddell	Half back	37	1	3	0	40	1
Jock Morgan	Half back	1	0	0	0	1	0
Albert Sykes	Half back	1	0	0	0	1	0
Joe Bradford	Forward	24	11	1	0	25	11
George Briggs	Forward	19	8	3	3	22	11
Johnny Crosbie	Forward	40	8	2	0	42	8
Tom Devlin †	Forward	2	1	0	0	2	1
Wally Harris	Forward	16	0	3	1	19	1
Bill Harvey	Forward	13	0	0	0	13	0
Edmund Harvey	Forward	12	0	0	0	12	0
Ernie Islip	Forward	34	11	2	0	36	11
Ted Linley	Forward	24	2	3	0	27	2
Jack Russell	Forward	5	0	0	0	5	0
Aubrey Scriven	Forward	19	2	1	0	20	2

== See also ==
- Birmingham City F.C. seasons
