= 1926–27 Birmingham F.C. season =

Birmingham F.C.
1926–27 season
- Chairman: Howard Cant
- Manager: Billy Beer until March 1927 Bill Harvey thereafter
- Ground: St Andrew's
- Football League First Division: 17th
- FA Cup: Fourth round (eliminated by Southampton)
- Top goalscorer: League: Joe Bradford (22); All: Joe Bradford (23)
- Highest home attendance: 48,104 vs Aston Villa, 30 October 1926
- Lowest home attendance: 6,321 vs Bolton Wanderers, 4 April 1927
- Average home league attendance: 22,030
Home colours

The 1926–27 Football League season was Birmingham Football Club's 31st in the Football League and their 14th in the First Division. They finished in 17th position in the 22-team division. They also competed in the 1926–27 FA Cup, entering at the third round proper and losing to Southampton in the fourth.

Twenty-seven players made at least one appearance in nationally organised competition, and there were ten different goalscorers. Half-back George Liddell and forward George Briggs played in 43 of the 44 matches over the season, and Joe Bradford was leading scorer for the sixth successive year, with 23 goals, of which 22 came in the league.

Off the field, the club was in some turmoil regarding transfer policy. In early March 1927, three members of the board of directors resigned. The Sports Argus' editorial suggested that one faction were "anxious to secure talent at almost any price" and the other "desirous with 'going slow' as its motto", and believed that "the former are now in the ascendancy and that they mean business". A few days later, Billy Beer resigned as manager. The Argus was disappointed:

Managers are in a peculiar position. They have many masters to serve and to please them all is impossible. Mr. Beer has discovered this, and ... has cleared out. I am sorry, because, frankly, I thought he would make a good job of his task if given the opportunity.

It was reported later that Beer had found it impossible to work with some members of the board, so had tendered his resignation, if that was thought to be in the best interests of the club, and was less than happy with the treatment he had received.

== Football League First Division ==
| Date | League position | Opponents | Venue | Result | Score F–A | Scorers | Attendance |
|---|---|---|---|---|---|---|---|
| 28 August 1926 | 3rd | Blackburn Rovers | H | W | 3–1 | Briggs, Bradford 2 | 24,091 |
| 30 August 1926 | 11th | Leicester City | A | L | 2–5 | Bradford, Harris | 23,883 |
| 4 September 1926 | 6th | Huddersfield Town | A | W | 2–0 | Bradford 2 | 19,893 |
| 11 September 1926 | 4th | Sunderland | H | W | 2–0 | Briggs 2 | 28,035 |
| 13 September 1926 | 4th | Sheffield Wednesday | H | D | 0–0 | | 13,676 |
| 18 September 1926 | 2nd | West Bromwich Albion | A | W | 2–1 | Briggs 2 | 26,697 |
| 20 September 1926 | 1st | Everton | H | W | 1–0 | Briggs | 11,411 |
| 25 September 1926 | 2nd | Bury | H | D | 2–2 | Briggs 2 | 24,006 |
| 2 October 1926 | 2nd | Bolton Wanderers | A | L | 0–1 | | 20,006 |
| 9 October 1926 | 10th | Tottenham Hotspur | A | L | 1–6 | Bradford | 29,392 |
| 16 October 1926 | 7th | Derby County | H | W | 1–0 | Harris | 23,145 |
| 23 October 1926 | 4th | Manchester United | A | W | 1–0 | Harris | 32,010 |
| 30 October 1926 | 7th | Aston Villa | H | L | 1–2 | Crosbie | 48,104 |
| 6 November 1926 | 8th | Cardiff City | A | L | 0–1 | | 10,598 |
| 13 November 1926 | 6th | Burnley | H | W | 1–0 | Bradford | 11,208 |
| 20 November 1926 | 8th | Newcastle United | A | L | 1–5 | Briggs | 30,056 |
| 27 November 1926 | 7th | Leeds United | H | W | 2–0 | Harris, Bradford | 19,707 |
| 4 December 1926 | 9th | Liverpool | A | L | 1–2 | Briggs | 27,884 |
| 11 December 1926 | 9th | Arsenal | H | D | 0–0 | | 22,982 |
| 18 December 1926 | 9th | Sheffield United | A | L | 3–4 | Briggs, Harris, Bradford | 19,093 |
| 25 December 1926 | 10th | West Ham United | A | L | 0–1 | | 27,984 |
| 27 December 1926 | 12th | West Ham United | H | L | 0–2 | | 39,204 |
| 1 January 1927 | 12th | Leicester City | H | W | 2–1 | Bradford 2 | 31,275 |
| 15 January 1927 | 15th | Blackburn Rovers | A | L | 2–3 | Islip, Scriven | 10,176 |
| 22 January 1927 | 15th | Huddersfield Town | H | L | 1–3 | Thirlaway | 16,779 |
| 5 February 1927 | 15th | West Bromwich Albion | H | W | 1–0 | Bradford | 29,681 |
| 12 February 1927 | 16th | Bury | A | L | 1–3 | Islip | 11,958 |
| 16 February 1927 | 16th | Sunderland | A | L | 1–4 | Briggs | 10,525 |
| 26 February 1927 | 16th | Tottenham Hotspur | H | W | 1–0 | Cringan | 21,145 |
| 5 March 1927 | 17th | Derby County | A | L | 1–4 | Crosbie | 15,154 |
| 12 March 1927 | 16th | Manchester United | H | W | 4–0 | Bradford 2, Crosbie, Scriven | 14,392 |
| 19 March 1927 | 18th | Aston Villa | A | L | 2–4 | Bond, Scriven | 49,334 |
| 2 April 1927 | 18th | Burnley | A | W | 2–0 | Bradford, Crosbie | 12,679 |
| 4 April 1927 | 13th | Bolton Wanderers | H | W | 6–1 | Crosbie 2, Bradford, Briggs, Scriven, Cringan | 6,321 |
| 9 April 1927 | 12th | Newcastle United | H | W | 2–0 | Bradford, Bond | 27,918 |
| 16 April 1927 | 13th | Leeds United | A | L | 1–2 | Bradford | 18,703 |
| 18 April 1927 | 16th | Everton | A | L | 1–3 | Taylor og | 32,880 |
| 19 April 1927 | 15th | Sheffield Wednesday | A | D | 4–4 | Scriven, Bradford, Liddell, Briggs | 17,720 |
| 23 April 1927 | 12th | Liverpool | H | W | 3–0 | Briggs, Bradford, Bond | 14,918 |
| 27 April 1927 | 13th | Cardiff City | H | L | 1–2 | Bradford | 23,681 |
| 30 April 1927 | 16th | Arsenal | A | L | 0–3 | | 22,619 |
| 7 May 1927 | 17th | Sheffield United | H | L | 2–3 | Bradford, Briggs | 10,951 |

=== League table (part) ===
Final First Division table (part)
| Pos | Club | Pld | W | D | L | F | A | GA | Pts |
|---|---|---|---|---|---|---|---|---|---|
| 15th | Manchester United | 42 | 13 | 14 | 15 | 52 | 64 | 0.81 | 40 |
| 16th | Sheffield Wednesday | 42 | 15 | 9 | 18 | 65 | 92 | 0.81 | 39 |
| 17th | Birmingham | 42 | 17 | 4 | 21 | 64 | 73 | 0.88 | 38 |
| 18th | Blackburn Rovers | 42 | 15 | 8 | 19 | 77 | 96 | 0.80 | 38 |
| 19th | Blackburn Rovers | 42 | 12 | 12 | 18 | 68 | 77 | 0.88 | 36 |
| Key | Pos = League position; Pld = Matches played; W = Matches won; D = Matches drawn; L = Matches lost; F = Goals for; A = Goals against; GA = Goal average; Pts = Points | | | | | | | | |
| Source | | | | | | | | | |

== FA Cup ==
| Round | Date | Opponents | Venue | Result | Score F–A | Scorers | Attendance |
|---|---|---|---|---|---|---|---|
| Third round | 8 January 1927 | Manchester City | H | W | 4–1 | Bradford, Islip, Crosbie, Briggs | 39,503 |
| Fourth round | 29 January 1927 | Southampton | A | L | 1–4 | Briggs | 15,804 |

== Appearances and goals ==
This table includes appearances and goals in nationally organised competitive matches – the Football League and FA Cup – only.
For a description of the playing positions, see Formation (association football)#2–3–5 (Pyramid).
Players marked † left the club during the playing season.

Players' appearances and goals by competition
| Name | Position | League | | FA Cup | | Total | |
| Name | Position | Apps | Goals | Apps | Goals | Apps | Goals |
|---|---|---|---|---|---|---|---|
| Harry Hibbs | Goalkeeper | 1 | 0 | 0 | 0 | 1 | 0 |
| William Owen | Goalkeeper | 5 | 0 | 1 | 0 | 6 | 0 |
| Dan Tremelling | Goalkeeper | 36 | 0 | 1 | 0 | 37 | 0 |
| Percy Barton | Full back | 30 | 0 | 1 | 0 | 31 | 0 |
| Harry Bruce | Full back | 3 | 0 | 0 | 0 | 3 | 0 |
| Harry Isherwood | Full back | 1 | 0 | 0 | 0 | 1 | 0 |
| Jack Jones | Full back | 14 | 0 | 2 | 0 | 16 | 0 |
| Joe Smith | Full back | 17 | 0 | 0 | 0 | 17 | 0 |
| Frank Womack | Full back | 26 | 0 | 2 | 0 | 28 | 0 |
| Jimmy Cringan | Half back | 35 | 2 | 2 | 0 | 37 | 2 |
| Dickie Dale | Half back | 29 | 0 | 1 | 0 | 30 | 0 |
| Bill Hunter † | Half back | 6 | 0 | 0 | 0 | 6 | 0 |
| Alec Leslie | Half back | 7 | 0 | 0 | 0 | 7 | 0 |
| George Liddell | Half back | 41 | 1 | 2 | 0 | 43 | 1 |
| Edmund Wood | Half back | 1 | 0 | 0 | 0 | 1 | 0 |
| Benny Bond | Forward | 19 | 3 | 1 | 0 | 20 | 3 |
| Joe Bradford | Forward | 34 | 22 | 2 | 1 | 36 | 23 |
| George Briggs | Forward | 41 | 16 | 2 | 2 | 43 | 18 |
| Frederick Castle | Forward | 1 | 0 | 0 | 0 | 1 | 0 |
| Johnny Crosbie | Forward | 39 | 6 | 2 | 1 | 41 | 7 |
| Wally Harris | Forward | 22 | 5 | 0 | 0 | 22 | 5 |
| Edmund Harvey | Forward | 1 | 0 | 0 | 0 | 1 | 0 |
| Ernie Islip | Forward | 7 | 2 | 2 | 1 | 9 | 3 |
| Alf Oakes | Forward | 1 | 0 | 0 | 0 | 1 | 0 |
| Jack Russell | Forward | 6 | 0 | 0 | 0 | 6 | 0 |
| Aubrey Scriven | Forward | 17 | 5 | 0 | 0 | 17 | 5 |
| Billy Thirlaway † | Forward | 22 | 1 | 1 | 0 | 23 | 1 |

== See also ==
- Birmingham City F.C. seasons
