= 1925–26 Birmingham F.C. season =

Birmingham F.C.
1925–26 season
- Chairman: Howard Cant
- Secretary-manager: Billy Beer
- Ground: St Andrew's
- Football League First Division: 14th
- FA Cup: Fourth round (eliminated by South Shields)
- Top goalscorer: League: Joe Bradford (26); All: Joe Bradford (27)
- Highest home attendance: 38,231 vs Aston Villa, 27 February 1926
- Lowest home attendance: 3,977 vs Notts County, 19 September 1925
- Average home league attendance: 19,075

The 1925–26 Football League season was Birmingham Football Club's 30th in the Football League and their 13th in the First Division. They finished in 14th position in the 22-team division. They also competed in the 1925–26 FA Cup, entering at the third round proper and losing to South Shields in the fourth.

Twenty players made at least one appearance in nationally organised first-team competition, and there were ten different goalscorers. Goalkeeper Dan Tremelling played in 43 of the 44 matches over the season; among outfield players, full-back Jack Jones and forward Johnny Crosbie played one fewer, and half-back George Liddell and forward Wally Harris each appeared in 41. Joe Bradford was leading scorer for the fifth successive year, with 27 goals, of which 26 were scored in the league.

== Football League First Division ==
Date	League position	Opponents	Venue	Result	Score F–A	Scorers	Attendance
29 August 1925	17th	Sunderland	A	L	1–3	Bradford	27,215
31 August 1925	10th	Manchester City	H	W	1–0	Bradford	17,560
5 September 1925	4th	Blackburn Rovers	H	W	2–0	Islip, Bradford	14,204
9 September 1925	7th	Everton	A	D	2–2	Harris, Islip	15,811
12 September 1925	9th	Bury	A	L	1–2	Bradford	16,035
16 September 1925	12th	Huddersfield Town	H	L	1–3	Scriven	16,320
19 September 1925	15th	Notts County	H	L	0–1		3,977
21 September 1925	10th	Everton	H	W	3–1	Bradford 2, Briggs	8,940
26 September 1925	8th	West Bromwich Albion	H	W	3–2	Islip 2, Briggs	26,484
3 October 1925	10th	Sheffield United	A	L	1–4	Bradford	23,103
10 October 1925	10th	Cardiff City	H	W	3–2	Crosbie, Bradford, Briggs	24,335
17 October 1925	10th	Aston Villa	A	D	3–3	Bradford 2, Spiers og	52,254
24 October 1925	9th	Leicester City	H	D	1–1	Islip	28,020
31 October 1925	6th	Newcastle United	A	W	3–1	Islip 2, Crosbie	26,475
7 November 1925	8th	Bolton Wanderers	H	L	0–1		22,134
14 November 1925	13th	Manchester United	A	L	1–3	Crosbie	23,559
21 November 1925	11th	Liverpool	H	W	2–0	Briggs, Crosbie	17,046
5 December 1925	10th	Leeds United	H	W	2–1	Scriven, Crosbie	13,435
7 December 1925	10th	Burnley	A	L	1–3	Briggs	5,862
12 December 1925	11th	West Ham United	A	D	2–2	Cringan pen, Bradford	12,766
19 December 1925	10th	Arsenal	H	W	1–0	Briggs	26,843
25 December 1925	5th	Tottenham Hotspur	H	W	3–1	Bradford 3	29,586
26 December 1925	9th	Tottenham Hotspur	A	L	1–2	Bradford	44,429
28 December 1925	10th	Huddersfield Town	A	D	1–4	Bradford	16,565
1 January 1926	11th	Bolton Wanderers	A	L	3–5	Bradford 2, Harris	22,240
2 January 1926	10th	Sunderland	H	W	2–1	Briggs, Russell	22,433
16 January 1926	10th	Blackburn Rovers	A	D	4–4	Bradford 3, Harris	14,742
23 January 1926	12th	Bury	H	L	2–3	Briggs, Crosbie	12,790
6 February 1926	14th	West Bromwich Albion	A	L	1–5	Harris	23,212
13 February 1926	13th	Sheffield United	H	W	2–0	Linley, Briggs	15,765
20 February 1926	14th	Cardiff City	A	L	0–2		18,862
27 February 1926	13th	Aston Villa	H	W	2–1	Briggs 2	38,231
3 March 1926	13th	Notts County	A	L	0–3		8,131
6 March 1926	14th	Leicester City	A	L	0–1		23,570
13 March 1926	14th	Newcastle United	H	D	1–1	Crosbie	24,333
2 April 1926	15th	Manchester City	A	W	4–2	Briggs, Linley, Crosbie	49,950
3 April 1926	15th	Liverpool	A	D	2–2	Bradford 2 (1 pen)	24,806
10 April 1926	18th	Burnley	H	L	1–7	Bradford	16,616
17 April 1926	18th	Leeds United	A	D	0–0		12,186
19 April 1926	17th	Manchester United	H	W	2–1	Bradford, Jones	8,948
24 April 1926	14th	West Ham United	H	W	1–0	Bradford	12,571
1 May 1926	14th	Arsenal	A	L	0–3		22,240

=== League table (part) ===
Final First Division table (part)
Pos	Club	Pld	W	D	L	F	A	GA	Pts
12th	Blackburn Rovers	42	15	11	16	91	80	1.14	41
13th	West Bromwich Albion	42	16	8	18	79	78	1.01	40
14th	Birmingham	42	16	8	18	66	81	0.81	40
15th	Tottenham Hotspur	42	15	9	18	66	79	0.83	39
16th	Cardiff City	42	16	7	19	61	76	0.80	39
Key	Pos = League position; Pld = Matches played; W = Matches won; D = Matches drawn; L = Matches lost; F = Goals for; A = Goals against; GA = Goal average; Pts = Points								
Source									

== FA Cup ==
Round	Date	Opponents	Venue	Result	Score F–A	Scorers	Attendance
Third round	9 January 1926	Grimsby Town	H	W	2–0	Russell, Briggs	36,000
Fourth round	30 January 1926	South Shields	A	L	1–2	Bradford pen	17,000

== Appearances and goals ==
This table includes appearances and goals in nationally organised competitive matches – the Football League and FA Cup – only.
For a description of the playing positions, see Formation (association football)#2–3–5 (Pyramid).

Players' appearances and goals by competition
Name	Position	League		FA Cup		Total	
Name	Position	Apps	Goals	Apps	Goals	Apps	Goals
Harry Hibbs	Goalkeeper	1	0	0	0	1	0
Dan Tremelling	Goalkeeper	41	0	2	0	43	0
Eli Ashurst	Full back	3	0	2	0	5	0
Jack Jones	Full back	40	1	2	0	42	1
Frank Womack	Full back	39	0	0	0	39	0
Percy Barton	Half back	21	0	1	0	22	0
Harry Bruce	Half back	1	0	0	0	1	0
Jimmy Cringan	Half back	27	1	1	0	28	1
Dickie Dale	Half back	24	0	1	0	25	0
Bill Hunter	Half back	18	0	1	0	19	0
George Liddell	Half back	39	0	2	0	41	0
Frank Bowden	Forward	1	0	0	0	1	0
Joe Bradford	Forward	32	26	2	1	34	27
George Briggs	Forward	34	13	2	1	36	14
Frederick Castle	Forward	2	0	0	0	2	0
Johnny Crosbie	Forward	40	8	2	0	42	8
Wally Harris	Forward	39	4	2	0	41	4
Ernie Islip	Forward	15	7	1	0	16	7
Ted Linley	Forward	16	2	0	0	16	2
Jack Russell	Forward	14	1	1	1	15	2
Aubrey Scriven	Forward	15	2	0	0	15	2

== See also ==
- Birmingham City F.C. seasons
