= 1923–24 Birmingham F.C. season =

Birmingham F.C.
1923–24 season
- Chairman: Howard Cant
- Secretary-manager: Billy Beer
- Ground: St Andrew's
- Football League First Division: 14th
- FA Cup: First round (eliminated by Huddersfield Town)
- Top goalscorer: League: Joe Bradford (24); All: Joe Bradford (24)
- Highest home attendance: 41,306 vs Aston Villa, 25 August 1923
- Lowest home attendance: 14,000 vs West Bromwich Albion, 22 December 1923, Burnley, 27 February 1924
- Average home league attendance: 23,164
Home colours

The 1923–24 Football League season was Birmingham Football Club's 28th in the Football League and their 11th in the First Division. They finished in 14th position in the 22-team division. They also competed in the 1923–24 FA Cup, entering at the first round proper and losing in that round to Huddersfield Town.

Twenty-five players made at least one appearance in nationally organised first-team competition, and there were eleven different goalscorers. Goalkeeper Dan Tremelling was ever-present over the 43-match season; among outfield players, half-back Percy Barton appeared in 40 matches. Joe Bradford was leading scorer for the third successive year, with 24 goals, all of which came in the league.

Billy Beer, who as a player made 250 appearances for the club in the 1900s, succeeded Frank Richards as secretary-manager before the start of this season.

== Football League First Division ==
Date	League position	Opponents	Venue	Result	Score F–A	Scorers	Attendance
25 August 1923	1st	Aston Villa	H	W	3–0	Bradford 2, Lane	41,306
29 August 1923	11th	Liverpool	A	L	2–6	Bradford 2	15,000
1 September 1923	13th	Aston Villa	A	D	0–0		59,157
5 September 1923	7th	Liverpool	H	W	2–1	Bradford, Lane	30,000
8 September 1923	13th	Sunderland	H	L	0–2		40,000
10 September 1923	14th	Bolton Wanderers	H	L	0–3		15,000
15 September 1923	15th	Sunderland	A	D	1–1	Rawson	28,000
22 September 1923	19th	Arsenal	H	L	0–2		20,000
29 September 1923	18th	Arsenal	A	D	0–0		35,000
6 October 1923	17th	Blackburn Rovers	H	D	1–1	Bradford	24,000
13 October 1923	18th	Blackburn Rovers	A	L	1–4	Bradford	20,000
20 October 1923	19th	Huddersfield Town	H	L	0–1		20,000
27 October 1923	20th	Huddersfield Town	A	L	0–1		10,000
3 November 1923	20th	West Ham United	A	L	1–4	Bradford	20,000
10 November 1923	19th	West Ham United	H	W	2–0	Bradford, Islip	30,000
17 November 1923	19th	Notts County	H	D	0–0		15,000
24 November 1923	19th	Notts County	A	D	1–1	Bradford	14,000
1 December 1923	20th	Everton	A	L	0–2		18,000
8 December 1923	20th	Everton	H	L	0–1		15,000
15 December 1923	19th	West Bromwich Albion	A	D	0–0		24,785
22 December 1923	20th	West Bromwich Albion	H	D	0–0		14,000
26 December 1923	19th	Manchester City	H	W	3–0	Lane, Bradford, Harvey	35,000
29 December 1923	19th	Tottenham Hotspur	A	D	1–1	Bradford pen	25,000
1 January 1924	19th	Bolton Wanderers	A	D	1–1	Cringan	35,000
5 January 1924	18th	Tottenham Hotspur	H	W	3–2	Bradford, Cringan, Lane	25,000
19 January 1924	19th	Nottingham Forest	H	L	0–2		15,000
26 January 1924	18th	Nottingham Forest	A	D	1–1	Islip	12,000
9 February 1924	17th	Burnley	A	W	2–1	Cringan, Bradford	10,000
16 February 1924	16th	Middlesbrough	H	W	2–1	Bradford 2	20,000
23 February 1924	14th	Middlesbrough	A	W	1–0	Islip	15,000
27 February 1924	13th	Burnley	H	W	2–1	Bradford 2	14,000
1 March 1924	11th	Preston North End	H	W	2–0	Bradford 2	20,000
8 March 1924	13th	Preston North End	A	L	0–1		17,000
15 March 1924	13th	Chelsea	A	D	1–1	Ashurst	30,000
22 March 1924	11th	Chelsea	H	W	1–0	Briggs	25,000
5 April 1924	12th	Newcastle United	H	W	4–1	Linley, Bradford 2, Crosbie	20,000
9 April 1924	12th	Newcastle United	A	L	1–2	Bradford	8,000
12 April 1924	11th	Sheffield United	A	W	2–0	Bradford, Linley	8,000
18 April 1924	12th	Manchester City	A	L	0–1		30,000
19 April 1924	12th	Sheffield United	H	L	0–1		15,000
26 April 1924	14th	Cardiff City	A	L	0–2		15,000
3 May 1924	14th	Cardiff City	H	D	0–0		33,146

=== League table (part) ===
Final First Division table (part)
Pos	Club	Pld	W	D	L	F	A	GA	Pts
12th	Liverpool	42	15	11	16	49	48	1.02	41
13th	West Ham United	42	13	15	14	40	43	0.93	41
14th	Birmingham	42	13	13	16	41	49	0.84	39
15th	Tottenham Hotspur	42	12	14	16	50	56	0.89	38
16th	West Bromwich Albion	42	12	14	16	51	62	0.82	38
Key	Pos = League position; Pld = Matches played; W = Matches won; D = Matches drawn; L = Matches lost; F = Goals for; A = Goals against; GA = Goal average; Pts = Points								
Source									

== FA Cup ==
Round	Date	Opponents	Venue	Result	Score F–A	Scorers	Attendance
First round	12 January 1924	Huddersfield Town	A	L	0–1		30,924

== Appearances and goals ==
This table includes appearances and goals in nationally organised competitive matches – the Football League and FA Cup – only.
For a description of the playing positions, see Formation (association football)#2–3–5 (Pyramid).
Players marked † left the club during the playing season.

Players' appearances and goals by competition
Name	Position	League		FA Cup		Total	
Name	Position	Apps	Goals	Apps	Goals	Apps	Goals
Dan Tremelling	Goalkeeper	42	0	1	0	43	0
Eli Ashurst	Full back	31	1	1	0	32	1
David Dixon	Full back	1	0	0	0	1	0
Jack Jones	Full back	22	0	0	0	22	0
Frank Womack	Full back	31	0	1	0	32	0
Percy Barton	Half back	39	0	1	0	40	1
Jimmy Cringan	Half back	31	3	1	0	32	3
Dickie Dale	Half back	34	0	1	0	35	0
Jimmy Daws †	Half back	8	0	0	0	8	0
Bill Hunter	Half back	1	0	0	0	1	0
George Liddell	Half back	6	0	0	0	6	0
Alec McClure †	Half back	9	0	0	0	9	0
Joe Bradford	Forward	37	24	1	0	38	24
George Briggs	Forward	3	1	0	0	3	1
Wally Clark	Forward	25	0	0	0	25	0
Johnny Crosbie	Forward	31	1	0	0	31	1
Wally Harris	Forward	1	0	0	0	1	0
Bill Harvey	Forward	35	1	1	0	36	1
Fred Hoyland	Forward	6	0	0	0	6	0
Ernie Islip	Forward	27	3	1	0	28	3
Moses Lane	Forward	13	4	1	0	14	4
Ted Linley	Forward	18	2	1	0	19	2
Arthur Phoenix	Forward	3	0	0	0	3	0
Albert Rawson	Forward	6	1	0	0	6	1
Jack Russell	Forward	2	0	0	0	2	0

== See also ==
- Birmingham City F.C. seasons
