= Second City derby =

Local derby between two major clubs in Birmingham, England

Second City Derby
- Other names: Birmingham derby
- Location: Birmingham, England
- Teams: Aston Villa; Birmingham City
- First meeting: 27 September 1879; Friendly; Small Heath 1–0 Aston Villa
- Latest meeting: 10 March 2019; EFL Championship; Birmingham City 0–1 Aston Villa
- Stadiums: Villa Park (Aston Villa); St Andrew's (Birmingham City)

Statistics
- Total meetings: 126
- Most wins: Aston Villa (57)
- Top scorer: Billy Walker (11)
- All-time series: Aston Villa: 57; Drawn: 31; Birmingham City: 38
- Largest victory: Aston Villa 6–0 Birmingham (1988)
- Longest win streak: 6 games Aston Villa (1987–1993) (2005–2010)
- Longest unbeaten streak: 13 games Aston Villa (1887–1905)
- Current unbeaten streak: 8 games Aston Villa (2011–present)

In English football, the Second City derby or Birmingham derby is the local derby between the two major clubs in the city of Birmingham—Aston Villa and Birmingham City—first contested in 1879. Villa play at Villa Park while Birmingham play at St Andrew's, the two grounds separated by roughly 2.4 miles (3.9 km). It is known as the Second City Derby based on Birmingham being referred to as the second city of the United Kingdom. The two clubs are generally regarded as each other's most fierce rivals. In addition both sides have affiliated women's sides, Aston Villa and Birmingham City. The teams have not met since Villa's promotion to the Premier League in 2019.

== History ==
All-Time League positions of Aston Villa and Birmingham City within the Football League

The clubs first met on 27 September 1879, when Birmingham City were called Small Heath Alliance. The game, on a pitch at Small Heath's Muntz Street ground described by the Villa players as "only suitable for pot-holing", finished 1–0 – recorded as "one goal and a disputed goal to nil" – to the home side. Villa won the first competitive game between the clubs, in the Second Round of the FA Cup at Wellington Road in 1887, by four goals to nil,

The last pre-league FA Cup campaign saw the first competitive "Second City derby" occur on 5 November 1887. Villa beat Small Heath 4–0 in the fifth round. Tommy Green scored a brace before half-time with Albert Brown and Albert Allen adding to the score in the second half. This was their first meeting with modern rivals Birmingham City.

The first league encounter, in the First Division in the 1894–95 season, saw Villa win 2–1. after Birmingham had been promoted to the first division for a two year stint.

Small Heath F.C. took part in the 1900–01 FA Cup, losing in the third round to First division Aston Villa after a replay, Villa's Billy Garraty being the sole scorer over the two fixtures. That season Small Heath finished runners-up in Second Division, so were promoted to the First Division for 1901–02. Villa won 2–0 at Coventry Road Muntz Street with goals by Jack Devey and Joe Bache. In the 1901 Boxing Day fixture, Villa's Jasper McLuckie was the only scorer. At the end of the season Birmingham were relegated back to the Second Division.

Birmingham were promoted to the First Division in 1903–04 and Second City derbies were played up to 1907–08 when they were relegated. The teams would not meet again in top flight competition until fifteen years later when Birmingham were again promoted to the first division for 1921–22. The derbies continued until Aston Villa were relegated in 1935–36. The two teams have engaged in several hotly contested matches. In the 1925 league game at Villa Park, with the home side 3–0 ahead with eleven minutes to go, Blues scored three times in a dramatic final spell to draw the match. The following year, Aston Villa made headlines with the signing of Tom 'Pongo' Waring, and his first appearance was for the reserves against Birmingham City's reserves, which famously drew a crowd of 23,000. Waring scored three times in the match.

Villa were promoted for the 1938–39 season. Both teams won their home games. Following Birmingham's relegation there would be no further derbies until their promotion for the 1948–49 season.

The most significant clash was the final of the 1963 League Cup, which was staged not long after Aston Villa had beaten Birmingham City 4–0 in the league. Blues won 3–1 on aggregate over the two-legged final to claim their first major domestic honour.

During the late 1970s to early 1980s both Villa and Blues met regularly in the First Division and both teams had some memorable successes in the fixture. In 1980–81 Villa did the double over Blues and went on to win the First Division title. Blues scored a memorable 3–0 victory at St Andrew's in the first meeting following Villa's European Cup triumph in 1982. Both teams promptly went into decline. Blues racked up a 3–0 win in a relegation battle at Villa Park in March 1986 but were relegated at the end of that season. Villa would be demoted the following campaign. The next time Villa met Blues in a league fixture at Villa Park again was in the Second Division and saw a 2–0 Blues victory. The reverse fixture at St Andrew's was a 2–1 Villa victory with both goals coming from Garry Thompson. The two sides would only meet again in the 1980s in cup competitions. Villa won 7–0 on aggregate when they clashed twice in the 1988–89 League Cup. The same season Villa also won a Full Members Cup clash 6–0.

=== The Premier League Era ===
Following the creation of the Premier League, Aston Villa and Birmingham City met twice in the second round of the 1993–94 League Cup. Villa won both matches 1–0. The game at St Andrew's was settled by a Kevin Richardson goal after his keeper Mark Bosnich had saved a penalty from John Frain to keep the game at 0–0. The second leg at Villa Park was notable for a winning goal from Villa's Dean Saunders and a red card for Blues' Paul Tait. Villa went on to win the trophy.

Blues' promotion to the Premier League in 2002 saw fans eagerly anticipating the first league derbies in 15 years. Blues won both derbies 3–0 and 2–0, respectively. Both matches saw goalkeeping errors by Villa goalkeeper Peter Enckelman, including a goal scored directly from an Olof Mellberg throw-in; Blues supporters would later sarcastically name Enckelman runner-up in their player of the year vote. Violence between both sets of fans occurred before both matches as evening kick-off times had allowed fans to get drunk over the course of the day. In March 2003, during the game at Villa Park, two Villa players were sent off, Dion Dublin for a head-butt on Blues' Robbie Savage and Joey Guðjónsson for a reckless two-footed tackle on Matthew Upson. Trouble also took place following the game on Witton Lane outside Villa Park, where missiles were hurled at police who were attempting to keep both sets of fans apart.

The 2003–04 Premiership season saw games ending in 0–0 and 2–2 draws. The 2–2 draw saw Blues recover a two-goal deficit thanks to a 90th-minute equaliser from Stern John. Both games were lunchtime kick-offs to avoid drunken behaviour, which was achieved although the games lost none of their passionate edge. The following season Blues got back to winning ways, with 2–1 victory at Villa Park just before Christmas and 2–0 at home in March, Villa keeper Thomas Sørensen making mistakes in both matches, though it's debatable if his errors directly affected the respective results. In the 2005–06 Premiership Season, Villa finally beat Blues in the Premiership, thanks to a Kevin Phillips goal. This was followed up by another Villa victory on 16 April 2006, Easter Sunday, with Aston Villa winning 3–1 thanks to two goals from Milan Baroš and a bicycle kick from Gary Cahill. Blues were relegated in 2006 but subsequently promoted in 2007.

In November 2007, Villa won their third consecutive derby match with a 2–1 victory at St Andrew's. Former Villa defender Liam Ridgewell scored an own goal to put Villa 1–0 up, Blues equalised through Mikael Forssell only for Gabriel Agbonlahor to clinch it with a late header for Villa, having cleared off his own line seconds before. Violent clashes took place outside the ground after the game in which over 20 police officers were hurt. The derby on 20 April 2008 between the two sides ended in a 5–1 win for Aston Villa at Villa Park, the biggest winning margin for either side in a league match for 40 years.

Villa continued their winning ways in the derby, when they won both of the meetings between the clubs in the 2009–10 Premier League season. The first took place on 13 September 2009 at St Andrew's, and ended 1–0 to Aston Villa, with Agbonlahor scoring the winner in the 85th minute, once again there was trouble with 14 arrests. Villa then went on to beat Blues 1–0 at Villa Park thanks to a disputed penalty from James Milner in the 82nd minute. This was the 3rd time in 4 derbies that Villa had scored the winning goal in the final 10 minutes of the game. Villa also possess the record of six straight wins from 1987 to 1993, including five cup matches. This record was then achieved in the Premier League after Villa beat Blues 1–0 on 25 April 2010, setting a record of six straight league wins from 2005 to 2010. The record was finally ended at the next derby match on 31 October 2010, which resulted in a 0–0 draw at Villa Park. The return match at St Andrew's also ended in a draw, with it finishing 1–1.

In those games in October and December 2010 where Aston Villa played Birmingham City, at Villa Park (Premier League, 31 October) and St Andrew's (League Cup, 1 December, which was the first mid-week game between the two sides since 2003) violence between the two sets of supporters and hooligan firms occurred, with many fans being arrested. In the first game, there were scenes of violence outside Villa Park and there were a small amount of arrests including a Birmingham City club chef. In the second of the two games (and larger scale violence) after Blues had beaten Villa 2–1, Blues supporters came onto the pitch and confronted the visiting Villa fans, this resulted in flares, ripped out seats and other missiles being hurled by Villa fans into the Blues supporters, there were also flash points before and after the game including the attack on a Blues supporters pub by Villa hooligans, the events were described as a "warzone" by a supporter who attended the game. Birmingham City were later fined £40,000 by the Football Association for failing to control their fans.

On 10 April 2011, an episode of Police Academy UK, a TV show aired on BBC Three which documents overseas police officers' introduction to British crime and policing, was set in Birmingham and covered the violence that occurred at the game between Birmingham City and Aston Villa on 1 December 2010.

On 17 June 2011, Birmingham City manager Alex McLeish swapped Blues for Villa in a move that shocked the football world. The reaction from both sets of supporters was one of anger. Blues supporters were angry at McLeish, who guided them to only their second ever major trophy win in February 2011, for betraying them to join bitter rivals Villa, and Villa fans were unhappy with the appointment of a manager that had got Blues relegated twice in four seasons, and was perceived to play a negative style of football; that he came from Blues only served to rub salt into the wound of the board making such an unambitious and negative appointment. Several hundred Villa supporters protested at Villa Park when it emerged that Villa owner Randy Lerner has begun talks with McLeish. McLeish received death threats from followers of both teams following his appointment as Aston Villa manager. This controversial move only increased tension and hostility between the players, supporters and owners of both clubs even more as Blues directors threatened legal action against Villa for allegedly "tapping up" McLeish, who resigned as Blues manager on 12 June 2011, while he was still under contract at Birmingham City. McLeish's appointment marked the first time in history that a manager had moved directly from Birmingham City to Aston Villa. On 14 May 2012, one day after the 2011–12 Premier League season ended, McLeish was sacked as Villa manager after a massively disappointing one season in charge.

=== The EFL Championship Era ===
After being relegated in 2011, Birmingham are still yet to gain promotion back to the top flight of English football. However, since Alex McLeish was sacked as Villa manager, Villa's poor form continued. Despite several manager changes over the next few years, after several close calls they were finally relegated at the end of the 2015/16 season. Earlier on in the 2015/16 season, the two teams were drawn to play each other in the third round of the League Cup. Aston Villa ran out 1–0 winners thanks to a goal from Rudy Gestede. In the 2016–17 season the two teams faced off in the second tier of English football for the first time since 1987. The first game at St Andrew's ended in a 1–1 draw. Villa won the second match 1–0 with a 69th-minute goal scored by Agbonlahor. The two sides faced each other again in the league during the 2017/18 season, producing a 0–0 draw at St. Andrews, marred by Birmingham fans throwing clappers at the Villa players all throughout the game, before Villa achieved a 2–0 victory in front of 41,232 spectators at Villa Park with lifelong Villa fan and local Jack Grealish, who produced a match-winning man-of-the-match display. The teams next met on 25 November 2018 in one of the most exciting derby games in recent times, Villa ran out 4–2 winners after goals from Jonathan Kodjia, Jack Grealish, a Tammy Abraham penalty and Alan Hutton who ran half the length of the pitch to score, Pedersen and Lukas Jutkiewicz scored for Birmingham.

On 10 March 2019, a Birmingham City fan invaded the pitch during the return fixture at St. Andrew's and assaulted Aston Villa captain Jack Grealish on the pitch by punching him from behind in the head, which was labelled as "disgraceful and cowardly" by supporters of both teams. The man was arrested and charged by West Midlands Police. Later that month, the attacker, 27-year-old Paul Mitchell, was convicted of assault and encroachment onto a football pitch at Birmingham Magistrates Court and jailed for 14 weeks, receiving £350 of fines and a 10-year ban from all football stadiums. Mitchell died in 2023 of a drug overdose. St Andrew's' security was criticised as a result. The game ended in an ironic twist with a 1–0 win for Aston Villa with Grealish scoring the winning goal. At the end of the same season, Villa were promoted as they won ten in a row including that game. Since then, this fiercely contested fixture hasn't been played between the two rivals.

=== Women's Sides ===
Birmingham City W.F.C. were founded in 1968, whilst Aston Villa W.F.C. were founded in 1973 as Solihull F.C., and took on their current Aston Villa guise in 1996. During the 2000-01 and 2001-02 seasons both teams competed in the second tier FA Women's Premier League North. Birmingham were then promoted to the Women's Premier League National with Villa joining them for one season in 2003-04 before being relegated. Then followed 18 years of the teams being in different divisions, Birmingham being in the top tier and Villa elsewhere, until the 2020–21 Women's Super League season when Villa were promoted up to join Blues. In the first ever WSL match between the two sides Birmingham beat Villa 1–0 at an empty Villa Park (due to restrictions related to the COVID-19 pandemic in the United Kingdom), while the Birmingham's home match which was also played behind closed doors at Damson Park, Solihull was a 1–1 draw. In the 2021–22 season, Aston Villa won 1–0 at St. Andrew's. Birmingham returned the favour and won 1–0 at Villa Park on 8 May 2022, the final day of the season, as they were relegated to the FA Women's Championship. In the 2025–26 season, Aston Villa and Birmingham City were drawn in the same group in the Women's League Cup - the tie finished as a 3–3 draw at the Bescot Stadium, with Birmingham City winning the penalty shootout 4–2 to gain the bonus point.

In the 2026–27 stadium, Birmingham City had earned promotion and both teams were once again in the WSL. However, the first derby meeting of the season was in the 2026–27 WSL Players Cup group stage, where the match finished as a 1–1 draw at Keys Park, with Aston Villa winning the penalty shootout 6–5 to gain the bonus point. On 15 November 2026, the two teams met in the WSL at Villa Park, Aston Villa won 1–0 with a Mathilde Harviken header being the difference between the sides - the first time the home team had won the tie in the WSL.

As of the 2026–27 season, Birmingham currently play at St Andrew's, home of the men's team, having played at Redditch Utd, Stratford Town and Solihull Moors in the 21st century. Villa play at Villa Park in the league, with cup matches making place at Hednesford Town's Keys Park, having previously played at Boldmere St Michaels and Walsall's Bescot Stadium.

== Statistics and records ==
As of the end of the 2018–19 season, there have been 126 meetings in major competition between the two teams since the first FA Cup meeting in 1887, of which Aston Villa have won 57 and Birmingham City 38. The most goals in one game were scored in a league game on 7 July 1895, in the First Division, as Small Heath lost to Aston Villa 7–3. The biggest winning margin was 6–0 to Aston Villa on 9 November 1988, in a Full Members Cup fixture. The last Birmingham City league victory over Aston Villa was on 20 March 2005, when Blues won 2–0 at St Andrew's. Villa won six encounters in a row following this and have remained unbeaten in 14 league encounters. The two teams drew for the first time in over six years in the next match (the first of three in the 2010–11 season), with the match finishing 0–0 (the other Premier League match of the season also finished as a draw). The second match of the season resulted in the first Blues derby win since 2005, as they beat Villa 2–1 in the 2010–11 League Cup Quarter Final on 1 December 2010.

=== Aston Villa in the league at home ===
Date	Venue	Score	Competition	Attendance
1 September 1894	Wellington Road	2–1	First Division	20,000
7 September 1895	Wellington Road	7–3	First Division	13,000
26 December 1901	Villa Park	1–0	First Division	40,000
16 January 1904	Villa Park	1–1	First Division	20,000
29 October 1904	Villa Park	2–1	First Division	40,000
20 January 1906	Villa Park	1–3	First Division	40,000
15 September 1906	Villa Park	4–1	First Division	45,000
18 January 1908	Villa Park	2–3	First Division	39,500
11 March 1922	Villa Park	1–1	First Division	52,345
24 March 1923	Villa Park	3–0	First Division	40,000
1 September 1923	Villa Park	0–0	First Division	59,157
14 February 1925	Villa Park	1–0	First Division	60,000
17 October 1925	Villa Park	3–3	First Division	52,254
19 March 1927	Villa Park	2–4	First Division	49,334
17 March 1928	Villa Park	1–1	First Division	59,367
9 March 1929	Villa Park	1–2	First Division	56,528
31 August 1929	Villa Park	2–1	First Division	36,834
18 October 1930	Villa Park	1–1	First Division	55,482
21 November 1931	Villa Park	3–2	First Division	44,948
22 October 1932	Villa Park	1–0	First Division	52,191
14 April 1934	Villa Park	1–1	First Division	34,196
29 December 1934	Villa Park	2–2	First Division	40,785
28 March 1936	Villa Park	2–1	First Division	49,531
4 March 1939	Villa Park	5–1	First Division	40,874
4 December 1948	Villa Park	0–3	First Division	62,434
10 December 1949	Villa Park	1–1	First Division	45,008
5 September 1955	Villa Park	0–0	First Division	57,690
27 October 1956	Villa Park	3–1	First Division	54,927
21 December 1957	Villa Park	0–2	First Division	41,118
23 August 1958	Villa Park	1–1	First Division	55,198
22 October 1960	Villa Park	6–2	First Division	44,722
28 October 1961	Villa Park	1–3	First Division	49,532
16 March 1963	Villa Park	4–0	First Division	40,400
13 February 1964	Villa Park	0–3	First Division	25,797
12 April 1965	Villa Park	3–0	First Division	36,871
7 October 1967	Villa Park	2–4	Second Division	50,067
12 April 1969	Villa Park	1–0	Second Division	53,647
18 October 1969	Villa Park	0–0	Second Division	54,405
27 September 1975	Villa Park	2–1	First Division	53,782
18 September 1976	Villa Park	1–2	First Division	50,084
1 October 1977	Villa Park	0–1	First Division	45,436
3 March 1979	Villa Park	1–0	First Division	42,419
13 December 1980	Villa Park	3–0	First Division	41,101
26 September 1981	Villa Park	0–0	First Division	41,098
4 April 1983	Villa Park	1–0	First Division	40,897
15 October 1983	Villa Park	1–0	First Division	39,318
22 March 1986	Villa Park	0–3	First Division	26,294
22 August 1987	Villa Park	0–2	Second Division	30,870
3 March 2003	Villa Park	0–2	Premiership	42,606
22 February 2004	Villa Park	2–2	Premiership	40,061
12 December 2004	Villa Park	1–2	Premiership	42,606
16 April 2006	Villa Park	3–1	Premier League	40,158
20 April 2008	Villa Park	5–1	Premier League	42,584
25 April 2010	Villa Park	1–0	Premier League	42,584
31 October 2010	Villa Park	0–0	Premier League	40,688
23 April 2017	Villa Park	1–0	Championship	40,884
11 February 2018	Villa Park	2–0	Championship	41,232
25 November 2018	Villa Park	4–2	Championship	41,200

=== Birmingham City in the league at home ===
Date	Venue	Score	Competition	Attendance
20 October 1894	Muntz Street	2–2	First Division	14,000
26 October 1895	Muntz Street	1–4	First Division	10,000
12 October 1901	Muntz Street	0–2	First Division	23,000
19 September 1903	Muntz Street	2–2	First Division	25,000
25 February 1905	Muntz Street	0–3	First Division	28,000
16 September 1905	Muntz Street	2–0	First Division	30,000
19 January 1907	St Andrew's	3–2	First Division	60,000
21 September 1907	St Andrew's	2–3	First Division	45,000
15 March 1922	St Andrew's	1–0	First Division	34,190
17 March 1923	St Andrew's	1–0	First Division	50,000
15 August 1923	St Andrew's	3–0	First Division	41,306
11 October 1924	St Andrew's	1–0	First Division	48,098
27 February 1926	St Andrew's	2–1	First Division	38,231
30 October 1926	St Andrew's	1–2	First Division	48,104
5 November 1927	St Andrew's	1–1	First Division	47,605
27 October 1928	St Andrew's	2–4	First Division	36,261
28 December 1929	St Andrew's	1–1	First Division	33,228
21 February 1931	St Andrew's	0–4	First Division	49,619
2 April 1932	St Andrew's	1–1	First Division	35,671
8 March 1933	St Andrew's	3–2	First Division	24,868
2 December 1933	St Andrew's	0–0	First Division	34,718
25 August 1934	St Andrew's	2–1	First Division	53,930
23 November 1935	St Andrew's	2–2	First Division	60,250
29 October 1938	St Andrew's	3–0	First Division	55,301
30 April 1949	St Andrew's	0–1	First Division	45,120
29 April 1950	St Andrew's	2–2	First Division	24,866
21 September 1955	St Andrew's	2–2	First Division	32,642
10 April 1957	St Andrew's	1–2	First Division	29,853
24 August 1957	St Andrew's	3–1	First Division	50,780
20 December 1958	St Andrew's	4–1	First Division	31,857
11 March 1961	St Andrew's	1–1	First Division	41,656
17 March 1962	St Andrew's	0–2	First Division	43,489
27 October 1962	St Andrew's	3–2	First Division	42,228
31 March 1964	St Andrew's	3–3	First Division	28,069
13 February 1965	St Andrew's	0–1	First Division	32,491
24 February 1968	St Andrew's	2–1	Second Division	45,283
21 September 1968	St Andrew's	4–0	Second Division	40,527
30 March 1970	St Andrew's	0–2	Second Division	41,696
3 April 1976	St Andrew's	3–2	First Division	46,251
10 May 1977	St Andrew's	2–1	First Division	43,721
25 February 1978	St Andrew's	1–0	First Division	33,679
3 March 1979	St Andrew's	0–1	First Division	36,145
11 October 1980	St Andrew's	1–2	First Division	33,879
20 February 1982	St Andrew's	0–1	First Division	32,817
27 December 1982	St Andrew's	3–0	First Division	43,864
31 March 1983	St Andrew's	2–1	First Division	23,993
7 September 1985	St Andrew's	0–0	First Division	24,971
12 December 1987	St Andrew's	1–2	Second Division	27,789
16 September 2002	St Andrew's	3–0	Premiership	29,505
19 October 2003	St Andrew's	0–0	Premiership	29,546
20 March 2005	St Andrew's	2–0	Premiership	29,382
16 October 2005	St Andrew's	0–1	Premier League	29,312
11 November 2007	St Andrew's	1–2	Premier League	26,539
13 September 2009	St Andrew's	0–1	Premier League	25,196
16 January 2011	St Andrew's	1–1	Premier League	22,287
30 October 2016	St Andrew's	1–1	Championship	29,656
29 October 2017	St Andrew's	0–0	Championship	24,408
10 March 2019	St Andrew's	0–1	Championship	26,631

=== Cup matches ===
Date	Venue	Home team	Score	Competition	Round	Attendance
5 November 1887	Wellington Road	Aston Villa	4–0	FA Cup	2nd Round	
23 March 1901	Muntz Street	Small Heath	0–0	FA Cup	Quarter Final	
27 March 1901	Villa Park	Aston Villa	1–0	FA Cup	Quarter Final replay	
23 May 1963	St Andrew's	Birmingham City	3–1	League Cup	Final 1st leg	31,850
27 May 1963	Villa Park	Aston Villa	0–0	League Cup	Final 2nd leg	37,921
27 September 1988	St Andrew's	Birmingham City	0–2	League Cup	2nd Round 1st leg	
12 October 1988	Villa Park	Aston Villa	5–0	League Cup	2nd Round 2nd leg	
9 November 1988	Villa Park	Aston Villa	6–0	Full Members Cup	1st Round	8,324
21 September 1993	St Andrew's	Birmingham City	0–1	League Cup	2nd Round 1st leg	27,815
6 October 1993	Villa Park	Aston Villa	1–0	League Cup	2nd Round 2nd leg	35,856
1 December 2010	St Andrew's	Birmingham City	2–1	League Cup	Quarter Final	27,679
22 September 2015	Villa Park	Aston Villa	1–0	League Cup	3rd Round	34,442

=== Women's matches ===
Date	Venue	Home team	Score	Competition	Attendance
17 September 2000	Trevor Brown Memorial Ground	Aston Villa	2–2	2000-01 FA Women's Premier League	
4 January 2001	Trico Stadium	Birmingham City	1–2	2000-01 FA Women's Premier League	
14 October 2001	Trico Stadium	Birmingham City	4–1	2001-02 FA Women's Premier League	
29 March 2002	Trevor Brown Memorial Ground	Aston Villa	0–3	2001-02 FA Women's Premier League	
17 September 2003	Trevor Brown Memorial Ground	Aston Villa	0–1	2003-04 FA Women's Premier League	
15 October 2003	St Andrew's	Birmingham City	1–1	2003-04 FA Women's Premier League	
13 May 2014	Trevor Brown Memorial Ground	Aston Villa	0–2	2014 WSL Cup	
30 July 2015	Trevor Brown Memorial Ground	Aston Villa	1–7	2015 WSL Cup	
26 August 2018	Knights Lane	Birmingham City	2–0	2018–19 FA Women's League Cup	
14 November 2020	Villa Park	Aston Villa	0–1	2020–21 FA WSL	0
28 April 2021	Damson Park	Birmingham City	1–1	2020–21 FA WSL	0
14 November 2021	St Andrew's	Birmingham City	0–1	2021–22 FA WSL	1,386
8 May 2022	Villa Park	Aston Villa	0–1	2021–22 FA WSL	8,367
21 November 2025	Bescot Stadium	Aston Villa	3–3	2025–26 Women's League Cup	1,513
28 October 2026	Keys Park	Aston Villa	1–1	2026–27 WSL Players Cup	1,548
15 November 2026	Villa Park	Aston Villa	1–0	2026–27 Women's Super League	5,672

== Results ==
Stats correct as of 15 November 2026.

Total
	AVFC Wins	Draws	BCFC Wins	AVFC Goals	BCFC Goals
League (1st Tier)	42	26	32	158	136
League (2nd Tier)	7	3	4	18	17
League (Total)	49	29	36	176	153
FA Cup	2	1	0	6	0
League Cup	5	1	2	12	5
Full Members Cup	1	0	0	6	0
All competitive games	57	31	38	200	158

Aston Villa at home
	AVFC Wins	Draws	BCFC Wins	AVFC Goals	BCFC Goals
League (1st Tier)	25	13	12	91	62
League (2nd Tier)	4	1	2	10	8
League (Total)	29	14	14	101	70
FA Cup	2	0	0	5	0
League Cup	3	1	0	7	0

Birmingham City at home
	BCFC Wins	Draws	AVFC Wins	BCFC Goals	AVFC Goals
League (1st Tier)	20	13	16	74	66
League (2nd Tier)	2	3	3	9	8
League (Total)	22	16	19	83	74
FA Cup	0	1	0	0	0
League Cup	2	0	2	5	5

Women's Total
	AVFC Wins	Draws	BCFC Wins	AVFC Goals	BCFC Goals
League (1st Tier)	3	3	5	9	15
FA Cup	0	0	0	0	0
League Cup	0	2	3	5	15
All competitive games	3	5	8	14	30

=== Records ===
==== Firsts ====
- First competitive meeting: Aston Villa 4–0 Small Heath Alliance (FA Cup), 5 November 1887.
- First league meeting: Aston Villa 2–1 Small Heath, 1 September 1894.
- First away victory for Aston Villa: Small Heath 1–4 Aston Villa, 26 October 1895.
- First away victory for Birmingham City: Aston Villa 1–3 Birmingham, 20 January 1906.

==== Results ====
- Highest scoring game: Aston Villa 7–3 Small Heath, 7 September 1895.
- Largest winning margin (Aston Villa): 6 goals – 6–0, 9 November 1988.
- Largest winning margin (Birmingham City): 4 goals – 4–0, 21 September 1968.

==== Players ====
- Most goals in a match (Aston Villa):
- Most goals in a match (Birmingham City):

==== Trends ====
- Most games won in a row (Aston Villa): 6, 16 October 2005 to 25 April 2010.
- Most games won in a row (Birmingham City): 5, 3 April 1976 – 25 February 1978.
- Most games without defeat (Aston Villa): 13, 1 September 1894 – 20 January 1906.
- Most games without defeat (Birmingham City): 6, 8 March 1933 – 23 November 1935 and 16 September 2002 – 20 March 2005.
- Most drawn games in a row: 4, 10 December 1949 – 21 September 1955.
- Whenever the clubs have met in the Premier League the result has always been the same during that particular season: 2002/2003– 2 Blues wins, 2003/2004– 2 draws, 2004/2005– 2 Blues wins, 2005/2006– 2 Villa Wins, 2007/2008– 2 Villa wins, 2009/2010– 2 Villa wins, 2010/11- 2 draws.

== Top scorers ==
The following is a list of the top goal scorers for each team in the fixture. Only players who have scored 4 or more goals feature.

=== Aston Villa ===
Player	Goals
(England) Billy Walker	11
(England) Tom Waring	7
(Scotland) John Campbell	5
(England) John Devey	5
(England) Gabriel Agbonlahor	5
(England) Eric Houghton	4
(England) Gerry Hitchens	4
(Scotland) Andy Gray	4

=== Birmingham City ===
Player	Goals
(England) Joe Bradford	8
(Scotland) Johnny Crosbie	5
(Wales) Ken Leek	5
(England) Barry Bridges	4
(England) George Briggs	4
(England) Trevor Francis	4
(England) Arthur Mounteney	4

== Crossing the divide ==
=== Players ===
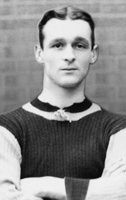
Harry Hampton transferred from Villa to Blues in 1920.

Unlike, for example, the Old Firm derby, there is no shortage of players who have appeared for both clubs. Villa legend Harry Hampton transferred to Blues after the First World War and helped the club to the Second Division title. The last established first-team player to make this move was Des Bremner in 1984, though there had been loan signings and movement of youth players during this period. The most recent permanent transfer from Aston Villa to Birmingham City was that of Ireland international Scott Hogan, who moved for an undisclosed fee in September 2020. The last player to move directly in the other direction was Spanish winger Jota in the summer of 2019.

Notable players who have been transferred directly between the clubs are listed below.

==== Aston Villa to Birmingham City ====
Name	Pos	Aston Villa			Birmingham City		
Name	Pos	Career	Apps	Goals	Career	Apps	Goals
Charlie Athersmith	Winger	1891–1901	269	75	1901–1905	100	12
Walter Corbett	Full back	−1907			1907–1911	48	0
Frederick Chapple	Inside forward	1906–1908	9	3	1908–1910	51	15
Harry Hampton	Forward	1904–1920	341	215	1920–1922	57	31
Stan Lynn	Right back	1950–1961	281	36	1961–1966	131	26
Bobby Thomson	Forward	1959–1963	140	56	1963–1967	114	23
Ron Wylie	Inside forward	1958–1965	196	16	1965–1970	128	2
John Sleeuwenhoek	Centre half	1961–1967	226	1	1967–1971	30	0
Noel Blake	Defender	1979–1982	4	0	1982–1984	76	5
Robert Hopkins	Winger	1979–1983	3	1	1983–1986	123	20
Des Bremner	Midfielder	1978–1984	174	9	1984–1989	168	5
Liam Ridgewell	Defender	2001–2007	79	7	2007–2012	139	9
Craig Gardner	Midfielder	2005–2010	80	6	2010–2011	42	9
Curtis Davies	Defender	2008–2011	37	2	2011–2013	89	11
Gary Gardner	Midfielder	2011–2019	33	1	2018–19 (loan), 2019–2024	40	2
Scott Hogan	Striker	2017–2020	56	7	2019–20 (loan), 2020–2024	149	35

===== Notes =====
- The players listed above made a direct transfer from Villa to Blues. In addition, there are several players who have "crossed the divide" but done so via another league club.
- European Cup winner Dennis Mortimer – regarded by Villa fans as one of their greatest ever players – also played for Birmingham City in the 1986/87 season.
- Kevin Phillips played for Villa in the 2005/06 season before moving to Blues in 2008 via West Bromwich Albion.

==== Birmingham City to Aston Villa ====
Name	Pos	Birmingham City			Aston Villa		
Name	Pos	Career	Apps	Goals	Career	Apps	Goals
Geoff Vowden	Forward	1964–1971	221	79	1971–1974	97	22
Alan Curbishley	Midfielder	1979–1983	130	11	1983–1984	36	1
Chris Sutton*	Striker	2006	10	1	2006–2007	8	1
Jota	Attacking midfielder	2017–2019	72	8	2019–2020	16	1

===== Notes =====
- The players listed above made a direct transfer from Blues to Villa. In addition, there are several high-profile players who have "crossed the divide" but done so via another league club. Notable examples include former England international Emile Heskey and European Cup winner Peter Withe.
- Chris Sutton was released by Birmingham City at the end of the 2005–06 season. His next club was Aston Villa, for whom he signed for in October 2006.
- Scott Sinclair has played on loan at both clubs. He was on loan at Birmingham City while he was playing for Chelsea during the 2008–09 season and he was on loan at Aston Villa during the 2014–15 season before signing permanently from Manchester City.

=== Managers ===
Former Aston Villa Manager Ron Saunders, who managed Villa to League Cup success in 1975 and again in 1977 before taking the club to its first Championship success for 70 years in 1981, also moved across to Birmingham City following his resignation in 1982.

Alex McLeish's appointment as Aston Villa manager in June 2011 after resigning from Birmingham City five days before was the first time in history a manager has moved from Birmingham City to Aston Villa. The move shocked the football world and increased tension between the two clubs even more.

Former Birmingham City Manager Steve Bruce was appointed Villa manager in 2016.

==== Aston Villa to Birmingham City ====
Name	Aston Villa		Birmingham City	
Name	Career	Honours	Career	Honours
(England) Ron Saunders	1974–1982	1974–75 League Cup; 1976–77 League Cup; 1980–81 First Division	1982–1986	

==== Birmingham City to Aston Villa ====
Name	Birmingham City		Aston Villa	
Name	Career	Honours	Career	Honours
(Scotland) Alex McLeish	2007–2011	2010–11 League Cup	2011–2012	

=== Chairmen ===
Doug Ellis was a director of Birmingham City in the late 1960s before becoming part of a consortium which took over at Aston Villa in 1968.

== Honours ==
As of 20 May 2026

Aston Villa	Competition	Birmingham City
Domestic
7	First Division / Premier League (tier 1)	0
2	Second Division / EFL Championship (tier 2)	4
1	Third Division / EFL League One (tier 3)	2
7	FA Cup	0
5	League Cup	2
1	FA Community Shield	0
23	Aggregate	8
European and International
1	UEFA Champions League	0
1	UEFA Europa League	0
1	UEFA Super Cup	0
1	UEFA Intertoto Cup (Defuncted in 2008)	0
4	Aggregate	0
27	Overall	8

== See also ==
- Aston Villa Hardcore (hooligan firm)
- Birmingham Zulu Warriors (hooligan firm)
- List of Aston Villa F.C. seasons
- List of Birmingham City F.C. seasons
- List of Aston Villa F.C. records and statistics
- List of Birmingham City F.C. records and statistics
