= 1921–22 Birmingham F.C. season =

Birmingham F.C.
1921–22 season
- Chairman: Howard Cant
- Secretary-manager: Frank Richards
- Ground: St Andrew's
- Football League First Division: 18th
- FA Cup: Did not enter
- Top goalscorer: Johnny Crosbie, Joe Bradford (10)
- Highest home attendance: 44,505 vs West Bromwich Albion, 27 December 1921
- Lowest home attendance: 10,000 vs Liverpool, 4 February 1922
- Average home league attendance: 27,526
Home colours

The 1921–22 Football League season was Birmingham Football Club's 26th in the Football League and their 9th in the First Division, having been promoted as Second Division champions in 1920–21. They retained their First Division status, finishing in 18th position in the 22-team division.

They did not take part in the 1921–22 FA Cup. Secretary-manager Frank Richards failed to submit their entry form in time to be granted exemption from qualifying, and the Football Association refused to bend the rules in their favour. Although that decision did not preclude their entering the competition in the qualifying rounds, the directors chose not to do so.

Thirty-one players made at least one appearance in nationally organised first-team competition, and there were twelve different goalscorers. Goalkeeper Dan Tremelling played in 39 matches over the 42-match season; among outfield players, half-back Alec McClure appeared in 35. Joe Bradford and Johnny Crosbie were joint leading scorers with 10 goals.

== Football League First Division ==
Date	League position	Opponents	Venue	Result	Score F–A	Scorers	Attendance
27 August 1921	16th	Burnley	H	L	2–3	Elkes 2	40,000
29 August 1921	10th	Chelsea	A	W	2–1	Elkes, Hampton	25,000
3 September 1921	16th	Burnley	A	L	1–3	Elkes	35,000
5 September 1921	10th	Chelsea	H	W	5–1	Whitehouse 2, Elkes 2, Crosbie	30,000
10 September 1921	15th	Everton	A	L	1–2	Crosbie	30,000
17 September 1921	15th	Everton	H	D	1–1	Whitehouse	30,000
24 September 1921	17th	Sunderland	A	L	1–2	Whitehouse	30,000
1 October 1921	14th	Sunderland	H	W	1–0	Whitehouse	30,000
8 October 1921	16th	Huddersfield Town	H	L	0–2		40,113
15 October 1921	19th	Huddersfield Town	A	L	0–1		15,000
22 October 1921	19th	Bolton Wanderers	H	D	1–1	Crosbie	20,000
29 October 1921	16th	Bolton Wanderers	A	W	2–1	Bradford 2	21,567
5 November 1921	18th	Arsenal	H	L	0–1		30,000
12 November 1921	19th	Arsenal	A	L	2–5	Whitehouse, Bradford	30,000
19 November 1921	18th	Blackburn Rovers	A	D	1–1	Bradford	25,000
26 November 1921	17th	Blackburn Rovers	H	W	1–0	Burkinshaw	20,000
3 December 1921	14th	Oldham Athletic	A	W	1–0	Cameron	14,000
10 December 1921	12th	Oldham Athletic	H	W	3–0	Whitehouse, Liddell, Crosbie	30,000
17 December 1921	11th	Sheffield United	H	W	2–1	Elkes, Whitehouse	30,000
24 December 1921	10th	Sheffield United	A	W	2–1	Whitehouse, Lane	25,000
26 December 1921	11th	West Bromwich Albion	A	L	0–1		49,488
27 December 1921	11th	West Bromwich Albion	H	L	0–2		44,505
31 December 1921	14th	Cardiff City	H	L	0–1		30,000
14 January 1922	17th	Cardiff City	A	L	1–3	Crosbie	35,000
21 January 1922	19th	Newcastle United	H	L	0–4		15,000
4 February 1922	20th	Liverpool	H	L	0–2		10,000
8 February 1922	18th	Newcastle United	A	W	1–0	Harvey	22,000
11 February 1922	19th	Liverpool	A	L	0–1		30,000
18 February 1922	19th	Manchester United	H	L	0–1		20,000
25 February 1922	17th	Manchester United	A	D	1–1	Bradford	40,000
11 March 1922	19th	Aston Villa	A	D	1–1	Liddell	52,345
15 March 1922	18th	Aston Villa	H	W	1–0	Crosbie	34,190
18 March 1922	18th	Middlesbrough	A	D	1–1	Crosbie	20,000
25 March 1922	16th	Middlesbrough	H	W	4–3	Bradford 2, Crosbie, Hampton	15,000
1 April 1922	17th	Tottenham Hotspur	H	L	0–3		34,230
8 April 1922	17th	Tottenham Hotspur	A	L	1–2	Hampton	19,638
14 April 1922	19th	Manchester City	A	L	0–1		35,000
15 April 1922	17th	Bradford City	A	W	2–1	Bradford 2	25,000
18 April 1922	16th	Manchester City	H	W	3–1	McClure, Bradford, Hampton	30,000
22 April 1922	15th	Bradford City	H	W	1–0	Foxall	25,000
1 May 1922	16th	Preston North End	A	D	2–2	Crosbie 2	10,000
6 May 1922	18th	Preston North End	H	L	0–2		20,000

=== League table (part) ===
Final First Division table (part)
Pos	Club	Pld	W	D	L	F	A	GA	Pts
16th	Preston North End	42	13	12	17	42	65	0.65	38
17th	Arsenal	42	15	7	20	47	56	0.84	37
18th	Birmingham	42	15	7	20	48	60	0.80	37
19th	Oldham Athletic	42	13	11	18	38	50	0.76	37
20th	Everton	42	12	12	18	57	55	1.04	36
Key	Pos = League position; Pld = Matches played; W = Matches won; D = Matches drawn; L = Matches lost; F = Goals for; A = Goals against; GA = Goal average; Pts = Points								
Source									

== Appearances and goals ==
This table includes appearances and goals in nationally organised competitive matches – the Football League – only.
For a description of the playing positions, see Formation (association football)#2–3–5 (Pyramid).
Players marked † left the club during the playing season.

Players' appearances and goals by competition
Name	Position	League	
Name	Position	Apps	Goals
Stan Hauser	Goalkeeper	3	0
Dan Tremelling	Goalkeeper	39	0
Eli Ashurst	Full back	9	0
David Dixon	Full back	2	0
Bill Hunter	Full back	9	0
Jack Jones	Full back	33	0
Frank Womack	Full back	30	0
Percy Barton	Half back	29	0
Bobby Booth	Half back	2	0
Jimmy Daws	Half back	12	0
George Getgood †	Half back	10	0
George Liddell	Half back	20	2
Alec McClure	Half back	35	1
Joe Roulson †	Half back	15	0
Vincent White	Half back	2	0
Joe Barratt	Forward	12	0
Joe Bradford	Forward	17	10
Laurie Burkinshaw	Forward	4	1
Eddie Cameron	Forward	6	1
Johnny Crosbie	Forward	34	10
George Davies	Forward	3	0
Harry Deacon	Forward	2	0
Jack Elkes †	Forward	16	7
Fred Foxall	Forward	11	1
Harry Hampton	Forward	18	4
Bill Harvey	Forward	21	1
Joe Lane	Forward	19	1
Ted Linley	Forward	17	0
Peter Neil	Forward	5	0
Leonard Thompson	Forward	2	0
Jackie Whitehouse	Forward	25	9

== See also ==
- Birmingham City F.C. seasons
