= List of Birmingham City F.C. records and statistics =

Small Heath F.C., champions of the inaugural Football League Second Division 1892–93

Birmingham City Football Club is a professional association football club based in the city of Birmingham, England. Founded in September 1875 as Small Heath Alliance, the club turned professional in 1885 and three years later, under the name of Small Heath F.C. Ltd, was the first football club to become a limited company with a board of directors. They were later known as Birmingham before adopting their current name in 1943. Elected to the newly formed Second Division of the Football League in 1892, they have never dropped below the third tier of English football. They were also pioneers of European football competition, taking part in the inaugural season of the Inter-Cities Fairs Cup.

The list encompasses the major honours won by Birmingham City, records set by the club, their managers and their players, and details of their performance in European competition. The player records section itemises the club's leading goalscorers and those who have made most appearances in first-team competitions. It also records notable achievements by Birmingham players on the international stage, and the highest transfer fees paid and received by the club. Attendance records at St Andrew's, the club's home ground since 1906, are also included.

All figures are correct as of the end of the 2024–25 playing season.

== Honours ==
Birmingham's first ever silverware was the Walsall Cup which they won in 1883. Their first honour in national competitive football was the inaugural championship of the Football League Second Division in 1892–93. The majority of their success came in the period from the mid-1950s to the early 1960s. Promoted to the First Division in 1955, in the following season they achieved their highest league finish of sixth place and their second FA Cup final appearance. They went on to reach two successive finals of the Inter-Cities Fairs Cup, and won their only major trophy, the League Cup, for the first time in 1963, a success not repeated until 2011. In the 1994–95 season they completed the "lower-division double", of the Division Two (level 3) title and the Football League Trophy, a cup competition open to teams from the third and fourth tiers of English football; this was the first time the golden goal was used to decide the winner of a senior English cup final.

Birmingham City's honours and achievements include the following:

European competition

- Inter-Cities Fairs Cup
  - Finalists (2): 1960, 1961

The Football League

- Second Division / The Championship (level 2)
  - Champions (4): 1892–93, 1920–21, 1947–48, 1954–55
  - Runners up (7): 1893–94, 1900–01, 1902–03, 1971–72, 1984–85, 2006–07, 2008–09
  - Promotion (2): 1979–80, (Note: Promoted automatically to the Football League First Division by finishing in third place in the Second.) 2001–02 (Note: Promoted via the playoff system to the Premier League after finishing fifth in the Championship.)
- Third Division / Division Two / League One (level 3)
  - Champions (2): 1994–95, 2024–25
  - Runners up (1): 1991–92

Domestic cup competition

- FA Cup
  - Finalists (2): 1930–31, 1955–56
- League Cup
  - Winners (2): 1962–63, 2010–11
  - Finalists (1): 2000–01
- EFL Trophy and predecessors (Note: This competition, open to teams in the third and fourth tiers of English football, was renamed the EFL Trophy in 2016. It is more often referred to by its sponsored name, which in 1991 was the Leyland DAF Trophy, in 1995 was the Auto Windscreens Shield, and in 2025 was the Vertu Trophy.)
  - Winners (2): 1990–91, 1994–95
  - Finalists (1): 2024–25

Wartime competition

- Football League South
  - Champions (1): 1945–46

== Player records ==
=== Appearances ===
- Youngest first-team player: Jude Bellingham, 16 years 38 days (against Portsmouth, EFL Cup, 6 August 2019).
- Oldest first-team player: Dennis Jennings, 39 years 290 days (against Wolverhampton Wanderers, Second Division, 6 May 1950).

==== Most appearances ====
Competitive, professional matches only, appearances as substitute in brackets.

Appearances made, broken down by competition and whether starter or substitute
No.	Name	Years	League (Note: Includes the Football Alliance and the Football League.)	FA Cup	League Cup	Other (Note: Includes appearances in the now-defunct Anglo-Italian Cup, Anglo-Scottish Cup, Inter-Cities Fairs Cup and Texaco Cup.)	Total
1	Gil Merrick	1946–1959	485 (0)	56 (0)	0 (0)	10 (0)	551 (0)
2	Frank Womack	1908–1928	491 (0)	24 (0)	0 (0)	0 (0)	515 (0)
3	Joe Bradford	1920–1935	414 (0)	31 (0)	0 (0)	0 (0)	445 (0)
4	Ken Green	1947–1958	401 (0)	36 (0)	0 (0)	4 (0)	440 (0)
5	Johnny Crosbie	1920–1932	409 (0)	23 (0)	0 (0)	0 (0)	432 (0)
6	Trevor Smith	1953–1964	365 (0)	35 (0)	12 (0)	18 (0)	430 (0)
7	Malcolm Beard	1960–1970	349 (1)	24 (1)	25 (0)	4 (0)	402 (2)
8	Dan Tremelling	1919–1931	382 (0)	13 (0)	0 (0)	0 (0)	395 (0)
9	Malcolm Page	1965–1980	328 (8)	29 (0)	14 (0)	12 (0)	383 (8)
10	Harry Hibbs	1926–1938	358 (0)	30 (0)	0 (0)	0 (0)	388 (0)

=== Goalscorers ===
- Most goals in a season: 42, by Walter Abbott in 1898–99.
- Most league goals in a season: 34, by Walter Abbott in the Second Division, 1898–99.
- Most league goals in a top-flight season: 29, by Joe Bradford in 1927–28.
- Most goals in a competitive match: 6, by Will Devey against Nottingham Forest, Football Alliance, 8 March 1890.

==== Top goalscorers ====
Joe Bradford is the all-time top goalscorer for Birmingham City. He was their leading goalscorer for twelve consecutive seasons, from 1921–22 to 1932–33, and won 12 caps for England.

Competitive, professional matches only. Matches played (including as substitute) appear in brackets.

Goals scored and appearances made, broken down by competition
No.	Name	Years	League (Note: Includes the Football Alliance and the Football League and the Premier League)	FA Cup	League Cup	Other (Note: Includes goals and appearances in promotion test matches and the now-defunct Anglo-Italian Cup, Anglo-Scottish Cup, Inter-Cities Fairs Cup and Texaco Cup.)	Total
1	Joe Bradford	1920–1935	249 (414)	18 (31)	0 (0)	0 (0)	267 (445)
2	Trevor Francis	1970–1979	119 (280)	6 (20)	4 (19)	4 (10)	133 (329)
3	Peter Murphy	1952–1960	107 (245)	16 (24)	0 (0)	4 (9)	127 (278)
4	Fred Wheldon	1890–1896	99 (155)	12 (13)	0 (0)	5 (7)	116 (175)
5	George Briggs	1924–1933	98 (298)	9 (26)	0 (0)	0 (0)	107 (324)
6	Billy Jones	1901–1909; 1912–1913	99 (236)	3 (17)	0 (0)	0 (0)	102 (253)
7	Geoff Vowden	1964–1970	79 (221)	8 (16)	7 (16)	0 (0)	94 (253)
8	Eddy Brown	1954–1958	74 (158)	13 (18)	0 (0)	3 (9)	90 (185)
9	Bob Latchford	1969–1974	68 (160)	6 (12)	6 (16)	4 (6)	84 (193)
10	Bob McRoberts	1898–1905	70 (173)	12 (14)	0 (0)	0 (0)	82 (187)

=== International caps ===
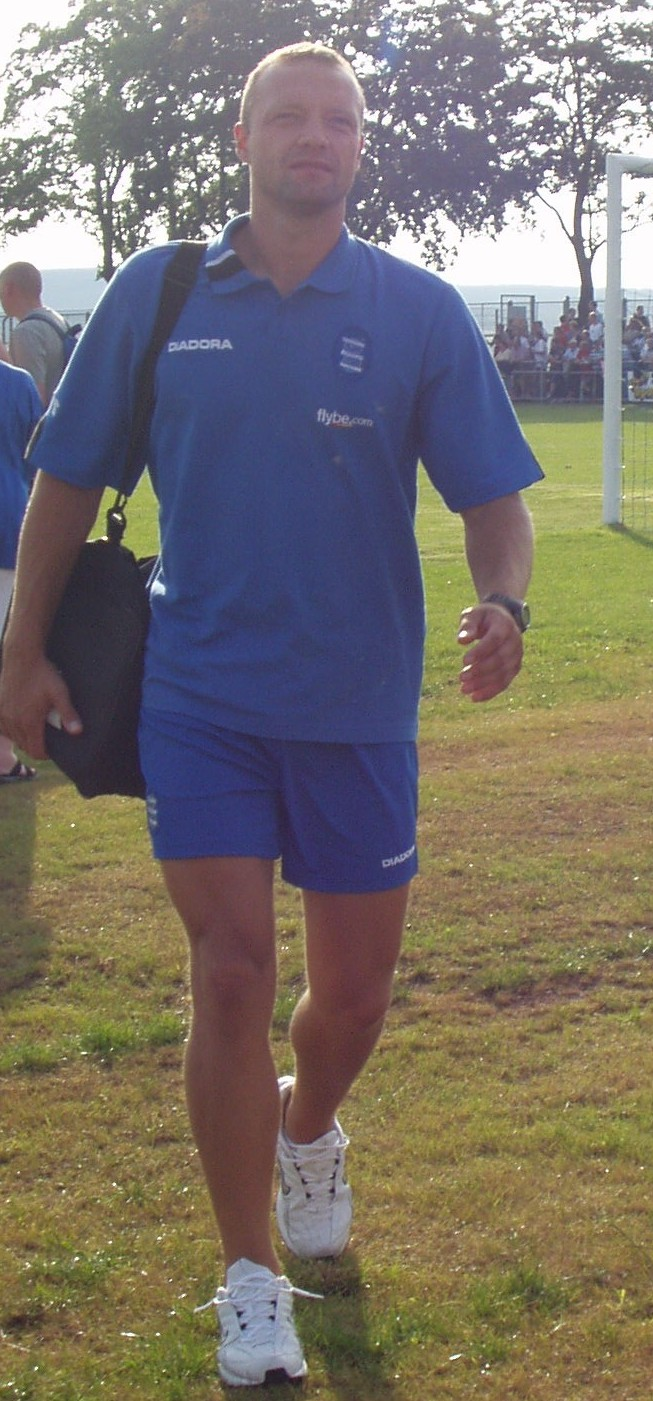
Maik Taylor, the club's most capped player

This section refers only to caps won while a Birmingham player.

- First capped player: Caesar Jenkyns, for Wales against Ireland on 27 February 1892.
- First capped player for England: Chris Charsley, against Ireland on 25 February 1893.
- Most capped player: Maik Taylor with 58 caps for Northern Ireland while a Birmingham player. (Note: Taylor's total includes caps won while on loan from Fulham.)
- Most capped player for England: Harry Hibbs with 25 caps while a Birmingham player.
- First player to play in the World Cup Finals: Gil Merrick for England against Belgium in Basel on 17 June 1954. Ken Green was also in England's 17-man travelling squad for the 1954 FIFA World Cup Finals but did not play.

=== Transfers ===
Trevor Francis, who joined Birmingham as a 15-year-old, became the first British footballer to be transferred for a fee of at least £1 million when Brian Clough signed him for league champions Nottingham Forest in February 1979. The basic fee was below £1m – Clough claimed in his autobiography to have set the fee at £999,999 because he did not want the idea of being the first £1m player going to Francis's head – but VAT and the transfer levy raised the total payable to £1.18m. Within three months he scored the winning goal in the 1979 European Cup Final. Some four years earlier, Birmingham had also been involved in a British record transfer when they sold Bob Latchford to Everton, in part exchange for Howard Kendall and Archie Styles, the deal valuing Latchford at £350,000. The initial £25m reportedly received from Borussia Dortmund for Jude Bellingham in 2020 made him the most expensive 17-year-old in world football history.

For consistency, fees in the record transfer tables below are all sourced from BBC Sport's contemporary reports of each transfer. Where the report mentions an initial fee potentially rising to a higher figure depending on contractual clauses being satisfied in the future, only the initial fee is listed in the tables.

==== Record transfer fees paid ====
Transfer fees paid, club involved, player name and nationality, and date of transfer
No.	Fee	Paid to	For	Date	Refs
1	£10m plus	Fulham	Jay Stansfield (England)	31 August 2024	
2	£6.3m	Dinamo Zagreb	Ivan Šunjić (Croatia)	26 July 2019	
3	£6m plus	Brentford	Jota (Spain)	31 August 2017	
4	£6m	Valencia	Nikola Žigić (Serbia)	26 May 2010	
5	£5.5m	Blackburn Rovers	David Dunn (England)	7 July 2003	

==== Record transfer fees received ====
Transfer fees received, club involved, player name and nationality, and date of transfer
No.	Fee	Received from	For	Date	Refs
1	£25m	Borussia Dortmund	Jude Bellingham (England)	23 July 2020	(Note: The fee was undisclosed, but was understood by Sky Sports to be an initial £25 million – making him the most expensive 17-year-old in history – plus "several million more" dependent on performance-related criteria. BBC Sport states only that the transfer "could eventually be worth over £30m.")
2	£15m	Southampton	Che Adams (England)	1 July 2019	
3	£6.7m	Liverpool	Jermaine Pennant (England)	26 July 2006	
4	£6m	West Ham United	Matthew Upson (England)	31 January 2007	
5	£5.5m	Wigan Athletic	Emile Heskey (England)	7 July 2006	

== Managerial records ==
- First full-time manager: Prior to 1911, the club was managed by committee or by a secretary-manager who combined club administration with responsibility for the team's affairs on the pitch. Bob McRoberts, the first manager whose role did not include secretarial duties, took charge of the team for four complete seasons, which included 163 matches, from June 1911 to May 1915.
- Longest-serving manager by time: George Liddell managed the club for six years and two months, which included 267 matches, from July 1933 to September 1939.
- Longest-serving manager by matches: Trevor Francis managed the club for 290 matches over a period of five years and five months, from May 1996 to October 2001.

All three of the above had formerly played for the club.

== Club records ==
=== Goals ===
Sourced to the Football Club History Database:

- Most league goals scored in a season: 103 in 28 matches, Second Division, 1893–94
- Fewest league goals scored in a season:
  - 28 in 38 matches, Premier League, 2005–06
  - 30 in 42 matches, First Division, 1985–86
- Most league goals conceded in a season: 96 in 42 matches, First Division, 1964–65
- Fewest league goals conceded in a season: 24 in 42 matches, Second Division, 1947–48

=== Points ===
Sourced to the Football Club History Database:

- Most points in a season:
  - Two points for a win: 59 in 42 matches, Second Division, 1947–48
  - Three points for a win: 111 in 46 matches, League One (level 3), 2024–25
- Fewest points in a season:
  - Two points for a win:
    - 20 in 30 matches, First Division, 1895–96
    - 22 in 42 matches, First Division, 1978–79
  - Three points for a win: 29 in 42 matches, First Division, 1985–86

=== Matches ===
==== Firsts ====
- First match: Small Heath Alliance 1–1 Holte Wanderers, a friendly at Arthur Street, November 1875
- First FA Cup match: Small Heath Alliance 4–1 Derby Town, first round, at Muntz Street, 17 October 1881
- First Football Alliance match: Small Heath 3–2 Birmingham St George's, 7 September 1889
- First Football League match: Small Heath 5–1 Burslem Port Vale, 3 September 1892
- First First Division match: Aston Villa 2–1 Small Heath, 1 September 1894
- First match at St Andrew's: Birmingham 0–0 Middlesbrough, First Division, 26 December 1906
- First European match: Internazionale 0–0 Birmingham City, Inter-Cities Fairs Cup, group stage, 15 May 1956
- First League Cup match: Bradford Park Avenue 0–1 Birmingham City, second round, 31 October 1960

==== Record wins ====
Sourced to the Birmingham City FC Archive:

- Record league win:
  - Small Heath 12–0 Nottingham Forest, Football Alliance, 8 March 1889
  - Small Heath 12–0 Doncaster Rovers, Second Division, 11 April 1903
  - Small Heath 12–0 Walsall Town Swifts, Second Division, 17 December 1892
- Record FA Cup win: Small Heath 10–0 Druids, fourth qualifying round, 9 November 1893
- Record League Cup win:
  - Birmingham City 6–0 Manchester City, fifth round, 11 December 1962
  - Birmingham City 6–0 Macclesfield Town, second round, 22 September 1998
- Record European win: Birmingham City 5–0 KB, Inter-Cities Fairs Cup quarter final, 7 December 1960

==== Record defeats ====
Sourced to the Birmingham City FC Archive except where stated:

- Record league defeat:
  - Sheffield Wednesday 9–1 Small Heath, Football Alliance, 21 December 1889
  - Newton Heath 9–1 Small Heath, Football Alliance, 7 April 1890
  - Blackburn Rovers 9–1 Small Heath, First Division, 5 February 1895
  - Derby County 8–0 Birmingham, First Division, 30 November 1895
  - Newcastle United 8–0 Birmingham, First Division, 23 November 1905
  - Sheffield Wednesday 9–1 Birmingham, First Division, 13 December 1930
  - Preston North End 8–0 Birmingham, First Division, 1 February 1958
  - Birmingham City 0–8 AFC Bournemouth, Championship, 25 October 2014
- Record FA Cup defeat: Birmingham City 0–7 Liverpool, quarter final, 21 March 2006
- Record League Cup defeat: Manchester City 6–0 Birmingham City, third round, 10 October 2001
- Record European defeat: RCD Espanyol 5–2 Birmingham City, Inter-Cities Fairs Cup, second round, 11 November 1961

=== Record consecutive results ===
This section applies to league matches only, and is sourced to Statto.com except where stated:

- Record consecutive wins: 13, from 17 December 1892 to 16 September 1893, Second Division
- Record consecutive defeats:
  - 8, from 26 December 1922 to 17 February 1923, First Division
  - 8, from 2 December 1978 to 24 February 1979, First Division
  - 8, from 28 September 1985 to 23 November 1985, First Division
- Record consecutive matches without a defeat: 20, from 3 September 1994 to 2 January 1995, Second Division (level 3)
- Record consecutive top-division matches without a defeat: 12, from 24 October 2009 to 9 January 2010, Premier League
- Record consecutive home matches without a defeat: 36, from 20 October 1970 to 25 April 1972, Second Division
- Record consecutive away matches without a defeat: 15, from 13 December 1947 to 4 September 1948, Second and First Divisions
- Record consecutive matches without a win: 17, from 28 September 1985 to 18 January 1986, First Division
- Record consecutive home matches without a win: 18, from 5 October 2013 to 29 April 2014, Championship
- Record consecutive away matches without a win: 32, from 15 November 1980 to 28 April 1982, First Division

=== Attendances ===
Average and peak league attendances at St Andrew's

This section applies to attendances at St Andrew's, where Birmingham have played their home matches since 1906. Figures from the club's early days are approximate.

- Highest attendance: 66,844 against Everton, FA Cup fifth round, 11 February 1939
- Highest league attendance: 60,250, against Aston Villa, First Division, 23 November 1935
- Lowest attendance:
  - 1,000, against Blackpool, Second Division, 27 November 1909
  - 1,000, against Burnley, Second Division, 28 February 1910
- Highest seasonal average league attendance: 38,821, First Division, 1948–49
- Lowest seasonal average league attendance: 6,289, Second Division, 1988–89

== Birmingham City in Europe ==
Invitations to enter the Inter-Cities Fairs Cup, a football tournament set up to promote industrial trade fairs, were extended to the city hosting the trade fair rather than to clubs. Some cities entered a select team including players from more than one club, but Aston Villa, the other major club based in the city of Birmingham, rejected the opportunity to field a combined team. Thus Birmingham City became the first English club side to play in European competition when they played their first match in the 1955–58 Inter-Cities Fairs Cup on 15 May 1956. They were also the first English club side to reach a European final, the 1960 Fairs Cup final, in which they met Barcelona. The home leg, a goalless draw, was played on 29 March 1960 and the away leg, which Barcelona won 4–1, some six weeks later. (Note: The London XI, including players from several London clubs, were the first English team to play in European competition when they played their first match in the inaugural Fairs Cup in 1955, and the first English team to reach a final, in the same campaign.) In the semifinal of the 1961 Fairs Cup Birmingham beat Internazionale home and away; no other English club beat them in a competitive match in the San Siro until Arsenal did so in the Champions League more than 40 years later.

Victory in the 2011 Football League Cup Final earned Birmingham qualification for the 2011–12 UEFA Europa League, which they entered at the play-off round. A 3–0 aggregate victory over C.D. Nacional of Portugal qualified Birmingham for the group stage, in which they were drawn alongside the previous season's finalists, S.C. Braga of Portugal, Slovenian champions NK Maribor, and fourth-placed Belgian team Club Brugge. They finished third in group H, one point behind Club Brugge and Braga, so failed to qualify for the knockout rounds.

=== Record by season ===
Birmingham City's scores are given first in all scorelines.

Season	Competition	Round	Opponent		Home leg	Away leg	Play- off	Notes	Refs
Season	Competition	Round	Country	Club	Home leg	Away leg	Play- off	Notes	Refs
1955–58	Inter-Cities Fairs Cup	GS	Italy	Internazionale	2–1	0–0		(Note: Invitations to enter the Inter-Cities Fairs Cup, a football tournament set up to promote industrial trade fairs, were extended to the city hosting the trade fair rather than to clubs. Some cities entered a select team including players from more than one club; others, including Birmingham, chose a club side to represent them.)	
1955–58	Inter-Cities Fairs Cup	GS	Yugoslavia	Zagreb XI	3–0	1–0			
1955–58	Inter-Cities Fairs Cup	SF	Spain	Barcelona	4–3	0–1	1–2	(Note: The away goals rule did not apply when aggregate scores were level, so a playoff was staged at St. Jakob-Park, Basel, which Barcelona won 2–1 to reach the final.)	
1958–60	Inter-Cities Fairs Cup	1R	Germany	Cologne XI	2–0	2–2		(Note: Until the mid-1960s, entry to this competition remained by invitation, independent of domestic league position. Birmingham City's continued invitations resulted from their success in the previous edition of the competition. In 1961–62, there was an expanded entry of 28 teams, and Birmingham received a bye to the second round as losing finalist from the previous edition.)	
1958–60	Inter-Cities Fairs Cup	2R	Yugoslavia	Zagreb XI	1–0	3–3			
1958–60	Inter-Cities Fairs Cup	SF	Belgium	R. Union Saint-Gilloise	4–2	4–2			
1958–60	Inter-Cities Fairs Cup	F	Spain	Barcelona	0–0	1–4			
1960–61	Inter-Cities Fairs Cup	1R	Hungary	Újpesti Dózsa	3–2	2–1			
1960–61	Inter-Cities Fairs Cup	2R	Denmark	KB	5–0	4–4			
1960–61	Inter-Cities Fairs Cup	SF	Italy	Internazionale	2–1	2–1			
1960–61	Inter-Cities Fairs Cup	F	Italy	A.S. Roma	2–2	0–2			
1961–62	Inter-Cities Fairs Cup	2R	Spain	RCD Espanyol	1–0	2–5			
2011–12	UEFA Europa League	PO	Portugal	C.D. Nacional	3–0	0–0			
2011–12	UEFA Europa League	GS	Portugal	S.C. Braga	1–3	0–1			
2011–12	UEFA Europa League	GS	Slovenia	NK Maribor	1–0	2–1			
2011–12	UEFA Europa League	GS	Belgium	Club Brugge	2–2	2–1			

Key

- PO = play-off round
- GS = group stage
- 1R = first round
- 2R = second round
- SF = semifinal
- F = final

=== European attendance records ===
- Highest home attendance: 40,524, against Barcelona, 1960 Fairs Cup final first leg, 29 March 1960
- Lowest home attendance: 14,152, against R. Union Saint-Gilloise, 1958–60 Fairs Cup semifinal second leg, 11 November 1959
- Highest away attendance: 75,000, against Barcelona, 1958–60 Fairs Cup final second leg, 4 May 1960
- Lowest away attendance: 2,500, against KB, 1960–61 Fairs Cup second round first leg, 23 November 1960
