= William Ashurst =

William Ashurst may refer to:

- Bill Ashurst (footballer) (1894–1947), English footballer
- Bill Ashurst (1948–2022), rugby league footballer
- William Henry Ashurst (judge) (1725–1807), English judge
- William Henry Ashurst (solicitor) (1792–1855), English solicitor
- William Ashurst (Roundhead) (1607–1656), English politician and soldier during the Interregnum
- William W. Ashurst (1893–1952), United States Marine Corps general

== See also ==
- William Ashhurst (1647–1720), English politician and banker, Mayor of London 1693-94
