= Jock Morgan =

Scottish footballer

Personal information
- Full name: John Morgan
- Date of birth: 18 August 1889
- Place of birth: Penicuik, Scotland
- Date of death: 1983
- Height: 5 ft 8 in (1.73 m)
- Position: Half back

Senior career*
Years	Team	Apps	(Gls)
- Edinburgh Emmett
1924–192?	Birmingham	1	(0)
192?–1926	Redditch Town		
1926–1930	Doncaster Rovers	150	(4)
1930–1931	Bristol City	1	(0)
1931–1933	Barrow	66	(0)
1933–1934	Walsall	19	(0)
1934–193?	Southport	10	(0)
–	Brideville		
–	Worcester City		
1938–19??	Atherstone Town		
- * Club domestic league appearances and goals

John Morgan (18 August 1889 – 1983) was a Scottish professional footballer who made nearly 250 appearances in the Football League playing for Birmingham, Doncaster Rovers, Bristol City, Barrow, Walsall and Southport. He played as a half back.

Morgan was born in Penicuik, Midlothian. He began his football career with Edinburgh Emmett and then came to England to sign for Birmingham of the First Division in August 1924. He played only once for Birmingham, deputising for the injured Jimmy Cringan and his regular understudy Bill Hunter at centre half in a 4–0 defeat at Sunderland on 6 September 1924. After a brief spell in non-league football with Redditch Town he settled at Doncaster Rovers, where he played 150 Third Division North games in four seasons. After one Second Division game in one and a half seasons for Bristol City, a return to the Third with Barrow offered more playing time. Short spells with Walsall and Southport and a venture to Ireland with Brideville preceded a return to non-league football in the English Midlands with Worcester City and Atherstone Town.

Morgan died in 1983 aged 93 or 94.
