= Ted Linley =

Ted Linley may refer to:

- Ted Linley (footballer),
- E. W. (Ted) Linley, a Canadian politician in Huron Shores, Ontario.
