= Dickie Dale (footballer) =

English footballer (1896–1975)

Personal information
- Full name: Richard Armstrong Dale
- Date of birth: 21 May 1896
- Place of birth: Willington, County Durham, England
- Date of death: 1975 (aged 78–79)
- Place of death: Newcastle, England
- Height: 5 ft 9 in (1.75 m)
- Position: Wing half

Senior career*
Years	Team	Apps	(Gls)
- Stanley United
- North Walbottle
- West Hartlepool
1922–1928	Birmingham	146	(0)
1928–1931	West Bromwich Albion	19	(0)
1931–1932	Tranmere Rovers	7	(0)
1932–193?	Crook Town		
- Throckley Welfare
- * Club domestic league appearances and goals

Richard Armstrong Dale (21 May 1896 – 1975) was an English professional footballer who played as a wing half. He played 146 games in the First Division of the Football League for Birmingham before moving on to West Bromwich Albion and Tranmere Rovers. He finished his career back in his native north-east of England, in non-League football with Crook Town.

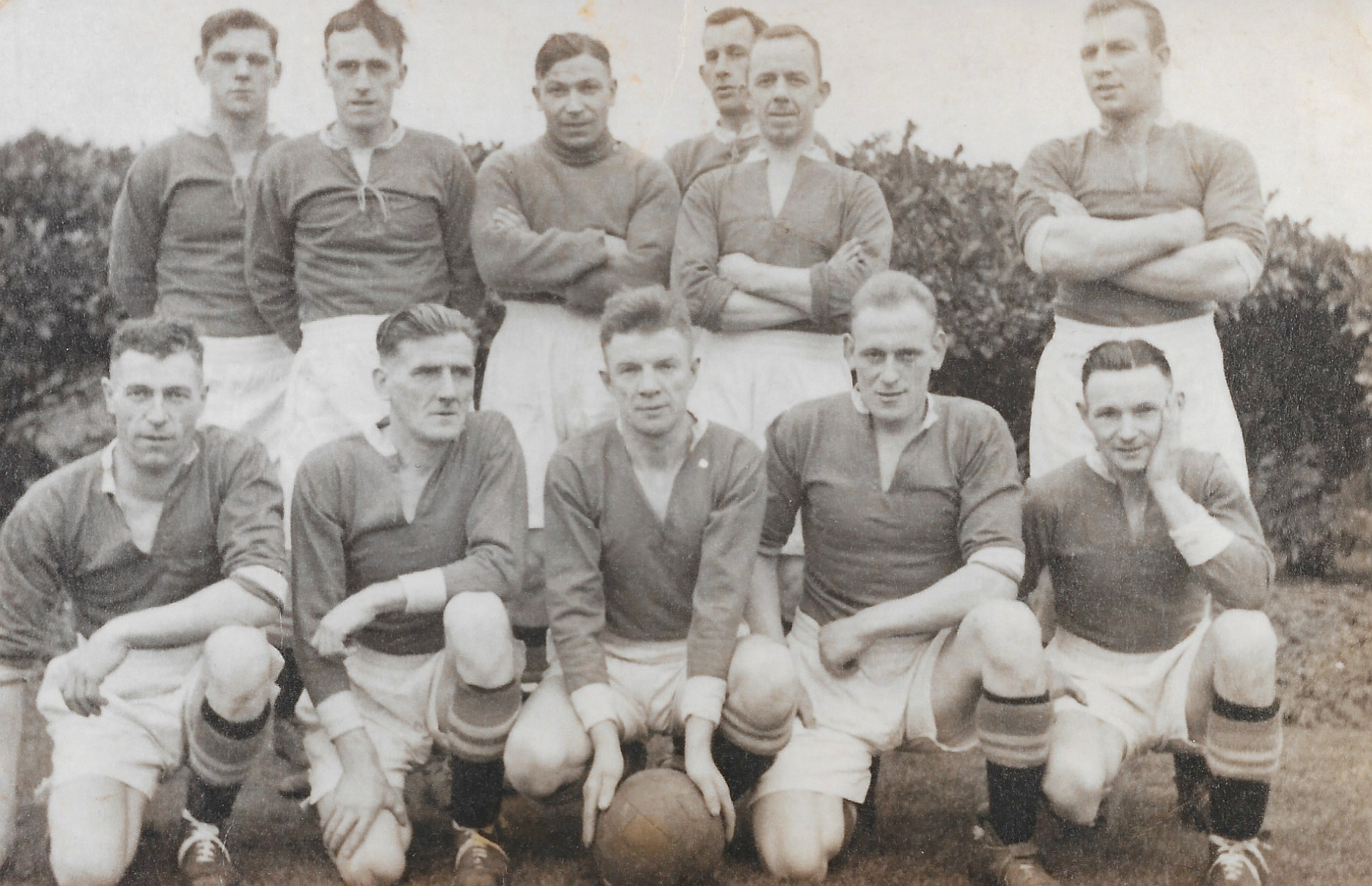

== Life and career ==
Dale was born in Willington, County Durham, in 1896, the son of James Dale, an engine man in a coal mine, and his wife Elizabeth. The 1911 Census finds him living with his parents and two younger sisters in North Walbottle, Northumberland, and working as a pony driver in a coal mine.

Dale played for Stanley United, North Walbottle and West Hartlepool before joining Football League First Division club Birmingham on trial in March 1922. The trial proved successful, he made his Football League debut on 6 September 1922 in a goalless draw away to Newcastle United, and, according to the Athletic News in March 1924, he "gave such a sound and, indeed, striking display, even at left half-back, that he has been considered a regular member of the side ever since." He kept his place for two more matches before the England international Percy Barton returned from injury. A few weeks later, after more injuries left a vacancy at right half, Dale "demonstrated his versatility by at once falling into the position", and held it until mid-March 1923 when Jimmy Daws came back into the team. He made 34 League appearances in the 1923–24 season, mainly at right half but also covering at centre half.

Over the next three seasons, he played in 75 League matches, not always first choice in the starting eleven but always first choice as cover for any half-back position. Often noted for his enthusiasm and work-rate, and sometimes for his judgment, he was at his peak from 1925 to 1926, having dislodged Barton to the covering role in the latter part of the 1925–26 season and retained the left-half position for much of the following campaign. In September 1927, he stood in successfully for Jimmy Cringan at centre half, but played little during the rest of the season. Early in the 1928–29 season, Dale stood in for the injured Barton for seven games, and was reported to have "[given] a good account of himself" in a goalless draw away against Arsenal, but he was soon to move on. He had played 151 matches in League and FA Cup but, despite the Sports Argus correspondent's view some four years earlier that he was "fast developing into a good shot", never scored.

Second Division club West Bromwich Albion, who were in dire need of a half-back, – they had three left halves on the books, all of whom were unfit – paid "just over two thousand pounds" for Dale's services, and put him straight into their League eleven. An injury in mid-January kept him out for two months, and he made only ten League appearances, followed with nine in 1929–30. He married Alice Sadler in Newcastle during the 1930 close season.

After a season unable to break back into the first team as Albion gained promotion to the First Division and beat Birmingham in the 1931 FA Cup Final, Dale joined Tranmere Rovers of the Third Division North for a club record fee paid of £400. He made ten appearances in all senior competitions, and returned to his native north east of England. In November 1932, he joined North-Eastern League club Crook Town as player-coach.

The 1939 Register finds him living in Newburn, Northumberland, and working as a colliery labourer. In the early 1950s, he was scouting for West Bromwich Albion. Dale died in Newcastle in 1975 at the age of 79.

== Career statistics ==
Appearances and goals by club, season and competition
Club	Season	League			FA Cup		Total	
Club	Season	Division	Apps	Goals	Apps	Goals	Apps	Goals
Birmingham	1922–23	First Division	22	0	1	0	23	0
Birmingham	1923–24	First Division	34	0	1	0	35	0
Birmingham	1924–25	First Division	22	0	1	0	23	0
Birmingham	1925–26	First Division	24	0	1	0	25	0
Birmingham	1926–27	First Division	29	0	1	0	30	0
Birmingham	1927–28	First Division	8	0	0	0	8	0
Birmingham	1928–29	First Division	7	0	0	0	7	0
Birmingham	Total		146	0	5	0	151	0
West Bromwich Albion	1928–29	Second Division	10	0	2	0	12	0
West Bromwich Albion	1929–30	Second Division	9	0	0	0	9	0
West Bromwich Albion	1930–31	First Division	0	0	0	0	0	0
West Bromwich Albion	Total		19	0	2	0	21	0
Tranmere Rovers	1931–32	Third Division North	7	0	3	0	10	0
Total			172	0	10	0	182	0
