= Joe Smith (footballer, born 1890) =

England footballer

Personal information
- Full name: Joseph Smith
- Date of birth: 17 April 1890
- Place of birth: Netherton, Dudley, Worcestershire, England
- Date of death: 9 June 1956 (aged 66)
- Place of death: Wolverhampton, Staffordshire, England
- Height: 5 ft 6 in (1.68 m)
- Position: Right back

Senior career*
Years	Team	Apps	(Gls)
–	Netherton St Andrew's		
–	Darby End Victoria		
–	Cradley Heath St Luke's		
1910–1926	West Bromwich Albion	434	(0)
1926–1929	Birmingham	48	(0)
1929–1932	Worcester City		

International career
1919–1922	England	2	(0)

Managerial career
- 1929–1932: Worcester City (player-manager)
- * Club domestic league appearances and goals

Joseph Smith (17 April 1890 – 9 June 1956) was an English professional footballer who played as a right back. He played nearly 500 games in the Football League for West Bromwich Albion and Birmingham (now Birmingham City), most of which were in the First Division, and won two caps for England.

== Playing career ==
Smith was born in Darby End in the Netherton area of Dudley, Worcestershire (now West Midlands). He played local football before turning professional with West Bromwich Albion in May 1910, and made his debut four months later in a Division Two match against Bolton Wanderers. He was part of the Albion team that won promotion from the Second Division in the 1910–11 season. During the First World War he made guest appearances for Everton and Notts County. When competitive football resumed after the war, he was selected for England for the first time, in a 1–1 draw with Ireland in October 1919; he made one further appearance for England in 1922. Smith contributed to West Bromwich Albion winning the First Division in the 1919–20 season, and went on to play 434 league matches for the club.

In 1926, by which time he was 36 years old, Smith joined Birmingham, to provide cover at full-back for Frank Womack and Jack Jones. He stayed with the club for three seasons, playing 50 games, including 48 in the First Division.

He then joined Worcester City as player-manager, leading them to the Birmingham & District League title in his first season, then two years later finishing as runners-up, losing the title only on goal average, after which he retired from the game.

== Later life ==
After retiring from football, Smith went on to keep a pub, and later worked at Lloyds Proving House in Netherton, where chain was tested for quality. He died in hospital in Wolverhampton in 1956, at the age of 66.
