= William Owen (footballer, born 1906) =

English footballer

Personal information
- Full name: William Owen
- Date of birth: 1906 (Note: Joyce gives birth year of 1906 whereas Matthews gives April 1903.)
- Place of birth: Coventry, England
- Height: 6 ft 0 in (1.83 m)
- Position: Goalkeeper

Senior career*
Years	Team	Apps	(Gls)
- Nuneaton Borough
1926–1927	Birmingham	5	(0)
1927–1930	Fulham	0	(0)
1930–193?	Coventry City	5	(0)
–	Nuneaton Borough		
–	Stourbridge		
- * Club domestic league appearances and goals

William Owen (1906 – after 1930) was an English professional footballer who played in the Football League for Birmingham and Coventry City. He played as a goalkeeper.

Owen was born in Coventry. He joined Birmingham from Nuneaton Borough in April 1926. He made his debut in the First Division on 15 January 1927 in a 3–2 defeat at Burnley, the first of a run of six games in which he deputised for Dan Tremelling. Once Tremelling became available again, Owen returned to the reserves. He moved on to Fulham and Coventry City, for whom he played five Third Division South games in the 1930–31 season before returning to non-league football with former club Nuneaton and with Stourbridge.
