= Albert Sykes =

English footballer (1900–1994)

Personal information
- Date of birth: 29 September 1900
- Place of birth: Shirebrook, England
- Date of death: 1994 (aged 94)
- Place of death: Rotherham, England
- Position: Left half

Senior career*
| Years | Team | Apps | (Gls) |
- Maltby Victoria
- Maltby Main CW
| 1924–1926 | Birmingham | 1 | (0) |
| 1926–1928 | Brighton & Hove Albion | 16 | (0) |
| 1928–1931 | Lincoln City | 42 | (1) |
| 1931–193? | Peterborough & Fletton United | | |
| – | Luton Town | 0 | (0) |
| 1932–1933 | Grantham | | (1) |
- * Club domestic league appearances and goals

Albert Sykes (29 September 1900 – 1994) was an English professional footballer who played in the Football League for Birmingham, Brighton & Hove Albion and Lincoln City.

Sykes was born in Shirebrook, Derbyshire. A coal miner by trade, he played football for Maltby Victoria and Maltby Main Colliery Welfare before turning professional with First Division club Birmingham in August 1924. He played only once for Birmingham's first team, standing in for George Liddell in a 3–2 defeat away to Burnley on 2 February 1925, and joined Third Division South club Brighton & Hove Albion in May 1926. Sykes played 16 league games in two seasons with Brighton before signing for Lincoln City in June 1928. He remained with Lincoln for three seasons, playing 44 games in all competitions, of which 42 were in the Third Division North. He finished off his playing career in non-league football with successively Peterborough & Fletton United, Luton Town and Grantham, where he played in most of the fixtures of the 1932–33 season.

Sykes died in Rotherham, South Yorkshire in 1994.
