= Tom Devlin =

Scottish footballer

Personal information
- Date of birth: 10 April 1903 (Note: Michael Joyce's Football League Players' Records gives a birth date of 10 April 1903, whereas Swindon-Town-FC.co.uk gives 6 October 1903.)
- Place of birth: Bellshill, Scotland
- Place of death: Scotland
- Position: Inside forward

Senior career*
Years	Team	Apps	(Gls)
- Vale of Clyde
- Shawfield Juniors
- Kilsyth Rangers
1923–1924	Third Lanark	7	(0)
1924	King's Park		
1924–1926	Birmingham	2	(1)
1926–1927	Preston North End	8	(1)
1927–1928	Liverpool	0	(0)
1928–1929	Swindon Town	1	(0)
1929–19xx	Brooklyn Wanderers		
1931–1932	Aberdeen	0	(0)
1932	Walsall	4	(0)
1932	Fall River		
1933–1934	FC Zürich		
1934	Fleetwood Town		
1934–193x	Oldham Athletic	2	(0)
1935–1936	RC Roubaix		
- Fleetwood Town
- * Club domestic league appearances and goals

James Thomas S. Devlin (10 April 1903 – after 1935) was a Scottish professional footballer who made 17 appearances in the Football League playing for Birmingham, Preston North End, Swindon Town, Walsall and Oldham Athletic. He played as an inside forward.

== Career ==
Devlin was born in Bellshill, North Lanarkshire. He began his football career with junior clubs before moving into the Scottish League, first with Third Lanark and then King's Park. He came to England to sign for Birmingham of the First Division in September 1924. Devlin played only twice for Birmingham, unable to dislodge Johnny Crosbie from the inside-right position, and in January 1926 joined Preston North End for a fee of £362. After only a few first-team games, Devlin was sold on to Liverpool for £250, at the same time as his brother William joined from Huddersfield. Unlike his brother, Tom Devlin failed to appear for Liverpool's first team, and moved on to Swindon Town 12 months later.

Then followed appearances for clubs in several countries, including Brooklyn Wanderers and Fall River in the United States, FC Zürich in Switzerland, and RC Roubaix in France, interspersed with a return to Scotland with Aberdeen, though again without appearing for the first team, and several more English clubs, including further appearances in the Football League with Walsall and Oldham Athletic. He retired from the game in about 1936, and died in his native Scotland.
