= Aubrey Scriven =

English footballer (1904–1988)

Personal information
- Full name: Aubrey Scriven
- Date of birth: 7 July 1904
- Place of birth: Highley, Shropshire, England
- Date of death: 30 April 1988 (aged 83)
- Place of death: Birmingham, England
- Height: 5 ft 8 in (1.73 m)
- Position: Outside left

Youth career
- Highley Boys' Club

Senior career*
Years	Team	Apps	(Gls)
–1923	Warmsworth		
1923	Denaby United		
1923–1927	Birmingham	52	(9)
1927–1932	Bradford City	105	(37)
1932–1934	Bristol City	54	(12)
1934–1935	Worcester City		(13)
1935–1940	Brierley Hill Alliance		
- * Club domestic league appearances and goals

Aubrey Scriven (7 July 1904 – 30 April 1988) was an English professional footballer who played as an outside left for Birmingham, Bradford City and Bristol City in the Football League. He also played non-league football for Warmsworth, Denaby United, Worcester City and Brierley Hill Alliance.

== Life and career ==
Scriven was born on 7 July 1904 in Highley, near Bridgnorth in Shropshire, to William Scriven, a roadman in a coal mine, and his wife Rose Ann. He played football for Highley Boys' Club before moving to Warmsworth, West Riding of Yorkshire, where he helped the village team win the Doncaster Amateur League title in 1922–23. According to the South Yorkshire Times of September 1923, "he is fast, has good ball control, centres accurately and shoots strongly from all angles. When he gains complete confidence in himself he should be one of the most dangerous wingers". He signed for Denaby United of the Midland League ahead of the 1923–24 season, and his performances attracted attention from clubs at a higher level. He was ever-present in senior competition for Denaby until, at the end of November, he joined Football League First Division club Birmingham for an undisclosed fee.

Scriven began his Birmingham career with the reserve team in the Central League. He made his Football League debut on 7 September 1924, replacing Ted Linley at outside left for the home match against Bolton Wanderers which Birmingham won 1–0. He kept his place for a couple of months before Linley took over, and then returned to the side for the last month of the season, during which he scored twice. Inconsistency meant he never established himself as a first-team regular. Over the next two seasons, he shared the position with players including Ernie Islip, Jack Russell and Billy Thirlaway, taking his appearance total to 60, of which all but one were made in league matches, with 9 goals.

Scriven signed for Bradford City in May 1927, as part of a £400 deal that also took Islip to the club. He made 105 appearances in the Football League, scoring 37 goals, as well as scoring once from 6 FA Cup matches, and left the club in May 1932 to join Bristol City.

He spent two seasons with Bristol City, during which he scored 17 goals from 67 appearances in all competitions, of which 54 appearances and 12 goals came in the Third Division South. He also scored in the final as Bristol City won the 1933–34 Welsh Cup, beating another English club, Tranmere Rovers, 3–0 in a replay after the original match was drawn. Scriven moved into non-league football with Worcester City in 1934. In his only season with the club, he scored 13 goals in the Birmingham & District League, and then joined Brierley Hill Alliance, where he remained until retiring from football during the war.

Scriven ran the Bell Inn, in Livery Street, central Birmingham. His wife, Lily née Gunn, and their 10-year-old daughter, Audrey Jean, were killed when the city centre was bombed in October 1940 during the Birmingham Blitz. Scriven remarried in 1942, to Vera Thompson. After the war, he worked as a maintenance man at Monument Road Baths in Ladywood, Birmingham. He died in Birmingham on 30 April 1988, aged 83.

== Honours ==
Bristol City

- Welsh Cup winner: 1933–34

== Sources ==
- Frost, Terry (1988). Bradford City A Complete Record 1903–1988. Derby: Breedon Books Sport. ISBN 0-907969-38-0.
- Joyce, Michael (2004). Football League Players' Records 1888 to 1939. Nottingham: SoccerData. ISBN 978-1-899468-67-6.
- Matthews, Tony (1995). Birmingham City: A Complete Record. Derby: Breedon Books. ISBN 978-1-85983-010-9.
