= Harry Isherwood =

English footballer

Personal information
- Full name: Harold Isherwood
- Date of birth: May 1905 (Note: Matthews gives May 1905 where Joyce gives 1901.)
- Place of birth: Darwen, England
- Height: 5 ft 6 in (1.68 m)
- Position: Left back

Senior career*
Years	Team	Apps	(Gls)
- Fleetwood
1926–1927	Sunderland	0	(0)
1927–1928	Birmingham	1	(0)
1928–1929	Bournemouth & Boscombe Athletic	18	(0)
1929–19??	Worcester City		
- * Club domestic league appearances and goals

Harold Isherwood (May 1905 – after 1928) was an English professional footballer who played in the Football League for Birmingham and Bournemouth & Boscombe Athletic.

Isherwood was born in Darwen, Lancashire. He played football for Fleetwood before signing for First Division club Sunderland in 1926. He failed to break through to the first team, and left for fellow First Division side Birmingham in May 1927. He was tried out at left back in the last game of the 1926–27 season, on 7 May 1927 in a 3–2 defeat at home to Sheffield United. After spending the whole of the next season in the reserves, Isherwood moved on to Bournemouth & Boscombe Athletic. He played 18 games in the Third Division South, then dropped into non-league football with Worcester City in 1929.
