= Peggs Green =

Hamlet in Leicestershire, England

Coordinates: 52°45′20″N 01°23′23″W

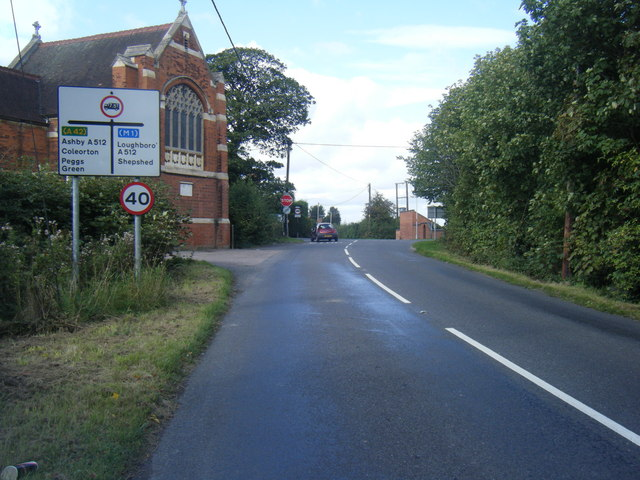
Church Hill, Peggs Green

Peggs Green is a hamlet within the parish of Coleorton, Leicestershire. For many years it had formed part of the civil parish of Thringstone, until this was dissolved in 1936.

It is probable that the hamlet derives its name from that of a former landowner, as nineteenth century references to it usually carry an apostrophe: "Pegg's Green"
A colliery was opened here in 1830, but had closed during the later part of the nineteenth century, presumably due to the coal here having been worked out or deemed too costly to mine at a profit.

Joe Bradford, the former England and Birmingham City footballer was born here in 1901. In 1920, Bradford scored fourteen goals in a match for Peggs Green Victoria against Birstall Rovers. Both Aston Villa and Derby County gave him trials, but it was Birmingham who signed him on 11 February 1920, Peggs Green receiving £100 and a further £25 when he made his debut. Bradford was to remain at Birmingham for fifteen years, where he made 445 appearances and scored 267 goals. This remains a club record. He was capped twelve times and scored seven goals for England, and following his Birmingham career played a final season for Bristol City.

For many years, Joe's brother was landlord of the New Inn at Peggs Green.
