= Frederick Castle (footballer) =

English footballer (1898–1974)

Personal information
- Full name: Frederick Charles Castle
- Date of birth: 29 November 1898
- Place of birth: King's Norton, Birmingham, England
- Date of death: 1974 (aged 75–76)
- Place of death: Smethwick, England
- Height: 5 ft 7 1/2 in (1.71 m)
- Position: Centre forward

Senior career*
Years	Team	Apps	(Gls)
- Smethwick Highfield
1925–1927	Birmingham	3	(0)
1927–19??	Shrewsbury Town		
- * Club domestic league appearances and goals

Frederick Charles Castle (29 November 1898 – 1974) was an English professional footballer who played in the Football League for Birmingham. He played as a centre forward.

Castle was born in Kings Norton, now a district of Birmingham. He played for Smethwick Highfield before joining Birmingham in April 1925. He made his debut in the First Division in the penultimate game of the 1925–26 season, deputising for George Briggs in a home game against West Ham United which Birmingham won 1–0. He kept his place for the last game of that season, and spent the next season as cover for Briggs. However, Briggs missed only one game, and in August 1927 Castle signed for Shrewsbury Town of the Birmingham & District League.

Castle died in Smethwick, West Midlands, late in 1974.
