= Edmund Harvey (footballer) =

English footballer

Personal information
- Full name: Edmund Martin Harvey
- Date of birth: 8 September 1900
- Place of birth: Kiveton Park, England
- Height: 5 ft 8 in (1.73 m)
- Position: Outside right

Senior career*
Years	Team	Apps	(Gls)
- Kiveton Park
	Huddersfield Town	0	(0)
1924–1926	Birmingham	13	(0)
1926–1927	York City	28	(2)
1927–1930	Bradford City	45	(15)
- * Club domestic league appearances and goals

Edmund Martin Harvey (8 September 1900 – after 1930), sometimes known as Martin Harvey, was an English professional footballer who played in the Football League for Birmingham and Bradford City.

== Career ==
Harvey was born in Kiveton Park, which was then in the West Riding of Yorkshire. He began his football career with Kiveton Park F.C., and was on the books of Huddersfield Town as an amateur, before turning professional with Birmingham in January 1924. An outside right, Harvey made his debut in the Football League First Division on 8 November 1924 in a 1–0 home win against West Ham United, and finished off the 1924–25 season with a run of ten games in the starting eleven. However, injury and poor form interrupted his career. He spent the 1926–27 season with York City in the Midland League, before returning to the Football League with Bradford City at the end of the season. With Bradford he showed good goalscoring form, with 15 goals in 45 league games, but injury forced his retirement in February 1930. He was appointed as trainer coach to the third team at Bradford in August 1933.
