= Bill Ashurst (footballer) =

English footballer

Personal information
- Full name: William Ashurst
- Date of birth: 4 May 1894
- Place of birth: Willington, England
- Date of death: 26 January 1947 (aged 52)
- Place of death: Bulwell, England
- Height: 5 ft 9 1/2 in (1.77 m)
- Position: Right back

Senior career*
Years	Team	Apps	(Gls)
1913–1914	Willington		
1914–????	Durham City		
1919	Leeds City	0	(0)
1919–1920	Lincoln City	24	(0)
1920–1926	Notts County	200	(0)
1926–1928	West Bromwich Albion	22	(1)
1928–????	Newark Town		
–1930	Brentwood Colliery		
- Bestwood Colliery

International career
1923–1925	England	5	(0)
1923	Football League XI	1	(0)
- * Club domestic league appearances and goals

William Ashurst (4 May 1894 – 26 January 1947) was an English professional footballer who made 200 appearances in the Football League for Notts County as a right back.

Ashurst also played League football for Lincoln City and West Bromwich Albion. He was capped by England at international level and represented the Football League XI.

== Personal life ==
Ashurst's younger brother Eli also became a footballer. During the First World War, Ashurst served as a gunner in the Royal Field Artillery and as a private in the Tank Corps.

== Career statistics ==
Appearances and goals by club, season and competition
Club	Season	League			FA Cup		Total	
Club	Season	Division	Apps	Goals	Apps	Goals	Apps	Goals
Lincoln City	1919–20	Second Division	24	0	0	0	24	0
Notts County	1922–23	Second Division	41	0	0	0	41	0
Notts County	1923–24	First Division	33	0	0	0	33	0
Notts County	1924–25	First Division	30	0	0	0	30	0
Notts County	1925–26	First Division	19	0	0	0	19	0
Notts County	Total		123	0	0	0	123	0
West Bromwich Albion	1926–27	First Division	22	1	1	0	23	1
Career total			169	1	1	0	170	1

== Honours ==
Notts County

- Football League Second Division: 1922–23
