= David Dixon (footballer) =

English footballer

Personal information
- Date of birth: November 1898
- Place of birth: North Shields, England
- Place of death: Newcastle upon Tyne, England
- Height: 5 ft 7 3/4 in (1.72 m)
- Position: Right back

Senior career*
Years	Team	Apps	(Gls)
–	South Shields		
–	Preston Colliery		
1920–1925	Birmingham	4	(0)
1925–1926	Southend United	4	(0)
1926–1928	Rhyl Athletic		
1928–19??	Bedlington United		
- * Club domestic league appearances and goals

David P. Dixon (November 1898 – after 1930) was an English professional footballer who played in the Football League for Birmingham and for Southend United. He played as a right back.

Dixon was born in North Shields, which was then in Northumberland. He began his football career with South Shields and Preston Colliery before moving to Birmingham of the Second Division in May 1920. Dixon was always behind Frank Womack, Jack Jones and Eli Ashurst in the pecking order at full-back, and played only four league games in five seasons. He joined Southend United in May 1925, where again he played only four times in the Football League. He later played for Rhyl Athletic and Bedlington United, and retired from the game in 1931. He died in Newcastle upon Tyne.
