= Harry Bruce (footballer, born 1905) =

English footballer and manager

Personal information
- Full name: Henry Bruce
- Date of birth: May 1905
- Place of birth: Coundon, Bishop Auckland, England
- Place of death: Durham, England
- Height: 5 ft 9 1/4 in (1.76 m)
- Position: Defender

Senior career*
Years	Team	Apps	(Gls)
1922–192?	Durham City	0	(0)
–	Bishop Auckland		
1925–1928	Birmingham	8	(0)
1928–1929	Gillingham	30	(0)
1929–1930	Torquay United	28	(0)
1930–1931	Colwyn Bay United		
–	Bankhead Albion		
1931	Rochdale	2	(0)
1931	Darlington	0	(0)
1931	Bankhead Albion		
1931–19??	Reading	7	(0)
1934–1935	Macclesfield Town	90	(2)

Managerial career
- 1937–1939: Halmstads BK
- * Club domestic league appearances and goals

Henry Bruce (May 1905 – after 1939) was an English professional footballer who played in the Football League for Birmingham, Gillingham, Torquay United, Rochdale and Reading. He went on to manage Swedish club Halmstads BK.

== Football career ==
Bruce was born in Coundon, near Bishop Auckland in County Durham. He played for Durham City, though not in the Football League, and for Bishop Auckland before joining Birmingham in January 1925. He made his debut in the First Division on 2 February 1925, deputising at right half for George Liddell in an away game at Burnley which Birmingham lost 3–2. He spent three and a half years at the club, providing cover for all the defensive positions, before moving on to Gillingham of the Third Division South at the end of the 1927–28 season. He spent one season at Gillingham, playing 30 league games, followed by a season at Torquay United where he appeared 28 times in the league.

From July 1930 for the next 18 months or so, Bruce spent brief spells with a variety of clubs: Colwyn Bay United, Bankhead Albion back in his native north-east, Rochdale, where he played twice in the Third Division North in the 1930–31 season, Darlington, without appearing in the Football League, Bankhead Albion again, and finally Reading, where he played seven games in the Third Division South in 1931.

In 1937, he became the first non-Swedish manager of Halmstads BK, a post which he held until 1939. He retired from the game in 1939 or 1940.

Bruce died in Durham.
