= Ernie Islip =

English footballer

Personal information
- Full name: Ernest Islip
- Date of birth: 10 October 1892
- Place of birth: Sheffield, England
- Date of death: August 1941 (aged 48)
- Place of death: Huddersfield, England
- Height: 5 ft 8 in (1.73 m)
- Position: Forward

Senior career*
Years	Team	Apps	(Gls)
1910–1911	Sheffield Douglas		
1911–1923	Huddersfield Town	152	(44)
1923–1927	Birmingham	83	(23)
1927–1928	Bradford City	6	(1)
1928	Kidderminster Harriers		
1928	Ashton National		
1928–1929	Wrexham		
- * Club domestic league appearances and goals

Ernest Islip (10 October 1892 – August 1941) was an English professional footballer who played as a forward. He played for several years in the First Division of the Football League, and won the FA Cup with Huddersfield Town.

== Biography ==
Islip was born in Parkwood Springs, Sheffield. He began his football career with local club Sheffield Douglas F.C. before turning professional with Second Division Huddersfield Town in 1911. While at Huddersfield he contributed to the club gaining promotion from the Second Division in 1919–20, played in the 1920 FA Cup Final and again in 1922, this time on the winning side. He was the club's leading League scorer in the 1921–22 season.

Islip moved to Birmingham in November 1923 for a fee of £1,500, and in his first full season was joint leading scorer, but the prolific partnership between George Briggs and Joe Bradford left him on the sidelines. He moved on to Bradford City for a fee of £400 in 1927, spending one season there in the Third Division North. He had short spells at Kidderminster Harriers, Ashton National and Wrexham before retiring in 1929. Islip died in Huddersfield at the age of 48.

== Honours ==
Huddersfield Town

- FA Cup: 1921–22; runner-up: 1919–20
- FA Charity Shield: 1922
- Football League Second Division runner-up: 1919–20

Individual

- Huddersfield Town top scorer: 1922
- Birmingham top scorer: 1925
