= Jack Russell (footballer) =

English footballer and manager (1904–1995)

Personal information
- Full name: Cecil John Russell
- Date of birth: 19 June 1904
- Place of birth: Birmingham, England
- Date of death: 1995 (aged 90–91)
- Height: 5 ft 8 1/2 in (1.74 m)
- Position: Forward

Senior career*
| Years | Team | Apps | (Gls) |
- Northfield Institute
- Bournville Athletic
| 1923–1924 | Bromsgrove Rovers | 7 | (1) |
| 1924–1927 | Birmingham | 26 | (1) |
| 1927–1928 | Bristol Rovers | 22 | (6) |
| 1928–1930 | Worcester City | | |
| 1930–1934 | Bournemouth & Boscombe Athletic | 138 | (43) |
| 1934 | Luton Town | 8 | (1) |
| 1934–1936 | Norwich City | 56 | (23) |
| 1936–1937 | Worcester City | | |
| 1937–1940 | Shirley/Solihull Town | | |

Managerial career
- 1936–1937: Worcester City
- * Club domestic league appearances and goals

Cecil John Russell (19 June 1904 – 1995) was an English professional footballer who scored 74 goals in 250 appearances in the Football League playing for Birmingham, Bristol Rovers, Bournemouth & Boscombe Athletic, Luton Town and Norwich City. He played as a forward.

== Life and career ==
Russell was born in the Northfield district of Birmingham. He began his football career with local clubs, including Bournville Athletic and Bromsgrove Rovers of the Birmingham Combination, before joining Birmingham of the First Division in February 1924. He made his debut on 18 April 1924, in a 1–0 defeat at Manchester City, but apart from a run of a dozen games at outside left in the 1925–26 season, his Birmingham career consisted of occasional appearances as the replacement for an injured player. In the 1927 close season Russell joined Bristol Rovers. A year later he dropped back into non-league football with Worcester City, and after another two years returned to the Football League with Bournemouth & Boscombe Athletic of the Third Division South. For Bournemouth Russell scored goals at a rate approaching one every three games, and twice in a month scored four goals in a game, a club record. In May 1934 he signed for Luton Town, and five months later joined Norwich City. For the 1936–37 season, Russell returned to Worcester City as player-manager. He later played for Shirley Town, the club being renamed Solihull Town in 1939.

Russell died in 1995.
