= Wally Harris (English footballer) =

English footballer

Personal information
- Full name: Wallace Norman Harris
- Date of birth: 22 February 1900
- Place of birth: Birmingham, England
- Date of death: 7 September 1933 (aged 33)
- Place of death: Davos, Switzerland
- Height: 5 ft 6 in (1.68 m)
- Position: Outside right

Senior career*
Years	Team	Apps	(Gls)
–	Burton All Saints		
1922–1929	Birmingham	89	(12)
1929–1930	Walsall	6	(1)
- * Club domestic league appearances and goals

Wallace Norman Harris (22 February 1900 – 7 September 1933) was an English professional footballer. Born in Birmingham, he played as an outside right for Birmingham and Walsall in the Football League during the 1920s. Released by Birmingham due to health problems, he retired not long afterwards and died in a sanatorium in Davos, Switzerland, aged 33.
