= Eli Ashurst =

English footballer

Personal information
- Date of birth: 28 December 1901
- Place of birth: Willington, County Durham, England
- Date of death: 7 December 1927 (aged 25)
- Place of death: Willington, England
- Height: 5 ft 11 1/4 in (1.81 m)
- Position: Full back

Senior career*
| Years | Team | Apps | (Gls) |
| – | Willington | | |
| – | Ashington | | |
| 1919–1920 | Shildon Athletic | | |
| 1920–1922 | Stanley United | | |
| 1922–1926 | Birmingham | 66 | (1) |
- * Club domestic league appearances and goals

Elias A. "Eli" Ashurst (28 December 1901 – 7 December 1927) was an English professional footballer born in Willington, County Durham, who played as a fullback. He made 66 appearances in the First Division of the Football League for Birmingham in the 1920s.

Ashurst spent four seasons with Birmingham, retiring through poor health at the end of the 1925–26 season, and died in his native Willington the following year, aged only 25. His brother Bill was also a professional footballer who played for Notts County (among others) and for England.
