= Jimmy Cringan =

Scottish footballer

Personal information
- Full name: James Anderson Cringan
- Date of birth: 16 December 1904
- Place of birth: Douglas Water, Scotland
- Date of death: 1972 (aged 67–68)
- Height: 5 ft 9 in (1.75 m)
- Position: Wing half

Senior career*
Years	Team	Apps	(Gls)
- Douglas Water Thistle
1922–1934	Birmingham	261	(12)
1934–1936	Boston United	29	(3)

Managerial career
- 1934–1935: Boston United (player-manager)
- 1936–1961: Banbury Spencer
- * Club domestic league appearances and goals

James Anderson Cringan (16 December 1904 – 1972) was a Scottish professional footballer who played as a wing half. He played 285 games in all competitions for Birmingham, including 261 Football League First Division games and an appearance at Wembley in the 1931 FA Cup Final, before trying his hand at management.

He began his managerial career as player-manager at Midland League club Boston United, before becoming Banbury Spencer manager in 1936, a position he held until retiring in 1961.

Cringan died in 1972. He was the younger brother of Willie Cringan, captain of Celtic and Scotland. Another brother Robert played for Ayr United.

== Honours ==
Birmingham

- FA Cup runner-up: 1930–31
