= Bill Hunter (footballer, born 1900) =

Scottish footballer

Personal information
- Full name: William Hunter
- Date of birth: 16 August 1900
- Place of birth: Cardenden, Scotland
- Height: 5 ft 8 in (1.73 m)
- Positions: Centre half; left back

Senior career*
Years	Team	Apps	(Gls)
–	Bowhill Juniors		
1921–1927	Birmingham	41	(0)
1927	Grimsby Town	6	(0)
1927–1928	Coventry City	31	(1)
1928–1929	Walsall	10	(0)
1929–1930	Torquay United	6	(0)
- * Club domestic league appearances and goals

William Hunter (16 August 1900 – after 1929) was a Scottish professional footballer who played as a centre half or left back.

Born in Cardenden, Fife, Hunter began his football career with local club Bowhill Juniors before turning professional with Birmingham in 1921. He never established himself as a first-team player with the club, but was a mainstay of the reserve team and performed solidly when given a game in the First Division. He joined Grimsby Town in early 1927, spending only a few months with the club and making just six appearances before returning to the Midlands to sign for Coventry City. The following year he moved to Walsall, and in late 1929 moved on again, this time to Torquay United, before retiring at the end of the 1929–30 season.

He was nicknamed "Sailor", because of his service in the Royal Navy in the First World War.
