= Ted Linley (footballer) =

English footballer

Personal information
- Date of birth: 26 September 1894
- Place of birth: East Retford, England
- Height: 5 ft 5 1/2 in (1.66 m)
- Position: Outside left

Senior career*
| Years | Team | Apps | (Gls) |
- Kiveton Park
| 19??–1920 | Worksop Town | | |
| 1920–1926 | Birmingham | 113 | (11) |
| 1926–1927 | Nottingham Forest | 29 | (5) |
| 1927–1928 | Sutton Town | | |
| 1928–19?? | Mansfield Town | | |
- Shirebrook
- * Club domestic league appearances and goals

Edward A. Linley (26 September 1894 – after 1928) was an English professional footballer who made 142 appearances in the Football League playing as an outside left.

Linley was born in East Retford, Nottinghamshire. He played football for Kiveton Park and Midland League club Worksop Town before signing for Birmingham in December 1920 for a fee reported as £600. He helped them win the Football League Second Division title in the 1920–21 season and appeared in more than 100 top-flight matches for the club. He also played for Nottingham Forest, Sutton Town, Mansfield Town, and Shirebrook.
