= Jack Jones (footballer, born 1891) =

English footballer

Personal information
- Full name: John William Jones
- Date of birth: 8 February 1891
- Place of birth: Rotherham, England
- Date of death: 20 July 1948 (aged 57)
- Place of death: Rotherham, England
- Height: 5 ft 6 in (1.68 m)
- Position: Left back

Senior career*
| Years | Team | Apps | (Gls) |
- Allerton Bywater Colliery
- Industry F.C.
- Bird-in-Hand
- Maltby Main Colliery
- RAF
| 1914–1920 | Sunderland | 0 | (0) |
| 1920–1927 | Birmingham | 228 | (1) |
| 1927–1928 | Nelson | 12 | (0) |
| 1928–1930 | Crewe Alexandra | 91 | (7) |
| 1930–1931 | Scarborough | | |
- * Club domestic league appearances and goals

John William Jones (8 February 1891 – 20 July 1948) was an English professional footballer who played as a left back. He made 331 appearances in the Football League.

Jones was born in 1891 in Rotherham, which was then in the West Riding of Yorkshire. A former coal miner, he was transferred from Sunderland to Birmingham in 1920 for a fee of £2,000. For six seasons he formed a formidable full-back pairing with Frank Womack, helping the club win the Football League Second Division title in the 1920–21 season. He went on to play 237 matches in all competitions for the club, including 191 in the First Division. He later played for Nelson, Crewe Alexandra and Scarborough. He died in Rotherham at the age of 57.
