= Johnny Crosbie =

Scottish footballer

Personal information
- Full name: John Crosbie
- Date of birth: 9 October 1895
- Place of birth: Glenbuck, Scotland
- Date of death: 1 February 1982 (aged 86)
- Place of death: Ayr, Scotland
- Height: 5 ft 7 3/4 in (1.72 m)
- Position: Inside forward

Youth career
- Glenbuck Cherrypickers
- Muirkirk Athletic

Senior career*
Years	Team	Apps	(Gls)
–1913	Saltcoats Victoria		
1913–1920	Ayr United	157	(45)
	→ Clyde (guest)	1	(0)
1920–1932	Birmingham	409	(71)
1932–1933	Chesterfield	3	(0)
- Stourbridge
Total		569	(116)

International career
1919	Scotland (wartime)	1	(0)
1920–1922	Scotland	2	(0)
- * Club domestic league appearances and goals

John Crosbie (9 October 1895 – 1 February 1982) was a Scottish professional footballer who played as an inside forward in the Scottish Football League for Ayr United and made more than 400 appearances in the Football League for Birmingham. He was capped twice for the Scotland national football team.

== Career ==
As a youth Crosbie played for several clubs in his local Ayrshire area, including the Glenbuck Cherrypickers club which produced many Scottish footballers.

In July 1913, Crosbie signed for Ayr United. When the First World War put a temporary halt to his football career, he volunteered for the Lanarkshire Yeomanry. Ayr's board of directors agreed to keep him on half pay for the duration of his military service. After the war Crosbie returned to play for Ayr United (his brother William also played for the club for two seasons). He won his first full cap for Scotland in 1920 against Wales at Ninian Park, Cardiff. In May of that year he signed for Birmingham for a club record fee of £3,700.

Crosbie played a great part in Birmingham's winning the Second Division championship in the 1920–21 season, playing in every game and creating numerous goals. The following season, he won his second and last cap for Scotland, in a 1–0 win against England at Villa Park, Birmingham. He formed an excellent understanding with Joe Bradford, Birmingham's leading scorer throughout the 1920s. He set up Bradford's goal in the 1931 FA Cup Final, but this was not enough to give his side victory.

After finishing with football, he returned to Scotland and settled in Ayr, where he died in February 1982 aged 86.

== Honours ==
Birmingham

- Football League Second Division: 1920–21
- FA Cup runner-up: 1930–31
