= Dan Tremelling =

English footballer

Personal information
- Full name: Richard Daniel Tremelling
- Date of birth: 12 November 1897
- Place of birth: Newhall, Derbyshire, England
- Date of death: 15 August 1970 (aged 72)
- Place of death: Birmingham, England
- Height: 5 ft 9 in (1.75 m)
- Position: Goalkeeper

Youth career
- –: Langwith Colliery Junction Wagon Works
- –: Shirebrook Juniors

Senior career*
Years	Team	Apps	(Gls)
–	Mansfield Town		
1918–1919	Lincoln City	0	(0)
1919–1932	Birmingham	382	(0)
1932–1936	Bury	57	(0)
Total		439	(0)

International career
1927	England	1	(0)
- * Club domestic league appearances and goals

Richard Daniel Tremelling (12 November 1897 – 15 August 1970) was an English professional footballer who played as a goalkeeper. He made nearly 450 appearances in the Football League for Birmingham and Bury, including more than 300 in the First Division, and was capped for England.

== Family ==
His brothers Sol and Billy were also footballers, as was a fourth brother, Jack. His nephew Arthur (son of Sol) was also a footballer.

== Playing career ==
Tremelling was born in Newhall, Derbyshire. He first played for his local team, Langwith Colliery Junction Wagon Works, as a full back, but went in goal when they were hit by injuries. He played for Mansfield Town, and appeared for Lincoln City in wartime competition, but moved to Birmingham before league football resumed after the First World War. He went straight in as first choice goalkeeper, and remained so for eleven seasons, until Harry Hibbs took over in the 1929–30 season.

He played a key role in the destination of the First Division title on the final day of the 1923–24 season. His Birmingham City side faced Cardiff City who needed a win to take the title. Cardiff were awarded a penalty but Tremelling saved Len Davies' penalty kick as the match finished 0–0, ensuring that Herbert Chapman's Huddersfield Town won the title by 0.024 of a goal.

He won his only full cap for England on 28 November 1927, in a 2–1 defeat to Wales played at Turf Moor, Burnley. He moved to Bury in May 1932, but returned to Birmingham in June 1936 as assistant trainer, a position which he held for five years.

After retiring from football he went into the licensed trade, at the Old Lodge Hotel in Birmingham.

== Honours ==
Birmingham

- Football League Second Division champions: 1920–21
