= George Liddell (footballer) =

English footballer (1895–?)

Personal information
- Date of birth: 14 July 1895
- Place of birth: Murton, County Durham, England
- Height: 5 ft 8 in (1.73 m)
- Positions: Wing half; full-back

Youth career
- City of Leeds Training College
- Honourable Artillery Company
- Duke of Wellington

Senior career*
Years	Team	Apps	(Gls)
- Yorkshire Amateur
19??–1920	South Shields		
1920–1932	Birmingham	323	(6)

Managerial career
- 1933–1939: Birmingham
- * Club domestic league appearances and goals

George Liddell (14 July 1895 – after 1962) was an English professional football player and manager.

== Life and career ==
Liddell was born in Murton, County Durham, the youngest of five siblings. Upon marrying Charlotte Anderson he changed his family name from Liddle to Liddell. He played football for Yorkshire Amateur and as an amateur for South Shields, then turned professional when he moved to Birmingham in 1920. He spent the whole twelve years of his professional playing career at the club, for whom he made 345 appearances as wing half or full back in all competitions, and played in the 1931 FA Cup Final. He was described as a powerful defender who read the game well and was positive on the ball.

When manager Leslie Knighton left Birmingham for Chelsea in 1933, Liddell succeeded him. He remained in charge while the club retained their top-flight status, leaving the job at the end of the 1938–39 season when the club were relegated. During his six-year tenure he selected 70 different players for first team duty.

A trained teacher, Liddell whilst continuing his football career as both player and manager also taught at several schools in the Birmingham area, including Handsworth New Road Secondary Modern School where he was head teacher in the early 1950s.

Liddell also was a part-time journalist writing a sports column for a Birmingham newspaper.

== Honours ==
Birmingham

- FA Cup runner-up: 1930–31
