= Joe Bradford =

English footballer

- Bradford in c1930

Personal information
- Full name: Joseph Bradford
- Date of birth: 22 January 1901
- Place of birth: Peggs Green, Coalville, England
- Date of death: 6 September 1980 (aged 79)
- Place of death: Birmingham, England
- Height: 5 ft 9 1/2 in (1.77 m)
- Position: Centre forward

Senior career*
Years	Team	Apps	(Gls)
–	Coalville Town		
–	Peggs Green Victoria		
1920–1935	Birmingham	414	(249)
1935–1936	Bristol City	5	(1)
Total		419	(250)

International career
1923–1930	England	12	(7)
- * Club domestic league appearances and goals

Joseph Bradford (22 January 1901 – 6 September 1980) was an English footballer who played as a centre forward. He spent the majority of his career with Birmingham, and remains the club's all-time leading goalscorer with 267 goals from 445 appearances in all competitions. Bradford also played 12 times for England, scoring seven goals.

== Early life ==
Bradford was born in Peggs Green, Leicestershire. He played football for Coalville Town and Peggs Green Victoria before being noticed by larger clubs. He had trials with Derby County and Aston Villa before signing for Birmingham in February 1920 for a fee of £100, with an additional £25 payable upon making his first-team debut.

== Club career ==
=== Birmingham ===
Bradford made his first-team debut for Birmingham on Christmas Day 1920 and scored in a 1–1 draw away to West Ham United. He played three more league matches that season as the club won promotion to the Football League First Division. Over the next 15 seasons, he became Birmingham's all-time leading goalscorer, topped the club's scoring charts in all but one First Division season between 1921–22 and 1932–33, and if goals in all competitions are counted, he was top scorer in all twelve of those seasons.

Bradford helped the team reach the 1931 FA Cup Final, and scored Birmingham's only goal as they lost 2–1 to West Bromwich Albion. He remains the club's all-time leading goalscorer, with 267 goals in 445 league matches.

=== Bristol City ===
In 1935, Bradford had a stint at Bristol City, who were playing in the Football League Third Division. He made just five appearances and scored one goal before retiring from professional football in 1936.

== International career ==
Bradford made his debut for England on 20 October 1923 in a British Home Championship match against Ireland. He went on to earn 12 caps between 1923 and 1930, scoring seven goals. He also played five times for a representative Football League XI, for which he once scored five goals in a match against the Irish League XI.

== After football ==
After retiring, Bradford ran several public houses in the West Midlands, including the White Lion in Muntz St, Birmingham, the Stockland Inn in Erdington and the Vernon Arms in Hanbury. Later, he co-owned a sports shop in Sutton Coldfield with former Aston Villa player Eric Houghton. He briefly worked as a scout for Arsenal in the 1946–47 season.

Bradford died in Birmingham on 6 September 1980 at the age of 79.

== Honours ==
Birmingham

- FA Cup runner-up: 1930–31
