= George Briggs (footballer) =

English footballer

Personal information
- Full name: George Richard Briggs
- Date of birth: 3 May 1903
- Place of birth: Wombwell, Barnsley, England
- Date of death: March qtr 1972 (aged 68)
- Place of death: Birmingham, England
- Height: 5 ft 6 1/2 in (1.69 m)
- Positions: Forward; outside right

Youth career
- Mitchell's Main Colliery
- –1922: Ardsley Athletic

Senior career*
Years	Team	Apps	(Gls)
1922–1923	Wombwell		
1923	Denaby United		
1923–1933	Birmingham	298	(98)
1933–1936	Plymouth Argyle	58	(11)
1936–1937	St Austell		
- * Club domestic league appearances and goals

George Richard Briggs (3 May 1903 – 1972) was an English professional footballer who played in the Football League as a forward or outside right for Birmingham and Plymouth Argyle.

Formerly a coal-miner, Briggs joined First Division Birmingham from Midland League Denaby United in December 1923. In 1924–25, his first full season at the club, he was joint top scorer. He was used in all forward positions before settling as an outside-right, the position in which he played in the 1931 FA Cup Final defeat. In all he made 324 appearances for Birmingham and scored 107 goals, which ranks him fourth in the club's all-time top scorers table. In 1933 he moved to Plymouth Argyle, where he spent three seasons.

He was twice called up as reserve to the England team, in 1926 and 1928, but never played.

He died in his adopted city of Birmingham.

== Honours ==
Birmingham

- FA Cup runner-up: 1930–31
