= 1934–35 Birmingham F.C. season =

Birmingham F.C.
1934–35 season
- Chairman: Howard Cant
- Manager: George Liddell
- Ground: St Andrew's
- Football League First Division: 19th
- FA Cup: Sixth round (eliminated by Burnley)
- Top goalscorer: League: Charlie Wilson Jones (16); All: Charlie Wilson Jones (17)
- Highest home attendance: 53,930 vs Aston Villa, 25 August 1934
- Lowest home attendance: 5,729 vs Middlesbrough, 6 February 1935
- Average home league attendance: 21,790
Home colours

The 1934–35 Football League season was Birmingham Football Club's 39th in the Football League and their 22nd in the First Division. They finished in 19th position in the 22-team division, three points clear of the relegation places. They also competed in the 1934–35 FA Cup, entering at the third round proper and losing to Burnley in the sixth (quarter-final).

Thirty players made at least one appearance in nationally organised competition, and there were twelve different goalscorers. Half-backs Charlie Calladine and Lewis Stoker made 42 and 41 appearances respectively over the 46-match season, and Charlie Wilson Jones was leading scorer with 17 goals, of which 16 came in the league; Frank White scored one fewer.

Joe Bradford made his 445th and last competitive appearance for Birmingham on 7 May 1935, the final game of this season, at home to Everton. He spent 15 years with the club, was their top scorer for 12 consecutive seasons, and holds (as of 2012) club records for League goals scored (249), goals scored in all competitions (267), and goals scored in a top-flight season (29). While a Birmingham player, Bradford won 12 caps for England, scoring 7 goals.

== Football League First Division ==
Date	League position	Opponents	Venue	Result	Score F–A	Scorers	Attendance
25 August 1934	6th	Aston Villa	H	W	2–1	Harris, Guest	53,930
29 August 1934	3rd	West Bromwich Albion	A	W	2–1	Sandford og, Bradford	22,052
1 September 1934	8th	Stoke City	A	L	0–2		29,649
3 September 1934	9th	West Bromwich Albion	H	L	1–2	White	22,074
8 September 1934	15th	Manchester City	H	L	1–3	Mangnall	24,895
15 September 1934	12th	Middlesbrough	A	W	1–0	Bradford	15,477
22 September 1934	9th	Blackburn Rovers	H	W	1–0	White	11,802
29 September 1934	13th	Arsenal	A	L	1–5	White	47,868
6 October 1934	10th	Portsmouth	H	W	2–1	Mangnall 2	20,916
13 October 1934	10th	Liverpool	A	L	4–5	Booton pen, Mangnall 3	21,491
20 October 1934	13th	Chelsea	H	L	0–1		22,572
27 October 1934	17th	Wolverhampton Wanderers	A	L	1–3	Mangnall	22,406
3 November 1934	19th	Leicester City	H	L	2–3	C.W. Jones 2	16,799
10 November 1934	17th	Derby County	A	D	1–1	Guest	20,077
17 November 1934	17th	Grimsby Town	H	W	3–2	C.W. Jones 2, Guest	18,604
24 November 1934	15th	Preston North End	A	W	1–0	Roberts	17,655
1 December 1934	11th	Tottenham Hotspur	H	W	2–1	C.W. Jones, Guest	20,546
8 December 1934	15th	Sunderland	A	L	1–5	Barkas pen	22,002
15 December 1934	16th	Huddersfield Town	H	L	0–4		16,569
22 December 1934	17th	Everton	A	L	0–2		20,148
25 December 1934	20th	Sheffield Wednesday	A	L	1–2	Mangnall	23,496
26 December 1934	20th	Sheffield Wednesday	H	L	0–4		24,499
29 December 1934	18th	Aston Villa	A	D	2–2	Mangnall 2	40,785
5 January 1935	20th	Stoke City	H	D	0–0		22,614
19 January 1935	20th	Manchester City	A	D	0–0		31,644
2 February 1935	20th	Blackburn Rovers	A	L	1–3	Harris	12,297
6 February 1935	19th	Middlesbrough	H	W	4–2	C.W. Jones 2, White 2	5,729
9 February 1935	17th	Arsenal	H	W	3–0	C.W. Jones, Bradford, Harris	50,188
23 February 1935	20th	Liverpool	H	L	1–3	Harris	22,035
6 March 1935	20th	Chelsea	A	D	2–2	Guest, Harris	13,016
9 March 1935	20th	Wolverhampton Wanderers	H	D	1–1	C.W. Jones	19,928
16 March 1935	20th	Leicester City	A	L	1–2	Stoker	18,540
23 March 1935	20th	Derby County	H	W	3–2	C.W. Jones 3	11,627
30 March 1935	20th	Grimsby Town	A	L	3–4	White 2 (1 pen), Bradford	9,837
6 April 1935	20th	Preston North End	H	W	3–0	White 3 (1 pen)	15,773
10 April 1935	20th	Portsmouth	A	L	1–2	White	8,621
13 April 1935	20th	Tottenham Hotspur	A	D	1–1	C.W. Jones	27,190
19 April 1935	19th	Leeds United	A	D	1–1	C.W. Jones	14,786
20 April 1935	19th	Sunderland	H	D	2–2	White, C.W. Jones	21,841
22 April 1935	18th	Leeds United	H	W	3–1	Calladine, Harris 2	18,008
27 April 1935	19th	Huddersfield Town	A	D	2–2	Harris 2	9,119
7 May 1935	19th	Everton	H	L	2–3	White, C.W. Jones	16,634

=== League table (part) ===
Final First Division table (part)
Pos	Club	Pld	W	D	L	F	A	GA	Pts
17th	Wolverhampton Wanderers	42	15	8	19	88	94	0.94	38
18th	Leeds United	42	13	12	17	75	92	0.81	38
19th	Birmingham	42	13	10	19	63	81	0.78	36
20th	Middlesbrough	42	10	14	18	70	90	0.78	34
21st	Leicester City	42	12	9	21	61	86	0.71	33
Key	Pos = League position; Pld = Matches played; W = Matches won; D = Matches drawn; L = Matches lost; F = Goals for; A = Goals against; GA = Goal average; Pts = Points								
Source									

== FA Cup ==
Round	Date	Opponents	Venue	Result	Score F–A	Scorers	Attendance
3rd	12 January 1935	Coventry City	H	W	5–1	Harris 3, Mangnall, Guest	40,349
4th	23 January 1935	Southampton	A	W	3–0	White, Fillingham, Guest	28,291
5th	21 February 1935	Blackburn Rovers	A	W	2–1	Whiteside og, White	35,000
6th	6 March 1935	Burnley	A	L	2–3	C.W. Jones, White	47,670

== Appearances and goals ==
This table includes appearances and goals in nationally organised competitive matches – the Football League and FA Cup – only.
For a description of the playing positions, see Formation (association football)#2–3–5 (Pyramid).
Players marked † left the club during the playing season.

Players' appearances and goals by competition
Name	Position	League		FA Cup		Total	
Name	Position	Apps	Goals	Apps	Goals	Apps	Goals
Frank Clack	Goalkeeper	9	0	0	0	9	0
Harry Hibbs	Goalkeeper	33	0	4	0	37	0
Ned Barkas	Full back	30	1	4	0	34	1
Harold Booton	Full back	33	1	4	0	37	1
Arthur Hubbard	Full back	5	0	0	0	5	0
Bernard Smith	Full back	1	0	0	0	1	0
Willie Steel	Full back	11	0	0	0	11	0
Charlie Calladine	Half back	38	1	4	0	42	1
Ray Crawshaw	Half back	4	0	0	0	4	0
Tom Fillingham	Half back	17	0	4	1	21	1
Isaac Lea	Half back	9	0	0	0	9	0
George Morrall	Half back	26	0	0	0	26	0
Lewis Stoker	Half back	37	1	4	0	41	1
Joe Bradford	Forward	15	4	4	0	19	4
Don Dearson	Forward	4	0	0	0	4	0
Joe Devine	Forward	14	0	0	0	14	0
Tom Grosvenor	Forward	8	0	0	0	8	0
Billy Guest	Forward	27	5	4	2	31	7
Fred Harris	Forward	30	9	4	3	34	12
Harry Holmes	Forward	1	0	0	0	1	0
Bill Horsman	Forward	10	0	0	0	10	0
Fred Jones	Forward	1	0	0	0	1	0
Charlie Wilson Jones	Forward	25	16	2	1	27	17
Dave Mangnall †	Forward	25	10	2	1	27	11
Francis McGurk	Forward	1	0	0	0	1	0
Sid Moffat	Forward	10	0	0	0	10	0
Seymour Morris	Forward	3	0	0	0	3	0
Fred Roberts †	Forward	1	1	0	0	1	1
Sam Small	Forward	2	0	0	0	2	0
Frank White	Forward	32	13	4	3	36	16

== See also ==
- Birmingham City F.C. seasons
