= 1935–36 Birmingham F.C. season =

Birmingham City F.C.
1935–36 season
- Chairman: Howard Cant
- Manager: George Liddell
- Ground: St Andrew's
- Football League First Division: 12th
- FA Cup: Third round (eliminated by Barnsley)
- Top goalscorer: League: Charlie Wilson Jones (19); All: Charlie Wilson Jones (20)
- Highest home attendance: 60,250 vs Aston Villa, 23 November 1935
- Lowest home attendance: 9,089 vs Sheffield Wednesday, 22 April 1936
- Average home league attendance: 21,795
Home colours

The 1935–36 Football League season was Birmingham Football Club's 40th season overall in the Football League and their 23rd consecutive season in the First Division. They finished in 12th position in the 22-team division. They entered the 1935–36 FA Cup at the third round proper and lost to Barnsley in that round after a replay.

Twenty-seven players made at least one appearance in nationally organised competition, and there were fourteen different goalscorers. Forward Fred Harris was ever-present for the 44-match season, and Charlie Wilson Jones was leading scorer with 20 goals, of which 19 came in the league.

== Football League First Division ==
Date	League position	Opponents	Venue	Result	Score F–A	Scorers	Attendance
31 August 1935	15th	Wolverhampton Wanderers	A	L	1–3	Harris	33,457
4 September 1935	18th	Leeds United	A	D	0–0		13,271
7 September 1935	16th	Arsenal	H	D	1–1	Devine	42,804
11 September 1935	12th	Leeds United	H	W	2–0	Jones, White	14,298
14 September 1935	15th	Manchester City	A	L	1–3	Guest	32,337
18 September 1935	16th	West Bromwich Albion	A	D	0–0		18,049
21 September 1935	17th	Stoke City	H	L	0–5		19,901
28 September 1935	15th	Blackburn Rovers	A	W	2–1	Jones, Harris	13,177
5 October 1935	11th	Chelsea	H	W	2–1	Harris, Craig og	22,625
12 October 1935	9th	Liverpool	A	W	2–1	Harris, Jones	28,994
19 October 1935	9th	Sheffield Wednesday	A	L	1–3	White	13,479
26 October 1935	9th	Portsmouth	H	W	4–0	White, Harris 2, Jones	24,455
2 November 1935	10th	Preston North End	A	L	1–3	Harris	16,232
9 November 1935	8th	Brentford	H	W	2–1	Jones, Stoker	28,673
16 November 1935	7th	Derby County	A	D	2–2	Jones 2, Guest	23,893
23 November 1935	7th	Aston Villa	H	D	2–2	Calladine, Harris	60,250
30 November 1935	10th	Bolton Wanderers	A	L	0–2		21,684
7 December 1935	8th	Huddersfield Town	H	W	4–1	Jones 2, White, Guest	21,634
14 December 1935	5th	Middlesbrough	A	W	2–0	Jones 2	15,061
21 December 1935	5th	Everton	H	W	4–2	Jones og, Harris, White, Loughran	16,994
25 December 1935	6th	Grimsby Town	A	L	0–1		11,810
26 December 1935	7th	Grimsby Town	H	D	1–1	Guest	28,978
28 December 1935	5th	Wolverhampton Wanderers	H	D	0–0		37,870
4 January 1936	6th	Arsenal	A	D	1–1	Jones	44,534
18 January 1936	8th	Manchester City	H	L	0–1		23,165
1 February 1936	5th	Blackburn Rovers	H	W	4–2	Guest, Harris 2, Jennings	23,684
6 February 1936	6th	Stoke City	A	L	1–3	Jones	11,585
8 February 1936	6th	Chelsea	A	D	0–0		30,268
15 February 1936	6th	Liverpool	H	W	2–0	Jones, Harris	21,807
29 February 1936	5th	Brentford	A	W	1–0	Harris	20,523
7 March 1936	6th	Bolton Wanderers	H	D	0–0		20,170
14 March 1936	5th	Portsmouth	A	W	3–0	Harris, Morris 2	15,842
21 March 1936	5th	Derby County	H	L	2–3	Jones, Barkas pen	25,509
28 March 1936	7th	Aston Villa	A	L	1–2	Fillingham	49,531
4 April 1936	8th	Preston North End	H	D	0–0		15,811
10 April 1936	9th	Sunderland	A	L	1–2	Harris	40,660
11 April 1936	10th	Huddersfield Town	A	L	0–1		9,753
13 April 1936	11th	Sunderland	H	L	2–7	Loughran, Clarke	21,693
18 April 1936	10th	Middlesbrough	H	W	1–0	Harris	17,072
22 April 1936	9th	Sheffield Wednesday	H	W	4–1	Jones 3, Harris	9,089
25 April 1936	9th	Everton	A	L	3–4	Jones, Guest, Dearson	18,323
2 May 1936	12th	West Bromwich Albion	H	L	1–3	Barkas pen	18,312

=== League table (part) ===
Final First Division table (part)
Pos	Club	Pld	W	D	L	F	A	GA	Pts
10th	Portsmouth	42	17	8	17	54	67	0.81	42
11th	Leeds United	42	15	11	16	66	64	1.03	41
12th	Birmingham	42	15	11	16	61	63	0.97	41
13th	Bolton Wanderers	42	14	13	15	67	76	0.88	41
14th	Middlesbrough	42	15	10	17	84	70	1.20	40
Key	Pos = League position; Pld = Matches played; W = Matches won; D = Matches drawn; L = Matches lost; F = Goals for; A = Goals against; GA = Goal average; Pts = Points								
Source									

== FA Cup ==
Round	Date	Opponents	Venue	Result	Score F–A	Scorers	Attendance
Third round	11 January 1936	Barnsley	A	D	3–3	White, Jones, Harris	29,330
Third round replay	15 January 1936	Barnsley	H	L	0–2		34,000

== Appearances and goals ==
This table includes appearances and goals in nationally organised competitive matches – the Football League and FA Cup – only.
For a description of the playing positions, see Formation (association football)#2–3–5 (Pyramid).
Players marked † left the club during the playing season.

Players' appearances and goals by competition
Name	Position	League		FA Cup		Total	
Name	Position	Apps	Goals	Apps	Goals	Apps	Goals
Frank Clack	Goalkeeper	7	0	1	0	8	0
Harry Hibbs	Goalkeeper	35	0	1	0	36	0
Ned Barkas	Full back	32	2	2	0	34	2
Harold Booton †	Full back	7	0	0	0	7	0
Billy Hughes	Full back	4	0	1	0	5	0
Willie Steel	Full back	36	0	1	0	37	0
Cyril Trigg	Full back	4	0	0	0	4	0
Charlie Calladine †	Half back	9	1	0	0	9	1
Tom Fillingham	Half back	24	1	2	0	26	1
Isaac Lea	Half back	1	0	0	0	1	0
Joe Loughran	Half back	23	2	2	0	25	2
George Morrall	Half back	17	0	0	0	17	0
Jim Olney	Half back	1	0	0	0	1	0
Lewis Stoker	Half back	38	1	2	0	40	1
Jack Sykes	Half back	15	0	0	0	15	0
Albert Clarke	Forward	3	1	0	0	3	1
Don Dearson	Forward	6	1	0	0	6	1
Joe Devine	Forward	24	1	1	0	25	1
Tom Grosvenor †	Forward	14	0	1	0	15	0
Billy Guest	Forward	30	5	2	0	32	5
Fred Harris	Forward	42	17	2	1	44	18
Dennis Jennings	Forward	18	1	0	0	19	1
Charlie Wilson Jones	Forward	39	19	2	1	41	20
Seymour Morris	Forward	9	2	0	0	9	2
Ernie Richardson	Forward	1	0	0	0	1	0
Sam Small	Forward	1	0	0	0	1	0
Frank White	Forward	22	5	2	1	24	6

== See also ==
- Birmingham City F.C. seasons
