= 1933–34 Birmingham F.C. season =

Birmingham F.C.
1933–34 season
- Chairman: Howard Cant
- Manager: George Liddell
- Ground: St Andrew's
- Football League First Division: 20th
- FA Cup: Fifth round (eliminated by Leicester City)
- Top goalscorer: League: Fred Roberts (8); All: Fred Roberts (8)
- Highest home attendance: 48,561 vs Leicester City, 17 February 1934
- Lowest home attendance: 7,846 vs Leicester City, 28 March 1934
- Average home league attendance: 22,197
Home colours

The 1933–34 Football League season was Birmingham Football Club's 38th in the Football League and their 21st in the First Division. They finished in 20th position in the 22-team division, two points above the relegation places. They also competed in the 1933–34 FA Cup, entering at the third round proper and losing to Leicester City in the fifth.

Twenty-nine players made at least one appearance in nationally organised competition, and there were nineteen different goalscorers. Half-backs Charlie Calladine was ever-present over the 45-match season, and Fred Roberts was leading scorer with just 8 goals, all of which came in the league.

At the end of the 1932–33 season, Leslie Knighton left the club to become manager of Chelsea, who had made him an offer that Birmingham were unable to match. Former Birmingham defender George Liddell, a schoolteacher by profession, was appointed to succeed him. Liddell kept up his Saturday evening radio broadcast, This Week's Sport in the Midlands, but only on days when Birmingham were not playing away from home.

== Football League First Division ==
Date	League position	Opponents	Venue	Result	Score F–A	Scorers	Attendance
26 August 1933	11th	Arsenal	A	D	1–1	Bradford	44,662
30 August 1933	17th	Manchester City	H	L	0–1		20,084
2 September 1933	16th	Everton	H	D	2–2	Haywood, Grosvenor	25,250
6 September 1933	20th	Manchester City	A	L	0–1		19,388
9 September 1933	13th	Middlesbrough	A	W	3–0	Horsman, Bradford 2	11,501
16 September 1933	9th	Blackburn Rovers	H	W	2–0	Smith, Curtis pen	20,779
23 September 1933	8th	Newcastle United	A	D	0–0		21,667
30 September 1933	4th	Leeds United	H	W	4–0	Bradford, Grosvenor, Smith, Curtis	21,566
7 October 1933	12th	Derby County	A	L	0–4		17,400
14 October 1933	17th	West Bromwich Albion	H	L	0–1		29,961
21 October 1933	15th	Wolverhampton Wanderers	H	D	0–0		31,980
28 October 1933	15th	Stoke City	A	D	1–1	Roberts	17,668
4 November 1933	17th	Liverpool	H	L	1–2	Roberts	17,998
11 November 1933	12th	Portsmouth	A	W	2–0	White, Fillingham	16,962
15 November 1933	13th	Sunderland	H	D	1–1	Lea	15,277
25 November 1933	13th	Chelsea	A	D	1–1	White	17,843
2 December 1933	12th	Aston Villa	H	D	0–0		34,718
9 December 1933	14th	Tottenham Hotspur	A	L	2–3	Roberts, White	26,142
23 December 1933	17th	Huddersfield Town	A	D	0–0		9,777
25 December 1933	18th	Sheffield United	A	L	1–2	Roberts	25,637
26 December 1933	16th	Sheffield United	H	W	4–2	White, Robertson, Roberts, Bradford	28,904
30 December 1933	16th	Arsenal	H	D	0–0		34,771
2 January 1934	17th	Sheffield Wednesday	A	L	1–2	McGurk	12,754
6 January 1934	17th	Everton	A	L	0–2		20,582
20 January 1934	17th	Middlesbrough	H	D	0–0		20,310
29 January 1934	18th	Blackburn Rovers	A	L	1–3	McGurk	5,949
3 February 1934	19th	Newcastle United	H	L	1–2	McGurk	16,366
10 February 1934	20th	Leeds United	A	L	0–1		14,753
21 February 1934	18th	Derby County	H	W	2–1	Smith, Mangnall	12,396
24 February 1934	19th	West Bromwich Albion	A	W	2–1	Roberts, White	24,525
3 March 1934	20th	Wolverhampton Wanderers	A	L	0–2		27,350
10 March 1934	20th	Stoke City	H	L	0–1		21,968
17 March 1934	21st	Liverpool	A	L	1–4	Moffat	30,536
24 March 1934	20th	Portsmouth	H	W	3–1	Barkas pen, Guest, Mangnall	13,479
28 March 1934	19th	Leicester City	H	W	3–0	Sharman og, Moffat, Mangnall	7,846
31 March 1934	20th	Sunderland	A	L	1–4	Booton pen	14,158
3 April 1934	19th	Sheffield Wednesday	H	W	3–0	Catlin og, Roberts, Guest	24,021
7 April 1934	21st	Chelsea	H	L	0–3		29,104
14 April 1934	20th	Aston Villa	A	D	1–1	Calladine	34,196
21 April 1934	19th	Tottenham Hotspur	H	W	2–0	Whatley og, Calladine	24,576
28 April 1934	18th	Leicester City	A	W	7–3	Moffat, Guest 3, Mangnall, Roberts, Jones og	16,981
5 May 1934	20th	Huddersfield Town	H	L	1–3	Barkas pen	14,785

=== League table (part) ===
Final First Division table (part)
Pos	Club	Pld	W	D	L	F	A	GA	Pts
18th	Liverpool	42	14	10	18	79	87	0.91	38
19th	Chelsea	42	14	8	20	67	69	0.97	36
20th	Birmingham	42	12	12	18	54	56	0.96	36
21st	Newcastle United	42	10	14	18	68	77	0.88	34
22nd	Sheffield United	42	12	7	23	58	101	0.57	31
Key	Pos = League position; Pld = Matches played; W = Matches won; D = Matches drawn; L = Matches lost; F = Goals for; A = Goals against; GA = Goal average; Pts = Points								
Source									

== FA Cup ==
Round	Date	Opponents	Venue	Result	Score F–A	Scorers	Attendance
Third round	13 January 1934	Sheffield United	H	W	2–1	Robertson, Haywood	33,177
Fourth round	27 January 1934	Charlton Athletic	H	W	1–0	Morrall	30,203
Fifth round	17 February 1934	Leicester City	H	L	1–2	Haywood	48,561

== Appearances and goals ==
This table includes appearances and goals in nationally organised competitive matches – the Football League and FA Cup – only.
For a description of the playing positions, see Formation (association football)#2–3–5 (Pyramid).
Players marked † left the club during the playing season.

Players' appearances and goals by competition
Name	Position	League		FA Cup		Total	
Name	Position	Apps	Goals	Apps	Goals	Apps	Goals
Frank Clack	Goalkeeper	9	0	1	0	10	0
Len Evans	Goalkeeper	2	0	0	0	2	0
Harry Hibbs	Goalkeeper	31	0	2	0	33	0
Ned Barkas	Full back	36	2	3	0	39	2
Harold Booton	Full back	39	1	3	0	42	1
Jimmy Cringan	Full back	3	0	0	0	3	0
Bernard Smith	Full back	2	0	0	0	2	0
Charlie Calladine	Half back	42	2	3	0	45	2
Tom Fillingham	Half back	22	1	0	0	23	1
Isaac Lea	Half back	6	1	0	0	6	1
George Morrall	Half back	28	0	3	1	31	1
Lewis Stoker	Half back	39	0	3	0	42	0
Jack Sykes	Half back	1	0	0	0	1	0
Joe Bradford	Forward	31	5	2	0	33	5
Ernie Curtis †	Forward	8	2	0	0	8	2
Bob Gregg †	Forward	1	0	0	0	1	0
Tom Grosvenor	Forward	18	2	0	0	18	2
Billy Guest	Forward	16	5	2	0	18	5
George Haywood	Forward	4	1	2	2	6	3
Bill Horsman	Forward	17	1	3	0	20	1
Francis McGurk	Forward	18	3	0	0	18	3
Dave Mangnall	Forward	12	4	0	0	12	4
Sid Moffat	Forward	8	3	0	0	8	3
Fred Roberts	Forward	28	8	2	0	30	2
Jimmy Robertson	Forward	6	1	2	1	8	2
Fred Shaw	Forward	6	0	0	0	6	0
Sam Smith	Forward	10	3	0	0	10	3
Jack Thorogood	Forward	2	0	1	0	3	0
Frank White	Forward	17	5	1	0	17	5

== See also ==
- Birmingham City F.C. seasons
