= 1936–37 Birmingham F.C. season =

Birmingham F.C.
1936–37 season
- Chairman: Howard Cant
- Manager: George Liddell
- Ground: St Andrew's
- Football League First Division: 11th
- FA Cup: Third round (eliminated by Stoke City)
- Top goalscorer: League: Seymour Morris (15); All: Seymour Morris (16)
- Highest home attendance: 39,940 vs Arsenal, 14 November 1936
- Lowest home attendance: 8,892 vs Derby County, 12 December 1936
- Average home league attendance: 22,991
Home colours

The 1936–37 Football League season was Birmingham Football Club's 41st in the Football League and their 24th in the First Division. They finished in 11th position in the 22-team division. They entered the 1936–37 FA Cup at the third round proper and lost to Stoke City in that round.

Twenty-nine players made at least one appearance in nationally organised competition, and there were thirteen different goalscorers. Goalkeeper Harry Hibbs played in 40 of the 43 matches over the season; among outfield players, full-back Cyril Trigg played in one fewer. Seymour Morris was leading scorer with 16 goals, of which 15 came in the league.

== Football League First Division ==
Date	League position	Opponents	Venue	Result	Score F–A	Scorers	Attendance
29 August 1936	5th	Portsmouth	H	W	2–1	Dearson, Morris	24,914
2 September 1936	11th	West Bromwich Albion	A	L	2–3	Morris, Jones	26,378
5 September 1936	8th	Chelsea	A	W	3–1	Morris, Harris, Dearson	32,803
9 September 1936	6th	West Bromwich Albion	H	D	1–1	Harris	23,813
12 September 1936	10th	Stoke City	H	L	2–4	Jennings, Harris	14,314
16 September 1936	10th	Manchester City	A	D	1–1	Morris	20,280
19 September 1936	9th	Charlton Athletic	A	D	2–2	Jones, Morris	35,421
26 September 1936	14th	Grimsby Town	H	L	2–3	Jones, Harris	21,985
3 October 1936	17th	Liverpool	A	L	0–2		23,892
10 October 1936	15th	Leeds United	H	W	2–1	Jones, Harris	23,833
17 October 1936	10th	Huddersfield Town	H	W	4–2	Fillingham, Jones, White 2 (1 pen)	25,055
24 October 1936	10th	Everton	A	D	3–3	Brunskill, Harris, Morris	26,944
31 October 1936	9th	Bolton Wanderers	H	D	1–1	Morris	23,288
7 November 1936	14th	Brentford	A	L	1–2	Dearson	22,905
14 November 1936	16th	Arsenal	H	L	1–3	Devine	39,940
21 November 1936	16th	Preston North End	A	D	2–2	White 2 (1 pen)	16,892
28 November 1936	16th	Sheffield Wednesday	H	D	1–1	Millership og	17,993
5 December 1936	15th	Manchester United	A	W	2–1	White, Jones	16,544
12 December 1936	16th	Derby County	H	L	0–1		8,892
19 December 1936	19th	Wolverhampton Wanderers	A	L	1–2	Clarke	19,249
25 December 1936	14th	Sunderland	H	W	2–0	Harris, Jones	37,191
26 December 1936	16th	Portsmouth	A	L	1–2	Jones	32,020
28 December 1936	17th	Sunderland	A	L	0–4		17,306
2 January 1937	16th	Chelsea	H	D	0–0		17,673
9 January 1937	16th	Stoke City	A	L	0–2		15,311
23 January 1937	20th	Charlton Athletic	H	L	1–2	White	16,976
2 February 1937	18th	Grimsby Town	A	D	1–1	Harris	6,773
6 February 1937	16th	Liverpool	H	W	5–0	Morris, Beattie, Jennings, Harris, White	21,735
13 February 1937	16th	Leeds United	A	W	2–0	Beattie, Morris	13,674
20 February 1937	16th	Huddersfield Town	A	D	1–1	Beattie	10,334
27 February 1937	14th	Everton	H	W	2–0	Beattie, White	21,150
6 March 1937	15th	Bolton Wanderers	A	D	0–0		21,572
13 March 1937	13th	Brentford	H	W	4–0	Morris 2, White, Harris	30,510
20 March 1937	13th	Arsenal	A	D	1–1	Beattie	46,086
26 March 1937	14th	Middlesbrough	A	L	1–3	Clarke	24,958
27 March 1937	13th	Preston North End	H	W	1–0	Harris	26,350
29 March 1937	12th	Middlesbrough	H	D	0–0		28,624
3 April 1937	11th	Sheffield Wednesday	A	W	3–0	Morris 2, Richards	20,804
10 April 1937	10th	Manchester United	H	D	2–2	Clarke, Beattie	19,130
17 April 1937	13th	Derby County	A	L	1–3	Morris	10,802
24 April 1937	13th	Wolverhampton Wanderers	H	W	1–0	Jennings pen	22,110
1 May 1937	11th	Manchester City	H	D	2–2	Morris, Clarke	17,325

=== League table (part) ===
Final First Division table (part)
Pos	Club	Pld	W	D	L	F	A	GA	Pts
9th	Portsmouth	42	17	10	15	62	66	0.94	44
10th	Stoke City	42	15	12	15	72	57	1.26	42
11th	Birmingham	42	13	15	14	64	60	1.07	41
12th	Grimsby Town	42	17	7	18	86	81	1.06	41
13th	Chelsea	42	14	13	15	52	55	0.94	41
Key	Pos = League position; Pld = Matches played; W = Matches won; D = Matches drawn; L = Matches lost; F = Goals for; A = Goals against; GA = Goal average; Pts = Points								
Source									

== FA Cup ==
Round	Date	Opponents	Venue	Result	Score F–A	Scorers	Attendance
Third round	16 January 1937	Stoke City	H	L	1–4	Morris	31,480

== Appearances and goals ==
This table includes appearances and goals in nationally organised competitive matches – the Football League and FA Cup – only.
For a description of the playing positions, see Formation (association football)#2–3–5 (Pyramid).
Players marked † left the club during the playing season.

Players' appearances and goals by competition
Name	Position	League		FA Cup		Total	
Name	Position	Apps	Goals	Apps	Goals	Apps	Goals
Frank Clack	Goalkeeper	3	0	0	0	3	0
Harry Hibbs	Goalkeeper	39	0	1	0	40	0
Ned Barkas	Full back	22	0	1	0	23	0
Billy Hughes	Full back	6	0	0	0	6	0
Willie Steel	Full back	17	0	0	0	17	0
Ernie Sykes	Full back	1	0	0	0	1	0
Cyril Trigg	Full back	38	0	1	0	39	0
Norman Brunskill	Half back	21	1	1	0	22	1
Dick Butler	Half back	3	0	0	0	3	0
Joe Devine	Half back	17	1	0	0	17	1
Tom Fillingham	Half back	32	1	0	0	32	1
Isaac Lea	Half back	6	0	1	0	7	0
Joe Loughran	Half back	8	0	1	0	9	0
Jim Olney	Half back	2	0	0	0	2	0
Dai Richards	Half back	8	1	0	0	8	1
Lewis Stoker	Half back	19	0	0	0	19	0
Jack Sykes	Half back	17	0	1	0	18	0
John Beattie	Forward	17	6	0	0	17	6
Albert Clarke	Forward	11	4	0	0	11	4
Don Dearson	Forward	22	3	0	0	22	3
Billy Guest †	Forward	3	0	0	0	3	0
Fred Harris	Forward	35	11	1	0	36	11
Dennis Jennings	Forward	25	3	1	0	26	3
Charlie Wilson Jones	Forward	22	8	0	0	22	8
Kenny Kendrick	Forward	1	0	0	0	1	0
Seymour Morris	Forward	35	15	1	1	36	16
Ernie Richardson	Forward	2	0	0	0	2	0
Sam Small †	Forward	3	0	0	0	3	0
Frank White	Forward	27	9	1	0	28	9

== See also ==
- Birmingham City F.C. seasons
