= 1937–38 Birmingham F.C. season =

Birmingham F.C.
1937–38 season
- Chairman: Howard Cant
- Manager: George Liddell
- Ground: St Andrew's
- Football League First Division: 18th
- FA Cup: Third round (eliminated by Blackpool)
- Top goalscorer: League: Charlie Wilson Jones, Don Dearson (9); All: Charlie Wilson Jones, Don Dearson (9)
- Highest home attendance: 40,321 vs Blackpool, FA Cup 3rd round, 8 January 1938
- Lowest home attendance: 14,441 vs Leicester City, 15 September 1937
- Average home league attendance: 24,555
Home colours

The 1937–38 Football League season was Birmingham Football Club's 42nd in the Football League and their 25th in the First Division. They finished in 18th position in the 22-team division, only two points clear of the relegation places. They entered the 1937–38 FA Cup at the third round proper and lost to Blackpool in that round.

Twenty-four players made at least one appearance in nationally organised competition, and there were thirteen different goalscorers. Half-back Norman Brunskill played in 37 of the 43 matches over the season, and full-back Cyril Trigg, half-back Dai Richards, and forwards Don Dearson and Frank White played in 36. Dearson and Charlie Wilson Jones were joint leading scorers with nine goals, all scored in the league. This was the last season under the chairmanship of Howard Cant, who first took office in 1911. He was succeeded by Harry Morris, son of the former player and director, also called Harry Morris.

== Football League First Division ==
Date	League position	Opponents	Venue	Result	Score F–A	Scorers	Attendance
28 August 1937	11th	Stoke City	A	D	2–2	Richards, Morris	27,656
1 September 1937	6th	Middlesbrough	H	W	3–1	Beattie 3	19,297
4 September 1937	6th	Portsmouth	H	D	2–2	Morris, White	28,462
8 September 1937	4th	Middlesbrough	A	D	1–1	Jones	18,831
11 September 1937	7th	Chelsea	A	L	0–2		34,072
15 September 1937	7th	Leicester City	H	W	4–1	Jones 3, White	14,441
18 September 1937	9th	Charlton Athletic	H	D	1–1	Jones	31,631
25 September 1937	13th	Preston North End	A	L	1–2	White	25,066
2 October 1937	13th	Grimsby Town	H	D	2–2	Jones, Morris	25,644
9 October 1937	14th	Leeds United	A	L	0–1		20,698
16 October 1937	16th	Sunderland	A	L	0–1		24,615
23 October 1937	14th	Derby County	H	W	1–0	Brunskill	23,992
30 October 1937	15th	Manchester City	A	L	0–2		16,829
6 November 1937	17th	Huddersfield Town	H	D	2–2	Dearson 2	21,541
13 November 1937	14th	Blackpool	A	W	3–0	Clarke 2, Morris	13,975
20 November 1937	13th	Wolverhampton Wanderers	H	W	2–0	Dearson, Kendrick	35,272
27 November 1937	14th	Bolton Wanderers	A	D	1–1	Clarke	21,999
4 December 1937	15th	Arsenal	H	L	1–2	Morris	18,440
11 December 1937	13th	Everton	A	D	1–1	Morris	17,018
18 December 1937	13th	Brentford	H	D	0–0		22,531
27 December 1937	13th	Liverpool	H	D	2–2	Morris, Kendrick	39,563
1 January 1938	15th	Stoke City	H	D	1–1	Jones	25,130
15 January 1938	12th	Portsmouth	A	D	1–1	Beattie	19,482
22 January 1938	13th	Chelsea	H	D	1–1	Jones	18,480
29 January 1938	14th	Charlton Athletic	A	L	0–2		21,246
5 February 1938	17th	Preston North End	H	L	0–2		24,908
12 February 1938	19th	Grimsby Town	A	L	0–4		9,256
19 February 1938	16th	Leeds United	H	W	3–2	Dearson 2, White	20,403
26 February 1938	16th	Sunderland	H	D	2–2	Madden, Harris	25,960
5 March 1938	15th	Derby County	A	D	0–0		14,533
12 March 1938	16th	Manchester City	H	D	2–2	Harris 2	23,078
19 March 1938	19th	Huddersfield Town	A	L	1–2	Dearson	15,365
26 March 1938	17th	Blackpool	H	D	1–1	Harris	19,902
2 April 1938	19th	Wolverhampton Wanderers	A	L	2–3	Jones, Phillips	27,420
6 April 1938	19th	Liverpool	A	L	2–3	Harris, Jennings	14,656
9 April 1938	19th	Bolton Wanderers	H	W	2–0	Harris, Phillips	19,889
15 April 1938	15th	West Bromwich Albion	H	W	2–1	Dearson 2	34,361
16 April 1938	16th	Arsenal	A	D	0–0		35,161
18 April 1938	17th	West Bromwich Albion	A	L	3–4	Jennings, Phillips 2	34,406
23 April 1938	21st	Everton	H	L	0–3		22,724
30 April 1938	18th	Brentford	A	W	2–1	Harris, Jennings pen	14,609
7 May 1938	18th	Leicester City	A	W	4–1	Dearson, Clarke, White 2	13,265

=== League table (part) ===
Final First Division table (part)
Pos	Club	Pld	W	D	L	F	A	GA	Pts
16th	Leicester City	42	14	11	17	54	75	0.72	39
17th	Stoke City	42	13	12	17	58	59	0.98	38
18th	Birmingham	42	10	18	14	58	62	0.94	38
19th	Portsmouth	42	13	12	17	62	68	0.91	38
20th	Grimsby Town	42	13	12	17	51	68	0.75	38
Key	Pos = League position; Pld = Matches played; W = Matches won; D = Matches drawn; L = Matches lost; F = Goals for; A = Goals against; GA = Goal average; Pts = Points								
Source									

== FA Cup ==
Round	Date	Opponents	Venue	Result	Score F–A	Scorers	Attendance
Third round	8 January 1938	Blackpool	H	L	0–1		40,321

== Appearances and goals ==
This table includes appearances and goals in nationally organised competitive matches – the Football League and FA Cup – only.
For a description of the playing positions, see Formation (association football)#2–3–5 (Pyramid).
Players marked † left the club during the playing season.

Players' appearances and goals by competition
Name	Position	League		FA Cup		Total	
Name	Position	Apps	Goals	Apps	Goals	Apps	Goals
Harry Hibbs	Goalkeeper	34	0	1	0	35	0
Frank Clack	Goalkeeper	8	0	0	0	8	0
Samuel Bellamy	Full back	1	0	0	0	1	0
Billy Hughes	Full back	32	0	1	0	33	0
Willie Steel	Full back	16	0	0	0	16	0
Cyril Trigg	Full back	35	0	1	0	36	0
Norman Brunskill	Half back	35	1	1	0	36	1
Dick Butler	Half back	5	0	1	0	6	0
Tom Fillingham	Half back	31	0	0	0	31	0
Harry Parr	Half back	1	0	0	0	1	0
Dai Richards	Half back	35	1	1	0	36	1
Lewis Stoker	Half back	13	0	0	0	13	0
Jack Beattie †	Forward	19	4	0	0	19	4
Albert Clarke	Forward	17	4	0	0	17	4
Don Dearson	Forward	35	9	1	0	36	9
Fred Harris	Forward	19	7	1	0	20	7
Dennis Jennings	Forward	18	3	1	0	19	3
Charlie Wilson Jones	Forward	18	9	1	0	19	9
Jack Kelly	Forward	8	0	0	0	8	0
Kenny Kendrick	Forward	7	2	0	0	7	2
Owen Madden	Forward	7	1	0	0	7	1
Seymour Morris	Forward	22	7	0	0	22	7
Charlie Phillips	Forward	9	4	0	0	9	4
Ray Shaw	Forward	2	0	0	0	2	0
Frank White	Forward	35	6	1	0	36	6

== See also ==
- Birmingham City F.C. seasons
