= 1932–33 Birmingham F.C. season =

Birmingham F.C.
1932–33 season
- Chairman: Howard Cant
- Manager: Leslie Knighton
- Ground: St Andrew's
- Football League First Division: 13th
- FA Cup: Sixth round (eliminated by West Ham United)
- Top goalscorer: League: Joe Bradford (14); All: Joe Bradford, Ernie Curtis (14)
- Highest home attendance: 31,592 vs Arsenal, 27 August 1932
- Lowest home attendance: 8,850 vs Leicester City, 29 April 1933
- Average home league attendance: 16,894
Home colours

The 1932–33 Football League season was Birmingham Football Club's 37th season overall in the Football League and their 20th consecutive season the First Division. They finished in 13th position in the 22-team division. They also competed in the 1932–33 FA Cup, entering at the third round proper and losing to West Ham United in the sixth (quarter-final).

Twenty-four players made at least one appearance in nationally organised competition, and there were nine different goalscorers. Full-back Harold Booton and forward Tom Grosvenor were ever-present over the 47-match season, and there were joint leading scorers, with 14 goals: Ernie Curtis and, for the 12th successive season, Joe Bradford. All Bradford's goals came in the league.

At the end of the season, Birmingham were unable to match the offer made by Chelsea to Leslie Knighton to become their manager.

== Football League First Division ==
Date	League position	Opponents	Venue	Result	Score F–A	Scorers	Attendance
27 August 1932	19th	Arsenal	H	L	0–1		31,592
31 August 1932	22nd	Manchester City	A	L	0–1		20,665
3 September 1932	22nd	Everton	A	L	1–4	Grosvenor	27,559
7 September 1932	18th	Manchester City	H	W	3–0	Briggs, Bradford 2	13,463
10 September 1932	14th	Blackpool	H	W	2–1	Curtis pen, Bradford	16,048
17 September 1932	13th	Derby County	A	D	2–2	Bradford, Briggs	16,352
24 September 1932	9th	Blackburn Rovers	H	W	3–1	Grosvenor, Curtis, Gregg	19,883
1 October 1932	11th	Leeds United	A	D	1–1	Thorogood	14,193
8 October 1932	8th	Sheffield Wednesday	H	W	2–1	Thorogood, Grosvenor	14,999
15 October 1932	10th	West Bromwich Albion	A	L	0–1		29,346
22 October 1932	12th	Aston Villa	A	L	0–1		52,191
29 October 1932	15th	Middlesbrough	H	L	1–4	Bradford	9,090
5 November 1932	16th	Chelsea	A	L	2–4	Grosvenor, Curtis pen	25,619
12 November 1932	16th	Huddersfield Town	H	L	0–2		14,223
19 November 1932	17th	Sheffield United	A	L	1–2	Briggs	10,302
26 November 1932	19th	Wolverhampton Wanderers	H	D	0–0		22,845
3 December 1932	19th	Bolton Wanderers	A	D	2–2	Bradford, Briggs	8,970
10 December 1932	17th	Liverpool	H	W	3–0	Gregg 3	11,281
17 December 1932	19th	Leicester City	A	D	2–2	Cringan, Gregg	11,979
24 December 1932	16th	Portsmouth	H	W	4–0	Grosvenor, Bradford, Gregg	15,716
26 December 1932	17th	Newcastle United	A	L	1–2	Curtis	41,748
27 December 1932	18th	Newcastle United	H	L	1–2	J Richardson og	29,371
31 December 1932	19th	Arsenal	A	L	0–3		37,800
7 January 1933	16th	Everton	H	W	4–0	Haywood 3, Grosvenor	17,365
21 January 1933	16th	Blackpool	A	W	1–0	Calladine	10,352
1 February 1933	14th	Derby County	H	W	3–1	Gregg, Haywood, Curtis	9,682
4 February 1933	15th	Blackburn Rovers	A	L	0–2		7,448
11 February 1933	15th	Leeds United	H	W	2–1	Haywood, Curtis pen	22,157
8 March 1933	15th	Aston Villa	H	W	3–2	Briggs, Bradford, Grosvenor	24,868
11 March 1933	15th	Middlesbrough	A	D	2–2	Bradford, Curtis	14,646
18 March 1933	14th	Chelsea	H	D	0–0		19,620
25 March 1933	14th	Huddersfield Town	A	D	0–0		8,609
1 April 1933	14th	Sheffield United	H	W	4–1	Bradford 2, Curtis 2	11,074
5 April 1933	14th	Sheffield Wednesday	A	D	1–1	Curtis	6,088
8 April 1933	14th	Wolverhampton Wanderers	A	L	0–1		25,267
14 April 1933	15th	Sunderland	A	L	0–1		14,658
15 April 1933	14th	Bolton Wanderers	H	W	2–1	Bradford 2	13,541
17 April 1933	13th	Sunderland	H	W	2–0	Curtis, Bradford	12,596
22 April 1933	14th	Liverpool	A	L	0–1		14,011
26 April 1933	13th	West Bromwich Albion	H	D	1–1	Briggs	16,509
29 April 1933	13th	Leicester City	H	L	0–4		8,850
6 May 1933	13th	Portsmouth	A	D	1–1	Grosvenor	11,429

=== League table (part) ===
Final First Division table (part)
Pos	Club	Pld	W	D	L	F	A	GA	Pts
11th	Everton	42	16	9	17	81	74	1.09	41
12th	Sunderland	42	15	10	17	63	80	0.79	40
13th	Birmingham	42	14	11	17	57	57	1.00	39
14th	Liverpool	42	14	11	17	79	84	0.94	39
15th	Blackburn Rovers	42	14	10	18	76	102	0.74	38
Key	Pos = League position; Pld = Matches played; W = Matches won; D = Matches drawn; L = Matches lost; F = Goals for; A = Goals against; GA = Goal average; Pts = Points								
Source									

== FA Cup ==
Round	Date	Opponents	Venue	Result	Score F–A	Scorers	Attendance
Third round	14 January 1933	Preston North End	H	W	2–1	Gregg, Grosvenor	29,497
Fourth round	28 January 1933	Blackburn Rovers	H	W	3–0	Curtis 2, Haywood	25,617
Fifth round	18 February 1933	Middlesbrough	A	D	0–0		27,705
Fifth round replay	22 February 1933	Middlesbrough	H	W	3–0	Gregg, Haywood, Curtis	29,191
Sixth round	4 March 1933	West Ham United	A	L	0–4		44,232

== Appearances and goals ==
This table includes appearances and goals in nationally organised competitive matches – the Football League and FA Cup – only.
For a description of the playing positions, see Formation (association football)#2–3–5 (Pyramid).

Players' appearances and goals by competition
Name	Position	League		FA Cup		Total	
Name	Position	Apps	Goals	Apps	Goals	Apps	Goals
Harry Hibbs	Goalkeeper	40	0	5	0	45	0
Jackie Mittell	Goalkeeper	2	0	0	0	2	0
Ned Barkas	Full back	28	0	5	0	33	0
Harold Booton	Full back	42	0	5	0	47	0
Jack Randle	Full back	4	0	0	0	4	0
Bernard Smith	Full back	9	0	0	0	9	0
Charlie Calladine	Half back	22	1	5	0	27	1
Jimmy Cringan	Half back	5	1	0	0	5	1
Tom Fillingham	Half back	15	0	0	0	15	0
Jack Firth	Half back	5	0	0	0	5	0
Isaac Lea	Half back	5	0	0	0	5	0
George Morrall	Half back	38	0	5	0	43	0
Lewis Stoker	Half back	38	0	5	0	43	0
Joe Bradford	Forward	26	14	0	0	26	14
George Briggs	Forward	35	6	5	0	40	6
Ernie Curtis	Forward	36	11	5	3	41	16
Bob Gregg	Forward	34	7	5	2	39	9
Tom Grosvenor	Forward	42	9	5	1	47	10
George Haywood	Forward	11	5	5	2	16	7
Bill Horsman	Forward	6	0	0	0	6	0
Tommy Robinson	Forward	3	0	0	0	3	0
Sam Smith	Forward	6	0	0	0	6	0
Jack Thorogood	Forward	9	2	0	0	9	2
Frank White	Forward	1	0	0	0	1	0

== See also ==
- Birmingham City F.C. seasons
