= List of Birmingham City F.C. seasons =

Small Heath F.C., champions of the inaugural Football League Second Division 1892–93

Birmingham City Football Club, an association football club based in Birmingham, England, was founded in 1875 as Small Heath Alliance. For the first thirteen years of their existence, there was no league football, so matches were arranged on an ad hoc basis, supplemented by cup competitions organised at local and national level. Small Heath first entered the FA Cup in the 1881–82 season, and won their first trophy, the Walsall Cup, the following season. During the 1880s, they played between 20 and 30 matches each season.

In 1888, the club became a limited company under the name of Small Heath F.C. Ltd, and joined the Combination, a league set up to provide organised football for those clubs not invited to join the Football League which was to start the same year. However, the Combination was not well organised and folded in April 1889 with many fixtures still outstanding. Small Heath were founder members of the Football Alliance in 1889–90, and three years later were elected to the newly formed Second Division of the Football League. They topped the table in their first season, failing to win promotion via the test match system then in operation, but reached the top flight for the first time in 1894. They were renamed Birmingham in 1905, finally becoming Birmingham City in 1943.

Birmingham City FC Seasons

The club's official history rated 1955–56 as their best season to date. The newly promoted club achieved their highest ever finishing position of sixth in the First Division, reached the 1956 FA Cup Final, and became the first English club side to participate in European competition when they played their opening game in the group stages of the Inter-Cities Fairs Cup. (Note: Birmingham City became the first English club team to take part in European competition when they played their first group game in the 1955–58 Inter-Cities Fairs Cup on 15 May 1956, a goalless draw away at Internazionale. The competition lasted over three English seasons with the final not played until 1958. The London XI, a representative side made up of players from several London clubs, were the first English team when they played their first group game in 1955.) Their only major trophy is the League Cup, which they won in 1963 and 2011; they reached the FA Cup final twice and the final of the Inter-Cities Fairs Cup twice. During the 1990s, they twice won the Football League Trophy, a competition open to clubs in the third and fourth tiers of English football, and in 2024–25, they won the third-tier EFL League One title with a league record points total of 111.

As of the end of the 2024–25 season, the club's first team had spent 57 seasons in the top division of English football, 60 in the second and 5 in the third. The table details their achievements in first-team competitions, and records their top goalscorer and average home league attendance, for each completed season since their first appearance in the Birmingham Senior Cup in 1878–79.

== Key ==
Key to league record:

- P – Played
- W – Games won
- D – Games drawn
- L – Games lost
- F – Goals for
- A – Goals against
- Pts – Points
- Pos – Final position

Key to colours and symbols:

1st or W	Winners
2nd or F	Runners-up
↑	Promoted
↓	Relegated
♦	Top league scorer in Birmingham's division

Key to divisions:

- Comb – The Combination (Note: An attempt was made to set up a league called The Combination involving clubs not invited to join the Football League. Lack of proper organisation meant it was wound up in April 1889 with many fixtures still outstanding. Small Heath played 11 of their full 16 fixtures.)
- All – Football Alliance (Note: Founder member of the Football Alliance, which started a year after the Football League.)
- United – United League (Note: The United Counties League (or United Midland Counties League) was one of several short-lived leagues of similar name. This one was established in 1894, involving ten teams from the Midlands, to be played as a supplementary competition to fill vacant dates in the season without the trouble and expense of arranging friendly matches. Small Heath finished third in their four-team section in the 1893–94 season, and did not participate again.)
- Div 1 – Football League First Division
- Div 2 – Football League Second Division
- Div 3 – Football League Third Division
- Champ – Football League Championship/EFL Championship
- Prem – Premier League
- League One – EFL League One

Key to rounds:

- Prelim – Preliminary round
- Group – Group stage
- QR3 – Third qualifying round
- QR4 – Fourth qualifying round, etc.
- IntR – Intermediate round (between qualifying rounds and rounds proper)
- R1 – First round
- R2 – Second round, etc.
- QF – Quarter-final
- SF – Semi-final
- P3rd – Third place
- F – Finalists
- W – Winners
- DQ – Disqualified
- DNE – Did not enter

Details of abandoned competitions – The Combination in 1888–89 and the 1939–40 Football League – are shown in italics and appropriately footnoted.

== Seasons ==
List of seasons, including league division and statistics, cup results, top scorer and average league attendance
Season	League									FA Cup (Note: Beginning with the 1925–26 season, the FA Cup was structured so that the third round proper contained 64 teams. Prior to that date, the structure had varied, so rounds are not directly comparable to the round of the same name after 1925. For example, in 1892–93, Small Heath's first season in the Football League, there were only three rounds proper before the semifinal, as compared with the current six.)	League Cup (Note: The League Cup competition began in the 1960–61 season.)	Other		Top scorer(s) (Note: Includes goals scored in the Football Alliance, the Football League, including test matches and play-offs, Premier League, FA Cup, League Cup, Inter-Cities Fairs Cup, UEFA Europa League, EFL Trophy and predecessors, Anglo-Italian Cup, Texaco Cup, Anglo-Scottish Cup and Full Members' Cup. Goals scored in seasons from 1881–82 to 1888–89 sourced to Matthews (1995), p. 231, from 1889–90 to 2009–10 sourced to Matthews (2010), pp. 224–455, 473–483 and from 2010–11 onwards sourced to Soccerbase.)		Avg. (Note: League matches only (including Football Alliance, Football League and Premier League, but excluding test matches and play-offs). Sourced from Matthews (1995) up to and including the 1994–95 season, from European Football Statistics from 1995–96 to 2001–02 inclusive, from ESPN FC thereafter, or individually.) attendance
Season	Division (Note: Divisions are sorted according to their level within the English football league system at the time.)	Pld	W	D	L	GF	GA	Pts	Pos	FA Cup	League Cup	Competition	Result	Player(s)	Goals	Avg. attendance
1878–79	—	—	—	—	—	—	—	—	—	—	—	Birmingham Senior Cup	R1	n/a	—	—
1879–80	—	—	—	—	—	—	—	—	—	—	—	Birmingham Senior Cup	R2	n/a	—	—
1880–81	—	—	—	—	—	—	—	—	—	—	—	Birmingham Senior Cup	R4	n/a	—	—
1881–82	—	—	—	—	—	—	—	—	—	R2	—	Birmingham Senior Cup	R2	Billy Slater (Note: The first of Slater's two goals in the FA Cup first round tie against Derby Town, a 4–1 win played at the Coventry Road ground on 17 October 1881, was the club's first goal in national competitive football.)	2	—
1882–83	—	—	—	—	—	—	—	—	—	R1	—	Birmingham Senior Cup	R1	Billy Slater	2	—
1883–84	—	—	—	—	—	—	—	—	—	R1	—	Birmingham Senior Cup	R3	Arthur James	2	—
1884–85	—	—	—	—	—	—	—	—	—	R1	—	Birmingham Senior Cup	R2	No goalscorer	—	—
1885–86	—	—	—	—	—	—	—	—	—	SF	—	Birmingham Senior Cup	R2	Eddy Stanley	7	—
1886–87	—	—	—	—	—	—	—	—	—	R1	—	Birmingham Senior Cup	SF	Jack Price	1	—
1887–88	—	—	—	—	—	—	—	—	—	R2	—	Birmingham Senior Cup	R1	Walter Dixon; Austin Smith	2	—
1888–89	Comb	11	6	3	2	24	17	15	6th	R1	—	Birmingham Senior Cup	R1	Will Devey (Note: FA Cup goals only.)	5	—
1889–90	All	22	6	5	11	44	67	17	10th	R2	—	Birmingham Senior Cup	R2	Will Devey	27	1,068
1890–91	All	22	7	2	13	58	66	16	10th	DQ (Note: Disqualified for fielding an improperly registered player, after eliminating Hednesford Town and Wednesbury Old Athletic in the qualifying rounds.)	—	Birmingham Senior Cup	R1	Will Devey; Charlie Short	17	2,545
1891–92	All	22	12	5	5	53	36	29	3rd	R2	—	Birmingham Senior Cup	R2	Fred Wheldon	29	2,100
1892–93	Div 2 (Note: The Football League expanded its membership at the end of this season by forming a Second Division. All but one of the 12 Football Alliance teams accepted invitations to join.)	22	17	2	3	90	35	36	1st (Note: Promotion and relegation decided by test matches, in which third bottom in First Division played third in Second Division, second bottom in First Division played second in Second Division, and bottom club in First Division played top club from Second Division, in one-off games at neutral venues, winners to play in the following season's First Division. Small Heath drew 1–1 with Newton Heath but lost the replay 5–2, so were not promoted despite winning the division.)	R1	—	Birmingham Senior Cup	SF	Fred Wheldon (Note: The Rec.Sport.Soccer Statistics Foundation (RSSSF) lists Wheldon as having scored a divisional best 24 goals in Division Two, but Matthews (2010) assigns him 25.)	26 ♦	2,181
1893–94	Div 2 ↑; United	28; 6	21; 2	0; 1	7; 3	103; 14	44; 14	42; 5	2nd (Note: Promoted via test match, beating Darwen 3–1.); 3rd	R1	—	Birmingham Senior Cup	R1	Frank Mobley (Note: Scored 24 goals in Division Two,)	25 ♦	2,928
1894–95	Div 1	30	9	7	14	50	74	25	12th	R1	—	Birmingham Senior Cup	SF	Frank Mobley	13	6,440
1895–96	Div 1 ↓	30	8	4	18	39	79	20	15th (Note: Promotion and relegation decided by test match system in which bottom two clubs in First Division and top two clubs in Second Division played a mini-league of home and away matches against the two clubs in the other division, top two in mini-league to play in following season's First Division. Small Heath finished third in the mini-league so were relegated.)	R1	—	Birmingham Senior Cup	R1	Frank Mobley	11	6,233
1896–97	Div 2	30	16	5	9	69	47	37	4th	R1	—	Birmingham Senior Cup	R2	Jimmy Inglis	16	4,526
1897–98	Div 2	30	16	4	10	58	50	36	6th (Note: The final test match left the two clubs involved needing to draw for them both to win promotion, which unsurprisingly is what happened. The Football League decided to expand each division by two places, and the existing clubs voted for two clubs to take the two new places in the First Division. Candidates were the losers from the two test match series plus teams placed third to sixth in the Second Division. Small Heath came fourth in the vote, so remained in the Second Division. From then on the League adopted promotion and relegation directly dependent on league position (two up, two down).)	QR3	—	Birmingham Senior Cup	R2	Walter Abbott	19	5,633
1898–99	Div 2	34	17	7	10	85	50	41	8th	R2	—	Birmingham Senior Cup	R2	Walter Abbott (Note: Abbott's 34 Second Division goals and 42 total goals in a season are club records.)	42 ♦	5,588
1899–1900	Div 2	34	20	6	8	78	38	46	3rd	QR5	—	Birmingham Senior Cup	R1	Bob McRoberts	24	5,176
1900–01	Div 2 ↑	34	19	10	5	57	24	48	2nd	QF	—	Birmingham Senior Cup	R1	Bob McRoberts	17	5,558
1901–02	Div 1 ↓	34	11	8	15	47	45	30	17th	IntR	—	Birmingham Senior Cup	R1	Bob McRoberts	11	13,058
1902–03	Div 2 ↑	34	24	3	7	74	36	51	2nd	R1	—	Birmingham Senior Cup	R1	Arthur Leonard	16	7,411
1903–04	Div 1	34	11	8	15	39	52	30	11th	IntR	—	Birmingham Senior Cup	R1	Billy Jones; Freddie Wilcox	8	11,386
1904–05	Div 1	34	17	5	12	54	38	39	7th	R1	—	Birmingham Senior Cup	W	Billy Jones	16	14,441
1905–06	Div 1	38	17	7	14	65	59	41	7th	QF	—	—	—	Billy Jones	24	11,868
1906–07	Div 1	38	15	8	15	52	52	38	9th	R1	—	—	—	Billy Jones	15	15,315
1907–08	Div 1 ↓	38	9	12	17	40	60	30	20th	R1	—	—	—	Edmund Eyre	9	15,473
1908–09	Div 2	38	14	9	15	58	61	37	11th	R1	—	—	—	Billy Beer; Fred Chapple	8	10,607
1909–10	Div 2	38	8	7	23	42	78	23	20th (Note: There was no automatic relegation from the Football League until 1987. The bottom two clubs in the League, together with candidates from outside the League, applied for re-election. Each current League club had a vote. Small Heath were re-elected.)	R1	—	—	—	Walter Freeman	10	8,921
1910–11	Div 2	38	12	8	18	42	64	32	16th	R1	—	—	—	Jack Hall	14	13,764
1911–12	Div 2	38	14	6	18	55	59	34	12th	R1	—	—	—	Jack Hall	21	13,052
1912–13	Div 2	38	18	10	10	59	44	46	3rd	R1	—	—	—	Billy Jones	16	15,157
1913–14	Div 2	38	12	10	16	48	60	34	14th	R3	—	—	—	Andy Smith	10	17,411
1914–15	Div 2	38	17	9	12	62	39	43	6th	R3	—	—	—	Andy Smith	24	11,315
1915–19	The Football League and FA Cup were suspended until after the First World War. (Note: The club played 106 competitive games in regional football, the Midland Section Principal and Subsidiary Competitions, over three seasons from 1916 to 1919. Guest players were permitted, and results and records from this period are not included in official statistics.)															
1919–20	Div 2	42	24	8	10	85	34	56	3rd	R3	—	—	—	Bert Millard	15	22,880
1920–21	Div 2 ↑	42	24	10	8	79	38	58	1st	R1	—	—	—	Harry Hampton	16	31,244
1921–22	Div 1	42	15	7	20	48	60	37	18th	DNE (Note: Secretary-manager Frank Richards failed to submit the entry form in time to be granted exemption from qualifying, and the Football Association refused to bend the rules in their favour. Although that decision did not preclude their entering the competition in the qualifying rounds, the directors chose not to.)	—	—	—	Joe Bradford; Johnny Crosbie	10	27,967
1922–23	Div 1	42	13	11	18	41	57	37	17th	R1	—	—	—	Joe Bradford	19	25,328
1923–24	Div 1	42	13	13	16	41	49	39	14th	R1	—	—	—	Joe Bradford	24	20,395
1924–25	Div 1	42	17	12	13	49	53	46	8th	R3	—	—	—	Joe Bradford; George Briggs; Ernie Islip	11	22,547
1925–26	Div 1	42	16	8	18	66	81	40	14th	R4	—	—	—	Joe Bradford	27	21,649
1926–27	Div 1	42	17	4	21	64	73	38	17th	R4	—	—	—	Joe Bradford	23	24,372
1927–28	Div 1	42	13	15	14	70	75	41	11th	R5	—	—	—	Joe Bradford	32	21,646
1928–29	Div 1	42	15	10	17	68	77	40	15th	R4	—	—	—	Joe Bradford	24	23,406
1929–30	Div 1	42	16	9	17	67	62	41	11th	R4	—	—	—	Joe Bradford	23	22,193
1930–31	Div 1	42	13	10	19	55	70	36	19th	F (Note: Birmingham's first appearance in the Cup Final was a 2–1 defeat to Second Division West Bromwich Albion.)	—	—	—	Joe Bradford	22	21,275
1931–32	Div 1	42	18	8	16	78	67	44	9th	R4	—	—	—	Joe Bradford	28	23,380
1932–33	Div 1	42	14	11	17	57	57	39	13th	QF	—	—	—	Joe Bradford; Ernie Curtis	14	20,044
1933–34	Div 1	42	12	12	18	54	56	36	20th	R5	—	—	—	Fred Roberts	8	24,718
1934–35	Div 1	42	13	10	19	63	81	36	19th	QF	—	—	—	Wilson Jones	17	22,795
1935–36	Div 1	42	15	11	16	61	63	41	12th	R3	—	—	—	Wilson Jones	20	22,955
1936–37	Div 1	42	13	15	14	64	60	41	11th	R3	—	—	—	Seymour Morris	16	25,452
1937–38	Div 1	42	10	18	14	58	62	38	18th	R3	—	—	—	Don Dearson; Wilson Jones	9	26,434
1938–39	Div 1 ↓	42	12	8	22	62	84	32	21st	R5	—	—	—	Fred Harris	17	22,432
1939–40	Div 2	3	2	1	0	5	1	5	2nd (Note: When the Second World War began, the 1939–40 Football League season was abandoned with three matches played and Birmingham in second position.)	—	—	—	—	Jackie Brown; Don Dearson; Ted Duckhouse; Tom Farrage (Note: Plus one own goal.)	1	—
1939–45	The Football League and FA Cup were suspended until after the Second World War. (Note: The club played 215 competitive games in regional league and cup football between 1939 and 1946. Guest players were permitted, and results and records from this period are not included in official statistics.)															
1945–46	— (Note: This was the only full season played in the wartime Football League North and South regionalised competitions. These leagues included Football League First and Second Division clubs divided geographically, playing each other home and away. Birmingham won the Southern section on goal average from Aston Villa.)	—	—	—	—	—	—	—	—	SF (Note: From the first round proper to the sixth round of the 1945–46 FA Cup, matches were played over two legs. In the semifinal, Birmingham drew with Derby County at Hillsborough, Sheffield, in front of 65,000 spectators. The replay at Maine Road, Manchester, which attracted a crowd of over 80,000, went goalless into extra time, when defender Ted Duckhouse broke his leg trying to stop Derby's first goal. No substitutes were allowed, and Birmingham went on to lose 4–0.)	—	—	—	Jock Mulraney	7	—
1946–47	Div 2	42	25	5	12	74	33	55	3rd	QF	—	—	—	Cyril Trigg	19	32,462
1947–48	Div 2 ↑	42	22	15	5	55	24	59	1st	R3	—	—	—	Harold Bodle	14	36,467
1948–49	Div 1	42	11	15	16	36	38	37	17th	R3	—	—	—	Jackie Stewart	11	38,821
1949–50	Div 1 ↓	42	7	14	21	31	67	28	22nd	R3	—	—	—	Jimmy Dailey	9	34,310
1950–51	Div 2	42	20	9	13	64	53	49	4th	SF	—	—	—	Cyril Trigg	19	24,728
1951–52	Div 2	42	21	9	12	67	56	51	3rd	R4	—	—	—	Tommy Briggs	19	24,570
1952–53	Div 2	42	19	10	13	71	66	48	6th	QF	—	—	—	Peter Murphy	26	20,046
1953–54	Div 2	42	18	11	13	78	58	47	7th	R4	—	—	—	Ted Purdon	15	22,594
1954–55	Div 2 ↑	42	22	10	10	92	47	54	1st	QF	—	—	—	Peter Murphy	20	21,002
1955–56	Div 1	42	18	9	15	75	57	45	6th (Note: Highest League finish.)	F (Note: Reached the 1956 FA Cup Final without being drawn at home in any round, the first club so to do. Lost 3–1 to Manchester City in the game remembered for City's goalkeeper Bert Trautmann playing the last 15 minutes of the game with a broken bone in his neck.)	—	Inter-Cities Fairs Cup	—	Eddy Brown	29	33,828
1956–57	Div 1	42	15	9	18	69	69	39	12th (Note: Equal with Chelsea on goal average; number of goals scored was not taken into account.)	SF	—	Inter-Cities Fairs Cup	—	Alex Govan	30	32,582
1957–58	Div 1	42	14	11	17	76	89	39	13th	R3	—	Inter-Cities Fairs Cup	SF	Peter Murphy	23	29,647
1958–59	Div 1	42	20	6	16	84	68	46	9th	R5	—	Inter-Cities Fairs Cup	—	Bunny Larkin	23	26,893
1959–60	Div 1	42	13	10	19	63	80	36	19th	R3	—	Inter-Cities Fairs Cup (Note: Birmingham became the first English club team to reach the final of a European competition, losing on aggregate to Barcelona (0–0 at home, 1–4 away). The London XI, consisting of players from several London clubs, were the first English team when they reached the final of the 1955–58 Fairs Cup.)	F	Johnny Gordon	19	26,880
1960–61	Div 1	42	14	6	22	62	84	34	19th	R5	R3	Inter-Cities Fairs Cup (Note: Lost on aggregate to A.S. Roma (2–2 at home, 0–2 away).)	F	Jimmy Harris	17	25,751
1961–62	Div 1	42	14	10	18	65	81	38	17th	R3	R1	Inter-Cities Fairs Cup	R2	Jimmy Harris; Ken Leek	20	23,587
1962–63	Div 1	42	10	13	19	63	90	33	20th	R3	W (Note: Beat Aston Villa 3–1 on aggregate (3–1 at home, 0–0 away) to win club's first major trophy.)	—	—	Ken Leek	29	22,559
1963–64	Div 1	42	11	7	24	54	92	29	20th	R3	R2	—	—	Bertie Auld	10	21,996
1964–65	Div 1 ↓	42	8	11	23	64	96	27	22nd	R3	R2	—	—	Stan Lynn; Geoff Vowden	10	19,714
1965–66	Div 2	42	16	9	17	70	75	41	10th	R4	R2	—	—	Geoff Vowden	23	14,398
1966–67	Div 2	42	16	8	18	70	66	40	10th	QF	SF	—	—	Geoff Vowden	21	19,798
1967–68	Div 2	42	19	14	9	83	51	52	4th	SF	R3	—	—	Barry Bridges	28	28,083
1968–69	Div 2	42	18	8	16	73	59	44	7th	R5	R2	—	—	Fred Pickering; Phil Summerill	17	26,008
1969–70	Div 2	42	11	11	20	51	78	33	18th	R3	R2	—	—	Phil Summerill	13	24,028
1970–71	Div 2	42	17	12	13	58	48	46	9th	R3	R4	—	—	Phil Summerill	21	24,164
1971–72	Div 2 ↑	42	19	18	5	60	31	56	2nd	P3rd (Note: Between 1969–70 and 1973–74 the losing FA Cup semi-finalists took part in a third-place play-off. Birmingham beat Stoke City on penalties after a goalless draw, the first time an FA Cup match had been decided via a penalty shootout.)	R2	Anglo-Italian Cup	Group	Bob Latchford (Note: Scored 23 goals in Division Two.)	30 ♦	32,337
1972–73	Div 1	42	15	12	15	53	54	42	10th	R3	R4	—	—	Bob Latchford	20	36,663
1973–74	Div 1	42	12	13	17	52	64	37	19th	R4	QF	Texaco Cup (Note: The home leg of the quarter final match against Newcastle United finished 1–1. Despite use of floodlights being banned due to the fuel crisis, the League refused to allow an earlier kickoff time for the away leg. The match was abandoned at 1–1 after 10 minutes of extra time in almost total darkness. When the match was replayed, Birmingham lost 3–1.)	QF	Bob Hatton	20	33,048
1974–75	Div 1	42	14	9	19	53	61	37	17th	SF	R2	Texaco Cup	SF	Bob Hatton	18	30,854
1975–76	Div 1	42	13	7	22	57	75	33	19th	R3	R3	—	—	Trevor Francis	18	28,002
1976–77	Div 1	42	13	12	17	63	61	38	13th	R4	R2	—	—	Trevor Francis	21	28,338
1977–78	Div 1	42	16	9	17	55	60	41	11th	R4	R2	Anglo-Scottish Cup	Group	Trevor Francis	29	23,910
1978–79	Div 1 ↓	42	6	10	26	37	64	22	21st	R3	R2	—	—	Alan Buckley	8	20,164
1979–80	Div 2 ↑	42	21	11	10	58	38	53	3rd (Note: Number of teams promoted to and relegated from the First Division raised from two to three in 1973.)	R5	R3	Anglo-Scottish Cup	Group	Keith Bertschin	18	20,427
1980–81	Div 1	42	13	12	17	50	61	38	13th	R4	QF	—	—	Frank Worthington	18	19,248
1981–82	Div 1 (Note: This season saw the introduction of three points for a win instead of two.)	42	10	14	18	53	61	44	16th	R3	R2	—	—	Tony Evans	16	17,116
1982–83	Div 1	42	12	14	16	40	55	50	17th	R4	R4	—	—	Mick Ferguson	8	15,880
1983–84	Div 1 ↓	42	12	12	18	39	50	48	20th	QF	R4	—	—	Mick Harford	15	14,106
1984–85	Div 2 ↑	42	25	7	10	59	33	82	2nd	R3	R3	—	—	Wayne Clarke	19	12,522
1985–86	Div 1 ↓	42	8	5	29	30	73	29	21st	R3	R3	—	—	Andy Kennedy	8	10,899
1986–87	Div 2	42	11	17	14	47	59	50	19th	R4	R3	Full Members' Cup	R2	Wayne Clarke	19	7,426
1987–88	Div 2	44	11	15	18	41	66	48	19th	R5	R1	Full Members' Cup	R1	Steve Whitton	16	8,576
1988–89	Div 2 (Note: Relegated to the third tier of English football for the first time.) ↓	46	8	11	27	31	76	35	23rd	R3	R2	Full Members' Cup	R1	Steve Whitton	6	6,289
1989–90	Div 3	46	18	12	16	60	59	66	7th	R3	R2	Associate Members' Cup	Group	Dennis Bailey	20	8,558
1990–91	Div 3	46	16	17	13	45	49	65	12th (Note: Lowest League finish.)	R2	R1	Associate Members' Cup (Note: Beat Tranmere Rovers 3–2 in the final of what was better known by its sponsored name of the Leyland DAF Cup at Wembley.)	W	John Gayle; Simon Sturridge	10	7,030
1991–92	Div 3 ↑	46	23	12	11	69	52	81	2nd	R1	R3	Associate Members' Cup	Group	Nigel Gleghorn	22	12,399
1992–93	Div 1 (Note: The Second Division was renamed Division One after the FA Premiership broke away from the Football League.)	46	13	12	21	50	72	51	19th	R1	R1	Anglo-Italian Cup	R1	John Frain	8	12,328
1993–94	Div 1 ↓	46	13	12	21	52	69	51	22nd	R3	R2	Anglo-Italian Cup	Prelim	Paul Peschisolido; Andy Saville	10	14,378
1994–95	Div 2 ↑	46	25	14	7	84	37	89	1st	R3	R2	Football League Trophy (Note: Beat Carlisle United 1–0 in the final of what was better known by its sponsored name of the Auto Windscreens Shield at Wembley in front of a crowd of 76,663. The goal was scored by Paul Tait in sudden-death extra time. This was the first time a major tournament in England was decided on a golden goal.)	W	Steve Claridge	25	16,941
1995–96	Div 1	46	15	13	18	61	64	58	15th	R3	SF	Anglo-Italian Cup	QF	Jonathan Hunt	15	18,098
1996–97	Div 1	46	17	15	14	52	48	66	10th	R5	R2	—	—	Paul Devlin	19	17,732
1997–98	Div 1	46	19	17	10	60	35	74	7th (Note: Missed out on a play-off place to Sheffield United by virtue of goals scored, which took precedence over goal difference from the 1992–93 to the 1998–99 Football League seasons.)	R5	R3	—	—	Paul Furlong	19	18,751
1998–99	Div 1	46	23	12	11	66	37	81	4th (Note: Lost in the play-off semifinal to Watford on penalties.)	R3	R3	—	—	Dele Adebola	17	20,794
1999–2000	Div 1	46	22	11	13	65	44	77	5th (Note: Lost in the play-off semifinal to Barnsley on aggregate.)	R4	R4	—	—	Paul Furlong	11	21,895
2000–01	Div 1	46	23	9	14	59	48	78	5th (Note: Lost in the play-off semifinal to Preston North End on penalties.)	R3	F (Note: Lost to Liverpool on penalties after the game had finished 1–1 after extra time, in the first English final to be settled by a penalty shootout, and the first English football final to be held at the Millennium Stadium while the new Wembley Stadium was being built.)	—	—	Geoff Horsfield	12	21,283
2001–02	Div 1 ↑	46	21	13	12	70	49	76	5th (Note: Promoted to the Premier League via the play-offs, beating Millwall 2–1 on aggregate in the semifinal and Norwich City on penalties in the final after the game had finished 1–1 after extra time.)	R3	R3	—	—	Tommy Mooney	15	21,978
2002–03	Prem	38	13	9	16	41	49	48	13th	R3	R3	—	—	Stern John	9	28,831
2003–04	Prem	38	12	14	12	43	48	50	10th	R5	R2	—	—	Mikael Forssell	19	29,078
2004–05	Prem	38	11	12	15	40	46	45	12th	R4	R3	—	—	Emile Heskey	11	28,760
2005–06	Prem ↓	38	8	10	20	28	50	34	18th	QF	QF	—	—	Mikael Forssell; Jiří Jarošík	8	27,392
2006–07	Champ (Note: Division One was renamed The Championship from the 2004–05 season.) ↑	46	26	8	12	67	42	86	2nd	R4	R4	—	—	Gary McSheffrey	16	22,273
2007–08	Prem ↓	38	8	11	19	46	62	35	19th	R3	R3	—	—	Mikael Forssell	9	26,181
2008–09	Champ ↑	46	23	14	9	54	37	83	2nd	R3	R2	—	—	Kevin Phillips	14	19,081
2009–10	Prem	38	13	11	14	38	47	50	9th	QF	R3	—	—	Cameron Jerome	11	25,246
2010–11	Prem ↓	38	8	15	15	37	58	39	18th	QF	W (Note: Beat favourites Arsenal 2–1 at Wembley to win League Cup for the second time.)	—	—	Craig Gardner	10	25,461
2011–12	Champ	46	20	16	10	78	51	76	4th (Note: Lost in the play-off semifinal to Blackpool 3–2 on aggregate.)	R5	R3	UEFA Europa League (Note: Appearing in European competition for the first time in 50 years, courtesy of the 2011 League Cup win, Birmingham beat Nacional of Portugal in the 2011–12 Europa League play-off round to progress to the group stage. They finished third in Group H, one point behind Braga and Club Brugge, having beaten Brugge away and NK Maribor home and away.)	Group	Marlon King	18	19,126
2012–13	Champ	46	15	16	15	63	69	61	12th	R3	R2	—	—	Marlon King	14	16,702
2013–14	Champ	46	11	11	24	58	74	44	21st (Note: Avoided relegation on goal difference via Paul Caddis's stoppage-time equaliser at Bolton Wanderers in the last match of the season.)	R4	R4	—	—	Federico Macheda; Lee Novak	10	15,457
2014–15	Champ	46	16	15	15	54	64	63	10th	R4	R2	—	—	Clayton Donaldson	16	16,111
2015–16	Champ	46	16	15	15	53	49	63	10th	R3	R3	—	—	Clayton Donaldson	11	17,602
2016–17	Champ	46	13	14	19	45	64	53	19th	R3	R1	—	—	Lukas Jutkiewicz	12	18,717
2017–18	Champ	46	13	7	26	38	68	46	19th	R4	R2	—	—	Ché Adams	9	21,041
2018–19	Champ	46	14	19	13	64	58	52 (Note: Nine points deducted for breaches of the EFL's profitability and sustainability rules.)	17th	R3	R1	—	—	Ché Adams	22	22,483
2019–20	Champ	46	12	14	20	54	75	50	20th	R5	R1	—	—	Lukas Jutkiewicz	15	20,411 (Note: The 2019–20 season was interrupted for three months because of the COVID-19 pandemic before being completed behind closed doors; the average attendance only covers those matches played with spectators present.)
2020–21	Champ	46	13	13	20	37	61	52	18th	R3	R1	—	—	Lukas Jutkiewicz	8	0 (Note: Because of COVID restrictions, all Birmingham's 2020–21 home matches were played behind closed doors. Some clubs in lower-risk areas were able to admit fans, as a brief pilot in September and more widely in December, but Birmingham was in too high a tier to qualify.)
2021–22	Champ	46	11	14	21	50	75	47	20th	R3	R2	—	—	Scott Hogan	10	16,161 (Note: The lower tiers of two sides of Birmingham's stadium were closed for safety reasons for the whole of the 2021–22 and 2022–23 seasons and for part of 2023–24.)
2022–23	Champ	46	14	11	21	47	58	53	17th	R4	R1	—	—	Scott Hogan	10	16,758
2023–24	Champ ↓	46	13	11	22	50	65	50	22nd	R4	R2	—	—	Jay Stansfield	13	21,180
2024–25	League One ↑	46	34	9	3	84	31	111 (Note: Birmingham set a new EFL all-time points record with 111 points, surpassing the previous record of 106 points held by Reading.)	1st	R4	R2	EFL Trophy (Note: Lost 2–0 to Peterborough United in the final at Wembley in front of a crowd of 71,722. Peterborough successfully defended the trophy they had won the previous season.)	F	Jay Stansfield	23	26,283 (Note: Figure per ESPN FC source adjusted for their erroneous listing of 34,393 rather than 24,393 for the match against Rotherham United.)
2025–26	Champ	46	17	13	16	57	56	64	10th	R4	R2	—	—	Jay Stansfield; Marvin Ducksch	10	24,823

== Sources ==
- Matthews, Tony (1995). Birmingham City: A Complete Record. Derby: Breedon Books. ISBN 978-1-85983-010-9.
- Matthews, Tony (2000). The Encyclopedia of Birmingham City Football Club 1875–2000. Cradley Heath: Britespot. ISBN 978-0-9539288-0-4.
- Matthews, Tony (2010). Birmingham City: The Complete Record. Derby: Derby Books. ISBN 978-1-85983-853-2.
