= Jim Olney =

English footballer (1914–1944)

Personal information
- Full name: James Ferd Olney (Note: Although some sources, including the Commonwealth War Graves Commission, list Olney's middle name as Fred, multiple reliable primary and secondary sources confirm it to be Ferd, the same as his father's: the next-of-kin entry on his father's military papers; his police personnel file; his probate entry; the English National Football Archive; the commemorative plaque at Swindon Town F.C.'s ground.)
- Date of birth: 1 August 1914
- Place of birth: Birmingham, England
- Date of death: 14 September 1944 (aged 30)
- Place of death: Near the Dutch–Belgian border
- Height: 6 ft 2 in (1.88 m)
- Positions: Centre half; left half

Senior career*
Years	Team	Apps	(Gls)
- Tyseley Rangers
- Longbridge Albion
- Newbridge Athletic
193?–1936	Redditch		
1936–1938	Birmingham	3	(0)
1938–1944	Swindon Town	13	(0)
- * Club domestic league appearances and goals

James Ferd Olney (1 August 1914 – 14 September 1944), sometimes written as James Fred Olney, was an English professional footballer who played in the Football League for Birmingham and Swindon Town. He was killed on active service with the Coldstream Guards during the Second World War.

== Life and career ==
Olney was born in 1914 in St Bartholomew's Parish, Birmingham, the son of James Ferd Olney, a brass fitter, and his wife Harriet Florence née Brown. He had an older sister, Ivy May. His father's younger brother, Ben Olney, played football as a goalkeeper for Derby County, Aston Villa and England.

Olney played local football for clubs including Tyseley Rangers, Longbridge Albion, Newbridge Athletic and Redditch before joining First Division club Birmingham in March 1936. He began his Birmingham career with the reserve team in the Central League, and despite scoring an own goal against Sheffield Wednesday's reserves at the end of April – Birmingham won the match 8–3 – he was given his first-team and Football League debut a few days later in the last game of the 1935–36 season, a 3–1 home defeat against West Bromwich Albion.

He began the 1936–37 season back in the Birmingham Combination as captain of Birmingham's "A" team. He played twice for the first team that season, once in January and once in April, standing in for Tom Fillingham at centre half, but made no further appearances. He underwent knee cartilage surgery in January 1938, but even without the injury, he had been unable to displace Fillingham from the regular starting eleven: they played in a similar style, but Olney "lacked the destructive abilities" of the more experienced man. Fillingham was given a free transfer at the end of the season, while Olney was retained. Several men were used at centre-half in the first few months of the 1938–39 season, but Olney was not, and in December 1938 he moved to Third Division South club Swindon Town.

Olney played twice for Swindon's Southern League team before making his first-team debut on 17 December, coming into the side at left half in place of the injured Stan Wilcockson to face Exeter City at home. Swindon won 2–1, and, according to the Football Pink, Olney "seemed to be on the slow side at the start, but he speeded up appreciably and his distribution of the ball was of a high order." He made eight more appearances over the next couple of months before Wilcockson regained possession of the left-half position until his injured ankle allowed Olney to play in the last match of the season. His powerful free kick was headed home by Ben Morton to open the scoring in a 3–1 win against Torquay United that secured his team a ninth-place finish. He played in the first three matches of the 1939–40 season, which was then abandoned because of the Second World War.

Olney returned to Birmingham, where the 1939 Register lists him as a professional footballer and Birmingham City Police reservist living with his widowed mother, a canteen worker, and his sister, a sewing machinist, in Colonial Road, Bordesley Green. He left the police at his own request in June 1940, and joined the Army. Olney served as a Lance-Serjeant in the 5th Battalion, Coldstream Guards, and was killed in action near the Dutch–Belgian border on 14 September 1944, at the age of 30. He was buried in Geel War Cemetery and commemorated at the County Ground, Swindon.

== Career statistics ==
Appearances and goals by club, season and competition
Club	Season	League			FA Cup		Total	
Club	Season	Division	Apps	Goals	Apps	Goals	Apps	Goals
Birmingham	1935–36	First Division	1	0	—		1	0
Birmingham	1936–37	First Division	2	0	0	0	2	0
Birmingham	1937–38	First Division	0	0	0	0	0	0
Birmingham	1938–39	First Division	0	0	—		0	0
Birmingham	Total		3	0	0	0	3	0
Swindon Town	1938–39	Third Division South	10	0	0	0	10	0
Swindon Town	1939–40	Third Division South	3	0	—		13	0
Swindon Town	Total		13	0	0	0	13	0
Career total			16	0	0	0	16	0

== Sources ==
- Matthews, Tony (1995). Birmingham City: A Complete Record. Derby: Breedon Books. ISBN 978-1-85983-010-9.
