= Ray Crawshaw =

English footballer (1908–1974)

Personal information
- Full name: Raymond Crawshaw
- Date of birth: 12 August 1908
- Place of birth: Padiham, Lancashire, England
- Date of death: 31 December 1974 (aged 66)
- Place of death: Burnley, Lancashire, England
- Height: 6 ft 1/2 in (1.84 m)
- Position: Centre half

Senior career*
Years	Team	Apps	(Gls)
–	Great Harwood		
1929–1930	Southport	0	(0)
1930–1931	Great Harwood		
1931–1932	Burnley	0	(0)
1932–1933	Great Harwood		
1933–1934	Accrington Stanley	19	(0)
1934–1935	Birmingham	4	(0)
1935–1936	Bromsgrove Rovers		
- * Club domestic league appearances and goals

Raymond Crawshaw (12 August 1908 – 31 December 1974) was an English professional footballer who played in the Football League for Accrington Stanley and Birmingham. He played as a centre half.

Crawshaw was born in Padiham, Lancashire. He began his football career with local team Great Harwood, and had spells with Southport and Burnley, but without playing in the Football League. He joined Accrington Stanley in 1933, and played 19 games in the Third Division North before moving to First Division club Birmingham in April 1934 for a fee of £600. The form of George Morrall and Tom Fillingham restricted Crawshaw's appearances to four, and he returned to non-league football in 1934.
