= Harry Hibbs =

Harry Hibbs may refer to:

- Harry Hibbs (footballer) (1906–1984), English football goalkeeper
- Harry Hibbs (musician) (1942–1989), Newfoundland traditional musician

== See also ==
- Henry Hibbs (disambiguation)
