= Henry Hibbs =

Henry Hibbs may refer to:

- Harry Hibbs (footballer) (1906–1984), English football goalkeeper
- Henry C. Hibbs (1882–1949), American architect

== See also ==
- Harry Hibbs (disambiguation)
