= Dick Butler =

Dick Butler may refer to:

- Dick Butler (ice hockey) (1926–2000), Canadian ice hockey right wing
- Dick Butler (footballer) (1911–1984), English footballer
- Dick Butler (baseball) (1869–1917), Major League Baseball catcher
