= Percy Grosvenor =

English footballer

Personal information
- Date of birth: 17 March 1911
- Place of birth: Netherton, England
- Date of death: 1999 (aged 88)
- Height: 5 ft 10 in (1.78 m)
- Position: Defender

Senior career*
Years	Team	Apps	(Gls)
- Dudley Works
- Evesham Town
1933–1939	Leicester City	169	(1)
- * Club domestic league appearances and goals

Percy Grosvenor (17 March 1911 – 1999) was an English footballer who played in the Football League for Leicester City. His brother Tom was also a professional footballer. Percy's father Sidney played for Wolverhampton Wanderers in 1904/05, before moving to Crewe Alexandra, Walsall and Worcester City.

His elder brother Tom was a creative inside-right who played for Birmingham City, Sheffield Wednesday, and Bolton Wanderers, as well as playing for England in 1933 against Ireland, Wales, and France.

Percy's younger brother Clifford, who died aged 29 in 1943, joined Leicester as a reserve for the 1937/38 season. As for Percy, he started his career playing for Dudley Works before becoming an amateur at Birmingham City, having trials at West Bromwich Albion and playing briefly for Evesham Town.

When Peter Hodge returned to Filbert Street for his second spell as manager in March 1932, he made 22-year-old Percy his first signing, seeing him as an understudy to left-half George Ritchie.

A Topical Times publication from the 1930s entitled '1500 Football Stars and All About Them' gives Percy's weight and height as 11-and-a-half stone and five feet-10-and-a-half inches respectively.

Percy had to wait nine months for his debut, in a 1-1 draw at Villa Park. He then remained in the side in an undefeated run of 13 consecutive league and cup matches, which saw Leicester improve its position in the top flight and reach the Club's first-ever FA Cup Semi-Final, which they lost 4-1 to Portsmouth.

From 1934/35 until the outbreak of the Second World War, Percy was a member of the City side.

The team was relegated from the top flight in 1935, won the Second Division title in 1937 and was then relegated in 1939 before taking part in the Wartime Regional Leagues. Throughout this time, Percy was a key player who was dedicated to the Club's cause.

Following the outbreak of the Second World War, Percy made five appearances in the Wartime Regional League Midland Division during the 1939/40 season, as well as appearing as a guest for Northampton Town. He then retired from professional football. Percy died in Dudley in 1999, aged 88.
