= Melvyn Millington =

English footballer (1911–1985)

Personal information
- Date of birth: 22 October 1911
- Place of birth: Derbyshire
- Date of death: 7 December 1985
- Place of death: Lincolnshire
- Position: Centre half

Senior career*
Years	Team	Apps	(Gls)
- Frickley
1933–1934	Rotherham United	2	(0)
1934–1935	Torquay United		
- * Club domestic league appearances and goals

Melvyn Millington (22 September 1911 – 7 December 1985) was an English professional footballer who played as a centre back for Frickley, Rotherham United and Torquay United. Millington started his career at Frickley in the Midland League, before transferring to Rotherham United for the 1933–1934 season, making two appearances, before successfully completing a trial at Torquay United with former Frickley teammate Albert Clarke in 1934. Millington left Torquay after the 1934–1935 season.
