= Charlie Calladine =

English footballer (1911–1983)

Personal information
- Full name: Charles Frederick Calladine
- Date of birth: 24 January 1911
- Place of birth: Wessington, England
- Date of death: 29 October 1983 (aged 72)
- Place of death: Matlock, England
- Height: 5 ft 9 in (1.75 m)
- Positions: Inside forward; wing half

Senior career*
Years	Team	Apps	(Gls)
192?–1929	Wessington Ivanhoe		
1929–1930	Scunthorpe & Lindsey United		(23)
1930–1936	Birmingham	114	(5)
1936–1938	Blackburn Rovers	48	(6)
1938–194?	Guildford City		
- * Club domestic league appearances and goals

Charles Frederick Calladine (24 January 1911 – 29 October 1983) was an English professional footballer who made 162 appearances in the Football League for Birmingham and Blackburn Rovers. An inside forward or wing half, Calladine also played senior football with Midland League club Scunthorpe & Lindsey United and Guildford City of the Southern League.

== Personal life ==
Calladine was born in 1911 in Wessington, Derbyshire, a son of Samuel Calladine, a coal miner, and his wife Mary Ann née Riley. Calladine was the nephew of another Charles Frederick Calladine, his father's younger brother, who played league football as an outside left for Notts County in 1907–08 and was killed in action during the First World War while serving as a tunneller. Calladine himself served in the Royal Artillery during the Second World War.

He was a resident of Holloway, near Matlock in Derbyshire, when he died in 1983 at the age of 72.

== Football career ==
In December 1928, the Derbyshire Times described the 17-year-old Calladine, who had just scored five goals in a match for his village club, Wessington Ivanhoe of the Matlock and District League, as "a promising young player, on whom several higher class clubs have an eye." By the end of the season, he was playing in the Midland League for Scunthorpe & Lindsey United, and his goalscoring from the inside-left position – notably his contributions to their progress in the 1929–30 FA Cup, in which they reached the rounds proper for the first time in the club's history – prompted the Derby Daily Telegraph's "Walters" to opine that he "[could] not see [Scunthorpe] retaining him much longer." They did keep him for the rest of the season, which he finished as the club's top league goalscorer, jointly with Bill Baldwin and Jackie Beynon, with 23 goals, but he then signed for Football League First Division club Birmingham.

Calladine made his Football League debut on 11 April 1931 away to Huddersfield Town, playing at centre forward in a 1–0 defeat. He played twice the following season, again in the forward line, but did not reappear for another twelve months. When Jimmy Cringan was injured ahead of a demanding Christmas programme of matches, Calladine was selected at left half for the visit of Portsmouth on 24 December 1932. Birmingham won 4–0, and Calladine had found his position. Described as a physically strong player, vigorous in style, with a powerful shot, and possessing "quickness and cleverness", he missed only one match in what remained of the season. In March 1933, the Sheffield-based Daily Independent reported that he was "being regarded as a candidate for the left half position in the England team." He was ever-present in Birmingham's 1933–34 season and missed four matches in the next. After the first seven matches of the 1935–36 season produced only one win, Calladine lost his place, and when the team started winning, he did not get it back. He played twice more, on the left wing, and scored once, in a draw away to Derby County on 16 November which was the last of his 126 appearances for Birmingham.

In February 1936, Calladine joined another First Division club, Blackburn Rovers. He initially displaced Wally Halsall from the half-back line but was also used at inside right before dropping out of the side entirely for the last few matches of the season, at the end of which Blackburn were relegated to the Second Division. He played at left half for the first couple of months of the 1936–37 season, and spent the second half of the campaign as a forward, scoring six times from 16 matches at inside left. He played the first six weeks of 1937–38 at right half, but rarely appeared after that, and Blackburn agreed terms with another Second Division club, Swansea Town, for his transfer. However, maybe in ignorance of the club's arrangements, Calladine signed for Southern League club Guildford City. He helped Guildford finish as runners-up in the 1938–39 Southern League, and signed on for the following season, which was abandoned soon after the start of the Second World War.

== Career statistics ==
Appearances and goals by club, season and competition
Club	Season	League			FA Cup		Total	
Club	Season	Division	Apps	Goals	Apps	Goals	Apps	Goals
Birmingham	1930–31	First Division	1	0	0	0	1	0
Birmingham	1931–32	First Division	2	0	0	0	2	0
Birmingham	1932–33	First Division	22	1	5	0	27	1
Birmingham	1933–34	First Division	42	2	3	0	45	2
Birmingham	1934–35	First Division	38	1	4	0	42	1
Birmingham	1935–36	First Division	9	1	0	0	9	1
Birmingham	Total		114	5	12	0	126	5
Blackburn Rovers	1935–36	First Division	10	1	0	0	10	1
Blackburn Rovers	1936–37	Second Division	25	5	1	1	26	6
Blackburn Rovers	1937–38	Second Division	13	0	0	0	13	0
Blackburn Rovers	Total		48	6	1	1	49	7
Career total			162	11	13	1	175	12

== Sources ==
- Matthews, Tony (2010). Birmingham City: The Complete Record. Derby: Derby Books. ISBN 978-1-85983-853-2.
