= Fred Jones (footballer, born 1910) =

English footballer

Personal information
- Date of birth: 1910
- Place of birth: Halesowen, England
- Height: 5 ft 7 1/2 in (1.71 m)
- Position: Inside forward

Senior career*
Years	Team	Apps	(Gls)
- Old Hill White Star
- Halesowen Town
1932–1934	Leeds United	0	(0)
1934–1935	Birmingham	1	(0)
1935–1936	Cheltenham Town		
- * Club domestic league appearances and goals

Frederick R. Jones (1910 – after 1936) was an English professional footballer who played in the Football League for Birmingham.

Jones was born in 1910 in Halesowen, which was then part of Worcestershire. An inside forward, he played local football for Halesowen Town and had a trial with Huddersfield Town before joining Leeds United. Jones moved on to Birmingham in 1934 without playing first-team football for Leeds. Described as "an enterprising forward, not afraid to make an unorthodox move when he thinks the occasion warrants it", Jones made his debut – the only game he played for Birmingham's first team – in the First Division on 1 September 1934, as a late replacement for the injured Joe Bradford in a game at Stoke City which Birmingham lost 2–0. (Note: Sources including Michael Joyce's Football League Players' Records 1888 to 1939 appear to attribute this game to Wilson Jones, who had not joined Birmingham by then.) Jones later played for Cheltenham Town.
