= Willie Steel =

Scottish footballer and manager

Personal information
- Full name: William Gilbert Steel
- Date of birth: 6 February 1908
- Place of birth: Blantyre, Scotland
- Date of death: 1990 (aged 81–82)
- Height: 5 ft 7 in (1.70 m)
- Position: Full back

Senior career*
Years	Team	Apps	(Gls)
- Bridgeton Waverley
1926–1931	St Johnstone	162	(0)
1931–1935	Liverpool	120	(0)
1935–1939	Birmingham	91	(0)
1939	Derby County	11	(0)

Managerial career
- 1954–1963: Airdrieonians
- 1963–1964: Third Lanark
- * Club domestic league appearances and goals

William Gilbert Steel (6 February 1908 – 1990) was a Scottish footballer who played in the English Football League for Liverpool, Birmingham and Derby County.

== Life and playing career ==
Born in Blantyre, Lanarkshire, Steel played for Bridgeton Waverley and St Johnstone before being signed by Liverpool manager George Patterson in September 1931. He made his debut on 19 December 1931 in a Football League First Division match at Anfield. Derby County were the visitors and they returned to the Baseball Ground with a point following a 1–1 draw.

Steel broke into the team at full-back three months after signing, and stayed there for the rest of the season missing just one game. He followed this up with an ever-present season in 1932–33 and missed just two games of the next campaign.

He had established himself as the first choice right-back until during the 1934–35 season he lost the position to Robert Done. Done lasted for only one match, but instead of being replaced by Steel it was Tom Cooper who slotted in to the position.

Steel was allowed to leave during March 1935 when he joined Birmingham. He subsequently went on to play for Derby County before ending his career, with a guest spell at Dumbarton during World War II.

After the war, he was manager of Airdrieonians for nine years, then Third Lanark for one year.

== Career details ==
Appearances and goals by club, season and competition
Club	Season	League			FA Cup		Others		Total	
Club	Season	Division	Apps	Goals	Apps	Goals	Apps	Goals	Apps	Goals
Liverpool	1931–32	First Division	22	0	4	0	0	0	26	0
Liverpool	1932–33	First Division	42	0	1	0	0	0	43	0
Liverpool	1933–34	First Division	40	0	3	0	0	0	43	0
Liverpool	1934–35	First Division	16	0	0	0	0	0	16	0
Liverpool	Total		120	0	8	0	0	0	128	0
Birmingham	1934–35	First Division	11	0	0	0	0	0	11	0
Birmingham	1935–36	First Division	36	0	1	0	0	0	37	0
Birmingham	1936–37	First Division	17	0	0	0	0	0	17	0
Birmingham	1937–38	First Division	16	0	0	0	0	0	16	0
Birmingham	1938–39	First Division	11	0	0	0	0	0	11	0
Birmingham	Total		91	0	1	0	0	0	92	0
Derby County	1938–39	First Division	11	0	0	0	0	0	11	0
Career total			222	0	9	0	0	0	231	0
