= Arthur Hubbard =

English footballer (1911–1972)

Personal information
- Date of birth: 8 April 1911
- Place of birth: Aston, England
- Date of death: 1972 (aged 61)
- Place of death: Solihull, England
- Height: 5 ft 8 in (1.73 m)
- Position: Left back

Senior career*
Years	Team	Apps	(Gls)
- Moor Green
- Wright & Eagle Range Co.
1932–1935	Birmingham	5	(0)
1935–1939	Luton Town	4	(0)
1939–19??	Dunstable Town		
- * Club domestic league appearances and goals

Arthur George Hubbard (8 April 1911 – 1972) was an English professional footballer who played in the Football League for Birmingham and Luton Town. He played as a left back.

== Biography ==
Hubbard was born in the Erdington district of Birmingham and attended Chester Road School. Birmingham signed him from his works team in August 1932, initially on an amateur basis: he turned professional six months later. He made his debut in the First Division on the opening day of the 1934–35 season, deputising for the injured Ned Barkas in a home game against local rivals Aston Villa which Birmingham won 2–1. He played in the next four games before losing his place to Tom Fillingham, and, once Barkas returned to fitness, not regaining it. At the end of the season Hubbard, described as a solid full-back, joined Luton Town of the Third Division South, where he played only four league games, and in 1939 moved into non-league football with Dunstable Town.

He was chosen once for an FA Amateur XI.
