= Charlie Calladine (footballer, born 1888) =

English footballer (1888–1916)

Personal information
- Full name: Charles Frederick Calladine
- Date of birth: 1888
- Place of birth: Wessington, England
- Date of death: 1 June 1916 (aged 28)
- Place of death: near Fricourt, France
- Position: Outside left

Senior career*
Years	Team	Apps	(Gls)
190?–1907	Notts Olympic		
1907–1909	Notts County	3	(0)
1909–1910	Ilkeston United		(11)
1910–191?	Sutton Town		
- * Club domestic league appearances and goals

Charles Frederick Calladine (1888 – 1 June 1916) was an English professional footballer who played as an outside left in the Football League for Notts County. He was killed in action serving as a tunneller during the First World War.

== Life and career ==
Calladine was born in early 1888 in Wessington, Derbyshire, a son of Henry Thomas (Harry) Calladine, a coal miner, and his wife Elizabeth. The 1911 Census finds him unmarried, living with his widowed father and a younger sister in Wessington, and working as a miner. A nephew, the son of his older brother Samuel, also named Charles Frederick Calladine, became a professional footballer who played more than 150 league matches for Birmingham and Blackburn Rovers in the 1930s.

The 19-year-old Calladine joined First Division club Notts County from Notts Olympic in late 1907. He played for Notts' reserves, who like Olympic were members of the Notts and District League, and made his Football League debut on 28 December at home to Bolton Wanderers, brought into the side to cover for players rested after matches on three consecutive days over the Christmas period. Notts lost 1–0, Calladine played at outside right, and according to the Athletic News, it was his nervousness that weakened the right side of the attack: "He is a well-built youth, who ... possesses speed and ability, but had not the slightest confidence in himself on Saturday." Injury to Jerry Dean allowed him two more appearances in March 1908, in a draw at home to Liverpool and a defeat at Middlesbrough.

He was retained for the 1908–09 season, but played no more first-team football, appearing only for the reserves in the Midland League. Calladine then signed for Ilkeston United, for which he scored 11 goals to help his team finish third in the 1909–10 Notts & Derbyshire League, before moving on to Sutton Town

In February 1915, Calladine left his job at Wingfield Manor Colliery to enlist in the Sherwood Foresters. He was also with the Cheshire Regiment before serving as a sapper with the 178th Tunnelling Company of the Royal Engineers, laying mines in the Fricourt area of the Somme. He was one of eight men of that company killed on 1 June 1916 when a German mine blew, and is commemorated on the Thiepval Memorial.
