= Ernie Richardson (footballer) =

English footballer

Personal information
- Full name: Ernest William Richardson
- Date of birth: 8 March 1916
- Place of birth: Bishop Burton, England
- Date of death: 1977 (aged 60–61)
- Height: 5 ft 5 in (1.65 m)
- Position: Outside right

Senior career*
| Years | Team | Apps | (Gls) |
- Leven (Yorkshire)
| 1936–1938 | Birmingham | 3 | (0) |
| 1938–1939 | Swansea Town | 18 | (2) |
- * Club domestic league appearances and goals

Ernest William Richardson (8 March 1916 – 1977) was an English professional footballer who played in the Football League for Birmingham and Swansea Town.

Richardson was born in Bishop Burton in the East Riding of Yorkshire. He began his football career with nearby Leven before joining Birmingham in 1936, and made his debut in the First Division on 22 April 1936 in a 4–1 home win against Sheffield Wednesday. Richardson, a small but very pacy outside right, found himself behind Frank White and Dennis Jennings in the pecking order, and played only twice more for the first team. He joined Swansea Town in November 1938, where he scored twice in 18 Second Division appearances.
