= Dick Butler (footballer) =

English footballer

Personal information
- Full name: Herbert Butler
- Date of birth: 18 November 1911
- Place of birth: Eastwood, England
- Date of death: June 1984 (aged 72)
- Place of death: Bestwood, England
- Height: 6 ft 0 in (1.83 m)
- Position: Centre half

Senior career*
Years	Team	Apps	(Gls)
–	Bestwood Colliery		
1933–1939	Birmingham	10	(0)
1939	Crewe Alexandra	6	(0)
- * Club domestic league appearances and goals

Herbert Butler (18 November 1911 – June 1984), commonly known as Dick Butler, was an English professional footballer who played in the Football League for Birmingham and Crewe Alexandra.

Butler was born in Eastwood, Nottinghamshire. A centre half, he began his football career with Bestwood Colliery before joining Birmingham in May 1933. Because of the consistency of George Morrall and then of Tom Fillingham, Butler did not make his first-team debut until 12 September 1936, deputising for Fillingham in the First Division game at home to Stoke City which Birmingham lost 4–2. In nearly six years with the club, Butler was a major player for the reserve team in the Central League, but appeared only 11 times for the first team. In March 1939 he joined Crewe Alexandra, but played only six league games before the Second World War put an end to his professional career. During the war he made guest appearances for West Bromwich Albion.

Butler died in Bestwood, Nottinghamshire in 1984 at the age of 72.
