= Harry Holmes (footballer) =

English footballer

Personal information
- Full name: William Harold Holmes
- Date of birth: 16 August 1908
- Place of birth: Ambergate, Belper, England
- Date of death: 1993 (aged 84–85)
- Position: Outside right

Senior career*
Years	Team	Apps	(Gls)
- Heanor Town
1931–1933	Coventry City	22	(12)
1933	Heanor Town		
1933–1934	Notts County	2	(0)
1934	Heanor Town		
1934–1935	Birmingham	1	(0)
1935–19??	Heanor Town		
- * Club domestic league appearances and goals

William Harold "Harry" Holmes (18 August 1908 – 1993) was an English footballer who played in the Football League as an outside right for Coventry City, Notts County and Birmingham.

Holmes was born in Ambergate, Belper, Derbyshire. Unwilling to put football ahead of his career as a draughtsman, he retained his amateur status, and alternated his Football League games with playing for his local club Heanor Town. He was the last amateur to play first-team football for Birmingham, which he did in November 1934.
