= Sid Moffat =

English footballer (1910–1981)

Personal information
- Full name: Sidney Hugh Moffat
- Date of birth: 16 September 1910
- Place of birth: Congleton, England
- Date of death: 20 September 1981 (aged 71)
- Place of death: Macclesfield, England
- Height: 5 ft 10 in (1.78 m)
- Position: Outside right

Senior career*
Years	Team	Apps	(Gls)
1930–1933	Congleton Town	21	(8)
1933–1936	Birmingham	18	(3)
1936–1937	Millwall	2	(0)
- * Club domestic league appearances and goals

Sidney Hugh Moffat (16 September 1910 – 20 September 1981) was an English professional footballer who made 20 appearances in the Football League playing for Birmingham and Millwall. He played as an outside right.

Moffat was born in Congleton, Cheshire, the son of Hugh Moffat, the Burnley, Oldham Athletic and England wing half. He began his football career with Congleton Town before joining First Division club Birmingham in 1933. He opened the scoring on his debut, on 17 March 1934 in a 4–1 defeat at Liverpool, a game in which Birmingham's England international goalkeeper Harry Hibbs was injured after 55 minutes and had to leave the field. Moffat, a pacy player who liked to cut inside and shoot, played regularly for the rest of the 1934–35 season and at the start of the next, but lost his place thereafter. In 1936 he signed for Millwall but failed to settle, playing only twice and leaving at the end of the season.

Moffat died in Macclesfield, Cheshire, in 1981 at the age of 71.
