= David Jones (footballer, born 1910) =

Welsh footballer (1910–1971)

Personal information
- Full name: David Owen Jones
- Date of birth: 28 October 1910
- Place of birth: Cardiff, Wales
- Date of death: 25 May 1971 (aged 60)
- Place of death: Oadby, England
- Height: 5 ft 10 in (1.78 m)
- Position: Defender

Senior career*
Years	Team	Apps	(Gls)
–1933	Ebbw Vale		
1931–1933	Leyton Orient	55	(0)
1933–1947	Leicester City	226	(4)
1947–1949	Mansfield Town	74	(0)
1949–19??	Hinckley Athletic		

International career
1933–1937	Wales	7	(0)
- * Club domestic league appearances and goals

David Owen Jones (28 October 1910 – 25 May 1971) was a Welsh footballer who played as a defender. He was part of the Wales national team between 1933 and 1937 playing seven matches. He played his first match on 4 November 1933 against Ireland and his last match on 17 March 1937 against Ireland.
