= Ernie Sykes =

English footballer

Personal information
- Full name: Ernest Alfred Sykes
- Date of birth: 27 December 1915
- Place of birth: Temple Normanton, England
- Date of death: 1997 (aged 81–82)
- Height: 5 ft 11 1/2 in (1.82 m)
- Position: Full back

Senior career*
Years	Team	Apps	(Gls)
- Sutton Town
1936–1939	Birmingham	8	(0)
1939–1944	Cardiff City	0	(0)
- * Club domestic league appearances and goals

Ernest Alfred Sykes (27 December 1915 – 1997) was an English professional footballer who made eight appearances in the First Division of the Football League playing for Birmingham. He played as a full back.

Sykes was born in Temple Normanton, Derbyshire. He played for Sutton Town before joining Birmingham in March 1936. He made his debut on 10 April 1936, in a 2–2 draw at home to Manchester United. Sykes played only rarely over the next two seasons, and moved to Cardiff City in the 1939 close season. He played only three games for the club before the Football League was suspended for the duration of the Second World War, and retired in 1944.
