= Joe Loughran =

English footballer (1915–1994)

Personal information
- Full name: Joseph Loughran
- Date of birth: 12 August 1915
- Place of birth: Consett, England
- Date of death: 23 August 1994 (aged 79)
- Height: 5 ft 7 1/2 in (1.71 m)
- Position: Wing half

Youth career
- Medomsley Juniors
- Dudley College

Senior career*
Years	Team	Apps	(Gls)
1933–1937	Birmingham	31	(2)
1937–1939	Luton Town	25	(0)
1939–1949	Burnley	65	(0)
1949–1953	Southend United	147	(1)
1953–19??	Newhaven		
- * Club domestic league appearances and goals

Joseph Loughran (12 August 1915 – 23 August 1994) was an English professional footballer who scored three goals in 268 appearances in the Football League playing for Birmingham, Luton Town, Burnley and Southend United. He played as a wing half.

Loughran was born in Consett, County Durham, and was a physical education student when he joined Birmingham in August 1933. He made his debut in the First Division on 5 October 1935, in a 2–1 home win against Chelsea, and played regularly during the 1935–36 season. Appearances were harder to come by the following season, at the end of which he moved on to Luton Town. He later played for Burnley, and then for Southend United, finally retiring in May 1953 at the age of nearly 38 after playing more than 150 games for the club.

After his playing career ended he worked as a schools' physical education advisor in East Sussex. He died on 23 August 1994, aged 79.
