= Francis McGurk =

Scottish footballer

Personal information
- Full name: Francis Reynolds McGurk
- Date of birth: 15 January 1909
- Place of birth: Hamilton, Scotland
- Date of death: 2 March 1978 (aged 69)
- Place of death: Birmingham, England
- Position: Outside right

Senior career*
Years	Team	Apps	(Gls)
- Blantyre Celtic
1931–1933	Clyde	74	(19)
1933–1935	Birmingham	19	(2)
1935–1936	Bristol City	3	(0)
1936–19??	Whittaker Ellis		

International career
1933	Scotland	1	(0)
- * Club domestic league appearances and goals

Francis Reynolds McGurk (15 January 1909 – 2 March 1978) was a Scotland international footballer who played in the Scottish Football League for Clyde and made 22 appearances in the English Football League playing for Birmingham and Bristol City. He played as an outside right.

McGurk was born in Eddlewood, Hamilton. He began his football career with junior club Blantyre Celtic before joining Clyde of the Scottish Football League First Division in 1931. He made a name for himself as a goalscorer, and in the 1933 close season moved to England to join Football League First Division side Birmingham. Though he showed no signs of enhancing his goalscoring reputation, his dribbling attracted the attention of the Scotland national selectors. After only two years as a professional, McGurk won his first and only international cap, on 4 October 1933, in a 3–2 defeat to Wales at Ninian Park in the British Home Championship. After two years with Birmingham, in which time he played only 19 games, McGurk left for Bristol City, and a few months after that he was playing in the Birmingham Works League for Whittaker Ellis.

McGurk died in Birmingham in 1978 at the age of 69.
