= Jack Thorogood =

English footballer (1911–1970)

Personal information
- Full name: Jack Thorogood
- Date of birth: 4 April 1911
- Place of birth: Dinnington, England
- Date of death: 1970 (aged 59)
- Place of death: Bridlington, England
- Height: 5 ft 6 1/4 in (1.68 m)
- Position: Outside left

Senior career*
Years	Team	Apps	(Gls)
19??–1930	Frickley Colliery		
1930–1934	Birmingham	23	(2)
1934–1939	Millwall	75	(24)
1939	Doncaster Rovers	0	(0)
- * Club domestic league appearances and goals

Jack Thorogood (4 April 1911 – 1970) was an English professional footballer who scored 26 goals in 98 appearances in the Football League playing for Birmingham and Millwall. He played as an outside left.

== Life and career ==
Thorogood was born in Dinnington, Yorkshire. He began his football career with Frickley Colliery before joining Birmingham of the Football League First Division in November 1930. He made his debut on 6 December 1930 in a 2–0 win at home to Huddersfield Town, but was unable to dislodge Ernie Curtis from the starting eleven. Even when Curtis left, Thorogood failed to impose himself, and in the 1934 close season he moved to Millwall, where he benefited from regular football to score at a rate of a goal every three games. He scored Millwall's 1000th Football League goal, against Gillingham in 1935–36, and was part of their giant-killing FA Cup team the following season. He signed for Doncaster Rovers shortly before the Second World War, and made guest appearances for several clubs during the war.

After retiring from football Thorogood took up tennis. He won the Doncaster Tennis Cup at least twice and played in the Yorkshire Lawn Tennis Championships.

Thorogood died in Bridlington, Yorkshire, in 1970 at the age of 59.
