= Joe Devine =

Scottish footballer and manager (1905–1980)

Personal information
- Full name: Joseph Cassidy Devine
- Date of birth: 8 September 1905
- Place of birth: Motherwell, Scotland
- Date of death: 1980 (aged 74–75)
- Place of death: Chesterfield, England
- Height: 5 ft 8 in (1.73 m)
- Positions: Inside forward; wing half

Youth career
- Motherwell Watsonians
- Cleland Juniors

Senior career*
| Years | Team | Apps | (Gls) |
| 1923–1925 | Bathgate | 43 | (11) |
| 1925–1930 | Burnley | 114 | (27) |
| 1930–1931 | Newcastle United | 22 | (11) |
| 1931–1933 | Sunderland | 67 | (7) |
| 1933–1935 | Queens Park Rangers | 57 | (9) |
| 1935–1937 | Birmingham | 55 | (2) |
| 1937–1938 | Chesterfield | 23 | (0) |

Managerial career
- 1939: Valur
- 1948: Valur
- 1948: Iceland
- * Club domestic league appearances and goals

Joseph Cassidy Devine (8 September 1905 – 1980) was a Scottish professional footballer born in Motherwell, who played as an inside forward or wing half. He represented Bathgate in the Scottish Football League, and made nearly 350 appearances in the English Football League in England playing for Burnley, Newcastle United, Sunderland, Queens Park Rangers, Birmingham and Chesterfield.

After his playing career, he became manager of Valur and Iceland.
