= Fred Roberts (footballer, born 1909) =

English footballer (1909–1979)

Personal information
- Full name: Frederick Roberts
- Date of birth: 9 October 1909
- Place of birth: West Bromwich, England
- Date of death: January 1979 (aged 69)
- Place of death: Luton, England
- Height: 5 ft 8 1/2 in (1.74 m)
- Position: Forward

Senior career*
Years	Team	Apps	(Gls)
- Smethwick Highfield
- Thomas Pigott's Works
1933–1934	Birmingham	29	(9)
1934–1945	Luton Town	180	(38)
1945–1948	Kettering Town		
- * Club domestic league appearances and goals

Frederick Roberts (9 October 1909 – January 1979) was an English professional footballer who played as a forward in the Football League for Birmingham and Luton Town.

Roberts was born in Greets Green, West Bromwich, Staffordshire. He signed for Birmingham in 1933, and in his first season, 1933–34, was the club's top scorer, though with only eight goals in a struggling side. The following season, he moved to Luton Town where he remained until 1945, making 180 appearances in the Football League and helping the club to the championship of the Third Division South in the 1936–37 season. During the Second World War Roberts remained at Luton, but played wartime guest football for other clubs, including Watford. After leaving Luton he had three seasons at Kettering Town. He died in Luton at the age of 69.

== Honours ==
Birmingham

- Top scorer: 1933–34

Luton Town

- Third Division South champions: 1936–37
