= Albert Clarke =

English footballer (1916–1944)

Personal information
- Date of birth: 25 December 1916
- Place of birth: Sheffield, England
- Date of death: 16 June 1944 (aged 27)
- Place of death: France
- Height: 5 ft 6 in (1.68 m)
- Position: Forward

Senior career*
Years	Team	Apps	(Gls)
–	Mexborough Town		
–	Frickley Colliery		
1934–1936	Torquay United	12	(9)
1936–1938	Birmingham	31	(9)
1938–1944	Blackburn Rovers	41	(21)
- * Club domestic league appearances and goals

Albert W. Clarke (25 December 1916 – 16 June 1944) was an English professional footballer who played as a forward. He scored 39 goals in 84 appearances in the Football League playing for Torquay United, Birmingham and Blackburn Rovers.

Clarke was born in Sheffield, and began his football career with Mexborough Town and Frickley Colliery. Together with Frickley teammate Melvyn Millington, he turned professional with Torquay United of the Third Division South after a successful trial. He spent 16 months with Torquay before moving to First Division club Birmingham in 1936. Before the 1938–39 season he moved again, joining Blackburn Rovers in exchange for Wally Halsall. He averaged a goal every other game for Blackburn, helping them to the Second Division title, before the Football League was suspended on the outbreak of the Second World War. During the war he made guest appearances for Torquay and was a finalist in the 1939–40 War League Cup with Blackburn. He died in 1944 on active service in France with the 12th Battalion, Devonshire Regiment, part of the 6th Airlanding Brigade of the 6th Airborne Division.
