= Don Dearson =

Welsh footballer (1914–1990)

Personal information
- Full name: Donald John Dearson
- Date of birth: 13 May 1914
- Place of birth: Ynysybwl, Wales
- Date of death: 24 December 1990 (aged 76)
- Place of death: Birmingham, England
- Height: 5 ft 10 in (1.78 m)
- Position: Utility player

Youth career
- –1932: Llantwit Major
- 1932–1934: Barry

Senior career*
Years	Team	Apps	(Gls)
1934–1947	Birmingham City	131	(17)
1947–1950	Coventry City	84	(10)
1950–1951	Walsall	51	(13)
1951–1952	Nuneaton Borough		
1952–1953	Bilston		

International career
1938–1939	Wales	3	(0)
- * Club domestic league appearances and goals

Donald John Dearson (13 May 1914 – 24 December 1990) was a Welsh footballer who won three caps for his country and played in the Football League for Birmingham (renamed Birmingham Cty in 1943), Coventry City and Walsall.

== Life and career ==
Dearson was born in Ynysybwl, Glamorgan. He began his football career as an inside forward with Barry and moved to First Division Birmingham in 1934. By 1936–37 he had established himself as a first-team player. The following season, he was joint top goalscorer, sharing the honour with Welsh international colleague Wilson Jones. In the last full season played before the Second World War, he moved to half-back. He won three full caps for Wales in their last three pre-war internationals.

A qualified electrical engineer, he was in a reserved occupation during the war, and was available to represent his country in 15 wartime and victory international matches. Chosen to play against England at Birmingham's home ground, St Andrew's, in 1941, Dearson missed a penalty; Wales lost 2–1. He also made 166 appearances for Birmingham in wartime football, including helping the club to the championship of the 1945–46 Football League South.

By the time the Football League proper resumed after the war, Dearson was past his best. He played another half-season for Birmingham as a full back before moving to Second Division Coventry City and then to Walsall of the Third Division South, before finally giving up League football at the age of 37. He still played another couple of years of non-league football with Birmingham Combination side Nuneaton Borough and Bilston.

After retiring from the game he worked for BSA and British Leyland, and died in Sheldon, Birmingham at the age of 76.

== Honours ==
Birmingham City

- Football League South champions 1946

== Sources ==
- Tony, Matthews (1995). Birmingham City: A Complete Record. Birmingham: Breedon Books. ISBN 1-85983-010-2.
- "Welsh Football Data Archive". Archived from the original on 9 January 2014.
- "Don Dearson". Post War English & Scottish Football League A–Z Player's Transfer Database. Neil Brown.
