= Seymour Morris =

Welsh footballer

Personal information
- Full name: Seymour Morris
- Date of birth: 15 February 1913
- Place of birth: Ynyshir, Wales
- Date of death: October 1991 (aged 83)
- Height: 5 ft 6 1/2 in (1.69 m)
- Position: Outside left

Senior career*
Years	Team	Apps	(Gls)
- Aberaman Athletic
1933–1935	Huddersfield Town	6	(3)
1935–1945	Birmingham	83	(29)

International career
1936–1939	Wales	5	(2)
- * Club domestic league appearances and goals

Seymour Morris (15 February 1913 – October 1991) was a Welsh international footballer who played as an outside left. He won five full caps for his country and played for Huddersfield Town and Birmingham in the Football League.

== Biography ==
Morris was born in Ynyshir, Glamorgan. On leaving school he became a miner, and then joined the army, serving in the Welch Regiment. While stationed near Cardiff he played football for Welsh League side Aberaman Athletic, where he was noticed by bigger clubs. He turned professional, signing for Huddersfield Town in 1933. Unable to establish himself as a regular first-team player at Huddersfield, he moved to fellow First Division club Birmingham in March 1935.

At Birmingham he was used in his preferred position on the left wing, but still took another eighteen months to supplant Billy Guest as first choice in that spot. He was the club's top scorer in 1936–37, with 15 league goals (16 in all competitions), but this was the only year in which injury and international duty allowed him to play anything approaching a full season. During the Second World War he serviced aircraft at Elmdon aerodrome and made occasional appearances for Birmingham, playing his last game for the club in April 1945.

He won five full caps for Wales. On his international debut he scored the opening goal in a 2–1 victory over England at Ninian Park on 17 October 1936, which was the first time England had lost in Wales for more than 50 years. Wales went on to win the Home International Championship that season, the last time they won it outright.

When he retired from playing football he returned to Wales and worked in a tool factory in Crickhowell, where he coached the works football team. Later he and his wife ran a children's home. He died in October 1991, aged 78.
