= Jack Sykes =

English footballer (1911–1980)

Personal information
- Full name: John George Sykes
- Date of birth: 5 November 1911
- Place of birth: Wombwell, England
- Date of death: 11 January 1980 (aged 68)
- Height: 5 ft 9 in (1.75 m)
- Position: Left back

Senior career*
Years	Team	Apps	(Gls)
- Wombwell
1932–1937	Birmingham	33	(0)
1937–1939	Millwall	7	(0)
- * Club domestic league appearances and goals

John George Sykes (5 November 1911 – 11 January 1980) was an English footballer who played as a left back. He made 40 appearances in the Football League without scoring, playing for Birmingham and Millwall.

Sykes was born in Wombwell, Yorkshire, and played for Wombwell F.C. before joining Birmingham in 1932. After three years in the reserve team, he started his league career well, but lost form in his second season and moved on to Millwall in 1937. He went on to keep a pub in Birmingham.
