= Frank Clack =

English footballer (1912–1995)

Personal information
- Full name: Frank Edward Clack
- Date of birth: 30 March 1912
- Place of birth: Witney, England
- Date of death: 9 December 1995 (aged 83)
- Place of death: Witney, England
- Height: 5 ft 10 1/4 in (1.78 m)
- Position: Goalkeeper

Youth career
- Witney Town
- 1932–1933: Birmingham

Senior career*
Years	Team	Apps	(Gls)
1933–1939	Birmingham	60	(0)
1939–1947	Brentford	0	(0)
1947–1949	Bristol City	67	(0)
1949–1950	Guildford City		
1950–19??	Dover		
- * Club domestic league appearances and goals

Frank Edward Clack (30 March 1912 – 2 June 1995) was an English professional footballer born in Witney, Oxfordshire, who played as a goalkeeper. He made 127 appearances in the Football League playing for Birmingham and Bristol City.

After several years with Birmingham as understudy to England international Harry Hibbs, Clack joined Brentford before the 1939–40 season, but the outbreak of the Second World War prevented him playing for them. After the war he spent two seasons as first-choice goalkeeper with Bristol City before moving into non-league football.
