= Tom Grosvenor =

English footballer (1908–1972)

Personal information
- Full name: Arthur Thomas Grosvenor
- Date of birth: 22 November 1908
- Place of birth: Netherton, England
- Date of death: 31 October 1972 (aged 63)
- Height: 6 ft 1 1/4 in (1.86 m)
- Position: Inside right

Youth career
- Tippity Green Victoria
- Vono Works

Senior career*
Years	Team	Apps	(Gls)
192?–1928	Stourbridge		
1928–1936	Birmingham	107	(17)
1936–1937	Sheffield Wednesday	22	(1)
1937–193?	Bolton Wanderers	53	(7)
193?–1943	Dudley Town		

International career
1933	England	3	(2)
- * Club domestic league appearances and goals

Arthur Thomas Grosvenor (22 November 1908 – 31 October 1972) was an English professional footballer who played as an inside right. He played more than 100 games for Birmingham (now Birmingham City) in the Football League First Division and won three full caps for England. His brother Percy Grosvenor played for West Bromwich Albion and Leicester City.

Born in the Netherton area of Dudley, Worcestershire, Grosvenor started his football career with Stourbridge before moving to Birmingham in 1928. His early career was disrupted by injury, but once fit he took over at inside right and creator of chances when the ageing Johnny Crosbie moved on. In all he made 115 first team appearances for Birmingham and played three times for England in 1933, scoring twice. After leaving Birmingham he had short spells at Sheffield Wednesday and Bolton Wanderers 1937 to 1938, finishing up at local club Dudley Town in 1938. After football, he became a sheet-metal worker. He died in 1972 at the age of 63.
