= Harold Booton =

English footballer (1906–1976)

Personal information
- Full name: Harold Booton
- Date of birth: 2 March 1906
- Place of birth: Annesley, England
- Date of death: 22 October 1976 (aged 70)
- Place of death: Denham, England
- Height: 5 ft 10 in (1.78 m)
- Position: Right back

Senior career*
Years	Team	Apps	(Gls)
- Annesley Colliery
- Shirebrook
1929–1936	Birmingham	149	(2)
1936–1938	Luton Town	7	(0)
1938–19??	Atherstone Town		
- * Club domestic league appearances and goals

Harold Booton (2 March 1906 – 22 October 1976) was an English professional footballer who made 156 appearances as a right back in the Football League.

Booton was born in Annesley, Nottinghamshire. He began his football career with Annesley Colliery and Shirebrook, and joined Birmingham in 1929. He became a first-team regular for Birmingham after George Liddell retired, and made 162 appearances in all competitions, including 149 in the First Division. He was a solid tackler and kicked powerfully, but his distribution of the ball was wayward. He later played 7 league games for Luton Town, and then moved into non-league football with Atherstone Town. He died in Denham, Buckinghamshire, in 1976 at the age of 70.
