= Isaac Lea (footballer) =

English footballer (1911–1972)

Personal information
- Full name: Isaac George Lea
- Date of birth: 17 February 1911
- Place of birth: Donnington Wood, England
- Date of death: 24 October 1972 (aged 61)
- Place of death: Buckrose, England
- Height: 5 ft 10 in (1.78 m)
- Position: Right half

Senior career*
| Years | Team | Apps | (Gls) |
- Oswestry Town
- Oakengates Town
| 1932–1937 | Birmingham | 27 | (1) |
| 1937–1943 | Millwall | 38 | (0) |
- * Club domestic league appearances and goals

Isaac George Lea (17 February 1911 – 24 October 1972) was an English professional footballer who made 65 appearances in the Football League playing for Birmingham and Millwall. He played as a wing half.

Lea was born in Donnington Wood, Shropshire. He began his football career with Oswestry Town and Oakengates Town before joining Birmingham of the Football League First Division in 1932. He made his debut on 8 October 1932 in a 2–1 win at home to Sheffield Wednesday, but was unable to dislodge England international right-half Lew Stoker from the starting eleven, and made only 28 appearances in all competitions in four and a half years with the club. He joined Millwall at the end of the 1936–37 season, and contributed to their winning the Third Division South title the following season. He made guest appearances for Wrexham and for Wellington Town during the Second World War, and retired from football in 1943. His death was registered in the Buckrose district of the East Riding of Yorkshire in 1972; he was 61.

== Honours ==
Millwall

- Third Division South: 1937-38
