= Fred Harris (footballer, born 1912) =

English footballer (1912–1998)

Personal information
- Full name: Frederick Harris
- Date of birth: 2 July 1912
- Place of birth: Solihull, England
- Date of death: 11 October 1998 (aged 86)
- Place of death: Solihull, England
- Height: 5 ft 9 in (1.75 m)
- Positions: Inside forward; wing half

Youth career
- Birmingham City Transport
- Osborne Athletic

Senior career*
Years	Team	Apps	(Gls)
1933–1950	Birmingham City	280	(61)
- * Club domestic league appearances and goals

Frederick Harris (2 July 1912 – 11 October 1998) was an English footballer who played his whole professional career for Birmingham City.

== Life and career ==
Harris was born in Solihull, Warwickshire. He joined Birmingham as an inside forward in 1933 at the age of 19, and scored on his debut in a 2–1 home win against local rivals Aston Villa at the start of the 1934–35 season. He was the club's leading scorer in 1938–39 with 14 League goals and 17 in all competitions.

During the Second World War he converted to play as a wing half and played out the rest of his career in that position. His strong tackling and constructive use of the ball impressed manager Harry Storer sufficiently to make him club captain. He is credited with recommending Johnny Berry to Birmingham, having seen him play for an Army team while both were serving in India during the war. He won representative honours for the Football League XI against the Scottish League in 1948–49.

Harris retired from football in 1950, aged nearly 38, having made 312 appearances in all competitions for Birmingham and scored 68 goals, and became a chiropodist and physiotherapist in the Acocks Green district of Birmingham. He died in Solihull in October 1998 at the age of 86.

His nephew, Roy McDonough, was also a professional footballer.

== Honours ==
Birmingham City

- Top goalscorer: 1938–39
- Football League South (wartime league): 1945–46
- Second Division: 1947–48
