= Billy Guest =

English footballer (1914–1994)

Personal information
- Full name: William Francis Guest
- Date of birth: 8 February 1914
- Place of birth: Brierley Hill, England
- Date of death: 15 November 1994 (aged 80)
- Place of death: Darwen, England
- Height: 5 ft 9 in (1.75 m)
- Position: Outside left

Youth career
- 1928–1932: Birmingham

Senior career*
Years	Team	Apps	(Gls)
1932–1937	Birmingham	76	(15)
1937–1947	Blackburn Rovers	88	(30)
1947–1948	Walsall	5	(0)
1948–1949	Peterborough United	38	(18)
1949–19??	Kidderminster Harriers		
–	Lovell's Athletic		
–	Hinckley United		
–	Bilston United		
- * Club domestic league appearances and goals

William Francis Guest (8 February 1914 – 15 November 1994) was an English professional footballer who played as an outside left for Birmingham, Blackburn Rovers and Walsall in the Football League either side of the Second World War. During the war, he won a runners-up medal with Blackburn Rovers in the 1940 Football League War Cup Final. He went on to play for Peterborough United in the Midland League, for Kidderminster Harriers and Lovell's Athletic in the Southern League, and for Hinckley United and Bilston United.

During the war he was a guest-player for Lovell's Athletic, the works team for Lovell's sweet factory in Newport, Monmouthshire, Wales.
