= Frank White (footballer) =

English footballer

Personal information
- Full name: Frank Robert Henry White
- Date of birth: 14 April 1911
- Place of birth: Piccadilly, Warwickshire, England
- Date of death: 1985 (aged 73–74)
- Place of death: Tamworth, Staffordshire, England
- Height: 5 ft 8 in (1.73 m)
- Position: Winger

Youth career
- –: Stoneware Ltd
- 1930–1931: Tamworth

Senior career*
Years	Team	Apps	(Gls)
1931–1938	Birmingham	147	(45)
1938–1946	Preston North End	22	(10)
1946–1950	Redditch United		
- * Club domestic league appearances and goals

Frank Robert Henry White (14 April 1911 – 1985) was an English professional footballer who played as a winger. He played nearly 150 First Division games for Birmingham, and also played in the Football League for Preston North End.

White was born in Piccadilly, Warwickshire. He was a prolific goalscorer in junior football before signing for Birmingham on the recommendation of Harry Hibbs. He was pacy with good dribbling and shooting skills, and performed better once moved from the left side, where he had initially been employed as the replacement for Ernie Curtis, to his preferred position of outside-right. His last two seasons at Birmingham were disrupted by injury. Over his career at Birmingham he scored at a rate of a goal every three games.

In December 1938 he moved to Preston North End; he scored ten league goals in the half-season remaining but then the Second World War put paid to his professional career. He made guest appearances for several clubs during the war and afterwards played for Redditch United. He later coached his former club Tamworth. He died in 1985 aged 74.
