= Wilson Jones (footballer, born 1914) =

Welsh footballer (1914–1986)

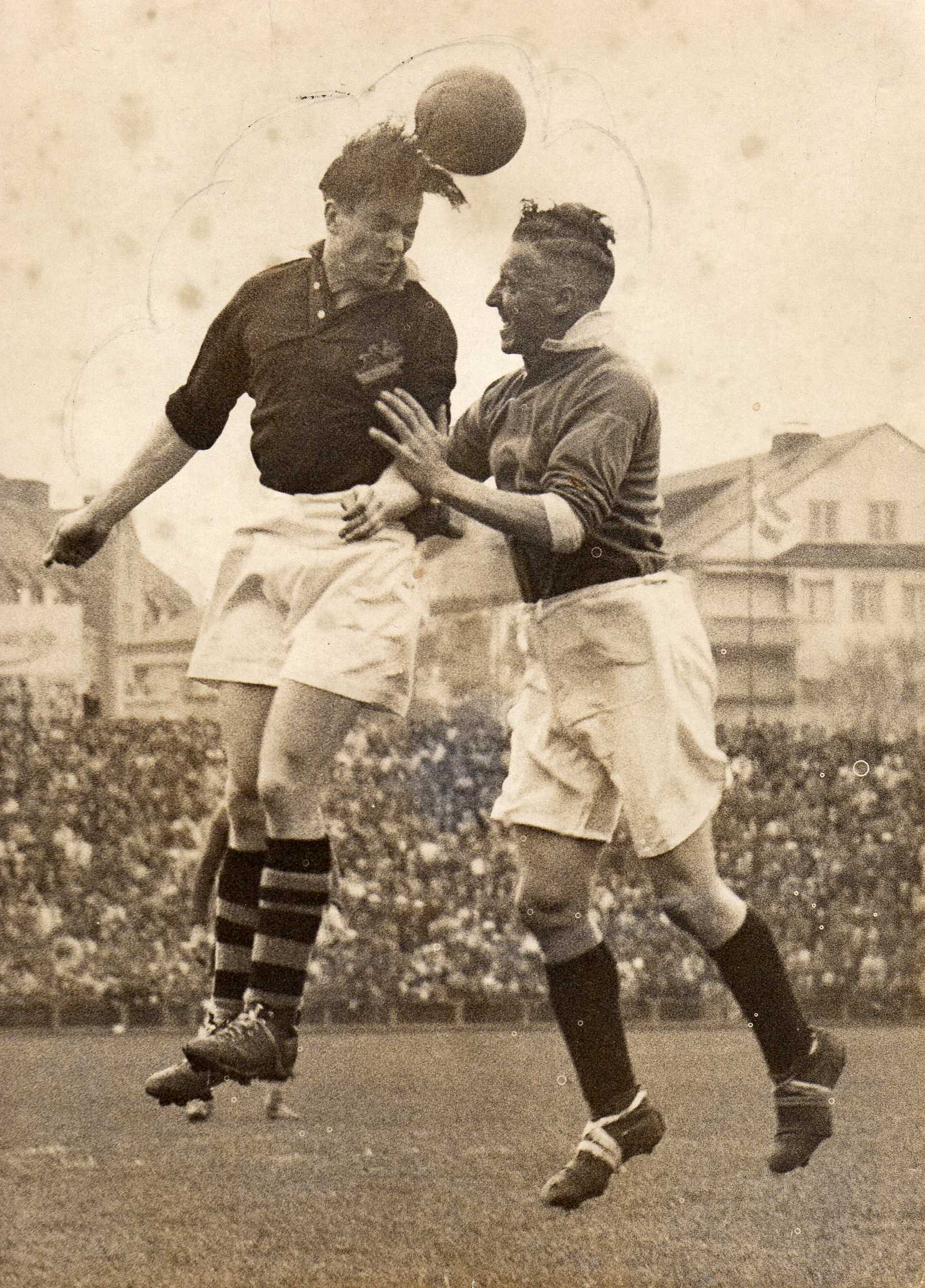
- Jones (r.) in a game against Swedish club AIK Fotboll in 1946

Personal information
- Full name: Charles Wilson Jones
- Date of birth: 29 April 1914
- Place of birth: Pentre Broughton, Wales
- Date of death: 9 January 1986 (aged 71)
- Place of death: Birmingham, England
- Height: 5 ft 8 3/4 in (1.75 m)
- Position: Centre forward

Youth career
- 1930–1932: Brymbo Green

Senior career*
Years	Team	Apps	(Gls)
1932–1934	Wrexham	6	(3)
1934–1947	Birmingham	135	(63)
1947–1948	Nottingham Forest	7	(5)
1948–1949	Kidderminster Harriers		

International career
1935–1939	Wales	2	(1)
- * Club domestic league appearances and goals

Charles Wilson Jones (29 April 1914 – 9 January 1986) was a Welsh international footballer who played as a centre forward for Wrexham, Birmingham (renamed Birmingham City in 1943) and Nottingham Forest in the Football League.

He was Birmingham's top scorer on three occasions in the First Division in the 1930s. He won two caps for Wales, the first on 27 March 1935 against Northern Ireland at the Racecourse Ground, Wrexham, when he scored the first goal in a 3–1 win, and the second on 20 May 1939, a 2–1 defeat against France in Paris.

He was landlord of the White Hart public house in Aston, Birmingham, for 19 years until it was demolished in 1968 prior to the construction of the Aston Expressway.
