= George Morrall =

English footballer

Personal information
- Full name: George Richard Morrall
- Date of birth: 4 October 1905
- Place of birth: Smethwick, England
- Date of death: 15 November 1955 (aged 50)
- Place of death: Birmingham, England
- Height: 5 ft 11 3/4 in (1.82 m)
- Position: Centre half

Senior career*
Years	Team	Apps	(Gls)
- Gorse Street Primitive Methodists
- Chance's Glass Works
- Littleton Harriers
- Allen Everitt's Sports
- West Bromwich Albion (trial)
1927–1936	Birmingham	243	(5)
1936–1940	Swindon Town	97	(5)
- * Club domestic league appearances and goals

George Richard Morrall (4 October 1905 – 15 November 1955) was an English professional footballer who played as a centre half. Born in Smethwick, Staffordshire, Morrall made 266 senior appearances for Birmingham, which included 243 top-flight League matches and the 1931 FA Cup Final at Wembley. He was a dominant defender, good both in the air and on the ground, and a fierce tackler. He went on to make more than 100 appearances for Third Division South club Swindon Town. Morrall died in Birmingham aged 50.

== Honours ==
Birmingham

- FA Cup runner-up: 1930–31
