= Lewis Stoker =

English footballer (1910–1979)

Personal information
- Full name: Lewis Stoker
- Date of birth: 31 March 1910
- Place of birth: Wheatley Hill, England
- Date of death: 26 May 1979 (aged 69)
- Place of death: Birmingham, England
- Height: 5 ft 10 in (1.78 m)
- Position: Right half

Youth career
- Brandon Juniors
- Esh Winning Juniors

Senior career*
Years	Team	Apps	(Gls)
- Bearpark
- West Stanley
1930–1938	Birmingham	230	(2)
1938–1939	Nottingham Forest	11	(0)

International career
1932–1934	England	3	(0)
- * Club domestic league appearances and goals

Lewis Stoker (31 March 1910 – 26 May 1979) was an English professional footballer who played as an attacking right half. Born in Wheatley Hill, County Durham, he spent most of his professional career at Birmingham, for whom he played 246 games in all competitions, including 230 in the First Division. He moved on to Nottingham Forest in 1938, made 11 Second Division appearances, and retired during the Second World War. He won three full caps for England between 1932 and 1934, and played once for the Football League representative team. After retiring from football Lewis lived in Sparkhill Birmingham. He worked firstly at the BSA factory and then for the Wimbush bakery both in Small Heath[Birmingham] near the St Andrews Football ground where he played most of his football. Lewis died in the city at the age of 69.

His brother Bob also played league football.
