= Tom Fillingham =

English footballer

Personal information
- Full name: Thomas Fillingham
- Date of birth: 6 September 1904
- Place of birth: Bulwell, England
- Date of death: 1 May 1960 (aged 55)
- Place of death: Bulwell, England
- Height: 5 ft 11 1/2 in (1.82 m)
- Position: Centre half

Senior career*
Years	Team	Apps	(Gls)
- Bulwell Wesleyan Mission
- Butlers Hill Primitives
- Daybrook Baptists
- Hucknall Colliery
- Bromley United
1928–1938	Birmingham	183	(8)
1938–1945	Ipswich Town	29	(1)
- * Club domestic league appearances and goals

Thomas Fillingham (6 September 1904 – 1 May 1960) was an English professional footballer who played as a centre half. He made 212 appearances in the Football League in the late 1920s and 1930s.

Born in Bulwell, Nottinghamshire, Fillingham worked at a colliery and a dyehouse and played local football in the Nottinghamshire area before turning professional with Birmingham, for whom he went on to play 183 games in the Football League First Division. He was a strong, versatile player; originally a forward, he converted to defence, becoming first choice at centre half as the replacement for George Morrall, while remaining keen to push forward. He sustained an injury playing for Birmingham in 1934 which resulted in him losing an eye some 15 years later.

In 1938 Fillingham moved to Ipswich Town, and played in their first ever match in the Football League. He made guest appearances for clubs in the Nottinghamshire area during the Second World War, but did not play afterwards. He was also a good cricketer and golfer. He died in Bulwell in 1960 at the age of 55.

== Honours ==
Birmingham

- FA Cup finalist: 1930–31
