= Harry Hibbs (footballer) =

English footballer (1906–1984)

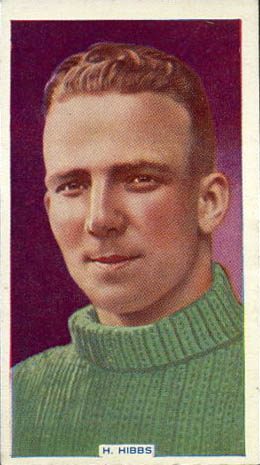
- Hibbs in 1936

Personal information
- Full name: Henry Edward Hibbs
- Date of birth: 27 May 1906
- Place of birth: Wilnecote, England
- Date of death: 23 April 1984 (aged 77)
- Place of death: Welwyn Garden City, England
- Height: 5 ft 9 3/4 in (1.77 m)
- Position: Goalkeeper

Youth career
- Wilnecote Holy Trinity

Senior career*
| Years | Team | Apps | (Gls) |
- Tamworth Castle
| 1924–1939 | Birmingham | 358 | (0) |
| 1953–1954 | de Havillands | | |

International career
| 1929–1936 | England | 25 | (0) |

Managerial career
- 1944–1951: Walsall
- 1961–1962: Ware Town
- 1962–1963: Welwyn Garden City
- * Club domestic league appearances and goals

Henry Edward Hibbs (27 May 1906 – 23 April 1984) was an English footballer who played as a goalkeeper for Birmingham and England in the 1920s and 1930s. His uncle Hubert Pearson and cousin Harold Pearson were also professional players.

== Playing career ==
Hibbs was born in the township of Wilnecote, Warwickshire and, whilst training as a plumber, played for his local club sides Wilnecote Holy Trinity and Tamworth Castle, who had some torrid seasons in the Birmingham and District Football League (the club conceding a total 164 goals over the 1922 and 1923 seasons). Despite this, Hibbs came to the attention of Birmingham when he was 17 years of age, and impressed so much in trials that he was offered professional forms in May 1924. Among such club legends as Frank Womack and Joe Bradford, Hibbs became a regular feature of Billy Beer's side, but it was a barren period in the club's history.

Leslie Knighton's arrival from Bournemouth & Boscombe Athletic in 1928 signalled an improvement in fortunes for both Hibbs and Birmingham. Hibbs was part of an FA tour to South Africa and made three appearances for the Football League XI. His form on the FA tour earned him a call up for England, and he was selected to play Wales at Stamford Bridge on 20 November 1929. England won the match 6–0, with a hat-trick from George Camsell He was selected for the "Professionals" in the 1929 FA Charity Shield, but missed the game due to an injury.

Prior to Hibbs's debut, the England selectors had tried 21 different goalkeepers in the nine years since Sam Hardy's retirement in 1920. Hibbs was almost a "carbon copy" of Hardy, unspectacular but highly reliable, preferring to do everything in as simple a manner as possible, a style that was to see him become England's most capped goalkeeper up to that time, as he was selected 25 times for England (ten clean sheets), becoming a main-stay well into the mid-1930s.

Birmingham reached the FA Cup final in 1931, in which they lost 2–1 to a strong West Bromwich Albion side. Hibbs' cousin, Harold Pearson, who played on the winning side in the Cup Final, was selected to play for England against Scotland on 9 April 1932 in what would be his only full international appearance.

After 389 games, his career with Birmingham came to an end a little while into the start of the Second World War. His testimonial came against cross-city rivals Aston Villa on 13 April 1940, in the first Wartime benefit game.

== Managerial career ==
In August 1944, Hibbs became manager of Walsall for seven years. The highlight of this period was the club's appearance in the 1946 Third Division (South) final, in front of 20,000, at Stamford Bridge against Bournemouth and by the team of Ron Crutchley, Doug Lishman, Reg Foulkes, "Nutty" Newman and goalkeeper Jackie Lewis.

Hibbs went back to play in goal for Havillands F.C. between February 1953 and the following summer. He then left football altogether before coming back to carry out two managerial stints at Ware for the 1960–61 season and Welwyn Garden City for the 1962–63 season.

== After football ==
Hibbs settled in Welwyn Garden City, where he died in April 1984 at the age of 77.

== Honours ==
Birmingham

- FA Cup runner-up: 1930–31
