= Parr (surname) =

Parr is a surname. Notable people with the surname include:

- Adam Parr (born 1965), British investment banker
- Adrian Parr (fl. 2024), Australian-born philosopher and cultural critic
- Albert Eide Parr (1900–1991) Norwegian-born, American marine biologist, zoologist and oceanographer
- Allan Parr (1879–1954), Canadian hockey player
- Anne Parr (disambiguation), various people
- Archie Parr (1860–1942), American rancher and politician
- Bartholomew Parr (1750–1810), British physician
- Ben Parr (born 1985), American journalist, author, venture capitalist and entrepreneur
- Bob Parr (born 1957), New Zealand television personality, former UK Special Forces operator
- Butler Parr (1810–1872), English cricketer
- Carolyn Miller Parr (born 1937), judge of the United States Tax Court
- Catherine Parr (1512–1548), Queen of England (1543–1547)
- Cecil Parr (1847–1928), British tennis player
- Charles Henry Parr (1868–1941), American mechanical engineer
- Charlie Parr (born 1967), American country blues musician
- Chris Parr (1943–2023), British theatre director and television executive
- Cory Parr (born 1987), American tennis player
- Delia Parr, pen name of Mary Lechleidner, American author
- Edmund Parr (1849–1925), American politician
- Eleeshushe Parr (1896–1975), Inuk artist
- Elizabeth Parr (disambiguation), various people
- Frank Parr (1918–2003), English chess player
- Frank Parr (musician) (1928–2012), English cricketer
- Gary Parr, American investment banker
- George Parr (cricketer) (1826–1891), English cricketer
- George Berham Parr (1901–1975), American rancher and politician
- Gordon Parr (born 1938), English footballer
- Harriet Parr (1828–1900), British author
- Harry Parr (footballer, born 1914) (1914–after 1939), English footballer
- Harry Parr (footballer, born 1915) (1915–2004), English footballer
- Henry Parr (disambiguation), various people
- Hugo Parr (born 1947), Norwegian physicist, civil servant and politician
- Jack Parr (1936–2015), American basketball player
- Jackie Parr (1920–1985), English footballer
- James Parr (disambiguation), various people
- Jerry Parr (1930–2015), Secret Service agent for Ronald Reagan
- Jill Parr, American musician
- Jim Parr (1927–2000), English-Canadian academic, broadcaster and civil servant
- Jocelyn Parr (born 1967), New Zealand footballer
- Jocelyn Parr (writer), Canadian writer
- John Parr (disambiguation), various people
- John Wayne Parr (born 1976), Australian kickboxer
- Jonathan Parr (born 1988), Norwegian footballer
- Joseph Parr (1790–1868), town crier of Derby
- Joy Parr (born 1949), Canadian historian
- Judy Margaret Parr, New Zealand educational psychologist
- Katherine Parr (actress), English actress
- Ken Parr, English rugby league footballer
- Ken Parr (sport shooter) (born 1962), British sport shooter
- Kenneth Parr (born 1988), British sport shooter
- Larry Parr (chess player) (1946–2011), American chess player, author and editor
- Larry Parr (director), New Zealand film director and screenwriter
- Lenton Parr (1924–2003), Australian sculptor and art teacher
- Leslie Parr (1897–1956), Australian politician
- Lily Parr (1905–1978), English footballer
- Louisa Parr (c. 1848–1903), British writer
- Lulu Bell Parr (1876–1960), American Wild West performer
- Maria Parr (born 1981), Norwegian children's writer
- Martin Parr (1952–2025), British documentary photographer, photojournalist and photobook collector
- Martin Willoughby Parr (1892–1985), governor of the British-administered province of Equatoria in Anglo-Egyptian Sudan
- Martin Parr (actor) (born 1970), British stage actor and theatre director
- Mary Parr (born 1961), Irish hurdler
- Matthew Parr (disambiguation), various people
- Maud Green, Lady Parr (1492–1531), mother-in-law of Henry VIII
- Michael Parr (born 1986), British actor
- Mike Parr (born 1945), Australian performance artist and printmaker
- Nowell Parr (1864–1933), British architect
- Percival Parr (1859–1912), English footballer
- Rajat Parr, Indian-American sommelier and winemaker
- Ralph Parr (1924–2012), American flying ace
- Richard Parr (c. 1592–1644), English bishop
- Robert Parr (1921–2017), American chemist
- Robert Parr, pseudonym of Erle Stanley Gardner (1889–1970)
- Rose Marie Parr, Chief Pharmaceutical Officer for Scotland
- Russ Parr (born 1959), American radio and television personality
- Samuel Parr (1747 – 1825), English schoolmaster and writer
- Samuel Parr (cricketer) (1820–1873), English cricketer
- Samuel Wilson Parr (1857–1931), American chemist
- Simon Parr, British Chief Constable
- Steve Parr (broadcaster) (born 1955), New Zealand television and radio personality
- Steve Parr (footballer) (1926–2019), English footballer
- Susanna Parr (fl. 1650–1659), British religious writer
- Sydney Parr, American softball player
- Terence Parr (born 1964), American computer scientist
- Thelma Parr (1906–2000), American actress
- Thomas Parr (disambiguation), various people
- Todd Parr (born 1962), American children's writer
- Old Tom Parr (reputedly 1483–1635), English supercentenarian who claimed to have lived for 152 years
- Tony Parr (born 1955), Royal New Zealand Navy admiral
- William Parr (disambiguation), various people

== Fictional characters ==
- The Parr family, from The Incredibles
  - Robert "Bob" Parr –
  - Helen Parr – Elastigirl or Mrs. Incredible
  - Violet Parr
  - Dashiell "Dash" Robert Parr
  - John Jackson "Jack-Jack" Parr
