= 1939–40 Birmingham F.C. season =

Birmingham F.C.
1939–40 season
- Chairman: Harry Morris Jr
- Ground: St Andrew's
- Football League Second Division: 2nd (abandoned)
- Midland Regional League: 4th
- Football League War Cup: Quarter final (eliminated by West Ham United)
- Top goalscorer: League: Wilson Jones (10); All: Harold Bodle (12)
Home colours

During the 1939–40 season, Birmingham Football Club played three Second Division matches before the Football League season was abandoned because of the Second World War. The team had been relegated in 1938–39 after 18 consecutive seasons in the top tier. Regionally based competitions were organised so that football could continue while unnecessary travel was minimised. Birmingham played in the Midland Regional League, finishing fourth of eight teams, and in the Football League War Cup, in which they lost to eventual winners West Ham United in the quarter-final.

== Background ==
After 18 consecutive seasons in the First Division, Birmingham were relegated at the end of the 1938–39 Football League campaign. Manager George Liddell resigned, and returned to his former career as a schoolteacher. First-team coach Jack Bestall also left the club. No successors were appointed. Trainer Billy Gibson's duties were extended to include coaching, and Jack Foster, formerly chief scout at Portsmouth, was appointed to the corresponding role at Birmingham. The directors stated that they were "prepared to accept Mr Foster's advice in all matters relating to players", but confirmed that they would act promptly if it became necessary to appoint a manager.

During the previous season, 1500 new tip-up seats had been installed and the terracing in front of the grandstand completely renovated. Over the close season, the pitch was replanted and reseeded.

Player departures included goalkeeper Frank Clack and half-backs Wally Halsall, Bob Meacock and Dai Richards.

== Football League Second Division ==
Birmingham began the 1939–40 Football League season in the Second Division, but the onset of the Second World War caused the League to be abandoned after three rounds of Second Division matches had been played. They fielded the same eleven for all three matches: Harry Hibbs, Cyril Trigg, Billy Hughes, James Bye, Arthur Turner, Ray Shaw, Jackie Brown, Don Dearson, Ted Duckhouse, Fred Harris and Tom Farrage. Farrage was killed in action in September 1944, serving as a private in the 10th Battalion, the Parachute Regiment during Operation Market Garden. With two wins and a draw, they stood second in the table, behind Luton Town on goal average.

Match results
| Date | Opponents | Venue | Result | Score F–A | Scorers | Attendance |
|---|---|---|---|---|---|---|
| 26 August 1939 | Tottenham Hotspur | A | D | 1–1 | Brown | 28,366 |
| 30 August 1939 | Leicester City | H | W | 2–0 | Farrage, Sharman og | 13,848 |
| 2 September 1939 | Burnley | H | W | 2–0 | Dearson, Duckhouse | 15,900 |

=== League table (part) ===
Final Second Division table (part)
| Pos | Club | Pld | W | D | L | F | A | GA | Pts |
|---|---|---|---|---|---|---|---|---|---|
| 1st | Luton Town | 3 | 2 | 1 | 0 | 7 | 1 | 7.00 | 5 |
| 2nd | Birmingham | 3 | 2 | 1 | 0 | 5 | 1 | 5.00 | 5 |
| 3rd | Leicester City | 3 | 2 | 0 | 1 | 5 | 2 | 2.50 | 4 |
| 4th | Coventry City | 3 | 1 | 2 | 0 | 8 | 6 | 1.33 | 4 |
| 5th | Plymouth Argyle | 3 | 2 | 0 | 1 | 4 | 3 | 1.33 | 4 |
| Key | Pos = League position; Pld = Matches played; W = Matches won; D = Matches drawn; L = Matches lost; F = Goals for; A = Goals against; GA = Goal average; Pts = Points | | | | | | | | |
| Source | | | | | | | | | |

== Midland Regional League ==
When war was declared in September 1939, the government banned public gatherings until safety implications could be assessed. Most football grounds reopened soon afterwards, even those in built-up or strategically significant areas, but Birmingham's Chief Constable ordered the continued closure of St Andrew's because of its proximity to likely air-raid targets such as the BSA munitions factories. Consequently, Birmingham were forced to play all their away fixtures first, and when this became impossible, to play home fixtures on a neutral ground – the Windmill Ground at Leamington hosted two "home" matches. The matter was first raised in Parliament in November 1939, but the Home Secretary was unwilling to intervene in what he perceived as a local issue outside his jurisdiction. By March 1940, when St Andrew's had for some time been the only football ground in England still closed, the Chief Constable bowed to public pressure, and a crowd of 13,241 witnessed Birmingham's first home game in more than six months, against Walsall in the Midland Regional League.

Match results
| Date | Opponents | Venue | Result | Score F–A | Scorers |
|---|---|---|---|---|---|
| 21 October 1939 | Wolverhampton Wanderers | A | W | 3–2 | Broome, Edwards, Dearson |
| 28 October 1939 | Walsall | A | W | 2–1 | Dennis Jennings, Dearson |
| 4 November 1939 | Luton Town | A | W | 2–1 | Duckhouse, Dearson |
| 11 November 1939 | Coventry City | A | L | 1–3 | Brown |
| 18 November 1939 | West Bromwich Albion | A | D | 2–2 | Brown 2 |
| 25 November 1939 | Leicester City | A | W | 3–1 | Jones, Bye, Edwards |
| 2 December 1939 | Northampton Town | A | D | 1–1 | Jones |
| 9 December 1939 | Wolverhampton Wanderers | A | L | 2–6 | Broome 2 |
| 16 December 1939 | Walsall | A | W | 2–1 | Edwards, Broome |
| 27 December 1939 | West Bromwich Albion | A | L | 0–3 | |
| 30 December 1939 | Coventry City | H (Note: Match played at Windmill Ground, Leamington) | L | 2–4 | Broome, Bodle |
| 13 January 1940 | Leicester City | H | D | 3–3 | Guest 2, Duckhouse |
| 20 January 1940 | Northampton Town | A | L | 0–3 | |
| 10 February 1940 | Luton Town | A | L | 2–4 | Harris, Roberts o.g. |
| 24 February 1940 | West Bromwich Albion | A | L | 1–6 | Edwards |
| 2 March 1940 | Leicester City | A | L | 1–2 | Jones |
| 9 March 1940 | Northampton Town | A | W | 3–1 | Turner pen., Brown, Bodle |
| 16 March 1940 | Wolverhampton Wanderers | A | L | 1–3 | Bodle |
| 23 March 1940 | Walsall | H | W | 2–1 | Jones 2 |
| 25 March 1940 | West Bromwich Albion | A | L | 1–4 | Duckhouse |
| 26 March 1940 | Luton Town | H | W | 5–4 | Bodle 2, Jones 2, A.E. Godden |
| 30 March 1940 | Luton Town | H | W | 4–1 | Jones, Trigg 2, Bodle |
| 6 April 1940 | Coventry City | H | W | 2–1 | Trigg 2 |
| 10 April 1940 | Wolverhampton Wanderers | H | L | 0–1 | |
| 1 May 1940 | Northampton Town | H | W | 3–1 | Gardner, Bodle, Trigg |
| 20 May 1940 | Leicester City | H | D | 0–0 | |
| 5 June 1940 | Coventry City | H | D | 0–0 | |
| 8 June 1940 | Walsall | H | W | 8–1 | Bodle 2, Duckworth 2, Jones 2, Brown, Godfrey o.g. |

=== League table ===
Final Midland Regional League table
| Pos | Club | Pld | W | D | L | F | A | GA | Pts |
|---|---|---|---|---|---|---|---|---|---|
| 1st | Wolverhampton Wanderers | 28 | 19 | 3 | 6 | 76 | 44 | 1.73 | 41 |
| 2nd | West Bromwich Albion | 28 | 18 | 4 | 6 | 87 | 51 | 1.71 | 40 |
| 3rd | Coventry City | 28 | 13 | 3 | 12 | 68 | 57 | 1.19 | 29 |
| 4th | Birmingham | 28 | 12 | 5 | 11 | 56 | 60 | 0.93 | 29 |
| 5th | Luton Town | 28 | 10 | 4 | 14 | 76 | 88 | 0.86 | 24 |
| 6th | Northampton Town | 28 | 7 | 8 | 13 | 48 | 59 | 0.81 | 22 |
| 7th | Leicester City | 28 | 7 | 6 | 15 | 51 | 71 | 0.72 | 20 |
| 8th | Walsall | 28 | 7 | 5 | 16 | 51 | 83 | 0.61 | 19 |
| Key | Pos = League position; Pld = Matches played; W = Matches won; D = Matches drawn; L = Matches lost; F = Goals for; A = Goals against; GA = Goal average; Pts = Points | | | | | | | | |
| Source | | | | | | | | | |

== Football League War Cup ==
Match results
| Round | Date | Opponents | Venue | Result | Score F–A | Scorers |
|---|---|---|---|---|---|---|
| First round first leg | 20 April 1940 | Newport County | A | D | 2–2 | Godden 2 |
| First round second leg | 27 April 1940 | Newport County | H | W | 5–2 | Trigg 2, Bodle 2, Godden |
| Second round first leg | 4 May 1940 | Reading | H | W | 2–0 | Trigg, Jones |
| Second round second leg | 11 May 1940 | Reading | A | W | 2–0 | Godden, Bodle |
| Third round | 18 May 1940 | Arsenal | A (Note: Played at White Hart Lane) | W | 2–1 | Godden, Turner |
| Quarter final | 25 May 1940 | West Ham United | A | L | 2–4 | Trigg 2 |

== Appearances and goals ==
For a description of the playing formation, see formation (association football)#2–3–5 (Pyramid).

Players marked with an asterisk * were guests, not registered Birmingham players.

Players having played at least one first-team match
| Pos. | Nat. | Name | Football League | | Midland Regional League | | Football League War Cup | | Total | |
| Pos. | Nat. | Name | Apps | Goals | Apps | Goals | Apps | Goals | Apps | Goals |
|---|---|---|---|---|---|---|---|---|---|---|
| GK | ENG | Harry Hibbs | 3 | 0 | 9 | 0 | 0 | 0 | 12 | 0 |
| GK | ENG | Gil Merrick | 0 | 0 | 1 | 0 | 0 | 0 | 1 | 0 |
| GK | ENG | Jack Wheeler | 0 | 0 | 18 | 0 | 6 | 0 | 24 | 0 |
| FB | ENG | Sam Bellamy | 0 | 0 | 4 | 0 | 0 | 0 | 4 | 0 |
| FB | SCO | George Cummings * | — | | 4 | 0 | 0 | 0 | 4 | 0 |
| FB | WAL | Billy Hughes | 3 | 0 | 17 | 0 | 6 | 0 | 26 | 0 |
| FB | ENG | Dennis Jennings | 0 | 0 | 8 | 1 | 0 | 0 | 8 | 1 |
| FB | ENG | Wally Quinton | 0 | 0 | 18 | 0 | 6 | 0 | 24 | 0 |
| FB | ENG | Cyril Trigg | 3 | 0 | 16 | 5 | 6 | 6 | 25 | 0 |
| HB | ENG | Jimmy Allen * | — | | 1 | 0 | 0 | 0 | 1 | 0 |
| HB | ENG | James Bye | 3 | 0 | 19 | 1 | 4 | 0 | 26 | 1 |
| HB | ENG | Fred Deakin | 0 | 0 | 3 | 0 | 0 | 0 | 3 | 0 |
| HB | ENG | Ray Devey | 0 | 0 | 3 | 0 | 0 | 0 | 3 | 0 |
| HB | ENG | Reg Foulkes | 0 | 0 | 7 | 0 | 0 | 0 | 7 | 0 |
| HB | ENG | Bob Iverson * | — | | 7 | 0 | 0 | 0 | 7 | 0 |
| HB | SCO | Alex Massie * | — | | 4 | 0 | 0 | 0 | 4 | 0 |
| HB | ENG | F.W. Moss | 0 | 0 | 1 | 0 | 0 | 0 | 1 | 0 |
| HB | ENG | Ray Shaw | 3 | 0 | 10 | 0 | 0 | 0 | 13 | 0 |
| HB | ENG | Arthur Turner | 3 | 0 | 17 | 1 | 6 | 1 | 26 | 2 |
| FW | ENG | J. Bate * | — | | 1 | 0 | 0 | 0 | 1 | 0 |
| FW | ENG | Harold Bodle | 0 | 0 | 17 | 9 | 6 | 3 | 23 | 12 |
| FW | ENG | Frank Broome * | — | | 7 | 5 | 0 | 0 | 7 | 5 |
| FW | ENG | E. Brown | 0 | 0 | 1 | 0 | 0 | 0 | 1 | 0 |
| FW | IRE | Jackie Brown | 3 | 1 | 15 | 5 | 5 | 0 | 23 | 6 |
| FW | ENG | Charlie Craven | 0 | 0 | 9 | 0 | 0 | 0 | 9 | 0 |
| FW | WAL | Don Dearson | 3 | 1 | 19 | 3 | 5 | 0 | 27 | 4 |
| FW | ENG | Ted Duckhouse | 3 | 1 | 6 | 5 | 0 | 0 | 9 | 6 |
| FW | ENG | George Edwards * | — | | 10 | 4 | 0 | 0 | 10 | 4 |
| FW | ENG | Tom Farrage | 3 | 1 | 0 | 0 | 0 | 0 | 3 | 1 |
| FW | ENG | Fred Gardner | 0 | 0 | 2 | 1 | 0 | 0 | 2 | 1 |
| FW | ENG | A.E. Godden | 0 | 0 | 5 | 1 | 6 | 4 | 11 | 5 |
| FW | ENG | Billy Guest * | — | | 6 | 2 | 0 | 0 | 6 | 2 |
| FW | ENG | Fred Harris | 3 | 0 | 19 | 1 | 6 | 0 | 28 | 1 |
| FW | WAL | Wilson Jones | 0 | 0 | 17 | 10 | 3 | 1 | 17 | 11 |
| FW | ENG | Dudley Kernick * | — | | 1 | 0 | 0 | 0 | 1 | 0 |
| FW | ENG | Jackie Martin * | — | | 2 | 0 | 0 | 0 | 2 | 0 |
| FW | WAL | Seymour Morris | 0 | 0 | 1 | 0 | 0 | 0 | 1 | 0 |
| FW | ENG | Frank Moss * | — | | 2 | 0 | 0 | 0 | 2 | 0 |
| FW | ENG | D.W. Rowley | 0 | 0 | 1 | 0 | 0 | 0 | 1 | 0 |
