= 1938–39 Birmingham F.C. season =

Birmingham F.C.
1938–39 season
- Chairman: Harry Morris Jr
- Manager: George Liddell
- Ground: St Andrew's
- Football League First Division: 21st (relegated)
- FA Cup: Fifth round (eliminated by Everton)
- Top goalscorer: League: Fred Harris (14); All: Fred Harris (17)
- Highest home attendance: 67,341 (Note: The records page of Birmingham City F.C.'s website and the 2010 Sky Sports Football Yearbook list the attendance at 66,844. Others, including the history page of Birmingham City F.C.'s website, Matthews' Encyclopedia and Complete Record, and The Times newspaper from the Monday following the match, say 67,341.) vs Everton, FA Cup 5th round, 11 February 1939
- Lowest home attendance: 8,970 vs Huddersfield Town, 29 March 1939
- Average home league attendance: 25,228
Home colours

The 1938–39 Football League season was Birmingham Football Club's 43rd in the Football League and their 26th in the First Division. They were in the relegation positions after the second game of the season, rarely rose above them, and finished in 21st place in the 22-team division, one point from safety, so dropped to the Second Division for the 1939–40 season. They entered the 1938–39 FA Cup at the third round proper and lost to Everton in the fifth round after a replay. The club's record attendance was set in the FA Cup-tie at home to Everton, variously recorded as 67,341 or 66,844.

Thirty-two players made at least one appearance in nationally organised first-team competition, and there were fifteen different goalscorers. Half-back Don Dearson played in 42 of the 46 matches over the season, and Fred Harris was the leading scorer with 17 goals, of which 14 were scored in the league. Harry Morris, son of the Harry Morris who played for the club in the 1880s and was a member of the board of directors for nearly 30 years, took over as chairman from Howard Cant.

When the Second World War began, the 1939–40 Football League season was abandoned after three Second Division matches had been played. The first post-war Football League season was in 1946–47, though the FA Cup resumed a season earlier.

== Football League First Division ==
| Date | League position | Opponents | Venue | Result | Score F–A | Scorers | Attendance |
|---|---|---|---|---|---|---|---|
| 27 August 1938 | 14th | Sunderland | H | L | 1–2 | Jennings pen | 32,117 |
| 31 August 1938 | 20th | Leeds United | A | L | 0–2 | | 13,578 |
| 3 September 1938 | 22nd | Manchester United | A | L | 1–4 | Harris | 22,228 |
| 7 September 1938 | 20th | Leicester City | H | W | 2–1 | Kelly, Jones | 14,092 |
| 10 September 1938 | 21st | Stoke City | H | L | 1–2 | Harris | 26,519 |
| 12 September 1938 | 21st | Leicester City | A | L | 1–2 | Farrage | 10,778 |
| 17 September 1938 | 21st | Chelsea | A | D | 2–2 | Brown pen, Jones | 39,505 |
| 24 September 1938 | 22nd | Preston North End | H | L | 1–3 | Farrage | 26,221 |
| 1 October 1938 | 22nd | Charlton Athletic | A | D | 4–4 | Harris 2, Duckhouse, White | 20,039 |
| 8 October 1938 | 22nd | Bolton Wanderers | H | L | 0–2 | | 21,855 |
| 15 October 1938 | 20th | Derby County | H | W | 3–0 | White 2, Brown | 27,858 |
| 22 October 1938 | 22nd | Grimsby Town | A | L | 0–1 | | 11,022 |
| 29 October 1938 | 21st | Aston Villa | H | W | 3–0 | Harris 2, Brown | 55,301 |
| 5 November 1938 | 22nd | Wolverhampton Wanderers | A | L | 1–2 | Phillips | 30,713 |
| 12 November 1938 | 21st | Everton | H | W | 1–0 | Phillips | 27,548 |
| 19 November 1938 | 21st | Huddersfield Town | A | L | 1–3 | Morris | 14,637 |
| 26 November 1938 | 20th | Portsmouth | H | W | 2–0 | Jennings pen, Dearson | 20,317 |
| 3 December 1938 | 21st | Arsenal | A | L | 1–3 | Jennings pen | 33,710 |
| 10 December 1938 | 19th | Brentford | H | W | 5–1 | White 4, Phillips | 23,333 |
| 17 December 1938 | 21st | Blackpool | A | L | 1–2 | White | 11,855 |
| 24 December 1938 | 22nd | Sunderland | A | L | 0–1 | | 14,555 |
| 26 December 1938 | 21st | Middlesbrough | H | W | 2–1 | Morris, Trigg | 17,953 |
| 27 December 1938 | 21st | Middlesbrough | A | D | 2–2 | Harris, Phillips | 33,534 |
| 31 December 1938 | 22nd | Manchester United | H | D | 3–3 | Jennings, Phillips, Dearson | 20,787 |
| 14 January 1939 | 22nd | Stoke City | A | L | 3–6 | Jennings pen, Harris, Duckhouse | 14,417 |
| 28 January 1939 | 22nd | Preston North End | A | L | 0–5 | | 18,477 |
| 4 February 1939 | 22nd | Charlton Athletic | H | L | 3–4 | Harris 3 | 29,727 |
| 18 February 1939 | 22nd | Derby County | A | W | 1–0 | Brown | 15,411 |
| 22 February 1939 | 22nd | Bolton Wanderers | A | L | 0–3 | | 11,696 |
| 25 February 1939 | 22nd | Grimsby Town | H | D | 1–1 | Craven | 23,231 |
| 4 March 1939 | 22nd | Aston Villa | A | L | 1–5 | Dearson | 40,874 |
| 11 March 1939 | 22nd | Wolverhampton Wanderers | H | W | 3–2 | Harris, Morris, Jones | 48,970 |
| 18 March 1939 | 22nd | Everton | A | L | 2–4 | Harris, Jones | 29,867 |
| 29 March 1939 | 22nd | Huddersfield Town | H | D | 1–1 | Jones | 8,970 |
| 1 April 1939 | 22nd | Portsmouth | A | L | 0–2 | | 21,918 |
| 7 April 1939 | 22nd | Liverpool | A | L | 0–4 | | 31,741 |
| 8 April 1939 | 22nd | Arsenal | H | L | 1–2 | Kendrick | 33,250 |
| 10 April 1939 | 22nd | Liverpool | H | D | 0–0 | | 15,067 |
| 15 April 1939 | 22nd | Brentford | A | W | 1–0 | Jones | 15,298 |
| 22 April 1939 | 21st | Blackpool | H | W | 2–1 | Craven, Harris | 21,812 |
| 26 April 1939 | 21st | Chelsea | H | D | 1–1 | Brown | 28,637 |
| 29 April 1939 | 21st | Leeds United | H | W | 4–0 | Brown, Scaife og, Morris 2 | 12,522 |

=== League table (part) ===
Final First Division table (part)
| Pos | Club | Pld | W | D | L | F | A | GA | Pts |
|---|---|---|---|---|---|---|---|---|---|
| 18th | Brentford | 42 | 14 | 8 | 20 | 53 | 74 | 0.72 | 36 |
| 19th | Huddersfield Town | 42 | 12 | 11 | 19 | 58 | 64 | 0.91 | 35 |
| 20th | Chelsea | 42 | 12 | 9 | 21 | 64 | 80 | 0.80 | 33 |
| 21st | Birmingham | 42 | 12 | 8 | 22 | 62 | 84 | 0.74 | 32 |
| 22nd | Leicester City | 42 | 9 | 11 | 22 | 48 | 82 | 0.58 | 29 |
| Key | Pos = League position; Pld = Matches played; W = Matches won; D = Matches drawn; L = Matches lost; F = Goals for; A = Goals against; GA = Goal average; Pts = Points | | | | | | | | |
| Source | | | | | | | | | |

== FA Cup ==
| Round | Date | Opponents | Venue | Result | Score F–A | Scorers | Attendance |
|---|---|---|---|---|---|---|---|
| Third round | 7 January 1939 | Halifax Town | H | W | 2–0 | Jennings, Phillips | 23,522 |
| Fourth round | 21 January 1939 | Chelmsford City | H | W | 6–0 | Harris, Brown, Jennings, Madden 2 | 44,494 |
| Fifth round | 11 February 1939 | Everton | H | D | 2–2 | Madden 2 | 67,341 |
| Fifth round replay | 15 February 1939 | Everton | A | L | 1–2 | Harris | 64,796 |

== Appearances and goals ==
This table includes appearances and goals in nationally organised competitive matches – the Football League and FA Cup – only.
For a description of the playing positions, see Formation (association football)#2–3–5 (Pyramid).
Players marked † left the club during the playing season.

Players' appearances and goals by competition
| Name | Position | League | | FA Cup | | Total | |
| Name | Position | Apps | Goals | Apps | Goals | Apps | Goals |
|---|---|---|---|---|---|---|---|
| Frank Clack | Goalkeeper | 24 | 0 | 4 | 0 | 28 | 0 |
| Harry Hibbs | Goalkeeper | 13 | 0 | 0 | 0 | 13 | 0 |
| Jack Wheeler | Goalkeeper | 5 | 0 | 0 | 0 | 5 | 0 |
| Billy Hughes | Full back | 35 | 0 | 4 | 0 | 39 | 0 |
| Willie Steel † | Full back | 11 | 0 | 0 | 0 | 11 | 0 |
| Ernie Sykes | Full back | 7 | 0 | 2 | 0 | 9 | 0 |
| Cyril Trigg | Full back | 30 | 1 | 2 | 0 | 32 | 1 |
| Norman Brunskill † | Half back | 7 | 0 | 0 | 0 | 7 | 0 |
| Dick Butler † | Half back | 2 | 0 | 0 | 0 | 2 | 0 |
| James Bye | Half back | 1 | 0 | 1 | 0 | 2 | 0 |
| Don Dearson | Half back | 39 | 3 | 3 | 0 | 42 | 3 |
| Wally Halsall | Half back | 21 | 0 | 2 | 0 | 23 | 0 |
| Bob Meacock | Half back | 13 | 0 | 2 | 0 | 15 | 0 |
| Dai Richards | Half back | 19 | 0 | 3 | 0 | 22 | 0 |
| Jack Shaw | Half back | 11 | 0 | 0 | 0 | 11 | 0 |
| Ray Shaw | Half back | 5 | 0 | 1 | 0 | 6 | 0 |
| Arthur Turner | Half back | 12 | 0 | 0 | 0 | 12 | 0 |
| Harold Bodle | Forward | 1 | 0 | 0 | 0 | 1 | 0 |
| Jackie Brown | Forward | 34 | 6 | 4 | 1 | 38 | 7 |
| Charlie Craven | Forward | 17 | 2 | 4 | 0 | 21 | 2 |
| Ted Duckhouse | Forward | 4 | 2 | 0 | 0 | 4 | 2 |
| Tom Farrage | Forward | 7 | 2 | 0 | 0 | 7 | 2 |
| Fred Harris | Forward | 37 | 14 | 4 | 3 | 41 | 17 |
| Dennis Jennings | Forward | 29 | 5 | 4 | 2 | 33 | 7 |
| Wilson Jones | Forward | 21 | 6 | 0 | 0 | 21 | 6 |
| Jack Kelly | Forward | 4 | 1 | 0 | 0 | 4 | 1 |
| Kenny Kendrick | Forward | 2 | 1 | 0 | 0 | 2 | 1 |
| Owen Madden | Forward | 5 | 0 | 3 | 4 | 8 | 4 |
| Geoffrey Moreland † | Forward | 4 | 0 | 0 | 0 | 4 | 0 |
| Seymour Morris | Forward | 14 | 5 | 0 | 0 | 14 | 5 |
| Charlie Phillips | Forward | 15 | 5 | 1 | 1 | 16 | 6 |
| Frank White † | Forward | 13 | 8 | 0 | 0 | 13 | 8 |

== Abandoned 1939–40 Football League season ==
Birmingham began the 1939–40 Football League season in the Second Division, but the onset of the Second World War caused the League to be abandoned after three Second Division matches had been played. They fielded the same eleven for all three matches: Harry Hibbs, Cyril Trigg, Billy Hughes, James Bye, Arthur Turner, Ray Shaw, Jackie Brown, Don Dearson, Ted Duckhouse, Fred Harris and Tom Farrage. Farrage was killed in action in September 1944, serving as a private in the 10th Battalion, the Parachute Regiment during Operation Market Garden.

Match results
| Date | Opponents | Venue | Result | Score F–A | Scorers | Attendance |
|---|---|---|---|---|---|---|
| 26 August 1939 | Tottenham Hotspur | A | D | 1–1 | Brown | 28,366 |
| 30 August 1939 | Leicester City | H | W | 2–0 | Farrage, Sharman og | 13,848 |
| 2 September 1939 | Burnley | H | W | 2–0 | Dearson, Duckhouse | 15,900 |
