= Tom Farrage =

Tom Farrage may refer to:

- Tom Farrage (footballer)
- Tom Farrage (designer)
