= Harry Parr =

Harry Parr may refer to:

- Harry Parr (footballer, born 1914) (1914 – after 1939), English football right half
- Harry Parr (footballer, born 1915) (1915–2004), English football forward

== See also ==
- Henry Parr (disambiguation)
- Harry Parr-Davies (1914–1955), Welsh composer and songwriter
