= Parr Hall =

Concert hall in Warrington, Cheshire, England

Coordinates: 53°23′14″N 2°35′52″W

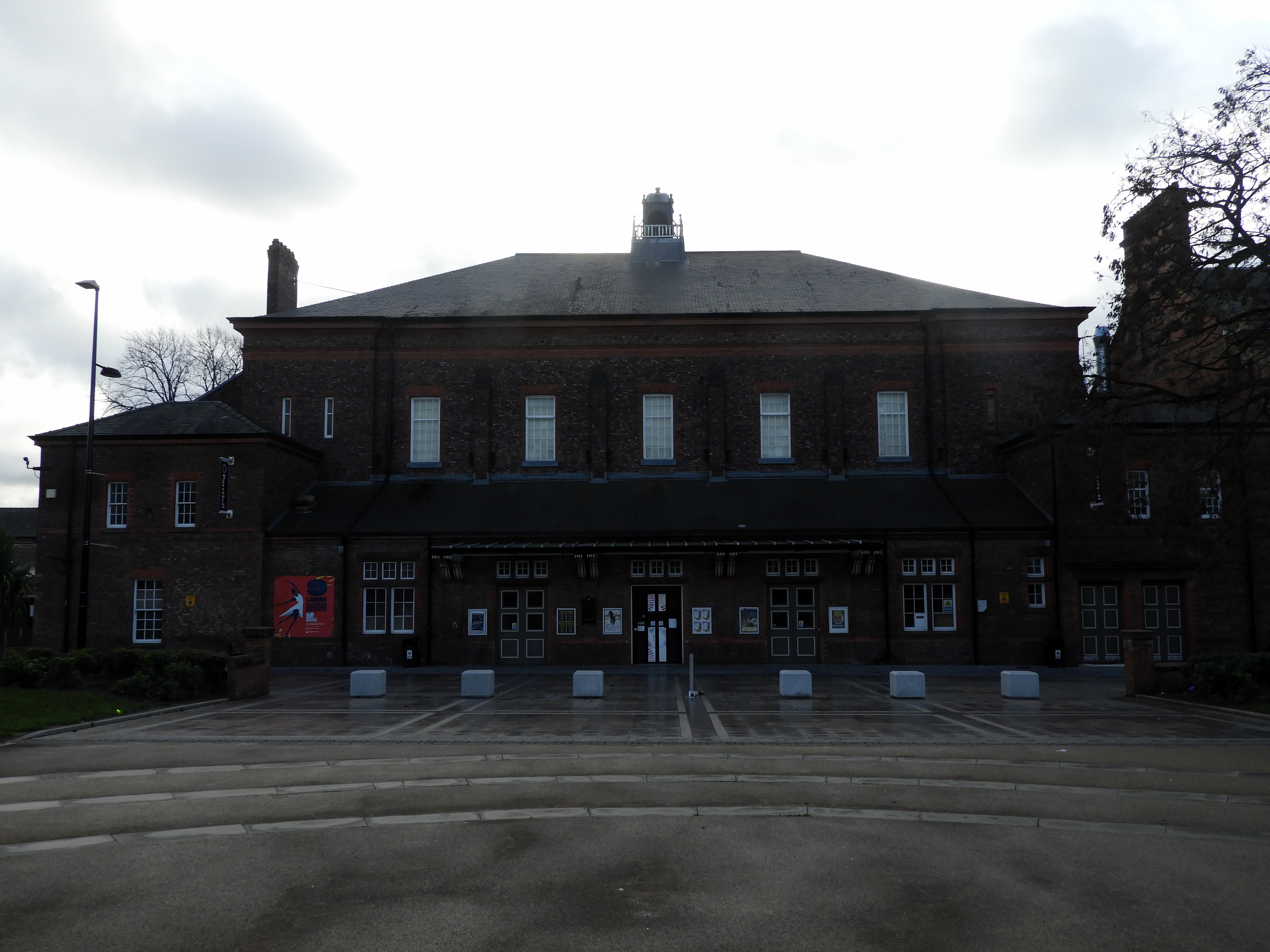
Parr Hall in 2018

The Parr Hall is the only surviving professional concert hall venue in Warrington, Cheshire, England. It is recorded in the National Heritage List for England as a designated Grade II listed building.

== Location ==
The Parr Hall and Pyramid Arts Centre are located in the cultural quarter of Warrington town centre, in Palmyra Square.

== History ==
Parr Hall was designed by the local architect William Owen in 1895.

Originally it was built for the people of Warrington by Joseph Parr. Warrington Musical Society gave the first concert.

The hall has hosted concerts and organ recitals from leading orchestras and cathedral organists over the years.

The Rolling Stones performed at the venue on 25 November 1963, The Moody Blues on 1 March 1965 and The Who on 22 March and 11 October 1965 and on 14 June 1965 The Yardbirds. The band James - having sold-out concerts at much larger venues - played the Parr Hall on 20 December 1991 to record a promotional video. Other notable artists such as Beth Hart, Feeder, The Courteeners, Beady Eye, Arctic Monkeys, Shane Filan of Westlife, and Steve Harley and Cockney Rebel (2001, 2013 and 2017) have played at the venue, and Jools Holland is a regular performer.

The Parr Hall has also hosted many famous comedians including Jimmy Carr and Andi Osho.

It has also been home since 1992 to the Warrington Scouts Gang Show.

The Warrington Male Voice Choir have been regular performers at the Hall for the past 100 years.

The Parr Hall was the chosen venue for the first Stone Roses concert since 1996 when the band announced a last-minute show on 23 May 2012. The gig was free of charge for fans, and the tickets were sold via a wristband system at the venue from 4pm on the day. Fans needed to produce either a CD inlay cover, record sleeve, official band T-shirt or a ticket for the Reunion Tour shows at Heaton Park when arriving at the venue.

== Cavaillé-Coll Organ ==
The Parr Hall is home to one of the few surviving unaltered pipe organs in the UK that was built by the great French organ builder Aristide Cavaillé-Coll (1811–99).

== Pyramid Arts Centre ==
In 1989 the borough council also saw a need for a better arts and theatre complex so re-developed the old courthouse and Centre Sport, sports hall next door into The Pyramid Arts Centre. The Pyramid, opened in 2002, hosts various classes throughout the year for people interested in discovering the arts. Pyramid also hosts a monthly Comedy Store Event, local band nights as well as having a varied programme of weekly classes. One of its studios was named in 2011 after the late Pete Postlethwaite.

== Other theatres in Warrington ==
In the past there were several other theatres/concert venues in Warrington but most have either been shut down, demolished or turned into pubs and clubs. The last proper theatre to close in the town was the Crosfield Centenary Theatre, originally run by Crosfield Chemical Company (now PQ Corporation), demolished in 1991. The land where this theatre stood is now a vacant fenced off patch of grass at the end of Sankey Street, due to local rules only allowing a theatre to be built on it.

Padgate Academy has a studio theatre which has hosted some notable productions.

Birchwood High School has a theatre which has hosted productions by WAspS Drama Group, a group for people in Warrington with Asperger's Syndrome. Also Birchwood High School stage has seen performances from Britain's Got Talent winner George Sampson, who was a pupil at the school.

Great Sankey High School also has a notable performance venue.

The new Warrington Collegiate has a new theatre, near Buckley's Restaurant on the Winwick Road Campus, and this has brought about many productions by the drama students in Warrington, including The Rocky Horror Show, which later went on to perform at the finals of the National Training Awards, and a one-off showcase at the Royal Horticultural Halls, London

== See also ==
- The Brindley, Runcorn
- Lyceum Theatre, Crewe
- Storyhouse, Chester
