= Payr =

Payr is a surname. Notable people with this surname include:

- Anna Payr (born 1981), Hungarian sailor
- Erwin Payr (1871–1946), Austrian-German surgeon
- Hugó Payr (1888–1976), Hungarian wrestler

== See also ==
- Parr (surname)
