= Henry Parr =

Henry Parr may refer to:

- Henry Parr (Lancashire cricketer) (1845–1930), English cricketer
- Henry Parr (Nottinghamshire cricketer) (1838–1863), English cricketer
- Henry Hallam Parr (1847–1914), British Army officer

== See also ==
- Harry Parr (disambiguation)
