= John Parr (disambiguation) =

John Parr (born 1952) is a British musician.

John Parr may also refer to:

- Sir John Parr (sheriff), sheriff of Westmoreland, c. 1462–1473, younger brother of William Parr, 1st Baron Parr of Kendal
- John Parr (embroiderer) (died 1607), English court artist
- John Parr (colonial governor) (1725–1791), British Army officer and Governor of Nova Scotia
- John Parr (gunmaker) (died 1798), English merchant and Mayor of Liverpool
- John Edmeston Parr (1856–1923), British-born Canadian architect
- John Parr (British Army soldier) (1898–1914), believed to have been the first British soldier killed in World War I
- John Wayne Parr (born 1976), Australian kickboxer
- John Parr (album), 1984 debut album by John Parr

== See also ==
- Parr (surname)
- Jack Parr (disambiguation)
