= Larry Parr =

Larry Parr may refer to:

- Larry Parr (chess player) (1946–2011), American chess player, author and editor
- Larry Parr (director), New Zealand film director and screenwriter

== See also ==
- Parr (surname)
