= Eleeshushe Parr =

Inuk graphic artist and sculptor (1896-1975)

- Born: June 9, 1896
- Died: February 1975 (aged 78)
- Known for: Print, drawing, textile, and sculpture
- Spouse: Parr

Eleeshushe Parr (Elishusee/Ilisusi/Elishushi/Elishusee/Elisusi/Illishushi/Parr Parr) (June 9, 1896 – February, 1975) was an Inuk graphic artist and sculptor, from the Kingnait area, who produced over 1,160 drawings. Her work has been exhibited in Canada, the United States, and Sweden.

== Background ==
Eleeshushe and her husband, the sculptor and printmaker Parr (1893-1969), lived a traditional nomadic lifestyle with their nine children, both biological and adopted. The couple settled in Cape Dorset Northwest Territories (now Nunavut), Canada in 1961, after her aging spouse suffered declining health and fell victim to frostbite, resulting in partial amputation of his right foot. Eleeshushe's children Nuna (b. 1949), Eepervik, and Quvianatuliak Parr (b. 1930) are also artists in Cape Dorset. Parr's grandson, Peter Parr (b. 1970), is also an artist.

== Artistic career ==
Eleeshushe began drawing during the formative years of Cape Dorset's printmaking. One of the more prolific Inuit artists she left over 1,000 prints in the archives of the West Baffin Eskimo Co-operative. Her drawings were included in the annual Cape Dorset Graphics Collection from 1966 to 1969. In 1970, the WBEC changed the name of its annual 'graphics' collection to 'print' collection. This 83 print collection, the 11th, was the last collection for Eleeshushe Parr. The collection opened on October 31 at 50 galleries, with the official opening at the Quest in Victoria, British Columbia. Eleeshushe also occasionally made carvings, and was recognized by her community for her designs and her ability to sew traditional skin garments with inset patterns.

Prints, such as "Boy Playing With Dogs" (1966), demonstrate Eleeshushe's typical depictions of animals, Inuit and elements of life in Northern Canada. In this specific work, a young Inuk boy plays with dogs, simulating a hunting scene where the dogs represent game and the boy is about to harpoon. The imitation of hunters is an important element in the education of boys. The stencilled drawing has soft shapes of little detail except for the boy's and animal's eyes, mouth and nose.

== Exhibitions ==
- 1993 - "Strange Scenes: Early Cape Dorset Drawings," McMichael Canadian Art Collection, Kleinburg, Ontario
- 1989 - "Inuit Graphic Art from Indian & Northern Affairs Canada," Winnipeg Art Gallery, Winnipeg, Manitoba
- 1985 - "Alaska Eskimo Dolls/Inuit Prints, Provincial Museum of Alberta," Edmonton, Alberta
- 1983-85 - "Grasp Tight the Old Ways: Selections from the Klamer Family Collection of Inuit Art," Art Gallery of Ontario, Toronto, Ontario

== Collections ==
- Winnipeg Art Gallery
- Art Gallery of Ontario
- Morris and Helen Belkin Art Gallery
- McMichael Canadian Art Collection
- Cape Dorset Print Collection
