= Billy Richards (footballer, born 1905) =

Welsh footballer

Personal information
- Full name: William Edward Richards
- Date of birth: August 1905
- Place of birth: Abercanaid, Wales
- Date of death: 30 September 1956 (aged 51)
- Place of death: Wolverhampton, England
- Height: 5 ft 8 in (1.73 m)
- Position: Outside forward

Senior career*
Years	Team	Apps	(Gls)
- Troedyrhiw Carlton
- Mid Rhondda United
1925–1926	Merthyr Town	1	(0)
1926–1929	Wolverhampton Wanderers	30	(2)
1929–1931	Coventry City	77	(12)
1931–1935	Fulham	76	(14)
1935–1937	Brighton & Hove Albion	44	(8)
1937–1938	Bristol Rovers	4	(0)
1938–19??	Folkestone		

International career
1932	Wales	1	(0)
- * Club domestic league appearances and goals

William Edward Richards (August 1905 – 30 September 1956) was a Welsh international footballer who played as an outside right. He made 232 appearances in the Football League playing for Merthyr Town, Wolverhampton Wanderers, Coventry City, Fulham, Brighton & Hove Albion and Bristol Rovers, and also played in the Southern League for Mid Rhondda United and Folkestone. He played once for the Wales national team, on 7 December 1932 against Ireland.

He was the older brother of Dai Richards, who also played for Wolverhampton Wanderers and Wales.
