= Matthew Parr =

Matthew Parr may refer to:

- Matthew Parr (figure skater) (born 1990), British figure skater
- Matthew Parr (racing driver) (born 1986), racing driver
- Matt Parr (born 1962), Royal Navy officer
