= Reunion Tour (The Stone Roses) =

2012–13 concert tour by the Stone Roses

- Tour by The Stone Roses
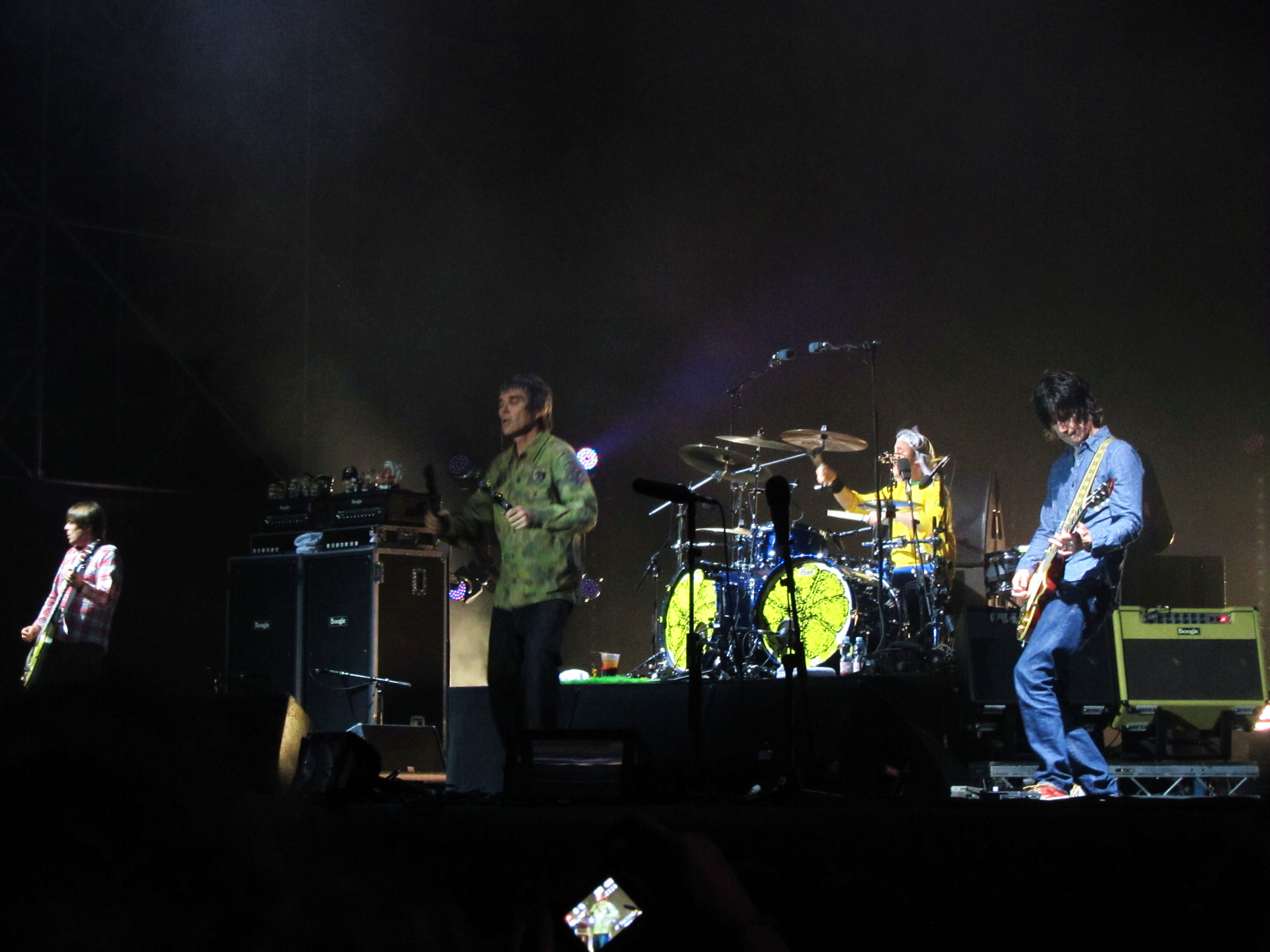
- The Stone Roses in concert in Milan, 17 July 2012
- Start date: 23 May 2012
- End date: 11 August 2013
- Legs: 8
- No. of shows: 30 in Europe; 8 in Asia; 9 in Oceania; 3 in North America; 50 in total

The Stone Roses concert chronology
- Second Coming Tour (1995–96); Reunion Tour (2012–13)

The Reunion Tour was a 2012—2013 rock concert tour by English band the Stone Roses. Three homecoming shows in Heaton Park, Manchester and a show in Phoenix Park, Dublin were the first shows to be announced by the band. Fifty shows eventually took place in Europe, Asia, North America and Oceania. The Heaton Park shows currently hold the record for the fastest selling rock gigs in UK history. The Irish Independent described the Dublin leg of the tour as "one of the most anticipated gigs of the year." The Stone Roses also re-entered the music charts on the back of the tour.

== History ==
Reports of a reunion initially surfaced during April 2011, with several media outlets claiming that singer Ian Brown and guitarist John Squire had reconciled for the first time since Squire left the band in 1996. At the time, these were swiftly denied by bassist Mani.

However, on 18 October of the same year, the band called a press conference to confirm their reunion and two homecoming shows at Heaton Park, Manchester on 29 and 30 June 2012. In addition to this, they also stated their intention to complete a reunion world tour and an album of new material.

All 150,000 tickets for the initial two Heaton Park shows sold out in a record 14 minutes. A third show scheduled for 1 July 2012 was promptly put on sale. In total, all 220,000 tickets for the shows sold out in 68 minutes - a record for a UK rock gig. Reviews for the Manchester shows were reported to be "bordering on the ecstatic." However, tragedy struck when a young fan went missing following the Friday show.

Whilst no specific dates were announced, during the reunion press conference Ian Brown stated that the band would visit Ireland, with Ian Brown saying "After Manchester, Ireland is always next on our list". Their Dublin date was announced as being for Phoenix Park on 5 July 2012, on the weekend normally reserved for the Oxegen music festival, which did not take place in 2012.

On 7 November 2011, three further dates were announced for festival headlining slots in Scotland, Spain and Japan.

== Schedule ==
On 15 December 2011, the band announced on their Facebook page, that they would play Germany's Hurricane and Southside Festivals in June, and the Sziget Festival in August 2012.

On 10 October 2012, it was confirmed that the band would tour Australia in 2013, headlining the Future Music Festival along with The Prodigy.

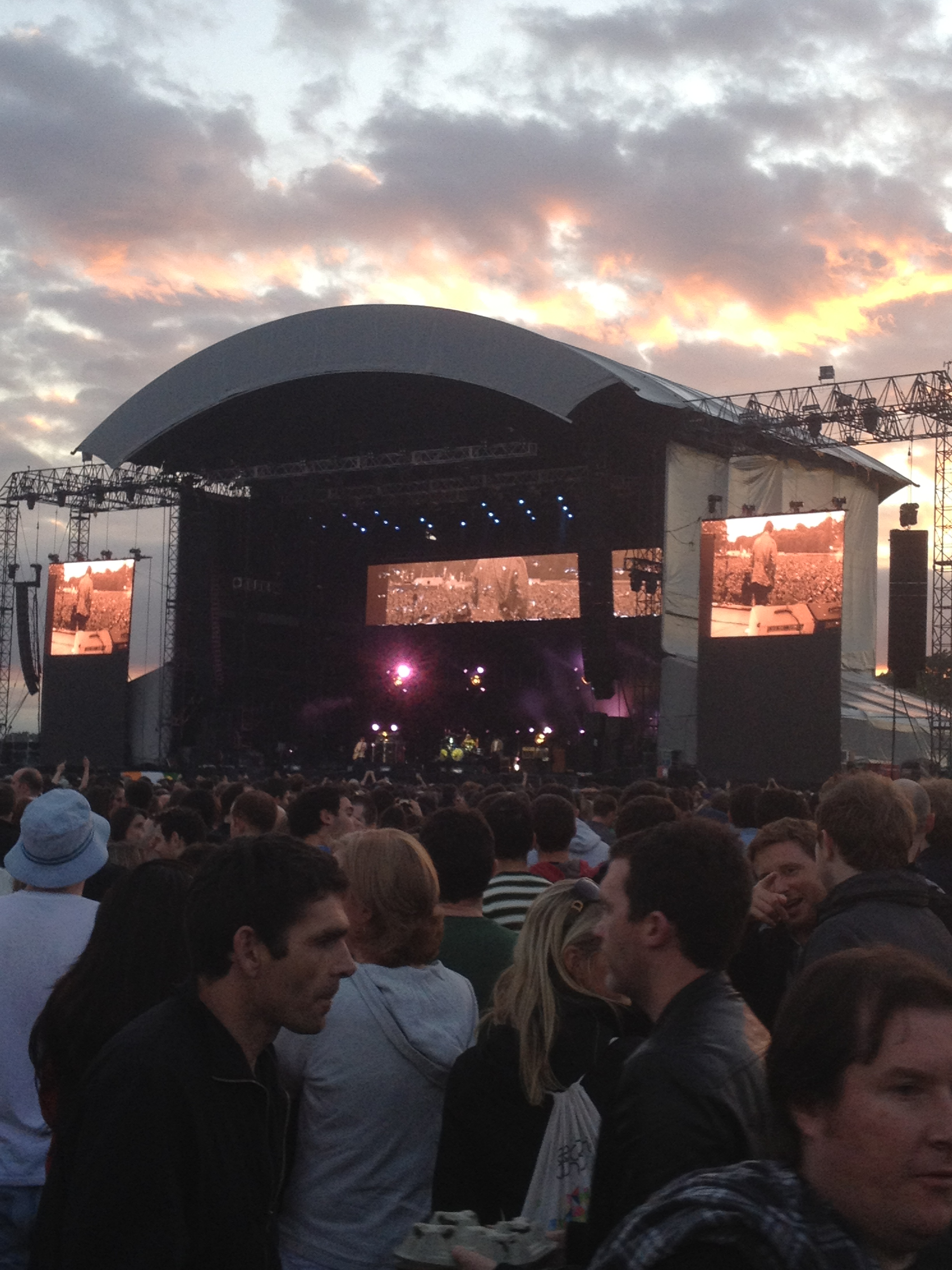
The Stone Roses playing Phoenix Park, Dublin during their 2012 Reunion tour.

== Tour dates ==
Date	City	Country	Venue	S
Leg 1: Europe
23 May 2012	Warrington	England	Parr Hall	1
8 June 2012	Barcelona	Spain	Razzmatazz	2
9 June 2012	Barcelona	Spain	Razzmatazz	3
12 June 2012	Amsterdam	Netherlands	Heineken Music Hall	4
14 June 2012	Hultsfred	Sweden	Folkets Park	5
16 June 2012	Aarhus	Denmark	Ådalen	6
22 June 2012	Scheeßel	Germany	Eichenring	7
24 June 2012	Neuhausen ob Eck	Germany	Neuhausen ob Eck Airfield	8
25 June 2012	Lyon	France	Théâtre antique de Fourvière	9
29 June 2012	Manchester	England	Heaton Park	10
30 June 2012	Manchester	England	Heaton Park	11
1 July 2012	Manchester	England	Heaton Park	12
5 July 2012	Dublin	Ireland	Phoenix Park	13
7 July 2012	Balado	Scotland	Balado Park & Airfield (T in the Park 2012)	14
13 July 2012	Lisbon	Portugal	Passeio Maritimo de Alges	15
14 July 2012	Benicàssim	Spain	Costa del Azahar	16
17 July 2012	Milan	Italy	Ippodromo del Galoppo	17
Leg 2: Asia
22 July 2012	Singapore		Singapore Indoor Stadium	18
24 July 2012	Hong Kong		AsiaWorld-Arena	19
27 July 2012	Yuzawa	Japan	Naeba Ski Resort	20
28–29 July 2012	Icheon	South Korea	Jisan Valley Ski Resort	21
Leg 3: Europe
6 August 2012	London	England	Village Underground	22
8 August 2012	Oslo	Norway	Middelalderparken	23
10 August 2012	Budapest	Hungary	Óbuda Island	24
17 August 2012	Kiewit	Belgium	Pukkelpop	25
18 August 2012	Chelmsford	England	Hylands Park	26
19 August 2012	Weston-under-Lizard	England	Weston Park	27
22 August 2012	Belfast	Northern Ireland	Boucher Road Playing Field	28
Leg 4: Asia
21 February 2013	Dubai	United Arab Emirates	Dubai Media City Amphitheatre	29
23 February 2013	Jakarta	Indonesia	Lapangan D-Senayan	30
Leg 5: Oceania
26 February 2013	Auckland	New Zealand	Vector Arena	31
1 March 2013	Brisbane	Australia	Riverstage	32
2 March 2013^{[A]}	Brisbane	Australia	Doomben Racecourse	33
3 March 2013^{[A]}	Joondalup	Australia	Arena Joondalup	34
6 March 2013	Sydney	Australia	Hordern Pavilion	35
7 March 2013	Melbourne	Australia	Festival Hall	36
9 March 2013^{[A]}	Sydney	Australia	Royal Randwick Racecourse	37
10 March 2013^{[A]}	Melbourne	Australia	Flemington Racecourse	38
11 March 2013^{[A]}	Adelaide	Australia	Bonython Park	39
Leg 6: North America
9 April 2013	Mexico City	Mexico	The Pepsi Center WTC	40
12 April 2013	Indio	United States	Coachella	41
19 April 2013	Indio	United States	Coachella	42
Leg 7: Europe
3 June 2013	Paris	France	La Cigale	43
4 June 2013	Paris	France	La Cigale	44
7 June 2013	London	England	Finsbury Park	45
8 June 2013	London	England	Finsbury Park	46
14 June 2013	Newport	England	Seaclose Park	47
15 June 2013	Glasgow	Scotland	Glasgow Green	48
Leg 8: Asia
August 9, 2013	Chiba	Japan	Makuhari Messe	49
August 11, 2013	Osaka	Japan	Maishima	50

Festivals and other miscellaneous performances

^{A} These concerts are a part of the "Future Music Festival"

Cancellations

12 August 2012	Buftea	Romania	Summer Well Festival	Cancelled due to intense weather conditions.

=== Box office score data ===
Venue	City	Tickets Sold / Available	Gross Revenue
Heaton Park	Manchester	217,948 / 217,948 (100%)	£11,400,323
