= Parr (artist) =

Canadian Inuk artist (1893-1969)

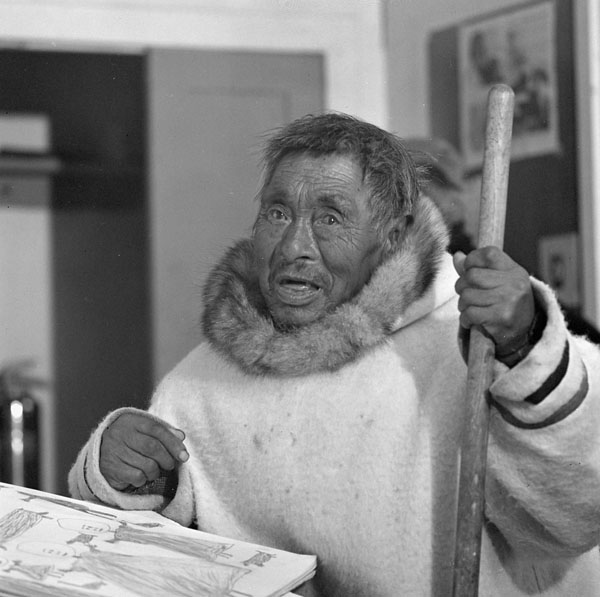
- Born: 1893; Southern Baffin Island, near Cape Dorset
- Died: November 3, 1969 (aged 75–76)
- Spouse: Eleeshushe Parr

Parr (1893 – 3 November, 1969) was an Inuk artist. He lived a traditional Inuit lifestyle until 1961, when he settled in Cape Dorset because of declining health and a hunting accident.

== Biography ==
Parr was born in 1893 in a campsite in the area of Kinngait on Southern Baffin Island, near Cape Dorset, Northwest Territories which is now Nunavut. The pair had a total of nine children, including several artists. His wife, Eleeshushe Parr, was also an Inuk artist.

While he lived a nomadic lifestyle as a hunter for much of his life, he settled in Kinngait in 1961 with his family as an accident in later life prevented him from continuing to hunt. He began drawing at age 68.

== Work ==
In Cape Dorset, Parr began to draw and make stonecut relief prints. He started with graphite, progressing to coloured pencils, and later felt tip pens. He created over 2,000 works in the next eight years. These are mainly images of hunting scenes, although Shamanic subjects are also depicted. In 1977, one of his prints was featured on a Canadian postage stamp. His drawings depict the shift in lifestyle between the semi-nomadic and the institutional. Parr found creativity for drawings through the introduction of drawing and printmaking in the WBEC studios.

His work is included in the permanent collections of several museums, including the National Gallery of Canada, the Musée national des beaux-arts du Québec, the University of Michigan Museum of Art, the Canadian Museum of History, the Dennos Museum Center, the National Museum of the American Indian, the British Museum, and the Museum of Modern Art.

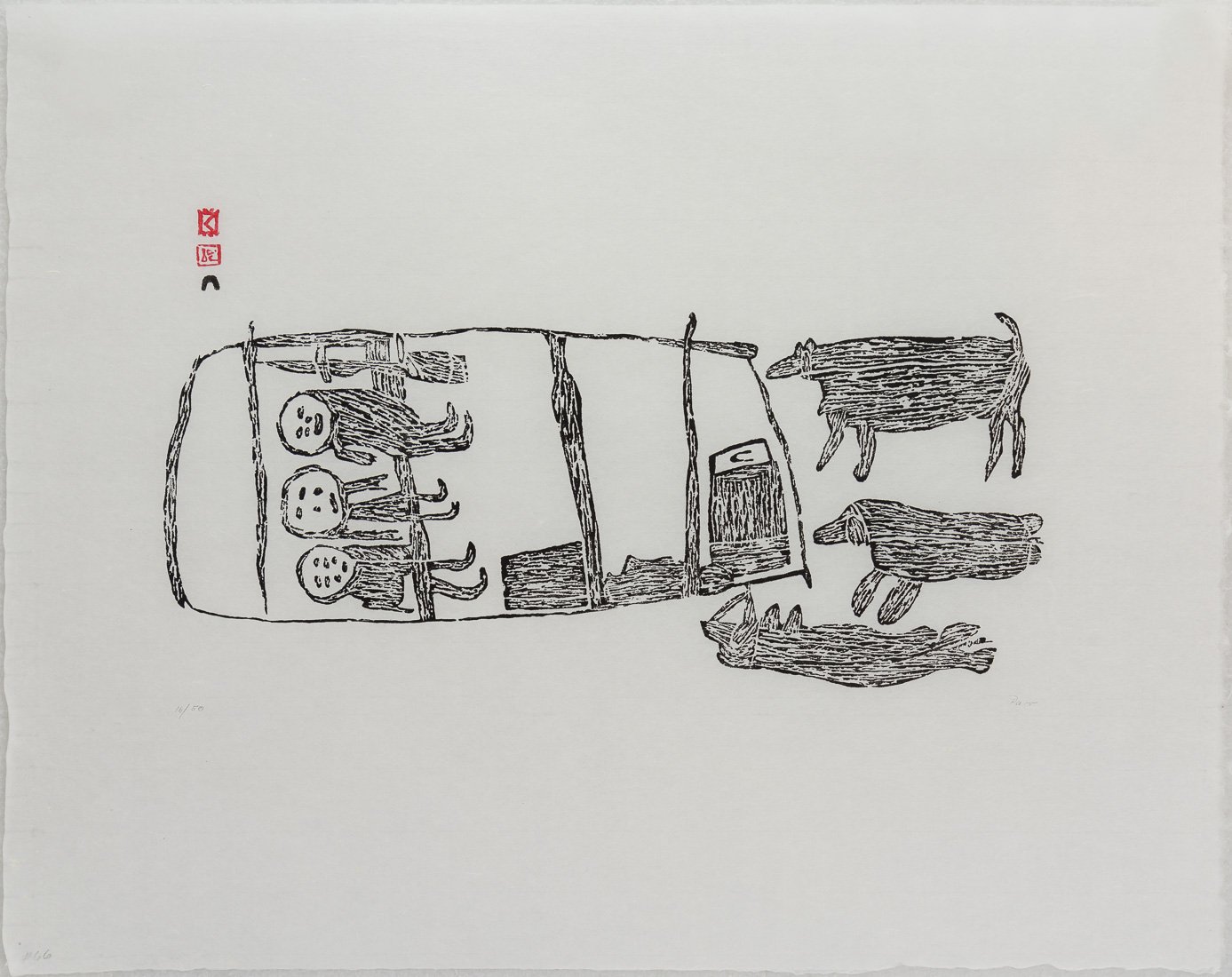
Day's End
