= Jack Kelly (English footballer) =

English footballer (1913–2000)

Personal information
- Full name: John Kelly
- Date of birth: 2 March 1913
- Place of birth: Hetton-le-Hole, England
- Date of death: 2000 (aged 86–87)
- Height: 5 ft 8 in (1.73 m)
- Positions: Centre forward; inside forward

Youth career
- Hetton Juniors

Senior career*
Years	Team	Apps	(Gls)
1930–1933	Burnley	30	(12)
1933–1935	Newcastle United	5	(1)
1935–1938	Leeds United	59	(17)
1938–1939	Birmingham	12	(1)
1939–194?	Bury^{[A]}	3	(1)
- * Club domestic league appearances and goals

John Kelly (2 March 1913 – 2000) was an English professional footballer who scored 32 goals from 109 appearances in the Football League playing for Burnley, Newcastle United, Leeds United, Birmingham and Bury.

== Career ==
Kelly was born in Hetton-le-Hole, County Durham. He played for his local junior side before joining Burnley, initially as an amateur, in October 1930. He made his debut in the Football League for Burnley, and joined Newcastle United as part of a player exchange deal in April 1933. He rarely appeared for Newcastle's first team, and moved on to Leeds United in February 1935 for a fee of £1,150. He was first choice at centre forward in the 1935–36 season, scoring 15 goals in 34 games in the First Division, but lost out the following season to Arthur Hydes. After a season and a half playing in the Central League with only occasional appearances for the first team, Kelly joined Birmingham in January 1938. He went straight into the starting eleven, but lost his place after eight games without a goal, and made only four appearances in the 1938–39 season. In May 1939 he joined Bury, but after three games and one goal the Football League was abandoned for the duration of the Second World War.

Kelly retired from the game during the war. He was a butcher by trade, and also worked part-time as a magician. He died in Hetton-le-Hole in 2000.

== Notes ==
A. These appearances and goal are for the 1939–40 Football League season abandoned when the Second World War started.
