= Tom Farrage (designer) =

American designer

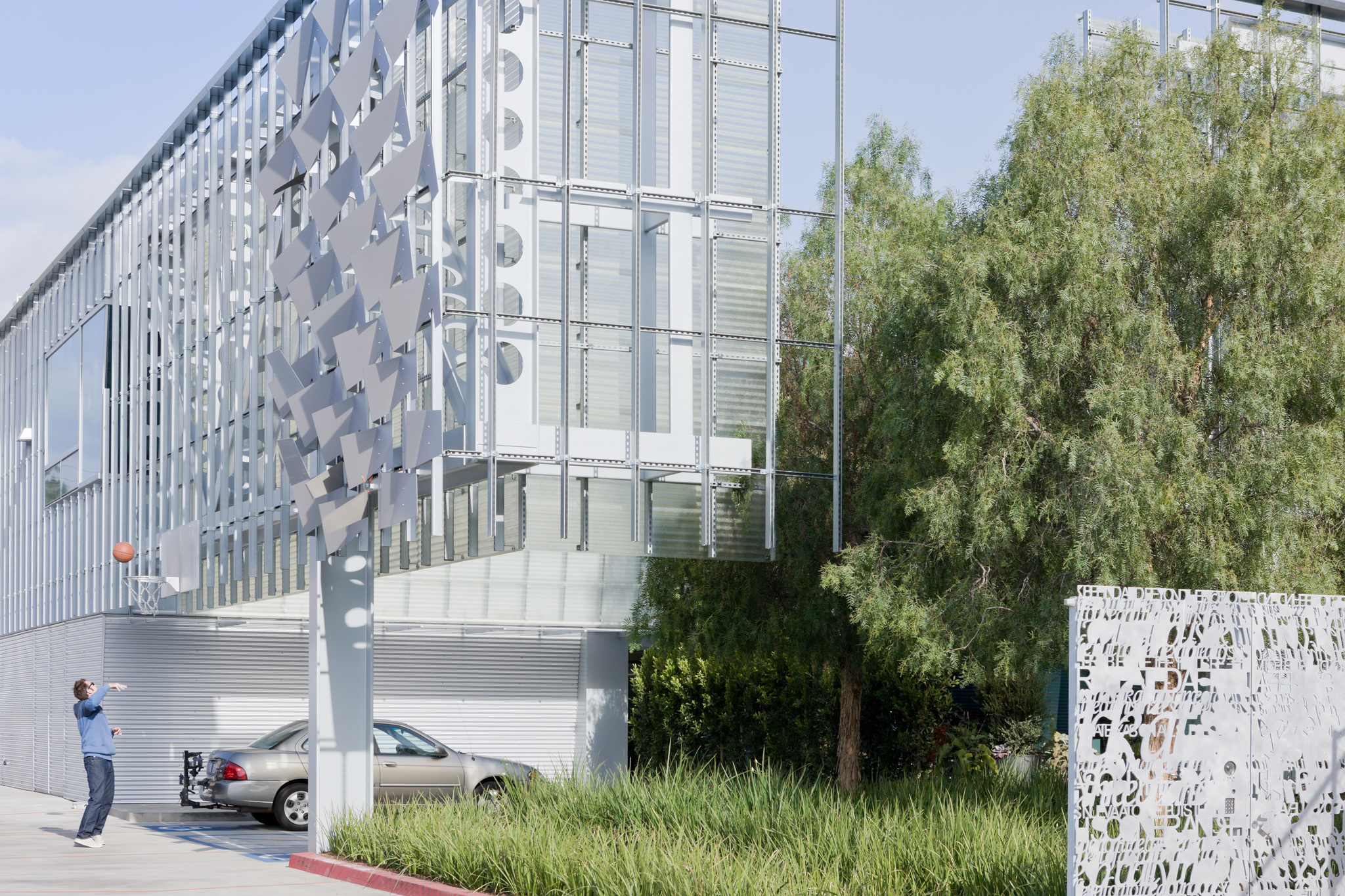
Art gate, facade, sliding wall at entrance atttMorphosis Studio in Culver City

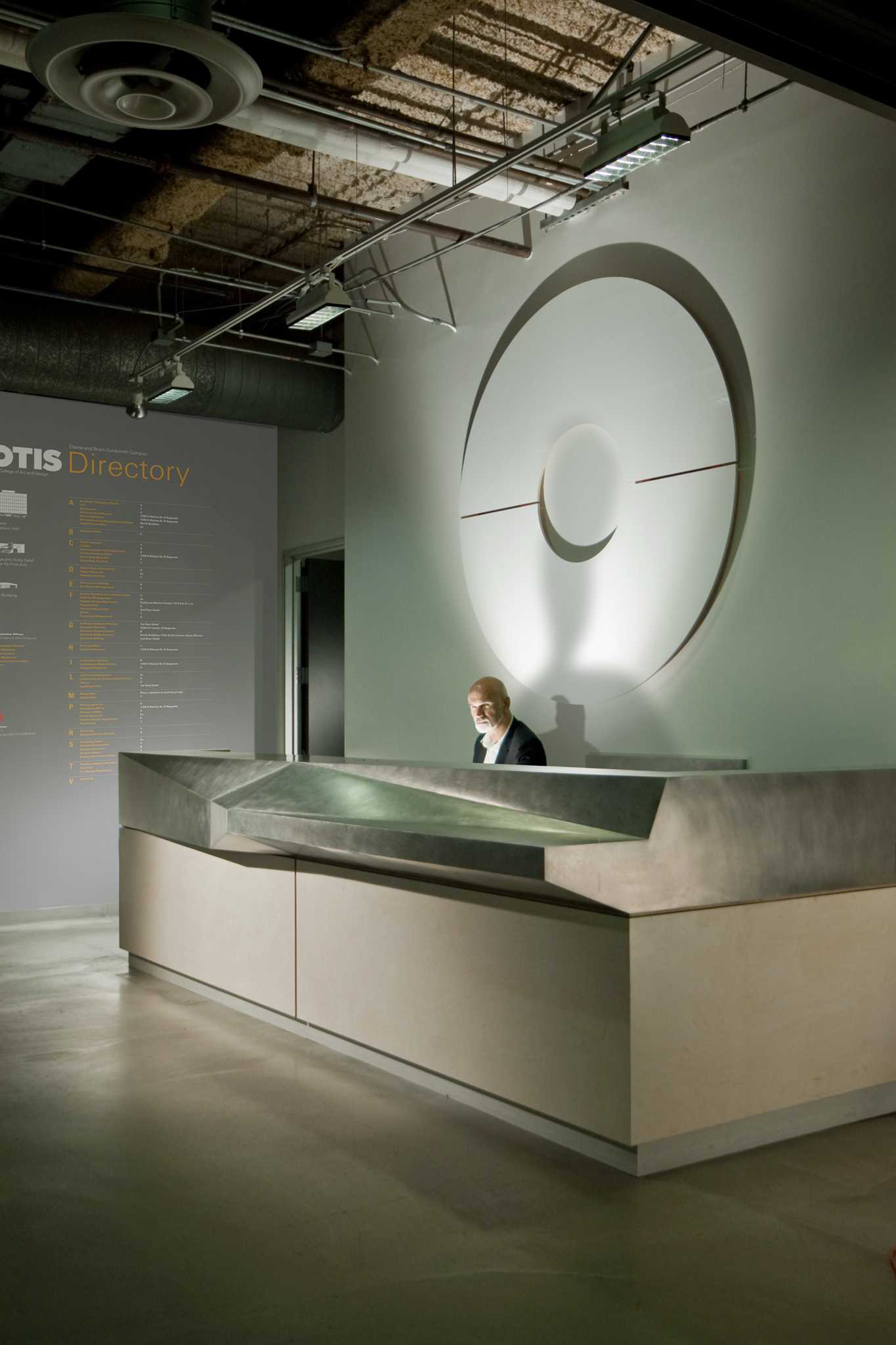
Wood and stainless steel entry sequence at Otis

Tom Farrage (born July 17, 1958, in Blythe, California) is a metal fabricator, craftsman and art collector who frequently collaborates with architects, artists, inventors, engineers, and filmmakers. Educated at the Southern California Institute of Architecture(1987), he works in steel, stainless steel, bronze, copper, aluminum; mixed media wood, plastic and glass. He has a long association with what has been called the “L.A. Avant Garde” award-winning architects Thom Mayne, Eric Owen Moss, Michael Rotondi, Craig Hodgetts, Frank Israel (b. 1945, d. 1996) and Frank Gehry. He is the owner of Farrage & Company, co-owner of Nakao::Farrage Architects in Culver City, California, and is also the trustee of the Nathan H. Shapira Archives, in Southern California.

== Tom Farrage and Company ==
Founded in 1987, the first shop opened across the street from SCI-Arc, on the corner of Berkeley and Nebraska Street, in Santa Monica. Thom Mayne was one of his first clients, arriving with plans for the Thom Mayne's 6th Street residence and a spaceship for his son Cooper. Wolf Prix of Coop Himmelb(l)au, Ray Kappe, Robert Graham, Rem Koolhaas, Gary Paige, Daly – Genik, Susan Narduli, Charles and Elizabeth Lee, and artist Lee Jaffe soon followed. The work has often been experimental, largely a collaboration with architects trying to break away from the limits of straight walls and flat surfaces characteristic of late Modernism.

== Tom Farrage's Philosophy ==
Tom Farrage continues designing and building on the micro and macro scales. He explained, “For me, metal work, which is my trade, and architecture, which is my avocation, are inseparable. Making small objects of steel bronze, stainless steel, aluminum, copper, titanium, wood, concrete and glass is a rehearsal in the small for architecture in the large.” He further expressed the collaborative process of working with other architects is a special opportunity bound to yield results that are sometimes expected, sometimes surprising. Tom prefers to begin work at the embryonic stage of the design process, augmenting his own training and development. In his design realm, he thrives to bridge the gap between a sketch and spaces people inhabit.

== Selected projects ==
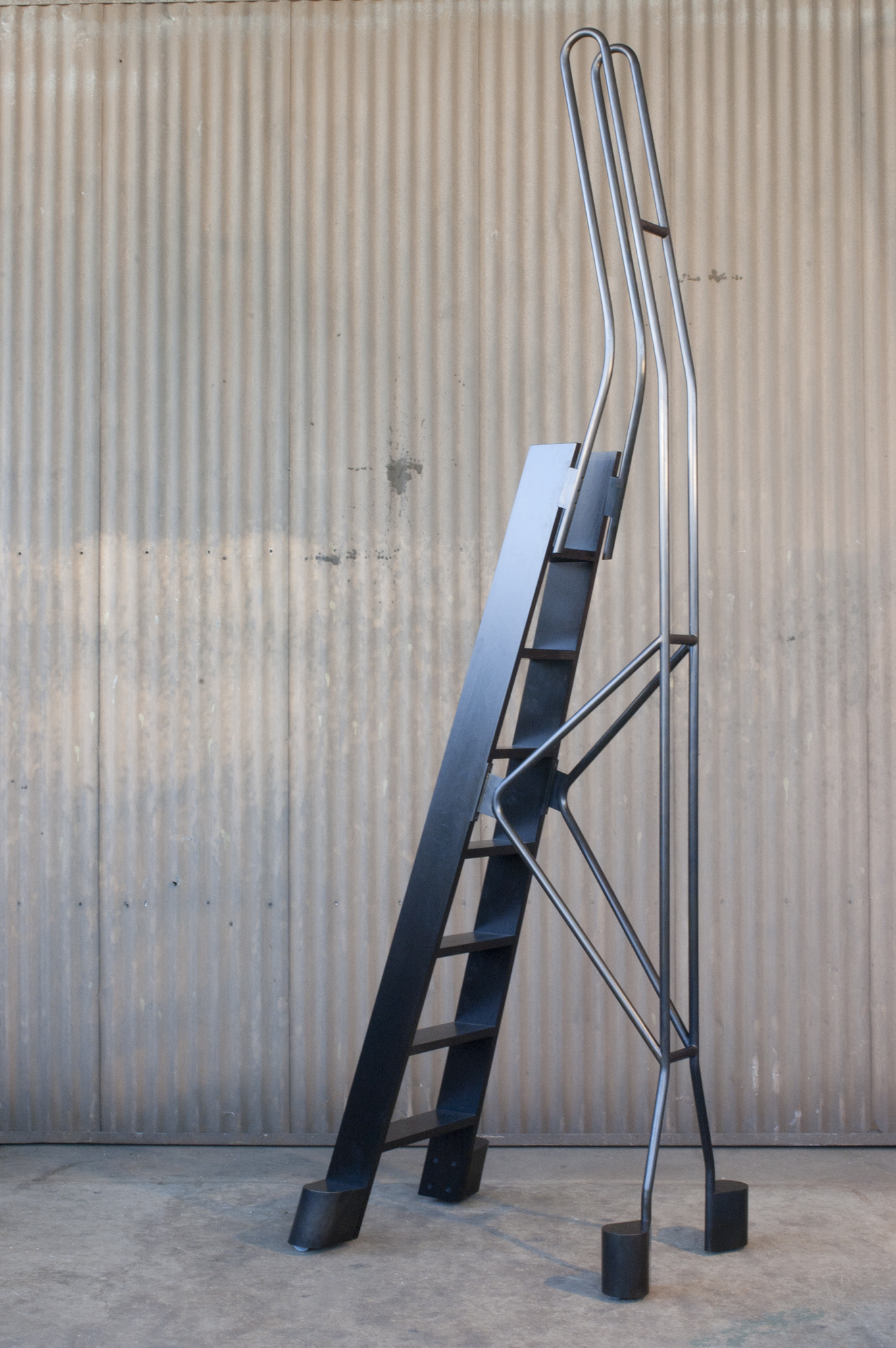
Tube steel with gun metal blued finish with walnut wood treads and retractable feet.

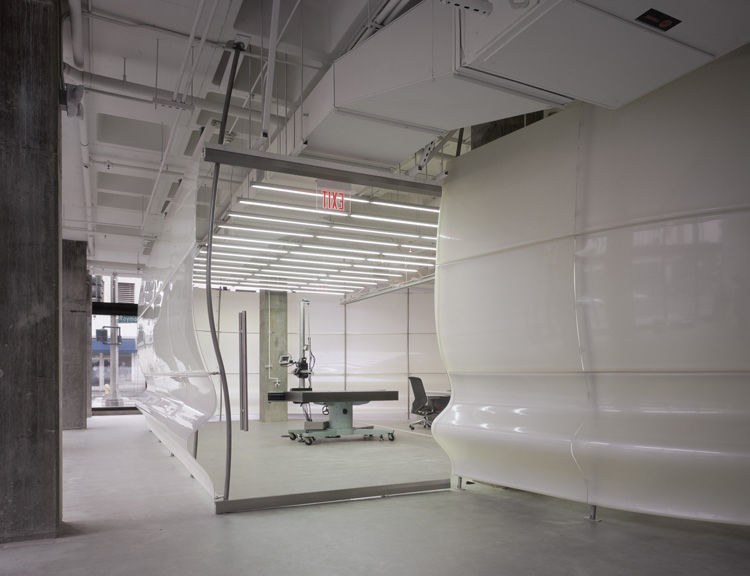
Interior by George Yu for Honda's Pasadena research facility

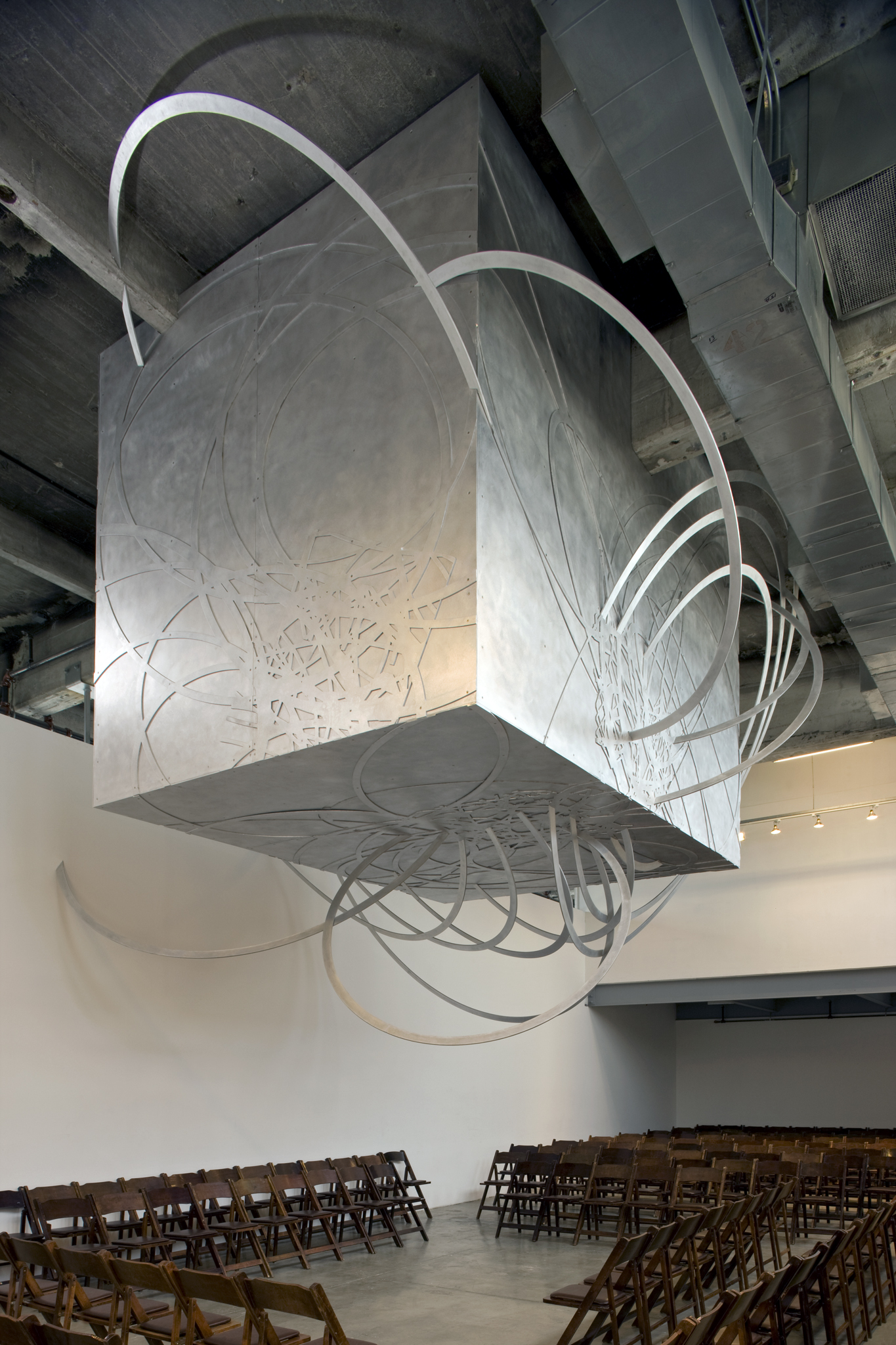
The Box at SciArc as a part of the "If Not Now, When?" show by Eric Owen Moss Architects

- Thom Mayne, SHR Perceptual Management, Scottsdale, Arizona
- Eric Owen Moss, If Not Now, When?, SCI-Arc Gallery
- Patrick Tighe, Moving Picture Company, Santa Monica, CA
- Richard Meier, Gil Friesen Residence, Los Angeles
- Nolan Bushnell, U-Wink Restaurants
- Nathan Mabry, Cherry and Martin Gallery
- Rem Koolhaas, Prada, Rodeo Dr.

== Other collaborations ==
- Dean Factor, Smashbox Studios
- Stavros Merjos, H S I Productions
- Circa 2-k Entertainment
- St. John Maron Catholic Church
- PVUSD, Appleby Elementary School

== Selected bibliography ==
- Michael Webb, Brave New Homes, Rizzoli 2003.
- International Architecture Yearbook no.6, Images Publishing.

== Awards ==
Best of Los Angeles, 2007

== Articles ==
- If Not Now, When? by Eric Owen Moss Architects
- Architectural Record
- Volume 5
- Los Angeles, August 2007.
- Frame, March/April 2003.
- Monument, 2002.
- LA Weekly, Feb. 2002
- LA Architects, November/December 2001.
- LA Architects, January/February 2000.
- Quaderni issue 19, 1997
- Domus No. 737, 1992
