= Rose Marie Parr =

Rose Marie Parr OBE FRPharmS is the Chief Pharmaceutical Officer for Scotland. She is an honorary professor at both Scottish Schools of Pharmacy.

== Early life ==
Parr studied at the University of Strathclyde graduating with a BSc (hons) in pharmacy degree then also a MSc degree. She then completed a Doctorate in Education at the University of Glasgow.

== Career ==
She gained her registration in 1982 and began working as a hospital pharmacist with Lanarkshire Health Board.

In 1993, Parr became Director of pharmacy at the Scottish Centre for Pharmacy Postgraduate Education (SCPPE) which would later become the Scottish Centre for Post Qualification Education. Parr became the Director of Pharmacy of NHS Education for Scotland (NES) in 2002, when several healthcare education organisations joined to form a single national body.

In 2004, Parr was appointed as an honorary reader at the Robert Gordon University in Aberdeen. She is a visiting professor at the University of Strathclyde in Glasgow.

In 2007, Parr was elected the first Chair of the Scottish Pharmacy Board of the Royal Pharmaceutical Society of Great Britain (RPSGB).

In April 2015, Parr was appointed Chief Pharmaceutical Officer for Scotland following the retirement of Professor Bill Scott from the post in March 2015.
