= William Parr =

William Parr may refer to:

- William Parr (died 1483) (1434–1483), English courtier and soldier
- William Parr, 1st Baron Parr of Horton (c. 1483–1547), English courtier
- William Parr, 1st Marquess of Northampton (1513–1571), English courtier, brother of Catherine Parr
- William Parr (explorer), Australian explorer
- William Parr (footballer) (1915–1942), English footballer
- William Parr (1813 convict), British convict transported to New South Wales in 1813
