= Samuel Bellamy (footballer) =

English footballer (1913–2005)

Personal information
- Full name: Samuel Charles Bellamy
- Date of birth: 2 November 1913
- Place of birth: Small Heath, Birmingham, England
- Date of death: 4 June 2005 (aged 91)
- Place of death: Solihull, England
- Height: 5 ft 8 in (1.73 m)
- Position: Full back

Youth career
- St Andrew's OSL

Senior career*
| Years | Team | Apps | (Gls) |
| 1937–1947 | Birmingham | 1 | (0) |
| 1947–1951 | Tamworth | | |
- * Club domestic league appearances and goals

Samuel Charles Bellamy (2 November 1913 – 4 June 2005) was an English professional footballer who played as a full back in the Football League for Birmingham.

== Life and career ==
Bellamy was born in 1913 in the Small Heath district of Birmingham, the son of Samuel Bellamy, a labourer, and his wife, Eliza née Kempson. A full back, he played youth football for St Andrew's OSL before moving into adult local football. By 1936, he had played as an amateur for Birmingham's third team as well as having trials with Aston Villa. He answered Birmingham Combination club Tamworth's advertisement for players, and got through to the final trial, but chose to continue on Birmingham's books as an amateur, "figured with considerable success in the third team" during the 1936–37 season, and was signed as a professional.

He made his first senior competitive appearance for the club on 13 November 1937, deputising for the injured Cyril Trigg against Blackpool in the First Division. Birmingham won 3–0, which was their first away win of the season. He was retained for the 1938–39 season, and was a regular in the reserve team in the Central League, mainly at left back; in the last match of the season, he suffered a concussion and was taken to hospital. He made no more first-team appearances before the Football League was suspended for the duration of the Second World War.

When war broke out, Bellamy was a single man living with his parents and three younger siblings in Graham Road, Yardley. He worked for Revo Electric, manufacturers of domestic equipment, as an assembler. He played football for Revo's works team, as well as appearing occasionally for Birmingham in the various wartime competitions, before joining the Army in 1940. He spent time serving in the Middle East. Bellamy rejoined Birmingham after the war, appeared for their Central League team, and was given a free transfer at the end of the 1946–47 season.

He signed for Tamworth – eleven years after his trial with the club – and was a first-team regular for three seasons. However, a knee injury in April 1950 and another injury early in the following season, by which time he was 37 years old, hastened the end of his senior career.

Bellamy died in Solihull in 2005 at the age of 91.

== Sources ==
- Joyce, Michael (2004). Football League Players' Records 1888 to 1939. Nottingham: SoccerData. ISBN 978-1-899468-67-6.
- Matthews, Tony (1995). Birmingham City: A Complete Record. Derby: Breedon Books. ISBN 978-1-85983-010-9.
