= Jack Parr (disambiguation) =

Jack Parr (1936–2015) was an American professional basketball player.

Jack Parr may refer to:

- Jackie Parr (1920–1985), English Football League footballer
- Jack-Jack Parr, a character from The Incredibles

== See also ==
- Jack Paar (1918–2004), American talk show host
