= Billy Hughes (footballer, born 1918) =

Welsh footballer

Personal information
- Full name: William Marshall Hughes
- Date of birth: 6 March 1918
- Place of birth: Llanelli, Wales
- Date of death: 16 June 1981 (aged 63)
- Place of death: Birmingham, England
- Height: 6 ft 2 in (1.88 m)
- Position: Left back

Senior career*
Years	Team	Apps	(Gls)
1934–1935	Llanelli		
1935	→ Swansea Town (loan)		
1935–1947	Birmingham	104	(0)
	→ (wartime)	49	(0)
1940–1941	→ Blackpool (guest)	8	(0)
1940–1941	→ Swansea Town (guest)	1	(0)
1942–1943	→ Fulham (guest)	2	(0)
1942–1945	→ Chester (guest)	50	(19)
1947–1948	Luton Town	31	(0)
1948–1951	Chelsea	93	(0)
1951–1954	Hereford United		
1954–1955	Flint Town United		

International career
1937–1947	Wales	10	(0)
	→ (wartime)	14	(0)
1944	FA Combined Services XI		
1944	Royal Air Force XI		
1947	Great Britain XI	1	(0)
- * Club domestic league appearances and goals

William Marshall Hughes (6 March 1918 – 16 June 1981) was a Welsh professional footballer who played as a left back. He made 169 appearances in the First Division for Birmingham and Chelsea. As an international, he won 10 full caps for Wales and also played for a Great Britain XI in 1947.

== Career ==
=== Club career ===
Born in Llanelli, Hughes joined Birmingham from Llanelli A.F.C. in 1934 and made his first-team debut in January 1936 when still only 17; by the time he was 19 he was a regular first choice. He was mature for his age and was described as a ball-winning defender who tried to use the ball constructively once he won it. During the Second World War he made 49 wartime league appearances for Birmingham. While serving in the Royal Air Force he made guest appearances for Blackpool, Swansea Town, Fulham and Chester. In all he played 110 senior games for Birmingham before joining Luton Town; eight months later they sold him for £12,000 to Chelsea, for whom he also played more than 100 games. He then moved to Hereford United, who were then playing in the Southern League, followed by Flint Town United, with whom he won his only major club honour, the Welsh Cup, in 1954.

=== International career ===
Hughes made his international debut for Wales on 30 October 1937 in a 2–1 win over Scotland; he was only 19 and played alongside Birmingham clubmates Seymour Morris and Dai Richards. From that match until the outbreak of the Second World War, Hughes was an ever-present in the Welsh side. He also played in 14 of Wales' 17 wartime and Victory internationals, and later captained the team during the 1947 British Home Championship. In 1944 he toured France and Belgium with an FA Combined Services XI. On 25 November 1944, at Hillsborough, he also played for a Royal Air Force XI in a 7–1 defeat against Scotland. His teammates on the day included, among others, Stanley Matthews, Stan Mortensen, Raich Carter and Frank Soo. In 1947 he also played for a Great Britain XI against a Rest of Europe XI to celebrate the return of the Home Nations to FIFA.

=== Later years ===
After retiring from playing, Hughes scouted for Chester. He died in Birmingham in 1981 at the age of 63.

== Honours ==
with Wales

- British Home Championship (shared): 1939

with Flint Town United

- Welsh Cup winners: 1954
