= Henry Parr (Lancashire cricketer) =

English cricketer (1845–1930)

Henry Bingham Parr (6 June 1845 – 24 March 1930) was an English cricketer active from 1872 to 1876 who played for Lancashire. He was born in Grappenhall and died in Liverpool. He appeared in 11 first-class matches as a righthanded batsman, scoring 180 runs with a highest score of 61 and held four catches.
