= Kingnait Pass =

Mountain pass in Nunavut, Canada

Joss Pass
- Location within Nunavut

Third Approach
- Location: Nunavut, Canada
- Coordinates: 66°28′45″N 064°10′15″W
- Topo map: NTS 26I8 Kingnait Pass

Kingnait Pass is the unofficial name for a mountain pass in the southern Baffin Mountains, Nunavut, Canada.
