= Judy Margaret Parr =

New Zealand educational psychology academic

Judy M. Parr
- Other name: Judith Margaret Parr

Academic background
- Education: Australian National University
- Thesis: Revision in writing: cognitive and linguistic aspects (1989)

Academic work
- Discipline: Psychologist
- Sub-discipline: Educational psychology
- Institutions: University of Auckland
- Main interests: Literacy, writing

Judith Margaret Parr (née Grant) is a New Zealand educational psychology academic. She is a full professor at the University of Auckland.

== Academic career ==
After a secondary education at Matamata College (where her father was a teacher) and an undergraduate at the University of Auckland, Parr did a 1989 PhD at Australian National University titled "Revision in writing: cognitive and linguistic aspects". She then returned to Auckland and became a full professor in 2011.

Parr's research interests centre on literacy, particularly writing and has led to the publication of many documents for the Ministry of Education.

== Selected works ==
- Griffiths, Carol, and Judy M. Parr. "Language-learning strategies: Theory and perception." ELT journal 55, no. 3 (2001): 247–254.
- Parr, Judy M., and Helen S. Timperley. "Feedback to writing, assessment for teaching and learning and student progress." Assessing writing 15, no. 2 (2010): 68–85.
- Ward, Lorrae, and Judy M. Parr. "Revisiting and reframing use: Implications for the integration of ICT." Computers & Education 54, no. 1 (2010): 113–122.
- Parr, Judy M. "Extending educational computing: A case of extensive teacher development and support." Journal of Research on Computing in Education 31, no. 3 (1999): 280–291.
- Parr, Judy M., and Irene YY Fung. A review of the literature on computer-assisted learning, particularly integrated learning systems, and outcomes with respect to literacy and numeracy. Auckland Uniservices, University of Auckland, 2000.
