= Matthew Parr (racing driver) =

- Nationality: (United Kingdom) British
- Born: 17 July 1986 (age 40)
- Debut season: 2008
- Current team: -
- Car number: 33
- Former teams: West-tec
- Starts: -
- Wins: -
- Poles: -
- Best finish: 1st in 2009

Championship titles
- Champion of Brands 2010

Matthew Parr (born 17 July 1986) is a British racing driver from Horsham, West Sussex who currently competes in Formula Ford 1600.

== Career ==
Matthew Parr starting racing go-karts aged 8. In 2008 he moved up to race in Formula Ford 1600 with Team West-Tec finishing 2nd in the Formula Ford M/S Championship. In the same year he also competed in the Formula Ford Festival, the Walter Hayes Trophy and came second in the 2008 Powernights Event.

In 2009 he moved teams to race with newly formed Unitec Motorsport and competed in the Formula Ford 1600 National Championship finishing in 4th place overall, including 1 win at Brands Hatch.

For 2010 he had intended to race in the British Formula Ford Championship, but could not find the required funding to compete in the series. Instead he is currently racing for Unitec Motorsport in Formula Ford 1600 and has won the Champion of Brands.

Season	Series	Team	Races	Wins	Poles	F/Laps	Podiums	Points	Position
2008	Formula Ford 1600 M/S Championship	Team West-Tec	11	0	0	0	5	196	2nd
2008	Formula Ford 1600 Powernights	Team West-Tec	2	0	0	1	1	-	2nd
2009	Formula Ford 1600 National Championship	Unitec Motorsport	12	1	0	0	2	93	4th
2010	Formula Ford 1600 Champion of Brands	Unitec Motorsport	3	1	2	1	1	-	-
