= James Parr =

James Parr may refer to:

- James Parr (baseball) (born 1986), American baseball player
- James Parr (politician) (1869–1941), New Zealand lawyer and politician
- Jim Parr (1928–2000), full name James Gordon Parr, Canadian academic, broadcaster and provincial civil servant
