= Elizabeth Parr =

Elizabeth Parr may refer to:

- Elisabeth Parr, Marchioness of Northampton, née Brooke, wife of William Parr
- Elizabeth Parr-Johnston, Managing Partner of Parr-Johnston Consultants
