= Susan Narduli =

American artist and architect

Susan Narduli is a Los Angeles–based artist and architect who works at the intersection of art, media, technology and architecture. She leads an interdisciplinary art studio with a focus on design research and is director of experiential and interactive projects for Cheeky Films.

Narduli has a Bachelor of Fine Arts and Master of Architecture from UCLA's School of Architecture and Urban Design, and is currently a licensed architect. Her Narduli Studio, located in the Los Angeles area, has received many awards throughout the years, including the Americans for the Arts Year in Review PAN Award in 2017, 2012 and 2010, a CODA Merit Award, the AIA Award of Excellence, and the AIA Honor Award. Prior to having her own studio, Narduli worked as a project designer for Frank Gehry, collaborated on public art projects with Liz Larner and partnered with Gemini GEL founder Elise Grinstein.

== Works ==
1. ConvergenceLA (2017) with Refik Anadol, Metropolis Towers, Los Angeles
2. Land and Time (2011) Natural History Museum Salt Lake City, UT
3. Light Wash (2007) Little Tokyo Arts District Los Angeles, CA
4. San Francisco Veterans Memorial (2014) Civic Center, San Francisco
5. Weaving (2009) CSU Fresno
6. The Wonders of the Heavens and Flying (2001) Los Angeles International Airport
