= Norman Brunskill =

English footballer (1912–1988)

Personal information
- Date of birth: 14 June 1912
- Place of birth: Dipton, County Durham, England
- Date of death: 28 February 1988 (aged 75)
- Place of death: Boston, England
- Height: 6 ft 0 in (1.83 m)
- Position: Wing half

Senior career*
Years	Team	Apps	(Gls)
- Lintz Colliery
1930–1932	Huddersfield Town	0	(0)
1932–1936	Oldham Athletic	143	(10)
1936–1938	Birmingham	63	(2)
1938–1946	Barnsley	31	(2)
- * Club domestic league appearances and goals

Norman H. Brunskill (14 June 1912 – 28 February 1988) was an English professional footballer who played as a wing half. He made nearly 250 appearances in the Football League playing for Oldham Athletic, Birmingham and Barnsley.

Born in Dipton, near Stanley, County Durham, Brunskill worked as a coal miner and began his football career with works team Lintz Colliery F.C. A trial with Newcastle United came to nothing, but in October 1930 he signed for Huddersfield Town as an amateur, signing professional forms at the end of the 1930–31 season. The following season produced no first-team appearances so he moved on to Oldham Athletic, where he spent four seasons before Birmingham paid £1,300 for his services. After two years and 65 appearances in all competitions, he joined Barnsley, with whom he won the championship of the Third Division (North) in 1938–39. During the Second World War he made guest appearances for Middlesbrough and Hartlepools United, and was released from his contract with Barnsley at the end of the war. He died in Boston, Lincolnshire, aged 75.
