= Henry Parr (Nottinghamshire cricketer) =

English cricketer

Henry John Parr (7 January 1838 – 24 April 1863) was an English first-class cricketer active 1856–58 who played for Nottinghamshire. He was born and died in Radcliffe-on-Trent.
