= Anne Parr =

Anne Parr may refer to:

- Anne Bourchier, 7th Baroness Bourchier (1517–1571), married name Anne Parr, wife of William Parr, 1st Marquess of Northampton
- Anne Parr, Lady Herbert (1515–1552), sister and lady-in-waiting to Katherine Parr, sixth wife of Henry VIII of England and sister-in-law of the above
