= Thomas Parr =

Thomas Parr may refer to:

- Old Tom Parr (reputedly 1483–1635), English supercentenarian who claimed to have lived for 152 years
- Thomas Parr (MP for Westmorland) (1407–1461); English landowner, MP and under-sheriff of Westmorland
- Thomas Parr (died 1517) (c. 1483–1517), English courtier and father of Queen Katherine Parr
- Thomas Parr (of Bencoolen) (died 1807), British resident in Bencoolen, commemorated in the Thomas Parr Monument
- Thomas Johannes Lauritz Parr (1862-1935), Norwegian educator
- Thomas Parr (slave trader), (1769-1847), English slave trader
