= Jack Shaw (footballer, born 1916) =

English footballer

Personal information
- Full name: John Shaw
- Date of birth: 2 October 1916
- Place of birth: Oldham, England
- Date of death: 22 October 1973 (aged 57)
- Place of death: Shaw, England
- Positions: Wing half; centre half

Senior career*
Years	Team	Apps	(Gls)
- South Shore Wesleyans
1933–1934	Lytham		
1934–1936	Oldham Athletic	2	(0)
1936–1937	Mossley		
1937–1939	Grimsby Town	7	(0)
1939–1945	Birmingham	11	(0)
1945–1946	Watford	0	(0)
1946–1951	Mossley		
- * Club domestic league appearances and goals

John Shaw (2 October 1916 – 22 October 1973) was an English professional footballer who played in the Football League for Oldham Athletic, Grimsby Town and Birmingham. He played as a wing half or centre half.

== Life and career ==
Shaw was born in Oldham, Lancashire. A nephew of George Tyson, who played Rugby league for Oldham and Great Britain, Shaw played local football for South Shore Wesleyans and for Lytham before joining Oldham Athletic in 1934. He appeared only twice in the Football League in two seasons with Oldham, and joined Mossley of the Cheshire County League, where he made 44 appearances in all competitions in the 1936–37 season. Returning to the Football League with Grimsby Town, he played seven First Division games before moving on to fellow First Division club Birmingham. He went straight into the starting eleven, and played 11 consecutive games, but the team failed to avoid relegation. The outbreak of the Second World War meant Shaw was unable to establish himself with the club.

He joined Watford in 1945, but returned to Mossley before the Football League resumed after the war. In his first season back he made 50 appearances, and "was to continue as the first name on the team sheet for the next five years" until he retired from the game at the end of the 1950–51 season after 238 games in all competitions. Though with Birmingham he played as a "destructive" left half, Mossley describe him as a "skilful and dominating centre half". He was the star player in Mossley's 1949–50 FA Cup run which took them victorious through seven rounds of the competition, starting from the Extra preliminary round, to eventual defeat in the second round proper after a replay.

Shaw died in 1973 in Shaw, Lancashire, at the age of 57.
