= Kenny Kendrick =

English footballer

Personal information
- Full name: Kenneth Kendrick
- Date of birth: May 1913
- Place of birth: Birmingham, England
- Position: Forward

Senior career*
Years	Team	Apps	(Gls)
- Bromsgrove Rovers
- Halesowen Town
1936–1944	Birmingham	10	(3)
- * Club domestic league appearances and goals

Kenneth Kendrick (May 1913 – after 1943) is an English former professional footballer who made 10 appearances in the Football League playing for Birmingham. He played as a forward.

Kendrick was born in the Bartley Green district of Birmingham. He began his football career with Bromsgrove Rovers and Halesowen Town before joining Football League First Division club Birmingham, where his father Billy had been trainer for some years, in 1936. He made his debut on 23 January 1937 in a 2–1 defeat at home to Charlton Athletic. He played infrequently over the next couple of seasons and retired due to injury in 1944.
