= Ray Shaw (English footballer) =

English footballer (1913–1980)

Personal information
- Full name: Raymond Shaw
- Date of birth: 18 May 1913
- Place of birth: Walsall, England
- Date of death: 29 April 1980 (aged 66)
- Place of death: Leicestershire, England
- Height: 5 ft 10 in (1.78 m)
- Positions: Inside forward; wing half

Youth career
- Walsall

Senior career*
Years	Team	Apps	(Gls)
- Walsall
- Streetly Works
193?–1937	Darlaston		
1937–1947	Birmingham	12	(0)

Managerial career
- 1964–1968: Walsall
- * Club domestic league appearances and goals

Raymond Shaw (18 May 1913 – 29 April 1980) was an English professional footballer and manager who played in the Football League for Birmingham and managed Walsall.

== Life and career ==
Shaw was born in 1913 in Walsall, Staffordshire. He began his football career as an amateur with Walsall F.C. in 1928, and played local football for Streetly Works and then for Darlaston, where he was top scorer in the 1936–37 season before turning professional with Birmingham in 1937.

An inside forward while with Darlaston, Shaw made his debut in the First Division on 25 September 1937 playing at centre forward in a 2–1 defeat at Preston North End. He played only occasionally over the next two seasons, mainly at left half, but was first choice in that position at the start of the 1939–40 season which was abandoned on the outbreak of the Second World War. Shaw made 111 appearances for the club in the wartime leagues, and a few more when the Football League resumed in 1946, by which time the club had been renamed Birmingham City.

After retiring as a player, Shaw joined Birmingham's coaching staff. He acted as trainer, coach and trainer-coach until March 1958, when he was appointed as Aston Villa's trainer. He left Villa in July 1964, and succeeded Alf Wood as manager of Walsall in October, stabilising the club in mid-table in the Third Division and twice leading them to the Fourth Round of the FA Cup. After three and a half years, he handed over the team management role to Dick Graham.

Shaw continued as Walsall's general manager until August 1968 when he was appointed chief scout with Leicester City. He held that post until his death in April 1980 at the age of 66.
