= Charlie Craven =

English footballer

Personal information
- Date of birth: 2 December 1909
- Place of birth: Boston, England
- Date of death: 30 March 1972 (aged 62)
- Place of death: Solihull, England
- Height: 5 ft 8 in (1.73 m)
- Position: Inside left

Youth career
- Boston Trinity

Senior career*
Years	Team	Apps	(Gls)
- Boston Town
1930–1938	Grimsby Town	256	(95)
1938	Manchester United	11	(2)
1938–1939	Birmingham	17	(2)
1939–1951	Tamworth		
1951–19??	Sutton Town		
- * Club domestic league appearances and goals

Charlie Craven (2 December 1909 – 30 March 1972) was an English footballer who played as an inside left.

Born in Boston, Lincolnshire, Craven started his football career with local teams before joining Grimsby Town, with whom he won the Second Division in 1934. He went on to score 99 goals in 283 appearances in the top two divisions of the Football League for Grimsby, Manchester United, who paid £6,000 for his services in June 1938, and Birmingham, whom he joined only six months later. He was named as reserve for England for the match against Holland in 1935. He moved into non-League football with Tamworth shortly before the Second World War started, guested for Coventry City and Birmingham during the war, and left Tamworth for Sutton Town in 1951. He died in Solihull, Warwickshire at the age of 62.

== Honours ==
Grimsby Town

- Second Division: 1933–34
