= Harry Parr (footballer, born 1914) =

English footballer

Personal information
- Full name: Harry Cecil Parr
- Date of birth: 1914
- Place of birth: Newcastle upon Tyne, England
- Position: Right half

Senior career*
Years	Team	Apps	(Gls)
- Dawley Rovers
- Wrockwardine Wood
- Donnington Wood
- Sankey's
- Wellington Town
1937–1939	Birmingham	1	(0)
1939	Dawley Rovers		
1939–1940	Stafford Rangers		
- * Club domestic league appearances and goals

Harry Cecil Parr (1914 – after 1939) was an English professional footballer who played in the Football League for Birmingham as a right half.

Parr was born in Newcastle upon Tyne. He played local football in the Shropshire area before joining Birmingham in October 1937. He played only once for the first team, on 23 April 1938 in a 3–0 home defeat to Everton in the First Division. When the Football League was suspended at the start of the Second World War, Parr returned to junior competition.
