= Harry Parr (footballer, born 1915) =

English footballer

Personal information
- Full name: Henry Edward Parr
- Date of birth: 23 October 1915
- Place of birth: Newark, England
- Date of death: 2004 (aged 88–89) (Note: According to the Lincoln City FC Archive, Parr died in 2004, but Neil Brown lists his death year as 1988.)
- Position: Inside forward

Senior career*
Years	Team	Apps	(Gls)
- Ransome & Marles
1945–1946	Clapton Orient	0	(0)
1946–1951	Lincoln City	112	(13)

International career
- England Amateur
- * Club domestic league appearances and goals

Henry Edward Parr (23 October 1915 – 2004) was an English footballer who made 112 appearances in the Football League playing for Lincoln City just after the Second World War. He played as an inside forward. Parr was capped for the England amateur team.

== Life and career ==
Parr was born in Newark, Nottinghamshire. He was the nephew of England international footballer Willie Hall.

While a player for Newark-based team Ransome & Marles, Parr was selected for The Rest to oppose the England Amateur eleven in an international trial in January 1939. Later that month he travelled as reserve for the amateur international against Ireland in Belfast. He played for Clapton Orient in the 1945–46 season in the Football League South and in that season's FA Cup competition.

Parr joined Third Division North club Lincoln City – he worked in Lincoln for the Post Office – and made his debut in the opening match of the first post-war Football League season. He missed only three games that season, and in February was selected for the amateur international against Northern Ireland at Southport, replacing the injured Maurice Edelston. The Daily Express's Robert Findlay likened his style to that of Scotland international inside forward Tommy Walker, "superb ball control, quietly effective, a good tactician", and suggested that "professional clubs have been offering the moon and stars for his signature". He was ever-present the next season as Lincoln won the Third Division title and promotion to the Second. Parr played in around half Lincoln's matches in the Second Division as they were relegated after only one season at the higher level, and appeared just six times more for the club's first team.
