= Dai Richards =

Welsh footballer

Personal information
- Full name: David Thomas Richards
- Date of birth: 31 October 1906
- Place of birth: Abercanaid, Wales
- Date of death: 1 October 1969 (aged 62)
- Place of death: Yardley, England
- Height: 5 ft 8 in (1.73 m)
- Position: Left half

Senior career*
Years	Team	Apps	(Gls)
1924–1925	Riverfield		
1925–1926	Bedlinog		
1926–1927	Merthyr Town	0	(0)
1927–1935	Wolverhampton Wanderers	219	(5)
1935–1937	Brentford	55	(0)
1937–1939	Birmingham	62	(2)
1939–1945	Walsall	3	(0)
1945–19??	Sedgley		

International career
1931–1938	Wales	21	(0)
- * Club domestic league appearances and goals

David Thomas Richards (31 October 1906 – 1 October 1969) was a Welsh professional footballer who made over 210 appearances as a left half in the Football League for Wolverhampton Wanderers. He also played league football for Birmingham and Brentford and won 21 caps for Wales. He is one of only two players to have been on the winning side against England for Wales four times (goalkeeper Bert Gray is the other). Richards appeared in the victories in 1933, both victories in 1936 and in 1938.

== Personal life ==
Richards' brother Billy also played in the Football League and was capped by Wales. Richards died in Yardley, Birmingham in 1969, at age 62.

== Career statistics ==
Appearances and goals by club, season and competition
Club	Season	League			FA Cup		Total	
Club	Season	Division	Apps	Goals	Apps	Goals	Apps	Goals
Wolverhampton Wanderers	1927–28	Second Division	3	0	0	0	3	0
Wolverhampton Wanderers	1928–29	Second Division	13	0	0	0	13	0
Wolverhampton Wanderers	1929–30	Second Division	28	1	0	0	28	1
Wolverhampton Wanderers	1930–31	Second Division	30	0	3	0	33	0
Wolverhampton Wanderers	1931–32	Second Division	33	1	2	0	35	1
Wolverhampton Wanderers	1932–33	First Division	36	1	1	0	37	1
Wolverhampton Wanderers	1933–34	First Division	36	1	2	0	38	1
Wolverhampton Wanderers	1934–35	First Division	32	1	2	0	34	1
Wolverhampton Wanderers	1935–36	First Division	8	0	—		8	0
Wolverhampton Wanderers	Total		219	5	10	0	229	5
Brentford	1935–36	First Division	26	0	1	0	27	0
Brentford	1936–37	First Division	29	0	2	0	31	0
Brentford	Total		55	0	3	0	58	0
Birmingham	1936–37	First Division	8	1	—		8	1
Birmingham	1937–38	First Division	35	1	1	0	36	1
Birmingham	1938–39	First Division	19	0	3	0	22	0
Birmingham	Total		62	2	4	0	66	2
Career total			336	7	17	0	353	7

== Honours ==
Wolverhampton Wanderers

- Football League Second Division: 1931–32
