= Joseph Parr =

Joseph Parr (1790–1868) was a town crier of Derby. Parr was born in 1790 and died in 1868, at the age of 78.

He is believed to have been a descendant of a decayed branch of a local family that had rented space in The Shambles of Chesterfield, which is a collection of narrow and old streets.
