= Wally Halsall =

English footballer

Personal information
- Full name: Walter George Halsall
- Date of birth: 29 March 1912
- Place of birth: Liverpool, England
- Date of death: March 1996 (aged 83–84)
- Place of death: Sefton South, England
- Height: 6 ft 0 in (1.83 m)
- Position: Wing half

Senior career*
Years	Team	Apps	(Gls)
–	Bootle Celtic		
–	Liverpool	0	(0)
–1932	Marine		
1932	Burscough Rangers		
1932	Bolton Wanderers		
1932–1938	Blackburn Rovers	63	(4)
1938–1939	Birmingham	21	(0)
1939–1946	Chesterfield	0	(0)
- * Club domestic league appearances and goals

Walter George Halsall (29 March 1912 – March 1996) was an English professional footballer who made 84 appearances in the First Division of the Football League playing for Blackburn Rovers and Birmingham.

== Life and career ==
Halsall was born in Liverpool. As a young man he played as an amateur for various clubs in the Lancashire area. In the 1931–32 season, Marine reached the final of the FA Amateur Cup, the first time the club had progressed further than the last eight. Halsall scored the winning goal in the semi-final to defeat Yorkshire Amateurs, and played in the final, which Marine lost 7–1 to Dulwich Hamlet.

In December 1932 he signed for Blackburn Rovers, initially as an amateur, turning professional a few months later. He gained a reputation for an elegant style of play, but when the club signed Charlie Calladine from Birmingham in 1936, the two players were in competition for the same position, and Halsall's appearances became less frequent. He was released after the 1937–38 season and joined Birmingham, where the local press described him as a "tall, stylish player with the heart to do two men's work". After one season Birmingham were relegated from the First Division, and Halsall joined Chesterfield for a fee of £875, but never played a league game for them before the Football League was suspended in September 1939.

Halsall retired from football during the Second World War and became a commercial traveller. He died in Sefton South in March 1996.
