= Ted Duckhouse =

English footballer

Personal information
- Full name: Edward Duckhouse
- Date of birth: 9 April 1918
- Place of birth: Shelfield, Staffordshire, England
- Date of death: 1978 (aged 59–60)
- Place of death: Walsall, Staffordshire, England
- Position: Defender

Senior career*
Years	Team	Apps	(Gls)
- Walsall Wood
–	Cannock Chase Colliery		
–	Streetly Works		
1937–1938	West Bromwich Albion	0	(0)
1938–1950	Birmingham City	119	(4)
1950–1952	Northampton Town	68	(0)
1952–1955	Rushden Town		
- * Club domestic league appearances and goals

Edward Duckhouse (9 April 1918 – 1978) was an English professional footballer who played as a defender. He made over 100 appearances in the top two divisions of the Football League for Birmingham City, playing his part in the Second Division championship-winning side of 1948, and also played for Northampton Town.

Duckhouse was born in Shelfield, near Walsall in Staffordshire. He began his football career with works teams before joining West Bromwich Albion and then Birmingham as an amateur. He turned professional with Birmingham in 1938. His career was badly disrupted by the Second World War, but he did help Birmingham to reach the semifinal of the first post-war FA Cup, in which they played Derby County. The tie went to a replay, and remained goalless after 90 minutes; after five minutes of extra time, Duckhouse broke his leg colliding with Peter Doherty in a vain attempt to stop him scoring the opening goal. In those days there were no substitutes, so Birmingham had to play the remainder of the match with ten men; they lost 4–0. Duckhouse died in Walsall in 1978 aged about 60.

== Honours ==
- Birmingham City
  - Football League South war league champions 1946
  - Second Division champions 1947–48
