= James Bye (footballer) =

English footballer (1920–1995)

Personal information
- Full name: James Henry Bye
- Date of birth: 11 February 1920
- Place of birth: Aston, Birmingham, England
- Date of death: June 1995 (aged 75)
- Place of death: Blackpool, England
- Height: 5 ft 9 in (1.75 m)
- Position: Right half

Youth career
- 193?–1934: Bournbrook Alliance
- 1934–1937: Birmingham
- 193?–1936: Shirley Juniors

Senior career*
Years	Team	Apps	(Gls)
1937–1944	Birmingham	1	(0)
- * Club domestic league appearances and goals

James Henry Bye (11 February 1920 – June 1995) was an English professional footballer who played in the Football League for Birmingham. He played as a right half.

== Life and career ==
Bye was born in 1920 in the Aston district of Birmingham, the son of Arthur Bye and his wife Lillian née Featherstone, and attended St Peter's School in Harborne. He played youth football for Bournbrook Alliance, from where he signed amateur forms with Birmingham as a 14-year-old. He played for Shirley Juniors, a team "fostered" by Birmingham's vice-chairman, David Wiseman, before turning professional with Birmingham "immediately on reaching 17". He played for the youth team and for the Central League side before making his senior debut in the FA Cup third-round tie against Halifax Town on 7 January 1939, standing in at right half for the injured Don Dearson. Birmingham won 2–0. He made his first appearance in the First Division three weeks later, in a 5–0 defeat away to Preston North End, and played in the first three games of the 1939–40 Football League season, which was then abandoned when the Second World War started.

Bye was called up in January 1940. While not required by the Army, he played 36 games for Birmingham in the wartime competitions, and also made guest appearances for Nottingham Forest and West Bromwich Albion, before retiring from the game in 1944.

At the start of the war, Bye was living with his parents in Vivian Road, Harborne, and working in a tobacconist's shop. He married Margaret Moore in 1955. Bye's death was registered in June 1995 in the Blackpool and Fylde district.

== Sources ==
- Matthews, Tony (1995). Birmingham City: A Complete Record. Derby: Breedon Books. ISBN 978-1-85983-010-9.
