= Tom Farrage (footballer) =

English footballer (1917–1944)

Personal information
- Full name: Thomas Oysten Farrage
- Date of birth: 3 November 1917
- Place of birth: Chopwell, County Durham, England
- Date of death: 23 September 1944 (aged 26)
- Place of death: Arnhem, German-occupied Netherlands
- Position: Outside left

Senior career*
| Years | Team | Apps | (Gls) |
- Walker Celtic
| 1937–1944 | Birmingham (Note: Figures include three games and one goal from the abandoned 1939–40 season.) | 10 | (3) |
Military career
| Allegiance | United Kingdom |
| Branch | British Army |
| Service years | –1944 |
| Rank | Private |
| Service number | 138613 |
| Units | 10th Battalion, Parachute Regiment |
| Conflicts | Second World War: Operation Market Garden; Battle of Arnhem † |
- * Club domestic league appearances and goals

Thomas Oysten Farrage (3 November 1917 – 23 September 1944) was an English professional footballer who played in the Football League for Birmingham. He was killed in action during the Second World War.

== Life and career ==
Farrage was born in Chopwell, near Rowlands Gill, which was then in County Durham, to Robert and Isabella Farrage. He began his football career with Walker Celtic in the North Eastern League, and joined First Division club Birmingham in November 1937. Described as a "promising young player with an eye for goal", Farrage made his debut on 7 September 1938 in a 2–1 win at home to Leicester City, and kept his place for five of the next six games, in which he scored twice. He played once more that season, and in the opening three games of the 1939–40 season which was abandoned because of the Second World War.

He made guest appearances for Leeds United, Luton Town and Middlesbrough in the wartime leagues, though he did not play again for Birmingham.

Farrage was a member of the Royal Army Service Corps (RASC) (his last station was at Dover) until May 1943, when he commenced training with the Parachute Regiment. He was killed in action on 23 September 1944 by German machine-gun fire in Arnhem (see the Battle of Arnhem), serving as a private in the 10th Battalion, Parachute Regiment during Operation Market Garden, and is commemorated on the Groesbeek Memorial.
