= 1930–31 Birmingham F.C. season =

Birmingham F.C.
1930–31 season
- Chairman: Howard Cant
- Manager: Leslie Knighton
- Ground: St Andrew's
- Football League First Division: 19th
- FA Cup: Runner-up (eliminated by West Bromwich Albion)
- Top goalscorer: League: George Briggs (15); All: Joe Bradford (22)
- Highest home attendance: 55,298 vs Chelsea, FA Cup 6th round, 28 February 1931
- Lowest home attendance: 6,535 vs Portsmouth, 28 January 1931
- Average home league attendance: 18,175
Home colours

The 1930–31 Football League season was Birmingham Football Club's 35th in the Football League and their 18th in the First Division. They finished in 19th position in the 22-team division, five points clear of the relegation places. They also competed in the 1930–31 FA Cup, entering at the third round proper and reaching the final for the first time in the club's history. They lost 2–1 to Second Division club West Bromwich Albion.

Twenty-seven players made at least one appearance in nationally organised competition, and there were eleven different goalscorers. Forward Ernie Curtis played in 47 of the 49 matches over the season, and, for the 10th successive year, Joe Bradford was leading scorer, with 22 goals in all competitions, of which 14 came in the league. George Briggs scored more league goals, with 15.

The 9–1 defeat away to Sheffield Wednesday on 13 December equalled the club record for widest margin of defeat.

== Football League First Division ==
Date	League position	Opponents	Venue	Result	Score F–A	Scorers	Attendance
30 August 1930	4th	Sheffield United	H	W	3–1	Morrall, Briggs, Bradford	20,641
1 September 1930	7th	Leicester City	A	L	1–2	Briggs	14,391
6 September 1930	8th	Derby County	A	D	0–0		15,681
10 September 1930	10th	Newcastle United	H	D	1–1	Bradford	13,893
13 September 1930	6th	Manchester City	H	W	3–2	Briggs 2, Bradford	11,148
17 September 1930	6th	Newcastle United	A	D	2–2	Briggs, Morrall	19,902
20 September 1930	8th	Portsmouth	A	D	2–2	Hicks, Briggs	16,002
27 September 1930	11th	Arsenal	H	L	2–4	Briggs, Roberts og	31,693
4 October 1930	14th	Blackburn Rovers	A	L	1–2	Horsman	14,728
11 October 1930	15th	Blackpool	H	D	1–1	Curtis	23,453
18 October 1930	13th	Aston Villa	A	D	1–1	Briggs	55,482
25 October 1930	12th	Chelsea	H	W	6–2	Bradford 2, Curtis, Briggs 2, Crosbie	17,277
1 November 1930	12th	Manchester United	A	L	0–2		11,479
8 November 1930	15th	West Ham United	A	L	0–2		20,171
15 November 1930	13th	Middlesbrough	A	D	1–1	Curtis	11,883
22 November 1930	12th	Grimsby Town	H	W	4–1	Fillingham, Firth 3	13,637
29 November 1930	15th	Bolton Wanderers	A	L	0–2		15,361
6 December 1930	13th	Huddersfield Town	H	W	2–0	Bradford, Curtis	16,036
13 December 1930	15th	Sheffield Wednesday	A	L	1–9	Briggs	21,226
20 December 1930	15th	Liverpool	H	W	2–0	Briggs 2	16,165
25 December 1930	15th	Leeds United	H	L	0–1		24,991
26 December 1930	16th	Leeds United	A	L	1–3	Curtis	12,381
27 December 1930	18th	Sheffield United	A	L	1–2	Cringan	24,208
3 January 1931	19th	Derby County	H	L	1–2	Curtis	14,555
17 January 1931	19th	Manchester City	A	L	2–4	Briggs, Gregg	19,918
28 January 1931	19th	Portsmouth	H	W	2–1	Briggs, Bradford	6,535
31 January 1931	17th	Arsenal	A	D	1–1	Bradford	30,913
7 February 1931	17th	Blackburn Rovers	H	W	4–1	Bradford 4	23,642
18 February 1931	17th	Blackpool	A	W	1–0	Crosbie	10,136
21 February 1931	18th	Aston Villa	H	L	0–4		49,619
7 March 1931	18th	Manchester United	H	D	0–0		17,678
16 March 1931	17th	West Ham United	A	W	2–1	Firth, Bradford	8,521
21 March 1931	17th	Middlesbrough	H	L	1–2	Jarvis og	20,311
25 March 1931	18th	Chelsea	A	L	0–1		12,968
28 March 1931	18th	Grimsby Town	A	L	1–4	Fillingham	10,994
3 April 1931	20th	Sunderland	A	L	0–1		18,180
4 April 1931	20th	Bolton Wanderers	H	L	0–2		18,083
6 April 1931	19th	Sunderland	H	W	1–0	Gregg	11,207
11 April 1931	19th	Huddersfield Town	A	L	0–1		10,920
15 April 1931	19th	Liverpool	A	D	0–0		6,045
18 April 1931	19th	Sheffield Wednesday	H	W	2–0	Gregg, Curtis	16,411
2 May 1931	19th	Leicester City	H	W	2–1	Curtis, Bradford	14,704

=== League table (part) ===
Final First Division table (part)
Pos	Club	Pld	W	D	L	F	A	GA	Pts
17th	Newcastle United	42	15	6	21	78	87	0.90	36
18th	West Ham United	42	14	8	20	79	94	0.84	36
19th	Birmingham	42	13	10	19	55	70	0.79	36
20th	Blackpool	42	11	10	21	71	125	0.57	32
21st	Leeds United	42	12	7	23	68	81	0.84	31
Key	Pos = League position; Pld = Matches played; W = Matches won; D = Matches drawn; L = Matches lost; F = Goals for; A = Goals against; GA = Goal average; Pts = Points								
Source									

== FA Cup ==
Birmingham "won finely" at Anfield to defeat Liverpool 2–0, then eliminated Port Vale and, with Ernie Curtis "in magnificent form", Watford, to reach the sixth round in which they played Chelsea. Playing in a blizzard at St Andrew's, Chelsea took the lead and had a second goal disallowed before the change of ends brought a change of fortunes. George Briggs crossed for Joe Bradford's header, then Briggs and Bradford combined for Curtis to put Birmingham ahead. With ten minutes left, a misplaced clearance by Bob Gregg allowed Jackie Crawford to equalise. The replay at Stamford Bridge, before a ground-record crowd of 74,365 with thousands more locked out, remained goalless until Chelsea half-backs John Townrow and Sid Bishop were injured. With no substitutes permitted, Birmingham took advantage, winning the tie 3–0 with goals from Jack Firth and two from Bradford. Curtis opened the scoring half an hour into the semi-final against First Division Sunderland. Sunderland's players thought they should have had a penalty, they failed to take numerous chances, and Harry Hibbs made some fine saves, but three minutes from time, Curtis had a shot blocked, Bradford "rushed in to help his colleague and between them they scored the second goal".

After six minutes of the final, Bob Gregg's header from Jimmy Cringan's free kick was ruled offside; newspaper reports suggest the decision was incorrect. After 24 minutes, Ned Barkas deflected W. G. Richardson's shot away from Hibbs and Richardson steered it home. Chances were missed by both sides before Joe Bradford equalised with a 25-yard (23 m) shot. But straight from the restart, Albion ran the ball down the field, George Liddell sliced his clearance to Richardson's feet, and the forward scored from close range.

Round	Date	Opponents	Venue	Result	Score F–A	Scorers	Attendance
Third round	10 January 1931	Liverpool	A	W	2–0	Curtis, Bradford	40,500
Fourth round	24 January 1931	Port Vale	H	W	2–0	Bradford 2	44,119
Fifth round	14 February 1931	Watford	H	W	3–0	Bradford, Curtis 2	49,757
Sixth round	28 February 1931	Chelsea	H	D	2–2	Bradford, Curtis	55,298
Sixth round replay	4 March 1931	Chelsea	A	W	3–0	Firth, Bradford 2	74,365
Semi-final	14 March 1931	Sunderland	Elland Road, Leeds	W	2–0	Curtis 2	43,570
Final	25 April 1931	West Bromwich Albion	Wembley Stadium	L	1–2	Bradford	90,368

== Appearances and goals ==
This table includes appearances and goals in nationally organised competitive matches – the Football League and FA Cup – only.
For a description of the playing positions, see Formation (association football)#2–3–5 (Pyramid).

Players' appearances and goals by competition
Name	Position	League		FA Cup		Total	
Name	Position	Apps	Goals	Apps	Goals	Apps	Goals
Harry Hibbs	Goalkeeper	36	0	7	0	43	0
Ken Tewkesbury	Goalkeeper	1	0	0	0	1	0
Dan Tremelling	Goalkeeper	5	0	0	0	5	0
Ned Barkas	Full back	33	0	7	0	40	0
Harold Booton	Full back	10	0	0	0	10	0
George Liddell	Full back	29	0	7	0	36	0
Jack Randle	Full back	13	0	0	0	13	0
Charlie Calladine	Half back	1	0	0	0	1	0
Jimmy Cringan	Half back	34	1	7	0	41	1
Tom Fillingham	Half back	21	2	0	0	21	2
Jack Firth	Half back	25	4	2	1	27	5
Alec Leslie	Half back	24	0	7	0	31	0
George Morrall	Half back	31	2	7	0	38	2
Lewis Stoker	Half back	7	0	0	0	7	0
Billy Blyth	Forward	2	0	0	0	2	0
Benny Bond	Forward	3	0	0	0	3	0
Joe Bradford	Forward	22	14	7	8	29	22
George Briggs	Forward	32	15	6	0	38	15
Johnny Crosbie	Forward	31	2	7	0	38	2
Ernie Curtis	Forward	40	8	7	6	47	14
Bob Gregg	Forward	15	3	4	0	19	3
George Haywood	Forward	4	0	0	0	4	0
George Hicks	Forward	7	1	0	0	7	1
Bill Horsman	Forward	25	1	2	0	27	1
Harry Lane	Forward	2	0	0	0	2	0
Jack Morfitt	Forward	1	0	0	0	1	0
Tommy Robinson	Forward	1	0	0	0	1	0
Jack Thorogood	Forward	7	0	0	0	7	0

== See also ==
- Birmingham City F.C. seasons
