= 1929–30 Birmingham F.C. season =

Birmingham F.C.
1929–30 season
- Chairman: Howard Cant
- Manager: Leslie Knighton
- Ground: St Andrew's
- Football League First Division: 11th
- FA Cup: Fourth round (eliminated by Arsenal)
- Top goalscorer: League: Joe Bradford (23); All: Joe Bradford (23)
- Highest home attendance: 47,521 vs Arsenal, FA Cup 4th round replay, 29 January 1930
- Lowest home attendance: 10,901 vs Liverpool, 15 February 1930
- Average home league attendance: 20,397
Home colours

The 1929–30 Football League season was Birmingham Football Club's 34th in the Football League and their 17th in the First Division. They finished in 11th position in the 22-team division. They also competed in the 1929–30 FA Cup, entering at the third round proper and losing to Arsenal in the fourth after a replay.

Twenty-five players made at least one appearance in nationally organised competition, and there were thirteen different goalscorers. Forwards Johnny Crosbie and George Hicks played in 42 of the 45 matches over the season, and Joe Bradford was leading scorer for the ninth successive year, with 23 goals, all scored in the league.

Off the field, the Yorkshire Post reported that "The annual statement of accounts of the Birmingham F.C. shows a profit on last season's working of £1,412, a pleasant change from the previous season, when the club declared a loss of nearly £7,300. Gross receipts show a considerable increase, totalling nearly £40,000, the attendances being better throughout the season."

== Football League First Division ==
Date	League position	Opponents	Venue	Result	Score F–A	Scorers	Attendance
31 August 1929	17th	Aston Villa	A	L	1–2	Bradford	36,834
4 September 1929	9th	West Ham United	A	W	4–2	Bradford 3, Barkas	13,301
7 September 1929	7th	Huddersfield Town	H	W	4–1	Bradford 2, Curtis, Liddell	24,830
14 September 1929	12th	Sheffield United	A	L	2–4	Curtis, Barkas pen	16,528
16 September 1929	5th	West Ham United	H	W	1–0	Bradford	13,265
21 September 1929	4th	Newcastle United	H	W	5–1	Bradford 3, Curtis, Crosbie	25,707
28 September 1929	9th	Blackburn Rovers	A	L	5–7	Bradford 3, Crosbie 2	18,942
5 October 1929	8th	Middlesbrough	H	D	1–1	Bradford	23,140
12 October 1929	11th	Liverpool	A	D	1–1	Curtis	35,859
17 October 1929	11th	Leicester City	A	L	1–2	Curtis	13,352
19 October 1929	13th	Leeds United	A	L	0–1		20,067
26 October 1929	10th	Sheffield Wednesday	H	W	1–0	Hicks	27,221
2 November 1929	12th	Burnley	A	L	1–3	Crosbie	11,068
9 November 1929	16th	Arsenal	H	L	2–3	Bradford, Crosbie	33,904
16 November 1929	15th	Bolton Wanderers	A	D	0–0		15,922
23 November 1929	15th	Everton	H	D	0–0		13,883
30 November 1929	17th	Derby County	A	L	1–3	Curtis	13,516
7 December 1929	14th	Manchester City	H	W	3–0	Curtis, Haywood	15,948
14 December 1929	17th	Portsmouth	A	L	1–2	Barkas pen	17,978
21 December 1929	14th	Sunderland	H	W	3–0	Hicks, Haywood, Briggs	16,327
25 December 1929	15th	Manchester United	A	D	0–0		18,626
26 December 1929	16th	Manchester United	H	L	0–1		35,682
28 December 1929	17th	Aston Villa	H	D	1–1	Crosbie	33,228
4 January 1930	17th	Huddersfield Town	A	D	1–1	Hicks	14,596
18 January 1930	14th	Sheffield United	H	W	2–1	Curtis, Bradford	23,471
1 February 1930	17th	Blackburn Rovers	H	L	1–2	Bradford	18,521
8 February 1930	18th	Middlesbrough	A	L	1–5	Haywood	16,969
15 February 1930	18th	Liverpool	H	W	1–0	Haywood	10,901
22 February 1930	17th	Leeds United	H	W	1–0	Haywood	17,703
8 March 1930	15th	Burnley	H	W	2–0	Bradford, Cringan	19,485
15 March 1930	18th	Arsenal	A	L	0–1		32,174
22 March 1930	14th	Bolton Wanderers	H	W	3–1	Blyth 2, Bradford	18,262
29 March 1930	13th	Everton	A	W	4–2	Crosbie, Bradford, Blyth, Briggs	28,549
2 April 1930	12th	Newcastle United	A	D	1–1	Morrall	18,113
5 April 1930	13th	Derby County	H	L	2–4	Briggs, Robinson	13,609
12 April 1930	13th	Manchester City	A	W	4–1	Fillingham, Hicks, Briggs	25,737
18 April 1930	13th	Grimsby Town	A	L	1–2	Morrall	19,884
19 April 1930	13th	Portsmouth	H	W	1–0	Fillingham	11,967
22 April 1930	14th	Grimsby Town	H	L	0–2		18,482
26 April 1930	15th	Sunderland	A	L	0–2		15,486
28 April 1930	14th	Sheffield Wednesday	A	D	1–1	Blyth	9,310
3 May 1930	11th	Leicester City	H	W	3–0	Bradford 3	12,795

=== League table (part) ===
Final First Division table (part)
Pos	Club	Pld	W	D	L	F	A	GA	Pts
9th	Sunderland	42	18	7	17	78	87	0.95	43
10th	Bolton Wanderers	42	17	9	16	63	69	0.91	43
11th	Birmingham	42	16	9	17	67	62	1.08	41
12th	Liverpool	42	16	9	17	63	79	0.80	41
13th	Portsmouth	42	15	10	17	66	62	1.06	40
Key	Pos = League position; Pld = Matches played; W = Matches won; D = Matches drawn; L = Matches lost; F = Goals for; A = Goals against; GA = Goal average; Pts = Points								
Source									

== FA Cup ==
Round	Date	Opponents	Venue	Result	Score F–A	Scorers	Attendance
Third round	11 January 1930	Bolton Wanderers	H	W	1–0	Morrall	36,011
Fourth round	25 January 1930	Arsenal	A	W	2–2	Briggs 2	43,274
Fourth round replay	29 January 1930	Arsenal	H	L	0–1		47,521

== Appearances and goals ==
This table includes appearances and goals in nationally organised competitive matches – the Football League and FA Cup – only.
For a description of the playing positions, see Formation (association football)#2–3–5 (Pyramid).
Players marked † left the club during the playing season.

Players' appearances and goals by competition
Name	Position	League		FA Cup		Total	
Name	Position	Apps	Goals	Apps	Goals	Apps	Goals
Harry Hibbs	Goalkeeper	33	0	3	0	36	0
Ken Tewkesbury	Goalkeeper	2	0	0	0	2	0
Dan Tremelling	Goalkeeper	7	0	0	0	7	0
Ned Barkas	Full back	38	3	3	0	41	3
Harold Booton	Full back	4	0	0	0	4	0
George Liddell	Full back	28	1	3	0	31	1
Jack Randle	Full back	18	0	0	0	18	0
Billy Blyth	Half back	19	4	0	0	19	4
Jack Coxford	Half back	1	0	0	0	1	0
Jimmy Cringan	Half back	15	1	3	0	18	1
Jack Firth	Half back	36	0	3	0	39	0
Alec Leslie	Half back	18	0	9	0	18	0
George Morrall	Half back	37	2	3	1	40	3
Alfred Sabin	Half back	2	0	0	0	2	0
Benny Bond	Forward	14	0	0	0	14	0
Joe Bradford	Forward	27	23	3	0	30	23
George Briggs	Forward	29	4	3	2	32	6
Johnny Crosbie	Forward	39	7	3	0	42	7
Ernie Curtis	Forward	25	8	3	0	28	8
Tom Fillingham	Forward	4	3	0	0	4	3
George Haywood	Forward	12	6	0	0	12	6
George Hicks	Forward	38	4	3	0	42	4
Bill Horsman	Forward	7	0	0	0	7	0
Paddy Mills †	Forward	2	0	0	0	2	0
Tommy Robinson	Forward	7	1	0	0	7	1

== See also ==
- Birmingham City F.C. seasons
