= 1927–28 Birmingham F.C. season =

Birmingham F.C.
1927–28 season
- Chairman: Howard Cant
- Secretary-manager: Bill Harvey
- Ground: St Andrew's
- Football League First Division: 11th
- FA Cup: Fifth round (eliminated by Manchester United)
- Top goalscorer: League: Joe Bradford (29); All: Joe Bradford (32)
- Highest home attendance: 47,605 vs Aston Villa, 5 November 1927
- Lowest home attendance: 10,030 vs Arsenal, 19 November 1927
- Average home league attendance: 21,218
Home colours

The 1927–28 Football League season was Birmingham Football Club's 32nd in the Football League and their 15th in the First Division. They finished in 11th position in the 22-team division. They also competed in the 1927–28 FA Cup, entering at the third round proper and losing to Manchester United in the fifth. Bill Harvey stood down as manager at the end of the season.

Twenty-seven players made at least one appearance in nationally organised competition, and there were eleven different goalscorers. Half-back Alec Leslie was ever-present over the 45-match season, and Joe Bradford was leading scorer for the seventh successive year, with 32 goals, of which 29 came in the league.

This season saw the last appearance by Frank Womack. He made his Birmingham debut in 1908, and went on to set club appearance records of 491 league games, a record which as of 2012 still stands, and 515 games in senior competition, since overtaken by Gil Merrick. He never scored a senior goal.

== Football League First Division ==
Date	League position	Opponents	Venue	Result	Score F–A	Scorers	Attendance
27 August 1927	19th	Tottenham Hotspur	A	L	0–1		37,408
29 August 1927	9th	Huddersfield Town	H	W	3–1	Bradford 2, Harris	16,432
3 September 1927	11th	Manchester United	H	D	0–0		25,863
7 September 1927	15th	Sunderland	A	L	2–4	Bond, Bradford	23,007
10 September 1927	18th	Everton	A	L	2–5	Bradford, Briggs	37,386
17 September 1927	21st	Cardiff City	H	L	1–3	Bond	23,723
24 September 1927	22nd	Blackburn Rovers	A	D	4–4	Bradford 4	15,331
1 October 1927	21st	Bolton Wanderers	H	D	1–1	Harris	15,998
8 October 1927	17th	Sheffield Wednesday	A	W	3–2	Briggs 2, Bradford	19,974
15 October 1927	12th	Middlesbrough	H	W	3–2	Bradford, Bloxham, Briggs	17,143
22 October 1927	14th	Bury	H	D	2–2	Harris, Bradford	11,925
29 October 1927	19th	Sheffield United	A	L	1–3	Bond	17,128
5 November 1927	17th	Aston Villa	H	D	1–1	Crosbie	47,605
12 November 1927	18th	Burnley	A	L	1–2	Bradford	14,648
19 November 1927	18th	Arsenal	H	D	1–1	Crosbie	10,030
26 November 1927	18th	Portsmouth	A	D	2–2	Crosbie 2	18,549
3 December 1927	19th	Leicester City	H	L	0–2		24,272
10 December 1927	18th	Liverpool	A	W	3–2	Davies, Briggs 2	24,255
17 December 1927	19th	West Ham United	H	L	1–2	Bradford	18,206
24 December 1927	21st	Derby County	A	L	1–4	Bradford	8,535
26 December 1927	20th	Sunderland	H	D	1–1	Davies	20,120
31 December 1927	20th	Tottenham Hotspur	H	W	3–2	Bradford 2, Briggs	11,603
2 January 1928	20th	Newcastle United	A	D	1–1	Briggs	34,434
7 January 1928	20th	Manchester United	A	D	1–1	Briggs	16,853
21 January 1928	20th	Everton	H	D	2–2	Ellis, Briggs	33,675
4 February 1928	20th	Blackburn Rovers	H	W	2–1	Bradford 2	21,425
11 February 1928	20th	Bolton Wanderers	A	L	2–3	Bradford, Crosbie	11,747
22 February 1928	20th	Cardiff City	A	L	1–2	Briggs	10,758
25 February 1928	20th	Middlesbrough	A	D	1–1	Firth	18,329
3 March 1928	18th	Bury	A	W	3–2	Bradford 2, Briggs	13,164
7 March 1928	17th	Sheffield Wednesday	H	W	1–0	Ellis	12,076
10 March 1928	13th	Sheffield United	H	W	4–1	Briggs 3, Bond	22,860
17 March 1928	15th	Aston Villa	A	D	1–1	Bradford	59,367
24 March 1928	11th	Burnley	H	W	4–0	Bradford 3, Crosbie	23,689
31 March 1928	13th	Arsenal	A	D	2–2	Crosbie, Ellis	13,990
7 April 1928	10th	Portsmouth	H	W	2–0	Bond, Ellis	32,996
9 April 1928	12th	Huddersfield Town	A	L	0–2		28,779
10 April 1928	13th	Newcastle United	H	L	0–2		23,436
14 April 1928	17th	Leicester City	A	L	0–3		17,558
21 April 1928	13th	Liverpool	H	W	2–0	Bradford 2	16,063
28 April 1928	14th	West Ham United	A	D	3–3	Bradford 2, Briggs	17,917
5 May 1928	11th	Derby County	H	W	2–1	Curtis, Carr og	16,430

=== League table (part) ===
Final First Division table (part)
Pos	Club	Pld	W	D	L	F	A	GA	Pts
9th	Newcastle United	42	15	13	14	79	81	0.97	43
10th	Arsenal	42	13	15	14	82	86	0.95	41
11th	Birmingham	42	13	15	14	70	75	0.84	41
12th	Blackburn Rovers	42	16	9	17	66	78	0.85	41
13th	Sheffield United	42	15	10	17	79	86	0.92	40
Key	Pos = League position; Pld = Matches played; W = Matches won; D = Matches drawn; L = Matches lost; F = Goals for; A = Goals against; GA = Goal average; Pts = Points								
Source									

== FA Cup ==
Round	Date	Opponents	Venue	Result	Score F–A	Scorers	Attendance
Third round	14 January 1928	Peterborough & Fletton United	H	W	4–3	Davies, Bradford 3	38,128
Fourth round	28 January 1928	Wrexham	A	W	3–1	Randle pen, Davies 2	12,228
Fifth round	18 February 1928	Manchester United	A	L	0–1		52,568

== Appearances and goals ==
This table includes appearances and goals in nationally organised competitive matches – the Football League and FA Cup – only.
For a description of the playing positions, see Formation (association football)#2–3–5 (Pyramid).
Players marked † left the club during the playing season.

Players' appearances and goals by competition
Name	Position	League		FA Cup		Total	
Name	Position	Apps	Goals	Apps	Goals	Apps	Goals
Harry Hibbs	Goalkeeper	8	0	2	0	10	0
Dan Tremelling	Goalkeeper	34	0	1	0	35	0
Harry Bruce †	Full back	3	0	0	0	3	0
Jack Randle	Full back	29	0	3	1	32	1
Joe Smith	Full back	27	0	2	0	29	0
Ron Stainton	Full back	1	0	0	0	1	0
Frank Womack	Full back	15	0	1	0	16	0
Percy Barton	Half back	16	0	0	0	16	0
Jack Coxford	Half back	8	0	0	0	8	0
Jimmy Cringan	Half back	25	0	3	0	28	0
Dickie Dale	Half back	8	0	0	0	8	0
Alec Leslie	Half back	42	0	3	0	45	0
George Liddell	Half back	25	0	1	0	26	0
George Morrall	Half back	10	0	2	0	12	0
Albert Bloxham †	Forward	3	1	0	0	3	1
Benny Bond	Forward	24	5	1	0	25	5
Joe Bradford	Forward	37	29	3	3	40	32
George Briggs	Forward	40	16	2	0	42	16
Johnny Crosbie	Forward	28	7	3	0	31	7
Ernie Curtis	Forward	11	1	0	0	11	1
Stan Davies	Forward	14	2	3	3	17	5
Billy Ellis	Forward	20	4	3	0	23	4
Jack Firth	Forward	6	1	0	0	6	1
Wally Harris	Forward	11	3	0	0	11	3
Arthur Johnson	Forward	9	0	0	0	9	0
Tot Pike	Forward	3	0	0	0	3	0
Wilf Threlfall	Forward	5	0	0	0	5	0

== See also ==
- Birmingham City F.C. seasons
