= 1931–32 Birmingham F.C. season =

Birmingham F.C.
1931–32 season
- Chairman: Howard Cant
- Manager: Leslie Knighton
- Ground: St Andrew's
- Football League First Division: 9th
- FA Cup: Fourth round (eliminated by Grimsby Town)
- Top goalscorer: League: Joe Bradford (26); All: Joe Bradford (28)
- Highest home attendance: 57,806 vs West Bromwich Albion, 26 December 1931
- Lowest home attendance: 5,829 vs Blackpool, 3 February 1933
- Average home league attendance: 19,627
Home colours

The 1931–32 Football League season was Birmingham Football Club's 36th in the Football League and their 19th in the First Division. They finished in ninth position in the 22-team division. They also competed in the 1931–32 FA Cup, entering at the third round proper and losing to Grimsby Town in the fourth.

Twenty-eight players made at least one appearance in nationally organised competition, and there were eleven different goalscorers. Half-back Lewis Stoker played in 41 of the 44 matches over the season, and, for the 11th successive year, Joe Bradford was leading scorer, with 28 goals, of which 26 came in the league.

== Football League First Division ==
Date	League position	Opponents	Venue	Result	Score F–A	Scorers	Attendance
29 August 1931	14th	Everton	A	L	2–3	Briggs, Curtis	39,146
2 September 1931	8th	Newcastle United	H	W	4–1	Briggs 2, Curtis, Bradford	12,313
5 September 1931	10th	Arsenal	H	D	2–2	Bradford 2 (1 pen)	26,810
12 September 1931	15th	Blackpool	A	D	1–1	Hicks	19,063
16 September 1931	9th	Sunderland	A	W	3–2	Crosbie, Bradford, Briggs	20,376
19 September 1931	12th	Sheffield United	H	L	1–3	Crosbie	22,729
23 September 1931	9th	Sunderland	H	D	0–0		9,761
26 September 1931	10th	Blackburn Rovers	A	W	2–1	Bradford, Jones og	11,004
3 October 1931	7th	Portsmouth	H	W	2–1	Bradford 2	20,743
10 October 1931	9th	Derby County	A	L	1–2	Morrall	12,126
17 October 1931	7th	Grimsby Town	H	W	2–1	Gregg, Bradford	16,313
24 October 1931	10th	Middlesbrough	A	L	0–2		9,226
31 October 1931	11th	Bolton Wanderers	H	D	2–2	Bradford 2	16,163
7 November 1931	13th	Sheffield Wednesday	A	L	1–5	Bradford	12,438
14 November 1931	11th	Leicester City	H	W	2–0	Grosvenor, Bradford	14,225
21 November 1931	13th	Aston Villa	A	L	2–3	Smith 2	44,948
28 November 1931	10th	Huddersfield Town	H	W	5–0	Smith 2, Curtis, Briggs, Bradford	18,059
5 December 1931	11th	Liverpool	A	L	3–4	Briggs, Grosvenor, Smith	19,847
12 December 1931	10th	West Ham United	H	W	4–1	Bradford 2, Curtis 2	19,725
19 December 1931	10th	Chelsea	A	L	1–2	Bradford	17,551
25 December 1931	10th	West Bromwich Albion	A	W	1–0	Curtis	37,906
26 December 1931	9th	West Bromwich Albion	H	W	1–0	Bradford	57,806
2 January 1932	9th	Everton	H	W	4–0	Haywood, Curtis, Bradford	26,256
16 January 1932	10th	Arsenal	A	L	0–3		37,843
30 January 1932	10th	Sheffield United	A	L	0–1		22,459
3 February 1932	10th	Blackpool	H	W	3–0	Curtis, Grosvenor, Bradford	5,829
6 February 1932	9th	Blackburn Rovers	H	W	2–1	Bradford, Curtis	19,506
17 February 1932	9th	Portsmouth	A	L	1–2	Haywood	7,994
20 February 1932	9th	Derby County	H	D	1–1	Curtis	17,397
27 February 1932	9th	Grimsby Town	A	D	1–1	Horsman	9,454
5 March 1932	8th	Middlesbrough	H	W	3–0	Curtis 2 (2 pens), Crosbie	18,694
12 March 1932	8th	Bolton Wanderers	A	L	1–5	Keating	11,003
19 March 1932	11th	Sheffield Wednesday	H	L	1–2	Grosvenor	17,271
26 March 1932	11th	Leicester City	A	L	1–3	Smith	15,582
28 March 1932	12th	Manchester City	A	L	1–2	Briggs	19,804
29 March 1932	12th	Manchester City	H	L	1–5	Bradford	12,603
2 April 1932	12th	Aston Villa	H	D	1–1	Smith	35,671
9 April 1932	12th	Huddersfield Town	A	D	1–1	Briggs	9,563
16 April 1932	10th	Liverpool	H	W	3–1	Bradford, Grosvenor	9,426
23 April 1932	10th	West Ham United	A	W	4–2	Briggs, Curtis, Smith	10,983
30 April 1932	10th	Chelsea	H	W	4–0	Grosvenor, Smith, Briggs, Bradford	14,861
7 May 1932	9th	Newcastle United	A	W	3–0	Bradford, Smith	10,751

=== League table (part) ===
Final First Division table (part)
Pos	Club	Pld	W	D	L	F	A	GA	Pts
7th	Sheffield United	42	20	6	16	80	75	1.07	46
8th	Portsmouth	42	19	7	16	62	62	1.00	45
9th	Birmingham	42	18	8	16	78	67	1.16	44
10th	Liverpool	42	19	6	17	81	93	0.87	44
11th	Newcastle United	42	18	6	18	80	87	0.92	38
Key	Pos = League position; Pld = Matches played; W = Matches won; D = Matches drawn; L = Matches lost; F = Goals for; A = Goals against; GA = Goal average; Pts = Points								
Source									

== FA Cup ==
Round	Date	Opponents	Venue	Result	Score F–A	Scorers	Attendance
3rd	9 January 1932	Bradford City	H	W	1–0	Bradford	37,749
4th	23 January 1932	Grimsby Town	A	L	1–2	Bradford	17,980

== Appearances and goals ==
This table includes appearances and goals in nationally organised competitive matches – the Football League and FA Cup – only.
For a description of the playing positions, see Formation (association football)#2–3–5 (Pyramid).
Players marked † left the club during the playing season.

Players' appearances and goals by competition
Name	Position	League		FA Cup		Total	
Name	Position	Apps	Goals	Apps	Goals	Apps	Goals
Harry Hibbs	Goalkeeper	36	0	2	0	38	0
Jackie Mittell	Goalkeeper	4	0	0	0	4	0
Ken Tewkesbury †	Goalkeeper	2	0	0	0	2	0
Ned Barkas	Full back	19	0	1	0	20	0
Harold Booton	Full back	15	0	1	0	16	0
George Liddell	Full back	37	0	2	0	39	0
Jack Randle	Full back	6	0	0	0	6	0
Jimmy Cringan	Half back	30	0	2	0	32	0
Tom Fillingham	Half back	17	0	0	0	17	0
Jack Firth	Half back	9	0	0	0	9	0
Alec Leslie	Half back	3	0	0	0	3	0
George Morrall	Half back	37	1	2	0	39	1
Lewis Stoker	Half back	39	0	2	0	41	0
Sid Wallington	Half back	2	0	0	0	2	0
Joe Bradford	Forward	37	26	2	2	39	28
George Briggs	Forward	30	11	2	0	32	11
Charlie Calladine	Forward	2	0	0	0	2	0
Johnny Crosbie	Forward	15	3	0	0	15	3
Ernie Curtis	Forward	35	13	2	0	37	13
Bob Gregg	Forward	16	1	0	0	16	1
Tom Grosvenor	Forward	26	6	2	0	28	0
George Haywood	Forward	7	3	0	0	7	3
George Hicks †	Forward	1	1	0	0	1	1
Bill Horsman	Forward	11	1	0	0	11	1
Reg Keating	Forward	5	1	0	0	5	1
Sam Smith	Forward	15	10	2	0	17	10
George Smithies	Forward	1	0	0	0	1	0
Jack Thorogood	Forward	5	0	0	0	5	0

== See also ==
- Birmingham City F.C. seasons
