= 1928–29 Birmingham F.C. season =

Football season

Birmingham F.C.
1928–29 season
- Chairman: Howard Cant
- Manager: Leslie Knighton
- Ground: St Andrew's
- Football League First Division: 15th
- FA Cup: Fourth round (eliminated by Chelsea)
- Top goalscorer: League: Joe Bradford (22); All: Joe Bradford (24)
- Highest home attendance: 36,261 vs Aston Villa, 27 October 1928
- Lowest home attendance: 11,001 vs Arsenal, 13 March 1928
- Average home league attendance: 20,646
Home colours

The 1928–29 Football League season was Birmingham Football Club's 33rd in the Football League and their 16th in the First Division. They finished in 15th position in the 22-team division. They also competed in the 1928–29 FA Cup, entering at the third round proper and losing to Chelsea in the fourth. Bournemouth and Boscombe Athletic manager Leslie Knighton succeeded Bill Harvey at the start of this season.

Twenty-five players made at least one appearance in nationally organised competition, and there were twelve different goalscorers. Full-back Jack Randle played in 43 of the 44 matches over the season, and Joe Bradford was leading scorer for the eighth successive year, with 24 goals, or which 22 came in the league.

Off the field, the Yorkshire Post reported that the club declared a loss of nearly £7,300.

== Football League First Division ==
Date	League position	Opponents	Venue	Result	Score F–A	Scorers	Attendance
25 August 1928	5th	Manchester City	H	W	4–1	Bond, Bradford, Ellis, Briggs	26,911
27 August 1928	11th	Leicester City	A	L	3–5	Briggs, Crosbie, Ellis	22,589
1 September 1928	10th	Huddersfield Town	A	D	0–0		19,897
8 September 1928	15th	Everton	H	L	1–3	Briggs	36,069
10 September 1928	10th	Leicester City	H	W	1–0	Briggs	11,449
15 September 1928	12th	Arsenal	A	D	0–0		30,118
22 September 1928	7th	Blackburn Rovers	H	W	4–0	Bradford 2, Briggs 2	23,047
29 September 1928	4th	Sunderland	A	W	4–3	Bradford 3, Bond	26,986
6 October 1928	8th	Derby County	H	L	1–4	Bond pen	27,029
13 October 1928	12th	Sheffield Wednesday	A	L	0–3		21,677
20 October 1928	15th	Manchester United	A	L	0–1		17,552
27 October 1928	16th	Aston Villa	H	L	2–4	Cringan, Bradford	36,261
3 November 1928	14th	Liverpool	A	W	2–1	Curtis, Bradford	33,647
10 November 1928	15th	West Ham United	H	D	2–2	Bradford, Hicks	17,323
17 November 1928	17th	Newcastle United	A	L	0–1		29,566
24 November 1928	18th	Burnley	H	L	3–6	Briggs, Bradford, Hicks	13,071
1 December 1928	15th	Cardiff City	A	W	4–1	Hicks 2, Firth, Crosbie	13,691
8 December 1928	15th	Sheffield United	H	D	2–2	Bradford 2	17,760
22 December 1928	14th	Leeds United	H	W	5–1	Bradford 3, Liddell, Hicks	16,057
25 December 1928	15th	Bolton Wanderers	H	L	0–2		31,358
26 December 1928	18th	Bolton Wanderers	A	L	2–6	Pike, Bradford	22,117
29 December 1928	15th	Manchester City	A	W	3–2	Pike 2, Bradford	28,365
5 January 1929	17th	Huddersfield Town	H	L	1–2	Barkas pen	20,042
19 January 1929	15th	Everton	A	W	2–0	Hicks 2	26,273
2 February 1929	18th	Blackburn Rovers	A	L	1–4	Ellis	13,387
9 February 1929	18th	Sunderland	H	W	1–0	Pike	17,022
16 February 1929	17th	Derby County	A	D	2–2	Bond, Mills	12,522
23 February 1929	15th	Sheffield Wednesday	H	W	4–1	Bond, Mills, Hicks, Bradford	28,599
2 March 1929	15th	Manchester United	H	D	1–1	Hicks	16,738
9 March 1929	13th	Aston Villa	A	W	2–1	Mills, Crosbie	56,528
13 March 1929	11th	Arsenal	H	D	1–1	Hicks	11,001
16 March 1929	12th	Liverpool	H	D	0–0		20,612
20 March 1929	12th	Bury	A	L	1–3	Bradford	7,296
23 March 1929	12th	West Ham United	A	L	1–2	Firth	15,257
29 March 1929	15th	Portsmouth	A	L	1–3	Ellis	25,136
30 March 1929	15th	Newcastle United	H	D	0–0		21,052
1 April 1929	13th	Portsmouth	H	W	1–0	Bradford	16,266
6 April 1929	16th	Burnley	A	L	0–4		13,730
13 April 1929	14th	Cardiff City	H	D	0–0		12,997
20 April 1929	17th	Sheffield United	A	L	2–3	Hicks 2	14,382
27 April 1929	14th	Bury	H	W	3–2	Crosbie, Bradford 2	12,905
4 May 1929	15th	Leeds United	A	W	1–0	Briggs	8,151

=== League table (part) ===
Final First Division table (part)
Pos	Club	Pld	W	D	L	F	A	GA	Pts
13th	Leeds United	42	16	9	17	71	84	0.84	41
14th	Bolton Wanderers	42	14	12	16	73	78	0.91	40
15th	Birmingham	42	15	10	17	68	77	0.88	40
16th	Huddersfield Town	42	14	11	17	70	61	1.15	39
17th	West Ham United	42	15	9	18	86	96	0.90	39
Key	Pos = League position; Pld = Matches played; W = Matches won; D = Matches drawn; L = Matches lost; F = Goals for; A = Goals against; GA = Goal average; Pts = Points								
Source									

== FA Cup ==
Round	Date	Opponents	Venue	Result	Score F–A	Scorers	Attendance
Third round	12 January 1929	Manchester City	H	W	3–1	Briggs, Bradford 2	25,005
Fourth round	26 January 1929	Chelsea	A	L	0–1		56,953

== Appearances and goals ==
This table includes appearances and goals in nationally organised competitive matches – the Football League and FA Cup – only.
For a description of the playing positions, see Formation (association football)#2–3–5 (Pyramid).
Players marked † left the club during the playing season.

Players' appearances and goals by competition
Name	Position	League		FA Cup		Total	
Name	Position	Apps	Goals	Apps	Goals	Apps	Goals
Harry Hibbs	Goalkeeper	18	0	2	0	20	0
Dan Tremelling	Goalkeeper	24	0	0	0	24	0
Ned Barkas	Full back	18	1	2	0	20	1
Joe Birch	Full back	1	0	0	0	1	0
Jack Randle	Full back	41	0	2	0	43	0
Joe Smith	Full back	4	0	0	0	4	0
Percy Barton	Half back	5	0	0	0	5	0
Jack Coxford	Half back	7	0	0	0	7	0
Jimmy Cringan	Half back	22	1	2	0	24	1
Dickie Dale †	Half back	7	0	0	0	7	0
Alec Leslie	Half back	38	0	1	0	39	0
George Liddell	Half back	40	0	1	0	41	0
George Morrall	Half back	19	0	1	0	20	0
Benny Bond	Forward	22	5	1	0	23	5
Joe Bradford	Forward	32	22	2	2	34	24
George Briggs	Forward	35	8	1	1	36	9
Johnny Crosbie	Forward	38	4	2	0	40	4
Ernie Curtis	Forward	10	1	0	0	10	1
Billy Ellis	Forward	12	4	0	0	12	4
Jack Firth	Forward	12	2	0	0	12	2
George Hicks	Forward	30	12	2	0	32	12
Bill Horsman	Forward	3	0	0	0	3	0
Paddy Mills	Forward	11	3	0	0	11	3
Tot Pike	Forward	12	4	2	0	14	4
Harold Riley	Forward	1	0	0	0	1	0

== See also ==
- Birmingham City F.C. seasons
