= Jack Firth (footballer) =

English footballer (1907–1987)

Personal information
- Full name: Jack Firth
- Date of birth: 8 August 1907
- Place of birth: Brightside, Sheffield, England
- Date of death: 8 December 1987 (aged 80)
- Place of death: Doncaster, England
- Height: 5 ft 9 in (1.75 m)
- Positions: Wing half; inside forward

Youth career
- Woodlands Prims

Senior career*
Years	Team	Apps	(Gls)
19??–1926	Brodsworth Main Colliery		
	Doncaster Rovers	0	(0)
1926–1933	Birmingham	93	(7)
1933–1936	Swansea Town	102	(16)
1936–1937	Bury	7	(4)
1937–19??	Brodsworth Main Colliery		
- * Club domestic league appearances and goals

Jack Firth (8 August 1907 – 8 December 1987) was an English professional footballer who made more than 200 appearances in the Football League playing as a wing half or inside forward for Birmingham, Swansea Town and Bury.

== Life and career ==
Jack Firth was born on 8 August 1907 in Brightside, Sheffield; he was a son of Albert Firth, a coal miner, and his wife Harriet. The family spent time living in Barnsley before settling in Woodlands, where Firth attended the village school and captained its football team. He was a member of the Doncaster schools representative team that played in the English Schools Shield. On leaving school, he worked at Brodsworth Main Colliery, first as a screener and then in the office. He began his football career with Woodlands Prims, and then joined his works team, initially in the reserves. A trial with Doncaster Rovers during the 1925–26 season came to nothing, and in March 1926, he joined Football League First Division club Birmingham on a similar basis. The trial went well, he signed professional forms, "and was glad to forget the colliery and the coal-getting."

Firth made his first-team debut for Birmingham on 29 October 1927, replacing the indisposed Wally Harris as stand-in for Johnny Crosbie at inside right for the 3–1 defeat away to Sheffield United, the team Firth supported as a boy. The Sunday Mercury reporter wrote that he "revealed a great deal of footcraft, but he was too slow in parting with the ball and should have fed his partner oftener." Starting at inside left, he scored his first goal 12 minutes into the visit to Middlesbrough on 25 February 1928 following a corner, and finished the game at right half after Jimmy Cringan was injured; it was only after the reorganisation that Middlesbrough equalised. He ended the season with six appearances, and made twice that number in 1928–29, six at inside forward and six at right half, in the last of which he broke a collarbone.

He was a regular at right half the following season and for the first couple of months of the next, until dropped in favour of Cringan. Brought into the forward line to face Grimsby Town with Joe Bradford away on international duty with England and George Briggs and George Hicks injured, and despite carrying an injury for much of the second half, Firth scored a hat-trick in the last half-hour of the game to secure a 4–1 win. He regained a regular place in the side from mid-February onwards, scored in the FA Cup sixth round replay and played in the semi-final win against Sunderland, but Bob Gregg was preferred for the 1931 FA Cup Final, which Birmingham lost 2–1 to West Bromwich Albion. He remained at the club for another two years, during which he made just 14 appearances, and was not retained at the end of the 1932–33 season.

Firth signed for Swansea Town of the Second Division in August 1933. He was a regular in their team for three seasons, mainly as an inside forward, and in his first season scored ten goals from 34 league appearances, a return that made him Swansea's second top scorer with only one fewer than Syd Lowry's 11. He was made available for transfer in 1936, and signed for Bury, another Second Division club. His manager, Norman Bullock, thought he would "prove a very good utility player", but, apart from a run of five games at inside right in February 1937 that produced four goals, he rarely played.

He returned home at the end of that season, and rejoined Brodsworth Main, both colliery and football team. In addition to football, Firth played league cricket in Yorkshire.

Firth died in Doncaster on 8 December 1987 at the age of 80.

== Career statistics ==
Appearances and goals by club, season and competition
Club	Season	League			FA Cup		Total	
Club	Season	Division	Apps	Goals	Apps	Goals	Apps	Goals
Birmingham	1927–28	First Division	6	1	0	0	6	1
Birmingham	1928–29	First Division	12	2	0	0	12	1
Birmingham	1929–30	First Division	36	0	3	0	39	0
Birmingham	1930–31	First Division	25	4	2	1	27	5
Birmingham	1931–32	First Division	9	0	0	0	9	0
Birmingham	1932–33	First Division	5	0	0	0	5	0
Birmingham	Total		93	7	5	1	98	8
Swansea Town	1933–34	Second Division	34	10	4	0	38	10
Swansea Town	1934–35	Second Division	36	4	2	0	38	4
Swansea Town	1935–36	Second Division	32	2	1	0	33	2
Swansea Town	Total		102	16	7	0	109	16
Bury	1936–37	Second Division	7	4	0	0	7	4
Career total			202	27	12	1	214	28

== Sources ==
- Matthews, Tony (1995). Birmingham City: A Complete Record. Derby: Breedon Books. ISBN 978-1-85983-010-9.
