= Ernie Curtis =

Welsh footballer (1907–1992)

Personal information
- Full name: Ernest Robert Curtis
- Date of birth: 10 June 1907
- Place of birth: Cardiff, Wales
- Date of death: November 1992 (aged 85)
- Place of death: Cardiff, Wales
- Height: 5 ft 9 in (1.75 m)
- Position: Outside left

Youth career
- Cardiff Corinthians

Senior career*
Years	Team	Apps	(Gls)
1925–1928	Cardiff City	46	(8)
1928–1933	Birmingham	165	(44)
1933–1935	Cardiff City	16	(6)
1935–1937	Coventry City	21	(2)
1937–1938	Hartlepools United	16	(1)
Total		264	(61)

International career
1927–1933	Wales	3	(3)
- * Club domestic league appearances and goals

Ernest Robert Curtis (10 June 1907 – November 1992) was a Welsh professional footballer who played as an outside forward. Born in Cardiff, he joined hometown side Cardiff City in 1925, initially as an amateur before turning professional a year later. He made his senior debut in 1926 and helped the side win both the FA Cup and Welsh Cup in his first season. In the club's 1927 FA Cup victory, he became the youngest player to appear in a final in the competition's history as Cardiff defeated Arsenal, remaining the only team from outside England to win the trophy.

Curtis was sold to Birmingham in 1928 where he went on to make more than 160 appearances in all competitions during a five-year spell. He reached a second FA Cup final in 1931 but was on the losing side. He returned to Cardiff in 1933 but became involved in a wage dispute with the club and never featured for the side again. Eventually Coventry City secured his release in 1935 and he helped the side win promotion to the Second Division the following year. He finished his career with Hartlepools United where he spent one year before retiring. During his career he made over 250 appearances in the Football League and won 3 caps for the Wales national side.

During World War II, Curtis served in the 77th Division of the 2nd Welsh Brigade, Royal Field Artillery, but was captured in Java in 1941. He spent the rest of the war in a prisoner-of-war camp. He later worked as a trainer for Cardiff before becoming a publican.

== Club career ==
=== Cardiff City ===
A Welsh schoolboy international, Curtis was playing amateur football with Cardiff Corinthians, also working as an electrician, when he joined Cardiff City in 1925. On his signing, he was initially an amateur with the side and featured in the reserve team before being offered his first professional contract in 1926. He made his senior debut for Cardiff on 25 September 1926 in a 2–0 defeat to Manchester United, replacing Potter Smith in the starting lineup. In the following match, he scored his first goal for the club during a 6–3 defeat to Derby County. He featured more than 30 times in all competitions during his debut season, which was also limited by an ankle injury sustained in March 1927. As a result, he missed the club's FA Cup semi-final victory over Reading, as well as six league matches.

Curtis had previously played in all five matches en route to the club reaching the 1927 FA Cup Final but his injury meant he was unlikely to play in the final. However Harry Wake, who had replaced Curtis in the semi-final, suffered an injury in a league match two weeks before the final which ruled him out. Billy Thirlaway, who had covered Curtis' absence in the league, was also ruled out as he was cup-tied for the game having played in the earlier rounds of the competition for his former club. Curtis was therefore brought back into the starting lineup for the final, becoming the youngest ever player to have appeared in an FA Cup final at the age of 19 years and 317 days. Cardiff went on to beat Arsenal 1–0 in the final to become the only team from outside England to win the competition as of 2021. He also helped the club win the Welsh Cup in his first season, defeating Rhyl 2–0 in the final.

The following year, Curtis began the season in the first team and also played in Cardiff's 1927 FA Charity Shield victory over amateur side Corinthians on 12 October 1927. However, he gradually fell out of favour and made his final appearance for the club on 5 March 1928 in a 1–0 defeat to Tottenham Hotspur.

=== Birmingham ===
Curtis was sold to Birmingham in March 1928 for a £3,000 fee. His transfer was completed in time for him to make his debut for the club in a 4–1 victory over Sheffield United on 12 March, and the Athletic News reported that he "fitted into the side perfectly, and was responsible for some really clever touches". His first full season with the club, the 1928–29 campaign, was disrupted by injury problems; he was stretchered off with a knee issue during a match against Newcastle United on 17 November 1928 that required the attention of a specialist. In the opening months of 1929, Curtis was forced to undergo a knee operation that kept him out of the side for more than a month.

In September 1929, Birmingham had taken a 3–1 lead away to Blackburn Rovers when their goalkeeper, Harry Hibbs, fell over an opposing forward, injured his back, and with his movement severely impaired, conceded three goals in the last ten minutes of the first half. Hibbs was unable to continue, so Curtis kept goal in the second half; he also conceded three, and the match ended as a 7–5 defeat. With Birmingham near the bottom of the league table, Curtis withdrew from international selection in favour of playing for his club in the home match against Blackburn Rovers on 1 February 1930. They lost, and Curtis twisted his knee during the match which resulted in him missing the rest of the season.

For his first two years at Birmingham, Curtis had been used at inside-forward or on the right wing. A month into the 1930–31 season, he was switched to outside-left, and there he settled. He reached the second FA Cup final of his career in 1931 after helping his side defeat Sunderland 2–0 in the semi-final in March 1931. Curtis scored the opening goal of the game, after beating his man on the edge of the penalty area before shooting into the roof of the net, and combined with teammate Joe Bradford to force the ball over the line for his second goal later in the game. During their cup run, Bradford and Curtis scored all but one of Birmingham's 14 goals en route to the team's first ever appearance in the final; Bradford scored seven with Curtis scoring six, including another brace against Watford in the fifth round. However, he was denied a second winner's medal when his Birmingham side went on to lose 2–1 against Second Division side West Bromwich Albion in the final.

Curtis continued as a regular in the side. Over the next couple of seasons he missed around a dozen matches, considerably fewer than at the start of his Birmingham career, and he and Bradford were joint top scorers with 14 goals in the 1932–33 season. At the end of that season, manager Leslie Knighton left for Chelsea. His successor, George Liddell, brought in several new players and was willing to let go those he thought past their prime, one of whom was Curtis. He had contributed 45 goals from 165 appearances in the First Division, and 9 goals from 17 FA Cup ties.

=== Return to Cardiff and later clubs ===
Curtis rejoined Cardiff in November 1933 after five years with Birmingham with his hometown club now playing in the Third Division South. He made his first appearance on his return on 2 December in a 4–0 defeat to Brighton & Hove Albion. Cardiff were experiencing a poor run of form on his arrival and Curtis suffered defeats in his first four appearances, scoring his first goal since his return in a 3–1 defeat against Northampton Town in the third of these matches. Curtis featured in 19 consecutive matches in all competitions following his return, scoring 7 times, and took up the captaincy of the squad after Tom Maidment stepped down from the role. However, he became involved in a dispute with the club over wages and was placed on the transfer list in July 1934 after failing to agree terms. Curtis remained contracted to Cardiff until 1935 but did not feature in a senior fixture after March 1934 and even returned to Birmingham where he began running a pub.

He was sold to Coventry City on 8 February 1935, after the club secured his release from his contract, and he made his debut the following day against Bristol City. However, having not played a first team game for nearly a year, Curtis was described in the Coventry Evening Telegraph as "a complete failure". His form gradually improved as he returned to fitness and, in the 1935–36 season, he scored an equalising goal against Torquay United from the penalty spot in the final match of the campaign. Coventry went on to win the match and secure promotion to the Second Division. The club's promotion led to Curtis being primarily a reserve team player the following year, during which time he played numerous roles in defence, midfield and attack. At the end of the 1936–37 season, he was released by Coventry. He instead signed for Third Division North side Hartlepools United. The club struggled throughout the season and Curtis was utilised in several positions during the first half of the campaign. He retired in 1938 after one season at the County Durham side.

== International career ==
Curtis made his debut for Wales on 29 October 1927, scoring in a 2–2 draw with Scotland in the 1927–28 British Home Championship. However, following his move to Birmingham, Curtis rarely featured for the national side after the club frequently refused to release him for international duty. He also turned down at least one call-up himself to assist Birmingham when they were struggling against relegation. His second cap came four years after the first, in a 3–2 defeat against Scotland in which he scored both of his side's goals. He gave Wales the lead after converting a penalty kick he had won himself before adding a second later in the game. (Note: Some period newspaper reports attribute the second goal to Taffy O'Callaghan but contemporary sources credit Curtis with the goal.) His third and final appearance came on 4 November 1933 in a 1–1 draw with Ireland.

== Personal life ==
Curtis married Gwendoline McJennett, the sister of his Cardiff City teammate Jack McJennett, in August 1928 at St. Paul's Church in Cardiff. At the outbreak of the Second World War he joined the 77th Division of the 2nd Welsh Brigade, Royal Field Artillery along with four other footballers: Billy James, Jackie Pritchard, Billy Baker and Bobby Tobin. Their unit was posted to the Far East, where they were captured by Japanese forces in Java in 1941 and spent the duration of the war in a prisoner-of-war camp before being released in September 1945. During his time in the camp, Curtis taught Japanese officers how to play football with a ball made out of paper in order to obtain food. The effects of his imprisonment led Curtis to lose nearly half his body weight and his son later remarked how Curtis' wife barely recognised him on his return home. Curtis later attributed his survival to the fitness obtained from his football career.

After the war, Curtis rejoined Cardiff as a trainer and remained with the club until the 1960s in various roles. He later managed the Ninian Park and Landsowne Hotel pubs in Cardiff. He died in Cardiff in November 1992, aged 85. At the time of his death, he was the last surviving member of Cardiff City's 1927 FA Cup final winning team.

== Career statistics ==
=== Club ===
Appearances and goals by club, season and competition
Club	Season	League			FA Cup		Other (Note: Includes other competitive competitions, including the FA Charity Shield, Welsh Cup and the Football League Third Division South Cup.)		Total	
Club	Season	Division	Apps	Goals	Apps	Goals	Apps	Goals	Apps	Goals
Cardiff City	1926–27	First Division	26	5	6	1	4	1	36	7
Cardiff City	1927–28	First Division	20	3	0	0	1	0	21	3
Cardiff City	Total		46	8	6	1	5	1	57	10
Birmingham	1927–28	First Division	11	1	0	0	0	0	11	1
Birmingham	1928–29	First Division	10	1	0	0	0	0	10	1
Birmingham	1929–30	First Division	25	9	3	0	0	0	28	9
Birmingham	1930–31	First Division	40	8	7	6	0	0	47	14
Birmingham	1931–32	First Division	35	13	2	0	0	0	37	13
Birmingham	1932–33	First Division	36	11	5	3	0	0	41	14
Birmingham	1933–34	First Division	8	2	0	0	0	0	8	2
Birmingham	Total		165	45	17	9	0	0	182	54
Cardiff City	1933–34	Third Division South	16	6	0	0	3	1	19	7
Cardiff City	1934–35	Third Division South	0	0	0	0	0	0	0	0
Cardiff City	Total		16	6	0	0	3	1	19	7
Coventry City	1934–35	Third Division South	8	0	0	0	0	0	8	0
Coventry City	1935–36	Third Division South	11	1	1	0	1	0	13	1
Coventry City	1936–37	Second Division	2	1	0	0	0	0	2	1
Coventry City	Total		21	2	1	0	1	0	23	2
Hartlepools United	1937–38	Third Division North	16	1	0	0	0	0	16	1
Career total			264	62	24	10	9	2	297	74

=== International goals ===
Scores and results list Wales goal tally first, score column indicates score after each Curtis goal.

List of international goals scored by Ernie Curtis
No.	Date	Venue	Opponent	Result	Competition
1	29 October 1927	Racecourse Ground, Wrexham, Wales	Scotland	2–2	1927–28 British Home Championship
2	31 October 1931	Racecourse Ground, Wrexham, Wales	Scotland	2–3	1931–32 British Home Championship
3	31 October 1931	Racecourse Ground, Wrexham, Wales	Scotland	2–3	1931–32 British Home Championship

== Honours ==
Cardiff City

- FA Cup: 1926–27
- FA Charity Shield: 1927
- Welsh Cup: 1927

Birmingham

- FA Cup runner-up: 1930–31
