= George Haywood =

English footballer (1906–1992)

Personal information
- Full name: George Haywood
- Date of birth: 11 December 1906
- Place of birth: Gelsmoor, England
- Date of death: 25 January 1992 (aged 85)
- Place of death: Coalville, England
- Height: 5 ft 8 in (1.73 m)
- Position: Centre forward

Senior career*
Years	Team	Apps	(Gls)
1924–1927	Coleorton Bible Class		
1927–1928	Whitwick Imperial		
1927	Loughborough Corinthians	1	(0)
1928	Gresley Rovers	20	(11)
1928–1934	Birmingham	38	(15)
1934–1935	Chesterfield	16	(7)
1935	Cradley Heath		
1935–1936	Southport	6	(1)
1936–1937	Cradley Heath		
1937–1938	Stafford Rangers	1	(0)
- * Club domestic league appearances and goals

George Haywood (11 December 1906 – 25 January 1992) was an English professional footballer who played as a centre forward. He made 60 appearances and scored 23 goals in the Football League, playing for Birmingham, Chesterfield and Southport.

== Early life and career ==
George Haywood was born on 11 December 1906 in Gelsmoor, Leicestershire. He was the son of Joseph Haywood, a coal miner, and his wife Lizzie, and was raised in nearby Coleorton.

Haywood worked as a miner at Coleorton Colliery and New Lount Colliery, and played football for three seasons for his local club, Coleorton Bible Class of the Coalville Sunday Schools League. In April 1927, he was selected to represent that league against their Leicester counterparts, and he joined Whitwick Imperial of the Leicestershire Senior League ahead of the coming season. He had trials with several higher-level clubs, including Leicester City, Southend United, for whose reserves he scored twice against Watford in a London Combination match and played against Leicester City in the same competition; Chesterfield, and Loughborough Corinthians, for whom he played once in the Midland League but did not turn up for his second outing. Haywood remained with Whitwick until April 1928, when he signed for Birmingham Combination club Gresley Rovers. He scored twice on debut, in a 4–0 win against Tamworth Castle, and took his league totals to 11 goals from 20 matches by the end of November.

== Birmingham ==
After a trial in which he and Gresley team-mate Tommy Robinson played for Birmingham's Combination side, both signed professional forms for the Football League First Division club in January 1929. It was a year until he made his first-team debut: having been until then restricted to third-team football, he stood in for the injured Joe Bradford – England international and, as of 2022, the club's all-time top scorer – for the visit of league-leaders Manchester City on 7 December 1929. Despite the misgivings of some, he produced what the Evening Despatch's "Look round the world of sport" column dubbed "a display which would not have discredited players of far greater experience and bigger reputations", scored twice in a 3–0 win, and "proved to be a tenacious player, who never gave up until the ball was finally cleared, and, above all, a young man who had a very clear conception of the whereabouts of the goal." He played seven games before Bradford regained fitness and his place, and another five alongside him later in the season, and scored six goals, which included winners against Liverpool and Leeds United.

He was unable to maintain such form, and appeared only rarely before surgery to a knee injured in December was expected to put paid to his season. He did reappear, in mid-April 1931, but underwent a second operation in July and was unable to resume even third-team action until October. He was called into the League side as a late replacement for Sam Smith for the visit of Everton on 2 January 1932, and despite appearing nervous in the first half, at the start of the second he opened the scoring with two quick goals as Birmingham went on to beat the League leaders 4–0. He kept his place for seven games, scoring once more.

On his next appearance, in October 1932, he was "full of life", "a source of inspiration to the other forwards", and the victim of a linesman's "doubtful decision" that caused the referee to disallow a goal he had already awarded, as Birmingham came back from a goal down to beat Sheffield Wednesday. It later emerged that he had played the last 25 minutes with a broken arm. He returned to the team in December, and for the first time in his Birmingham career enjoyed frequent, if not regular, selection. He scored a hat-trick in a 4–0 defeat of Everton, and finished the season with five goals from 11 First Division matches and two from 5 in the FA Cup. Haywood played little in 1933–34, but still scored three goals from his six appearances, including a late winner in the FA Cup third round against Sheffield United, and he was not retained at the end of that season.

== Later life and career ==
He went on to Chesterfield of the Third Division North, but made a slow start and lost his place. When he returned to the side in December, he scored seven goals from his first five matches, and kept his place for a further month until Harry Clifton was switched to centre forward to accommodate Adam Dawson at inside right.

Haywood was not one of the 17 players retained by Chesterfield, and he signed for Birmingham League club Cradley Heath. By November he was second-highest scorer in the Birmingham League, and had 18 by mid-December. He then returned to the Football League with Southport, for whom he played in six Third Division North matches between 21 December 1935 and 18 January 1936, scoring once. He rejoined Cradley Heath ahead of the next season, and carried on where he left off, with three goals from the first two fixtures. He remained with Cradley Heath until the end of 1937, when he began a brief but eventful spell with Birmingham League club, Stafford Rangers. He scored the winning goal against local rivals Hednesford Town on Christmas Day to give his club their first home league win of the season, was injured in the second half of the following day's reverse fixture – neither goal nor appearances would count, as Hednesford withdrew from the league during the season – and his only official appearance for Stafford was on New Year's Day in a 6–1 defeat at home to Cardiff City's reserves.

The 1939 Register records Haywood living with his parents in Coleorton and working in New Lount Colliery time office.

Haywood was admitted to Coalville Community Hospital with inflammation of the knee, contracted bronchopneumonia, and died there on 25 January 1992 at the age of 85.

== Sources ==
- Joyce, Michael (2004). Football League Players' Records 1888 to 1939. Nottingham: SoccerData. ISBN 978-1-899468-67-6.
- Matthews, Tony (1995). Birmingham City: A Complete Record. Derby: Breedon Books. ISBN 978-1-85983-010-9.
