= Wilf Threlfall =

English footballer

Personal information
- Full name: Wilfred Threlfall
- Date of birth: 18 October 1906
- Place of birth: Morecambe, Lancashire, England
- Date of death: 13 February 1988 (aged 81)
- Place of death: Morecambe, Lancashire, England
- Height: 5 ft 9 in (1.75 m)
- Position: Outside left

Senior career*
Years	Team	Apps	(Gls)
- Morecambe
1926–1927	Sunderland	0	(0)
1927–1928	Birmingham	5	(0)
1928–1929	Bournemouth & Boscombe Athletic	3	(0)
1929–19??	Morecambe		
- Lancaster Town
- * Club domestic league appearances and goals

Wilfred Threlfall (15 October 1906 – 13 February 1988) was an English professional footballer who played in the Football League for Birmingham and Bournemouth & Boscombe Athletic.

Threlfall was born in Morecambe, Lancashire, the son of fishmonger Richard Threlfall and Alice Johnson Threlfall. The Threfall family originated from Lancashire and took their surname from a former manor known as Trelefelt or Threlfield. Wilf Threlfall had an uncle of the same name from Morecambe who joined the Rochdale Hornets F.C. as a full back in 1906.

He played for Morecambe F.C. before joining Sunderland, but moved on to fellow First Division club Birmingham in July 1927 without having played for Sunderland's first team, even though he had been highly impressive in training. The Derby Daily Telegraph reported in 1926:

It will be rather surprising if Sunderland overlook the claims of Billy Ellis and George Death for their outside left position, but the prospects are that a newcomer in Wilfred Threlfall will have done duty this afternoon. Wilf is a youngster who did extremely well with the Morecambe club last season, and was signed up by the Roker Park club as a soon as the old campaign ended. His form in trial matches has been startling.

Threlfall made his debut in a 1–0 defeat at Tottenham Hotspur on the opening day of the 1927–28 season, and he and Arthur Johnson shared the outside left position for the next couple of months. In November 1927, Birmingham signed Billy Ellis, the same winger who had kept Threlfall out of the Sunderland team, and both Threlfall and Johnson moved on at the end of the season without playing again. After only three appearances for Bournemouth & Boscombe Athletic in the Third Division South, Threlfall returned home to non-league football with Morecambe and later with Lancaster Town.

He married Margaret H. Cooper in January 1931.
