= Albert Bloxham =

English footballer

Personal information
- Date of birth: 26 November 1905
- Place of birth: Solihull, England
- Date of death: 29 August 1996 (aged 90)
- Place of death: Crawley, England
- Height: 5 ft 10 in (1.78 m)
- Position: Outside right

Senior career*
Years	Team	Apps	(Gls)
1925–192?	Overton-on-Dee		
192x–1926	Oswestry Town		
1926–1927	Torquay United		
1927–1928	Birmingham	3	(1)
1928	Rhyl Athletic		
1928	Chesterfield	7	(1)
1928–1929	Raith Rovers		
1929–1931	Yeovil & Petters United		
1931–1933	Millwall	70	(11)
- * Club domestic league appearances and goals

Albert Bloxham (26 November 1905 – 29 August 1996) was an English professional footballer who scored 13 goals in 80 appearances in the Football League playing for Birmingham, Chesterfield and Millwall. He played as an outside right.

Bloxham was born in Solihull, which was then part of Warwickshire. He began his football career with Overton-on-Dee while working as an office clerk, then played for Oswestry Town and for Torquay United in the 1926–27 season when they won the Southern League title. Bloxham himself moved on to First Division club Birmingham in March 1927. He made his Football League debut on 8 October 1927, deputising for Benny Bond in a home game against Sheffield Wednesday which Birmingham won 3–2. He scored in the next game, but Bond then returned to the starting eleven.

Unable to gain a regular first-team place, he moved on to Rhyl Athletic, then back INto the Football League for a few months with Chesterfield, and then to Scotland where he spent the 1928–29 season with Raith Rovers as they were relegated from the First Division of the Scottish League. Bloxham then returned to England for two seasons with Yeovil & Petters United in the Southern and Western Leagues before joining Millwall of the Football League Second Division. With Millwall he played regularly for two seasons, scoring 11 goals in 70 league matches, before retiring from the game in 1933.

Bloxham died in Crawley, West Sussex, in 1996 at the age of 90.
