= Arthur Johnson (footballer, born 1903) =

English footballer

Personal information
- Full name: Arthur Johnson
- Date of birth: 16 December 1903
- Place of birth: Atherstone, England
- Date of death: 7 June 1987 (aged 83)
- Place of death: Birmingham, England
- Height: 5 ft 10 1/2 in (1.79 m)
- Position: Outside left

Senior career*
| Years | Team | Apps | (Gls) |
- Atherstone Town
| 1924–1925 | Huddersfield Town | 0 | (0) |
| 1925–1927 | Barnsley | 21 | (4) |
| 1927–1928 | Birmingham | 9 | (0) |
| 1928–1931 | Bristol City | 60 | (7) |
| 1931–193? | Coventry City | 5 | (1) |
- * Club domestic league appearances and goals

Arthur Johnson (16 December 1903 – 7 June 1987) was an English professional footballer who made 95 appearances in the Football League playing for Barnsley, Birmingham, Bristol City and Coventry City.

Johnson was born in Atherstone, Warwickshire. He began his football career with home-town club Atherstone Town, and joined Football League champions Huddersfield Town in November 1924, but moved on to Barnsley a year later without appearing for the first team. After 20 games in 18 months for Barnsley, Johnson, an outside left, returned to the Midlands with Birmingham. He played a run of games in the early part of the 1927–28 season, but his performances on the field failed to live up to those on the training ground. He lost his place to Billy Ellis, and moved on to Bristol City at the end of the season. Johnson played 62 games in all competitions for Bristol City before returning nearer home once more to finish off his career at Coventry City.
