= Harry Lane (footballer, born 1909) =

English footballer (1909-1977)

Personal information
- Full name: Henry William Lane
- Date of birth: 21 March 1909
- Place of birth: Hednesford, England
- Date of death: 9 January 1977 (aged 67)
- Place of death: Cannock, England
- Height: 5 ft 6 in (1.68 m)
- Position: Forward

Senior career*
Years	Team	Apps	(Gls)
- Hednesford Town
- Rugeley Villa
–	Bloxwich Strollers		
1930–1933	Birmingham	2	(0)
1933–1938	Southend United	155	(50)
1938–1946	Plymouth Argyle (Note: Plymouth Argyle total includes three games and one goal from the abandoned 1939–40 Football League season.)	50	(9)
1946–1949	Southend United	65	(14)
1949–1950	Chelmsford City		
- * Club domestic league appearances and goals

Henry William Lane (21 March 1909 – 9 January 1977) was an English professional footballer who scored 74 goals in 271 appearances in the Football League playing for Birmingham, Southend United and Plymouth Argyle.

== Career ==
Lane was born in Hednesford, Staffordshire. A forward, he joined Birmingham from Staffordshire local football. He made his debut in the First Division on 29 November 1930, deputising for Johnny Crosbie at inside right in a game at Bolton Wanderers which Birmingham lost 2–0. Lane played once more that season, but could not establish himself as a first-team player. He was released in May 1933 and joined Southend United of the Third Division South.

Lane played 177 games in all competitions for Southend in nearly five seasons with the club, scoring 58 goals at a rate of one every three games. He was their leading scorer in the 1935–36 season with 17 goals, and followed up with another 17 the next season, including two hat-tricks. In March 1938, he moved up to the Second Division with Plymouth Argyle.

He was a regular in Plymouth's first-team until the Second World War put an end to competitive football, though without scoring as freely as he had for Southend. He remained with Plymouth for a couple of months playing in the wartime regional league, and later made guest appearances for Nottingham Forest, Northampton Town, West Bromwich Albion and Port Vale in wartime competition. In May 1946, Lane rejoined Southend. He contributed 21 goals in 75 games over the next three seasons, finally retiring from professional in May 1949 at 40. In 1949, Lane signed for Chelmsford City. On 24 August 1949, Lane became the oldest-ever debutant for the club in a 2–1 win against Barry Town.

Lane died in Cannock, Staffordshire, in 1977 aged about 68.

== Career statistics ==
Appearances and goals by club, season and competition
Club	Season	League			Cups		Total	
Club	Season	Division	Apps	Goals	Apps	Goals	Apps	Goals
Birmingham	1930–31	First Division	2	0	0	0	2	0
Southend United	1933–34	Third Division South	39	9	4	0	43	9
Southend United	1934–35	Third Division South	25	8	4	2	29	10
Southend United	1935–36	Third Division South	40	12	6	5	46	17
Southend United	1936–37	Third Division South	36	16	4	1	40	17
Southend United	1937–38	Third Division South	15	5	4	0	19	5
Southend United	Total		155	50	22	8	177	58
Plymouth Argyle	1937–38	Second Division	11	2	0	0	11	2
Plymouth Argyle	1938–39	Second Division	36	6	1	0	37	6
Plymouth Argyle	1939–40	Second Division	3	1	0	0	3	1
Plymouth Argyle	Total		50	9	1	0	51	9
Southend United	1946–47	Third Division South	38	13	3	3	41	16
Southend United	1947–48	Third Division South	23	1	0	0	23	1
Southend United	1948–49	Third Division South	4	0	0	0	4	0
Southend United	Total		65	14	3	3	68	17
Career total			272	73	26	11	298	84
