= Sid Wallington =

English footballer (1908–1989)

Personal information
- Full name: Sidney Percival Wallington
- Date of birth: 15 October 1908
- Place of birth: Birmingham, England
- Date of death: December 1989 (aged 81)
- Place of death: Birmingham, England
- Height: 5 ft 10 in (1.78 m)
- Position: Wing half

Senior career*
Years	Team	Apps	(Gls)
192?–1928	Wolseley Motors		
1928–1933	Birmingham	2	(0)
1933–1937	Bristol Rovers	94	(1)
1937–1939	Worcester City		
1939–19??	Cradley Heath St Luke's		

Managerial career
- 1937–1938: Worcester City
- * Club domestic league appearances and goals

Sidney Percival Wallington (15 October 1908 – December 1989) was an English professional footballer who made 96 appearances in the Football League playing for Birmingham and Bristol Rovers. He played as a wing half.

Wallington was born in the Small Heath district of Birmingham, and lived in St Andrew's Road, adjacent to Birmingham F.C.'s St Andrew's ground. A pupil of Ada Road School, Wallington played for the Birmingham Schools representative team that reached the final of the English Schools' Football Association Trophy in 1923. He signed for Birmingham from Wolseley Motors in 1928, and played for their junior teams in a variety of positions before making his debut in the First Division on 30 April 1932, the penultimate game of the 1931–32 season, in a 4–0 home win against Chelsea. Though his performance received a favourable report – the Birmingham Mail described his excellent ball control and felt that "one saw enough of him to justify the conclusion that he understands the defensive duties of a wing half-back equally well" – Birmingham's next game was Wallington's last for the club.

The following year he joined Bristol Rovers, where he played 94 league games in four seasons and helped them win the Football League Third Division South Cup in 1935. He went on to Worcester City, where he also acted as manager during the 1937–38 season, and finished his career at Cradley Heath St Luke's.

Wallington died in his native Birmingham in December 1989 at the age of 81.

== Honours ==
Birmingham Schools

- ESFA Trophy runners-up: 1923

Bristol Rovers

- Third Division South Cup winners: 1935
