= Alfred Sabin =

English footballer (1905–1982)

Personal information
- Full name: Alfred James Sabin
- Date of birth: 7 April 1905
- Place of birth: Oldbury, England
- Date of death: 1982 (aged 76–77)
- Height: 5 ft 10 1/2 in (1.79 m)
- Position: Right half

Senior career*
Years	Team	Apps	(Gls)
- Accles & Pollock
1930	Birmingham	2	(0)
1930–1932	Oldbury United		
1932–19??	Leamington Town		
- * Club domestic league appearances and goals

Alfred James Sabin (7 April 1905 – 1982) was an English footballer who played in the First Division of the Football League for Birmingham.

Sabin was born in Oldbury, which was then part of Worcestershire. Described as an attacking wing half, he had been playing for Accles & Pollock's works team when given a run-out in Birmingham's last two games of the 1929–30 season, making his debut in a 1–1 draw away to Sheffield Wednesday on 28 April 1930. He was not kept on, and returned to non-league football with Oldbury United and Leamington Town.
