= Sam Smith (footballer, born 1909) =

English footballer (1909–1994)

Personal information
- Full name: Samuel James Smith
- Date of birth: 7 September 1909
- Place of birth: Pelsall, England
- Date of death: November 1994 (aged 85)
- Place of death: England
- Height: 5 ft 11 3/4 in (1.82 m)
- Position: Centre forward

Senior career*
| Years | Team | Apps | (Gls) |
- Walsall LMS
| 1930–1934 | Birmingham | 31 | (13) |
| 1934–1935 | Chelsea | 0 | (0) |
| 1935–1936 | Norwich City | 1 | (0) |
| 1936 | Walsall | 14 | (4) |
| 1936–19?? | Stourbridge | | |
- * Club domestic league appearances and goals

Samuel James Smith (7 September 1909 – November 1994) was an English footballer who played as a centre forward. He scored 17 goals in 46 appearances in the Football League playing for Birmingham, Norwich City and Walsall.

Smith was born in Pelsall, which was then in Staffordshire. He played for Walsall LMS before joining Birmingham in 1930. He scored twice on his debut against local rivals Aston Villa, and finished the 1931–32 season with ten goals from 15 league games, but the following season Bob Gregg regained his place alongside Joe Bradford in attack. Under George Liddell, who took over from Leslie Knighton as manager, Smith played rarely, and in 1934 he followed Knighton to Chelsea. He failed to make the first team at Chelsea, and a year later moved on to Norwich City, but six months produced only one league appearance, so he returned to the Midlands with Walsall in January 1936. At the end of that season he moved into non-league football with Stourbridge.
