= Gelsmoor =

Hamlet in Leicestershire, England

Coordinates: 52°45′41″N 1°23′58″W

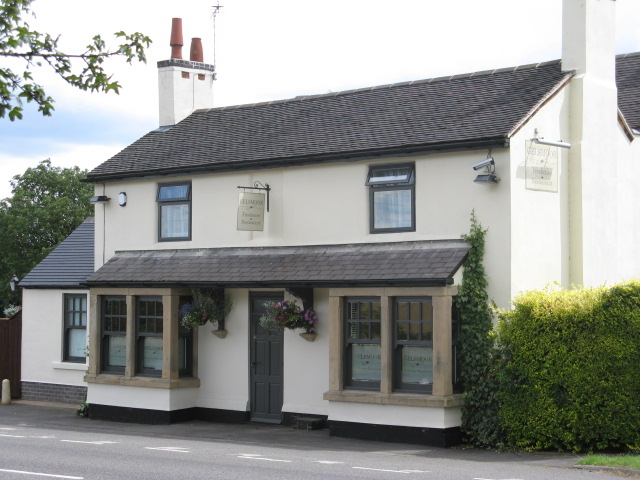
Gelsmoor Inn

Gelsmoor is a hamlet within the parish of Worthington in the English county of Leicestershire.

It is noted for having a 'petrifying spring' in a nineteenth-century gazetteer, and also a Wesleyan Methodist Chapel.
