= Tommy Robinson (footballer) =

English footballer (1909–1982)

Personal information
- Full name: Thomas Edward Robinson
- Date of birth: 11 February 1909
- Place of birth: Coalville, England
- Date of death: 25 March 1982 (aged 73)
- Place of death: Moira, Leicestershire, England
- Height: 5 ft 9 in (1.75 m)
- Position: Inside left

Senior career*
Years	Team	Apps	(Gls)
- Coalville YMCA
- Ibstock Town
- Whitwick Imperial
192?–1928	Loughborough Corinthians		
1928	Gresley Rovers		
1928–1933	Birmingham	10	(1)
1933	Blackpool	2	(0)
1933–1934	Chesterfield	22	(7)
1934–1935	Lincoln City	33	(14)
1935–1936	Northampton Town	4	(2)
1936–1937	Gillingham	35	(12)
1937–1938	Walsall	15	(1)
1938–1939	Tunbridge Wells Rangers		
- Nuneaton Borough
- * Club domestic league appearances and goals

Thomas Edward Robinson (11 February 1909 – 25 March 1982) was an English professional footballer who scored 37 goals in 121 appearances in the Football League playing mainly as an inside left for Birmingham, Blackpool, Chesterfield, Lincoln City, Northampton Town, Gillingham and Walsall.

== Life and career ==
Thomas Edward Robinson was born on 11 February 1909 in Coalville, Leicestershire. He was the second son of Ernest Robinson, a coal miner, and his wife Gertrude Martha. He played local football for Coalville YMCA, Ibstock Town and Leicestershire Senior League club Whitwick Imperial before joining Loughborough Corinthians of the Midland League ahead of the 1927–28 season. He moved on to Gresley Rovers of the Birmingham Combination in March 1928, scored four goals on debut in a 10–0 win, and, after a trial in which he and Gresley team-mate George Haywood played for Birmingham's Combination side, both signed professional forms for the Football League First Division club in January 1929.

Robinson played for Birmingham, Blackpool, Chesterfield, Lincoln City, Northampton Town, Gillingham and Walsall, appearing in all four divisions of the Football League during the 1930s. He then returned to non-league football with Tunbridge Wells Rangers and Nuneaton Borough. He retired from the game during the Second World War.

Robinson died in Moira, Leicestershire, on 25 March 1982 at the age of 73.
