= Jack Morfitt =

English footballer

Personal information
- Full name: John William Morfitt
- Date of birth: 28 September 1908
- Place of birth: Sheffield, England
- Date of death: 1973 (aged 64–65)
- Height: 5 ft 10 in (1.78 m)
- Position: Centre forward

Senior career*
Years	Team	Apps	(Gls)
- Heeley
- Anston Athletic
1929–1930	Mansfield Town		
1928–1931	Birmingham	1	(0)
1931–1932	Blackpool	1	(0)
1932	Bradford	9	(5)
1932–1936	Southend United	66	(16)
- * Club domestic league appearances and goals

John William Morfitt (28 September 1908 – 1973) was an English professional footballer who scored 21 goals in 77 appearances in the Football League playing for Birmingham, Blackpool, Bradford and Southend United. He played as a centre forward.

Morfitt was born in Sheffield, Yorkshire. He played local football in the Sheffield area and for Mansfield Town in the Midland League before he joined First Division club Birmingham in March 1928. His game was based on pace rather than strength, and he played only once for Birmingham's first team, on 21 March 1931 in a 2–1 home defeat to Middlesbrough. Later that year he joined fellow First Division club Blackpool, where again he played only once (in a 1–1 draw, against the club he had just left, at Bloomfield Road on 12 September), and in March 1932 he dropped down a division to sign for Bradford. Five goals in nine games for Bradford preceded another move, this time to Southend United of the Third Division South. Here Morfitt finally got regular first-team football. In four years he scored 23 goals in 81 appearances in all competitions before injury forced his retirement from the game in 1936.

Morfitt died in 1973, aged 64 or 65.
