= New Lount =

Nature reserve in Leicestershire, England

Coordinates: 52.759°N 1.416°W

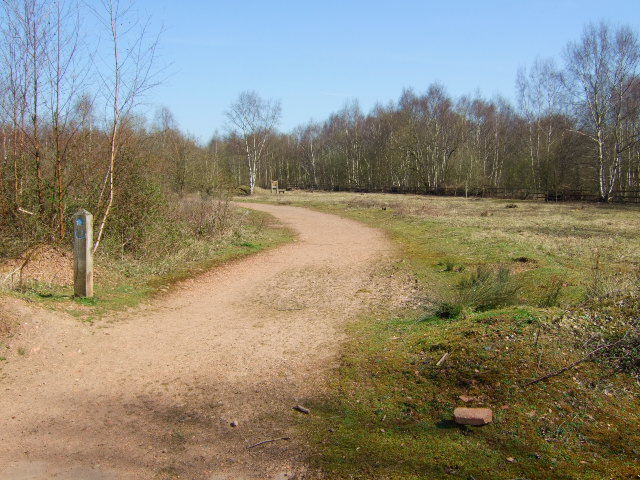
- Interactive map of New Lount
- Type: Local Nature Reserve
- Location: Ashby-de-la-Zouch, Leicestershire
- OS grid: SK 395 181
- Area: 21.3 hectares (53 acres)
- Manager: Leicestershire County Council

New Lount is a 21.3 hectares (53 acres) Local Nature Reserve north-east of Ashby-de-la-Zouch in Leicestershire. It is owned and managed by Leicestershire County Council.

This site has a diverse bird population, such as green woodpeckers, chiffchaffs, blackcaps, willow warblers and goldcrests. Soprano and common pipistrelles catch insects over the site's four ponds.

There is access from Melbourne Road.
