= Whitwick Imperial F.C. =

Defunct football club from Leicestershire

Whitwick Imperial
- Full name: Whitwick Imperial Football Club
- Nicknames: the Imps, the Colliers
- Founded: 1909
- Dissolved: 1929
- Ground: Duke of Newcastle Field
Home colours

Whitwick Imperial F.C. was an association football club from Whitwick, Leicestershire, active before the Second World War.

== History ==
The club was formed after Whitwick White Cross resigned from the Midland League, and joined the Coalville and District League in 1908. After one season it joined the Leicestershire Senior League. The club's first success came in the Coalville and District Charity Cup in 1911–12.

The Imps won the Senior League for the first time in 1914–15, albeit the First World War saw the competition reduced to six clubs; however its second title, five years later, was in a ten-team competition. It was a regular entrant to the FA Cup (eschewing the FA Amateur Cup) from 1912–13 to 1928–29, three times reaching the second qualifying round.

The club's most successful league seasons came in the early 1920s; from 1921–22 to 1924–25 the club won three Leicestershire titles and was runner-up once. It was also twice runner-up in the Leicestershire and Rutland Senior Cup, both times to Loughborough Corinthians - losing the final 3–1 and 1–0 in 1921–22 and 1922–23 respectively.

However the club's finances were poor throughout - its deficit rising from £25 to £41 in 1923–24 - and in 1925–26 the Imps, who had remained staunchly amateur, plummeted to finishing the league season just one above last place, and both League and Imps declined in importance. By 1929, when the club was wound up due to lack of support, the championship was down to 6 clubs. The Imps' final match was a 5–1 defeat to Peggs Green Victoria in the final of the Coalville Charity Cup on 2 April 1929, the trophy being presented by Birmingham player Joe Bradford to his brother Tom, captain of the victorious side.

== Colours ==
The club wore black and white, by 1924 in the form of black shirts with a white V.

== Ground ==
The club played at the Duke of Newcastle Ground, behind the hotel of the same name. It was later used for crown green bowling.

== Notable players ==
- Notable players ( 8 )
