= Tot Pike =

English footballer (1907–1967)

Personal information
- Full name: Theophilus Enos Pike
- Date of birth: 25 March 1907
- Place of birth: Sunderland, England
- Date of death: 26 October 1967 (aged 60)
- Place of death: Bury St Edmunds, England
- Height: 5 ft 10 1/4 in (1.78 m)
- Position: Forward

Senior career*
Years	Team	Apps	(Gls)
- Sunderland Co-op Wednesday
1925–1927	Fulham	3	(0)
1927–1928	Bournemouth & Boscombe Athletic	16	(3)
1928–1930	Birmingham	15	(4)
1930–1933	Southend United	69	(19)
1933–1935	Norwich City	20	(7)
1935–1937	Bury Town		
- * Club domestic league appearances and goals

Theophilus Enos Pike (25 March 1907 – 26 October 1967), known as Tot Pike, was an English professional footballer who scored 33 goals in 123 appearances in the Football League playing for Fulham, Bournemouth & Boscombe Athletic, Birmingham, Southend United and Norwich City. He played as a left-sided forward.

Pike was born in Sunderland. He began his football career with Sunderland Co-op Wednesday and had an unsuccessful trial with Southend United before joining Fulham of the Football League Second Division in 1925. He played only three games for the club before moving on to Bournemouth & Boscombe Athletic and then to Birmingham. Pike was prone to injury, and missed the whole of the 1929–30 season before leaving Birmingham for Southend. In three seasons Pike played 72 games in all competitions and scored 20 goals. His last club in the Football League was Norwich City, after which he had two years as player-coach of Bury Town in the Eastern Counties League. He later coached for the local Football Associations in East Anglia, and after the Second World War became a publican; in the 1950s he was licensee of the Star at Thetford.

Pike died in Bury St Edmunds, Suffolk, in 1967 at the age of 60.
