= Jack Coxford =

English footballer

Personal information
- Full name: John Coxford
- Date of birth: 25 July 1901
- Place of birth: North Seaton, Ashington, England
- Date of death: 1978 (aged 76–77)
- Place of death: Bury St Edmunds, England
- Height: 5 ft 10 in (1.78 m)
- Position: Centre half

Senior career*
Years	Team	Apps	(Gls)
- North Seaton Colliery
- Stakeford United
1924–1927	Sunderland	11	(0)
1927–1930	Birmingham	16	(0)
1930–1934	Bournemouth & Boscombe Athletic	134	(3)
1934	Poole Town	2	(0)
1934–193?	Northfleet United		
- * Club domestic league appearances and goals

John Coxford (25 July 1901 – 1978) was an English professional footballer who played in the Football League for Sunderland, Birmingham and Bournemouth & Boscombe Athletic. He played as a centre half.

== Life and career ==
Coxford was born in North Seaton, Ashington, Northumberland. He played for North Seaton Colliery and Stakeford United before joining Sunderland in 1924. He made his debut in the First Division on 18 April 1925, in a 1–1 draw at Blackburn Rovers, but never established himself as a first-team player. In April 1927, after only 11 games for Sunderland, Coxford joined fellow First Division club Birmingham. He was signed as cover for George Morrall, but the developing Tom Fillingham pushed Coxford down the pecking order, and after three years with the club in which he played only 16 games, he left for Bournemouth & Boscombe Athletic of the Third Division South. At Bournemouth, Coxford had four seasons of regular first-team football. Towards the end of the 1933–34 season, he played two games for nearby Poole Town before moving on to Northfleet United as player-coach.

Northfleet United acted as a nursery club for Tottenham Hotspur. Wales and Tottenham player Ron Burgess described in his autobiography how

We were a young side at Northfleet, for the average age of the lads, with the exception of our skipper and centre-half, Jack Coxford, could not have been more than 19 years. Jack was the 'old head' amongst that bunch of sprightly youth, and what he didn't know about the game wasn't worth knowing! He did his best to impart some of his knowledge and experience to us by his grand example and influence.

Coxford went on to join the training staff at Tottenham, working under Cecil Poynton, with particular responsibility for the reserve team.

Coxford died in Bury St Edmunds, Suffolk, in 1978 aged about 77.
