= Ken Tewkesbury =

English footballer (1909–1970)

Personal information
- Full name: Kenneth Cyril Tewkesbury
- Date of birth: 10 April 1909
- Place of birth: Hove, England
- Date of death: 20 November 1970 (aged 61)
- Place of death: Birmingham, England
- Height: 6 ft 3 in (1.91 m)
- Position: Goalkeeper

Senior career*
Years	Team	Apps	(Gls)
1928–1932	Birmingham University		
1929–1931	Birmingham	5	(0)
1931	Casuals		
1931–1932	Aston Villa	0	(0)
1932–1933	Notts County	7	(0)
1933–1935	Aston Villa	1	(0)
1935–1936	Bradford Park Avenue	14	(0)
1936–1939	Walsall	75	(0)

International career
1930–1932	England (amateur)	6	(0)

Managerial career
- Falmouth Town
- * Club domestic league appearances and goals

Kenneth Cyril Tewkesbury (10 April 1909 – 20 November 1970) was an English professional footballer who made 102 appearances in the Football League playing as a goalkeeper for Birmingham, Notts County, Aston Villa, Bradford Park Avenue and Walsall. Before turning professional he won six caps for the England national amateur football team.

== Club football ==
While a student at the University of Birmingham, Tewkesbury played for the university football club, and joined Football League club Birmingham as an amateur in October 1929. Deputising for Harry Hibbs who was absent on England international duty, he made his debut in the First Division on 2 April 1930, in an away game against Newcastle United which finished as a 1–1 draw. He played four more first-team games over the next couple of years; his performance in a 4–2 defeat by Arsenal in September 1930 was described by The Times as "brilliant and entertainingly unorthodox".

Tewkesbury's League performances and caps for the England amateur team led to approaches from 'touring clubs' Corinthian and Bedouins, but he decided to play for Casuals in two Isthmian League games against Clapton and Wimbledon in December 1931. He joined Aston Villa at the end of that month, but moved on to Notts County a few months later without having appeared for Villa's first team. After seven Second Division games for Notts County, Tewkesbury returned to Aston Villa in January 1933, signing professional forms for the first time in his career. He played only one first-team game for Villa, and spent the 1935–36 season with Bradford Park Avenue, for whom he appeared in 14 Second Division games. He finished his Football League career with three seasons at Walsall, playing 75 Third Division South matches before retiring from the game in August 1939.

== Representative football ==
Tewkesbury played for the Combined Universities from 1929, captaining the team in 1930, and frequently appeared for Amateur F.A. XIs in matches against the Oxford and Cambridge University clubs. In 1931 he turned out for leading amateur club Casuals.

Tewkesbury made his international debut for the England amateur team on 15 November 1930 in Belfast against the Irish amateurs. Ireland won 3–1, but The Times' correspondent absolved him from blame for the goals. In the summer of 1931, he went on the Football Association's tour of Canada. Tewkesbury's sixth and last appearance for England, in March 1932, was also a 3–1 defeat, this time against Scotland's amateurs, and despite his saving a penalty.

== Personal life ==
Tewkesbury was born in Hove, Sussex, in 1909. He studied for a BSc degree at the University of Birmingham. He married the daughter of Birmingham F.C. director W. H. Bull, and went on to work for many years in Birmingham's Jewellery Quarter.

In 1941, Ken was helping out with the youth centre Redditch Games Week providing mass-instruction on the playing field.

Tewkesbury moved to Cornwall and took up residence at Roscarrack House, Budock, near Falmouth, where he took up his hobby in horticulture. He then volunteered his services to the newly formed Falmouth Town and was a pivotal figure in the club's early days and he was the team manager for the club's first three seasons in senior football. His granddaughter Sarah Newton was elected as the local M.P. for the Truro and Falmouth constituency at the 2010 General Election.

He returned to Birmingham and died in the city in 1970 at the age of 61.
