= Billy Ellis =

English footballer

Personal information
- Full name: William Thomas Ellis
- Date of birth: 5 November 1895
- Place of birth: Wolverhampton, England
- Date of death: 18 November 1939 (aged 44)
- Place of death: Sunderland, England
- Height: 5 ft 9 in (1.75 m)
- Position: Outside left

Senior career*
| Years | Team | Apps | (Gls) |
- Highfield Villa
- Willenhall Swifts
| – | Bilston | | |
| – | Willenhall | | |
| 1919–1927 | Sunderland | 192 | (32) |
| 1927–1929 | Birmingham | 32 | (8) |
| 1929–1930 | Lincoln City | 31 | (11) |
| 1930–1931 | York City | 3 | (1) |
- * Club domestic league appearances and goals

William Thomas Ellis (5 November 1895 – 18 November 1939) was an English footballer born in Wolverhampton who played in the Football League for Sunderland, Birmingham, Lincoln City and York City as a winger.

He made his debut for Sunderland against Middlesbrough on 6 March 1920 in a 2–0 win at Ayresome Park. During his time at Sunderland, from 1920 to 1927, he made 192 league appearances and scored 32 goals. He linked up well with Charlie Buchan for whom he created many goals from the left wing. He went on to play for Birmingham, Lincoln City and York City, and died in Sunderland in 1939 at the age of 44.
