= Bob Gregg (footballer, born 1904) =

English footballer (1904–1991)

Personal information
- Full name: Robert Edmond Gregg
- Date of birth: 4 February 1904
- Place of birth: Ferryhill, England
- Date of death: 22 May 1991 (aged 87)
- Place of death: London, England
- Height: 5 ft 9 in (1.75 m)
- Position: Inside forward

Youth career
- Ferryhill Athletic
- Cornford Juniors
- Spennymoor United
- Chilton Colliery Recreation Athletic

Senior career*
Years	Team	Apps	(Gls)
1926–1928	Darlington	40	(21)
1928–1931	Sheffield Wednesday	37	(7)
1931–1933	Birmingham	66	(11)
1933–1938	Chelsea	48	(5)
1938–1940	Boston United		
1940–1944	Sligo Rovers		
1945	Colchester United	2	(0)
- * Club domestic league appearances and goals

Robert Edmond Gregg (4 February 1904 – 22 May 1991) was an English professional footballer who played as an inside forward. He played for Darlington, Sheffield Wednesday, Birmingham and Chelsea in the Football League, making nearly 200 appearances in total.

Having scored at a goal every two games for Darlington, Gregg joined Sheffield Wednesday before the 1928–29 season, and contributed to them winning that year's First Division championship. The following season, he lost his place to the high-scoring Harry Burgess, and in January 1931 he joined Birmingham for a fee of £2,200. He played his part in that season's FA Cup campaign, and "scored" a goal in the 1931 FA Cup Final which was disallowed for offside. He moved on to Chelsea in September 1933 for a fee of £1,500, finishing his career with Boston United in the Midland League and with Sligo Rovers in Ireland during the Second World War.

Gregg also made 1 WW2 Guest appearance for Clapton Orient on 26 August 1944, played at Fratton Park against Portsmouth, a 5–1 defeat, before a 10 000 crowd. a report on the match in a local Portsmouth paper stated that Gregg had a shot on six minutes which was saved by the Pompey goalkeeper Harry Walker. In November 1945 he was stationed at the Colchester Garrison and he made 3 appearances for then Southern League side Colchester United, his debut came at the age of 41 years and 272 days in the FA Cup against Wisbech Town.

== Honours ==
Sheffield Wednesday

- Football League First Division: 1928–29

Birmingham

- FA Cup runner-up: 1930–31
