= George Hicks (footballer) =

English footballer

Personal information
- Full name: George Wolstenholme Hicks
- Date of birth: 30 April 1902
- Place of birth: Salford, England
- Date of death: 21 February 1954 (aged 51)
- Place of death: Worsley, England
- Height: 5 ft 8 in (1.73 m)
- Position: Outside left

Youth career
- Salford Lads Club

Senior career*
Years	Team	Apps	(Gls)
- Clayton
19??–1923	Droylsden		
1923–1928	Manchester City	123	(40)
1928–1932	Birmingham	76	(18)
1932	Manchester United	0	(0)
1932–1933	Bristol Rovers	0	(0)
1933	Swindon Town	4	(0)
1933–1934	Rotherham United	28	(6)
1934–19??	Manchester North End		
- Lancaster Town
- CWS Vere Street Works
- Droylsden
- * Club domestic league appearances and goals

George Wolstenholme Hicks (30 April 1902 – 21 February 1954) was an English professional footballer who played as an outside left. He made 231 appearances in the Football League playing for Manchester City, Birmingham, Swindon Town and Rotherham United.

== Life and career ==
Hicks was born in Salford in 1902. He played youth football with Salford Lads' Club before joining Manchester-based Clayton and then Droylsden, from where he signed for Manchester City in November 1923. (Note: Some older sources list him as a Manchester Central player before signing for Manchester City, but that club was not formed until 1928, and their match programme from the 1928–29 season describes his move from Droylsden to Manchester City as part of a local football news feature, not as that of a former player.) He played for City in the 1926 FA Cup Final and contributed to them winning the Second Division championship in the 1927–28 season. He signed for First Division club Birmingham in October 1928, and scored 12 league goals in what remained of that season. Early in the 1930–31 season he sustained a serious knee injury. Though he attempted a comeback twelve months later, playing and scoring against Blackpool in September 1931, that game marked the end of his Birmingham career. He moved to Manchester United in January 1932, but left for Bristol Rovers later that year without having featured for the first team. A further year later, again without playing League football, he joined Swindon Town, for whom he played four matches before moving to his last Football League club, Rotherham United, where he missed only three games in the remainder of the 1933–34 season. He went on play non-league football for Manchester North End, Lancaster Town, CWS Vere Street Works, and a further spell with Droylsden.

Hicks died in Worsley, Lancashire, on 21 February 1954 at the age of 51.

== Honours ==
Manchester City

- FA Cup runner-up: 1925–26
