= Benny Bond =

English footballer

Personal information
- Full name: Benjamin Bond
- Date of birth: 30 August 1904
- Place of birth: Wolverhampton, England
- Date of death: March 1972 (aged 67)
- Place of death: Wolverhampton, England
- Height: 5 ft 5 3/4 in (1.67 m)
- Position: Outside right

Senior career*
Years	Team	Apps	(Gls)
–	Coseley		
–	Pensnett		
–	Upper Gornal		
–	Wellington Town		
1924–1926	Bilston United		
1926	Coseley		
1926–1932	Birmingham	82	(13)
- * Club domestic league appearances and goals

Benjamin Bond (30 August 1904 – March 1972) was an English professional footballer who played as an outside right for Birmingham, for whom he made 82 appearances in the First Division of the Football League. His career was ended prematurely by a knee injury which required several operations. Before joining Birmingham, he played non-league football for Coseley, Pensnett, Upper Gornal, Wellington Town and Bilston United.
