= Jack Randle =

English footballer

Personal information
- Date of birth: 23 August 1902
- Place of birth: Bedworth, England
- Date of death: 1990 (aged 87–88)
- Place of death: Bournemouth, England
- Height: 5 ft 7 in (1.70 m)
- Position: Left back

Youth career
- Exhall Colliery
- Bedworth BC

Senior career*
Years	Team	Apps	(Gls)
1922–1927	Coventry City	149	(0)
1927–1933	Birmingham	111	(0)
1933	Southend United	0	(0)
1933–1934	Bournemouth & Boscombe Athletic	28	(0)
1934–19??	Guildford City		
- * Club domestic league appearances and goals

Jack Randle (23 August 1902 – May 1990) was an English professional footballer who played as a left back. Born in Bedworth, Warwickshire, Randle worked as a coal miner before joining Coventry City, for whom he played nearly 150 league matches. He went on to play more than 100 Football League First Division matches for Birmingham in a six-year career, during the second half of which he was mainly used as cover for George Liddell. He later played for Southend United, Bournemouth & Boscombe Athletic and Guildford City. He died in Bournemouth in 1990 aged about 87.
