= Alec Leslie =

Scottish footballer

Personal information
- Full name: Alfred James Leslie
- Date of birth: 11 July 1900
- Place of birth: Greenock, Renfrewshire, Scotland
- Date of death: 1 February 1961 (aged 60)
- Place of death: Birmingham, England
- Height: 5 ft 7 1/2 in (1.71 m)
- Position: Left half

Youth career
- Greenock Wayfarers

Senior career*
Years	Team	Apps	(Gls)
- Port Glasgow Athletic Juniors
1919–1921	St Mirren	48	(1)
1921–1923	Houghton-le-Spring		
1923–1925	Morton	20	(2)
1925–1927	Torquay United		
1927–1932	Birmingham	132	(0)
- * Club domestic league appearances and goals

Alfred James Leslie (11 July 1900 – 1 February 1961), known as Alec Leslie, was a Scottish professional footballer who played as a left half.

Born in Greenock, Leslie was an influential defensive midfielder who played in Scotland with St Mirren and Morton, and appeared in 143 games for Birmingham, including 132 top flight League games and an appearance at Wembley in the 1931 FA Cup Final. A niggling knee injury disrupted his career; he played his last game for Birmingham in September 1931 before finally retiring in 1932. After football, he ran a pub and worked for the Inland Revenue. He died in Birmingham, aged 60.

== Honours ==
Birmingham

- FA Cup runner-up: 1930–31
