= Leslie Knighton =

English football manager

Personal information
- Full name: Albert Leslie Knighton
- Date of birth: 15 March 1887
- Place of birth: Church Gresley, Derbyshire, England
- Date of death: 10 May 1959 (aged 72)
- Place of death: Bournemouth, England

Managerial career
- Years: Team
- 1912: Huddersfield Town (caretaker)
- 1919–1925: Arsenal
- 1925–1928: Bournemouth & Boscombe Athletic
- 1928–1933: Birmingham
- 1933–1939: Chelsea
- 1945–1948: Shrewsbury Town

Albert Leslie Knighton (15 March 1887 – 10 May 1959) was an English football manager. He managed Arsenal, Bournemouth & Boscombe Athletic, Birmingham, Chelsea and Shrewsbury Town.

== Management career ==
Knighton was born in Church Gresley, Swadlincote, Derbyshire. His own playing career was cut short by injury, after which he moved into coaching and management. He first had spells as an assistant manager at Manchester City (1909–12) and Huddersfield Town (1912–19) – and was briefly caretaker manager of the latter in 1912. In 1919 Knighton was appointed secretary-manager of Arsenal, shortly after the club had been promoted to the First Division.

He oversaw the club for six years, but Arsenal never finished higher than mid-table, their best finish during his tenure being ninth in 1920-21. Neither did Arsenal do well in the FA Cup under Knighton - in only one season, 1921-22, did Arsenal get beyond the second round of the competition, eventually losing to Preston North End in a quarter-final replay.

During his time at Arsenal, Knighton had numerous fallings-out with Arsenal chairman Sir Henry Norris; Norris put a strict cap of £1,000 on transfer fees and refused to sign any player under 5'8" tall or eleven stone. When Knighton signed the 5' tall Hugh "Midget" Moffatt from Workington in 1923, Norris was furious when he found out; he overruled his manager and promptly sold the player to Luton Town before he'd played a League game. To get round Norris's rules, Knighton used his guile to sign some unusual transfers, such as the amateurs Reg Boreham and Jimmy Paterson - the latter was the Arsenal club doctor's brother-in-law, and went on to play nearly 80 games for Arsenal.

Despite Norris's interfering, Knighton, thanks to an informal scouting system of his friends and former colleagues in the North, signed several high-quality players for Arsenal; these included Bob John, Jimmy Brain and Alf Baker, all of whom would be part of Arsenal's trophy-winning side of the early 1930s. However, he could never knit together a solid winning side and Arsenal's performances gradually declined towards the end of his tenure; they finished 19th in 1923-24 and 20th in 1924-25.

During his final season at Arsenal, Knighton was involved in one of the first recorded cases of doping; before a January 1925 FA Cup first round tie against West Ham United, Knighton gave the players what he described as "little silver pills", given to him by a Harley Street doctor who was a fan of the club; although the pills were successful in increasing the players' energy, the side-effects caused them to have raging thirst. Arsenal drew the match 0-0 and before the replay they rebelled and refused to take them; Arsenal eventually lost 1-0 in the second replay after the first finished 2-2. Knighton's activities, entirely legal under the rules at the time, were not made public until he recounted the episode in his memoirs.

Norris dismissed Knighton in the summer of 1925 and replaced him with Herbert Chapman. Knighton later alleged that Norris has only sacked him to avoid paying him a bonus (estimated at up to £4,000) from a benefit match that he was due. Norris denied this and instead cited Arsenal's poor record that season (having finished 20th and knocked out of the FA Cup first round), but later regretted his dismissal, stating it was the one mistake in his career and in his will left Knighton £100.

After leaving the Gunners, Knighton went on to manage Bournemouth & Boscombe Athletic (1925–28), Birmingham (1928–33), whom he led to the 1931 FA Cup Final, Chelsea (1933–39) taking over from the long serving David Calderhead, and Shrewsbury Town (1945–48), before their election to the Football League. Knighton retired to Bournemouth after suffering ill health and took on the less pressurised job of a golf club secretary, during which he found time to write an autobiography, Behind the Scenes in Big Football (1948). He died in 1959, aged 72.
